= List of former United States representatives (O) =

This is a complete list of former United States representatives whose last names begin with the letter O.

== Number of years and terms the member has served ==
The number of years the representative/delegate has served in Congress indicates the number of terms the representative/delegate has. Note the representative/delegate can also serve non-consecutive terms if the representative/delegate loses election and wins re-election to the House.

- 2 years - 1 or 2 terms
- 4 years - 2 or 3 terms
- 6 years - 3 or 4 terms
- 8 years - 4 or 5 terms
- 10 years - 5 or 6 terms
- 12 years - 6 or 7 terms
- 14 years - 7 or 8 terms
- 16 years - 8 or 9 terms
- 18 years - 9 or 10 terms
- 20 years - 10 or 11 terms
- 22 years - 11 or 12 terms
- 24 years - 12 or 13 terms
- 26 years - 13 or 14 terms
- 28 years - 14 or 15 terms
- 30 years - 15 or 16 terms
- 32 years - 16 or 17 terms
- 34 years - 17 or 18 terms
- 36 years - 18 or 19 terms
- 38 years - 19 or 20 terms
- 40 years - 20 or 21 terms
- 42 years - 21 or 22 terms
- 44 years - 22 or 23 terms
- 46 years - 23 or 24 terms
- 48 years - 24 or 25 terms
- 50 years - 25 or 26 terms
- 52 years - 26 or 27 terms
- 54 years - 27 or 28 terms
- 56 years - 28 or 29 terms
- 58 years - 29 or 30 terms

Name	Term	State/ Territory	Party	Lifespan
Mary Rose Oakar	1977–1993	Ohio	Democratic	1940–2025
P. Davis Oakey	1915–1917	Connecticut	Republican	1861–1920
Thomas Jackson Oakley	1813–1815	New York	Federalist	1783–1857
Thomas Jackson Oakley	1827–1828	New York	Democratic	1783–1857
Charles G. Oakman	1953–1955	Michigan	Republican	1903–1973
William C. Oates	1881–1894	Alabama	Democratic	1835–1910
Jim Oberstar	1975–2011	Minnesota	Democratic-Farmer-Labor	1934–2014
Dave Obey	1969–2011	Wisconsin	Democratic	1938–present
Charles F.X. O'Brien	1921–1925	New Jersey	Democratic	1879–1940
George D. O'Brien	1937–1939; 1941–1947; 1949–1955	Michigan	Democratic	1900–1957
George M. O'Brien	1973–1986	Illinois	Republican	1917–1986
James O'Brien	1879–1881	New York	Independent Democrat	1841–1907
James H. O'Brien	1913–1915	New York	Democratic	1860–1924
Jeremiah O'Brien	1823–1825	Maine	Democratic-Republican	1778–1858
Jeremiah O'Brien	1825–1829	Maine	National Republican	1778–1858
Joseph J. O'Brien	1939–1945	New York	Republican	1897–1953
Leo W. O'Brien	1952–1966	New York	Democratic	1900–1982
Thomas J. O'Brien	1933–1939; 1943–1964	Illinois	Democratic	1878–1964
William J. O'Brien	1873–1877	Maryland	Democratic	1836–1905
William S. O'Brien	1927–1929	West Virginia	Democratic	1862–1948
Pablo Ocampo	1907–1909	Philippines	None	1853-1925
Thomas P. Ochiltree	1883–1885	Texas	Independent	1837–1902
David J. O'Connell	1919–1921; 1923–1930	New York	Democratic	1868–1930
Jeremiah E. O'Connell	1923–1927; 1929–1930	Rhode Island	Democratic	1883–1964
Jerry J. O'Connell	1937–1939	Montana	Democratic	1909–1956
John Matthew O'Connell	1933–1939	Rhode Island	Democratic	1872–1941
Joseph F. O'Connell	1907–1911	Massachusetts	Democratic	1872–1942
Charles O'Connor	1929–1931	Oklahoma	Republican	1878–1940
James O'Connor	1919–1931	Louisiana	Democratic	1870–1941
James F. O'Connor	1937–1945	Montana	Democratic	1878–1945
John J. O'Connor	1923–1939	New York	Democratic	1885–1960
Michael P. O'Connor	1879–1881	South Carolina	Democratic	1831–1881
Caroline O'Day	1935–1943	New York	Democratic	1875–1943
Benjamin Barker Odell Jr.	1895–1899	New York	Republican	1854–1926
Moses F. Odell	1861–1865	New York	Democratic	1818–1866
N. Holmes Odell	1875–1877	New York	Democratic	1828–1904
James O'Donnell	1885–1893	Michigan	Republican	1840–1915
Charles T. O'Ferrall	1884–1893	Virginia	Democratic	1840–1905
Charles F. Ogden	1919–1923	Kentucky	Republican	1873–1933
David A. Ogden	1817–1819	New York	Federalist	1770–1829
Henry W. Ogden	1894–1899	Louisiana	Democratic	1842–1905
Alexander Ogle	1817–1819	Pennsylvania	Democratic-Republican	1766–1832
Andrew Jackson Ogle	1849–1851	Pennsylvania	Whig	1822–1852
Charles Ogle	1837–1841	Pennsylvania	Anti-Masonic	1798–1841
Charles Ogle	1841	Pennsylvania	Whig	1798–1841
Woodson R. Oglesby	1913–1917	New York	Democratic	1867–1955
James M. E. O'Grady	1899–1901	New York	Republican	1863–1928
Frank T. O'Hair	1913–1915	Illinois	Democratic	1870–1932
Tom O'Halleran	2017–2023	Arizona	Democratic	1946–present
Barratt O'Hara	1949–1951; 1953–1969	Illinois	Democratic	1882–1969
James E. O'Hara	1883–1887	North Carolina	Republican	1844–1905
James G. O'Hara	1959–1977	Michigan	Democratic	1925–1989
Joseph P. O'Hara	1941–1959	Minnesota	Republican	1895–1975
Lewis P. Ohliger	1892–1893	Ohio	Democratic	1843–1923
Alvin O'Konski	1943–1973	Wisconsin	Republican	1904–1987
J. Van Vechten Olcott	1905–1911	New York	Republican	1856–1940
Pearl Peden Oldfield	1929–1931	Arkansas	Democratic	1876–1962
William Allan Oldfield	1909–1928	Arkansas	Democratic	1874–1928
Edson B. Olds	1849–1855	Ohio	Democratic	1802–1869
Denis O'Leary	1913–1914	New York	Democratic	1863–1943
James A. O'Leary	1935–1944	New York	Democratic	1889–1944
Abram B. Olin	1857–1863	New York	Republican	1808–1879
Gideon Olin	1803–1807	Vermont	Democratic-Republican	1743–1823
Henry Olin	1824–1825	Vermont	National Republican	1768–1837
Jim Olin	1983–1993	Virginia	Democratic	1920–2006
Andrew Oliver	1853–1857	New York	Democratic	1815–1889
Daniel C. Oliver	1917–1919	New York	Democratic	1865–1924
Frank A. Oliver	1923–1934	New York	Democratic	1883–1968
James C. Oliver	1937–1943	Maine	Republican	1895–1986
James C. Oliver	1959–1961	Maine	Democratic	1895–1986
Mordecai Oliver	1853–1855	Missouri	Whig	1819–1898
Mordecai Oliver	1855–1857	Missouri	Oppositionist	1819–1898
S. Addison Oliver	1875–1879	Iowa	Republican	1833–1912
William Bacon Oliver	1915–1937	Alabama	Democratic	1867–1948
William M. Oliver	1841–1843	New York	Democratic	1792–1863
Marlin Edgar Olmsted	1897–1913	Pennsylvania	Republican	1847–1913
Richard Olney II	1915–1921	Massachusetts	Democratic	1871–1939
Kathryn O'Loughlin McCarthy	1933–1935	Kansas	Democratic	1894-1952
Archibald E. Olpp	1921–1923	New Jersey	Republican	1882–1949
Arnold Olsen	1961–1971	Montana	Democratic	1916–1990
Alec G. Olson	1963–1967	Minnesota	Democratic-Farmer-Labor	1930–present
Pete Olson	2009–2021	Texas	Republican	1962–present
John Olver	1991–2013	Massachusetts	Democratic	1936–2023
Matthew Vincent O'Malley	1931	New York	Democratic	1878–1931
Thomas O'Malley	1933–1939	Wisconsin	Democratic	1903–1979
Emmet O'Neal	1935–1947	Kentucky	Democratic	1887–1967
Maston E. O'Neal Jr.	1965–1971	Georgia	Democratic	1907–1990
John H. O'Neall	1887–1891	Indiana	Democratic	1838–1907
Joseph H. O'Neil	1889–1895	Massachusetts	Democratic	1853–1935
Charles O'Neill	1863–1871; 1873–1893	Pennsylvania	Republican	1821–1893
Edward L. O'Neill	1937–1939	New Jersey	Democratic	1903–1948
Harry P. O'Neill	1949–1953	Pennsylvania	Democratic	1889–1953
John O'Neill	1863–1865	Ohio	Democratic	1822–1905
John Joseph O'Neill	1883–1889; 1891–1893; 1894–1895	Missouri	Democratic	1846–1898
Tip O'Neill	1953–1987	Massachusetts	Democratic	1912–1994
Daniel O'Reilly	1879–1881	New York	Independent Democrat	1838–1911
Stephen Ormsby	1811–1813; 1813–1817	Kentucky	Democratic-Republican	1759–1844
Beto O'Rourke	2013–2019	Texas	Democratic	1972–present
Alexander D. Orr	1792–1795	Kentucky	Anti-Administration	1761–1835
Alexander D. Orr	1795–1797	Kentucky	Democratic-Republican	1761–1835
Benjamin Orr	1817–1819	Massachusetts	Federalist	1772–1828
Jackson Orr	1871–1875	Iowa	Republican	1832–1926
James Lawrence Orr	1849–1859	South Carolina	Democratic	1822–1873
Robert Orr Jr.	1825–1829	Pennsylvania	Democratic	1786–1876
Godlove Stein Orth	1863–1871; 1873–1875; 1879–1882	Indiana	Republican	1817–1882
Solomon Ortiz	1983–2011	Texas	Democratic	1937–present
Bill Orton	1991–1997	Utah	Democratic	1948–2009
Edwin Sylvanus Osborne	1885–1891	Pennsylvania	Republican	1839–1900
Henry Z. Osborne	1917–1923	California	Republican	1848–1923
John Eugene Osborne	1897–1899	Wyoming	Democratic	1858–1943
Thomas Burr Osborne	1839–1843	Connecticut	Whig	1798–1869
Tom Osborne	2001–2007	Nebraska	Republican	1937–present
Doug Ose	1999–2005	California	Republican	1955–present
Gayton P. Osgood	1833–1835	Massachusetts	Democratic	1797–1861
George F. O'Shaunessy	1911–1919	Rhode Island	Democratic	1868–1934
Camilo Osías	1929–1935	Philippines	None	1889–1976
James H. Osmer	1879–1881	Pennsylvania	Republican	1832–1912
Frank C. Osmers Jr.	1939–1943; 1951–1965	New Jersey	Republican	1907–1977
Harold C. Ostertag	1951–1965	New York	Republican	1896–1985
Eugene D. O'Sullivan	1949–1951	Nebraska	Democratic	1883–1968
Patrick B. O'Sullivan	1923–1925	Connecticut	Democratic	1887–1978
Mariano S. Otero	1879–1881	New Mexico	Republican	1844-1904
Miguel Antonio Otero	1856–1861	New Mexico	Democratic	1829-1882
Peter J. Otey	1895–1902	Virginia	Democratic	1840–1902
Harrison Gray Otis	1797–1801	Massachusetts	Federalist	1765–1848
John Otis	1849–1851	Maine	Whig	1801–1856
John G. Otis	1891–1893	Kansas	Populist	1838–1916
Norton P. Otis	1903–1905	New York	Republican	1840–1905
Theobald Otjen	1895–1907	Wisconsin	Republican	1851–1924
Donald L. O'Toole	1937–1953	New York	Democratic	1902–1964
Butch Otter	2001–2007	Idaho	Republican	1942–present
Richard Ottinger	1965–1971; 1975–1985	New York	Democratic	1929–2026
Granville H. Oury	1881–1885	Arizona	Democratic	1825-1891
Joseph H. Outhwaite	1885–1895	Ohio	Democratic	1841–1907
George E. Outland	1943–1947	California	Democratic	1906–1981
David Outlaw	1847–1853	North Carolina	Whig	1806–1868
George Outlaw	1825	North Carolina	Democratic-Republican	1771–1825
Arthur W. Overmyer	1915–1919	Ohio	Democratic	1879–1952
James Overstreet	1819–1822	South Carolina	Democratic-Republican	1773–1822
James W. Overstreet	1906–1907; 1917–1923	Georgia	Democratic	1866–1938
Jesse Overstreet	1895–1909	Indiana	Republican	1859–1910
Edward Overton Jr.	1877–1881	Pennsylvania	Republican	1836–1903
John H. Overton	1931–1933	Louisiana	Democratic	1875–1948
Walter Hampden Overton	1829–1831	Louisiana	Democratic	1788–1845
Allen Ferdinand Owen	1849–1851	Georgia	Whig	1816–1865
Emmett Marshall Owen	1933–1939	Georgia	Democratic	1877–1939
George Washington Owen	1823–1825	Alabama	Democratic-Republican	1796–1837
George Washington Owen	1825–1829	Alabama	Democratic	1796–1837
James Owen	1817–1819	North Carolina	Democratic-Republican	1784–1865
Robert Dale Owen	1843–1847	Indiana	Democratic	1801–1877
Ruth Bryan Owen	1929–1933	Florida	Democratic	1885–1954
William D. Owen	1885–1891	Indiana	Republican	1846–19??
Bill Owens	2009–2015	New York	Democratic	1949–present
George Welshman Owens	1835–1839	Georgia	Democratic	1786–1856
James W. Owens	1889–1893	Ohio	Democratic	1837–1900
Major Owens	1983–2007	New York	Democratic	1936–2013
Thomas L. Owens	1947–1948	Illinois	Republican	1897–1948
Wayne Owens	1973–1975; 1987–1993	Utah	Democratic	1937–2002
William Claiborne Owens	1895–1896	Kentucky	Democratic	1849–1925
William Claiborne Owens	1896–1897	Kentucky	Republican	1849–1925
Bryan Owsley	1841–1843	Kentucky	Whig	1798–1849
Mike Oxley	1981–2007	Ohio	Republican	1944–2016
