= 27th United States Congress =

1841-1843 U.S. Congress

←	26th	28th	→
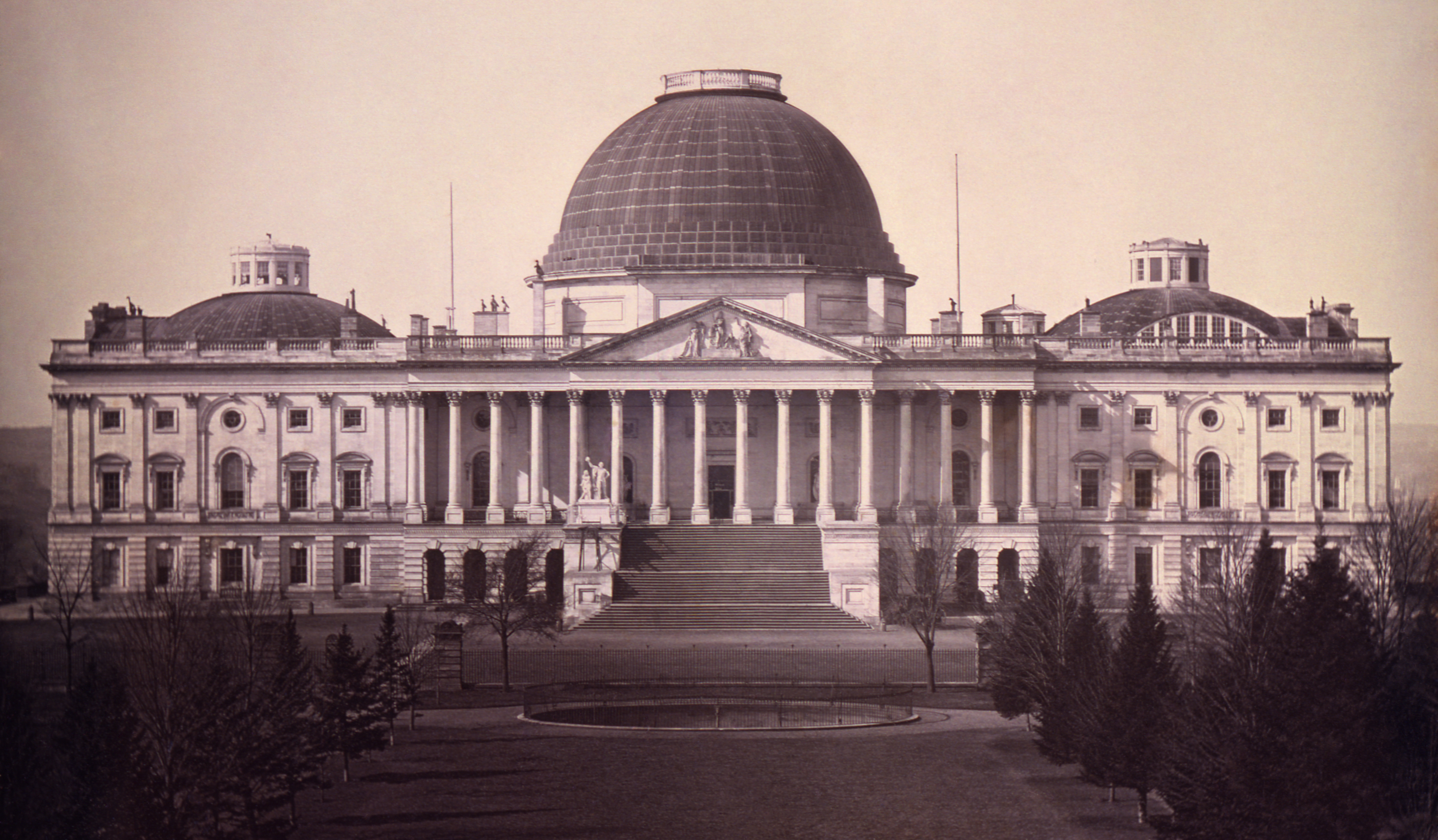
- United States Capitol (1846)

Overview
- Legislative body: United States Congress
- Jurisdiction: United States
- Term: March 4, 1841 – March 4, 1843

Senate
- Members: 52
- President: John Tyler (W) (Note: U.S. Vice President Tyler's term as President of the Senate ended on April 4, 1841, when he ascended to the presidency. President pro tempore Samuel L. Southard acted his duties as the president of the Senate until he retired on May 31, 1842, due to health reasons, and Willie P. Mangum took over to act his duties until at the end of Congress.) (until April 4, 1841); Vacant (from April 4, 1841)
- President pro tempore: William R. King (D); Samuel L. Southard (W); Willie P. Mangum (W)
- Party control: Whig

House of Representatives
- Members: 242 representatives 3 non-voting delegates
- Speaker: John White (W)
- Party control: Whig

Sessions
- Special (Note: Special session of the Senate.): March 4, 1841 – March 15, 1841
- 1st: May 31, 1841 – September 13, 1841
- 2nd: December 6, 1841 – August 31, 1842
- 3rd: December 5, 1842 – March 3, 1843 (lame duck)

The 27th United States Congress was a meeting of the legislative branch of the United States federal government, consisting of the United States Senate and the United States House of Representatives. It met in Washington, D.C., between March 4, 1841, and March 4, 1843, during the one-month presidency of William Henry Harrison and the first two years of the presidency of his successor, John Tyler. The apportionment of seats in the House of Representatives was based on the 1830 United States census. Both chambers had a Whig majority, making the 27th Congress the only Whig-controlled Congress of the Second Party System.

== Major events ==
- March 4, 1841: William Henry Harrison was inaugurated as President of the United States
- April 4, 1841: President Harrison died and Vice President John Tyler became President
- August 16, 1841: President Tyler's veto of a bill to re-establish the Second Bank of the United States led Whig Party members to riot outside the White House in the most violent demonstration on White House grounds in U.S. history.
- May 19, 1842: Dorr Rebellion
- December 17, 1842: Samuel W. Trotti of South Carolina, became the first Italian American to serve in Congress.

== Major legislation ==
- April 19, 1841: Bankruptcy Act of 1841, ch. 9, 5 Stat. 440
- September 4, 1841: Preemption Act of 1841, ch. 16, 5 Stat. 453
- August 4, 1842: Armed Occupation Act, 5 Stat. 502
- August 30, 1842: Tariff of 1842 ("Black Tariff"), ch. 270, 5 Stat. 548

== Treaties ==
- August 9, 1842: Webster-Ashburton Treaty signed, establishing the United States–Canada border east of the Rocky Mountains.

== Party summary ==
=== Senate ===
	Party (shading shows control)		Total	Vacant
	Democratic (D)	Whig (W)	Total	Vacant
End of previous congress	29	23	52	0
Begin	22	29	51	1
End	20	29	49	3
Final voting share	40.8%	59.2%		
Beginning of next congress	22	26	48	4

=== House of Representatives ===
	Party (shading shows control)				Total	Vacant
	Democratic (D)	Independent Democratic (ID)	Whig (W)	Other	Total	Vacant
End of previous congress	124	0	111	2 (Note: Conservative)	237	0
Begin	98	1	142	0	241	1
End	101	1	139	0	241	1
Final voting share	41.9%	0.4%	57.7%	0.0%		
Beginning of next congress	147	1	72	3 (Note: Law and Order & Independent Whig)	223	0

== Leadership ==
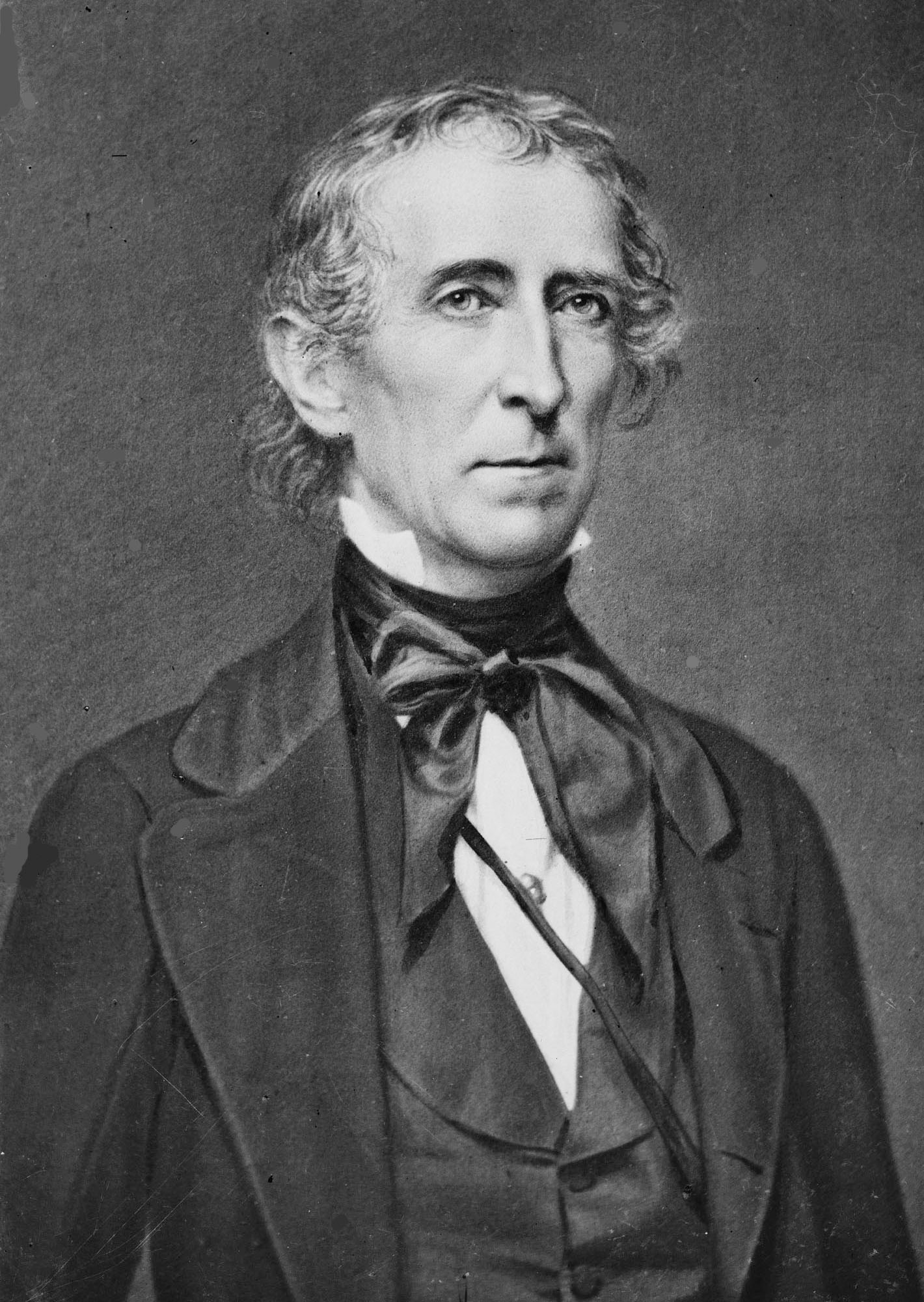
President of the Senate John Tyler

=== Senate ===
- President: John Tyler (W), until April 4, 1841, thereafter vacant
- Presidents pro tempore: William R. King (D), elected March 4, 1841
  - Samuel L. Southard (W), elected March 11, 1841
  - Willie P. Mangum (W), elected May 31, 1842

=== House of Representatives ===
- Speaker: John D. White (W)

== Members ==
This list is arranged by chamber, then by state. Senators are listed in order of seniority, and representatives are listed by district.

Skip to House of Representatives, below

=== Senate ===
Senators were elected by the state legislatures every two years, with one-third beginning new six-year terms with each Congress. Preceding the names in the list below are Senate class numbers, which indicate the cycle of their election. In this Congress, Class 1 meant their term began in the last Congress, requiring re-election in 1844; Class 2 meant their term began with this Congress, requiring re-election in 1846; and Class 3 meant their term ended with this Congress, requiring re-election in 1842.

==== Alabama ====
▌2. William R. King (D)
▌3. Clement C. Clay (D), until November 15, 1841

▌Arthur P. Bagby (D), from November 24, 1841

==== Arkansas ====
▌2. William Fulton (D)
▌3. Ambrose Sevier (D)

==== Connecticut ====
▌1. Jabez W. Huntington (W)
▌3. Perry Smith (D)

==== Delaware ====
▌1. Richard H. Bayard (W)
▌2. Thomas Clayton (W)

==== Georgia ====
▌2. John Macpherson Berrien (W)
▌3. Alfred Cuthbert (D)

==== Illinois ====
▌2. Samuel McRoberts (D)
▌3. Richard M. Young (D)

==== Indiana ====
▌1. Albert S. White (W)
▌3. Oliver H. Smith (W)

==== Kentucky ====
▌2. James T. Morehead (W)
▌3. Henry Clay (W), until March 31, 1842

▌John J. Crittenden (W), from March 31, 1842

==== Louisiana ====
▌2. Alexander Barrow (W)
▌3. Alexander Mouton (D), until March 1, 1842

▌Charles M. Conrad (W), from April 14, 1842

==== Maine ====
▌1. Reuel Williams (D), until February 15, 1843
▌2. George Evans (W)

==== Maryland ====
▌1. William D. Merrick (W)
▌3. John L. Kerr (W)

==== Massachusetts ====
▌1. Rufus Choate (W)
▌2. Isaac C. Bates (W)

==== Michigan ====
▌1. Augustus S. Porter (W)
▌2. William Woodbridge (W)

==== Mississippi ====
▌1. John Henderson (W)
▌2. Robert J. Walker (D)

==== Missouri ====
▌1. Thomas H. Benton (D)
▌3. Lewis F. Linn (D)

==== New Hampshire ====
▌2. Levi Woodbury (D)
▌3. Franklin Pierce (D), until February 28, 1842

▌Leonard Wilcox (D), from March 1, 1842

==== New Jersey ====
▌1. Samuel L. Southard (W), until June 26, 1842

▌William L. Dayton (W), from July 2, 1842

▌2. Jacob W. Miller (W)

==== New York ====
▌1. Nathaniel P. Tallmadge (W)
▌3. Silas Wright Jr. (D)

==== North Carolina ====
▌2. Willie P. Mangum (W)
▌3. William A. Graham (W)

==== Ohio ====
▌1. Benjamin Tappan (D)
▌3. William Allen (D)

==== Pennsylvania ====
▌1. Daniel Sturgeon (D)
▌3. James Buchanan (D)

==== Rhode Island ====
▌1. Nathan Dixon (W), until January 29, 1842

▌William Sprague III (W), from February 18, 1842

▌2. James F. Simmons (W)

==== South Carolina ====
▌2. John C. Calhoun (D)
▌3. William C. Preston (W), until November 29, 1842

▌George McDuffie (D), from December 23, 1842

==== Tennessee ====
▌1. Alfred O. P. Nicholson (D), until February 7, 1842
2. vacant

==== Vermont ====
▌1. Samuel S. Phelps (W)
▌3. Samuel Prentiss (W), until April 11, 1842

▌Samuel C. Crafts (W), from April 23, 1842

==== Virginia ====
▌1. William C. Rives (W)
▌2. William S. Archer (W)

Senators' party membership by state at the opening of the 27th Congress in March 1841. One of Tennessee's seats was never filled. 2 Democrats 1 Democrat and 1 Whig 2 Whigs

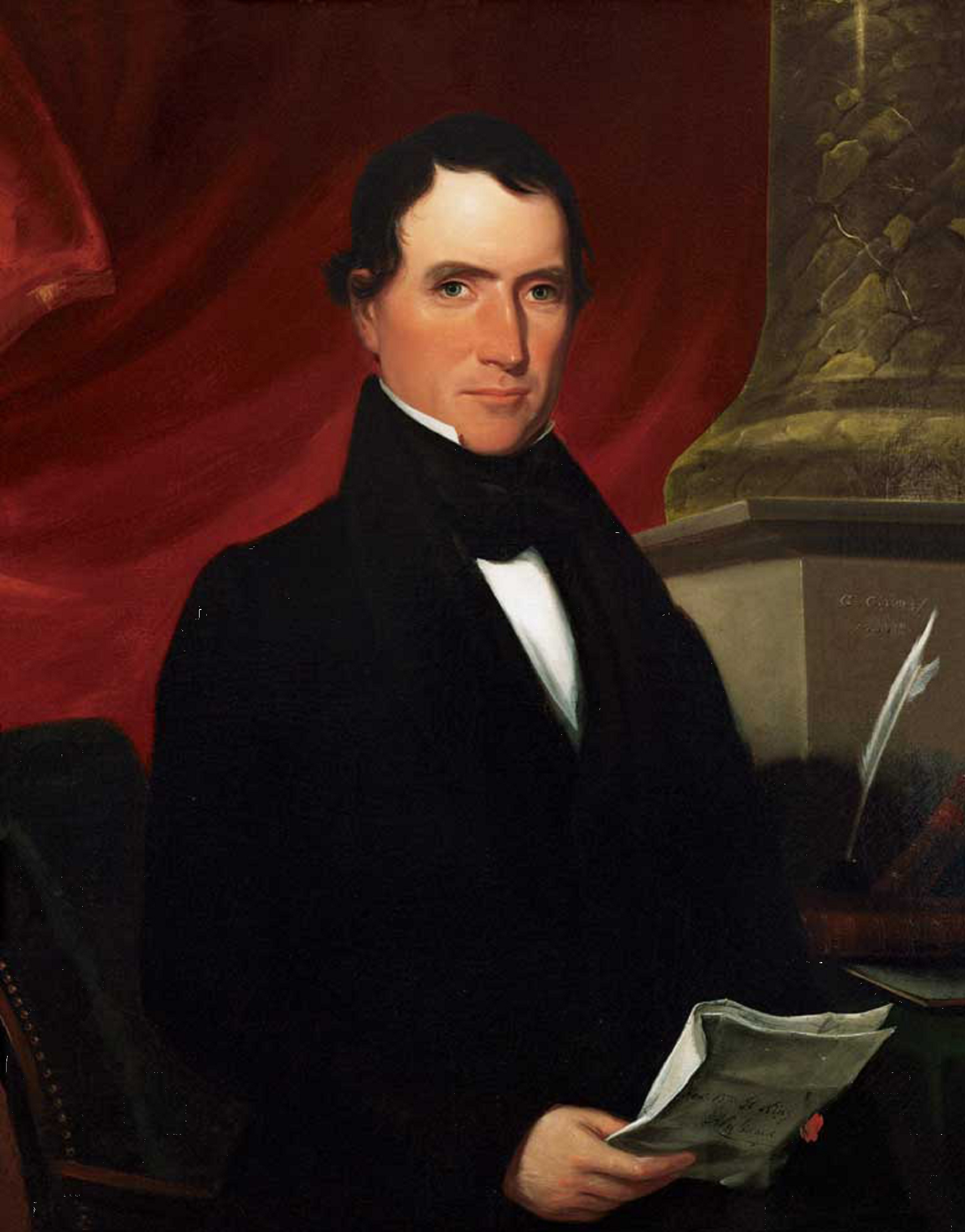
President pro tempore, 1841 William R. King

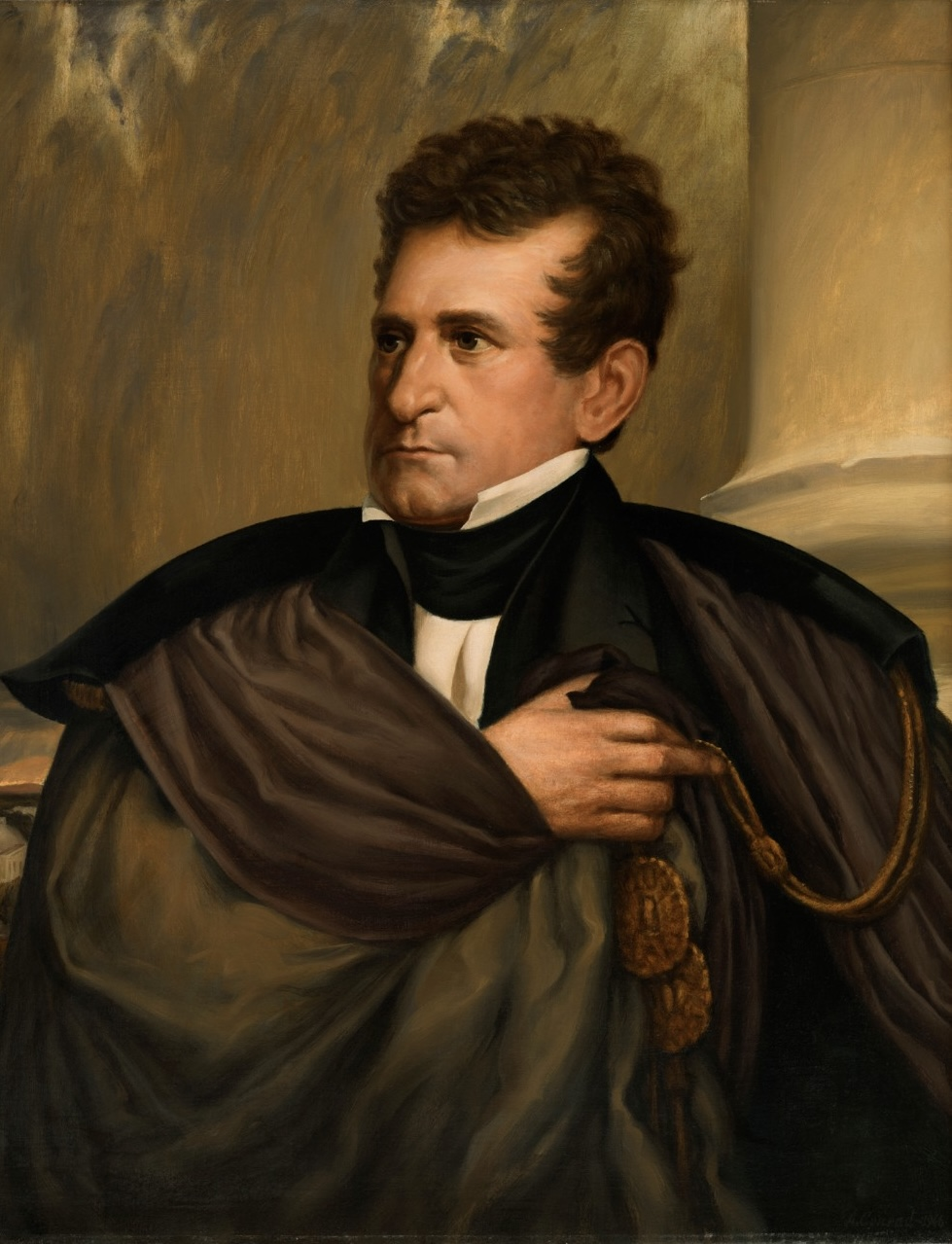
President pro tempore, 1841-42 Samuel L. Southard

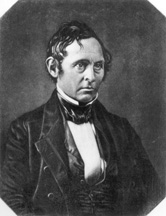
President pro tempore, 1842-43 Willie Person Mangum

=== House of Representatives ===
==== Alabama ====
All representatives were elected statewide on a general ticket.

▌At-large. Reuben Chapman (D)
▌At-large. George S. Houston (D)
▌At-large. Dixon H. Lewis (D)
▌At-large. William W. Payne (D)
▌At-large. Benjamin Shields (D)

==== Arkansas ====
▌At-large. Edward Cross (D)

==== Connecticut ====
▌1. Joseph Trumbull (W)
▌2. William W. Boardman (W)
▌3. Thomas W. Williams (W)
▌4. Thomas B. Osborne (W)
▌5. Truman Smith (W)
▌6. John H. Brockway (W)

==== Delaware ====
▌At-large. George B. Rodney (W)

==== Georgia ====
All representatives were elected statewide on a general ticket.

▌At-large. Julius C. Alford (W), until October 1, 1841

▌Edward J. Black (D), from January 3, 1842

▌At-large. William C. Dawson (W), until November 13, 1841

▌Walter T. Colquitt (D), from January 3, 1842

▌At-large. Thomas F. Foster (W)
▌At-large. Roger L. Gamble (W)
▌At-large. Richard W. Habersham (W), until December 2, 1842

▌George W. Crawford (W), from January 7, 1843

▌At-large. Thomas Butler King (W)
▌At-large. James Meriwether (W)
▌At-large. Eugenius Nisbet (W), until October 12, 1841

▌Mark A. Cooper (D), from January 3, 1842

▌At-large. Lott Warren (W)

==== Illinois ====
▌1. John Reynolds (D)
▌2. Zadok Casey (Ind. D)
▌3. John T. Stuart (W)

==== Indiana ====
▌1. George H. Proffit (W)
▌2. Richard W. Thompson (W)
▌3. Joseph L. White (W)
▌4. James H. Cravens (W)
▌5. Andrew Kennedy (D)
▌6. David Wallace (W)
▌7. Henry S. Lane (W)

==== Kentucky ====
▌1. Linn Boyd (D)
▌2. Philip Triplett (W)
▌3. Joseph R. Underwood (W)
▌4. Bryan Owsley (W)
▌5. John B. Thompson (W)
▌6. Willis Green (W)
▌7. John Pope (W)
▌8. James Sprigg (W)
▌9. John White (W)
▌10. Thomas F. Marshall (W)
▌11. Landaff W. Andrews (W)
▌12. Garrett Davis (W)
▌13. William O. Butler (D)

==== Louisiana ====
▌1. Edward D. White (W)
▌2. John B. Dawson (D)
▌3. John Moore (W)

==== Maine ====
▌1. Nathan Clifford (D)
▌2. William P. Fessenden (W)
▌3. Benjamin Randall (W)
▌4. David Bronson (W), from May 31, 1841
▌5. Nathaniel Littlefield (D)
▌6. Alfred Marshall (D)
▌7. Joshua A. Lowell (D)
▌8. Elisha Allen (W)

==== Maryland ====
The 4th district was a plural district with two representatives.

▌1. Isaac Jones (W)
▌2. James A. Pearce (W)
▌3. James W. Williams (D), until December 2, 1842

▌Charles S. Sewall (D), from January 2, 1843

▌4. John P. Kennedy (W)
▌4. Alexander Randall (W)
▌5. William Cost Johnson (W)
▌6. John Mason (D)
▌7. Augustus R. Sollers (W)

==== Massachusetts ====
▌1. Robert C. Winthrop (W), until May 25, 1842

▌Nathan Appleton (W), from June 9, 1842, until September 28, 1842
▌Robert C. Winthrop (W), from November 29, 1842

▌2. Leverett Saltonstall I (W)
▌3. Caleb Cushing (W)
▌4. William Parmenter (D)
▌5. Levi Lincoln Jr. (W), until March 16, 1841

▌Charles Hudson (W), from May 3, 1841

▌6. Osmyn Baker (W)
▌7. George N. Briggs (W)
▌8. William B. Calhoun (W)
▌9. William S. Hastings (W), until June 17, 1842
▌10. Nathaniel B. Borden (W)
▌11. Barker Burnell (W)
▌12. John Quincy Adams (W)

==== Michigan ====
▌At-large. Jacob M. Howard (W)

==== Mississippi ====
All representatives were elected statewide on a general ticket.

▌At-large. William M. Gwin (D)
▌At-large. Jacob Thompson (D)

==== Missouri ====
All representatives were elected statewide on a general ticket.

▌At-large. John C. Edwards (D)
▌At-large. John Miller (D)

==== New Hampshire ====
All representatives were elected statewide on a general ticket.

▌At-large. Charles G. Atherton (D)
▌At-large. Edmund Burke (D)
▌At-large. Ira A. Eastman (D)
▌At-large. John R. Reding (D)
▌At-large. Tristram Shaw (D)

==== New Jersey ====
All representatives were elected statewide on a general ticket.

▌At-large. John B. Aycrigg (W)
▌At-large. William Halstead (W)
▌At-large. John P. B. Maxwell (W)
▌At-large. Joseph F. Randolph (W)
▌At-large. Charles C. Stratton (W)
▌At-large. Thomas J. Yorke (W)

==== New York ====
There were four plural districts, the 8th, 17th, 22nd & 23rd had two representatives each, the 3rd had four representatives.

▌1. Charles A. Floyd (D)
▌2. Joseph Egbert (D)
▌3. Charles G. Ferris (D)
▌3. John McKeon (D)
▌3. James I. Roosevelt (D)
▌3. Fernando Wood (D)
▌4. Aaron Ward (D)
▌5. Richard D. Davis (D)
▌6. James G. Clinton (D)
▌7. John Van Buren (D)
▌8. Jacob Houck Jr. (D)
▌8. Robert McClellan (D)
▌9. Hiram P. Hunt (W)
▌10. Daniel D. Barnard (W)
▌11. Archibald L. Linn (W)
▌12. Bernard Blair (W)
▌13. Thomas A. Tomlinson (W)
▌14. Henry Bell Van Rensselaer (W)
▌15. John Sanford (D)
▌16. Andrew W. Doig (D)
▌17. David P. Brewster (D)
▌17. John G. Floyd (D)
▌18. Thomas C. Chittenden (W)
▌19. Samuel S. Bowne (D)
▌20. Samuel Gordon (D)
▌21. John C. Clark (W)
▌22. Samuel Partridge (D)
▌22. Lewis Riggs (D)
▌23. Victory Birdseye (W)
▌23. A. Lawrence Foster (W)
▌24. Christopher Morgan (W)
▌25. John Maynard (W)
▌26. Francis Granger (W), until March 5, 1841

▌John Greig (W), from May 21, 1841, until September 25, 1841
▌Francis Granger (W), from November 27, 1841

▌27. William M. Oliver (D)
▌28. Timothy Childs (W)
▌29. Seth M. Gates (W)
▌30. John Young (W)
▌31. Staley N. Clarke (W)
▌32. Millard Fillmore (W)
▌33. Alfred Babcock (W)

==== North Carolina ====
▌1. Kenneth Rayner (W)
▌2. John R. J. Daniel (D)
▌3. Edward Stanly (W)
▌4. William Washington (W)
▌5. James I. McKay (D)
▌6. Archibald H. Arrington (D)
▌7. Edmund Deberry (W)
▌8. Romulus M. Saunders (D)
▌9. Augustine H. Shepperd (W)
▌10. Abraham Rencher (W)
▌11. Greene Caldwell (D)
▌12. James Graham (W)
▌13. Lewis Williams (W), until February 23, 1842

▌Anderson Mitchell (W), from April 27, 1842

==== Ohio ====
▌1. Nathanael G. Pendleton (W)
▌2. John B. Weller (D)
▌3. Patrick Goode (W)
▌4. Jeremiah Morrow (W)
▌5. William Doan (D)
▌6. Calvary Morris (W)
▌7. William Russell (W)
▌8. Joseph Ridgway (W)
▌9. William Medill (D)
▌10. Samson Mason (W)
▌11. Benjamin S. Cowen (W)
▌12. Joshua Mathiot (W)
▌13. James Mathews (D)
▌14. George Sweeny (D)
▌15. Sherlock Andrews (W)
▌16. Joshua R. Giddings (W), until March 22, 1842, and from December 5, 1842
▌17. John Hastings (D)
▌18. Ezra Dean (D)
▌19. Samuel Stokely (W)

==== Pennsylvania ====
There were two plural districts, the 2nd had two representatives, the 4th had three representatives.

▌1. Charles Brown (D)
▌2. George W. Toland (W)
▌2. John Sergeant (W), until September 15, 1841

▌Joseph R. Ingersoll (W), from October 12, 1841

▌3. Charles J. Ingersoll (D)
▌4. Jeremiah Brown (W)
▌4. John Edwards (W)
▌4. Francis James (W)
▌5. Joseph Fornance (D)
▌6. Robert Ramsey (W)
▌7. John Westbrook (D)
▌8. Peter Newhard (D)
▌9. George M. Keim (D)
▌10. William Simonton (W)
▌11. James Gerry (D)
▌12. James Cooper (W)
▌13. Amos Gustine (D)
▌14. James Irvin (W)
▌15. Benjamin A. Bidlack (D)
▌16. John Snyder (D)
▌17. Davis Dimock Jr. (D), until January 13, 1842

▌Almon H. Read (D), from March 18, 1842

▌18. Charles Ogle (W), until May 10, 1841

▌Henry Black (W), from June 28, 1841, until November 28, 1841
▌James M. Russell (W), from December 21, 1841

▌19. Albert G. Marchand (D)
▌20. Enos Hook (D), until April 18, 1841

▌Henry W. Beeson (D), from May 31, 1841

▌21. Joseph Lawrence (W), until April 17, 1842

▌Thomas M. T. McKennan (W), from May 30, 1842

▌22. William W. Irwin (W)
▌23. William Jack (D)
▌24. Thomas Henry (W)
▌25. Arnold Plumer (D)

==== Rhode Island ====
Both representatives were elected statewide on a general ticket.

▌At-large. Robert B. Cranston (W)
▌At-large. Joseph L. Tillinghast (W)

==== South Carolina ====
▌1. Isaac E. Holmes (D)
▌2. Robert Rhett (D)
▌3. John Campbell (D)
▌4. Sampson H. Butler (D), until September 27, 1842

▌Samuel W. Trotti (D), from December 17, 1842

▌5. Francis W. Pickens (D)
▌6. William Butler (W)
▌7. James Rogers (D)
▌8. Thomas D. Sumter (D)
▌9. Patrick C. Caldwell (D)

==== Tennessee ====
▌1. Thomas D. Arnold (W)
▌2. Abraham McClellan (D)
▌3. Joseph L. Williams (W)
▌4. Thomas Campbell (W)
▌5. Hopkins L. Turney (D)
▌6. William B. Campbell (W)
▌7. Robert L. Caruthers (W)
▌8. Meredith P. Gentry (W)
▌9. Harvey M. Watterson (D)
▌10. Aaron V. Brown (D)
▌11. Cave Johnson (D)
▌12. Milton Brown (W)
▌13. Christopher Williams (W)

==== Vermont ====
▌1. Hiland Hall (W)
▌2. William Slade (W)
▌3. Horace Everett (W)
▌4. Augustus Young (W)
▌5. John Mattocks (W)

==== Virginia ====
▌1. Francis Mallory (W)
▌2. George B. Cary (D)
▌3. John W. Jones (D)
▌4. William Goode (D)
▌5. Edmund W. Hubard (D)
▌6. Walter Coles (D)
▌7. William L. Goggin (W)
▌8. Henry A. Wise (W)
▌9. Robert M. T. Hunter (W) (Note: Robert M. T. Hunter is sometimes called a "States' Rights Whig".)
▌10. John Taliaferro (W)
▌11. John M. Botts (W)
▌12. Thomas W. Gilmer (W)
▌13. Linn Banks (D), until December 6, 1841

▌William Smith (D), from December 6, 1841

▌14. Cuthbert Powell (W)
▌15. Richard W. Barton (W)
▌16. William Harris (D)
▌17. Alexander Stuart (W)
▌18. George W. Hopkins (D)
▌19. George W. Summers (W)
▌20. Samuel Hays (D)
▌21. Lewis Steenrod (D)

==== Non-voting members ====
▌Florida Territory. David Levy Yulee (D)
▌Iowa Territory. Augustus C. Dodge (D)
▌Wisconsin Territory. Henry Dodge (D)

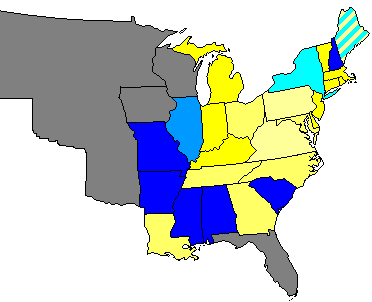
House seats by party holding plurality in state: 80+% to 100% Democratic / Up to 60% Whig; 60+% to 80% Democratic / 60+% to 80% Whig; Up to 60% Democratic / 80+% to 100% Whig

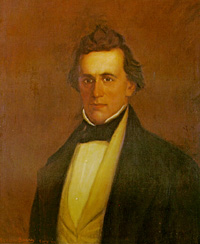
Speaker of the House John White

== Changes in membership ==
The count below reflects changes from the beginning of the first session of this Congress.

=== Senate ===
- Replacements: 9
  - Democrats: no net change
  - Whigs: no net change
- Deaths: 2
- Resignations: 8
- Interim appointments: 0
- Vacancy: 1
- Total seats with changes: 10

Senate changes
State (class)	Vacated by	Reason for change	Successor	Date of successor's formal installation (Note: When seated or oath administered, not necessarily when service began.)
Alabama (3)	Clement C. Clay (D)	Resigned November 15, 1841	Arthur P. Bagby (D)	Elected November 24, 1841
Rhode Island (1)	Nathan F. Dixon (W)	Died January 29, 1842	William Sprague (W)	Elected February 18, 1842
Tennessee (1)	Alfred O. P. Nicholson (D)	Resigned February 7, 1842	Vacant	Not filled this term
New Hampshire (3)	Franklin Pierce (D)	Resigned February 28, 1842	Leonard Wilcox (D)	Appointed March 1, 1842, and subsequently elected
Louisiana (3)	Alexandre Mouton (D)	Resigned March 1, 1842, after being elected Governor of Louisiana	Charles M. Conrad (W)	Appointed April 14, 1842
Kentucky (3)	Henry Clay (W)	Resigned March 31, 1842	John J. Crittenden (W)	Appointed March 31, 1842, and subsequently elected
Vermont (3)	Samuel Prentiss (W)	Resigned April 11, 1842, to become judge of the U.S. District Court of Vermont	Samuel C. Crafts (W)	Appointed April 23, 1842, and subsequently elected
New Jersey (1)	Samuel L. Southard (W)	Died June 26, 1842	William L. Dayton (W)	Appointed July 2, 1842
South Carolina (3)	William C. Preston (W)	Resigned November 29, 1842	George McDuffie (D)	Elected December 23, 1842
Maine (1)	Reuel Williams (D)	Resigned February 15, 1843	Vacant	Not filled this term

=== House of Representatives ===
- Replacements: 17
  - Democrats: 3 seat net gain
  - Whigs: 3 seat net loss
- Deaths: 8
- Resignations: 12
- Contested election: 1
- Total seats with changes: 20

House changes
District	Vacated by	Reason for change	Successor	Date of successor's formal installation
Maine 4th	Vacant	Rep. George Evans resigned in previous congress	David Bronson (W)	Seated May 31, 1841
New York 26th	Francis Granger (W)	Resigned March 5, 1841, after being appointed United States Postmaster General	John Greig (W)	Seated May 21, 1841
Massachusetts 5th	Levi Lincoln Jr. (W)	Resigned March 16, 1841, after being appointed Collector of the port of Boston	Charles Hudson (W)	Seated May 3, 1841
Pennsylvania 20th	Enos Hook (D)	Resigned April 18, 1841	Henry W. Beeson (D)	Seated May 31, 1841
Pennsylvania 18th	Charles Ogle (W)	Died May 10, 1841	Henry Black (W)	Seated June 28, 1841
Pennsylvania 2nd	John Sergeant (W)	Resigned September 15, 1841	Joseph R. Ingersoll (W)	Seated October 12, 1841
New York 26th	John Greig (W)	Resigned September 25, 1841	Francis Granger (W)	Seated November 27, 1841
Georgia at-large	Julius C. Alford (W)	Resigned October 1, 1841	Edward J. Black (D)	Seated January 3, 1842
Georgia at-large	Eugenius A. Nisbet (W)	Resigned October 12, 1841	Mark A. Cooper (D)	Seated January 3, 1842
Georgia at-large	William C. Dawson (W)	Resigned November 13, 1841	Walter T. Colquitt (D)	Seated January 3, 1842
Pennsylvania 18th	Henry Black (W)	Died November 28, 1841	James M. Russell (W)	Seated December 21, 1841
Virginia 13th	Linn Banks (D)	Lost contested election December 6, 1841	William Smith (D)	Seated December 6, 1841
Pennsylvania 17th	Davis Dimock Jr. (D)	Died January 13, 1842	Almon H. Read (D)	Seated March 18, 1842
North Carolina 13th	Lewis Williams (W)	Died February 23, 1842	Anderson Mitchell (W)	Seated April 27, 1842
Ohio 16th	Joshua R. Giddings (W)	Resigned March 22, 1842, after vote of his censure and re-elected to same seat	Joshua R. Giddings (W)	Seated December 5, 1842
Pennsylvania 21st	Joseph Lawrence (W)	Died April 17, 1842	Thomas M. T. McKennan (W)	Seated May 30, 1842
Massachusetts 1st	Robert C. Winthrop (W)	Resigned May 25, 1842	Nathan Appleton (W)	Seated June 9, 1842
Massachusetts 9th	William S. Hastings (W)	Died June 17, 1842	Vacant	Not filled this Congress
South Carolina 4th	Sampson H. Butler (D)	Resigned September 27, 1842	Samuel W. Trotti (D)	Seated December 17, 1842
Massachusetts 1st	Nathan Appleton (W)	Resigned September 28, 1842	Robert C. Winthrop (W)	Seated November 29, 1842
Georgia at-large	Richard W. Habersham (W)	Died December 2, 1842	George W. Crawford (W)	Seated January 7, 1843
Maryland 3rd	James W. Williams (D)	Died December 2, 1842	Charles S. Sewall (D)	Seated January 2, 1843

== Committees ==
Lists of committees and their party leaders.

=== Senate ===
- Agriculture (Chairman: Lewis F. Linn)
- Audit and Control the Contingent Expenses of the Senate (Chairman: Albert S. White then Benjamin Tappan)
- Claims (Chairman: William A. Graham)
- Commerce (Chairman: Jabez Huntington)
- Distributing Public Revenue Among the States (Select)
- District of Columbia (Chairman: Richard H. Bayard)
- Finance (Chairman: Clement C. Clay)
- Fiscal Corporation of the United States (Select)
- Foreign Relations (Chairman: William C. Rives then William S. Archer)
- Indian Affairs (Chairman: James T. Morehead then Albert White)
- Judiciary (Chairman: John M. Berrien)
- Manufactures (Chairman: George Evans)
- Military Affairs (Chairman: William C. Preston then John J. Crittenden)
- Militia (Chairman: Samuel S. Phelps)
- Naval Affairs (Chairman: Willie P. Mangum)
- Patents and the Patent Office (Chairman: Samuel Prentiss then John Leeds Kerr then Samuel S. Phelps)
- Pensions (Chairman: Isaac C. Bates)
- Post Office and Post Roads (Chairman: John Henderson)
- Printing (Chairman: N/A)
- Private Land Claims (Chairman: Richard H. Bayard)
- Public Buildings and Grounds (Chairman: Alexander Barrow)
- Public Lands (Chairman: Oliver H. Smith)
- Revolutionary Claims (Chairman: Nathan F. Dixon)
- Roads and Canals (Chairman: Augustus S. Porter)
- Tariff Regulation (Select)
- Whole

=== House of Representatives ===
- Accounts (Chairman: Osmyn Baker)
- Agriculture (Chairman: Edmund Deberry)
- Apportionment of Representatives (Select)
- Claims (Chairman: Joshua Giddings)
- Commerce (Chairman: John P. Kennedy)
- District of Columbia (Chairman: Joseph R. Underwood)
- Elections (Chairman: William Halstead)
- Expenditures in the Navy Department (Chairman: Thomas Jones Yorke)
- Expenditures in the Post Office Department (Chairman: Joshua A. Lowell)
- Expenditures in the State Department (Chairman: John Van Buren)
- Expenditures in the Treasury Department (Chairman: A. Lawrence Foster)
- Expenditures in the War Department (Chairman: James Iver McKay)
- Expenditures on Public Buildings (Chairman: Cave Johnson)
- Foreign Affairs (Chairman: Caleb Cushing then John Quincy Adams)
- Indian Affairs (Chairman: John Quincy Adams)
- Invalid Pensions (Chairman: Calvary Morris)
- Judiciary (Chairman: Daniel D. Barnard)
- Manufactures (Chairman: Leverett Saltonstall I)
- Memorial of the Agricultural Bank of Mississippi (Select)
- Mileage (Chairman: Thomas W. Williams)
- Military Affairs (Chairman: William C. Dawson)
- Militia (Chairman: George May Keim)
- Naval Affairs (Chairman: Henry A. Wise)
- Patents (Chairman: Thomas B. Osborne)
- Post Office and Post Roads (Chairman: George N. Briggs)
- Private Land Claims (Chairman: John Moore)
- Public Buildings and Grounds (Chairman: William W. Boardman)
- Public Expenditures (Chairman: James Graham)
- Public Lands (Chairman: William C. Johnson then Jeremiah Morrow then Reuben Chapman then Jeremiah Morrow)
- Revisal and Unfinished Business (Chairman: Francis James)
- Revolutionary Claims (Chairman: Hiland Hall)
- Revolutionary Pensions (Chairman: John Taliaferro)
- Roads and Canals (Chairman: Joseph Lawrence)
- Rules (Select)
- Standards of Official Conduct
- Territories (Chairman: Garrett Davis)
- Ways and Means (Chairman: Millard Fillmore)
- Whole

=== Joint committees ===
- Enrolled Bills (Chairman: Sen. Augustus Porter then Sen. William Sprague)
- The Library (Chairman: N/A)

== Employees ==
- Librarian of Congress: John Silva Meehan

=== Senate ===
- Secretary: Asbury Dickins
- Sergeant at Arms: Stephen Haight, until March 8, 1841
  - Edward Dyer, elected March 8, 1841
- Chaplain: George G. Cookman, Methodist, until June 12, 1841
  - Septimus Tustin, Presbyterian, elected June 12, 1841

=== House of Representatives ===
- Clerk: Hugh A. Garland, until May 31, 1841
  - Matthew St. Clair Clarke, elected May 31, 1841
- Sergeant at Arms: Roderick Dorsey, until June 8, 1841
  - Eleazor M. Townsend, elected June 8, 1841
- Doorkeeper: Joseph Follansbee
- Postmaster: William J. McCormick
- Chaplain: John W. French, Episcopalian, elected May 31, 1841
  - John N. Maffit, Methodist, elected December 6, 1841
  - Frederick T. Tiffany, Episcopalian, elected December 5, 1842

== See also ==
- 1840 United States elections (elections leading to this Congress)
  - 1840 United States presidential election
  - 1840–41 United States Senate elections
  - 1840–41 United States House of Representatives elections
- 1842 United States elections (elections during this Congress, leading to the next Congress)
  - 1842–43 United States Senate elections
  - 1842–43 United States House of Representatives elections
