= Henry Black (Pennsylvania politician) =

American politician (1783–1841)

Member of the U.S. House of Representatives from Pennsylvania's 18th district
- In office June 28, 1841 – November 28, 1841
- Preceded by: Charles Ogle
- Succeeded by: James McPherson Russell

Member of the Pennsylvania House of Representatives
- In office 1816-1818

Personal details
- Born: February 25, 1783 Somerset, Pennsylvania
- Died: November 28, 1841 (aged 58) Somerset, Pennsylvania
- Party: Whig

Henry Black (February 25, 1783 – November 28, 1841) was a Whig member of the U.S. House of Representatives from Pennsylvania.

== Early life ==
Henry Black was born near the borough of Somerset, Pennsylvania. He engaged in agricultural pursuits.

== Pennsylvania House of Representatives ==
He served as a member of the Pennsylvania House of Representatives from 1816 to 1818. He was elected as a Democrat in 1816. He was a justice of the peace and appointed by the Governor of Pennsylvania as an associate judge of Somerset County, Pennsylvania, from 1820 to 1840.

== Electoral Tickets ==
Black was on the People's Ticket (electoral ticket) for the Election of 1828, in the 13th district (John Quincy Adams for President and Richard Rush for Vice President). He was also on the Whig Electoral Ticket for the 24th district in the Election of 1840.

== United States House of Representatives ==
Black was elected as a Whig to the Twenty-seventh Congress to fill the vacancy caused by the death of Charles Ogle. The election was held on Tuesday, June 8, 1841. The vote for Black was approximately 2,703 with the opposition (party not named) getting 1,320 votes (Black receiving a majority of 1,383 more votes). The Daily Atlas lists the opposition candidate's name as "Pilson". (However, the same newspaper listed a "Mr. Philson of Somerset" as the opponent in the special election to replace Black after his death.)

== Death ==
Black served in the House of Representatives until his death at his residence in Somerset in 1841. The cause of death was apoplexy.

== Memorials ==
Interment in the family cemetery in Stonycreek Township, Somerset County, Pennsylvania. Cenotaph at Congressional Cemetery in Washington, D.C.

On Thursday, December 9, 1841, his colleague Representative Joseph Lawrence took to the House floor to announce Black's death and provide a eulogy. Lawrence stated that Black was well liked by anyone who came into contact with him. Lawrence indicated that Black was his childhood friend. Lawrence also stated that Black had been in good health the day before his death. Lawrence then submitted a resolution that crepe should be worn in honor of Black's death. The resolution was adopted.

According to the Philadelphia U.S. Gazette (reprinted in the Easton Gazette), he was virtuous and well liked.

== Descendants ==
His son was Attorney General Jeremiah S. Black and his grandson was Pennsylvania Lt. Governor Chauncey Forward Black.

== See also ==
- List of members of the United States Congress who died in office (1790–1899)

== Sources ==
U.S. House of Representatives
Preceded by Charles Ogle	Member of the U.S. House of Representatives from Pennsylvania's 18th congressional district 1841	Succeeded by James M. Russell
