= Patrick Farrelly =

American politician (1770–1826)

Member of the U.S. House of Representatives from Pennsylvania
- In office March 4, 1821 – January 12, 1826
- Preceded by: Robert Moore
- Succeeded by: Thomas Hale Sill
- Constituency: 15th district (1821–1823); 18th district (1823–1826)

Member of the Pennsylvania Senate
- In office 1811-1812

Personal details
- Born: 1770 Kingdom of Ireland
- Died: January 12, 1826 (aged 55–56) Meadville, Pennsylvania, U.S.
- Party: Democratic-Republican

Patrick Farrelly (1770 – January 12, 1826) was a member of the U.S. House of Representatives from Pennsylvania.

== Biography ==
Patrick Farrelly (father of John Wilson Farrelly) was born in the Kingdom of Ireland, a member of the Farrelly family. He immigrated to the United States in 1798. He studied law, was admitted to the bar July 11, 1803, and commenced practice in Meadville, Pennsylvania. He was a member of the Pennsylvania House of Representatives in 1811 and 1812. He served in the War of 1812 as a major of militia.

He was elected a member of the American Antiquarian Society in 1820.

Farrelly was elected as a Republican to the Seventeenth Congress, and was reelected as a Jackson Republican to the Eighteenth Congress and as a Jacksonian candidate to the Nineteenth Congress and served until his death in Meadville in 1826. Interment in Greendale Cemetery.

== See also ==
- List of members of the United States Congress who died in office (1790–1899)

== Sources ==
- United States Congress. "Patrick Farrelly (id: F000032)". Biographical Directory of the United States Congress.
- The Political Graveyard

U.S. House of Representatives
Preceded by Robert Moore	Member of the U.S. House of Representatives from Pennsylvania's 15th congressional district 1821–1823	Succeeded by Thomas Patterson
Preceded by District created	Member of the U.S. House of Representatives from Pennsylvania's 18th congressional district 1823–1826	Succeeded by Thomas Hale Sill
