= John L. Dawson =

American politician (1813–1870)

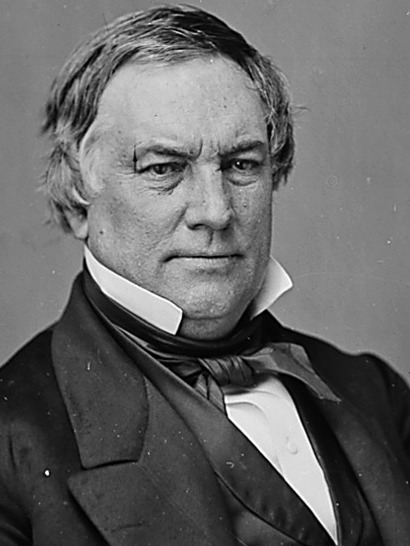

Member of the U.S. House of Representatives from Pennsylvania
- In office March 4, 1863 – March 3, 1867
- Preceded by: James K. Moorhead
- Succeeded by: John Covode
- Constituency: 21st district
- In office March 4, 1851 – March 3, 1855
- Preceded by: Andrew J. Ogle
- Succeeded by: Jonathan Knight
- Constituency: 18th district (1851–1853); 20th district (1853–1855)

Personal details
- Born: February 7, 1813 Uniontown, Pennsylvania, US
- Died: September 18, 1870 (aged 57) Springfield Township, Pennsylvania, US
- Party: Democratic

John Littleton Dawson (February 7, 1813 – September 18, 1870) was a Democratic member of the U.S. House of Representatives from Pennsylvania.

== Early life and education ==
Dawson was born in Uniontown, Pennsylvania, and grew up in Brownsville, Pennsylvania. He graduated from Washington College with a degree in law, was granted admission to the bar in 1835 and ran a small law practice. He served as deputy attorney general for Fayette County, Pennsylvania in 1838 and as district attorney for the western district of Pennsylvania from 1845 until 1848.

== Political career ==
In 1848, he unsuccessfully ran for congress as a Democrat but on subsequent attempts he was elected and served in the 32nd and 33rd congresses, from March 4, 1851, until March 3, 1855, when he stepped down, declining the nomination for the next term. While serving as a congressman he was the chairman of the Committee on Agriculture.

During his time away from congress, President Franklin Pierce offered him the governorship of Kansas Territory, but he declined so that he could run for congress again, which he was elected to again in 1863, and served on the 38th and 39th congresses from March 4, 1863, until March 3, 1867. His vote on the Thirteenth Amendment is recorded as nay.

He was a delegate to Democratic National Convention from Pennsylvania, 1844, 1848, 1860, 1868.

He retired to his home in Springfield Township, Fayette County, Pennsylvania, where he died at age 57. He was interred at Christ Episcopal Churchyard in Brownsville.

In 1860 he was honored as the namesake of Dawson County, Nebraska, in what was then Nebraska Territory.

== Sources ==
- United States Congress. "John L. Dawson (id: D000153)". Biographical Directory of the United States Congress.
- The Political Graveyard
- Infoplease: John Littleton Dawson biography
- Nebraska State Historical Society timeline http://www.nebraskahistory.org/publish/publicat/timeline/dawson-john-l.htm

U.S. House of Representatives
Preceded by Andrew Jackson Ogle	Member of the U.S. House of Representatives from Pennsylvania's 18th congressional district 1851–1853	Succeeded by John McCulloch
Preceded by John Allison	Member of the U.S. House of Representatives from Pennsylvania's 20th congressional district 1853–1855	Succeeded by Jonathan Knight
Preceded by James K. Moorhead	Member of the U.S. House of Representatives from Pennsylvania's 21st congressional district 1863–1867	Succeeded by John Covode
