= Stephen Barlow (Pennsylvania politician) =

American politician

Member of the U.S. House of Representatives from Pennsylvania's 18th district
- In office March 4, 1827 – March 3, 1829
- Preceded by: Thomas Hale Sill
- Succeeded by: Thomas Hale Sill

Personal details
- Born: June 13, 1779 Redding, Connecticut
- Died: August 24, 1845 (aged 66)
- Party: Jacksonian

Stephen Barlow (June 13, 1779 – August 24, 1845) was a Jacksonian member of the U.S. House of Representatives from Pennsylvania.

== Biography ==
Stephen Barlow was born in Redding, Connecticut. He attended the common schools and Yale College. He moved to Meadville, Pennsylvania, in 1816, studied law, was admitted to the bar and commenced practice in Meadville.

Barlow was elected as a Jacksonian to the Twentieth Congress. He was an unsuccessful candidate for reelection in 1828 to the Twenty-first Congress. He resumed the practice of his profession and served in the Pennsylvania House of Representatives from 1829 to 1831. He was appointed as an associate judge of Crawford County, Pennsylvania, in January 1831 and served until his death in Meadville in 1845. Interment in Greendale Cemetery.

== Sources ==
- United States Congress. "Stephen Barlow (id: B000150)". Biographical Directory of the United States Congress.
- The Political Graveyard

U.S. House of Representatives
Preceded by Thomas Hale Sill	Member of the U.S. House of Representatives from Pennsylvania's 18th congressional district 1827–1829	Succeeded by Thomas Hale Sill
