= Enos Hook =

American politician (1804–1841)

Member of the U.S. House of Representatives from Pennsylvania's 20th district
- In office March 4, 1839 – April 18, 1841
- Preceded by: Andrew Buchanan
- Succeeded by: Henry White Beeson

Member of the Pennsylvania House of Representatives from the Greene County district
- In office 1837–1838

Personal details
- Born: December 3, 1804 Waynesburg, Pennsylvania, U.S.
- Died: July 15, 1841 (aged 36) Waynesburg, Pennsylvania, U.S.
- Resting place: Green Mount Cemetery, Waynesburg, Pennsylvania, U.S.
- Party: Democratic
- Spouse: Mary E. Dill
- Profession: Politician, lawyer

Enos Hook (December 3, 1804 – July 15, 1841) was an American politician and lawyer who served in the United States House of Representatives from 1839 until his resignation in 1841, representing the 20th congressional district of Pennsylvania as a Democrat in the 26th United States Congress and the 27th United States Congress.

== Early life and education ==
Hook was born in Waynesburg, Pennsylvania, on December 3, 1804. He studied law.

== Career ==
Hook was admitted to the bar in 1826; he commenced practice in Waynesburg.

Hook served in the Pennsylvania House of Representatives from 1837 to 1838, representing Greene County as a Democrat in the 62nd Pennsylvania General Assembly.

Hook was elected as a Democrat to the 26th United States Congress; his term began on March 4, 1839. Hook was re-elected to the 27th United States Congress, serving until his resignation on April 18, 1841. Democrat Henry White Beeson was elected to serve out the remainder of Hook's term.

Hook missed over 50% of the 751 roll call votes taken between December 1839 and March 1841.

== Personal life and death ==
Hook was married to Mary E. Dill.

Hook died in Waynesburg on July 15, 1841, less than three months after his resignation. He was interred in Green Mount Cemetery, located in Waynesburg.

Pennsylvania House of Representatives
Preceded by —	Member of the Pennsylvania House of Representatives from the Greene County district 1837–1838	Succeeded by —
U.S. House of Representatives
Preceded by Andrew Buchanan	Member of the U.S. House of Representatives from Pennsylvania's 20th congressional district 1839–1841	Succeeded by Henry White Beeson
