= Clement Moore Butler =

American Episcopal priest (1810–1890)

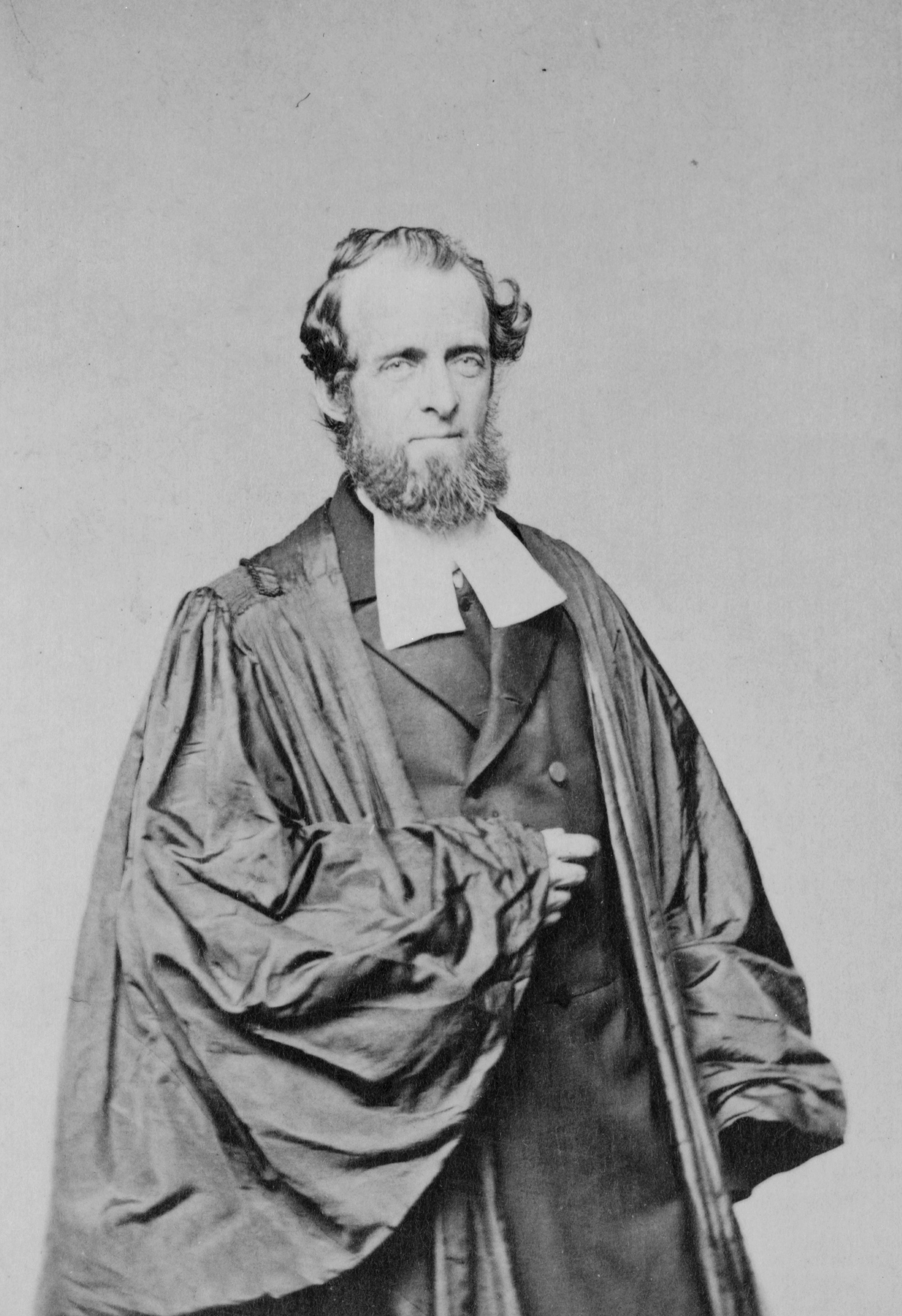
C. M. Butler, ca. 1862

Clement Moore Butler (1810–1890) was an Episcopal priest, author, and seminary professor who served as Chaplain of the Senate from 1850 to 1853.

== Early years ==
Clement Moore Butler was born on October 16, 1810, in Troy, New York, the son of David Butler and Chloe Jones Butler. He was graduated from Trinity College in Hartford, Connecticut, in 1833, and the General Theological Seminary, New York, in 1836. Butler was ordained by Bishop Benjamin Treadwell Onderdonk in June 1837. Onderdonk is alleged to have made improper advances toward Mrs. Butler in a carriage the evening before the ordination. (She was one of a number of women who alleged sexual harassment by the bishop, leading to his suspension.)

== Ministry ==
During the years 1837 through 1854, Butler served congregations in New York City; Palmyra, New York; Georgetown, Washington, D.C.; Boston, Massachusetts; and Trinity Church, Washington, D.C.

He served as chaplain of the United States Senate from 1849 till 1853. On April 1, 1850, he delivered the funeral address for Senator John C. Calhoun. On July 1, 1852, he delivered the funeral address for Henry Clay, Senator, Congressman, and Secretary of State.

From 1854 to 1857, he was rector of Christ Church, Cincinnati, Ohio. He then returned to Washington, where he served Trinity Church once more, through 1861. Butler was thereafter chaplain to the United States minister at Rome, Italy, and the second rector of Grace Church (now St. Paul’s Within the Walls) in Rome (1861–1864).

Butler returned to the United States in 1864, and became professor of ecclesiastical history at the Divinity School of the Protestant Episcopal Church, Philadelphia. He served until 1884, when he retired due to ill health.

Butler died on March 5, 1890, in Germantown, Pennsylvania.

== Personal life ==
In 1836 Butler married Frances Livingston Hart (1816–1895) in Washington, DC. They had three children: Frances Livingston Butler, Helen Moore Butler and Clement Moore Butler. Frances was a niece of Richard Channing Moore, Bishop of Virginia.

== Bibliography ==
- The Year of the Church: Hymns and Devotional Verse (Utica: Eli Maynard, 1839)
- A Farewell Sermon: Preached in Zion Church, Palmyra, N.Y., on Sunday Evening, August 23, 1840 (Peter Force, 1840)
- A Sermon Giving a Historical Account of St. John's Church, Georgetown, D.C., Delivered October 17, 1843 (Georgetown: Gideon, 1844)
- Address Delivered by Rev. Clement M. Butler, at the President's Mansion: On the Occasion of the Funeral of Abel P. Upshur, T.W. Gilmer, and Others, who Lost Their Lives by the Explosion on Board the Princeton, February 28, 1844 (Gideon, 1844) On the USS Princeton (1843) disaster
- A Sermon Delivered in Grace Church, Boston, (Mass.) Whitsunday, May 26, 1844, Being the First Sunday after His Institution as Rector of the Church (Boston: Dutton and Wentworth, 1844) from Project Canterbury
- A Sermon Delivered at the Request of the Board of Missions of the Diocese of Massachusetts, in St. Paul's Church, Boston, on the Evening of the Meeting of the Diocesan Convention, Being Wednesday, June 12, 1844 (Boston: Dutton and Wentworth, 1844)
- The Book of Common Prayer, Interpreted by Its History (Boston and Philadelphia, 1845)
- A Farewell Sermon, Delivered in Grace Church, Boston, February 21, 1847 (Boston: James B. Dow, 1847)
- Old Truths and New Errors (New-York: Stanford and Swords, 1850)
- Obituary Addresses Delivered on the Occasion of the Death of the Hon. John C. Calhoun, a Senator of South Carolina, in the Senate of the United States, April 1, 1850 (Washington, D.C.: Towers, 1850)
- Our Union—God's Gift: A Discourse Delivered in Trinity Church, Washington, D.C., on Thanksgiving Day, November 28, 1850 (Washington, D.C.: J. T. Towers, 1850)
- A Sermon Preached in St. John's Church, Washington, D.C., Sunday, July 14, on the Death of Zachary Taylor, Late President of the United States (Washington, D.C.: C. Alexander, 1850)
- Obituary Addresses on the Occasion of the Death of the Hon. Henry Clay (Washington: Robert Armstrong, 1852)
- Themes for the Past: A Poem, Delivered before the House of Convocation of Trinity College, in Christ Church, Hartford, July 28, 1852 (Hartford: S. Hanmer, 1852).
- A Wise Man Is Strong: A Sermon on the Death of Daniel Webster, Delivered in Trinity Church, Washington, D.C., November 7, 1852 (Washington, D.C.: W. M. Morrison and Co., 1852)
- The Strong Staff Broken and the Beautiful Rod: A Sermon on the Occasion of the Funeral of Henry Clay (1853)
- Modern Necromancy: A Sermon Preached in Trinity Church, Washington City, April 23, 1854 (Washington, D.C.: Gideon, 1854)
- How to Behave Ourselves in the Church of God: The Pastor's Appeal to His People on the Subject of Public Worship (1855)
- Addresses and Lectures on Public Men and Public Affairs Delivered in Washington City, D.C. (Cincinnati: Derby, 1856)
- Private Revenge: A Sermon Preached in Trinity Church, Washington, D.C., Sunday May 8, 1859 (Washington, D.C.: Polkinhorn, 1859)
- The Righteous Statutes and Judgments of the Republic: a Thanksgiving sermon, Delivered in Trinity Church, Washington, Thursday, November 24, 1859 (Washington: Polkinhorn, 1859)
- Lectures on the Book of Revelations [sic] (New York: Robert Carter and Brothers, 1860)
- Republican Loyalty: A Discourse Delivered on Thanksgiving Day, November 29, 1860 (Washington, D.C.: Polkinhorn, 1860)
- The Road to Rome: A Sermon Preached at the Anniversary Meeting of the Auxiliary Evangelical Knowledge Society of the Theological Seminary of the Protestant Episcopal Church, Fairfax County, Virginia, October 29, 1860 (Alexandria: Auxiliary Evangelical Knowledge Society, 1860)
- Funeral Address on the Death of Abraham Lincoln Delivered in the Church of the Covenant, April 19, 1865 (Philadelphia: Ashmead, 1865)
- St. Paul in Rome: Lectures Delivered in the Legation of the United States of America, in Rome (Philadelphia: Lippincott, 1865)
- Inner Rome: Political, Religious, and Social (Philadelphia: Lippincott, 1866)
- Preparation for an Effective and Successful Ministry: An Address Delivered at the Reopening of the Divinity School of the Protestant Episcopal Church, West Philadelphia, in the Church of the Saviour, Thursday, Sept. 19, 1867 (Philadelphia: Mrs. Jane Hamilton, 1867)
- The Ritualism of Law in the Protestant Episcopal Church of the United States (Philadelphia: Mrs. J. Hamilton, 1867)
- An Ecclesiastical History, from the Thirteenth to the Nineteenth Century (Philadelphia: Claxton, 1872)
- The Novel in Its Influence upon Modern Life: A Paper Read before the Church Congress in Cincinnati, Oct. 16, 1878
- The Reformation in Sweden: Its Rise, Progress, and Crisis; and Its Triumph under Charles IX (New York: Randolph, 1883)
- Protestant Episcopal Doctrine and Church Unity (New York: Whittaker, 1887)
  - Roland Post Falkner, Descendants of Clement Moore Butler, D.D. (1933)

Religious titles
Preceded by Henry Slicer	36th US Senate Chaplain; January 9, 1850 – December 7, 1853	Succeeded by Henry Slicer
