= Chauncey Forward =

American politician

Member of the U.S. House of Representatives from Pennsylvania's 13th district
- In office December 4, 1826 – March 3, 1831
- Preceded by: Alexander Thomson
- Succeeded by: George Burd

Member of the Pennsylvania Senate for the 22nd district
- In office 1823–1826
- Preceded by: David Mann
- Succeeded by: Alexander Ogle

Member of the Pennsylvania House of Representatives
- In office 1820-1822

Personal details
- Born: February 4, 1793 Old Granby, Connecticut, US
- Died: October 19, 1839 (aged 46) Somerset, Pennsylvania, US
- Party: Jacksonian
- Relations: Oliver Forward (brother); Walter Forward (brother)

Chauncey Forward (February 4, 1793 – October 19, 1839) was an American politician who served as a Jacksonian member of the U.S. House of Representatives from Pennsylvania.

== Early life and education ==
Forward was born in Old Granby, Connecticut, to Samuel and Susannah Forward. Among his brothers were Oliver Forward and Walter Forward. His grandson was Chauncey Forward Black. He moved with his father to Ohio in 1800, and a short time afterward to Greensburg, Pennsylvania. He pursued classical studies, studied law, was admitted to the bar in Pittsburgh, Pennsylvania, in 1817 and began practice in Somerset, Pennsylvania. He was married to Rebekah Blair of Maryland.

== Career ==
He was a member of the Pennsylvania House of Representatives from 1820 to 1822 and the Pennsylvania State Senate for the 22nd district from 1823 to 1826.

Forward was elected to the Nineteenth Congress to fill the vacancy caused by the resignation of Alexander Thomson. He was reelected to the Twentieth Congress and reelected as a Jacksonian to the Twenty-first Congress. He was appointed prothonotary and recorder of Somerset County, Pennsylvania, in 1831. He died in Somerset in 1839.

== Sources ==
- United States Congress. "Chauncey Forward (id: F000290)". Biographical Directory of the United States Congress.
- The Political Graveyard

Pennsylvania House of Representatives
Preceded by	Member of the Pennsylvania House of Representatives; 1820-1822	Succeeded by
Pennsylvania State Senate
Preceded by David Mann	Member of the Pennsylvania Senate, 22nd district 1823-1826	Succeeded by Alexander Ogle
U.S. House of Representatives
Preceded by Alexander Thomson	Member of the U.S. House of Representatives from Pennsylvania's 13th congressional district 1826–1831	Succeeded by George Burd
