= Thomas Hale Sill =

American politician (1783–1856)

Member of the U.S. House of Representatives from Pennsylvania's 18th district
- In office March 14, 1826 – March 3, 1827
- Preceded by: Patrick Farrelly
- Succeeded by: Stephen Barlow
- In office March 4, 1829 – March 3, 1831
- Preceded by: Stephen Barlow
- Succeeded by: John Banks

Member of the Pennsylvania House of Representatives
- In office 1823

Personal details
- Born: October 11, 1783 Windsor, Connecticut, U.S.
- Died: February 7, 1856 (aged 72) Erie, Pennsylvania, U.S.
- Party: Democratic-Republican; National Republican; Whig
- Education: Brown University

Thomas Hale Sill (October 11, 1783 – February 7, 1856) was a Jacksonian and National Republican member of the U.S. House of Representatives from Pennsylvania.

Thomas Hale Sill was born in Windsor, Connecticut. He graduated from Brown University in Providence, Rhode Island, in 1804, after beginning his college studies at Williams College in 1799. He studied law, was admitted to the bar in 1809 and commenced practice in Lebanon, Ohio. He moved to Erie, Pennsylvania, in 1813 and resumed the practice of law. He was a member of the staff of General Wallace and also a member of the Minutemen of the state militia. He was a deputy United States marshal from 1816 to 1818. He served as burgess of Erie from 1816 to 1817 and deputy attorney general in 1819.

Sill was a member of the Pennsylvania House of Representatives in 1823. He was elected as an Adams candidate to the Nineteenth Congress to fill the vacancy caused by the death of Patrick Farrelly. He again served as burgess of Erie in 1829. He was elected as an Anti-Jacksonian to the Twenty-first Congress. He declined to be a candidate for renomination in 1830. He repeated his service as burgess of Erie in 1833.

He served as President of the Erie branch of the Second Bank of the United States in 1837. He was a delegate to the Pennsylvania constitutional convention in 1837 and 1838. He served one final time as burgess of Erie from 1843 to 1844. He was a presidential elector on the Whig ticket in 1848. He served as postmaster of Erie from 1847 to 1853, and as a director of the Erie Academy for more than thirty years. He engaged in the practice of his profession until his death in Erie in 1856. He is buried in Erie Cemetery.

== Sources ==
- United States Congress. "Thomas Hale Sill (id: S000410)". Biographical Directory of the United States Congress.
- The Political Graveyard

U.S. House of Representatives
Preceded by Patrick Farrelly	Member of the U.S. House of Representatives from Pennsylvania's 18th congressional district March 14, 1826–1827	Succeeded by Stephen Barlow
Preceded by Stephen Barlow	Member of the U.S. House of Representatives from Pennsylvania's 18th congressional district 1829–1831	Succeeded by John Banks
