= Pennsylvania's 18th congressional district =

U.S. House district for Pennsylvania

Coordinates: 40°10′14″N 80°01′39″W

- Obsolete district
- Created: 1820
- Eliminated: 2020
- Years active: 1823–2023

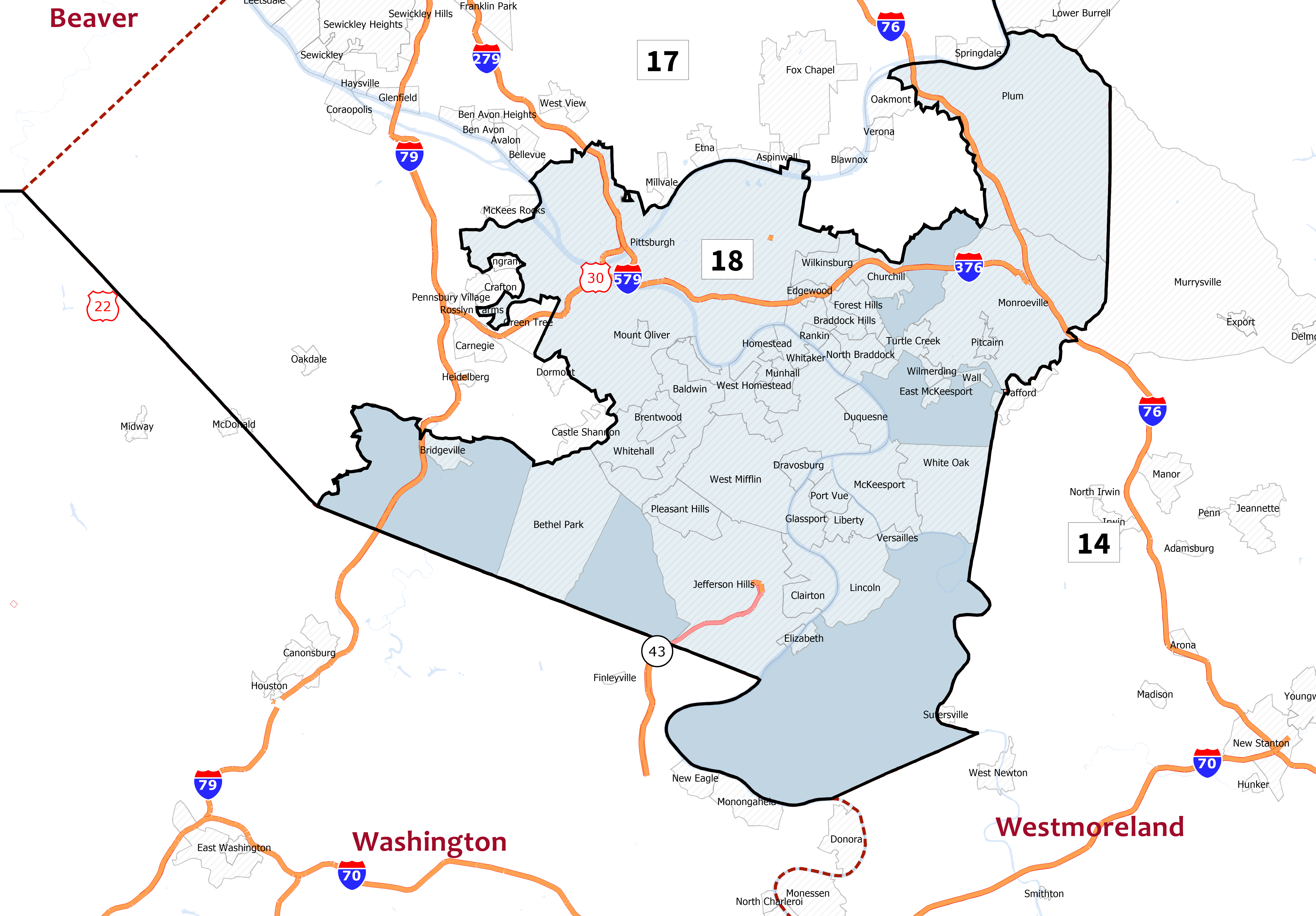
The district's boundaries since the 2018 elections until those in 2020

Pennsylvania's 18th congressional district was a district including the city of Pittsburgh and parts of surrounding suburbs. A variety of working class and majority black suburbs located to the east of the city were included, such as McKeesport and Wilkinsburg. Also a major part of the district was a number of middle class suburbs that have historic Democratic roots, such as Pleasant Hills and Penn Hills. The district became obsolete following the 2020 United States census. It was largely replaced by Pennsylvania's 12th congressional district.

The district covered much of the area that was the center of the Whiskey Rebellion of the 1790s.

== History ==
=== Pre-2018 boundaries ===
In February 2018, the Supreme Court of Pennsylvania ruled that the district map violated the state constitution due to gerrymandering and redrew all of the state's congressional districts. The 18th and 14th districts swapped numbers and had their boundaries adjusted for the 2018 elections (after March's special election) and thereafter.

Before the court-ordered redistricting in February 2018, the district was concentrated in the southern suburbs of Pittsburgh. It was predominantly white, although it contained a diverse range of suburbs. It was drawn in such a way that in some locations, neighborhoods and even streets were split between the 18th and the neighboring 12th and 14th districts. In parts of the eastern portion of the district, one side of the street was in the 12th while the other side was in the 18th. In the west, one side of the street was in the 14th while the other side was in the 18th.

Although there were 35,000 more Democrats in the district than Republicans in 2018, the district had been trending increasingly Republican since the mid-1990s; most of the district's state legislators were Republicans. The district was home to many large coal mines and the energy industry was an important employer. The western part of the district contained some rural regions of Washington County, as well as the very wealthy suburbs in the northern part of that county, which tends to be more Republican than the part contained in the neighboring 9th District. The district also contained many of Allegheny County's southern suburbs of Pittsburgh, which ranged from traditionally wealthy areas such as Upper St. Clair to middle-class communities such as Bethel Park and working-class labor towns such as Elizabeth.

The district skewed older and had the second-oldest electorate in the state in 2017.

The district wound along the eastern suburbs at the edge of Allegheny County, including most of the large suburban commercial center of Monroeville, and in western Westmoreland County. Central Westmoreland County, including the city of Greensburg, was also part of the district. It also contained the rural foothills of the county at the district's eastern end. Westmoreland County has become a major Republican stronghold.

=== Voter registration ===
Party enrollment as of October 18, 2021
Party	Total voters	Percentage
Democratic	328,743	62.84%
Republican	118,874	22.72%
Independent/other parties	75,486	14.43%
Total	523,103	100%

== Dissolution ==
The district became obsolete following the 2020 United States census. It was largely replaced by Pennsylvania's 12th congressional district, while some suburbs of Pittsburgh, such as Wilkinsburg, were redrawn into the 17th district.

== Election results from statewide races ==
Year	Office	Results
2008	President	Obama 63% - 36%
2008	Attorney General	Morganelli 55% - 45%
2008	Auditor General	Wagner 78% - 22%
2010	Senate	Sestak 61% - 39%
2010	Governor	Onorato 56% - 44%
2012	President	Obama 63% - 35%
2012	Senate	Casey Jr. 67% - 33%
2014	Governor	Wolf 65% - 35%
2016	President	Clinton 62% - 35%
2016	Senate	McGinty 62% - 34%
2016	Attorney General	Shapiro 66% - 34%
2016	Auditor General	DePasquale 68% - 27%
2016	Treasurer	Torsella 65% - 29%
2018	Senate	Casey Jr. 71% - 27%
2018	Governor	Wolf 72% - 26%
2020	President	Biden 65% - 34%
2020	Attorney General	Shapiro 67% - 30%
2020	Auditor General	Ahmad 62% - 34%
2020	Treasurer	Torsella 63% - 33%

== List of members representing the district ==
Representatives	Party	Years	Cong ress	Electoral history	District map
District established March 4, 1823
Patrick Farrelly (Meadville)	Jacksonian; Republican	March 4, 1823 – March 3, 1825	18th 19th	Redistricted from the 15th district and re-elected in 1822. Re-elected in 1824. Died.	1823–1833 [data missing]
Patrick Farrelly (Meadville)	Jacksonian	March 4, 1825 – January 12, 1826	18th 19th	Redistricted from the 15th district and re-elected in 1822. Re-elected in 1824. Died.	1823–1833 [data missing]
Vacant		January 12, 1826 – March 14, 1826	19th		1823–1833 [data missing]
Thomas H. Sill (Erie)	Anti-Jacksonian	March 14, 1826 – March 3, 1827	19th	Elected to finish Farrelly's term. Lost re-election.	1823–1833 [data missing]
Stephen Barlow (Meadville)	Jacksonian	March 4, 1827 – March 3, 1829	20th	Elected in 1826. Lost re-election.	1823–1833 [data missing]
Thomas H. Sill (Erie)	Anti-Jacksonian	March 4, 1829 – March 3, 1831	21st	Elected in 1828. Retired.	1823–1833 [data missing]
John Banks (Mercer)	Anti-Masonic	March 4, 1831 – March 3, 1833	22nd	Elected in 1830. Redistricted to the 24th district.	1823–1833 [data missing]
George Burd (Bedford)	Anti-Jacksonian	March 4, 1833 – March 3, 1835	23rd	Redistricted from the 13th district and re-elected in 1832. Retired.	1833–1843 [data missing]
Job Mann (Bedford)	Jacksonian	March 4, 1835 – March 3, 1837	24th	Elected in 1834. Lost re-election.	1833–1843 [data missing]
Charles Ogle (Somerset)	Anti-Masonic	March 4, 1837 – March 3, 1841	25th 26th 27th	Elected in 1836. Re-elected in 1838. Elected in 1840. Died.	1833–1843 [data missing]
Charles Ogle (Somerset)	Whig	March 4, 1841 – May 10, 1841	25th 26th 27th	Elected in 1836. Re-elected in 1838. Elected in 1840. Died.	1833–1843 [data missing]
Vacant		May 10, 1841 – June 28, 1841	27th		1833–1843 [data missing]
Henry Black (Somerset)	Whig	June 28, 1841 – November 28, 1841	27th	Elected to finish Ogle's term. Died.	1833–1843 [data missing]
Vacant		November 28, 1841 – December 21, 1841	27th		1833–1843 [data missing]
James M. Russell (Bedford)	Whig	December 21, 1841 – March 3, 1843	27th	Elected to finish Black's term. Retired.	1833–1843 [data missing]
Andrew Stewart (Uniontown)	Whig	March 4, 1843 – March 3, 1849	28th 29th 30th	Elected in 1843. Re-elected in 1844. Re-elected in 1846. Retired.	1843–1853 [data missing]
Andrew J. Ogle (Somerset)	Whig	March 4, 1849 – March 3, 1851	31st	Elected in 1848. Lost re-election.	1843–1853 [data missing]
John L. Dawson (Brownsville)	Democratic	March 4, 1851 – March 3, 1853	32nd	Elected in 1850. Redistricted to the 20th district.	1843–1853 [data missing]
John McCulloch (Shaver's Creek)	Whig	March 4, 1853 – March 3, 1855	33rd	Elected in 1852. Retired.	1853–1863 [data missing]
John R. Edie (Somerset)	Opposition	March 4, 1855 – March 3, 1857	34th 35th	Elected in 1854. Re-elected in 1856. Retired.	1853–1863 [data missing]
John R. Edie (Somerset)	Republican	March 4, 1857 – March 3, 1859	34th 35th	Elected in 1854. Re-elected in 1856. Retired.	1853–1863 [data missing]
Samuel S. Blair (Hollidaysburg)	Republican	March 4, 1859 – March 3, 1863	36th 37th	Elected in 1858. Re-elected in 1860. Lost re-election.	1853–1863 [data missing]
James T. Hale (Bellefonte)	Independent Republican	March 4, 1863 – March 3, 1865	38th	Redistricted from the 15th district and re-elected in 1862. [data missing]	1863–1873 [data missing]
Stephen F. Wilson (Wellsboro)	Republican	March 4, 1865 – March 3, 1869	39th 40th	Elected in 1864. Re-elected in 1866. Resigned to become judge of the fourth judicial district of Pennsylvania.	1863–1873 [data missing]
William H. Armstrong (Williamsport)	Republican	March 4, 1869 – March 3, 1871	41st	Elected in 1868. Lost re-election.	1863–1873 [data missing]
Henry Sherwood (Wellsboro)	Democratic	March 4, 1871 – March 3, 1873	42nd	Elected in 1870. Lost re-election.	1863–1873 [data missing]
Sobieski Ross (Coudersport)	Republican	March 4, 1873 – March 3, 1875	43rd	Elected in 1872. Redistricted to the 16th district.	1873–1883 [data missing]
William Stenger (Chambersburg)	Democratic	March 4, 1875 – March 3, 1879	44th 45th	Elected in 1874. Re-elected in 1876. Lost re-election.	1873–1883 [data missing]
Horatio G. Fisher (Huntingdon)	Republican	March 4, 1879 – March 3, 1883	46th 47th	Elected in 1878. Re-elected in 1880. Retired.	1873–1883 [data missing]
Louis E. Atkinson (Mifflintown)	Republican	March 4, 1883 – March 3, 1893	48th 49th 50th 51st 52nd	Elected in 1882. Re-elected in 1884. Re-elected in 186. Re-elected in 1888. Re-elected in 1890. Withdrew from election.	1883–1893 [data missing]
Thaddeus M. Mahon (Chambersburg)	Republican	March 4, 1893 – March 3, 1903	53rd 54th 55th 56th 57th	Elected in 1892. Re-elected in 1894. Re-elected in 1896. Re-elected in 1898. Re-elected in 1900. Redistricted to the 17th district.	1893–1903 [data missing]
Marlin E. Olmsted (Harrisburg)	Republican	March 4, 1903 – March 3, 1913	58th 59th 60th 61st 62nd	Redistricted from the 14th district and re-elected in 1902. Re-elected in 1904. Re-elected in 1906. Re-elected in 1908. Re-elected in 1910. Retired.	1903–1913 [data missing]
Aaron S. Kreider (Annville)	Republican	March 4, 1913 – March 3, 1923	63rd 64th 65th 66th 67th	Elected in 1912. Re-elected in 1914. Re-elected in 1916. Re-elected in 1918. Re-elected in 1920. Lost re-election.	1913–1933 [data missing]
Edward M. Beers (Mount Union)	Republican	March 4, 1923 – April 21, 1932	68th 69th 70th 71st 72nd	Elected in 1922. Re-elected in 1924. Re-elected in 1926. Re-elected in 1928. Re-elected in 1930. Died.	1913–1933 [data missing]
Vacant		April 11, 1932 – November 8, 1932	72nd		1913–1933 [data missing]
Joseph F. Biddle (Huntingdon)	Republican	November 8, 1932 – March 3, 1933	72nd	Elected to finish Beers's term. Retired.	1913–1933 [data missing]
Benjamin K. Focht (Lewisburg)	Republican	March 4, 1933 – March 27, 1937	73rd 74th 75th	Elected in 1932. Re-elected in 1934. Re-elected in 1936. Died.	1933–1943 [data missing]
Vacant		March 27, 1937 – May 11, 1937	75th		1933–1943 [data missing]
Richard M. Simpson (Huntingdon)	Republican	May 11, 1937 – January 3, 1945	75th 76th 77th 78th	Elected to finish Focht's term. Re-elected in 1938. Re-elected in 1940. Re-elected in 1942. Redistricted to the 17th district.	1933–1943 [data missing]
Richard M. Simpson (Huntingdon)	Republican	May 11, 1937 – January 3, 1945	75th 76th 77th 78th	Elected to finish Focht's term. Re-elected in 1938. Re-elected in 1940. Re-elected in 1942. Redistricted to the 17th district.	1933–1953 [data missing]
John C. Kunkel (Harrisburg)	Republican	January 3, 1945 – January 3, 1951	79th 80th 81st	Redistricted from the 19th district and re-elected in 1944. Re-elected in 1946. Re-elected in 1948.	1933–1953 [data missing]
Walter M. Mumma (Harrisburg)	Republican	January 3, 1951 – January 3, 1953	82nd	Elected in 1950. Redistricted to the 16th district.	1933–1953 [data missing]
Richard M. Simpson (Huntingdon)	Republican	January 3, 1953 – January 7, 1960	83rd 84th 85th 86th	Redistricted from the 17th district and re-elected in 1952. Re-elected in 1954. Re-elected in 1956. Re-elected in 1958. Died.	1953–1963 [data missing]
Vacant		January 7, 1960 – April 26, 1960	86th		1953–1963 [data missing]
Douglas H. Elliot (Chambersburg)	Republican	April 26, 1960 – June 19, 1960	86th	Elected to finish Simpson's term. Died.	1953–1963 [data missing]
Vacant		June 19, 1960 – November 8, 1960	86th		1953–1963 [data missing]
J. Irving Whalley (Windber)	Republican	November 8, 1960 – January 3, 1963	86th 87th	Elected to finish Elliot's term. Also elected to the next term in 1960. Redistricted to the 12th district.	1953–1963 [data missing]
Robert J. Corbett (Pittsburgh)	Republican	January 3, 1963 – April 25, 1971	88th 89th 90th 91st 92nd	Redistricted from the 29th district and re-elected in 1962. Re-elected in 1964. Re-elected in 1966. Re-elected in 1968. Re-elected in 1970. Died.	1963–1973 [data missing]
Vacant		April 25, 1971 – November 2, 1971	92nd		1963–1973 [data missing]
John Heinz (Pittsburgh)	Republican	November 2, 1971 – January 3, 1977	92nd 93rd 94th	Elected to finish Corbett's term. Re-elected in 1972. Re-elected in 1974. Retired to run for U.S. Senator.	1963–1973 [data missing]
John Heinz (Pittsburgh)	Republican	November 2, 1971 – January 3, 1977	92nd 93rd 94th	Elected to finish Corbett's term. Re-elected in 1972. Re-elected in 1974. Retired to run for U.S. Senator.	1973–1983 [data missing]
Doug Walgren (Mt. Lebanon)	Democratic	January 3, 1977 – January 3, 1991	95th 96th 97th 98th 99th 100th 101st	Elected in 1976. Re-elected in 1978. Re-elected in 1980. Re-elected in 1982. Re-elected in 1984. Re-elected in 1986. Re-elected in 1988. Lost re-election.	1973–1983 [data missing]
Doug Walgren (Mt. Lebanon)	Democratic	January 3, 1977 – January 3, 1991	95th 96th 97th 98th 99th 100th 101st	Elected in 1976. Re-elected in 1978. Re-elected in 1980. Re-elected in 1982. Re-elected in 1984. Re-elected in 1986. Re-elected in 1988. Lost re-election.	1983–1993 [data missing]
Rick Santorum (Mt. Lebanon)	Republican	January 3, 1991 – January 3, 1995	102nd 103rd	Elected in 1990. Re-elected in 1992. Retired to run for U.S. Senator.	1983–1993 [data missing]
Rick Santorum (Mt. Lebanon)	Republican	January 3, 1991 – January 3, 1995	102nd 103rd	Elected in 1990. Re-elected in 1992. Retired to run for U.S. Senator.	1993–2003 [data missing]
Mike Doyle (Swissvale)	Democratic	January 3, 1995 – January 3, 2003	104th 105th 106th 107th	Elected in 1994. Re-elected in 1996. Re-elected in 1998. Re-elected in 2000. Redistricted to the 14th district.	1993–2003 [data missing]
Tim Murphy (Upper St. Clair)	Republican	January 3, 2003 – October 21, 2017	108th 109th 110th 111th 112th 113th 114th 115th	Elected in 2002. Re-elected in 2004. Re-elected in 2006. Re-elected in 2008. Re-elected in 2010. Re-elected in 2012. Re-elected in 2014. Re-elected in 2016. Resigned.	2003–2013
Tim Murphy (Upper St. Clair)	Republican	January 3, 2003 – October 21, 2017	108th 109th 110th 111th 112th 113th 114th 115th	Elected in 2002. Re-elected in 2004. Re-elected in 2006. Re-elected in 2008. Re-elected in 2010. Re-elected in 2012. Re-elected in 2014. Re-elected in 2016. Resigned.	2013–2019
Vacant		October 21, 2017 – March 13, 2018	115th		2013–2019
Conor Lamb (Mt. Lebanon)	Democratic	March 13, 2018 – January 3, 2019	115th	Elected to finish Murphy's term. Redistricted to the 17th district.	2013–2019
Mike Doyle (Forest Hills)	Democratic	January 3, 2019 – December 31, 2022	116th 117th	Redistricted from the 14th district and re-elected in 2018. Re-elected in 2020. Redistricted to the 12th district and resigned early.	2019–2023
Vacant		December 31, 2022 – January 3, 2023	117th		2019–2023
District dissolved January 3, 2023

== Recent election results ==
=== 2012 ===
Pennsylvania's 18th congressional district, 2012
Party	Candidate	Votes	%
Republican	Tim Murphy (incumbent)	216,727	64.0
Democratic	Larry Maggi	122,146	36.0
Total votes		338,873	100.0
Republican hold			

=== 2014 ===
Pennsylvania's 18th congressional district, 2014
Party	Candidate	Votes	%
Republican	Tim Murphy (incumbent)	166,076	100.0
Total votes		166,076	100.0
Republican hold			

=== 2016 ===
Pennsylvania's 18th congressional district, 2016
Party	Candidate	Votes	%
Republican	Tim Murphy (incumbent)	293,684	100.0
Total votes		293,684	100.0
Republican hold			

=== 2018 special election ===
Pennsylvania's 18th congressional district special election, 2018
Party	Candidate	Votes	%	±%
Democratic	Conor Lamb	114,102	49.86%	+49.86%
Republican	Rick Saccone	113,347	49.53%	−50.47%
Libertarian	Drew Gray Miller	1,381	0.60%	+0.60%
Total votes		228,830	100.00%	
Plurality		755	0.33%	-99.67%
Democratic gain from Republican				

=== 2018 ===
Pennsylvania's 18th congressional district, 2018
Party	Candidate	Votes	%
Democratic	Mike Doyle (incumbent)	231,472	100.0
Total votes		231,472	100.0
Democratic hold			

=== 2020 ===
Pennsylvania's 18th congressional district, 2020
Party	Candidate	Votes	%
Democratic	Mike Doyle (incumbent)	266,084	69.3
Republican	Luke Negron	118,163	30.7
Total votes		384,247	100.0
Democratic hold			

== See also ==
- List of United States congressional districts
- Pennsylvania's congressional districts
