= Andrew Stewart (American politician, born 1791) =

American politician (1791–1872)

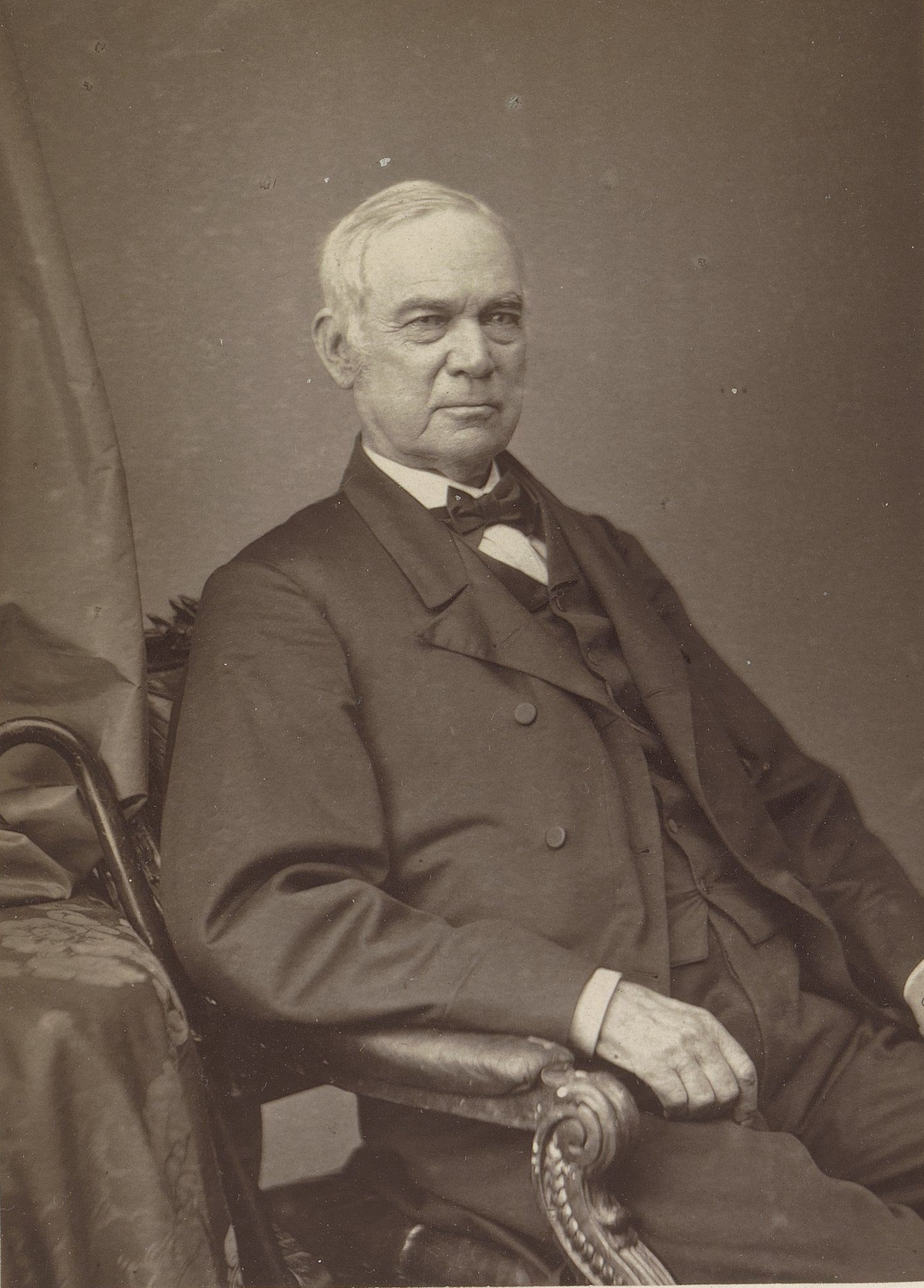

Member of the U.S. House of Representatives from Pennsylvania
- In office March 4, 1821 – March 4, 1829
- Preceded by: Christian Tarr (13th); Walter Forward (14th)
- Succeeded by: John Tod (13th); Thomas Irwin (14th)
- Constituency: 13th district (1821-23); 14th district (1823-29)
- In office March 4, 1831 – March 4, 1835
- Preceded by: Thomas Irwin (14th); District established (20th)
- Succeeded by: Joseph Henderson (14th); Andrew Buchanan (20th)
- Constituency: 14th district (1831-33); 20th district (1833-35)
- In office March 4, 1843 – March 4, 1849
- Preceded by: James M. Russell
- Succeeded by: Andrew J. Ogle
- Constituency: 18th district

Member of the Pennsylvania House of Representatives
- In office 1815–1818

Personal details
- Born: June 11, 1791 near Uniontown, Pennsylvania, U.S.
- Died: July 16, 1872 (aged 81) Uniontown, Pennsylvania, U.S.
- Resting place: Union Cemetery
- Party: Democratic-Republican; Jackson Republican; Jacksonian; Anti-Masonic; Whig; Republican
- Children: Andrew Stewart
- Education: Washington College
- Occupation: Politician; lawyer

Andrew Stewart (June 11, 1791 – July 16, 1872) was a member of the U.S. House of Representatives from Pennsylvania.

== Early life ==
Andrew Stewart was born on June 11, 1791, near Uniontown, Pennsylvania. He graduated from Washington College (now Washington & Jefferson College) in Washington, Pennsylvania. He was one of the founders of the Union Literary Society at Washington College. He studied law and was admitted to the bar in 1815.

== Career ==
Stewart commenced practice in Uniontown. He was a member of the Pennsylvania House of Representatives from 1815 to 1818. He was appointed by President James Monroe as the first U.S. District Attorney for the newly created United States District Court for the Western District of Pennsylvania based in Pittsburgh, serving until 1821.

Stewart was elected as a Democratic-Republican to the Seventeenth Congress, reelected as a Jackson Republican to the Eighteenth Congress, elected as a Jacksonian to the Nineteenth Congress, and reelected as an Adams candidate to the Twentieth Congress. He was elected as an Anti-Masonic candidate to the Twenty-second and Twenty-third Congresses. He was an unsuccessful candidate for reelection in 1834.

Stewart was elected as a Whig to the Twenty-eighth, Twenty-ninth, and Thirtieth Congresses. He served as chairman of the United States House Committee on Manufactures during the Thirtieth Congress. In 1848 he declined to be a candidate for renomination. He was given the nickname "Tariff Andy" for his association with tariffs.

He was affiliated with the Republican Party, and was a delegate at the 1860 Republican National Convention. He was an unsuccessful candidate for election in 1870. He was largely interested in building and real estate. He was instrumental in the construction of Madison College.

== Personal life ==
Stewart was the father of Andrew Stewart, who also served as U.S. Representative.

Stewart died on July 16, 1872, in Uniontown and was interred in Union Cemetery.

U.S. House of Representatives
Preceded by Christian Tarr	Member of the U.S. House of Representatives from Pennsylvania's 13th congressional district 1821–1823	Succeeded by John Tod
Preceded by Walter Forward	Member of the U.S. House of Representatives from Pennsylvania's 14th congressional district 1823–1829	Succeeded by Thomas Irwin
Preceded by Thomas Irwin	Member of the U.S. House of Representatives from Pennsylvania's 14th congressional district 1831–1833	Succeeded by Joseph Henderson
Preceded by District Created	Member of the U.S. House of Representatives from Pennsylvania's 20th congressional district 1833–1835	Succeeded by Andrew Buchanan
Preceded by James McPherson Russell	Member of the U.S. House of Representatives from Pennsylvania's 18th congressional district 1843–1849	Succeeded by Andrew Jackson Ogle
