= Henry White Beeson =

American politician (1791–1863)

Member of the U.S. House of Representatives from Pennsylvania's 20th district
- In office May 31, 1841 – March 4, 1843
- Preceded by: Enos Hook
- Succeeded by: John Dickey

Personal details
- Born: September 14, 1791 Uniontown, Pennsylvania, U.S.
- Died: October 28, 1863 (aged 72) North Union Township, Fayette County, Pennsylvania, U.S.
- Resting place: Oak Grove Cemetery, South Union Township, Pennsylvania, U.S.
- Party: Democratic
- Spouse(s): Nancy Jackson; Louisa Ann Clark
- Children: 4
- Parent(s): Jacob Beeson; Lydia Ann White
- Occupation: Politician

Henry White Beeson (September 14, 1791 – October 28, 1863) was an American politician who served in the United States House of Representatives from 1841 to 1843, representing the 20th congressional district of Pennsylvania as a Democrat in the 27th United States Congress.

== Early life and education ==
Beeson was born in Uniontown, Pennsylvania, on September 14, 1791, to Jacob Beeson and Lydia Ann (née White) Beeson. He attended public schools and engaged in agricultural pursuits.

== Career ==
Beeson served as a colonel in the Fayette County Militia.

Beeson served in the United States House of Representatives from 1841 to 1843, representing the 20th congressional district of Pennsylvania as a Democrat in the 27th United States Congress. He was elected to fill the vacancy caused by the resignation of incumbent Enos Hook.

Beeson was an unsuccessful candidate for re-election in 1842 to the 28th United States Congress. Following his tenure in Congress, Beeson resumed agricultural pursuits.

== Personal life and death ==
Beeson married Nancy Jackson and Louisa Ann Clark. He had four children.

Beeson died at the age of 72 in North Union Township, Fayette County, Pennsylvania, on October 28, 1863. He was interred in Oak Hill Cemetery, located in South Union Township, Pennsylvania.

U.S. House of Representatives
| Preceded by Enos Hook | Member of the U.S. House of Representatives from Pennsylvania's 20th congressional district 1841–1843 | Succeeded by John Dickey |
