= Alexander Thomson (Pennsylvania politician) =

American politician

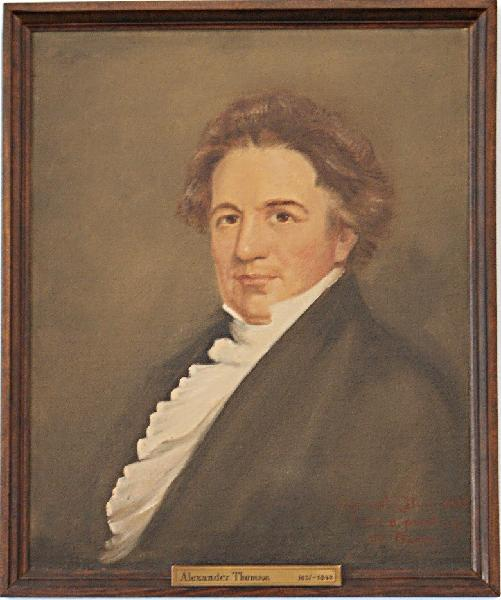

Member of the U.S. House of Representatives from Pennsylvania's 13th district
- In office December 6, 1824 – May 1, 1826
- Preceded by: John Tod
- Succeeded by: Chauncey Forward

Pennsylvania House of Representatives
- In office 1823–1824

District Court Judge
- In office May 2, 1826 – 1841

President Judge of the Sixteenth Judicial District
- In office June 25, 1827 – 1841

Personal details
- Born: January 12, 1788 Franklin County, Pennsylvania, United States
- Died: August 2, 1848 (aged 60) Chambersburg, Pennsylvania, United States
- Occupation: Lawyer, legislator, judge, law professor

Alexander Thomson (January 12, 1788 – August 2, 1848) was a member of the U.S. House of Representatives from Pennsylvania in the mid-1820s, judge, and law professor. He opened a law school in Chambersburg, that became the law department of Marshall College.

== Early life and education ==
Alexander Thomson was born at Scotland, Franklin County, Pennsylvania, both of his parents died young. His father was Archibald Thomson, who served during the Revolutionary War, and died December 1801. His mother was Ann Thomson, who died after 1801. Alexander was the grandson of immigrant Alexander Thomson who arrived from Scotland in 1771 and settled with his wife and 12 children near Chambersburg, Pennsylvania.

Thomson was the eldest of six children. His siblings were James, Elizabeth, Jane, Agnes, and Hannah. When he was 15, he was apprenticed as a sickle maker with his uncle, Andrew Thomson. He was a self-taught scholar of Latin and Greek languages. He was hired by Reverend Isaac Grier to be a tutor at his classical school in the Cumberland Valley. While there, he also furthered his education. After three years, he moved to Bedford, where he taught languages at the Bedford Classical Academy.

== Career ==
He studied law under Judge James Riddle in Bedford, was admitted to the bar in 1816, and commenced practice in Chambersburg, Pennsylvania. He held several local offices and was a member of the Pennsylvania House of Representatives in 1823.

In 1824, Thomson was elected to the Eighteenth Congress to fill the vacancy caused by the resignation of John Tod. He was reelected to the Nineteenth Congress and served until May 1, 1826, when he resigned. He was immediately commissioned assistant judge of the District Court of the City and County of Lancaster, and the Counties of York and Dauphin. He was commissioned president judge of the Sixteenth Judicial District, composed of Franklin, Bedford and Somerset Counties, on June 25, 1827 and served until 1841.

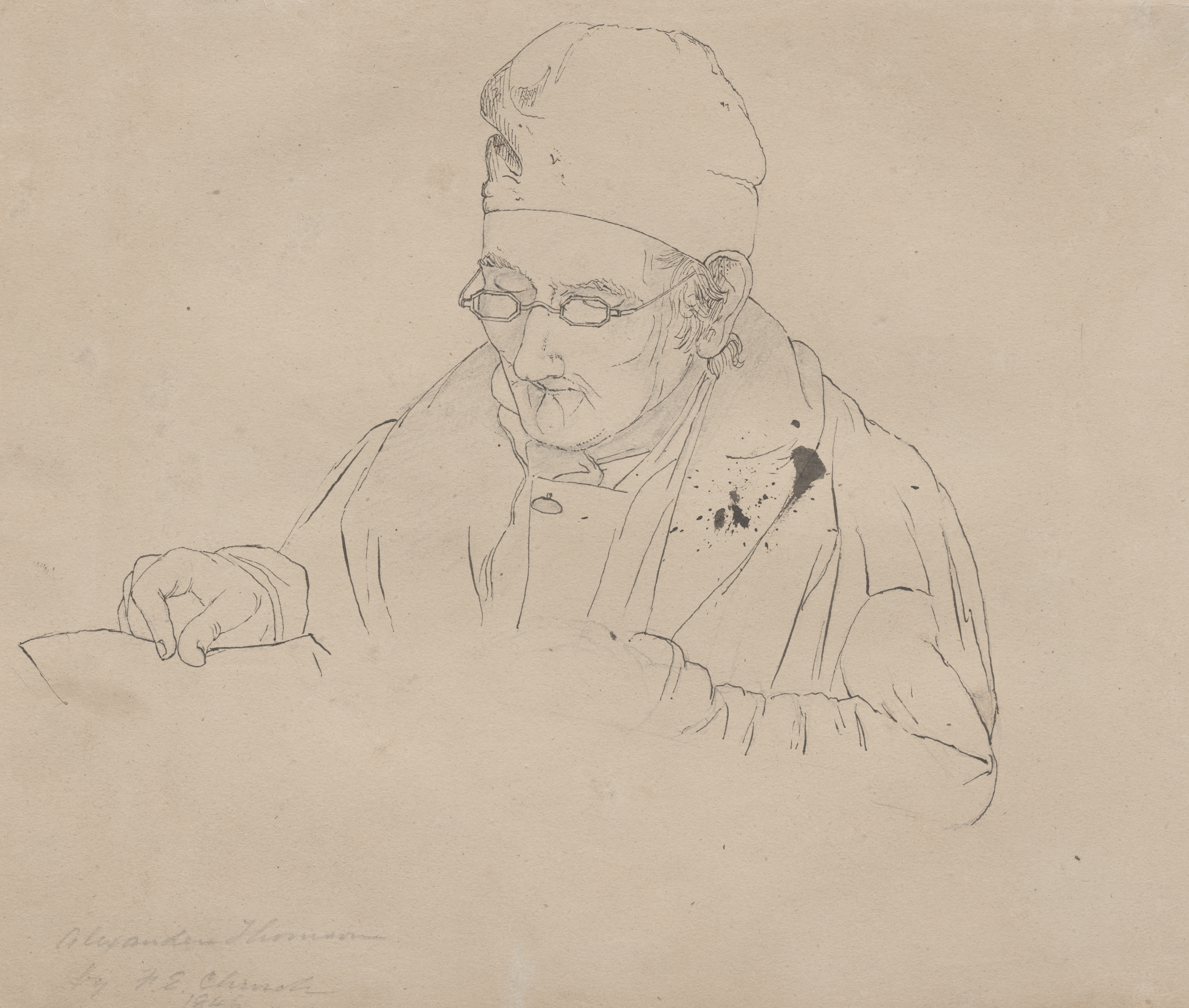
Alexander Thomson by Frederic Edwin Church, 1846, pencil and ink on paper, National Portrait Gallery

Thomson moved to Chambersberg where he purchased a mansion that was used as his residence, offices for his private practices, and a law school. His instruction consisted of oral instructions and examinations. His school became the law department of Marshall College.

== Personal life ==
Thomson was married on October 21, 1817 to Abigail Blythe of Bedford. After Abigal's death, he married Jane Graham, a daughter of General Graham of Stoystown. He had two daughters and five sons, one of whom was the railroad executive Frank Thomson.

He died in Chambersburg in 1848. Interment in Falling Spring Presbyterian Cemetery.

== Sources ==
U.S. House of Representatives
Preceded by John Tod	Member of the U.S. House of Representatives from Pennsylvania's 13th congressional district 1824–1826	Succeeded by Chauncey Forward
