= Henry Slicer =

American Methodist minister

- Slicer, c. 1866-1871
- Born: March 27, 1801; Annapolis, Maryland
- Died: April 23, 1874 (age 73)

Henry Slicer (March 27, 1801 – April 23, 1874) was an American Methodist minister who served as Chaplain of the Senate for three separate terms.

== Early years ==
Henry Slicer was born on March 27, 1801, in Annapolis, Maryland, the son of Andrew Slicer and Elizabeth Selby. During his youth he worked for a time as a painter of furniture while he studied for the ministry. He was licensed to preach in December 1821, by the Methodist church.

== Ministry ==
Slicer served pastorates at the Harford circuit (1821) and then the Redstone circuit (1823), west of the Allegheny Mountains. Then he was assigned to the Ebenezer Station in Washington, D.C., at the Naval Yard (1824). In 1837 he was elected to serve as Chaplain of the Senate, a post to which he would again be elected in 1847 and 1853.

The unfortunate duel on February 24, 1838, at the Bladensburg dueling grounds, between two Congressmen, Jonathan Cilley and William J. Graves, resulting in Cilley’s death, brought forth a sermon by Slicer that greatly influenced Congressional legislation banning dueling in the District of Columbia.

He served at Georgetown and went to Carlisle, Pennsylvania, in 1846. Following his third term as Senate Chaplain he served in Baltimore and in Frederick, Maryland. Slicer served as chaplain of the Seaman’s Chapel (1862–1870) in Baltimore. In 1870, he was appointed presiding elder of the Baltimore district. He died on April 23, 1874.

== Personal life ==
On April 3, 1827, in Baltimore, Slicer married Elizabeth (“Eliza”) C. Roberts. They had two daughters: Julia (b. 1836) and Sarah (b. 1847). Their three sons were George, Henry and Thomas Slicer.

Religious titles
Preceded by John Reinhard Goodman	32nd US Senate Chaplain; September 11, 1837 – December 31, 1839	Succeeded by George Grimston Cookman
Preceded by Septimus Tustin	35th US Senate Chaplain; December 16, 1846 – January 9, 1850	Succeeded by Clement Moore Butler
Preceded by Clement Moore Butler	37th US Senate Chaplain; December 7, 1853 – December 4, 1855	Succeeded by Henry Clay Dean
