= James McPherson Russell =

American politician

James McPherson Russell (November 10, 1786 – November 14, 1870) was a Whig member of the U.S. House of Representatives from Pennsylvania.

== Biography ==
James M. Russell (father of Samuel Lyon Russell) was born in York, Pennsylvania. He moved with his parents to a farm near Gettysburg, Pennsylvania. He attended the classical academy of James Ross in Chambersburg, Pennsylvania. He studied law, was admitted to the bar of Franklin County, Pennsylvania, in 1807 and to the Bedford County, Pennsylvania, bar in 1808 and commenced practice in Bedford.

He was the first burgess of Bedford Borough in the years 1818 and 1819 and a member of the State constitutional convention in 1837.

Russell was elected as a Whig to the Twenty-seventh Congress to fill the vacancy caused by the death of Henry Black. His opponent, according to the Daily Atlas, was "Mr. Philson of Somerset". He was not a candidate for renomination in 1842.

He resumed the practice of law, and served as trustee of the Bedford Academy and secretary of the Chambersburg & Bedford Turnpike Company. He died in Bedford in 1870. Interment in Bedford Cemetery.

== Sources ==
U.S. House of Representatives
Preceded by Henry Black	Member of the U.S. House of Representatives from Pennsylvania's 18th congressional district 1841–1843	Succeeded by Andrew Stewart
