= Job Mann =

American politician

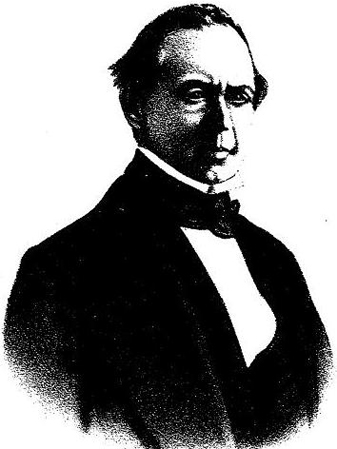
A picture of Job Mann

Job Mann (March 31, 1795 – October 8, 1873) was a Jacksonian and Democratic member of the U.S. House of Representatives from Pennsylvania.

Job Mann was born in Bethel Township, Pennsylvania. He attended the common schools and Bedford Academy. He served as clerk to the board of county commissioners in 1816. He was register, recorder, and clerk of Bedford County, Pennsylvania, from 1818 to 1835.

Mann was elected as a Jacksonian to the Twenty-fourth Congress. He was an unsuccessful candidate for reelection in 1836 to the Twenty-fifth Congress. He studied law, was admitted to the bar in 1839 and commenced practice in Bedford, Pennsylvania. He served as the 16th Treasurer of Pennsylvania from 1842 to 1845, and was a member of the Pennsylvania House of Representatives.

Mann was again elected as a Democrat to the Thirtieth and Thirty-first Congresses. He was not a candidate for renomination in 1850. He resumed the practice of law and died in Bedford in 1873. Interment in Bedford Cemetery.

The town of Manns Choice, Pennsylvania was named after him by default. In 1848, Congressman Mann pressured to have a post office at an unnamed village in Harrison Township. The Post Office Department approved the new post office, but as the village had no name Congressman Mann was to give it one. Before he did so, postal maps were made with the temporary designation "Mann's Choice" written on it. The name was never changed, and became the permanent and official one.

== Sources ==
- United States Congress. "Job Mann (id: M000106)". Biographical Directory of the United States Congress.
- The Political Graveyard

U.S. House of Representatives
Preceded by George Burd	Member of the U.S. House of Representatives from Pennsylvania's 18th congressional district 1835–1837	Succeeded by Charles Ogle
Preceded by Henry D. Foster	Member of the U.S. House of Representatives from Pennsylvania's 19th congressional district 1847–1851	Succeeded by Joseph H. Kuhns
Political offices
Preceded by John Gilmore	Treasurer of Pennsylvania; 1842–1848	Succeeded by James R. Snowden
