= Andrew Buchanan (American politician) =

American politician (1780–1848)

Member of the U.S. House of Representatives from Pennsylvania's 20th district
- In office March 4, 1835 – March 4, 1839
- Preceded by: Andrew Stewart
- Succeeded by: Enos Hook

Personal details
- Born: April 8, 1780 Chester County, Pennsylvania, U.S.
- Died: December 2, 1848 (aged 68) Waynesburg, Pennsylvania, U.S.
- Resting place: Green Mount Cemetery
- Party: Jacksonian
- Spouse: Rhoda Stephenson
- Children: 11
- Education: Dickinson College
- Occupation: Politician; lawyer

Andrew Buchanan (April 8, 1780 – December 2, 1848) was a member of the U.S. House of Representatives from Pennsylvania.

== Early life ==
Andrew Buchanan was born on April 8, 1780, in Chester County, Pennsylvania. He graduated from Dickinson College in Carlisle, Pennsylvania. He studied law and was admitted to the bar in 1798.

== Career ==
Buchanan commenced practice in York. He located in Waynesburg in 1803. He served as a member of the Pennsylvania House of Representatives and in the Pennsylvania Senate.

In 1834, Buchanan was elected as a Jacksonian to the Twenty-fourth Congress, defeating Andrew Stewart. He was elected as a Democrat to the Twenty-fifth Congress. He served as chairman of the United States House Committee on Elections during the Twenty-fifth Congress. He resumed the practice of his profession until his death.

== Personal life ==
Buchanan married Rhoda Stephenson of New Jersey. They had eleven children.

Buchanan died on December 2, 1848, in Waynesburg. He was interred in Waynesburg Commons and later re-interred in Green Mount Cemetery.

U.S. House of Representatives
Preceded by Andrew Stewart	Member of the U.S. House of Representatives from Pennsylvania's 20th congressional district 1835–1839	Succeeded by Enos Hook
