= George Burd =

American politician

Member of the U.S. House of Representatives from Pennsylvania
- In office March 4, 1831 – March 3, 1835
- Preceded by: Chauncey Forward
- Succeeded by: Job Mann
- Constituency: 13th district (1831–33); 18th district (1833–35)

Personal details
- Born: 1788 Pennsylvania, U.S.
- Died: January 13, 1844 (aged 55–56) Bedford, Pennsylvania, U.S.
- Party: Anti-Jacksonian

George Burd (1788 – January 13, 1844) was an Anti-Jacksonian member of the U.S. House of Representatives from Pennsylvania.

George Burd was born in Pennsylvania in 1788. He was admitted to the bar in 1810 at Carlisle, Pennsylvania, and practiced.

Burd was elected as an Anti-Jacksonian to the Twenty-second and Twenty-third Congresses. He moved to Mercer County, Pennsylvania, in 1843, and died in Bedford, Pennsylvania, in 1844. Interment in Bedford Cemetery.

== Sources ==
- United States Congress. "George Burd (id: B001073)". Biographical Directory of the United States Congress.
- The Political Graveyard

U.S. House of Representatives
Preceded by Chauncey Forward	Member of the U.S. House of Representatives from Pennsylvania's 13th congressional district 1831–1833	Succeeded by Jesse Miller
Preceded by John Banks	Member of the U.S. House of Representatives from Pennsylvania's 18th congressional district 1833–1835	Succeeded by Job Mann
