= George Grimston Cookman =

Methodist clergyman (1801–1841)

George Crimston Cookman

33rd Chaplain of the United States Senate
- In office December 31, 1839 – March 12, 1841
- President: Martin Van Buren; William Henry Harrison; John Tyler
- Preceded by: Henry Slicer
- Succeeded by: Septimus Tustin

Personal details
- Born: October 21, 1800 Kingston upon Hull, Yorkshire, England
- Died: March 12, 1841 (aged 40) North Atlantic Ocean
- Spouse: Mary Barton (m. 1827)
- Children: 6
- Parent(s): George Cookman; Mary Cookman
- Profession: Methodist clergyman

George Grimston Cookman (October 21, 1800 – March 12, 1841) was a Methodist clergyman who served as Chaplain of the Senate.

George Grimston Cookman was born in Kingston upon Hull, Yorkshire, England, on October 21, 1800, to George and Mary Cookman. He joined a Methodist society in 1820 and in 1821 he visited the United States for the first time, on business for his father. Later, upon the advice of minister friends, he determined to go to the United States to minister. He boarded the Orient on March 28, 1825, landing in Philadelphia, Pennsylvania, on Sunday, May 16, 1825. During his months at sea he read Bishop Watson's Apologies, Mason on Self-Knowledge, Jenyn's Views of the Internal Evidences of Christianity, Lord Lyttleton's Arguments for Christianity, Baxter's Gildas Salvianus and Saint's Rest, and Butler's Analogy, while proselytizing to the seamen on board.

== Ministry ==
His first year in the United States, he served St. George’s Church in Philadelphia. In 1826 he was appointed to the Kensington and St. John churches in Philadelphia. At this point in his life, he hoped to go as a missionary to Africa, but this did not happen. Following his marriage in the spring of 1827, he was appointed to the Lancaster, Pennsylvania, circuit (comprising Lancaster, Columbia and Reading), the Cookmans lived in Columbia, Pennsylvania, along the Susquehanna River, during this time. In 1828 he was stationed at New Brunswick, New Jersey, where his preaching drew much public acclaim.

In 1829 he was sent to the circuit in Talbot County, Maryland, where a long-held dream of preaching to the black population was first realized. His ministry and advocacy of emancipation garnered the praises of Frederick Douglass. His next appointments were to St. George’s in Philadelphia, for two years and then to Newark, New Jersey for a year. Cookman was then transferred to the Baltimore conference where he served all of the congregations in that city except Fells Point. Then he was called to Carlisle, Pennsylvania, just as the Methodists were revitalizing Dickinson College.

In 1838 he was sent to Wesley Chapel in Washington, D.C. His preaching there led to his being proposed as Chaplain of the Senate (1839). While serving there, he was able to bring about a renewed commitment to Christian faith in future President Franklin Pierce. In 1840 he took charge of the Alexandria, Virginia, church.

Rev. Cookman was lost at sea when the steamship SS President (then the largest passenger ship afloat) departed on her third and final westward crossing on March 11, 1841, to England, never to be heard from again. The liner was last seen from the Packet Ship ‘’Orpheus’’ in a terrific gale on March 12; all 136 of the crew and passengers perished.

== See also ==
- List of people who disappeared mysteriously at sea

== Personal life ==
On April 2, 1827, Cookman, who had returned to England, married Mary Barton at Doncaster, Yorkshire; their six children included sons Alfred, George, and John Emory.

Religious titles
Preceded by Henry Slicer	33rd US Senate Chaplain; December 31, 1839 – June 12, 1841	Succeeded by Septimus Tustin
