= Andrew J. Ogle =

American politician (1822–1852)

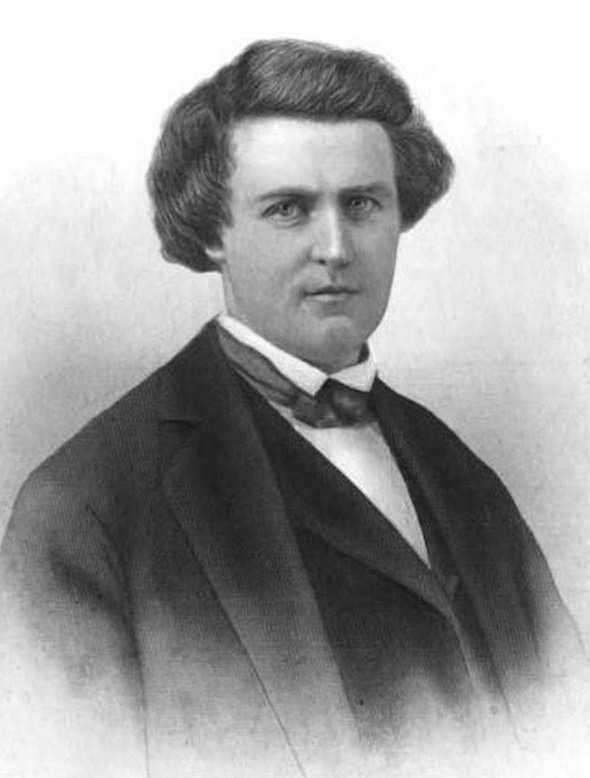
From Volume II of 1903's The Twentieth Century Bench and Bar of Pennsylvania

Andrew Jackson Ogle (March 25, 1822 – October 14, 1852) was a Whig member of the U.S. House of Representatives from Pennsylvania.

Andrew J. Ogle (son of Alexander Ogle, Jr., grandson of Alexander Ogle, and nephew of Charles Ogle) was born in Somerset, Pennsylvania, in 1822. He attended Jefferson College in Canonsburg, Pennsylvania. He studied law, was admitted to the bar in 1843 and commenced practice in Somerset. He served as prothonotary of Somerset County, Pennsylvania, in 1845.

Ogle was elected as a Whig to the Thirty-first Congress. He was an unsuccessful candidate for reelection in 1850. He was appointed United States Chargé d'Affaires to Denmark on January 22, 1852, but did not assume his duties at that post. He died in Somerset in 1852. Interment in Union Cemetery.

== Sources ==
- United States Congress. "Andrew J. Ogle (id: O000046)". Biographical Directory of the United States Congress.
- The Political Graveyard

U.S. House of Representatives
Preceded by Andrew Stewart	Member of the U.S. House of Representatives from Pennsylvania's 18th congressional district 1849–1851	Succeeded by John L. Dawson
Political offices
Preceded by Walter Forward	U.S. Ambassador to Denmark; 1851; Appointed as Chargé d'Affaires	Succeeded by Miller Grieve
