= Charles Ogle (politician) =

American politician (1798–1841)

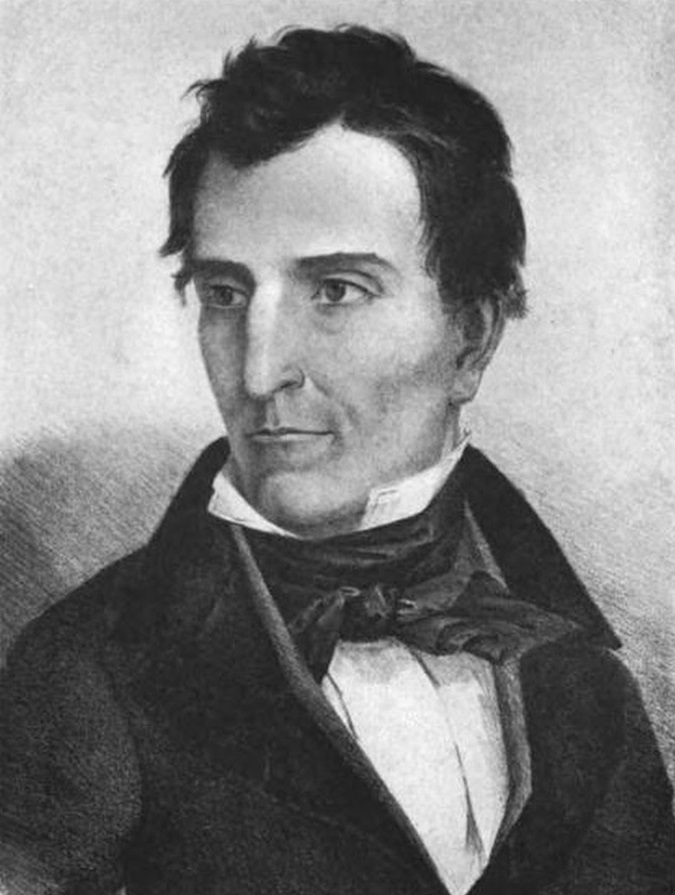
- From Volume II of 1903's The Twentieth Century Bench and Bar of Pennsylvania

Member of the U.S. House of Representatives from Pennsylvania's 18th district
- In office March 4, 1837 – May 10, 1841
- Preceded by: Job Mann
- Succeeded by: Henry Black

Personal details
- Born: 1798 Somerset, Pennsylvania, U.S.
- Died: May 10, 1841 (aged 42–43) Somerset, Pennsylvania, U.S.
- Resting place: Union Cemetery; 40°0′40″N 79°4′49″W
- Party: Anti-Masonic, Whig
- Spouse: eldest daughter of James Postlethwaite
- Relations: Alexander Ogle (father), Andrew Jackson Ogle (nephew)
- Education: Washington College
- Occupation: solicitor, jurist, representative
- Profession: lawyer
- Committees: United States House Committee on Roads and Canals 4 March 1839 - 3 March 1841 (26th Congress)

Charles Ogle (1798 – May 10, 1841) was an American attorney and politician who served as an Anti-Masonic and Whig member of the United States House of Representatives from Pennsylvania.

== Biography ==
The second son of Alexander Ogle and uncle of Andrew Jackson Ogle, Charles Ogle was born in Somerset, Pennsylvania, in 1798. He studied law, was admitted to the bar in 1822 and commenced practice in Somerset. He served on the Common Pleas Bench for Lancaster County. He graduated from Washington College (now Washington & Jefferson College) in 1817.

=== Political career ===
Ogle was elected as an Anti-Masonic candidate to the Twenty-fifth and Twenty-sixth Congresses. He was reelected as a Whig to the Twenty-seventh Congress and served until his death in Somerset in 1841. His "Gold Spoon Oration" (1840) mocked the supposed grandeur of President Martin Van Buren, contributing to the latter's loss to William Henry Harrison later that year.

He served as chairman of the United States House Committee on Roads and Canals during the Twenty-sixth Congress, but died in office of tuberculosis on 10 May 1841 in his home in Somerset, Pennsylvania. He was buried in Union Cemetery in his hometown.

== See also ==
- List of members of the United States Congress who died in office (1790–1899)

== Sources ==
U.S. House of Representatives
Preceded by Job Mann	Member of the U.S. House of Representatives from Pennsylvania's 18th congressional district 1837–1841	Succeeded by Henry Black
