= Alexander Ogle =

American politician (1766–1832)

Alexander Ogle (August 10, 1766 – October 14, 1832) was an American politician who served as a Jackson Democrat member of the U.S. House of Representatives for Pennsylvania's 8th congressional district from 1817 to 1819.

== Early life ==
Ogle was born August 10, 1766, in Frederick, Maryland. In 1795, he moved to Somerset, Pennsylvania. He is the father of Charles Ogle and grandfather of Andrew Jackson Ogle

== Career ==
He served as a member of the Pennsylvania House of Representatives in 1803, 1804, 1807, 1808, and 1811. During the war of 1812, he served as major general in the Pennsylvania militia, commanding the 12th division, comprising recruits from Somerset, Bedford and Cambria counties. He worked as prothonotary, recorder of deeds, and clerk of courts from 1812 to 1817. He owned slaves.

Ogle was elected as a Democratic-Republican to the Fifteenth Congress. He was not a candidate for renomination in 1818. He served again as a member of the Pennsylvania House of Representatives from 1819 to 1823, and served as a member of the Pennsylvania State Senate for the 22nd district in 1827 and 1828. He died in Somerset in 1832.

== Sources ==
- United States Congress. "Alexander Ogle (id: O000045)". Biographical Directory of the United States Congress.
- The Political Graveyard

Pennsylvania House of Representatives
Preceded by	Member of the Pennsylvania House of Representatives; 1803-1804, 1807-1808, 1811, 1819-1823	Succeeded by
U.S. House of Representatives
Preceded by William Piper	Member of the U.S. House of Representatives from Pennsylvania's 8th congressional district 1817–1819	Succeeded by Robert Philson
Pennsylvania State Senate
Preceded by Chauncey Forward	Member of the Pennsylvania Senate, 22nd district 1827-1828	Succeeded by Henry Humbert Fore
