= Septimus Tustin =

Chaplain of the US House and Senate (died 1871)

Septimus Tustin (c. 1796 – October 28, 1871) was a Presbyterian clergyman who served as Chaplain of the United States House of Representatives in 1837 and as Chaplain of the United States Senate 1841–1846.

== Early life ==
Tustin was born in Philadelphia, Pennsylvania, the son of Septimus and Elizabeth Paul Tustin. His father died when he was quite young, and having been raised by his mother, he was greatly influenced by her piety and her involvement in the First Presbyterian Church in the Northern Liberties of Philadelphia.

He was educated at the University of Pennsylvania and the Seminary of the Associate Reformed Church.

Following service as a licensed preacher, in Washington, D.C., and in Philadelphia, Tustin was ordained on October 7, 1824, in First Presbyterian Church, Washington, D.C. This was the first ordination performed by the newly constituted Presbytery of the District of Columbia.

== Ordained ministry ==
Following his ordination, Tustin was called to be pastor of the Leesburg, Virginia, Presbyterian Church in 1825–1826. According to church historians at the Leesburg Presbyterian Church, Reverend Septimus Tustin was described by one church historian as "a promising young man" but "during his ministration (on account of some internal dissensions) the church lost several of its most valuable members and did not recover from the evil effects for several years."

Following Leesburg, Tustin was called to be pastor of the Presbyterian Church in Charlestown, Virginia (now West Virginia). Then, he served as Chaplain of the University of Virginia, in Charlottesville, after which he served as pastor of First Presbyterian Church Warrenton, Virginia."

== Chaplain of the House – Chaplain of the Senate ==
While at Warrenton, he was elected to serve as chaplain of the United States House of Representatives. This necessitated his taking a year’s leave of absence from his congregation, and when invited to serve a second years’ term by the House, his congregation declined to permit his continuing leave.

As a result of a vacancy in the post of Chaplain of the Senate, Tustin was invited to serve; a post he then held from 1841 to 1846. In order to accept, he also became associate pastor of the F Street Presbyterian Church, Washington, D.C., an antecedent of the New York Avenue Presbyterian Church, during the pastorate of James Laurie (pastor 1803–1853). The two pastors alternated preaching responsibilities at the church; on the Sundays he was not at F Street, Tustin preached at the Senate. Tustin was one of fourteen Presbyterian ministers to serve as Chaplain of the Senate, to date.

== Additional service ==
Following his time in Washington, Tustin served the Presbyterian Church in Hagerstown, Maryland and First Presbyterian Church of Germantown, Pennsylvania, near Philadelphia (October, 1850, to June, 1852). He thereafter was pastor at Havre de Grace, Maryland, following which he served the Presbyterian church in Aberdeen, Mississippi, a position he resigned upon the secession of Mississippi from the Union at the outbreak of the American Civil War. Thereafter he served in an appointed government position in Washington, D.C., until the time of his death, as well as stated supply pastor of the Fifteenth Street Colored Presbyterian Church.

Tustin served as a trustee of Lafayette College. He also worked hard to effect a reunion of the Presbyterian denominations.

== Personal life ==
Tustin was married to Eliza Maria Balch (born 1802), daughter of Rev. Stephen Bloomer Balch, in her father's church in Georgetown, during his pastorate in Leesburg. They were the parents of James P. Tustin who became a lawyer in Washington, D.C. Some of Rev. Tustin's letters may be found among the papers of President John Tyler. The Rev. Dr. Tustin died on October 28, 1871.

Religious titles
Preceded by Oliver C. Comstock	27th US House Chaplain; September 12, 1837 – December 11, 1837	Succeeded by Levi R. Reese
Preceded by George Grimston Cookman	34th US Senate Chaplain; June 12, 1841 – December 16, 1846	Succeeded by Henry Slicer
