= 1840–41 United States House of Representatives elections =

House elections for the 27th U.S. Congress

- July 6, 1840 – November 2, 1841

All 242 seats in the United States House of Representatives 122 seats needed for a majority
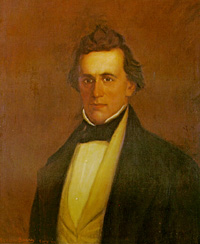

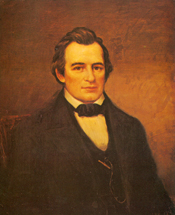
| | Majority party | Minority party |
|---|---|---|
| Leader | John White | John Jones |
| Party | Whig | Democratic |
| Leader's seat | Kentucky 9th | Virginia 3rd |
| Last election | 109 seats | 125 seats |
| Seats won | 142 | 98 |
| Seat change | ▲33 | ▼27 |
| Popular vote | 1,081,191 | 1,002,582 |
| Percentage | 51.38% | 47.64% |
| Swing | ▲3.62 pp | ▼2.40 pp |
| | Third party |
| Party | Independent |
| Last election | 0 seats |
| Seats won | 2 (Note: Includes one Independent from Virginia, and one Independent Democrat from Illinois.) |
| Seat change | ▲2 |
| Popular vote | 10,001 |
| Percentage | 0.48% |
| Swing | ▲0.34 pp |
- Results: Democratic hold Democratic gain Whig hold Whig gain Independent gain Independent Democrat gain
Speaker before election
Robert M. T. Hunter
Whig
Elected Speaker
John White
Whig

The 1840–41 United States House of Representatives elections were held on various dates in various states between July 6, 1840, and November 2, 1841. Each state set its own date for its elections to the House of Representatives, before or after the first session of the 27th United States Congress convened on May 31, 1841. Elections were held for all 242 seats, representing 26 states.

In a Whig wave, voters gave the Whig Party a House majority for the first time. Most Americans experienced the Panic of 1837 as a severe economic downturn. Its perceived mishandling by Democratic President Martin Van Buren fueled new support for alternative economic policies favored by Whigs. These were policies which were previously viewed with skepticism by the voters. Collapse of the Anti-Masonic Party in the late 1830s also drove some third-party incumbents into the Whig Party. Newly elected members included Robert M. T. Hunter, Independent of Virginia, and Zadok Casey, Independent Democrat of Illinois.

== Election summaries ==
↓ Chart showing seating arrangement
98
Democratic
2
(Note: There was 1 Independent and 1 Independent Democrat.)
142
Whig

| State | Type | Date | Total seats | Democratic | | Whig | |
| State | Type | Date | Total seats | Seats | Change | Seats | Change |
|---|---|---|---|---|---|---|---|
| Louisiana | Districts | July 6–8, 1840 | 3 | 1 | ▲1 | 2 | ▼1 |
| Missouri | At-large | August 3, 1840 | 2 | 2 | Steady | 0 | Steady |
| Illinois | Districts | August 7, 1840 | 3 | 2 (Note: Including one Independent Democrat elected to Illinois's 2nd congressional district.) | Steady | 1 | Steady |
| Vermont | Districts | September 4, 1840 | 5 | 0 | ▼2 | 5 | ▲2 |
| Maine | Districts | September 14, 1840 | 8 | 4 | ▼2 | 4 | ▲2 |
| Arkansas | At-large | October 5, 1840 | 1 | 1 | Steady | 0 | Steady |
| Georgia | At-large | October 6, 1840 | 9 | 0 | Steady | 9 | Steady |
| South Carolina | Districts | October 12–13, 1840 | 9 | 8 | Steady | 1 | Steady |
| Ohio | Districts | October 13, 1840 | 19 | 7 | ▼4 | 12 | ▲4 |
| Pennsylvania | District (25 (Note: Includes 3 plural districts)) | October 13, 1840 | 28 | 15 | ▼2 | 13 | ▲8 |
| New York | District (33 (Note: Includes 5 plural districts)) | November 2–4, 1840 | 40 | 21 | ▲2 | 19 | ▼2 |
| Connecticut | Districts | November 3, 1840 | 6 | 0 | Steady | 6 | Steady |
| Michigan | At-large | November 3, 1840 | 1 | 0 | ▼1 | 1 | ▲1 |
| New Jersey | At-large | November 3, 1840 | 6 | 0 | ▼5 | 6 | ▲5 |
| Massachusetts | Districts | November 9, 1840 | 12 | 1 | ▼1 | 11 | ▲1 |
| Delaware | At-large | November 10, 1840 | 1 | 0 | ▼1 | 1 | ▲1 |
1841 elections
| New Hampshire | At-large | March 9, 1841 | 5 | 5 | Steady | 0 | Steady |
| Rhode Island | At-large | April 21, 1841 | 2 | 0 | Steady | 2 | Steady |
| Virginia (Note: Robert M. T. Hunter was elected as an independent in Virginia's 9th congressional district, and so is not included in the figures here. Hunter had previously run in earlier elections as a Whig.) | Districts | April 23, 1841 | 21 | 10 | ▼2 | 10 | ▲3 |
| Kentucky | Districts | April 26, 1841 | 13 | 2 | Steady | 11 | Steady |
| Indiana | Districts | May 3, 1841 | 7 | 1 | ▼4 | 6 | ▲4 |
| Tennessee | Districts | May 6, 1841 | 13 | 5 | ▼1 | 8 | ▲1 |
| North Carolina | Districts | May 13, 1841 | 13 | 5 | ▼3 | 8 | ▲3 |
| Maryland | District (7 (Note: Includes 1 plural district)) | May 17, 1841 | 8 | 2 | ▼3 | 6 | ▲3 |
| Alabama | At-large (Note: Changed from district) | May 20, 1841 | 5 | 5 | ▲2 | 0 | ▼2 |
| Mississippi | At-large | November 1–2, 1841 | 2 | 2 | Steady | 0 | Steady |
| Total | | | 242 | 99; 40.9% | ▼26 | 142; 59.5% | ▲33 |

Popular vote
| Whig | 51.04% |
| Democratic | 47.83% |
| Others | 1.13% |

House seats
| Whig | 58.68% |
| Democratic | 40.50% |
| Independent | 0.83% |

The previous election had two minor parties, the Anti-Masonic Party with 6 seats and the Conservative Party (of Virginia) with 2 seats, both of which disappeared in this election.

The 1st session of the 27th Congress began May 31, 1841, before Mississippi had elected Representatives, leaving that State unrepresented until the 2nd session.

== Special elections ==
=== 26th Congress ===
| District | Incumbent | | | This race | |
| District | Member | Party | First elected | Results | Candidates |
|---|---|---|---|---|---|
| Virginia 14 | Charles F. Mercer | Whig | 1817 | Incumbent resigned December 26, 1839. New member elected January 15, 1840. Whig hold. Winner was not a candidate for the next term; see below. | ▌ ✓ William M. McCarty (Whig) 58.9%; ▌Cuthbert Powell (Democratic) 41.1% |
| Indiana 7 | Tilghman Howard | Democratic | 1839 | Incumbent resigned August 1, 1840. New member elected August 3, 1840. Whig gain. Winner later re-elected to the next term; see below. | ▌ ✓ Henry S. Lane (Whig) 53.1%; ▌Edward A. Hannegan (Democratic) 46.9% |
| Ohio 4 | Thomas Corwin | Whig | 1830 | Incumbent resigned May 30, 1840, to successfully run for Governor of Ohio. New member elected October 13, 1840. Whig hold. Winner also elected the same day to the next term; see below. | ▌ ✓ Jeremiah Morrow (Whig); ▌Benjamin Baldwin (Democratic); [data missing] |
| Pennsylvania 22 | Richard Biddle | Anti-Masonic | 1836 | Incumbent resigned May 13, 1840. New member elected October 13, 1840. Whig gain. Winner not elected the same day to the next term; see below. | ▌ ✓ Henry M. Brackenridge (Whig) 61.5%; ▌William Wilkins (Democratic) 38.5% |
| Kentucky 5 | Simeon H. Anderson | Whig | 1839 | Incumbent died August 11, 1840. New member elected October 19–21, 1840. Whig hold. Winner later re-elected to the next term; see below. | ▌ ✓ John B. Thompson (Whig); [data missing] |
| New York 11 | Anson Brown | Whig | 1838 | Incumbent died June 14, 1840. New member elected November 2–4, 1840. Whig hold. Winner not elected the same day to the next term; see below. | ▌ ✓ Nicholas B. Doe (Whig) 52.1%; ▌Giles F. Yates (Democratic) 47.9% |
| Connecticut 2 | William L. Storrs | Whig | 1829; 1833 (retired); 1839 | Incumbent resigned June 1840 to become associate justice of the Connecticut Supreme Court of Errors. New member elected November 3, 1840. Whig hold. Incumbent later re-elected to the next term; see below. | ▌ ✓ William W. Boardman (Whig) 53.7%; ▌Charles A. Ingersoll (Democratic) 46.3% |
| Louisiana 3 | Rice Garland | Whig | 1834 (special) | Incumbent resigned July 21, 1840, to become associate justice of the Louisiana Supreme Court. New member elected November 7, 1840. Whig hold. Winner had already been elected to the next term; see below. | ▌ ✓ John Moore (Whig) 65.9%; ▌J. H. Overton (Democratic) 34.1% |
| Massachusetts 1 | Abbott Lawrence | Whig | 1834; 1836 (retired); 1839 (special) | Incumbent resigned September 18, 1840. New member elected November 9, 1840. Whig hold. Winner also elected the same day to the next term; see below. | ▌ ✓ Robert C. Winthrop (Whig) 63.2%; ▌Bradford Sumner (Democratic) 36.8% |
| Pennsylvania 13 | William S. Ramsey | Democratic | 1838 | Incumbent died October 17, 1840. New member elected November 20, 1840. Democratic hold. Winner had not been a candidate for the next term; see below. | ▌ ✓ Charles McClure (Democratic) 94.7%; Scattering 5.3% |
| Virginia 1 | Joel Holleman | Democratic | 1839 | Incumbent resigned December 1, 1840. New member elected December 28, 1840. Whig gain. Winner later re-elected to the next term; see below. | ▌ ✓ Francis Mallory (Whig); ▌W. Collins (Democratic); [data missing] |
| Georgia at-large (One of the at-large seats) | Walter T. Colquitt | Whig | 1838 | Incumbent resigned July 21, 1840. New member elected January 4, 1841. Whig hold. Winner had not been a candidate for the next term; see below. | ▌ ✓ Hines Holt (Whig) 55.2%; ▌John H. Watson (Democratic) 44.8% |

=== 27th Congress ===
| District | Incumbent | | | This race | |
| District | Member | Party | First elected | Results | Candidates |
|---|---|---|---|---|---|
| Maine 4 | George Evans | Whig | 1829 (special) | Incumbent resigned March 4, 1841, when elected U.S. Senator. New member elected March 14, 1841. Whig hold. | ▌ ✓ David Bronson (Whig) 62.9%; ▌John Hubbard (Democratic) 32.1%; ▌Ebenezer Childs (Liberty) 5.0% |
| Massachusetts 5 | Levi Lincoln | Whig | 1834 (special) | Incumbent resigned March 16, 1841, to become Collector of the Port of Boston. New member elected May 3, 1841. Whig hold. | ▌ ✓ Charles Hudson (Whig) 59.4%; ▌Isaac Davis (Democratic) 34.2%; ▌Cyrus P. Grosvenor (Unknown) 6.4% |
| Pennsylvania 13 | William S. Ramsey | Democratic | 1838 | Incumbent died October 17, 1840. New member elected May 4, 1841. Democratic hold. | ▌ ✓ Amos Gustine (Democratic) 93.9%; Scattering 6.1% |
| New York 26 | Francis Granger | Whig | 1834; 1836 (retired); 1838 | Incumbent resigned March 5, 1841, to become U.S. Postmaster General. New member elected May 11–13, 1841. Whig hold. | ▌ ✓ John Greig (Whig) 53.4%; ▌Bowen Whiting (Democratic) 43.30%; ▌Hiram Pitts (Liberty) 3.3% |
| Pennsylvania 20 | Enos Hook | Democratic | 1838 | Incumbent resigned April 18, 1841. New member elected May 25, 1841. Democratic hold. | ▌ ✓ Henry W. Beeson (Democratic) 56.5%; ▌Andrew Stewart (Whig) 43.5% |
| Pennsylvania 18 | Charles Ogle | Whig | 1836 | Incumbent died May 10, 1841. New member elected June 8, 1841. Whig hold. | ▌ ✓ Henry Black (Whig) 68.1%; ▌William Philson (Democratic) 31.9% |
| Pennsylvania 2 (One of two seats) | John Sergeant | Whig | 1815 (special); 1822 (retired); 1827 (special); 1828 (lost); 1836 | Incumbent resigned September 15, 1841. New member elected October 2, 1841. Whig hold. | ▌ ✓ Joseph R. Ingersoll (Whig) 55.3%; ▌Thomas Petit (Democratic) 43.7%; ▌Samuel Webb (Liberty) 1.0% |
| New York 26 | John Greig | Whig | 1841 (special) | Incumbent resigned September 25, 1841. New member elected November 1–3, 1841. Whig hold. | ▌ ✓ Francis Granger (Whig) 50.9%; ▌Bowen Whiting (Democratic) 45.1%; ▌Hiram Pitts (Liberty) 4.0% |
| Virginia 13 | Linn Banks | Democratic | 1838 (special) | Incumbent resigned November 8, 1841, in the middle of an election contest initiated by William Smith. New member elected November 30, 1841. Democratic hold. | ▌ ✓ William Smith (Democratic) 43.7%; ▌Daniel F. Slaughter (Whig) 31.5%; ▌Linn Banks (Democratic) 24.8% |
| Georgia at-large (Three of the at-large seats) | William C. Dawson | Whig | 1836 (special) | Incumbent resigned November 13, 1841, after losing his run for Governor of Georgia. New member elected December 21, 1841. Democratic gain. | Elected on a general ticket: ▌ ✓ Mark A. Cooper (Democratic) 17.2%; ▌ ✓ Walter T. Colquitt (Democratic) 17.1%; ▌ ✓ Edward J. Black (Democratic) 17.0%; ▌Charles Dougherty (Whig) 16.3%; ▌George R. Gilmer (Whig) 16.2%; ▌Augustus R. Wright (Whig) 16.1% |
| Georgia at-large (Three of the at-large seats) | E. A. Nisbet | Whig | 1838 | Incumbent resigned October 12, 1841. New member elected December 21, 1841. Democratic gain. | Elected on a general ticket: ▌ ✓ Mark A. Cooper (Democratic) 17.2%; ▌ ✓ Walter T. Colquitt (Democratic) 17.1%; ▌ ✓ Edward J. Black (Democratic) 17.0%; ▌Charles Dougherty (Whig) 16.3%; ▌George R. Gilmer (Whig) 16.2%; ▌Augustus R. Wright (Whig) 16.1% |
| Georgia at-large (Three of the at-large seats) | Julius C. Alford | Whig | 1837 (special); 1837 (term expired); 1838 | Incumbent resigned October 1, 1841. New member elected December 21, 1841. Democratic gain. | Elected on a general ticket: ▌ ✓ Mark A. Cooper (Democratic) 17.2%; ▌ ✓ Walter T. Colquitt (Democratic) 17.1%; ▌ ✓ Edward J. Black (Democratic) 17.0%; ▌Charles Dougherty (Whig) 16.3%; ▌George R. Gilmer (Whig) 16.2%; ▌Augustus R. Wright (Whig) 16.1% |
| Pennsylvania 18 | Henry Black | Whig | 1841 (special) | Incumbent died November 28, 1841. New member elected December 21, 1841. Whig hold. | ▌ ✓ James M. Russell (Whig) 50.0%; ▌William Philson (Democratic) 48.6%; ▌George Ross (Unknown) 1.4% |

== Alabama ==
The election was held May 20, 1841, after the March 4, 1841 beginning of the term, but before the House first convened on May 31, 1841.

| District | Incumbent | | | This race | |
| District | Member | Party | First elected | Results | Candidates |
|---|---|---|---|---|---|
| Alabama at-large 5 seats on a general ticket | Reuben Chapman; Redistricted from the 1st district | Democratic | 1835 | Incumbent re-elected. | ▌ ✓ Reuben Chapman (Democratic) 11.5%; ▌ ✓ Benjamin G. Shields (Democratic) 11.5%; ▌ ✓ Dixon H. Lewis (Democratic) 11.4%; ▌ ✓ William W. Payne (Democratic) 11.4%; ▌ ✓ George S. Houston (Democratic) 11.3%; ▌Henry W. Hilliard (Whig) 8.6%; ▌James T. Rather (Whig) 8.6%; ▌John M. Lewis (Whig) 8.6%; ▌George W. Crabb (Whig) 8.5%; ▌John Burke (Whig) 8.3%; ▌William D. Dunn (Whig) 0.3% |
| Alabama at-large 5 seats on a general ticket | David Hubbard; Redistricted from the 2nd district | Democratic | 1839 | Incumbent retired. Democratic hold. | ▌ ✓ Reuben Chapman (Democratic) 11.5%; ▌ ✓ Benjamin G. Shields (Democratic) 11.5%; ▌ ✓ Dixon H. Lewis (Democratic) 11.4%; ▌ ✓ William W. Payne (Democratic) 11.4%; ▌ ✓ George S. Houston (Democratic) 11.3%; ▌Henry W. Hilliard (Whig) 8.6%; ▌James T. Rather (Whig) 8.6%; ▌John M. Lewis (Whig) 8.6%; ▌George W. Crabb (Whig) 8.5%; ▌John Burke (Whig) 8.3%; ▌William D. Dunn (Whig) 0.3% |
| Alabama at-large 5 seats on a general ticket | George W. Crabb; Redistricted from the 3rd district | Whig | 1838 (special) | Incumbent lost re-election. Democratic gain. | ▌ ✓ Reuben Chapman (Democratic) 11.5%; ▌ ✓ Benjamin G. Shields (Democratic) 11.5%; ▌ ✓ Dixon H. Lewis (Democratic) 11.4%; ▌ ✓ William W. Payne (Democratic) 11.4%; ▌ ✓ George S. Houston (Democratic) 11.3%; ▌Henry W. Hilliard (Whig) 8.6%; ▌James T. Rather (Whig) 8.6%; ▌John M. Lewis (Whig) 8.6%; ▌George W. Crabb (Whig) 8.5%; ▌John Burke (Whig) 8.3%; ▌William D. Dunn (Whig) 0.3% |
| Alabama at-large 5 seats on a general ticket | Dixon H. Lewis; Redistricted from the 4th district | Democratic | 1829 | Incumbent re-elected. | ▌ ✓ Reuben Chapman (Democratic) 11.5%; ▌ ✓ Benjamin G. Shields (Democratic) 11.5%; ▌ ✓ Dixon H. Lewis (Democratic) 11.4%; ▌ ✓ William W. Payne (Democratic) 11.4%; ▌ ✓ George S. Houston (Democratic) 11.3%; ▌Henry W. Hilliard (Whig) 8.6%; ▌James T. Rather (Whig) 8.6%; ▌John M. Lewis (Whig) 8.6%; ▌George W. Crabb (Whig) 8.5%; ▌John Burke (Whig) 8.3%; ▌William D. Dunn (Whig) 0.3% |
| Alabama at-large 5 seats on a general ticket | James Dellet; Redistricted from the 5th district | Whig | 1839 | Incumbent retired. Democratic gain. | ▌ ✓ Reuben Chapman (Democratic) 11.5%; ▌ ✓ Benjamin G. Shields (Democratic) 11.5%; ▌ ✓ Dixon H. Lewis (Democratic) 11.4%; ▌ ✓ William W. Payne (Democratic) 11.4%; ▌ ✓ George S. Houston (Democratic) 11.3%; ▌Henry W. Hilliard (Whig) 8.6%; ▌James T. Rather (Whig) 8.6%; ▌John M. Lewis (Whig) 8.6%; ▌George W. Crabb (Whig) 8.5%; ▌John Burke (Whig) 8.3%; ▌William D. Dunn (Whig) 0.3% |

== Arkansas ==
1840 Arkansas at-large election
- October 5, 1840

| Nominee | Edward Cross | Absalom Fowler |
| Party | Democratic | Whig |
| Popular vote | 7.876 | 5,788 |
| Percentage | 57.6% | 42.4% |
- County Results; Cross: 50–60% 60–70% 70–80% 80–90% >90% Fowler: 50–60% 60–70% 70–80% 80–90%
U.S. Representative before election
Edward Cross
Democratic
Elected U.S. Representative
Edward Cross
Democratic

The election was held October 5, 1840.

| District | Incumbent | | | This race | |
| District | Member | Party | First elected | Results | Candidates |
|---|---|---|---|---|---|
| Arkansas at-large | Edward Cross | Democratic | 1838 | Incumbent re-elected. | ▌ ✓ Edward Cross (Democratic) 57.6%; ▌Absalom Fowler (Whig) 42.4% |

== Connecticut ==
Elections were held April 5, 1841, after the March 4, 1841 beginning of the term, but before the House first convened on May 31, 1841.

| District | Incumbent | | | This race | |
| District | Member | Party | First elected | Results | Candidates |
|---|---|---|---|---|---|
| Connecticut 1 | Joseph Trumbull | Whig | 1834 (special); 1835 (lost); 1839 | Incumbent re-elected. | ▌ ✓ Joseph Trumbull (Whig) 57.1%; ▌Thomas H. Seymour (Democratic) 42.9% |
| Connecticut 2 | William W. Boardman | Whig | 1840 (special) | Incumbent re-elected. | ▌ ✓ William W. Boardman (Whig) 54.3%; ▌Charles A. Ingersoll (Democratic) 45.7% |
| Connecticut 3 | Thomas W. Williams | Whig | 1839 | Incumbent re-elected. | ▌ ✓ Thomas W. Williams (Whig) 55.7%; ▌Erastus Coit (Democratic) 44.3% |
| Connecticut 4 | Thomas B. Osborne | Whig | 1839 | Incumbent re-elected. | ▌ ✓ Thomas B. Osborne (Whig) 55.6%; ▌William Pomeroy (Democratic) 44.4% |
| Connecticut 5 | Truman Smith | Whig | 1839 | Incumbent re-elected. | ▌ ✓ Truman Smith (Whig) 55.9%; ▌John C. Smith (Democratic) 44.1% |
| Connecticut 6 | John H. Brockway | Whig | 1839 | Incumbent re-elected. | ▌ ✓ John H. Brockway (Whig) 57.3%; ▌Chauncey F. Cleveland (Democratic) 42.7% |

== Delaware ==
The election was held November 10, 1840.

| District | Incumbent | | | This race | |
| District | Member | Party | First elected | Results | Candidates |
|---|---|---|---|---|---|
| Delaware at-large | Thomas Robinson Jr. | Democratic | 1838 | Incumbent lost re-election. Whig gain. | ▌ ✓ George B. Rodney (Whig) 54.2%; ▌Thomas Robinson Jr. (Democratic) 45.8% |

== Florida Territory ==
See Non-voting delegates, below.

== Georgia ==
The election was held October 6, 1840.

| District | Incumbent | | | This race | |
| District | Member | Party | First elected | Results | Candidates |
|---|---|---|---|---|---|
| Georgia at-large 9 seats on a general ticket | William C. Dawson | Whig | 1836 (special) | Incumbent re-elected. Incumbent then resigned November 13, 1841, leading to a special election; see above. | ▌ ✓ William C. Dawson (Whig) 17.7%; ▌ ✓ E. A. Nisbet (Whig) 17.6%; ▌ ✓ Richard W. Habersham (Whig) 17.6%; ▌ ✓ Thomas F. Foster (Whig) 17.5%; ▌ ✓ Lott Warren (Whig) 17.5%; ▌ ✓ Julius C. Alford (Whig) 17.5%; ▌ ✓ T. Butler King (Whig) 17.5%; ▌ ✓ Roger L. Gamble (Whig) 17.5%; ▌ ✓ James A. Meriwether (Whig) 17.5%; ▌Walter T. Colquitt (Democratic) 15.9%; ▌Mark A. Cooper (Democratic) 15.9%; ▌Edward J. Black (Democratic) 15.8%; ▌John H. Lumpkin (Democratic) 15.8%; ▌David C. Campbell (Democratic) 15.8%; ▌Robert W. Pooler (Democratic) 15.8%; ▌Junius Hillyer (Democratic) 15.8%; ▌Alfred Iverson Sr. (Democratic) 15.7%; ▌Josiah S. Patterson (Democratic) 15.7% |
| Georgia at-large 9 seats on a general ticket | Julius C. Alford | Whig | 1837 (special); 1837 (term expired); 1838 | Incumbent re-elected. Incumbent then resigned October 1, 1841, leading to a special election; see above. | |
| Georgia at-large 9 seats on a general ticket | Vacant | | | Rep. Walter T. Colquitt (W) resigned July 21, 1840. Whig hold. Winner was not elected to finish the current term; see above. | |
| Georgia at-large 9 seats on a general ticket | Richard W. Habersham | Whig | 1838 | Incumbent re-elected. | |
| Georgia at-large 9 seats on a general ticket | T. Butler King | Whig | 1838 | Incumbent re-elected. | |
| Georgia at-large 9 seats on a general ticket | Lott Warren | Whig | 1838 | Incumbent re-elected. | |
| Georgia at-large 9 seats on a general ticket | E. A. Nisbet | Whig | 1838 | Incumbent re-elected. Incumbent then resigned October 12, 1841, leading to a special election; see above. | |
| Georgia at-large 9 seats on a general ticket | Edward J. Black | Whig | 1838 | Incumbent lost re-election as a Democrat. Whig hold. | |
| Georgia at-large 9 seats on a general ticket | Mark A. Cooper | Whig | 1838 | Incumbent lost re-election as a Democrat. Whig hold. | |

== Illinois ==
Elections were held August 2, 1841, after the March 4, 1841 beginning of the term and after the House first convened on May 31, 1841.

| District | Incumbent | | | This race | |
| District | Member | Party | First elected | Results | Candidates |
|---|---|---|---|---|---|
| Illinois 1 | John Reynolds | Democratic | 1834 (special); 1836 (lost); 1838 | Incumbent re-elected. | ▌ ✓ John Reynolds (Democratic) 59.5%; ▌Henry L. Webb (Whig) 39.3%; ▌Stephen R. Rowan (Whig) 1.2% |
| Illinois 2 | Zadok Casey | Democratic | 1832 | Incumbent re-elected as an Independent Democrat. Independent Democratic gain. | ▌ ✓ Zadok Casey (Ind. Democratic) 50.6%; ▌Stinson Anderson (Democratic) 49.4% |
| Illinois 3 | John T. Stuart | Whig | 1838 | Incumbent re-elected. | ▌ ✓ John T. Stuart (Whig) 51.8%; ▌James H. Ralston (Democratic) 46.8%; ▌Frederick Collins (Liberty) 1.2%; Scattering 0.2% |

== Indiana ==
The election was held May 3, 1841, after the March 4, 1841 beginning of the term, but before the House first convened on May 31, 1841.

| District | Incumbent | | | This race | |
| District | Member | Party | First elected | Results | Candidates |
|---|---|---|---|---|---|
| Indiana 1 | George H. Proffit | Whig | 1839 | Incumbent re-elected. | ▌ ✓ George H. Proffit (Whig) 57.4%; ▌James Lockhart (Democratic) 42.6% |
| Indiana 2 | John W. Davis | Democratic | 1835; 1837 (retired); 1839 | Incumbent lost re-election. Whig gain. | ▌ ✓ Richard W. Thompson (Whig) 52.6%; ▌John W. Davis (Democratic) 47.4% |
| Indiana 3 | John Carr | Democratic | 1831; 1837 (retired); 1839 | Incumbent lost re-election. Whig gain. | ▌ ✓ Joseph L. White (Whig) 51.6%; ▌John Carr (Democratic) 48.4% |
| Indiana 4 | Thomas Smith | Democratic | 1839 | Incumbent lost re-election. Whig gain. | ▌ ✓ James H. Cravens (Whig) 54.7%; ▌Thomas Smith (Democratic) 45.3% |
| Indiana 5 | James Rariden | Whig | 1837 | Incumbent retired. Democratic gain. | ▌ ✓ Andrew Kennedy (Democratic) 39.9%; ▌Jonathan McCarty (Whig) 30.3%; ▌Caleb B. Smith (Whig) 28.5%; ▌Daniel Worth (Unknown) 1.1%; ▌Charles H. Test (Unknown) 0.2% |
| Indiana 6 | William W. Wick | Democratic | 1839 | Incumbent retired. Whig gain. | ▌ ✓ David Wallace (Whig) 53.9%; ▌Nathan B. Palmer (Democratic) 46.1% |
| Indiana 7 | Henry S. Lane | Whig | 1840 (special) | Incumbent re-elected. | ▌ ✓ Henry S. Lane (Whig) 59.7%; ▌John Bryce (Democratic) 40.3% |

== Iowa Territory ==
See Non-voting delegates, below.

== Kentucky ==
Elections were held April 26, 1841, after the March 4, 1841 beginning of the term, but before the House first convened on May 31, 1841.

| District | Incumbent | | | This race | |
| District | Member | Party | First elected | Results | Candidates |
|---|---|---|---|---|---|
| Kentucky 1 | Linn Boyd | Democratic | 1835; 1837 (lost); 1839 | Incumbent re-elected. | ▌ ✓ Linn Boyd (Democratic); Unopposed |
| Kentucky 2 | Philip Triplett | Whig | 1839 | Incumbent re-elected. | ▌ ✓ Philip Triplett (Whig); ▌John H. McHenry (Whig); [data missing] |
| Kentucky 3 | Joseph R. Underwood | Whig | 1835 | Incumbent re-elected. | ▌ ✓ Joseph R. Underwood (Whig) 72.7%; ▌J. W. Irwin (Whig) 27.3% |
| Kentucky 4 | Sherrod Williams | Whig | 1835 | Incumbent retired. Whig hold. | ▌ ✓ Bryan Owsley (Whig); ▌Martin Beatty (Whig); ▌Nathan Gaither (Democratic); [data missing] |
| Kentucky 5 | John B. Thompson | Whig | 1840 (special) | Incumbent re-elected. | ▌ ✓ John B. Thompson (Whig) 36.6%; ▌Thomas P. Moore (Democratic) 33.7%; ▌John Kinkead (Whig) 29.7% |
| Kentucky 6 | Willis Green | Whig | 1839 | Incumbent re-elected. | ▌ ✓ Willis Green (Whig) 38.2%; ▌John L. Helm (Whig) 33.2%; ▌[FNU] Hough (Unknown) 28.6% |
| Kentucky 7 | John Pope | Whig | 1837 | Incumbent re-elected. | ▌ ✓ John Pope (Whig) 94.6%; ▌[FNU] Gray (Unknown) 5.4% |
| Kentucky 8 | William J. Graves | Whig | 1835 | Incumbent retired. Whig hold. | ▌ ✓ James Sprigg (Whig) 66.3%; ▌William H. Field (Whig) 33.6% |
| Kentucky 9 | John White | Whig | 1835 | Incumbent re-elected. | ▌ ✓ John White (Whig); Unopposed |
| Kentucky 10 | Richard Hawes | Whig | 1837 | Incumbent retired. Whig hold. | ▌ ✓ Thomas F. Marshall (Whig); ▌Larkin B. Smith (Whig); [data missing] |
| Kentucky 11 | Landaff Andrews | Whig | 1839 | Incumbent re-elected. | ▌ ✓ Landaff Andrews (Whig) 56.5%; ▌John L. Mason (Democratic) 43.5% |
| Kentucky 12 | Garrett Davis | Whig | 1839 | Incumbent re-elected. | ▌ ✓ Garrett Davis (Whig); [data missing] |
| Kentucky 13 | William O. Butler | Democratic | 1839 | Incumbent re-elected. | ▌ ✓ William O. Butler (Democratic) 52.8%; ▌William W. Southgate (Whig) 47.2% |

== Louisiana ==
Elections were held July 6–8, 1840.

| District | Incumbent | | | This race | |
| District | Member | Party | First elected | Results | Candidates |
|---|---|---|---|---|---|
| Louisiana 1 | Edward D. White Sr. | Whig | 1828; 1834 (resigned); 1838 | Incumbent re-elected. | ▌ ✓ Edward D. White Sr. (Whig) 68.3%; ▌Gilbert Leonard (Democratic) 31.7% |
| Louisiana 2 | Thomas W. Chinn | Whig | 1838 | Incumbent retired. Democratic gain. | ▌ ✓ John B. Dawson (Democratic) 50.2%; ▌Thomas G. Morgan (Whig) 49.8% |
| Louisiana 3 | Rice Garland | Whig | 1834 (special) | Incumbent retired. Whig hold. Incumbent then resigned July 21, 1840, leading to a special election; see above. | ▌ ✓ John Moore (Whig) 50.5%; ▌Richard Winn (Democratic) 49.5% |

== Maine ==
Elections were held September 14, 1840.

| District | Incumbent | | | This race | |
| District | Member | Party | First elected | Results | Candidates |
|---|---|---|---|---|---|
| Maine 1 | Nathan Clifford | Democratic | 1838 | Incumbent re-elected. | ▌ ✓ Nathan Clifford (Democratic) 54.6%; ▌Daniel Goodenow (Whig) 45.4% |
| Maine 2 | Albert Smith | Democratic | 1838 | Incumbent lost re-election. Whig gain. | ▌ ✓ William P. Fessenden (Whig) 50.6%; ▌Albert Smith (Democratic) 49.4% |
| Maine 3 | Benjamin Randall | Whig | 1838 | Incumbent re-elected. | ▌ ✓ Benjamin Randall (Whig) 54.5%; ▌Joseph Sewall (Democratic) 45.5% |
| Maine 4 | George Evans | Whig | 1829 (special) | Incumbent re-elected. Incumbent then resigned March 4, 1841, leading to a special election; see above. | ▌ ✓ George Evans (Whig) 62.5%; ▌John Hubbard (Democratic) 37.5% |
| Maine 5 | Virgil D. Parris | Democratic | 1838 (special) | Incumbent lost renomination and re-election. Democratic hold. | First ballot (September 14, 1840): ▌Zadoc Long (Whig) 43.9%; ▌Nathaniel Littlefield (Democratic) 39.8%; ▌Virgil D. Parris (Democratic) 16.3%; Second ballot (November 30, 1840): ▌Nathaniel Littlefield (Democratic) 49.7%; ▌Zadoc Long (Whig) 44.3%; ▌Joseph G. Cole (Unknown) 3.6%; ▌Joseph Tobin (Unknown) 2.4%; Third ballot (January 18, 1841): ▌ ✓ Nathaniel Littlefield (Democratic) 51.6%; ▌Zadoc Long (Whig) 43.8%; ▌Joseph G. Cole (Unknown) 1.3%; ▌David Hammond (Unknown) 1.0%; ▌Joseph Tobin (Unknown) 0.7%; Scattering 1.6% |
| Maine 6 | Hugh J. Anderson | Democratic | 1837 | Incumbent retired. Democratic hold. | ▌ ✓ Alfred Marshall (Democratic) 58.9%; ▌Stanford A. Kingsbury (Whig) 40.3%; ▌[FNU] Thorndike (Unknown) 0.8% |
| Maine 7 | Joshua A. Lowell | Democratic | 1838 | Incumbent re-elected. | First ballot (September 14, 1840): ▌Joseph C. Noyes (Whig) 49.7%; ▌Joshua A. Lowell (Democratic) 47.3%; ▌Samuel Wheeler (Unknown) 3.0%; Second ballot (November 30, 1840): ▌ ✓ Joshua A. Lowell (Democratic) 50.0%; ▌Joseph C. Noyes (Whig) 48.7%; ▌Samuel Wheeler (Unknown) 1.3% |
| Maine 8 | Thomas Davee | Democratic | 1836 | Incumbent retired. Whig gain. | ▌ ✓ Elisha H. Allen (Whig) 51.7%; ▌Hannibal Hamlin (Democratic) 47.5%; ▌Henry Ingalls (Unknown) 0.8% |

== Maryland ==
Elections were held May 17, 1841, after the March 4, 1841 beginning of the term, but before the House first convened on May 31, 1841.

| District | Incumbent | | | This race | |
| District | Member | Party | First elected | Results | Candidates |
|---|---|---|---|---|---|
| Maryland 1 | John Dennis | Whig | 1837 | Incumbent retired. Whig hold. | ▌ ✓ Isaac D. Jones (Whig) 50.1%; ▌Joseph S. Cottman (Whig) 49.9% |
| Maryland 2 | Philip F. Thomas | Democratic | 1839 | Incumbent retired. Whig gain. | ▌ ✓ James Pearce (Whig) 50.1%; Unopposed |
| Maryland 3 | John T. H. Worthington | Democratic | 1831; 1833 (lost); 1837 | Incumbent retired. Democratic hold. | ▌ ✓ James W. Williams (Democratic) 68.5%; ▌John Orrick (Democratic) 31.5% |
| Maryland 4 Plural district with 2 seats | James Carroll | Democratic | 1839 | Incumbent retired. Whig gain. | ▌ ✓ Alexander Randall (Whig) 25.2%; ▌ ✓ John P. Kennedy (Whig) 25.1%; ▌James Murray (Democratic) 24.9%; ▌Frank Gallagher (Democratic) 24.8% |
| Maryland 4 Plural district with 2 seats | Solomon Hillen Jr. | Democratic | 1839 | Incumbent retired. Whig gain. | ▌ ✓ Alexander Randall (Whig) 25.2%; ▌ ✓ John P. Kennedy (Whig) 25.1%; ▌James Murray (Democratic) 24.9%; ▌Frank Gallagher (Democratic) 24.8% |
| Maryland 5 | William C. Johnson | Whig | 1833; 1835 (lost); 1837 | Incumbent re-elected. | ▌ ✓ William C. Johnson (Whig) 68.3%; ▌Anthony Kimmell (Whig) 31.7% |
| Maryland 6 | Francis Thomas | Democratic | 1831 | Incumbent retired. Democratic hold. | ▌ ✓ John Thomson Mason Jr. (Democratic) 52.6%; ▌Edward Lynch (Whig) 47.4% |
| Maryland 8 | Daniel Jenifer | Whig | 1831; 1833 (lost); 1835 | Incumbent retired. Whig hold. | ▌ ✓ Augustus R. Sollers (Whig) 61.3%; ▌Thomas Somervell (Independent) 38.7% |

== Massachusetts ==
Elections were held November 9, 1840.

| District | Incumbent | | | This race | |
| District | Member | Party | First elected | Results | Candidates |
|---|---|---|---|---|---|
| Massachusetts 1 | Vacant | | | Rep. Abbott Lawrence (W) resigned September 18, 1840. Whig hold. Winner also elected the same day to finish the current term; see above. | ▌ ✓ Robert C. Winthrop (Whig) 63.3%; ▌Bradford Sumner (Democratic) 36.7% |
| Massachusetts 2 | Leverett Saltonstall | Whig | 1838 (special) | Incumbent re-elected. | ▌ ✓ Leverett Saltonstall (Whig) 59.0%; ▌Robert Rantoul Jr. (Democratic) 41.0% |
| Massachusetts 3 | Caleb Cushing | Whig | 1834 | Incumbent re-elected. | ▌ ✓ Caleb Cushing (Whig) 61.7%; ▌Gayton P. Osgood (Democratic) 38.3% |
| Massachusetts 4 | William Parmenter | Democratic | 1836 | Incumbent re-elected. | ▌ ✓ William Parmenter (Democratic) 50.3%; ▌Nathan Brooks (Whig) 48.4%; ▌David Goodale (Unknown) 1.3% |
| Massachusetts 5 | Levi Lincoln | Whig | 1834 (special) | Incumbent re-elected. Incumbent then resigned March 16, 1841, leading to a special election; see above. | ▌ ✓ Levi Lincoln (Whig) 63.1%; ▌Isaac Davis (Democratic) 36.9% |
| Massachusetts 6 | Osmyn Baker | Whig | 1839 (special) | Incumbent re-elected. | ▌ ✓ Osmyn Baker (Whig) 63.6%; ▌Rodolphus Dickerson (Democratic) 36.4% |
| Massachusetts 7 | George N. Briggs | Whig | 1830 | Incumbent re-elected. | ▌ ✓ George N. Briggs (Whig) 54.5%; ▌Henry W. Bishop (Democratic) 45.5% |
| Massachusetts 8 | William B. Calhoun | Whig | 1834 | Incumbent re-elected. | ▌ ✓ William B. Calhoun (Whig) 57.0%; ▌Chester W. Chapin (Democratic) 43.0% |
| Massachusetts 9 | William S. Hastings | Whig | 1836 | Incumbent re-elected. | ▌ ✓ William S. Hastings (Whig) 58.5%; ▌Alexander H. Everett (Democratic) 41.5% |
| Massachusetts 10 | Henry Williams | Democratic | 1838 | Incumbent lost re-election. Whig gain. | First ballot (November 9, 1840): ▌Henry Williams (Democratic) 49.8%; ▌Nathaniel B. Borden (Whig) 49.6%; ▌Otis Thompson (Unknown) 0.6%; Second ballot (January 4, 1841): ▌ ✓ Nathaniel B. Borden (Whig) 52.4%; ▌Henry Williams (Democratic) 45.3%; ▌George W. Johnson (Unknown) 2.3% |
| Massachusetts 11 | John Reed Jr. | Whig | 1812; 1817 (lost); 1820 | Incumbent retired. Whig hold. | ▌ ✓ Barker Burnell (Whig) 60.3%; ▌Henry Crocker (Democratic) 39.7% |
| Massachusetts 12 | John Quincy Adams | Whig | 1830 | Incumbent re-elected. | ▌ ✓ John Quincy Adams (Whig) 54.6%; ▌William M. Jackson (Democratic) 45.4% |

== Mississippi ==
The election was held November 1–2, 1841, after the March 4, 1841 beginning of the term and after the House first convened on May 31, 1841.

| District | Incumbent | | | This race | |
| District | Member | Party | First elected | Results | Candidates |
|---|---|---|---|---|---|
| Mississippi at-large 2 seats on a general ticket | Albert G. Brown | Democratic | 1839 | Incumbent retired. Democratic hold. | ▌ ✓ Jacob Thompson (Democratic) 26.8%; ▌ ✓ William M. Gwin (Democratic) 26.7%; ▌Adam L. Benjamin (Whig) 23.4%; ▌William Harley (Whig) 23.0% |
| Mississippi at-large 2 seats on a general ticket | Jacob Thompson | Democratic | 1839 | Incumbent re-elected. | ▌ ✓ Jacob Thompson (Democratic) 26.8%; ▌ ✓ William M. Gwin (Democratic) 26.7%; ▌Adam L. Benjamin (Whig) 23.4%; ▌William Harley (Whig) 23.0% |

== Michigan ==
The election was held November 3, 1840.

| District | Incumbent | | | This race | |
| District | Member | Party | First elected | Results | Candidates |
|---|---|---|---|---|---|
| Michigan at-large | Isaac E. Crary | Democratic | 1835 | Incumbent retired. Whig gain. | ▌ ✓ Jacob M. Howard (Whig) 51.5%; ▌Alpheus French (Democratic) 48.5% |

== Missouri ==
The election was held August 3, 1840.

| District | Incumbent | | | This race | |
| District | Member | Party | First elected | Results | Candidates |
|---|---|---|---|---|---|
| Missouri at-large 2 seats on a general ticket | John Jameson | Democratic | 1839 (special) | Incumbent retired. Democratic hold. | ▌ ✓ John Miller (Democratic) 29.1%; ▌ ✓ John C. Edwards (Democratic) 28.9%; ▌Edward Samuels (Whig) 21.1%; ▌George C. Sibley (Whig) 21.0% |
| Missouri at-large 2 seats on a general ticket | John Miller | Democratic | 1836 | Incumbent re-elected. | ▌ ✓ John Miller (Democratic) 29.1%; ▌ ✓ John C. Edwards (Democratic) 28.9%; ▌Edward Samuels (Whig) 21.1%; ▌George C. Sibley (Whig) 21.0% |

== New Hampshire ==
The election was held March 9, 1841, after the March 4, 1841 beginning of the term, but before the House first convened on May 31, 1841.

| District | Incumbent | | | This race | |
| District | Member | Party | First elected | Results | Candidates |
|---|---|---|---|---|---|
| New Hampshire at-large 5 seats on a general ticket | Tristram Shaw | Democratic | 1839 | Incumbent re-elected. | ▌ ✓ Tristram Shaw (Democratic) 11.4%; ▌ ✓ Charles G. Atherton (Democratic) 11.4%; ▌ ✓ Edmund Burke (Democratic) 11.4%; ▌ ✓ Ira A. Eastman (Democratic) 11.4%; ▌ ✓ John R. Reding (Democratic) 11.3%; ▌Joel Eastman (Whig) 8.2%; ▌Levi Chamberlain (Whig) 8.2%; ▌George Y. Sawyer (Whig) 8.2%; ▌Ichabod Goodwin (Whig) 8.2%; ▌Joseph Sawyer (Whig) 8.0%; ▌Jared Perkins (Liberty) 0.5%; ▌John Folsom (Liberty) 0.5%; ▌Isaac Crosby (Liberty) 0.5%; ▌Johnson D. Quimby (Liberty) 0.5%; ▌Moses A. Cartland (Liberty) 0.5% |
| New Hampshire at-large 5 seats on a general ticket | Ira A. Eastman | Democratic | 1839 | Incumbent re-elected. | |
| New Hampshire at-large 5 seats on a general ticket | Jared W. Williams | Democratic | 1837 | Incumbent retired. Democratic hold. | |
| New Hampshire at-large 5 seats on a general ticket | Charles G. Atherton | Democratic | 1837 | Incumbent re-elected. | |
| New Hampshire at-large 5 seats on a general ticket | Edmund Burke | Democratic | 1839 | Incumbent re-elected. | |

== New Jersey ==
The election was held November 2–3, 1840.

| District | Incumbent | | | This race | |
| District | Member | Party | First elected | Results | Candidates |
|---|---|---|---|---|---|
| New Jersey at-large 6 seats on a general ticket | Peter D. Vroom | Democratic | 1838 | Incumbent lost re-election. Whig gain. | ▌ ✓ William Halstead (Whig) 8.6%; ▌ ✓ Charles C. Stratton (Whig) 8.6%; ▌ ✓ Joseph F. Randolph (Whig) 8.6%; ▌ ✓ John P. Maxwell (Whig) 8.6%; ▌ ✓ John B. Aycrigg (Whig) 8.6%; ▌ ✓ Thomas J. Yorke (Whig) 8.6%; ▌Peter D. Vroom (Democratic) 8.1%; ▌Joseph Kille (Democratic) 8.0%; ▌William R. Cooper (Democratic) 8.0%; ▌Phineas B. Kennedy (Democratic) 8.0%; ▌Philemon Dickerson (Democratic) 8.0%; ▌Daniel B. Ryall (Democratic) 8.0% |
| New Jersey at-large 6 seats on a general ticket | Philemon Dickerson | Democratic | 1832; 1836 (resigned); 1838 | Incumbent lost re-election. Whig gain. | ▌ ✓ William Halstead (Whig) 8.6%; ▌ ✓ Charles C. Stratton (Whig) 8.6%; ▌ ✓ Joseph F. Randolph (Whig) 8.6%; ▌ ✓ John P. Maxwell (Whig) 8.6%; ▌ ✓ John B. Aycrigg (Whig) 8.6%; ▌ ✓ Thomas J. Yorke (Whig) 8.6%; ▌Peter D. Vroom (Democratic) 8.1%; ▌Joseph Kille (Democratic) 8.0%; ▌William R. Cooper (Democratic) 8.0%; ▌Phineas B. Kennedy (Democratic) 8.0%; ▌Philemon Dickerson (Democratic) 8.0%; ▌Daniel B. Ryall (Democratic) 8.0% |
| New Jersey at-large 6 seats on a general ticket | William R. Cooper | Democratic | 1838 | Incumbent lost re-election. Whig gain. | ▌ ✓ William Halstead (Whig) 8.6%; ▌ ✓ Charles C. Stratton (Whig) 8.6%; ▌ ✓ Joseph F. Randolph (Whig) 8.6%; ▌ ✓ John P. Maxwell (Whig) 8.6%; ▌ ✓ John B. Aycrigg (Whig) 8.6%; ▌ ✓ Thomas J. Yorke (Whig) 8.6%; ▌Peter D. Vroom (Democratic) 8.1%; ▌Joseph Kille (Democratic) 8.0%; ▌William R. Cooper (Democratic) 8.0%; ▌Phineas B. Kennedy (Democratic) 8.0%; ▌Philemon Dickerson (Democratic) 8.0%; ▌Daniel B. Ryall (Democratic) 8.0% |
| New Jersey at-large 6 seats on a general ticket | Daniel B. Ryall | Democratic | 1838 | Incumbent lost re-election. Whig gain. | ▌ ✓ William Halstead (Whig) 8.6%; ▌ ✓ Charles C. Stratton (Whig) 8.6%; ▌ ✓ Joseph F. Randolph (Whig) 8.6%; ▌ ✓ John P. Maxwell (Whig) 8.6%; ▌ ✓ John B. Aycrigg (Whig) 8.6%; ▌ ✓ Thomas J. Yorke (Whig) 8.6%; ▌Peter D. Vroom (Democratic) 8.1%; ▌Joseph Kille (Democratic) 8.0%; ▌William R. Cooper (Democratic) 8.0%; ▌Phineas B. Kennedy (Democratic) 8.0%; ▌Philemon Dickerson (Democratic) 8.0%; ▌Daniel B. Ryall (Democratic) 8.0% |
| New Jersey at-large 6 seats on a general ticket | Joseph Kille | Democratic | 1838 | Incumbent lost re-election. Whig gain. | ▌ ✓ William Halstead (Whig) 8.6%; ▌ ✓ Charles C. Stratton (Whig) 8.6%; ▌ ✓ Joseph F. Randolph (Whig) 8.6%; ▌ ✓ John P. Maxwell (Whig) 8.6%; ▌ ✓ John B. Aycrigg (Whig) 8.6%; ▌ ✓ Thomas J. Yorke (Whig) 8.6%; ▌Peter D. Vroom (Democratic) 8.1%; ▌Joseph Kille (Democratic) 8.0%; ▌William R. Cooper (Democratic) 8.0%; ▌Phineas B. Kennedy (Democratic) 8.0%; ▌Philemon Dickerson (Democratic) 8.0%; ▌Daniel B. Ryall (Democratic) 8.0% |
| New Jersey at-large 6 seats on a general ticket | Joseph F. Randolph | Whig | 1836 | Incumbent re-elected. | ▌ ✓ William Halstead (Whig) 8.6%; ▌ ✓ Charles C. Stratton (Whig) 8.6%; ▌ ✓ Joseph F. Randolph (Whig) 8.6%; ▌ ✓ John P. Maxwell (Whig) 8.6%; ▌ ✓ John B. Aycrigg (Whig) 8.6%; ▌ ✓ Thomas J. Yorke (Whig) 8.6%; ▌Peter D. Vroom (Democratic) 8.1%; ▌Joseph Kille (Democratic) 8.0%; ▌William R. Cooper (Democratic) 8.0%; ▌Phineas B. Kennedy (Democratic) 8.0%; ▌Philemon Dickerson (Democratic) 8.0%; ▌Daniel B. Ryall (Democratic) 8.0% |

== New York ==
Elections were held November 2–4, 1840.

| District | Incumbent | | | This race | |
| District | Member | Party | First elected | Results | Candidates |
|---|---|---|---|---|---|
| New York 1 | Thomas B. Jackson | Democratic | 1836 | Incumbent retired. Democratic hold. | ▌ ✓ Charles A. Floyd (Democratic) 55.4%; ▌William P. Buffett (Whig) 44.6% |
| New York 2 | James De La Montanya | Democratic | 1838 | Incumbent retired. Democratic hold. | ▌ ✓ Joseph Egbert (Democratic) 54.0%; ▌Lawrence Hiller (Whig) 46.0% |
| New York 3 Plural district with 4 seats | Ogden Hoffman | Whig | 1836 | Incumbent retired. Democratic gain. | ▌ ✓ James I. Roosevelt (Democratic) 12.9%; ▌ ✓ Charles G. Ferris (Democratic) 12.9%; ▌ ✓ John McKeon (Democratic) 12.7%; ▌ ✓ Fernando Wood (Democratic) 12.7%; ▌Moses H. Grinnell (Whig) 12.3%; ▌James Monroe (Whig) 12.2%; ▌Robert Smith (Whig) 12.2%; ▌J. Prescott Hall (Whig) 12.2% |
| New York 3 Plural district with 4 seats | Moses H. Grinnell | Whig | 1838 | Incumbent lost re-election. Democratic gain. | ▌ ✓ James I. Roosevelt (Democratic) 12.9%; ▌ ✓ Charles G. Ferris (Democratic) 12.9%; ▌ ✓ John McKeon (Democratic) 12.7%; ▌ ✓ Fernando Wood (Democratic) 12.7%; ▌Moses H. Grinnell (Whig) 12.3%; ▌James Monroe (Whig) 12.2%; ▌Robert Smith (Whig) 12.2%; ▌J. Prescott Hall (Whig) 12.2% |
| New York 3 Plural district with 4 seats | Edward Curtis | Whig | 1836 | Incumbent retired. Democratic gain. | ▌ ✓ James I. Roosevelt (Democratic) 12.9%; ▌ ✓ Charles G. Ferris (Democratic) 12.9%; ▌ ✓ John McKeon (Democratic) 12.7%; ▌ ✓ Fernando Wood (Democratic) 12.7%; ▌Moses H. Grinnell (Whig) 12.3%; ▌James Monroe (Whig) 12.2%; ▌Robert Smith (Whig) 12.2%; ▌J. Prescott Hall (Whig) 12.2% |
| New York 3 Plural district with 4 seats | James Monroe | Whig | 1838 | Incumbent lost re-election. Democratic gain. | ▌ ✓ James I. Roosevelt (Democratic) 12.9%; ▌ ✓ Charles G. Ferris (Democratic) 12.9%; ▌ ✓ John McKeon (Democratic) 12.7%; ▌ ✓ Fernando Wood (Democratic) 12.7%; ▌Moses H. Grinnell (Whig) 12.3%; ▌James Monroe (Whig) 12.2%; ▌Robert Smith (Whig) 12.2%; ▌J. Prescott Hall (Whig) 12.2% |
| New York 4 | Gouverneur Kemble | Democratic | 1836 | Incumbent retired. Democratic hold. | ▌ ✓ Aaron Ward (Democratic) 54.6%; ▌Nicholas Cruger (Whig) 45.4% |
| New York 5 | Charles Johnston | Whig | 1838 | Incumbent lost re-election. Democratic gain. | ▌ ✓ Richard D. Davis (Democratic) 51.1%; ▌Charles Johnston (Whig) 48.9% |
| New York 6 | Nathaniel Jones | Democratic | 1836 | Incumbent retired. Democratic hold. | ▌ ✓ James G. Clinton (Democratic) 52.8%; ▌Thomas McKissock (Whig) 47.2% |
| New York 7 | Rufus Palen | Whig | 1838 | Incumbent retired. Democratic gain. | ▌ ✓ John Van Buren (Democratic) 50.3%; ▌Benjamin R. Bevier (Whig) 49.7% |
| New York 8 Plural district with 2 seats | John Ely | Democratic | 1838 | Incumbent retired. Democratic hold. | ▌ ✓ Jacob Houck Jr. (Democratic) 26.3%; ▌ ✓ Robert McClellan (Democratic) 26.2%; ▌Jedediah Miller (Whig) 23.8%; ▌Justus McKinstry (Whig) 23.8% |
| New York 8 Plural district with 2 seats | Aaron Vanderpoel | Democratic | 1832; 1836 (retired); 1838 | Incumbent retired. Democratic hold. | ▌ ✓ Jacob Houck Jr. (Democratic) 26.3%; ▌ ✓ Robert McClellan (Democratic) 26.2%; ▌Jedediah Miller (Whig) 23.8%; ▌Justus McKinstry (Whig) 23.8% |
| New York 9 | Hiram P. Hunt | Whig | 1834; 1836 (lost); 1838 | Incumbent re-elected. | ▌ ✓ Hiram P. Hunt (Whig) 51.0%; ▌Samuel S. Fowler (Democratic) 48.7%; ▌Preston Sheldon (Liberty) 0.3% |
| New York 10 | Daniel D. Barnard | Whig | 1826; 1828 (lost); 1838 | Incumbent re-elected. | ▌ ✓ Daniel D. Barnard (Whig) 51.4%; ▌James M. French (Democratic) 48.3%; ▌George W. Durant (Liberty) 0.3% |
| New York 11 | Vacant | | | Rep. Anson Brown (W) died June 14, 1840. Whig hold. Winner was not elected the same day to finish the current term; see above. | ▌ ✓ Archibald L. Linn (Whig) 52.1%; ▌John Cramer (Democratic) 47.8%; ▌John P. Beckley (Liberty) 0.1% |
| New York 12 | David Russell | Whig | 1834 | Incumbent retired. Whig hold. | ▌ ✓ Bernard Blair (Whig) 61.7%; ▌Orville Clark (Democratic) 37.8%; ▌Hiram Corlies (Liberty) 0.5% |
| New York 13 | Augustus C. Hand | Democratic | 1838 | Incumbent lost re-election. Whig gain. | ▌ ✓ Thomas A. Tomlinson (Whig) 53.6%; ▌Augustus C. Hand (Democratic) 46.4% |
| New York 14 | John Fine | Democratic | 1838 | Incumbent retired. Whig gain. | ▌ ✓ Henry Van Rensselaer (Whig) 51.3%; ▌Preston King (Democratic) 48.7% |
| New York 15 | Peter J. Wagner | Whig | 1838 | Incumbent retired. Democratic gain. | ▌ ✓ John Sanford (Democratic) 52.8%; ▌Marcellus Weston (Whig) 46.8%; ▌Ellis Clisbe (Liberty) 0.4% |
| New York 16 | Andrew W. Doig | Democratic | 1838 | Incumbent re-elected. | ▌ ✓ Andrew W. Doig (Democratic) 55.2%; ▌Harvey W. Doolittle (Whig) 44.0%; ▌Stephen Crosby (Liberty) 0.8% |
| New York 17 Plural district with 2 seats | David P. Brewster | Democratic | 1838 | Incumbent re-elected. | ▌ ✓ David P. Brewster (Democratic) 25.0%; ▌ ✓ John G. Floyd (Democratic) 24.9%; ▌Fortune C. White (Whig) 24.0%; ▌Thomas H. Bond (Whig) 23.8%; ▌Arba Blair (Liberty) 1.1%; ▌James Brown (Liberty) 1.1% |
| New York 17 Plural district with 2 seats | John G. Floyd | Democratic | 1838 | Incumbent re-elected. | ▌ ✓ David P. Brewster (Democratic) 25.0%; ▌ ✓ John G. Floyd (Democratic) 24.9%; ▌Fortune C. White (Whig) 24.0%; ▌Thomas H. Bond (Whig) 23.8%; ▌Arba Blair (Liberty) 1.1%; ▌James Brown (Liberty) 1.1% |
| New York 18 | Thomas C. Chittenden | Whig | 1838 | Incumbent re-elected. | ▌ ✓ Thomas C. Chittenden (Whig) 51.9%; ▌Alpheus Green (Democratic) 48.1% |
| New York 19 | John H. Prentiss | Democratic | 1836 | Incumbent retired. Democratic hold. | ▌ ✓ Samuel S. Bowne (Democratic) 53.5%; ▌David M. Hard (Whig) 46.0%; ▌Isaac S. Ford (Liberty) 0.5% |
| New York 20 | Judson Allen | Democratic | 1838 | Incumbent retired. Democratic hold. | ▌ ✓ Samuel Gordon (Democratic) 52.4%; ▌Herman D. Gould (Whig) 47.6% |
| New York 21 | John C. Clark | Whig | 1826; 1828 (retired); 1836 | Incumbent re-elected. | ▌ ✓ John C. Clark (Whig) 51.3%; ▌John Tracy (Democratic) 48.7% |
| New York 22 Plural district with 2 seats | Amasa Dana | Democratic | 1838 | Incumbent retired. Democratic hold. | ▌ ✓ Samuel Partridge (Democratic) 25.2%; ▌ ✓ Lewis Riggs (Democratic) 25.1%; ▌Ezra S. Sweet (Whig) 24.9%; ▌James Dunn (Whig) 24.8% |
| New York 22 Plural district with 2 seats | Stephen B. Leonard | Democratic | 1834; 1836 (retired); 1838 | Incumbent retired. Democratic hold. | ▌ ✓ Samuel Partridge (Democratic) 25.2%; ▌ ✓ Lewis Riggs (Democratic) 25.1%; ▌Ezra S. Sweet (Whig) 24.9%; ▌James Dunn (Whig) 24.8% |
| New York 23 Plural district with 2 seats | Nehemiah H. Earll | Democratic | 1838 | Incumbent lost re-election. Whig gain. | ▌ ✓ Victory Birdseye (Whig) 24.8%; ▌ ✓ A. Lawrence Foster (Whig) 24.8%; ▌Nehemiah H. Earll (Democratic) 24.6%; ▌William J. Hough (Democratic) 24.6%; ▌John Pratt (Liberty) 0.6%; ▌Robert Furman (Liberty) 0.5% |
| New York 23 Plural district with 2 seats | Edward Rogers | Democratic | 1838 | Incumbent retired. Whig gain. | ▌ ✓ Victory Birdseye (Whig) 24.8%; ▌ ✓ A. Lawrence Foster (Whig) 24.8%; ▌Nehemiah H. Earll (Democratic) 24.6%; ▌William J. Hough (Democratic) 24.6%; ▌John Pratt (Liberty) 0.6%; ▌Robert Furman (Liberty) 0.5% |
| New York 24 | Christopher Morgan | Whig | 1838 | Incumbent re-elected. | ▌ ✓ Christopher Morgan (Whig) 50.8%; ▌Peter Yawger (Democratic) 48.7%; ▌Samuel S. Cuyler (Liberty) 0.5% |
| New York 25 | Theron R. Strong | Democratic | 1838 | Incumbent retired. Whig gain. | ▌ ✓ John Maynard (Whig) 50.6%; ▌John De Mott (Democratic) 49.2%; ▌Aaron T. Hendrick (Liberty) 0.2% |
| New York 26 | Francis Granger | Whig | 1834; 1836 (retired); 1838 | Incumbent re-elected. Incumbent then resigned March 5, 1841, leading to a special election; see above. | ▌ ✓ Francis Granger (Whig) 57.0%; ▌Jared Wilson (Democratic) 41.1%; ▌Hiram Pitts (Liberty) 1.9% |
| New York 27 | Meredith Mallory | Democratic | 1838 | Incumbent retired. Democratic hold. | ▌ ✓ William M. Oliver (Democratic) 53.0%; ▌Thomas A. Johnson (Whig) 47.0% |
| New York 28 | Thomas Kempshall | Whig | 1838 | Incumbent retired. Whig hold. | ▌ ✓ Timothy Childs (Whig) 53.9%; ▌Lyman B. Langworthy (Democratic) 45.4%; ▌James Sperry (Liberty) 0.7% |
| New York 29 | Seth M. Gates | Whig | 1838 | Incumbent re-elected. | ▌ ✓ Seth M. Gates (Whig) 63.4%; ▌John B. Skinner (Democratic) 35.3%; ▌William Chapin (Liberty) 1.3% |
| New York 30 | Luther C. Peck | Whig | 1836 | Incumbent retired. Whig hold. | ▌ ✓ John Young (Whig) 56.7%; ▌Leman Gibbs (Democratic) 43.3% |
| New York 31 | Richard P. Marvin | Whig | 1836 | Incumbent retired. Whig hold. | ▌ ✓ Staley N. Clarke (Whig) 60.2%; ▌Benjamin Chamberlain (Democratic) 39.2%; ▌Constant B. Allen (Liberty) 0.6% |
| New York 32 | Millard Fillmore | Whig | 1832; 1834 (retired); 1836 | Incumbent re-elected. | ▌ ✓ Millard Fillmore (Whig) 63.8%; ▌Leander J. Roberts (Democratic) 35.8%; ▌Henry More (Liberty) 0.4% |
| New York 33 | Charles F. Mitchell | Whig | 1836 | Incumbent retired. Whig hold. | ▌ ✓ Alfred Babcock (Whig) 55.4%; ▌Silas M. Burroughs (Democratic) 43.2%; ▌Almazer Hutchinson (Liberty) 1.4% |

== North Carolina ==
Elections were held May 13, 1841, after the March 4, 1841 beginning of the term, but before the House first convened on May 31, 1841.

| District | Incumbent | | | This race | |
| District | Member | Party | First elected | Results | Candidates |
|---|---|---|---|---|---|
| North Carolina 1 | Kenneth Rayner | Whig | 1839 | Incumbent re-elected. | ▌ ✓ Kenneth Rayner (Whig) 93.5%; Scattering 6.5% |
| North Carolina 2 | Jesse A. Bynum | Democratic | 1833 | Incumbent retired. Democratic hold. | ▌ ✓ John R. J. Daniel (Democratic); ▌William W. Cherry (Whig); [data missing] |
| North Carolina 3 | Edward Stanly | Whig | 1837 | Incumbent re-elected. | ▌ ✓ Edward Stanly (Whig) 68.2%; ▌Henry I. Toole (Democratic) 31.8% |
| North Carolina 4 | Charles B. Shepard | Democratic | 1837 (Note: Shepard was first elected as a Whig but won re-election in 1839 as a Democrat.) | Incumbent retired. Whig gain. | ▌ ✓ William H. Washington (Whig); ▌Josiah O. Watson (Democratic); [data missing] |
| North Carolina 5 | James I. McKay | Democratic | 1831 | Incumbent re-elected. | ▌ ✓ James I. McKay (Democratic) 85.7%; ▌[FNU] Baker (Whig) 14.3% |
| North Carolina 6 | Micajah T. Hawkins | Democratic | 1831 (special) | Incumbent lost re-election. Democratic hold. | ▌ ✓ Archibald H. Arrington (Democratic) 46.6%; ▌Micajah T. Hawkins (Democratic) 43.0%; ▌William Russell (Democratic) 10.4% |
| North Carolina 7 | Edmund Deberry | Whig | 1829; 1831 (lost); 1833 | Incumbent re-elected. | ▌ ✓ Edmund Deberry (Whig) 70.8%; ▌Edward McCollum (Democratic) 29.2% |
| North Carolina 8 | William Montgomery | Democratic | 1835 | Incumbent retired. Democratic hold. | ▌ ✓ Romulus M. Saunders (Democratic) 55.2%; ▌James S. Smith (Whig) 44.8% |
| North Carolina 9 | John Hill | Democratic | 1839 | Incumbent retired. Whig gain. | ▌ ✓ Augustine H. Shepperd (Whig) 52.6%; ▌David S. Reid (Democratic) 47.4% |
| North Carolina 10 | Charles Fisher | Democratic | 1819 (special); 1821 (retired); 1839 | Incumbent lost re-election. Whig gain. | ▌ ✓ Abraham Rencher (Whig); ▌Jonathan Worth (Democratic); ▌Charles Fisher (Democratic); [data missing] |
| North Carolina 11 | Henry William Connor | Democratic | 1821 | Incumbent retired. Democratic hold. | ▌ ✓ Greene W. Caldwell (Democratic) 57.2%; ▌Daniel M. Barringer (Whig) 42.8% |
| North Carolina 12 | James Graham | Whig | 1833; 1836 (seat declared vacant); 1836 (special) | Incumbent re-elected. | ▌ ✓ James Graham (Whig) 61.8%; ▌Thomas L. Clingman (Whig) 38.2% |
| North Carolina 13 | Lewis Williams | Whig | 1815 | Incumbent re-elected. | ▌ ✓ Lewis Williams (Whig) 65.7%; ▌Roderick Murchison (Whig) 34.3% |

== Ohio ==
Elections were held October 13, 1840.

| District | Incumbent | | | This race | |
| District | Member | Party | First elected | Results | Candidates |
|---|---|---|---|---|---|
| Ohio 1 | Alexander Duncan | Democratic | 1836 | Incumbent lost re-election. Whig gain. | ▌ ✓ Nathanael G. Pendleton (Whig) 50.7%; ▌Alexander Duncan (Democratic) 49.3% |
| Ohio 2 | John B. Weller | Democratic | 1838 | Incumbent re-elected. | ▌ ✓ John B. Weller (Democratic) 50.3%; ▌Lewis D. Campbell (Whig) 49.7% |
| Ohio 3 | Patrick G. Goode | Whig | 1836 | Incumbent re-elected. | ▌ ✓ Patrick G. Goode (Whig) 50.4%; ▌William Sawyer (Democratic) 49.6% |
| Ohio 4 | Vacant | | | Rep. Thomas Corwin (W) resigned May 30, 1840, to successfully run for Governor of Ohio. Whig hold. Winner also elected the same day to finish the current term; see above. | ▌ ✓ Jeremiah Morrow (Whig) 60.0%; ▌Benjamin Baldwin (Democratic) 40.0% |
| Ohio 5 | William Doan | Democratic | 1838 | Incumbent re-elected. | ▌ ✓ William Doan (Democratic) 53.7%; ▌Thomas L. Shields (Whig) 46.3% |
| Ohio 6 | Calvary Morris | Whig | 1836 | Incumbent re-elected. | ▌ ✓ Calvary Morris (Whig) 55.9%; ▌George House (Democratic) 44.1% |
| Ohio 7 | William K. Bond | Whig | 1834 | Incumbent retired. Whig hold. | ▌ ✓ William Russell (Whig) 56.8%; ▌Allen Latham (Democratic) 43.2% |
| Ohio 8 | Joseph Ridgway | Whig | 1836 | Incumbent re-elected. | ▌ ✓ Joseph Ridgway (Whig) 57.5%; ▌Henry N. Hedges (Democratic) 42.5% |
| Ohio 9 | William Medill | Democratic | 1838 | Incumbent re-elected. | ▌ ✓ William Medill (Democratic) 57.1%; ▌George Sanderson (Whig) 42.9% |
| Ohio 10 | Samson Mason | Whig | 1834 | Incumbent re-elected. | ▌ ✓ Samson Mason (Whig) 61.4%; ▌Matthew Bonner (Democratic) 38.6% |
| Ohio 11 | Isaac Parrish | Democratic | 1838 | Incumbent lost re-election. Whig gain. | ▌ ✓ Benjamin S. Cowen (Whig) 53.0%; ▌Isaac Parrish (Democratic) 47.0% |
| Ohio 12 | Jonathan Taylor | Democratic | 1838 | Incumbent lost re-election. Whig gain. | ▌ ✓ Joshua Mathiot (Whig) 53.7%; ▌Jonathan Taylor (Democratic) 46.3% |
| Ohio 13 | Daniel P. Leadbetter | Democratic | 1836 | Incumbent retired. Democratic hold. | ▌ ✓ James Mathews (Democratic) 53.6%; ▌Henry Curtis (Whig) 46.4% |
| Ohio 14 | George Sweeny | Democratic | 1838 | Incumbent re-elected. | ▌ ✓ George Sweeny (Democratic) 52.2%; ▌James Hedges (Whig) 47.8% |
| Ohio 15 | John W. Allen | Whig | 1836 | Incumbent retired. Whig hold. | ▌ ✓ Sherlock J. Andrews (Whig) 57.8%; ▌David K. Carter (Democratic) 42.2% |
| Ohio 16 | Joshua R. Giddings | Whig | 1838 (special) | Incumbent re-elected. | ▌ ✓ Joshua R. Giddings (Whig) 66.0%; ▌Thomas J. Mlain (Democratic) 34.0% |
| Ohio 17 | John Hastings | Democratic | 1838 | Incumbent re-elected. | ▌ ✓ John Hastings (Democratic) 50.3%; ▌Charles D. Coffin (Whig) 49.7% |
| Ohio 18 | David A. Starkweather | Democratic | 1838 | Incumbent retired. Democratic hold. | ▌ ✓ Ezra Dean (Democratic) 54.7%; ▌Levi Cox (Whig) 45.3% |
| Ohio 19 | Henry Swearingen | Democratic | 1838 (special) | Incumbent retired. Whig gain. | ▌ ✓ Samuel Stokely (Whig) 51.8%; ▌William C. McAuslen (Democratic) 48.2% |

== Pennsylvania ==
Elections were held October 13, 1840.

| District | Incumbent | | | This race | |
| District | Member | Party | First elected | Results | Candidates |
|---|---|---|---|---|---|
| Pennsylvania 1 | Lemuel Paynter | Democratic | 1836 | Incumbent retired. Democratic hold. | ▌ ✓ Charles Brown (Democratic) 58.0%; ▌Joseph W. Tyson (Whig) 42.0% |
| Pennsylvania 2 Plural district with 2 seats | George W. Toland | Whig | 1836 | Incumbent re-elected. | ▌ ✓ John Sergeant (Whig) 30.4%; ▌ ✓ George W. Toland (Whig) 30.4%; ▌Joseph C. Neal (Democratic) 19.7%; ▌Andrew Miller (Democratic) 19.5% |
| Pennsylvania 2 Plural district with 2 seats | John Sergeant | Whig | 1815 (special); 1822 (retired); 1827 (special); 1828 (lost); 1836 | Incumbent re-elected. Incumbent then resigned September 25, 1841, leading to a special election; see above. | ▌ ✓ John Sergeant (Whig) 30.4%; ▌ ✓ George W. Toland (Whig) 30.4%; ▌Joseph C. Neal (Democratic) 19.7%; ▌Andrew Miller (Democratic) 19.5% |
| Pennsylvania 3 | Charles Naylor | Whig | 1837 (special) | Incumbent retired. Democratic gain. | ▌ ✓ Charles J. Ingersoll (Democratic) 54.3%; ▌Morton McMichael (Whig) 45.7% |
| New York 4 Plural district with 3 seats | John Edwards | Anti-Masonic | 1838 | Incumbent re-elected as a Whig. Whig gain. | ▌ ✓ Francis James (Whig) 19.8%; ▌ ✓ John Edwards (Whig) 19.8%; ▌ ✓ Jeremiah Brown (Whig) 19.7%; ▌Isaac Winters (Democratic) 13.6%; ▌Joshua Evans Jr. (Democratic) 13.6%; ▌William Gray (Democratic) 13.6% |
| New York 4 Plural district with 3 seats | Edward Davies | Anti-Masonic | 1836 | Incumbent retired. Whig gain. | ▌ ✓ Francis James (Whig) 19.8%; ▌ ✓ John Edwards (Whig) 19.8%; ▌ ✓ Jeremiah Brown (Whig) 19.7%; ▌Isaac Winters (Democratic) 13.6%; ▌Joshua Evans Jr. (Democratic) 13.6%; ▌William Gray (Democratic) 13.6% |
| New York 4 Plural district with 3 seats | Francis James | Anti-Masonic | 1838 | Incumbent re-elected as a Whig. Whig gain. | ▌ ✓ Francis James (Whig) 19.8%; ▌ ✓ John Edwards (Whig) 19.8%; ▌ ✓ Jeremiah Brown (Whig) 19.7%; ▌Isaac Winters (Democratic) 13.6%; ▌Joshua Evans Jr. (Democratic) 13.6%; ▌William Gray (Democratic) 13.6% |
| Pennsylvania 5 | Joseph Fornance | Democratic | 1838 | Incumbent re-elected. | ▌ ✓ Joseph Fornance (Democratic) 54.9%; ▌Robert T. Potts (Whig) 45.1% |
| Pennsylvania 6 | John Davis | Democratic | 1838 | Incumbent lost re-election. Whig gain. | ▌ ✓ Robert Ramsey (Whig) 50.1%; ▌John Davis (Democratic) 49.9% |
| Pennsylvania 7 | David D. Wagener | Democratic | 1832 | Incumbent retired. Democratic hold. | ▌ ✓ John Westbrook (Democratic) 64.0%; ▌George Weber (Whig) 36.0% |
| Pennsylvania 8 | Peter Newhard | Democratic | 1838 | Incumbent re-elected. | ▌ ✓ Peter Newhard (Democratic) 55.7%; ▌Henry King (Whig) 44.3% |
| Pennsylvania 9 | George M. Keim | Democratic | 1838 (special) | Incumbent re-elected. | ▌ ✓ George M. Keim (Democratic); Unopposed |
| Pennsylvania 10 | William Simonton | Whig | 1838 | Incumbent re-elected. | ▌ ✓ William Simonton (Whig) 56.7%; ▌Valentine Hummel (Democratic) 43.3% |
| Pennsylvania 11 | James Gerry | Democratic | 1838 | Incumbent re-elected. | ▌ ✓ James Gerry (Democratic) 53.3%; ▌Mathias Smyser (Whig) 46.7% |
| Pennsylvania 12 | James Cooper | Whig | 1838 | Incumbent re-elected. | ▌ ✓ James Cooper (Whig) 55.4%; ▌Daniel Sheffer (Democratic) 44.6% |
| Pennsylvania 13 | William S. Ramsey | Democratic | 1838 | Incumbent re-elected. Incumbent then died October 17, 1840, leading to two special elections; see above. | ▌ ✓ William S. Ramsey (Democratic) 56.2%; ▌S. Dunlap Adair (Whig) 43.8% |
| Pennsylvania 14 | George McCulloch | Democratic | 1839 (special) | Incumbent retired. Whig gain. | ▌ ✓ James Irvin (Whig) 52.4%; ▌Andrew P. Wilson (Democratic) 47.6% |
| Pennsylvania 15 | David Petrikin | Democratic | 1836 | Incumbent retired. Democratic hold. | ▌ ✓ Benjamin A. Bidlack (Democratic) 60.4%; ▌Ebenezer W. Sturdevant (Whig) 39.6% |
| Pennsylvania 16 | Robert H. Hammond | Democratic | 1836 | Incumbent retired. Democratic hold. | ▌ ✓ John Snyder (Democratic) 51.6%; ▌James Morrill (Whig) 48.3% |
| Pennsylvania 17 | Samuel W. Morris | Democratic | 1836 | Incumbent retired. Democratic hold. | ▌ ✓ Davis Dimock Jr. (Democratic) 57.7%; ▌Daniel Searle (Whig) 41.8%; Scattering 0.5% |
| Pennsylvania 18 | Charles Ogle | Anti-Masonic | 1836 | Incumbent re-elected as a Whig. Whig gain. Incumbent then died May 10, 1841, leading to a special election; see above. | ▌ ✓ Charles Ogle (Whig) 56.4%; ▌Joseph Imhoff (Democratic) 43.6% |
| Pennsylvania 19 | Albert G. Marchand | Democratic | 1838 | Incumbent re-elected. | ▌ ✓ Albert G. Marchand (Democratic) 59.5%; ▌John F. Beaver (Whig) 40.5% |
| Pennsylvania 20 | Enos Hook | Democratic | 1838 | Incumbent re-elected. Incumbent then resigned April 18, 1841, leading to a special election; see above. | ▌ ✓ Enos Hook (Democratic) 56.3%; ▌Joshua B. Howell (Whig) 43.7% |
| Pennsylvania 21 | Isaac Leet | Democratic | 1838 | Incumbent lost re-election. Whig gain. | ▌ ✓ Joseph Lawrence (Whig) 52.2%; ▌Isaac Leet (Democratic) 47.8% |
| Pennsylvania 22 | Vacant | | | Rep. Richard Biddle (AM) resigned July 21, 1840. Whig gain. Winner was not elected the same day to finish the current term; see above. | ▌ ✓ William W. Irwin (Whig) 61.4%; ▌William Wilkins (Democratic) 38.6% |
| Pennsylvania 23 | William Beatty | Democratic | 1836 | Incumbent retired. Democratic hold. | ▌ ✓ William Jack (Democratic) 52.5%; ▌Samuel A. Purviance (Whig) 47.5% |
| Pennsylvania 24 | Thomas Henry | Anti-Masonic | 1836 | Incumbent re-elected as a Whig. Whig gain. | ▌ ✓ Thomas Henry (Whig) 56.3%; ▌Nathaniel P. Fetterman (Democratic) 43.2%; ▌William Adair (Unknown) 0.5% |
| Pennsylvania 25 | John Galbraith | Democratic | 1832; 1836 (lost renomination); 1838 | Incumbent retired. Democratic hold. | ▌ ✓ Arnold Plumer (Democratic) 51.0%; ▌William A. Irvine (Whig) 49.0% |

== Rhode Island ==
The election was held April 21, 1841, after the March 4, 1841 beginning of the term, but before the House first convened on May 31, 1841.

| District | Incumbent | | | This race | |
| District | Member | Party | First elected | Results | Candidates |
|---|---|---|---|---|---|
| Rhode Island at-large 2 seats on a general ticket | Joseph L. Tillinghast | Whig | 1837 | Incumbent re-elected. | ▌ ✓ Robert B. Cranston (Whig) 47.9%; ▌ ✓ Joseph L. Tillinghast (Whig) 47.4%; Scattering 4.7% |
| Rhode Island at-large 2 seats on a general ticket | Robert B. Cranston | Whig | 1837 | Incumbent re-elected. | ▌ ✓ Robert B. Cranston (Whig) 47.9%; ▌ ✓ Joseph L. Tillinghast (Whig) 47.4%; Scattering 4.7% |

== South Carolina ==
Elections were held October 12–13, 1840.

| District | Incumbent | | | This race | |
| District | Member | Party | First elected | Results | Candidates |
|---|---|---|---|---|---|
| South Carolina 1 | Isaac E. Holmes | Democratic | 1838 | Incumbent re-elected. | ▌ ✓ Isaac E. Holmes (Democratic) 87.5%; ▌Hugh S. Legaré (Unknown) 12.5% |
| South Carolina 2 | Robert B. Rhett | Democratic | 1836 | Incumbent re-elected. | ▌ ✓ Robert B. Rhett (Democratic); [data missing] |
| South Carolina 3 | John Campbell | Democratic | 1828; 1830 (lost); 1836 | Incumbent re-elected. | ▌ ✓ John Campbell (Democratic); [data missing] |
| South Carolina 4 | Sampson H. Butler | Democratic | 1839 (special) | Incumbent re-elected. | ▌ ✓ Sampson H. Butler (Democratic); [data missing] |
| South Carolina 5 | John K. Griffin | Democratic | 1830 | Incumbent retired. Democratic hold. | ▌ ✓ Patrick C. Caldwell (Democratic) 41.2%; ▌James Irby (Whig) 36.6%; ▌S. Barkley (Democratic) 22.2% |
| South Carolina 6 | Francis W. Pickens | Democratic | 1834 (special) | Incumbent re-elected. | ▌ ✓ Francis W. Pickens (Democratic); [data missing] |
| South Carolina 7 | James Rogers | Democratic | 1834; 1836 (lost); 1838 | Incumbent re-elected. | ▌ ✓ James Rogers (Democratic); [data missing] |
| South Carolina 8 | Waddy Thompson Jr. | Whig | 1835 (special) | Incumbent retired. Whig hold. | ▌ ✓ William Butler (Whig) 46.8%; ▌J. W. Norris (Democratic) 44.2%; ▌J. Powell (Democratic) 9.0% |
| South Carolina 9 | Thomas De Lage Sumter | Democratic | 1839 (special) | Incumbent re-elected. | ▌ ✓ Thomas De Lage Sumter (Democratic); ▌Thomas P. Evans (Whig); [data missing] |

== Tennessee ==
Elections were held May 6, 1841, after the March 4, 1841 beginning of the term, but before the House first convened on May 31, 1841.

| District | Incumbent | | | This race | |
| District | Member | Party | First elected | Results | Candidates |
|---|---|---|---|---|---|
| Tennessee 1 | William B. Carter | Whig | 1835 | Incumbent retired. Whig hold. | ▌ ✓ Thomas D. Arnold (Whig) 90.2%; ▌Robert J. McKinney (Unknown) 5.7%; ▌Jeremiah Jack (Unknown) 4.1% |
| Tennessee 2 | Abraham McClellan | Democratic | 1837 | Incumbent re-elected. | ▌ ✓ Abraham McClellan (Democratic) 53.0%; ▌William T. Senter (Whig) 47.0% |
| Tennessee 3 | Joseph L. Williams | Whig | 1837 | Incumbent re-elected. | ▌ ✓ Joseph L. Williams (Whig) 97.4%; Scattering 2.6% |
| Tennessee 4 | Julius W. Blackwell | Democratic | 1839 | Incumbent lost re-election. Whig gain. | ▌ ✓ Thomas J. Campbell (Whig) 49.3%; ▌Julius W. Blackwell (Democratic) 48.5%; ▌William Stone (Unknown) 2.2% |
| Tennessee 5 | Hopkins L. Turney | Democratic | 1837 | Incumbent re-elected. | ▌ ✓ Hopkins L. Turney (Democratic) 68.0%; ▌John Goodall (Whig) 32.0% |
| Tennessee 6 | William B. Campbell | Whig | 1837 | Incumbent re-elected. | ▌ ✓ William B. Campbell (Whig) 87.5%; ▌Jesse Skein (Unknown) 10.7%; Scattering 1.8% |
| Tennessee 7 | John Bell | Whig | 1827 | Incumbent retired to become Secretary of War. Whig hold. | ▌ ✓ Robert L. Caruthers (Whig) 72.3%; ▌John Hall (Democratic) 27.7% |
| Tennessee 8 | Meredith P. Gentry | Whig | 1839 | Incumbent re-elected. | ▌ ✓ Meredith P. Gentry (Whig) 70.1%; ▌Thomas Hogan (Democratic) 29.9% |
| Tennessee 9 | Harvey M. Watterson | Democratic | 1839 | Incumbent re-elected. | ▌ ✓ Harvey M. Watterson (Democratic) 54.8%; ▌Terry H. Cahal (Whig) 45.2% |
| Tennessee 10 | Aaron V. Brown | Democratic | 1839 | Incumbent re-elected. | ▌ ✓ Aaron V. Brown (Democratic) 81.0%; ▌Ebenezer J. Shields (Whig) 15.6%; Scattering 3.4% |
| Tennessee 11 | Cave Johnson | Democratic | 1829; 1837 (lost); 1839 | Incumbent re-elected. | ▌ ✓ Cave Johnson (Democratic) 74.3%; ▌N. H. Allen (Whig) 25.7% |
| Tennessee 12 | John W. Crockett | Whig | 1837 | Incumbent retired to become Attorney General for the 9th district. Whig hold. | ▌ ✓ Milton Brown (Whig) 61.2%; ▌Stephen C. Davatt (Democratic) 38.8% |
| Tennessee 13 | Kit Williams | Whig | 1837 | Incumbent re-elected. | ▌ ✓ Kit Williams (Whig) 57.3%; ▌Levin H. Coe (Democratic) 42.7% |

== Vermont ==
Elections were held September 6, 1840

| District | Incumbent | | | This race | |
| District | Member | Party | First elected | Results | Candidates |
|---|---|---|---|---|---|
| Vermont 1 | Hiland Hall | Whig | 1833 (special) | Incumbent re-elected. | ▌ ✓ Hiland Hall (Whig) 62.9%; ▌Daniel Kellogg (Democratic) 37.1% |
| Vermont 2 | William Slade | Whig | 1831 (special) | Incumbent re-elected. | ▌ ✓ William Slade (Whig) 68.9%; ▌Charles Linsley (Democratic) 31.1% |
| Vermont 3 | Horace Everett | Whig | 1828 | Incumbent re-elected. | ▌ ✓ Horace Everett (Whig) 59.3%; ▌Truman B. Ransom (Democratic) 39.7%; ▌Andre Tracy (Unknown) 1.0% |
| Vermont 4 | John Smith | Democratic | 1838 | Incumbent lost re-election. Whig gain. | ▌ ✓ Augustus Young (Whig) 56.2%; ▌John Smith (Democratic) 43.8% |
| Vermont 5 | Isaac Fletcher | Democratic | 1836 | Incumbent lost re-election. Whig gain. | ▌ ✓ John Mattocks (Whig) 51.1%; ▌Isaac Fletcher (Democratic) 48.9% |

== Virginia ==
Elections were held April 23, 1841, after the March 4, 1841 beginning of the term, but before the House first convened on May 31, 1841.

| District | Incumbent | | | This race | |
| District | Member | Party | First elected | Results | Candidates |
|---|---|---|---|---|---|
| Virginia 1 | Francis Mallory | Whig | 1837; 1839 (lost); 1840 (special) | Incumbent re-elected. | ▌ ✓ Francis Mallory (Whig); ▌James Walters (Unknown); ▌Archibald Atkinson (Unknown); [data missing] |
| Virginia 2 | Francis E. Rives | Democratic | 1837 | Incumbent retired. Democratic hold. | ▌ ✓ George B. Cary (Democratic); ▌[FNU] Collier (Unknown); [data missing] |
| Virginia 3 | John W. Jones | Democratic | 1835 | Incumbent re-elected. | ▌ ✓ John W. Jones (Democratic); ▌Junius E. Leigh (Unknown); ▌Thomas Miller (Unknown); [data missing] |
| Virginia 4 | George Dromgoole | Democratic | 1835 | Incumbent retired. Democratic hold. | ▌ ✓ William Goode (Democratic); ▌R. H. Baptist (Unknown); ▌[FNU] Marshall (Unknown); [data missing] |
| Virginia 5 | John Hill | Whig | 1839 | Incumbent lost re-election. Democratic gain. | ▌ ✓ Edmund W. Hubard (Democratic) 50.4%; ▌John Hill (Whig) 49.6% |
| Virginia 6 | Walter Coles | Democratic | 1835 | Incumbent re-elected. | ▌ ✓ Walter Coles (Democratic) 55.9%; ▌Vincent Witcher (Whig) 44.1% |
| Virginia 7 | William L. Goggin | Whig | 1839 | Incumbent re-elected. | ▌ ✓ William L. Goggin (Whig); ▌Archibald Stuart (Democratic); [data missing] |
| Virginia 8 | Henry A. Wise | Whig | 1833 | Incumbent re-elected. | ▌ ✓ Henry A. Wise (Whig); ▌William Todd (Democratic); [data missing] |
| Virginia 9 | Robert M. T. Hunter | Whig | 1837 | Incumbent re-elected as an independent. Independent gain. | ▌ ✓ Robert M. T. Hunter (Independent) 53.4%; ▌[FNU] Corbin (Whig) 36.2%; ▌[FNU] Braxton (Democratic) 10.4% |
| Virginia 10 | John Taliaferro | Whig | 1801; 1803 (retired); 1811 (won contest); 1813 (lost); 1824 (special); 1831 (lost); 1835 | Incumbent re-elected. | ▌ ✓ John Taliaferro (Whig) 54.2%; ▌Robert O. Grayson (Democratic) 45.8% |
| Virginia 11 | John Botts | Whig | 1839 | Incumbent re-elected. | ▌ ✓ John Botts (Whig); ▌[FNU] Goodall (Unknown); [data missing] |
| Virginia 12 | James Garland | Conservative | 1835 | Incumbent lost re-election. Whig gain. | ▌ ✓ Thomas W. Gilmer (Whig) 51.6%; ▌James Garland (Conservative) 42.0%; ▌[FNU] Holladay (Unknown) 6.4% |
| Virginia 13 | Linn Banks | Democratic | 1838 (special) | Incumbent re-elected. Incumbent then resigned November 8, 1841, leading to a special election; see above. | ▌ ✓ Linn Banks (Democratic); ▌William Smith (Democratic); [data missing] |
| Virginia 14 | William M. McCarty | Whig | 1840 (special | Incumbent retired. Whig hold. | ▌ ✓ Cuthbert Powell (Whig) 62.9%; ▌B. Shreve (Democratic) 37.1% |
| Virginia 15 | William Lucas | Democratic | 1839 | Incumbent lost re-election. Whig gain. | ▌ ✓ Richard W. Barton (Whig); ▌William Lucas (Democratic); [data missing] |
| Virginia 16 | Green B. Samuels | Democratic | 1839 | Incumbent retired. Democratic hold. | ▌ ✓ William A. Harris (Democratic) 36.8%; ▌Samuel C. Williams (Democratic) 30.1%; ▌James M. H. Beale (Democratic) 19.5%; ▌Gabriel T. Barbee (Unknown) 13.6% |
| Virginia 17 | Robert Craig | Democratic | 1829; 1833 (lost); 1835 | Incumbent retired. Whig gain. | ▌ ✓ Alexander H. H. Stuart (Whig); ▌James McDowell Jr. (Democratic); [data missing] |
| Virginia 18 | George W. Hopkins | Conservative | 1835 | Incumbent re-elected as a Democrat. Democratic gain. | ▌ ✓ George W. Hopkins (Democratic); ▌J. Watson (Whig); [data missing] |
| Virginia 19 | Andrew Beirne | Democratic | 1837 | Incumbent retired. Whig gain. | ▌ ✓ George W. Summers (Whig); ▌Augustus Caperton (Unknown); Scattering; [data missing] |
| Virginia 20 | Joseph Johnson | Democratic | 1823; 1827 (lost); 1833 (special); 1833 (retired); 1835 | Incumbent retired. Democratic hold. | ▌ ✓ Samuel L. Hays (Democratic) 59.2%; ▌Augustine J. Smith (Whig) 40.8% |
| Virginia 21 | Lewis Steenrod | Democratic | 1839 | Incumbent re-elected. | ▌ ✓ Lewis Steenrod (Democratic); [data missing] |

== Wisconsin Territory ==
See Non-voting delegates, below.

== Non-voting delegates ==
=== 26th Congress ===
| District | Incumbent | | | This race | |
| District | Member | Party | First elected | Results | Candidates |
|---|---|---|---|---|---|
| Iowa Territory at-large | William W. Chapman | Democratic | 1838 | Incumbent's term expired by law. New delegate elected in 1840. Democratic hold. | ▌ ✓ Augustus C. Dodge (Democratic); ▌Alfred Rich (Whig) (615-vote margin) |

=== 27th Congress ===
| District | Incumbent | | | This race | |
| District | Member | Party | First elected | Results | Candidates |
|---|---|---|---|---|---|
| Florida Territory at-large | Charles Downing | Democratic | 1836 | Incumbent retired. New delegate elected in 1840. Democratic hold. | ▌ ✓ David L. Yulee (Democratic); [data missing] |
| Iowa Territory at-large | Augustus C. Dodge | Democratic | 1840 | Incumbent re-elected August 6, 1841. | ▌ ✓ Augustus C. Dodge (Democratic) 4838 votes; ▌Alfred Rich (Whig) 4315 votes |
| Wisconsin Territory at-large | James D. Doty | Democratic | 1838 | Incumbent retired. New delegate elected in 1840. Democratic hold. | ▌ ✓ Henry Dodge (Democratic); [data missing] |

== See also ==
- 1840 United States elections
  - List of United States House of Representatives elections (1824–1854)
  - 1840 United States presidential election
  - 1840–41 United States Senate elections
- 26th United States Congress
- 27th United States Congress

== Bibliography ==
- Dubin, Michael J. (March 1, 1998). United States Congressional Elections, 1788-1997: The Official Results of the Elections of the 1st Through 105th Congresses. McFarland and Company. ISBN 978-0786402830.
- Martis, Kenneth C. (January 1, 1989). The Historical Atlas of Political Parties in the United States Congress, 1789-1989. Macmillan Publishing Company. ISBN 978-0029201701.
- Moore, John L., ed. (1994). Congressional Quarterly's Guide to U.S. Elections (Third ed.). Congressional Quarterly Inc. ISBN 978-0871879967.
- "Party Divisions of the House of Representatives* 1789–Present". Office of the Historian, House of United States House of Representatives.
