= List of United States representatives in the 27th Congress =

This is a complete list of United States representatives during the 27th United States Congress listed by seniority.

As a historical article, the districts and party affiliations listed reflect those during the 27th Congress (March 4, 1841 – March 3, 1843). Seats and party affiliations on similar lists for other congresses will be different for certain members.

Seniority depends on the date on which members were sworn into office. Since many members are sworn in on the same day, subsequent ranking is based on previous congressional service of the individual and then by alphabetical order by the last name of the representative.

Committee chairmanship in the House is often associated with seniority. However, party leadership is typically not associated with seniority.

Note: The "*" indicates that the representative/delegate may have served one or more non-consecutive terms while in the House of Representatives of the United States Congress.

== U.S. House seniority list ==
U.S. House seniority
Rank	Representative	Party	District	Seniority date (previous service, if any)	No. of term(s)	Notes
1	Lewis Williams	W	NC-13	March 4, 1815	14th term	Dean of the House; Died on February 23, 1842.
2	Horace Everett	W	VT-03	March 4, 1829	7th term	Dean of the House after Williams died. Left the House in 1843.
3	Dixon H. Lewis	D	AL	March 4, 1829	7th term	
4	John Quincy Adams	W	MA-12	March 4, 1831	6th term	
5	George N. Briggs	W	MA-07	March 4, 1831	6th term	Left the House in 1843.
6	James Iver McKay	D	NC-05	March 4, 1831	6th term	
7	William Slade	W	VT-02	November 1, 1831	6th term	Left the House in 1843.
8	Hiland Hall	W	VT-01	January 1, 1833	6th term	Left the House in 1843.
9	Zadok Casey	D	IL-02	March 4, 1833	5th term	Left the House in 1843.
10	Edmund Deberry	W	NC-07	March 4, 1833; Previous service, 1829–1831.	6th term*	
11	James Graham	D	NC-12	March 4, 1833	5th term	Left the House in 1843.
12	Henry A. Wise	W	VA-08	March 4, 1833	5th term	
13	Levi Lincoln Jr.	W	MA-05	February 17, 1834	5th term	Resigned on March 16, 1841.
14	Francis Wilkinson Pickens	D	SC-05	December 8, 1834	5th term	Left the House in 1843.
15	William B. Calhoun	W	MA-08	March 4, 1835	4th term	Left the House in 1843.
16	Reuben Chapman	D	AL	March 4, 1835	4th term	
17	Walter Coles	D	VA-06	March 4, 1835	4th term	
18	Caleb Cushing	W	MA-03	March 4, 1835	4th term	Left the House in 1843.
19	George W. Hopkins	D	VA-18	March 4, 1835	4th term	
20	John W. Jones	D	VA-03	March 4, 1835	4th term	
21	Samson Mason	W	OH-10	March 4, 1835	4th term	Left the House in 1843.
22	John Taliaferro	W	VA-10	March 4, 1835; Previous service, 1801–1803, 1811–1813 and 1824–1831.	10th term***	Left the House in 1843.
23	Joseph R. Underwood	W	KY-03	March 4, 1835	4th term	Left the House in 1843.
24	John White	W	KY-09	March 4, 1835	4th term	
25	William Crosby Dawson	W	GA	November 7, 1836	4th term	Resigned on November 13, 1841.
26	Charles G. Atherton	D	NH	March 4, 1837	3rd term	Left the House in 1843.
27	John Campbell	D	SC-03	March 4, 1837; Previous service, 1829–1831.	4th term*	
28	William B. Campbell	W	TN-06	March 4, 1837	3rd term	Left the House in 1843.
29	John C. Clark	W	NY-21	March 4, 1837; Previous service, 1827–1829.	4th term*	Left the House in 1843.
30	Robert B. Cranston	W	RI	March 4, 1837	3rd term	Left the House in 1843.
31	Millard Fillmore	W	NY-32	March 4, 1837; Previous service, 1833–1835.	4th term*	Left the House in 1843.
32	Patrick Gaines Goode	W	OH-03	March 4, 1837	3rd term	Left the House in 1843.
33	William S. Hastings	W	MA-09	March 4, 1837	3rd term	Died on June 17, 1842.
34	Thomas Henry	W	PA-24	March 4, 1837	3rd term	Left the House in 1843.
35	Robert M. T. Hunter	W	VA-09	March 4, 1837	3rd term	Speaker of the House; Left the House in 1843.
36	William C. Johnson	W	MD-05	March 4, 1837; Previous service, 1833–1835.	4th term*	Left the House in 1843.
37	Abraham McClellan	D	TN-02	March 4, 1837	3rd term	Left the House in 1843.
38	John Miller	D	MO	March 4, 1837	3rd term	Left the House in 1843.
39	Calvary Morris	W	OH-06	March 4, 1837	3rd term	Left the House in 1843.
40	Charles Ogle	W	PA-18	March 4, 1837	3rd term	Died on May 10, 1841.
41	William Parmenter	D	MA-04	March 4, 1837	3rd term	
42	John Pope	W	KY-07	March 4, 1837	3rd term	Left the House in 1843.
43	Joseph Fitz Randolph	W	NJ	March 4, 1837	3rd term	Left the House in 1843.
44	Robert Rhett	D	SC-02	March 4, 1837	3rd term	
45	Joseph Ridgway	W	OH-08	March 4, 1837	3rd term	Left the House in 1843.
46	John Sergeant	W	PA-02	March 4, 1837; Previous service, 1815–1823 and 1828–1829.	8th term**	Resigned on September 15, 1841.
47	Edward Stanly	W	NC-03	March 4, 1837	3rd term	Left the House in 1843.
48	Joseph L. Tillinghast	W	RI	March 4, 1837	3rd term	Left the House in 1843.
49	George Washington Toland	W	PA-02	March 4, 1837	3rd term	Left the House in 1843.
50	Hopkins L. Turney	D	TN-05	March 4, 1837	3rd term	Left the House in 1843.
51	Christopher Harris Williams	W	TN-13	March 4, 1837	3rd term	Left the House in 1843.
52	Joseph Lanier Williams	W	TN-03	March 4, 1837	3rd term	Left the House in 1843.
53	George May Keim	D	PA-09	March 17, 1838	3rd term	Left the House in 1843.
54	Linn Banks	D	VA-13	April 28, 1838	3rd term	Resigned on December 6, 1841.
55	Joshua R. Giddings	W	OH-16	December 3, 1838	3rd term	Resigned on March 22, 1842. Return to the House on December 5, 1842.
56	Leverett Saltonstall I	W	MA-02	December 5, 1838	3rd term	Left the House in 1843.
57	Julius Caesar Alford	W	GA	March 4, 1839; Previous service, 1837.	3rd term*	Resigned on October 1, 1841.
58	Landaff Andrews	W	KY-11	March 4, 1839	2nd term	Left the House in 1843.
59	Daniel D. Barnard	W	NY-10	March 4, 1839; Previous service, 1827–1829.	3rd term*	
60	John Botts	W	VA-11	March 4, 1839	2nd term	Left the House in 1843.
61	Linn Boyd	D	KY-01	March 4, 1839; Previous service, 1835–1837.	3rd term*	
62	David P. Brewster	D	NY-17	March 4, 1839	2nd term	Left the House in 1843.
63	John H. Brockway	W	CT-06	March 4, 1839	2nd term	Left the House in 1843.
64	Aaron V. Brown	D	TN-10	March 4, 1839	2nd term	
65	Edmund Burke	D	NH	March 4, 1839	2nd term	
66	Sampson H. Butler	D	SC-04	March 4, 1839	2nd term	Resigned on September 27, 1842.
67	William Orlando Butler	D	KY-13	March 4, 1839	2nd term	Left the House in 1843.
68	Thomas C. Chittenden	W	NY-18	March 4, 1839	2nd term	Left the House in 1843.
69	Nathan Clifford	D	ME-01	March 4, 1839	2nd term	Left the House in 1843.
70	James Cooper	W	PA-12	March 4, 1839	2nd term	Left the House in 1843.
71	Edward Cross	D	AR	March 4, 1839	2nd term	
72	Garrett Davis	W	KY-12	March 4, 1839	2nd term	
73	William Doan	D	OH-05	March 4, 1839	2nd term	Left the House in 1843.
74	Andrew W. Doig	D	NY-16	March 4, 1839	2nd term	Left the House in 1843.
75	Ira Allen Eastman	D	NH	March 4, 1839	2nd term	Left the House in 1843.
76	John Edwards	W	PA-04	March 4, 1839	2nd term	Left the House in 1843.
77	John G. Floyd	D	NY-17	March 4, 1839	2nd term	Left the House in 1843.
78	Joseph Fornance	D	PA-05	March 4, 1839	2nd term	Left the House in 1843.
79	Seth M. Gates	W	NY-29	March 4, 1839	2nd term	Left the House in 1843.
80	Meredith P. Gentry	W	TN-08	March 4, 1839	2nd term	Left the House in 1843.
81	James Gerry	W	PA-11	March 4, 1839	2nd term	Left the House in 1843.
82	Francis Granger	W	NY-26	March 4, 1839; Previous service, 1835–1837.	3rd term*	Resigned on March 5, 1841.
83	Willis Green	W	KY-06	March 4, 1839	2nd term	
84	William L. Goggin	W	VA-07	March 4, 1839	2nd term	Left the House in 1843.
85	Richard W. Habersham	W	GA	March 4, 1839	2nd term	Died on December 2, 1842.
86	John Hastings	D	OH-17	March 4, 1839	2nd term	Left the House in 1843.
87	Enos Hook	D	PA-20	March 4, 1839	2nd term	Resigned on April 18, 1841.
88	Hiram P. Hunt	W	NY-09	March 4, 1839; Previous service, 1835–1837.	3rd term*	Left the House in 1843.
89	Isaac E. Holmes	D	SC-01	March 4, 1839	2nd term	
90	Francis James	W	PA-04	March 4, 1839	2nd term	Left the House in 1843.
91	Cave Johnson	D	TN-11	March 4, 1839; Previous service, 1829–1837.	6th term*	
92	Thomas Butler King	W	GA	March 4, 1839	2nd term	Left the House in 1843.
93	Joshua A. Lowell	D	ME-07	March 4, 1839	2nd term	Left the House in 1843.
94	Albert Gallatin Marchand	D	PA-19	March 4, 1839	2nd term	Left the House in 1843.
95	William Medill	D	OH-09	March 4, 1839	2nd term	Left the House in 1843.
96	Christopher Morgan	W	NY-24	March 4, 1839	2nd term	Left the House in 1843.
97	Peter Newhard	D	PA-08	March 4, 1839	2nd term	Left the House in 1843.
98	Eugenius Aristides Nisbet	W	GA	March 4, 1839	2nd term	Resigned on October 12, 1841.
99	Thomas Burr Osborne	W	CT-04	March 4, 1839	2nd term	Left the House in 1843.
100	George H. Proffit	W	IN-01	March 4, 1839	2nd term	Left the House in 1843.
101	Benjamin Randall	W	ME-03	March 4, 1839	2nd term	Left the House in 1843.
102	Kenneth Rayner	W	NC-01	March 4, 1839	2nd term	
103	John Reynolds	D	IL-01	March 4, 1839; Previous service, 1834–1837.	4th term*	Left the House in 1843.
104	James Rogers	D	SC-07	March 4, 1839; Previous service, 1835–1837.	3rd term*	Left the House in 1843.
105	Tristram Shaw	D	NH	March 4, 1839	2nd term	Left the House in 1843.
106	William Simonton	W	PA-10	March 4, 1839	2nd term	Left the House in 1843.
107	Truman Smith	W	CT-05	March 4, 1839	2nd term	Left the House in 1843.
108	Thomas De Lage Sumter	D	SC-08	March 4, 1839	2nd term	Left the House in 1843.
109	George Sweeny	D	OH-14	March 4, 1839	2nd term	Left the House in 1843.
110	Lewis Steenrod	D	VA-21	March 4, 1839	2nd term	
111	John T. Stuart	W	IL-03	March 4, 1839	2nd term	Left the House in 1843.
112	Jacob Thompson	D	MS	March 4, 1839	2nd term	
113	Philip Triplett	W	KY-02	March 4, 1839	2nd term	Left the House in 1843.
114	Joseph Trumbull	W	CT-01	March 4, 1839; Previous service, 1834–1835.	3rd term*	Left the House in 1843.
115	Lott Warren	W	GA	March 4, 1839	2nd term	Left the House in 1843.
116	Harvey Magee Watterson	D	TN-09	March 4, 1839	2nd term	Left the House in 1843.
117	John B. Weller	D	OH-02	March 4, 1839	2nd term	
118	Edward Douglass White, Sr.	W	LA-01	March 4, 1839; Previous service, 1829–1834.	5th term*	Left the House in 1843.
119	Thomas W. Williams	W	CT-03	March 4, 1839	2nd term	Left the House in 1843.
120	Osmyn Baker	W	MA-06	January 14, 1840	2nd term	
121	Henry S. Lane	W	IN-07	August 3, 1840	2nd term	Left the House in 1843.
122	Jeremiah Morrow	W	OH-04	October 13, 1840; Previous service, 1803–1813.	8th term*	Left the House in 1843.
123	Robert Charles Winthrop	W	MA-01	November 9, 1840	2nd term	Resigned on May 25, 1842. Returned to the House on November 29, 1842.
124	William Whiting Boardman	W	CT-02	December 7, 1840	2nd term	Left the House in 1843.
125	John B. Thompson	W	KY-05	December 7, 1840	2nd term	Left the House in 1843.
126	John Moore	W	LA-03	December 17, 1840	2nd term	Left the House in 1843.
127	Francis Mallory	W	VA-01	December 28, 1840; Previous service, 1837–1839.	3rd term*	Left the House in 1843.
128	Elisha Hunt Allen	W	ME-08	March 4, 1841	1st term	Left the House in 1843.
129	Sherlock James Andrews	W	OH-15	March 4, 1841	1st term	Left the House in 1843.
130	Thomas Dickens Arnold	W	TN-01	March 4, 1841; Previous service, 1831–1833.	2nd term*	Left the House in 1843.
131	Archibald H. Arrington	D	NC-06	March 4, 1841	1st term	
132	John Bancker Aycrigg	W	NJ	March 4, 1841; Previous service, 1837–1839.	2nd term*	Left the House in 1843.
133	Alfred Babcock	W	NY-33	March 4, 1841	1st term	Left the House in 1843.
134	Richard W. Barton	W	VA-15	March 4, 1841	1st term	Left the House in 1843.
135	Benjamin A. Bidlack	D	PA-15	March 4, 1841	1st term	
136	Victory Birdseye	W	NY-23	March 4, 1841; Previous service, 1815–1817.	2nd term*	Left the House in 1843.
137	Bernard Blair	W	NY-12	March 4, 1841	1st term	Left the House in 1843.
138	Nathaniel B. Borden	W	MA-10	March 4, 1841; Previous service, 1835–1839.	3rd term*	Left the House in 1843.
139	Samuel S. Bowne	D	NY-19	March 4, 1841	1st term	Left the House in 1843.
140	Charles Brown	D	PA-01	March 4, 1841	1st term	Left the House in 1843.
141	Jeremiah Brown	W	PA-04	March 4, 1841	1st term	
142	Milton Brown	W	TN-12	March 4, 1841	1st term	
143	Barker Burnell	W	MA-11	March 4, 1841	1st term	
144	William Butler	W	SC-06	March 4, 1841	1st term	Left the House in 1843.
145	Greene Washington Caldwell	D	NC-11	March 4, 1841	1st term	Left the House in 1843.
146	Patrick C. Caldwell	D	SC-09	March 4, 1841	1st term	Left the House in 1843.
147	Thomas Jefferson Campbell	W	TN-04	March 4, 1841	1st term	Left the House in 1843.
148	Robert L. Caruthers	W	TN-07	March 4, 1841	1st term	Left the House in 1843.
149	George B. Cary	D	VA-02	March 4, 1841	1st term	Left the House in 1843.
150	Timothy Childs	W	NY-28	March 4, 1841; Previous service, 1829–1831 and 1835–1839.	4th term**	Left the House in 1843.
151	Staley N. Clarke	W	NY-31	March 4, 1841	1st term	Left the House in 1843.
152	James G. Clinton	D	NY-06	March 4, 1841	1st term	
153	Benjamin S. Cowen	W	OH-11	March 4, 1841	1st term	Left the House in 1843.
154	James H. Cravens	W	IN-04	March 4, 1841	1st term	Left the House in 1843.
155	John Reeves Jones Daniel	D	NC-02	March 4, 1841	1st term	
156	Richard D. Davis	D	NY-05	March 4, 1841	1st term	
157	John B. Dawson	D	LA-02	March 4, 1841	1st term	
158	Ezra Dean	D	OH-18	March 4, 1841	1st term	
159	Davis Dimock Jr.	D	PA-17	March 4, 1841	1st term	Died on January 13, 1842.
160	John C. Edwards	D	MO	March 4, 1841	1st term	Left the House in 1843.
161	Joseph Egbert	D	NY-02	March 4, 1841	1st term	Left the House in 1843.
162	Charles G. Ferris	D	NY-03	March 4, 1841; Previous service, 1834–1835.	2nd term*	Left the House in 1843.
163	William P. Fessenden	W	ME-02	March 4, 1841	1st term	Left the House in 1843.
164	Charles A. Floyd	D	NY-01	March 4, 1841	1st term	Left the House in 1843.
165	A. Lawrence Foster	W	NY-23	March 4, 1841	1st term	Left the House in 1843.
166	Thomas Flournoy Foster	W	GA	March 4, 1841; Previous service, 1829–1835.	4th term*	Left the House in 1843.
167	Roger Lawson Gamble	W	GA	March 4, 1841; Previous service, 1833–1835.	2nd term*	Left the House in 1843.
168	Thomas Walker Gilmer	W	VA-12	March 4, 1841	1st term	
169	William Goode	D	VA-04	March 4, 1841	1st term	Left the House in 1843.
170	Samuel Gordon	D	NY-20	March 4, 1841	1st term	Left the House in 1843.
171	Amos Gustine	D	PA-13	March 4, 1841	1st term	Left the House in 1843.
172	William M. Gwin	D	MS	March 4, 1841	1st term	Left the House in 1843.
173	William Halstead	W	NJ	March 4, 1841; Previous service, 1837–1839.	2nd term*	Left the House in 1843.
174	William Alexander Harris	D	VA-16	March 4, 1841	1st term	Left the House in 1843.
175	Samuel Lewis Hays	D	VA-20	March 4, 1841	1st term	Left the House in 1843.
176	Jacob Houck Jr.	D	NY-08	March 4, 1841	1st term	Left the House in 1843.
177	George S. Houston	D	AL	March 4, 1841	1st term	
178	Jacob M. Howard	W	MI	March 4, 1841	1st term	Left the House in 1843.
179	Edmund Hubard	D	VA-05	March 4, 1841	1st term	
180	Charles J. Ingersoll	D	PA-03	March 4, 1841; Previous service, 1813–1815.	2nd term*	
181	James Irvin	W	PA-14	March 4, 1841	1st term	
182	William W. Irwin	W	PA-22	March 4, 1841	1st term	Left the House in 1843.
183	William Jack	D	PA-23	March 4, 1841	1st term	Left the House in 1843.
184	Isaac Dashiell Jones	W	MD-01	March 4, 1841	1st term	Left the House in 1843.
185	Andrew Kennedy	D	IN-05	March 4, 1841	1st term	
186	John P. Kennedy	W	MD-04	March 4, 1841; Previous service, 1838–1839.	2nd term*	
187	Joseph Lawrence	W	PA-21	March 4, 1841; Previous service, 1825–1829.	3rd term*	Died on April 17, 1842.
188	Archibald L. Linn	W	NY-11	March 4, 1841	1st term	Left the House in 1843.
189	Nathaniel Littlefield	D	ME-05	March 4, 1841	1st term	Left the House in 1843.
190	Alfred Marshall	D	ME-06	March 4, 1841	1st term	Left the House in 1843.
191	Thomas Francis Marshall	W	KY-10	March 4, 1841	1st term	Left the House in 1843.
192	John Thomson Mason Jr.	D	MD-06	March 4, 1841	1st term	Left the House in 1843.
193	James Mathews	D	OH-13	March 4, 1841	1st term	
194	Joshua Mathiot	W	OH-12	March 4, 1841	1st term	Left the House in 1843.
195	John Mattocks	W	VT-05	March 4, 1841; Previous service, 1821–1823 and 1825–1827.	3rd term**	Left the House in 1843.
196	John Patterson Bryan Maxwell	W	NJ	March 4, 1841; Previous service, 1837–1839.	2nd term*	Left the House in 1843.
197	John Maynard	W	NY-25	March 4, 1841; Previous service, 1827–1829.	2nd term*	Left the House in 1843.
198	John McKeon	D	NY-03	March 4, 1841; Previous service, 1835–1837.	2nd term*	Left the House in 1843.
199	Robert McClellan	D	NY-08	March 4, 1841; Previous service, 1837–1839.	2nd term*	Left the House in 1843.
200	James Archibald Meriwether	W	GA	March 4, 1841	1st term	Left the House in 1843.
201	William M. Oliver	D	NY-27	March 4, 1841	1st term	Left the House in 1843.
202	Bryan Owsley	W	KY-04	March 4, 1841	1st term	Left the House in 1843.
203	Samuel Partridge	D	NY-22	March 4, 1841	1st term	Left the House in 1843.
204	William W. Payne	D	AL	March 4, 1841	1st term	
205	James Pearce	W	MD-02	March 4, 1841; Previous service, 1835–1839.	3rd term*	Left the House in 1843.
206	Nathanael G. Pendleton	W	OH-01	March 4, 1841	1st term	Left the House in 1843.
207	Cuthbert Powell	W	VA-14	March 4, 1841	1st term	Left the House in 1843.
208	Arnold Plumer	D	PA-25	March 4, 1841; Previous service, 1837–1839.	2nd term*	Left the House in 1843.
209	Robert Ramsey	W	PA-06	March 4, 1841; Previous service, 1833–1835.	2nd term*	Left the House in 1843.
210	Alexander Randall	W	MD-04	March 4, 1841	1st term	Left the House in 1843.
211	John Randall Reding	D	NH	March 4, 1841	1st term	
212	Abraham Rencher	W	NC-10	March 4, 1841; Previous service, 1829–1839.	6th term*	Left the House in 1843.
213	Lewis Riggs	D	NY-22	March 4, 1841	1st term	Left the House in 1843.
214	George B. Rodney	W	DE	March 4, 1841	1st term	
215	James I. Roosevelt	D	NY-03	March 4, 1841	1st term	Left the House in 1843.
216	William Russell	W	OH-07	March 4, 1841; Previous service, 1827–1833.	4th term*	Left the House in 1843.
217	John Sanford	D	NY-15	March 4, 1841	1st term	Left the House in 1843.
218	Romulus Mitchell Saunders	D	NC-08	March 4, 1841; Previous service, 1821–1827.	4th term*	
219	Augustine Henry Shepperd	W	NC-09	March 4, 1841; Previous service, 1827–1839.	7th term*	Left the House in 1843.
220	Benjamin G. Shields	D	AL	March 4, 1841	1st term	Left the House in 1843.
221	John Snyder	D	PA-16	March 4, 1841	1st term	Left the House in 1843.
222	Augustus Rhodes Sollers	W	MD-07	March 4, 1841	1st term	Left the House in 1843.
223	James Sprigg	W	KY-08	March 4, 1841	1st term	Left the House in 1843.
224	Samuel Stokely	W	OH-19	March 4, 1841	1st term	Left the House in 1843.
225	Charles C. Stratton	W	NJ	March 4, 1841; Previous service, 1837–1839.	2nd term*	Left the House in 1843.
226	Alexander Hugh Holmes Stuart	W	VA-17	March 4, 1841	1st term	Left the House in 1843.
227	George W. Summers	W	VA-19	March 4, 1841	1st term	
228	Richard W. Thompson	W	IN-02	March 4, 1841	1st term	Left the House in 1843.
229	Thomas A. Tomlinson	W	NY-13	March 4, 1841	1st term	Left the House in 1843.
230	John Van Buren	D	NY-07	March 4, 1841	1st term	Left the House in 1843.
231	Henry Bell Van Rensselaer	W	NY-14	March 4, 1841	1st term	Left the House in 1843.
232	David Wallace	W	IN-06	March 4, 1841	1st term	Left the House in 1843.
233	Aaron Ward	D	NY-04	March 4, 1841; Previous service, 1825–1829 and 1831–1837.	6th term**	Left the House in 1843.
234	William Henry Washington	W	NC-04	March 4, 1841	1st term	Left the House in 1843.
235	John Westbrook	D	PA-07	March 4, 1841	1st term	Left the House in 1843.
236	Joseph L. White	W	IN-03	March 4, 1841	1st term	Left the House in 1843.
237	James W. Williams	D	MD-03	March 4, 1841	1st term	Died on December 2, 1842.
238	Fernando Wood	D	NY-03	March 4, 1841	1st term	Left the House in 1843.
239	Thomas Jones Yorke	W	NJ	March 4, 1841; Previous service, 1837–1839.	2nd term*	Left the House in 1843.
240	Augustus Young	W	VT-04	March 4, 1841	1st term	Left the House in 1843.
241	John Young	W	NY-30	March 4, 1841; Previous service, 1836–1837.	2nd term*	Left the House in 1843.
	Charles Hudson	W	MA-05	May 3, 1841	1st term	
	John Greig	W	NY-26	May 21, 1841	1st term	Resigned on September 25, 1841.
	Henry White Beeson	D	PA-20	May 31, 1841	1st term	Left the House in 1843.
	David Bronson	W	ME-04	May 31, 1841	1st term	Left the House in 1843.
	Henry Black	W	PA-18	June 28, 1841	1st term	Died on November 28, 1841.
	Joseph R. Ingersoll	W	PA-02	October 12, 1841; Previous service, 1835–1837.	2nd term*	
	Francis Granger	W	NY-26	November 27, 1841; Previous service, 1835–1837 and 1839–1841.	4th term**	Left the House in 1843.
	William Smith	D	VA-13	December 6, 1841	1st term	Left the House in 1843.
	James McPherson Russell	W	PA-18	December 21, 1841	1st term	Left the House in 1843.
	Edward J. Black	W	GA	January 3, 1842; Previous service, 1839–1841.	2nd term*	
	Walter T. Colquitt	D	GA	January 3, 1842; Previous service, 1839–1840.	2nd term*	Left the House in 1843.
	Mark Anthony Cooper	W	GA	January 3, 1842; Previous service, 1839–1841.	2nd term*	
	Almon H. Read	D	PA-17	March 18, 1842	1st term	
	Anderson Mitchell	W	NC-13	April 27, 1842	1st term	Left the House in 1843.
	Thomas McKean Thompson McKennan	W	PA-21	May 30, 1842; Previous service, 1831–1839.	5th term*	Left the House in 1843.
	Nathan Appleton	W	MA-01	June 9, 1842; Previous service, 1831–1833.	2nd term*	Resigned on September 28, 1842.
	Samuel W. Trotti	D	SC-04	December 17, 1842	1st term	Left the House in 1843.
	Charles S. Sewall	D	MD-03	January 2, 1843; Previous service, 1832–1833.	2nd term*	Left the House in 1843.
	George W. Crawford	W	GA	January 7, 1843	1st term	Left the House in 1843.

== Delegates ==
Rank	Delegate	Party	District	Seniority date (previous service, if any)	No. of term(s)	Notes
1	Augustus C. Dodge	D	IA	October 28, 1840	2nd term	
2	Henry Dodge	D	WI	March 4, 1841	1st term	
3	David Levy Yulee	D	FL	March 4, 1841	1st term	

== See also ==
- 27th United States Congress
- List of United States congressional districts
- List of United States senators in the 27th Congress
