= Cartland =

Cartland may refer to:

== People ==
- Barbara Cartland (1901–2000), English author, known for her numerous romance novels
- George Cartland (1912–2008), the only deputy-governor of Uganda; later Vice-Chancellor of the University of Tasmania
- Michael David Cartland (born 1945), the Secretary for Financial Services of Hong Kong during British rule in the 1990s
- Moses Austin Cartland (1805–1863), Quaker abolitionist
- Ronald Cartland (1907–1940), British Conservative Member of Parliament from 1935 until he was killed in action in 1940

== Places ==
- Cartland, South Lanarkshire, Scotland

== See also ==
- Cartland Craigs, a woodland on the outskirts of Lanark, South Lanarkshire, Scotland
