= Justice Sawyer =

Justice Sawyer may refer to:

- Aaron W. Sawyer (1818–1882), associate justice of the New Hampshire Supreme Court
- George Yeaton Sawyer (1805–1882), associate justice of the |New Hampshire Supreme Court
- Joan Sawyer (judge) (born 1940), chief justice of the Bahamas
- Lorenzo Sawyer (1820–1891), associate justice and chief justice of the Supreme Court of California

== See also ==
- Judge Sawyer (disambiguation)
