= Senator Bond (disambiguation) =

Kit Bond (1939–2025) was a U.S. Senator from Missouri from 1987 to 2011. Senator Bond may also refer to:

- Dick Bond (Kansas politician) (1935–2020), Kansas State Senate
- Julian Bond (1940–2015), Georgia State Senate
- Michael Bond (American politician) (fl. 1990s–2010s), Illinois State Senate
- Thomas Hinckley Bond (1804–1882), New York State Senate and Connecticut State Senate
- William W. Bond (1884–1975), Tennessee State Senate
