= List of United States senators in the 27th Congress =

This is a complete list of United States senators during the 27th United States Congress listed by seniority from March 4, 1841, to March 3, 1843.

Order of service is based on the commencement of the senator's first term. Behind this is former service as a senator (only giving the senator seniority within their new incoming class), service as vice president, a House member, a cabinet secretary, or a governor of a state. The final factor is the population of the senator's state.

Senators who were sworn in during the middle of the two-year congressional term (up until the last senator who was not sworn in early after winning the November 1842 election) are listed at the end of the list with no number.

== Terms of service ==
Class	Terms of service of senators that expired in years
Class 3	Terms of service of senators that expired in 1843 (AL, AR, CT, GA, IL, IN, KY, LA, MD, MO, NC, NH, NY, OH, PA, SC, and VT.)
Class 1	Terms of service of senators that expired in 1845 (CT, DE, IN, MA, MD, ME, MI, MN, MO, MS, NJ, NY, OH, PA, RI, TN, VA, and VT.)
Class 2	Terms of service of senators that expired in 1847 (AL, AR, DE, GA, IL, KY, LA, MA, ME, MI, MS, NC, NH, NJ, RI, SC, TN, and VA.)

== U.S. Senate seniority list ==
U.S. Senate seniority
Rank	Senator (party-state)	Seniority date	Other factors
1	William Rufus de Vane King (D-AL)	December 14, 1819	
2	Thomas Hart Benton (D-MO)	August 10, 1821	
3	Samuel Prentiss (AJ-VT)	March 4, 1831	
4	Henry Clay (W-KY)	November 10, 1831	
5	John Caldwell Calhoun (D-SC)	December 29, 1832	
6	Silas Wright, Jr. (D-NY)	January 4, 1833	
7	Samuel Lewis Southard (D-NJ)	March 4, 1833	Former senator
8	Nathaniel Pitcher Tallmadge (W-NY)	March 4, 1833	
9	Lewis Fields Linn (D-MO)	October 25, 1833	
10	William Campbell Preston (N-SC)	November 26, 1833	
11	James Buchanan (D-PA)	December 6, 1834	
12	Alfred Cuthbert (D-MD)	January 12, 1835	
13	Robert John Walker (D-MS)	March 4, 1835	
14	William Cabell Rives (W-VA)	March 4, 1836	
15	Richard Henry Bayard (W-DE)	June 17, 1836	
16	Ambrose Hundley Sevier (D-AR)	September 18, 1836	Former delegate
17	William Savin Fulton (D-AR)	September 18, 1836	
18	Thomas Clayton (W-DE)	January 9, 1837	
19	Alexander Mouton (D-LA)	January 12, 1837	
20	Franklin Pierce (D-NH)	March 4, 1837	Former representative (4 years)
21	William Allen (D-OH)	March 4, 1837	Former representative (2 years); Ohio 5th in population (1830)
22	Oliver Hampton Smith (W-IN)	March 4, 1837	Former representative (2 years); Indiana 13th in population (1830)
23	Reuel Williams (D-ME)	March 4, 1837	Maine 12th in population (1830)
24	Perry Smith (D-CT)	March 4, 1837	Connecticut 16th in population (1830)
25	Richard Montgomery Young (D-IL)	March 4, 1837	Illinois 20th in population (1830)
26	Clement Comer Clay (D-AL)	June 19, 1837	
27	William Duhurst Merrick (W-MD)	January 4, 1838	
28	Albert Smith White (W-IN)	March 4, 1839	Former representative
29	Benjamin Tappan (D-OH)	March 4, 1839	Ohio 5th in population (1830)
30	Samuel Shethar Phelps (W-VT)	March 4, 1839	Vermont 17th in population (1830)
31	John Henderson (W-MS)	March 4, 1839	Mississippi 22nd in population (1830)
32	Nathan Fellows Dixon (W-RI)	March 4, 1839	Rhode Island 23rd in population (1830)
33	Daniel Sturgeon (D-PA)	January 14, 1840	
34	Augustus Seymour Porter (W-MI)	January 20, 1840	
35	Jabez Williams Huntington (W-CT)	May 4, 1840	
36	Willie Person Mangum (W-NC)	November 25, 1840	Former senator
37	William Alexander Graham (W-NC)	November 25, 1840	
38	Alfred Osborn Pope Nicholson (D-TN)	December 25, 1840	
39	John Leeds Kerr (W-MD)	January 5, 1841	
40	Isaac Chapman Bates (W-MA)	January 13, 1841	
41	Rufus Choate (W-MA)	February 23, 1841	
42	Levi Woodbury (D-NH)	March 4, 1841	Former senator (5 years)
43	John Macpherson Berrien (W-GA)	March 4, 1841	Former senator (4 years)
44	William Segar Archer (W-VA)	March 4, 1841	Former representative (15 years)
45	George Evans (W-ME)	March 4, 1841	Former representative (11 years)
46	William Woodbridge (W-MI)	March 4, 1841	Former delegate (1 year)
47	James Turner Morehead (W-KY)	March 4, 1841	Former governor
48	Jacob Welsh Miller (W-NJ)	March 4, 1841	New Jersey 14th in population (1830)
49	Alexander Barrow (W-LA)	March 4, 1841	Louisiana 19th in population (1830)
50	Samuel McRoberts (D-IL)	March 4, 1841	Illinois 20th in population (1830)
51	James F. Simmons (W-RI)	March 4, 1841	Rhode Island 23rd in population (1830)
52	Arthur Pendleton Bagby (D-AL)	November 24, 1841	
	William Sprague III (W-RI)	February 18, 1842	
	Leonard Wilcox (D-NH)	March 1, 1842	
	John Jordan Crittenden (W-KY)	March 31, 1842	
	Charles Magill Conrad (W-LA)	April 14, 1842	
	Samuel Chandler Crafts (W-VT)	April 23, 1842	
	William Lewis Dayton (W-NJ)	July 2, 1842	
	George McDuffie (D-SC)	December 23, 1842	

== See also ==
- 27th United States Congress
- List of United States representatives in the 27th Congress
