= Judge Sawyer =

Judge Sawyer may refer to:

- Hiram Wilson Sawyer (1843–1922), county judge of Washington County, Wisconsin
- John G. Sawyer (1825–1898), county judge of Orleans County, New York
- Robert William Sawyer (1880–1959), county court judge of Deschutes County, Oregon
- Samuel L. Sawyer (1813–1890), judge of the twenty-fourth judicial circuit of Missouri

== See also ==
- E. P. "Tom" Sawyer State Park, named for county judge Erbon Powers "Tom" Sawyer (died 1969)
- Justice Sawyer (disambiguation)
