= Cartland, South Lanarkshire =

Village in South Lanarkshire, Scotland

Coordinates: 55°40′18″N 3°53′39″W

Cartland is a village in South Lanarkshire, Scotland.

== See also ==
- List of places in South Lanarkshire
