= Jonathan Taylor (Ohio politician) =

American politician (1796–1848)

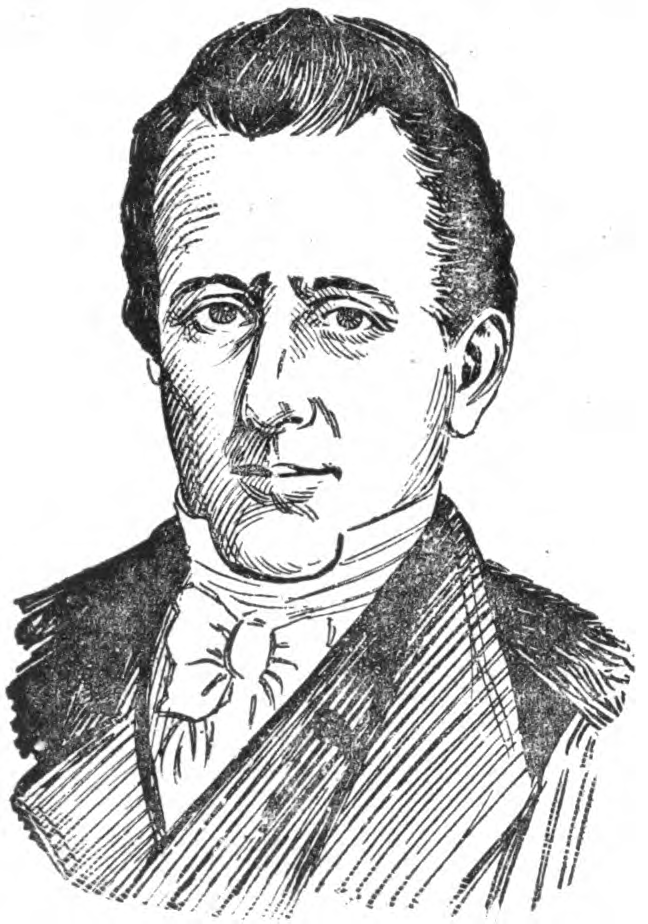

Member of the U.S. House of Representatives from Ohio's 12th district
- In office March 4, 1839 – March 3, 1841
- Preceded by: Alexander Harper
- Succeeded by: Joshua Mathiot

Member of the Ohio Senate
- In office 1833-1836

Member of the Ohio House of Representatives
- In office 1831-1833

Personal details
- Born: 1796 Mansfield, Connecticut, U.S.
- Died: April 1848 (aged 51–52) Newark, Ohio, U.S.
- Resting place: Cedar Hill Cemetery, Newark
- Party: Democratic

Jonathan Taylor (1796 – April 1848) was an American lawyer and politician who served one term as a U.S. representative from Ohio from 1839 to 1841.

== Biography ==
Born near Mansfield, Connecticut, Taylor moved to Newark, Ohio. He completed an academic course. He studied law. He was admitted to the bar and commenced practice in Newark.

=== Early political career ===
He was appointed by the Governor a commissioner to settle the boundary dispute between Ohio and Michigan. Brigadier general in the State militia. He served as member of the Ohio House of Representatives from 1831 to 1833, and in the Ohio Senate from 1833 to 1836.

=== Congress ===
Taylor was elected as a Democrat to the Twenty-sixth Congress (March 4, 1839 – March 3, 1841).

== Death and burial ==
He died in Newark, Ohio, in April 1848 and was interred in the Old Cemetery. He was reinterred in Cedar Hill Cemetery.

== Sources ==
- United States Congress. "Jonathan Taylor (id: T000092)". Biographical Directory of the United States Congress.

U.S. House of Representatives
Preceded by Alexander Harper	Member of the U.S. House of Representatives from Ohio's 12th congressional district March 4, 1839 – March 3, 1841	Succeeded by Joshua Mathiot
