= Terry H. Cahal =

American politician

- Born: September 4, 1802; Virginia, U.S.
- Died: April 15, 1851 (aged 48); Nashville, Tennessee, U.S.
- Resting place: Nashville City Cemetery
- Occupation: Politician
- Spouse: Ann C. Cahal

Terry H. Cahal (September 4, 1802 – April 15, 1851) was an American jurist and politician in the Antebellum South. He served as the Speaker of the Tennessee Senate and the Chancellor of Tennessee.

== Early life ==
Terry H. Cahal was born on September 4, 1802, in Virginia. He served in the First Seminole War of 1816–1819.

== Career ==
Cahal was a lawyer and politician. He served as a member of the Tennessee twice. He also served as its Speaker once. He subsequently served as the "Chancellor" of Tennessee. In 1833, he warned against secession in the wake of the Nullification Crisis. On slavery, Cahal argued:

it is not a good institution either for master or servant, but that its abrupt and sudden abrogation would make the condition of both infinitely worse. Who could live in Tennessee if all the negroes, as a degraded class, were set free to remain here? Not I, not you. In our wealthy and densely populated counties free negroes are pests, and for themselves their condition is generally worse than that of the slaves. [...] A great system of law and order cannot be revolutionized at once without the greatest calamities. African slavery must perish. This is destiny, and if you please, progress; but it ought to die naturally and gradually.

— Terry H. Cahal, Letter to Jeremiah Smith (January 30, 1851)

== Personal life and death ==
Cahal had a wife named Ann. He died on April 15, 1851.

== Works ==
- Cahal, Terry H. Address of Terry H. Cahal, to the Freemen of the Ninth Electoral District of the State of Tennessee. OCLC 13167400.
- Cahal, Terry H. (1838). Tennessee Subtreasury Preamble and Resolutions of the General Assembly of Tennessee # 181. OCLC 772604971.
- Cahal, Terry H. (1838). Tennessee- Disposal of Vacant Lands Document No. 317. Washington. OCLC 772604972.
