= 1840 Ohio gubernatorial election =

- October 13, 1840
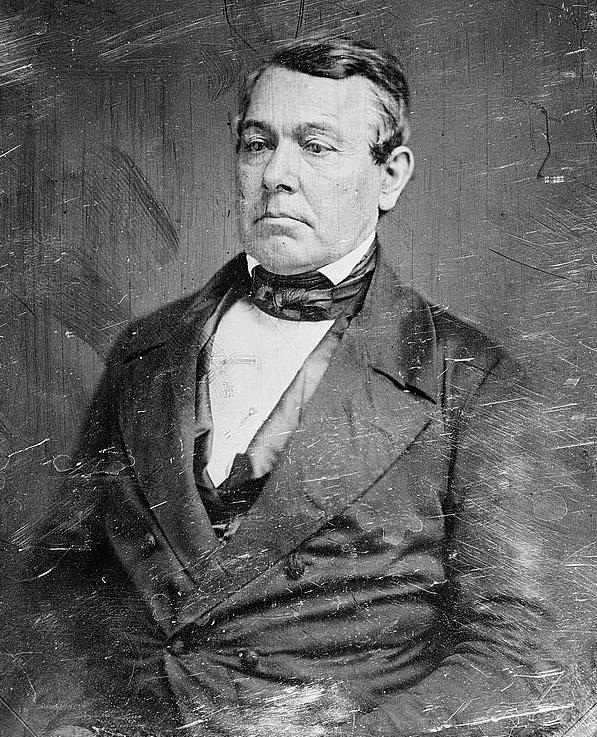

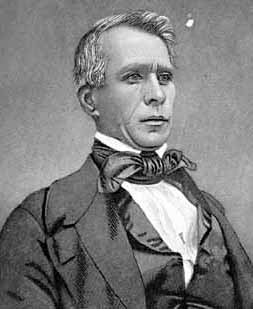
Nominee	Thomas Corwin	Wilson Shannon
Party	Whig	Democratic
Popular vote	145,442	129,312
Percentage	52.93%	47.06%
County results
Corwin
50–60%
60–70%
70–80%
Shannon
50–60%
60–70%
70–80%
Governor before election
Wilson Shannon
Democratic
Elected Governor
Thomas Corwin
Whig

The 1840 Ohio gubernatorial election was held on October 13, 1840.

Incumbent Democratic Governor Wilson Shannon was defeated by Whig nominee, former U.S. Representative Thomas Corwin.

== General election ==
=== Results ===
1840 Ohio gubernatorial election
Party	Candidate	Votes	%	±%
Whig	Thomas Corwin	145,442	52.93%	
Democratic	Wilson Shannon (incumbent)	129,312	47.06%	
Scattering		8	0.00%	
Majority		16,130	5.87%	
Turnout		274,762		
Whig gain from Democratic		Swing		
