= John Hill (North Carolina politician) =

American politician

John Hill (April 9, 1797 – April 24, 1861) was a U.S. representative from North Carolina.

Born near Germanton, North Carolina, Hill completed preparatory studies and was graduated from the University of North Carolina at Chapel Hill in 1816. He was a planter, also serving as clerk of court of Stokes County, North Carolina, for thirty years.

He served as member of the North Carolina House of Commons from 1819 to 1823, and in the North Carolina State Senate 1823–1825, 1830, and 1831.

Hill was elected as a Democrat to the Twenty-sixth Congress (March 4, 1839 – March 3, 1841). He was a reading clerk in the State Senate in 1850, and served as delegate to the State constitutional convention at Raleigh, North Carolina, in 1861.

Hill died in Raleigh, North Carolina, April 24, 1861, and was interred in Old Hill Burying Ground, near Germanton, North Carolina.

== Sources ==
- United States Congress. "John Hill (id: H000594)". Biographical Directory of the United States Congress.

U.S. House of Representatives
Preceded by Augustine H. Shepperd	Member of the U.S. House of Representatives from North Carolina's 9th congressional district 1839–1841	Succeeded by Augustine H. Shepperd
