= John Ely (New York politician) =

American politician (1774–1849)

Member of the U.S. House of Representatives from New York's 8th district
- In office March 4, 1839 – March 3, 1841
- Preceded by: Zadock Pratt
- Succeeded by: Jacob Houck Jr.

Member of the New York State Assembly
- In office 1806; 1812

Personal details
- Born: October 8, 1774 Saybrook, Connecticut Colony
- Died: August 20, 1849 (aged 74) Coxsackie, New York, U.S.
- Resting place: Old Coxsackie Cemetery, Coxsackie, New York, U.S.
- Party: Democratic
- Occupation: Politician, physician

John Ely (October 8, 1774 – August 20, 1849) was an American medical doctor and politician who served one term as a U.S. representative from New York from 1839 to 1841.

== Biography ==
Born in Saybrook, Connecticut, Ely completed preparatory studies. He studied medicine, and practiced in Coxsackie, New York. He served as member of the State assembly in 1806 and 1812. He was one of the organizers of the New York State and Greene County Medical Societies in 1807 and also of the Albany Female Academy.

=== Congress ===
Ely was elected as a Democrat to the Twenty-sixth Congress (March 4, 1839 – March 3, 1841).

=== Later career and death ===
He resumed the practice of medicine. He died in Coxsackie, New York, August 20, 1849. He was interred in Old Coxsackie Cemetery.

U.S. House of Representatives
Preceded by Zadock Pratt	Member of the U.S. House of Representatives from New York's 8th congressional district 1839–1841	Succeeded by Jacob Houck, Jr.
