= Joshua Mathiot =

American politician

Member of the U.S. House of Representatives from Ohio's 12th district
- In office March 4, 1841 – March 3, 1843
- Preceded by: Jonathan Taylor
- Succeeded by: Samuel Finley Vinton

Personal details
- Born: April 4, 1800 Connellsville, Pennsylvania, U.S.
- Died: July 30, 1849 (aged 49) Newark, Ohio, U.S.
- Resting place: Cedar Hill Cemetery
- Party: Whig

Joshua Mathiot (April 4, 1800 – July 30, 1849) was a 19th-century politician who served one term as a U.S. representative from Ohio from 1841 to 1843.

== Biography ==
Born in Connellsville, Pennsylvania, Mathiot moved to Newark, Ohio, around 1830. He studied law. He was admitted to the bar, and practiced in Newark. Mathiot served as prosecuting attorney from 1832 to 1836, and as mayor of Newark in 1834.

=== Congress ===
Mathiot was elected as a Whig to the Twenty-seventh Congress (March 4, 1841 – March 3, 1843).

He was Grand worthy patriarch of the Sons of Temperance in Ohio.

=== Death and burial ===
While attending a temperance convention at Sandusky, he contracted cholera, from which he died in Newark, Ohio, July 30, 1849. He was interred in Cedar Hill Cemetery.

== Sources ==
- United States Congress. "Joshua Mathiot (id: M000243)". Biographical Directory of the United States Congress.

U.S. House of Representatives
Preceded by Jonathan Taylor	Member of the U.S. House of Representatives from Ohio's 12th congressional district March 4, 1841 – March 3, 1843	Succeeded by Samuel F. Vinton
