= Jacob Houck Jr. =

American politician

Member of the U.S. House of Representatives from New York's 8th district
- In office March 4, 1841 – March 3, 1843
- Preceded by: John Ely
- Succeeded by: Richard D. Davis

Personal details
- Born: January 14, 1801 Schoharie, New York, USA
- Died: October 2, 1857 (aged 56) Schoharie, New York, USA
- Resting place: Lutheran Cemetery
- Party: Democratic

Jacob Houck Jr. (January 14, 1801 – October 2, 1857) was an American lawyer and politician who served one term as a U.S. representative from New York from 1841 to 1843.

== Biography ==
Born in Schoharie, New York, Houck attended the common schools. He was graduated from Union College, Schenectady, New York, in 1822. He studied law. He was admitted to the bar and practiced in Schoharie.

He served as district attorney of Schoharie County 1831–1836.

=== Congress ===
Houck was elected as a Democrat to the Twenty-seventh Congress (March 4, 1841 – March 3, 1843).

=== Later career and death ===
He resumed the practice of law.

He died in Schoharie, New York, October 2, 1857. He was interred in Lutheran Cemetery.

== Sources ==
- United States Congress. "Jacob Houck Jr. (id: H000810)". Biographical Directory of the United States Congress.

U.S. House of Representatives
Preceded by John Ely	Member of the U.S. House of Representatives from New York's 8th congressional district 1841 - 1843	Succeeded by Richard D. Davis
