= George Yeaton Sawyer =

American judge (1805–1882)

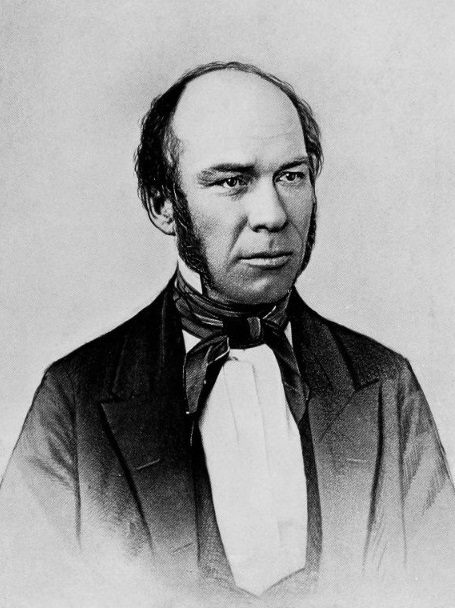
Justice George Yeaton Sawyer

George Yeaton Sawyer (December 5, 1805 – June 15, 1882) was a New Hampshire lawyer and politician who served as a justice of the New Hampshire Supreme Court from 1855 to 1859.

== Early life, education, and career ==
Born at Wakefield, New Hampshire, to William and Mary (Yeaton) Sawyer, Sawyer attended Phillips Exeter Academy until 1822, and graduated from Bowdoin College in 1826, having been president of his class. He read law under his father's supervision, and was admitted to the bar and commenced practice at Meredith, New Hampshire in 1830. After practicing there four years he removed to Nashua, New Hampshire, where he became a partner of his uncle, Aaron S. Sawyer, and immediately entered into a large and lucrative practice.

== Political and judicial activities ==
He was elected to the legislature from 1839 to 1841 and again repeatedly in later life.

He was appointed as a circuit justice of the court of common pleas on July 7, 1851, from which he resigned September 17, 1854, to return to practice. Following a reorganization of the supreme judicial court in 1854, he was appointed as a justice of that court on July 20, 1855. He served until November 1st, 1859, when he resigned "for the reason that his private practice was more lucrative and less exacting".

In the 1850s, he was a candidate of the Whig Party for a seat in Congress, but lost the election by a few votes. During that same period, President Franklin Pierce, whom Sawyer had known since boyhood, offered Sawyer the governorship of a territory, which Sawyer declined, due to their difference of party.

He was thereafter city solicitor of Nashua from 1862 to 1864, and again from 1873 to 1874; he was also appointed by the court to perform the duties of county solicitor, during the absence of that officer in the army. In 1865 he was appointed a commissioner with Samuel D. Bell and Asa Fowler, to revise the laws of the state. The illness of Judge Bell threw the work upon Sawyer and Fowler. Their report was adopted, with very slight modifications, by the legislature in 1867, and was highly approved. In 1866 he was chairman of the committee on judiciary, and in 1875 he was chairman of a special committee to consider the system of taxation.

== Personal life and death ==
In October 1834, Sawyer married Emeline Tucker of Laconia, New Hampshire, which whom he had five daughters and three sons. Two sons and a daughter died in infancy, and the third son died while serving in the American Civil War, Sawyer's wife survived him, living until 1891.

Sawyer died at Nashua at the age of 76.
