= Thomas Hinckley Bond =

American politician

Thomas Hinckley Bond (January 14, 1804 – May 27, 1882) was an American public official and businessman who lived in Oswego, New York, and New Haven, Connecticut.

== Early life and education ==
Bond, younger son of Dr. Solomon and Sally (Hinckley) Bond, was born in Enfield, Conn., January 14, 1804. His father was a medical doctor.

He graduated Yale College in 1825, and studied law at Yale Law School.

== Career ==
Early in his career, Bond invested $60,000 in a manufacturing enterprise in Waterbury, Connecticut. The business failed and he lost his entire investment.

He then settled in the practice of law in Pittsburgh, Pa., but in 1831 moved to Oswego, N. Y., where he resided for twenty-three years engaged in the milling and flouring business, being also for some time collector of the port, and a New York State Senator.

In 1854, having earned back what he had lost, Bond retired from business, spent a year in Europe with his family. In 1855, Bond returned to New Haven, Conn., where he continued to live until his death. He became politically prominent in Connecticut, serving in both branches of the Connecticut State Legislature. He once ran as the Democratic candidate for lieutenant governor, on a ticket with Thomas H. Seymour.

== Personal life and death ==
Bond was twice married, his first wife being Elizabeth, daughter of Capt. James Goodrich, of New Haven, by whom he had a son, and a daughter. In June 1869, he married Mary, daughter of the Hon. Royal R. Hinman.

He died at his home on Trumbull Street in New Haven on May 27, 1882, at the age of 78. He had been an invalid for several years with spine and kidney problems.
