= Moses Austin Cartland =

Moses Austin Cartland (1805–1863) was a Quaker abolitionist and editor. He was a second cousin to and a confidant of the poet John Greenleaf Whittier. Cartland was the founder of the Clinton Grove Academy, the first Quaker seminary in New Hampshire. He also played an active role in the Underground Railroad, helping former slave Oliver Gilbert to escape to New York in 1852. Whittier's poem, "A Memorial: M.A.C.," which appeared in The Poetical Works of John Greenleaf Whittier (1869), addressed Cartland's death. In the poem, Whittier writes: "In love surpassing that of brothers, | We walked, O friend, from childhood's day."
