= Augustine Henry Shepperd =

American politician

Augustine Henry Shepperd (February 24, 1792 – July 11, 1864) was a lawyer and politician in North Carolina. He served as a U.S. representative from North Carolina for numerous terms, most often as a member of the Whig Party.

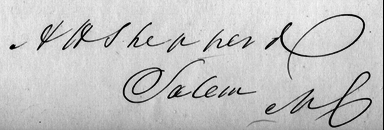
Autograph of Congressman Augustine Henry Shepperd of Salem, North Carolina.

== Early life and education ==
Born in Rockford, North Carolina, on February 24, 1792, Shepperd completed private preparatory studies and studied law. He had a younger brother William W. Shepperd, who emigrated to Mexican Texas with others in the family in 1831. Augustine Shepperd was admitted to the bar and commenced practice in Surry County, North Carolina.

== Political career ==
Shepperd soon became involved in politics, being elected to the state house of representatives and serving 1822–1826.

He was elected to the Twentieth through Twenty-third Congresses. He was elected as a Whig to the Twenty-fourth and Twenty-fifth Congresses (serving March 4, 1827 – March 3, 1839).

During these periods, he served as chairman, Committee on Expenditures in the Department of the Navy (Twenty-first Congress), Committee on Expenditures in the Department of War (Twenty-second Congress), and on the Committee on Expenditures in the Department of State (Twenty-third and Twenty-fourth Congresses).

He was a consistent supporter of Native Americans, influenced by the Moravian mission tradition.

He was an unsuccessful candidate for reelection in 1838 to the Twenty-sixth Congress. In the next cycle, he was elected again as a Whig to the Twenty-seventh Congress (March 4, 1841 – March 3, 1843); serving as chairman, Committee on Public Expenditures (Twenty-seventh Congress).

After another gap, he was elected as a Whig to the Thirtieth and Thirty-first Congresses (March 4, 1847 – March 3, 1851).

He declined to run for reelection in 1850 and returned to North Carolina to resume the practice of law.

== Personal life and death ==
Shepperd married Miss Turner and had a family. He was the father of Mary Frances ("Fanny") Shepperd. She married William Dorsey Pender, who became a Confederate general.

He died at the plantation "Good Spring," Salem, North Carolina, on July 11, 1864. He was interred in Salem Cemetery.

== See also ==
- Twentieth United States Congress
- Twenty-first United States Congress
- Twenty-second United States Congress
- Twenty-third United States Congress
- Twenty-fourth United States Congress
- Twenty-fifth United States Congress
- Twenty-seventh United States Congress
- Thirtieth United States Congress
- Thirty-first United States Congress

U.S. House of Representatives
Preceded by Romulus M. Saunders	Member of the U.S. House of Representatives from North Carolina's 9th congressional district 1827–1839	Succeeded by John Hill
Preceded by John Hill	Member of the U.S. House of Representatives from North Carolina's 9th congressional district 1841–1843	Succeeded by Kenneth Rayner
Preceded by Alfred Dockery	Member of the U.S. House of Representatives from North Carolina's 4th congressional district 1847–1851	Succeeded by James T. Morehead
