= List of United States representatives in the 26th Congress =

This is a complete list of United States representatives during the 26th United States Congress listed by seniority.

As an historical article, the districts and party affiliations listed reflect those during the 26th Congress (March 4, 1839 – March 3, 1841). Seats and party affiliations on similar lists for other congresses will be different for certain members.

Seniority depends on the date on which members were sworn into office. Since many members are sworn in on the same day, subsequent ranking is based on previous congressional service of the individual and then by alphabetical order by the last name of the representative.

Committee chairmanship in the House is often associated with seniority. However, party leadership is typically not associated with seniority.

Note: The "*" indicates that the representative/delegate may have served one or more non-consecutive terms while in the House of Representatives of the United States Congress.

== U.S. House seniority list ==
U.S. House seniority
Rank	Representative	Party	District	Seniority date (previous service, if any)	No. of term(s)	Notes
1	Lewis Williams	W	NC-13	March 4, 1815	13th term	Dean of the House
2	Charles F. Mercer	W	VA-14	March 4, 1817	12th term	Resigned on December 26, 1839.
3	Henry William Connor	D	NC-11	March 4, 1821	10th term	Left the House in 1841.
4	John Reed Jr.	W	MA-11	March 4, 1821; Previous service, 1813–1817.	12th term*	Left the House in 1841.
5	John Bell	W	TN-07	March 4, 1827	7th term	Left the House in 1841.
6	Horace Everett	W	VT-03	March 4, 1829	6th term	
7	Dixon H. Lewis	D	AL-04	March 4, 1829	6th term	
8	George Evans	W	ME-04	July 20, 1829	6th term	Resigned on March 3, 1841.
9	John Quincy Adams	W	MA-12	March 4, 1831	5th term	
10	George N. Briggs	W	MA-07	March 4, 1831	5th term	
11	Thomas Corwin	W	OH-04	March 4, 1831	5th term	Resigned on May 30, 1840.
12	John K. Griffin	D	SC-09	March 4, 1831	5th term	Left the House in 1841.
13	James Iver McKay	D	NC-05	March 4, 1831	5th term	
14	Francis Thomas	D	MD-06	March 4, 1831	5th term	Left the House in 1841.
15	William Slade	W	VT-02	November 1, 1831	5th term	
16	Micajah Thomas Hawkins	D	NC-06	December 15, 1831	5th term	Left the House in 1841.
17	Hiland Hall	W	VT-01	January 1, 1833	5th term	
18	Jesse Atherton Bynum	D	NC-02	March 4, 1833	4th term	Left the House in 1841.
19	Zadok Casey	D	IL-02	March 4, 1833	4th term	
20	Edmund Deberry	W	NC-07	March 4, 1833; Previous service, 1829–1831.	5th term*	
21	James Graham	W	NC-12	March 4, 1833	4th term	
22	David D. Wagener	D	PA-07	March 4, 1833	4th term	Left the House in 1841.
23	Henry A. Wise	W	VA-08	March 4, 1833	4th term	
24	Levi Lincoln Jr.	W	MA-05	February 17, 1834	4th term	
25	Rice Garland	W	LA-03	April 28, 1834	4th term	Resigned on July 21, 1840.
26	Francis Wilkinson Pickens	D	SC-05	December 8, 1834	4th term	
27	William K. Bond	W	OH-07	March 4, 1835	3rd term	Left the House in 1841.
28	William B. Calhoun	W	MA-08	March 4, 1835	3rd term	
29	William Blount Carter	W	TN-01	March 4, 1835	3rd term	Left the House in 1841.
30	Reuben Chapman	D	AL-01	March 4, 1835	3rd term	
31	Robert Craig	D	VA-17	March 4, 1835; Previous service, 1829–1833.	5th term*	Left the House in 1841.
32	Walter Coles	D	VA-06	March 4, 1835	3rd term	
33	Caleb Cushing	W	MA-03	March 4, 1835	3rd term	
44	George Dromgoole	D	VA-04	March 4, 1835	3rd term	Left the House in 1841.
45	James Garland	C	VA-12	March 4, 1835	3rd term	Left the House in 1841.
46	William J. Graves	W	KY-08	March 4, 1835	3rd term	Left the House in 1841.
47	Albert Galliton Harrison	D	MO	March 4, 1835	3rd term	Died on September 7, 1839.
48	George W. Hopkins	D	VA-18	March 4, 1835	3rd term	
49	Daniel Jenifer	W	MD-07	March 4, 1835; Previous service, 1831–1833.	4th term*	Left the House in 1841.
50	Joseph Johnson	D	VA-20	March 4, 1835; Previous service, 1823–1827 and 1833.	6th term**	Left the House in 1841.
51	John W. Jones	D	VA-03	March 4, 1835	3rd term	
52	Samson Mason	W	OH-10	March 4, 1835	3rd term	
53	William Montgomery	D	NC-08	March 4, 1835	3rd term	Left the House in 1841.
54	David Abel Russell	W	NY-12	March 4, 1835	3rd term	Left the House in 1841.
55	John Taliaferro	W	VA-10	March 4, 1835; Previous service, 1801–1803, 1811–1813 and 1824–1831.	9th term***	
56	Joseph R. Underwood	W	KY-03	March 4, 1835	3rd term	
57	John White	W	KY-09	March 4, 1835	3rd term	
58	Sherrod Williams	W	KY-04	March 4, 1835	3rd term	Left the House in 1841.
59	Waddy Thompson Jr.	W	SC-06	September 10, 1835	3rd term	Left the House in 1841.
60	William Crosby Dawson	W	GA	November 7, 1836	3rd term	
61	Isaac E. Crary	D	MI	January 26, 1837	3rd term	Left the House in 1841.
62	John W. Allen	W	OH-15	March 4, 1837	2nd term	Left the House in 1841.
63	Hugh J. Anderson	D	ME-06	March 4, 1837	2nd term	Left the House in 1841.
64	Charles G. Atherton	D	NH	March 4, 1837	2nd term	
65	William Beatty	D	PA-23	March 4, 1837	2nd term	Left the House in 1841.
66	Andrew Beirne	D	VA-19	March 4, 1837	2nd term	Left the House in 1841.
67	Richard Biddle	W	PA-22	March 4, 1837	2nd term	Resigned on July 21, 1840.
68	John Campbell	D	SC-03	March 4, 1837; Previous service, 1829–1831.	3rd term*	
69	William B. Campbell	W	TN-06	March 4, 1837	2nd term	
70	John C. Clark	W	NY-21	March 4, 1837; Previous service, 1827–1829.	3rd term*	
71	Robert B. Cranston	W	RI	March 4, 1837	2nd term	
72	John Wesley Crockett	W	TN-12	March 4, 1837	2nd term	Left the House in 1841.
73	Edward Curtis	W	NY-03	March 4, 1837	2nd term	Left the House in 1841.
74	Thomas Davee	D	ME-08	March 4, 1837	2nd term	Left the House in 1841.
75	Edward Davies	W	PA-04	March 4, 1837	2nd term	Left the House in 1841.
76	John Dennis	W	MD-01	March 4, 1837	2nd term	Left the House in 1841.
77	Alexander Duncan	D	OH-01	March 4, 1837	2nd term	Left the House in 1841.
78	Millard Fillmore	W	NY-32	March 4, 1837; Previous service, 1833–1835.	3rd term*	
79	Isaac Fletcher	D	VT-05	March 4, 1837	2nd term	Left the House in 1841.
80	Patrick Gaines Goode	W	OH-03	March 4, 1837	2nd term	
81	Robert Hanna Hammond	D	PA-16	March 4, 1837	2nd term	Left the House in 1841.
82	William S. Hastings	W	MA-09	March 4, 1837	2nd term	
83	Richard Hawes	W	KY-10	March 4, 1837	2nd term	Left the House in 1841.
84	Thomas Henry	W	PA-24	March 4, 1837	2nd term	
85	Ogden Hoffman	W	NY-03	March 4, 1837	2nd term	Left the House in 1841.
86	Robert M. T. Hunter	W	VA-09	March 4, 1837	2nd term	Speaker of the House
87	Thomas B. Jackson	D	NY-01	March 4, 1837	2nd term	Left the House in 1841.
88	William Cost Johnson	W	MD-05	March 4, 1837; Previous service, 1833–1835.	3rd term*	
89	Nathaniel Jones	D	NY-06	March 4, 1837	2nd term	Left the House in 1841.
90	Gouverneur Kemble	D	NY-04	March 4, 1837	2nd term	Left the House in 1841.
91	Daniel Parkhurst Leadbetter	D	OH-13	March 4, 1837	2nd term	Left the House in 1841.
92	Richard P. Marvin	D	NY-31	March 4, 1837	2nd term	Left the House in 1841.
93	Abraham McClellan	D	TN-02	March 4, 1837	2nd term	
94	John Miller	D	MO	March 4, 1837	2nd term	
95	Charles F. Mitchell	W	NY-33	March 4, 1837	2nd term	Left the House in 1841.
96	Calvary Morris	W	OH-06	March 4, 1837	2nd term	
97	Charles Ogle	W	PA-18	March 4, 1837	2nd term	
98	William Parmenter	D	MA-04	March 4, 1837	2nd term	
99	Lemuel Paynter	D	PA-01	March 4, 1837	2nd term	Left the House in 1841.
100	Luther C. Peck	W	NY-30	March 4, 1837	2nd term	Left the House in 1841.
101	David Petrikin	D	PA-15	March 4, 1837	2nd term	Left the House in 1841.
102	John Pope	W	KY-07	March 4, 1837	2nd term	
103	William Wilson Potter	D	PA-14	March 4, 1837	2nd term	Died on October 28, 1839.
104	John Holmes Prentiss	D	NY-19	March 4, 1837	2nd term	Left the House in 1841.
105	Joseph Fitz Randolph	W	NJ	March 4, 1837	2nd term	
106	James Rariden	W	IN-05	March 4, 1837	2nd term	Left the House in 1841.
107	Robert Rhett	D	SC-02	March 4, 1837	2nd term	
108	Joseph Ridgway	W	OH-08	March 4, 1837	2nd term	
109	Francis E. Rives	D	VA-02	March 4, 1837	2nd term	Left the House in 1841.
110	John Sergeant	W	PA-02	March 4, 1837; Previous service, 1815–1823 and 1828–1829.	7th term**	
111	Charles Biddle Shepard	D	NC-04	March 4, 1837	2nd term	Left the House in 1841.
112	Edward Stanly	W	NC-03	March 4, 1837	2nd term	
113	Joseph L. Tillinghast	W	RI	March 4, 1837	2nd term	
114	George Washington Toland	W	PA-02	March 4, 1837	2nd term	
115	Hopkins L. Turney	D	TN-05	March 4, 1837	2nd term	
116	Christopher Harris Williams	W	TN-13	March 4, 1837	2nd term	
117	Jared W. Williams	D	NH	March 4, 1837	2nd term	Left the House in 1841.
118	Joseph Lanier Williams	W	TN-03	March 4, 1837	2nd term	
119	John T. H. Worthington	D	MD-03	March 4, 1837; Previous service, 1831–1833.	3rd term*	Left the House in 1841.
120	Charles Naylor	W	PA-03	June 29, 1837	2nd term	Left the House in 1841.
121	Samuel Wells Morris	D	PA-17	September 4, 1837	2nd term	Left the House in 1841.
122	George May Keim	D	PA-09	March 17, 1838	2nd term	
123	Linn Banks	D	VA-13	April 28, 1838	2nd term	
124	Virgil D. Parris	D	ME-05	May 29, 1838	2nd term	Left the House in 1841.
125	George Whitfield Crabb	W	AL-03	September 3, 1838	2nd term	Left the House in 1841.
126	Joshua R. Giddings	W	OH-16	December 3, 1838	2nd term	
127	Henry Swearingen	D	OH-19	December 3, 1838	2nd term	Left the House in 1841.
128	Leverett Saltonstall I	W	MA-02	December 5, 1838	2nd term	
129	Julius Caesar Alford	W	GA	March 4, 1839; Previous service, 1837.	2nd term*	
130	Judson Allen	D	NY-20	March 4, 1839	1st term	Left the House in 1841.
131	James C. Alvord	W	MA-06	March 4, 1839	1st term	Died on September 27, 1839.
132	Simeon H. Anderson	W	KY-05	March 4, 1839	1st term	Died on August 11, 1840.
133	Landaff Andrews	W	KY-11	March 4, 1839	1st term	
134	Daniel D. Barnard	W	NY-10	March 4, 1839; Previous service, 1827–1829.	2nd term*	
135	Edward Junius Black	W	GA	March 4, 1839	1st term	Left the House in 1841.
136	Julius W. Blackwell	D	TN-04	March 4, 1839	1st term	Left the House in 1841.
137	John Botts	W	VA-11	March 4, 1839	1st term	
138	Linn Boyd	D	KY-01	March 4, 1839; Previous service, 1835–1837.	2nd term*	
139	David P. Brewster	D	NY-17	March 4, 1839	1st term	
140	John H. Brockway	W	CT-06	March 4, 1839	1st term	
141	Aaron V. Brown	D	TN-10	March 4, 1839	1st term	
142	Albert G. Brown	D	MS	March 4, 1839	1st term	Left the House in 1841.
143	Anson Brown	W	NY-11	March 4, 1839	1st term	Died on June 14, 1840.
144	Edmund Burke	D	NH	March 4, 1839	1st term	
145	Sampson H. Butler	D	SC-04	March 4, 1839	1st term	
146	William Orlando Butler	D	KY-13	March 4, 1839	1st term	
147	John Carr	D	IN-03	March 4, 1839; Previous service, 1831–1837.	4th term*	Left the House in 1841.
148	James Carroll	D	MD-04	March 4, 1839	1st term	Left the House in 1841.
149	Thomas Withers Chinn	W	LA-02	March 4, 1839	1st term	Left the House in 1841.
150	Thomas C. Chittenden	W	NY-18	March 4, 1839	1st term	
151	Nathan Clifford	D	ME-01	March 4, 1839	1st term	
152	Walter T. Colquitt	W	GA	March 4, 1839	1st term	Resigned on July 21, 1840.
153	James Cooper	W	PA-12	March 4, 1839	1st term	
154	Mark Anthony Cooper	W	GA	March 4, 1839	1st term	Left the House in 1841.
155	William Raworth Cooper	D	NJ	March 4, 1839	1st term	Left the House in 1841.
156	Edward Cross	D	AR	March 4, 1839	1st term	
157	Amasa Dana	D	NY-22	March 4, 1839	1st term	Left the House in 1841.
158	Garrett Davis	W	KY-12	March 4, 1839	1st term	
159	John Wesley Davis	D	IN-02	March 4, 1839; Previous service, 1835–1837.	2nd term*	Left the House in 1841.
160	John Davis	D	PA-06	March 4, 1839	1st term	Left the House in 1841.
161	James Dellet	W	AL-05	March 4, 1839	1st term	Left the House in 1841.
162	Philemon Dickerson	D	NJ	March 4, 1839; Previous service, 1833–1836.	3rd term*	Left the House in 1841.
163	William Doan	D	OH-05	March 4, 1839	1st term	
164	Andrew W. Doig	D	NY-16	March 4, 1839	1st term	
165	Nehemiah H. Earll	D	NY-23	March 4, 1839	1st term	Left the House in 1841.
166	Ira Allen Eastman	D	NH	March 4, 1839	1st term	
167	John Edwards	W	PA-04	March 4, 1839	1st term	
168	John Ely	D	NY-08	March 4, 1839	1st term	Left the House in 1841.
169	John Fine	D	NY-14	March 4, 1839	1st term	Left the House in 1841.
170	Charles Fisher	D	NC-10	March 4, 1839; Previous service, 1819–1821.	3rd term*	Left the House in 1841.
171	John G. Floyd	D	NY-17	March 4, 1839	1st term	
172	Joseph Fornance	D	PA-05	March 4, 1839	1st term	
173	John Galbraith	D	PA-25	March 4, 1839; Previous service, 1833–1837.	3rd term*	Left the House in 1841.
174	Seth M. Gates	W	NY-29	March 4, 1839	1st term	
175	Meredith P. Gentry	W	TN-08	March 4, 1839	1st term	
176	James Gerry	W	PA-11	March 4, 1839	1st term	
177	Francis Granger	W	NY-26	March 4, 1839; Previous service, 1835–1837.	2nd term*	
178	Willis Green	W	KY-06	March 4, 1839	1st term	
179	Moses H. Grinnell	W	NY-03	March 4, 1839	1st term	Left the House in 1841.
180	William L. Goggin	W	VA-07	March 4, 1839	1st term	
181	Richard W. Habersham	W	GA	March 4, 1839	1st term	
182	Augustus C. Hand	D	NY-13	March 4, 1839	1st term	Left the House in 1841.
183	John Hastings	D	OH-17	March 4, 1839	1st term	
184	John Hill	D	NC-09	March 4, 1839	1st term	Left the House in 1841.
185	John Hill	W	VA-05	March 4, 1839	1st term	Left the House in 1841.
186	Solomon Hillen Jr.	D	MD-04	March 4, 1839	1st term	Left the House in 1841.
187	Joel Holleman	D	VA-01	March 4, 1839	1st term	Resigned in December 1840.
188	Isaac E. Holmes	D	SC-01	March 4, 1839	1st term	
189	Enos Hook	D	PA-20	March 4, 1839	1st term	
190	David Hubbard	D	AL-02	March 4, 1839	1st term	Left the House in 1841.
191	Hiram P. Hunt	W	NY-09	March 4, 1839; Previous service, 1835–1837.	2nd term*	
192	Francis James	W	PA-04	March 4, 1839	1st term	
193	Cave Johnson	D	TN-11	March 4, 1839; Previous service, 1829–1837.	5th term*	
194	Charles Johnston	W	NY-05	March 4, 1839	1st term	Left the House in 1841.
195	Thomas Kempshall	W	NY-28	March 4, 1839	1st term	Left the House in 1841.
196	Joseph Kille	D	NJ	March 4, 1839	1st term	Left the House in 1841.
197	Thomas B. King	W	GA	March 4, 1839	1st term	
198	Abbott Lawrence	W	MA-01	March 4, 1839; Previous service, 1835–1837.	2nd term*	Resigned on September 18, 1840.
199	Isaac Leet	D	PA-21	March 4, 1839	1st term	Left the House in 1841.
200	Stephen B. Leonard	D	NY-22	March 4, 1839; Previous service, 1835–1837.	2nd term*	Left the House in 1841.
201	William Lucas	D	VA-15	March 4, 1839	1st term	Left the House in 1841.
202	Joshua A. Lowell	D	ME-07	March 4, 1839	1st term	
203	Meredith Mallory	D	NY-27	March 4, 1839	1st term	Left the House in 1841.
204	Albert Gallatin Marchand	D	PA-19	March 4, 1839	1st term	
205	William Medill	D	OH-09	March 4, 1839	1st term	
206	Christopher Morgan	W	NY-24	March 4, 1839	1st term	
207	James Monroe	W	NY-03	March 4, 1839	1st term	Left the House in 1841.
208	James De La Montanya	D	NY-02	March 4, 1839	1st term	Left the House in 1841.
209	Peter Newhard	D	PA-08	March 4, 1839	1st term	
210	Eugenius Aristides Nisbet	W	GA	March 4, 1839	1st term	
211	Thomas Burr Osborne	W	CT-04	March 4, 1839	1st term	
212	Rufus Palen	W	NY-07	March 4, 1839	1st term	Left the House in 1841.
213	Isaac Parrish	D	OH-11	March 4, 1839	1st term	Left the House in 1841.
214	George H. Proffit	W	IN-01	March 4, 1839	1st term	
215	William Sterrett Ramsey	D	PA-13	March 4, 1839	1st term	Died on October 17, 1840.
216	Benjamin Randall	W	ME-03	March 4, 1839	1st term	
217	Kenneth Rayner	W	NC-01	March 4, 1839	1st term	
218	John Reynolds	D	IL-01	March 4, 1839; Previous service, 1834–1837.	3rd term*	
219	Thomas Robinson Jr.	D	DE	March 4, 1839	1st term	Left the House in 1841.
220	Edward Rogers	D	NY-23	March 4, 1839	1st term	Left the House in 1841.
221	James Rogers	D	SC-07	March 4, 1839; Previous service, 1835–1837.	2nd term*	
222	Daniel Bailey Ryall	D	NJ	March 4, 1839	1st term	Left the House in 1841.
223	Green Berry Samuels	D	VA-16	March 4, 1839	1st term	Left the House in 1841.
224	Jonathan Taylor	D	OH-12	March 4, 1839	1st term	Left the House in 1841.
225	Tristram Shaw	D	NH	March 4, 1839	1st term	Left the House in 1841.
226	William Simonton	W	PA-10	March 4, 1839	1st term	
227	Albert Smith	D	ME-02	March 4, 1839	1st term	Left the House in 1841.
228	John Smith	D	VT-04	March 4, 1839	1st term	Left the House in 1841.
229	Thomas Smith	D	IN-04	March 4, 1839	1st term	Left the House in 1841.
230	Truman Smith	W	CT-05	March 4, 1839	1st term	
231	David A. Starkweather	D	OH-18	March 4, 1839	1st term	Left the House in 1841.
232	Lewis Steenrod	D	VA-21	March 4, 1839	1st term	
233	George Sweeny	D	OH-14	March 4, 1839	1st term	
234	William L. Storrs	W	CT-02	March 4, 1839; Previous service, 1829–1833.	3rd term*	Resigned in June 1840.
235	Theron R. Strong	D	NY-25	March 4, 1839	1st term	Left the House in 1841.
236	John T. Stuart	W	IL-03	March 4, 1839	1st term	
237	Thomas De Lage Sumter	D	SC-08	March 4, 1839	1st term	
238	Philip Francis Thomas	D	MD-02	March 4, 1839	1st term	Left the House in 1841.
239	Jacob Thompson	D	MS	March 4, 1839	1st term	
240	Philip Triplett	W	KY-02	March 4, 1839	1st term	
241	Joseph Trumbull	W	CT-01	March 4, 1839; Previous service, 1834–1835.	2nd term*	
242	Aaron Vanderpoel	D	NY-08	March 4, 1839; Previous service, 1833–1837.	3rd term*	Left the House in 1841.
243	Peter Dumont Vroom	D	NJ	March 4, 1839	1st term	Left the House in 1841.
244	Peter Joseph Wagner	W	NY-15	March 4, 1839	1st term	Left the House in 1841.
245	Lott Warren	W	GA	March 4, 1839	1st term	
246	Harvey Magee Watterson	D	TN-09	March 4, 1839	1st term	
247	John B. Weller	D	OH-02	March 4, 1839	1st term	
248	Edward D. White Sr.	W	LA-01	March 4, 1839; Previous service, 1829–1834.	4th term*	
249	William W. Wick	D	IN-06	March 4, 1839	1st term	Left the House in 1841.
250	Henry Williams	D	MA-10	March 4, 1839	1st term	Left the House in 1841.
251	Thomas Wheeler Williams	W	CT-03	March 4, 1839	1st term	
	Tilghman Howard	D	IN-07	August 5, 1839	1st term	Resigned on July 1, 1840.
	George McCulloch	D	PA-14	November 20, 1839	1st term	Left the House in 1841.
	John Jameson	D	MO	December 12, 1839	1st term	Left the House in 1841.
	Osmyn Baker	W	MA-06	January 14, 1840	1st term	
	William M. McCarty	W	VA-14	January 25, 1840	1st term	Left the House in 1841.
	Henry S. Lane	W	IN-07	August 3, 1840	1st term	
	Henry Marie Brackenridge	W	PA-22	October 13, 1840	1st term	Left the House in 1841.
	Jeremiah Morrow	W	OH-04	October 13, 1840; Previous service, 1803–1813.	7th term*	
	Robert Charles Winthrop	W	MA-01	November 9, 1840	1st term	
	William Whiting Boardman	W	CT-02	December 7, 1840	1st term	
	Nicholas B. Doe	W	NY-11	December 7, 1840	1st term	Left the House in 1841.
	Charles McClure	D	PA-13	December 7, 1840; Previous service, 1837–1839.	2nd term*	Left the House in 1841.
	John B. Thompson	W	KY-05	December 7, 1840	1st term	
	John Moore	W	LA-03	December 17, 1840	1st term	
	Francis Mallory	W	VA-01	December 28, 1840; Previous service, 1837–1839.	2nd term*	
	Hines Holt	W	GA	February 1, 1841	1st term	Left the House in 1841.

== Delegates ==
Rank	Delegate	Party	District	Seniority date (previous service, if any)	No. of term(s)	Notes
1	Charles Downing	D	FL	March 4, 1837	2nd term	
2	William W. Chapman	D	IA	September 10, 1838	2nd term	
3	James Duane Doty	D	WI	January 14, 1839	2nd term	
	Augustus C. Dodge	D	IA	October 28, 1840	1st term	

== See also ==
- 26th United States Congress
- List of United States congressional districts
- List of United States senators in the 26th Congress
