= Bennet Bicknell =

American politician (1781–1841)

Member of the U.S. House of Representatives from New York's 23rd district
- In office March 4, 1837 – March 3, 1839
- Preceded by: William Taylor
- Succeeded by: Nehemiah H. Earll Edward Rogers

Member of the New York Senate
- In office January 1, 1814 – December 31, 1818

Member of the New York State Assembly
- In office January 1, 1812 – December 31, 1812

Personal details
- Born: November 14, 1781 Mansfield, Connecticut, US
- Died: September 15, 1841 (aged 59) Morrisville, New York, US
- Party: Democratic Party
- Spouse: Lucinda Crane Bicknell
- Children: 4
- Profession: politician newspaper editor

Military service
- Battles/wars: War of 1812

Bennet Bicknell (November 14, 1781 – September 15, 1841) was an American War of 1812 veteran and politician who served one term as a U.S. representative from New York from 1837 to 1839.

== Biography ==
Born in Mansfield, Connecticut, Bicknell attended the public schools. He married Lucinda Crane and they had four children.

== Career ==
Bicknell moved to Morrisville, New York, in 1808, and served in the War of 1812.

=== Political career ===
He served as member of the New York State Assembly in 1812 and served in the New York State Senate from 1814 to 1818. He served as clerk of Madison County, New York from 1821 to 1825, and was editor of the Madison Observer.

=== Congress ===
Elected as a Democrat to the Twenty-fifth Congress, Bicknell was United States Representative for the twenty-third district of New York from March 4, 1837 to March 3, 1839. He was an unsuccessful candidate for reelection in 1838 to the Twenty-sixth Congress.

== Death ==
Bicknell died in Morrisville, Madison County, New York, on September 15, 1841 (age 59 years, 305 days). He is interred at Morrisville Rural Cemetery.

U.S. House of Representatives
Preceded by William Taylor	Member of the U.S. House of Representatives from New York's 23rd congressional district March 4, 1837 – March 3, 1839	Succeeded by Nehemiah H. Earll Edward Rogers
