= Mottville =

Mottville may refer to:

- Mottville, New York (a hamlet in the Town of Skaneateles)
- Mottville Township, Michigan
