= John I. De Graff =

American politician

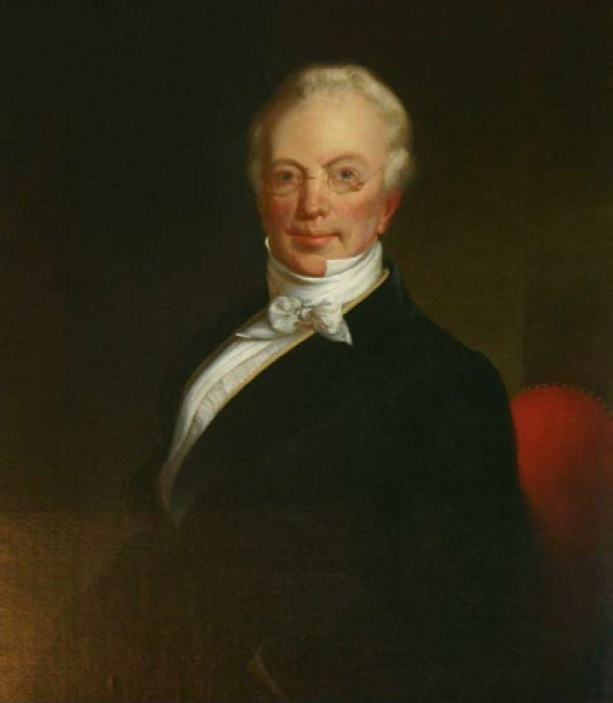

Mayor of Schenectady
- In office 1845–1846
- In office 1842–1843

Member of the United States House of Representatives from New York
- In office March 4, 1837 – March 3, 1839
- Preceded by: John Cramer
- Succeeded by: Anson Brown
- Constituency: 11th district
- In office March 4, 1827 – March 3, 1829
- Preceded by: William Dietz
- Succeeded by: Peter I. Borst
- Constituency: 12th district

Mayor of Schenectady
- In office 1836–1837
- In office 1832–1835

Personal details
- Born: October 2, 1783 Schenectady, New York
- Died: July 26, 1848 (aged 64) Schenectady
- Party: Jacksonian; Democratic
- Education: Union College

Military service
- Allegiance: New York
- Branch/service: New York militia
- Years of service: early 1800s
- Rank: Ensign
- Unit: Schenectady regiment

John Isaac De Graff (October 2, 1783 – July 26, 1848) was an American businessman and politician who served two non-consecutive term as a U.S. Representative from New York 1827 to 1829, and again from 1837 to 1839.

== Biography ==
De Graff was born in Schenectady, New York, the son of American Revolution veteran Judge Isaac DeGraff and Susanna Van Epps, and he attended the common schools and the Schenectady Academy, a school operated by Schenectady's Dutch Reformed Church. He engaged in mercantile pursuits and banking in Schenectady, and his firm prospered, maintaining offices in London and Paris. He was also a successful real estate investor and landlord, and owned several houses, farms, commercial buildings and pastures in and around Schenectady.

=== Militia ===
In the early 1800s De Graff served in the militia, and was appointed an Ensign in the Schenectady regiment commanded by Jacob Swits.

He attended Union College in 1811, and was a member of Phi Beta Kappa.

=== War of 1812 ===
He played a key role in the War of 1812 by lending the government money to use in equipping a naval fleet. He pledged both private funds and his personal credit to the amount of $100,000 (about $1.1 million in 2015), and with this financing Thomas Macdonough was able to build and outfit the ships he used to defeat the British at the Battle of Plattsburgh. Due to the depreciation of the treasury notes with which he was repaid, De Graff lost about $30,000 (about $330,000 in 2015) in aiding the war effort.

=== Political career ===
De Graff was elected as a Jacksonian to the Twentieth Congress (March 4, 1827 – March 3, 1829).

He served as mayor of Schenectady from 1832 to 1835 and again from 1836 to 1837. In 1834 De Graff became the first popularly elected Mayor, because prior holders of the office had been appointed by the city council.

In 1837 De Graff was one of the incorporators of the Schenectady Lyceum and Academy, a boarding school for boys, and he served on its original board of trustees. As Mayor he oversaw the setting aside of land for and construction of a school for African Americans, and as President of Schenectady's school trustees in the 1840s he included details on Schenectady's African School in his annual report to the state superintendent of common schools.

De Graff was elected as a Democrat to the Twenty-fifth Congress (March 4, 1837 – March 3, 1839).

He was not a candidate for renomination, and declined appointment as Secretary of the Treasury in the administration of Martin Van Buren. He resumed his business activities, and was interested in the building of the Mohawk & Hudson Railroad, of which he was the first President.

In 1840 De Graff was a candidate for the New York State Assembly. He appeared to be defeated on election day, but contested the results. He presented evidence to support his charge that the ballots of Schenectady's second ward had been tampered with, and that the fraud was sufficient to have affected the outcome, but the Assembly voted to seat Theodore W. Sanders, the Whig nominee.

He again served as mayor of Schenectady from 1842 to 1843 and 1845 to 1846.

=== Later career and death ===
He engaged in banking and business ventures until his death. He never married, and he died in Schenectady on July 26, 1848. He was interred in Vale Cemetery.

U.S. House of Representatives
Preceded by William Dietz	Member of the U.S. House of Representatives from New York's 12th congressional district 1827–1829	Succeeded by Peter I. Borst
Preceded by John Cramer	Member of the U.S. House of Representatives from New York's 11th congressional district 1837–1839	Succeeded by Anson Brown
Political offices
Preceded by Archibald Craig	Mayor of Schenectady, New York; 1832 - 1835	Succeeded by Archibald L. Linn
Preceded by Archibald L. Linn	Mayor of Schenectady, New York; 1836 - 1837	Succeeded by Samuel W. Jones
Preceded by Alexander C. Gibson	Mayor of Schenectady, New York; 1842 - 1843	Succeeded by Alexander C. Gibson
Preceded by Alexander C. Gibson	Mayor of Schenectady, New York; 1845 - 1846	Succeeded by Peter Rowe
