= List of United States senators in the 26th Congress =

This is a complete list of United States senators during the 26th United States Congress listed by seniority from March 4, 1839, to March 3, 1841.

Order of service is based on the commencement of the senator's first term. Behind this is former service as a senator (only giving the senator seniority within their new incoming class), service as vice president, a House member, a cabinet secretary, or a governor of a state. The final factor is the population of the senator's state.

Senators who were sworn in during the middle of the two-year congressional term (up until the last senator who was not sworn in early after winning the November 1840 election) are listed at the end of the list with no number.

== Terms of service ==
Class	Terms of service of senators that expired in years
Class 2	Terms of service of senators that expired in 1841 (AL, AR, DE, GA, IL, KY, LA, MA, ME, MI, MN, MS, NC, NH, NJ, RI, SC, TN, and VA.)
Class 3	Terms of service of senators that expired in 1843 (CT, DE, IN, MA, MD, ME, MI, MN, MO, MS, NJ, NY, OH, PA, RI, TN, VA, and VT.)
Class 1	Terms of service of senators that expired in 1845 (AL, AR, CT, GA, IL, IN, KY, LA, MD, MO, NC, NH, NY, OH, PA, SC, and VT.)

== U.S. Senate seniority list ==
U.S. Senate seniority
Rank	Senator (party-state)	Seniority date	Other factors
1	William Rufus de Vane King (D-AL)	December 14, 1819	
2	Nehemiah Rice Knight (W-RI)	January 9, 1821	
3	Thomas Hart Benton (D-MO)	August 10, 1821	
4	Hugh Lawson White (W-TN)	October 28, 1825	
5	Daniel Webster (W-MA)	June 8, 1827	
6	Bedford Brown (D-NC)	December 9, 1829	
7	John McCracken Robinson (D-IL)	December 11, 1830	
8	Samuel Prentiss (AJ-VT)	March 4, 1831	
9	Henry Clay (W-KY)	November 10, 1831	
10	John Caldwell Calhoun (D-SC)	December 29, 1832	
11	Silas Wright, Jr. (D-NY)	January 4, 1833	
12	Samuel Lewis Southard (W-NJ)	March 4, 1833	Former senator
13	Nathaniel Pitcher Tallmadge (W-NY)	March 4, 1833	
14	Lewis Fields Linn (D-MO)	October 25, 1833	
15	William Campbell Preston (N-SC)	November 26, 1833	
16	James Buchanan (D-PA)	December 6, 1834	
17	Alfred Cuthbert (D-MD)	January 12, 1835	
18	John Ruggles (D-ME)	January 20, 1835	
19	John Jordan Crittenden (W-KY)	March 4, 1835	Former senator
20	Henry Hubbard (D-NH)	March 4, 1835	Former representative
21	John Davis (W-MA)	March 4, 1835	Former governor
22	Garret Dorset Wall (D-NJ)	March 4, 1835	New Jersey 14th in population (1830)
23	Robert John Walker (D-MS)	March 4, 1835	Mississippi 22nd in population (1830)
24	Robert Carter Nicholas (D-LA)	January 13, 1836	
25	William Cabell Rives (W-VA)	March 4, 1836	
26	Richard Henry Bayard (AJ-DE)	June 17, 1836	
27	Ambrose Hundley Sevier (D-AR)	September 18, 1836	Former delegate
28	William Savin Fulton (D-AR)	September 18, 1836	
29	Robert Strange (D-NC)	December 5, 1836	
30	John Selby Spence (W-MD)	December 31, 1836	
31	Thomas Clayton (W-DE)	January 9, 1837	
32	Alexander Mouton (D-LA)	January 12, 1837	
33	John Norvell (D-MI)	January 26, 1837	
34	Franklin Pierce (D-NH)	March 4, 1837	Former representative (4 years)
35	William Allen (D-OH)	March 4, 1837	Former representative (2 years); Ohio 5th in population (1830)
36	Oliver Hampton Smith (W-IN)	March 4, 1837	Former representative (2 years); Indiana 13th in population (1830)
37	Reuel Williams (D-ME)	March 4, 1837	Maine 12th in population (1830)
38	Perry Smith (D-CT)	March 4, 1837	Connecticut 16th in population (1830)
39	Richard Montgomery Young (D-IL)	March 4, 1837	Illinois 20th in population (1830)
40	William Henry Roane (D-VA)	March 14, 1837	
41	Clement Comer Clay (D-AL)	June 19, 1837	
42	Wilson Lumpkin (D-GA)	November 22, 1837	
43	William Duhurst Merrick (W-MD)	January 4, 1838	
44	Albert Smith White (W-IN)	March 4, 1839	Former representative
45	Benjamin Tappan (D-OH)	March 4, 1839	Ohio 5th in population (1830)
46	Thaddeus Betts (W-CT)	March 4, 1839	Connecticut 16th in population (1830)
47	Samuel Shethar Phelps (W-VT)	March 4, 1839	Vermont 17th in population (1830)
48	John Henderson (W-MS)	March 4, 1839	Mississippi 22nd in population (1830)
49	Nathan Fellows Dixon (W-RI)	March 4, 1839	Rhode Island 23rd in population (1830)
50	Felix Grundy (D-TN)	December 14, 1839	
51	Daniel Sturgeon (D-PA)	January 14, 1840	
52	Augustus Seymour Porter (W-MI)	January 20, 1840	
	Alexander Outlaw Anderson (D-TN)	February 26, 1840	
	Jabez Williams Huntington (W-CT)	May 4, 1840	
	Willie Person Mangum (W-NC)	November 25, 1840	Former senator
	William Alexander Graham (W-NC)	November 25, 1840	
	Alfred Osborn Pope Nicholson (D-TN)	December 25, 1840	
	John Leeds Kerr (W-MD)	January 5, 1841	
	Isaac Chapman Bates (W-MA)	January 13, 1841	
	Rufus Choate (W-MA)	February 23, 1841	

== See also ==
- 26th United States Congress
- List of United States representatives in the 26th Congress
