= Freeborn G. Jewett =

American judge

Freeborn Jewett
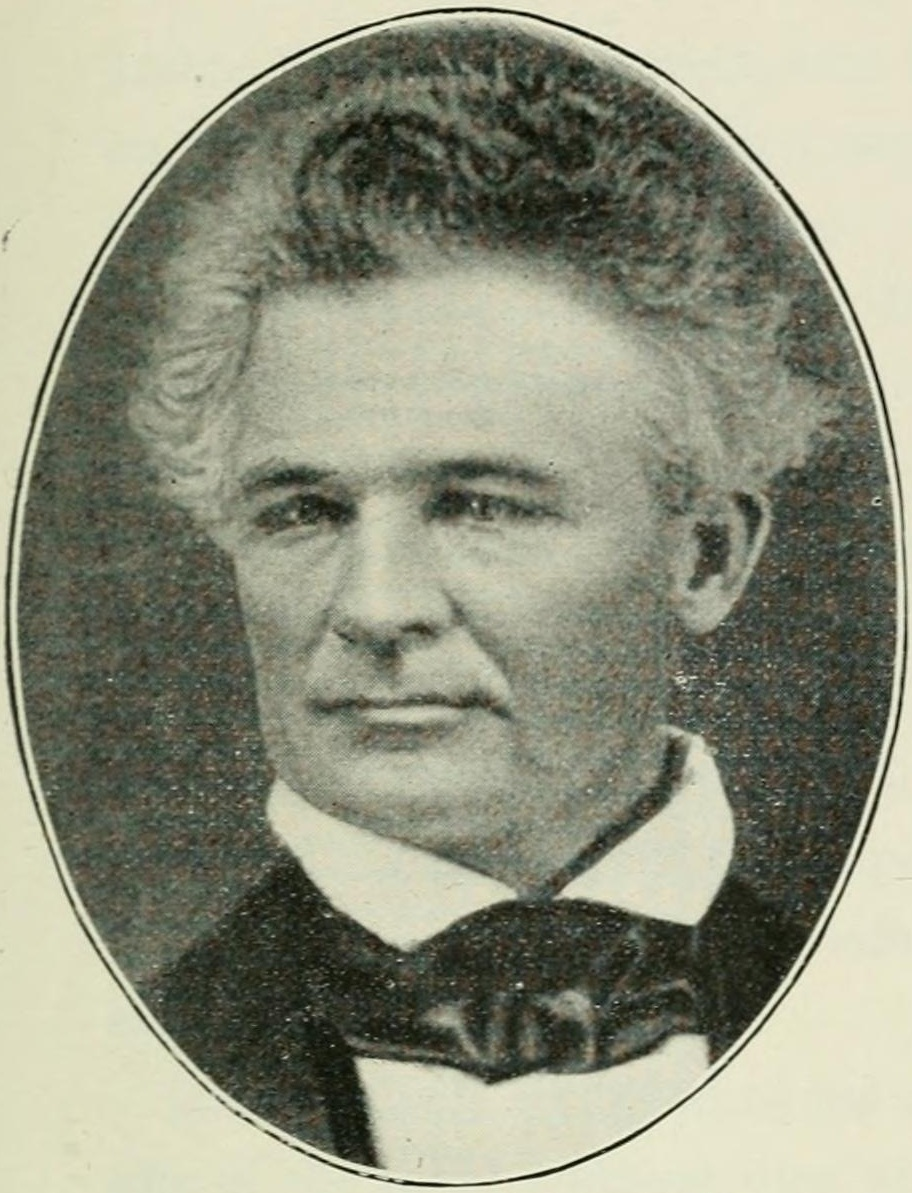

President of the Village of Skaneatles, New York
- In office 1835–1836
- Preceded by: Daniel Kellogg
- Succeeded by: Phares Gould
- In office 1834–1835
- Preceded by: None (position created)
- Succeeded by: Daniel Kellogg

Member of the U.S. House of Representatives from New York's 23rd district
- In office March 4, 1831 – March 3, 1833
- Preceded by: Jonas Earll Jr.
- Succeeded by: William K. Fuller

Personal details
- Born: Freeborn Garrettson Jewett; August 4, 1791 Sharon, Litchfield County, Connecticut, U.S.
- Died: January 27, 1858 (aged 66) Skaneateles, Onondaga County, New York, U.S.
- Resting place: Lake View Cemetery, Skaneateles, New York
- Spouse: Fannie Warner (m. 1814)
- Children: 1
- Profession: Attorney

Freeborn Garrettson Jewett (August 4, 1791 – January 27, 1858) was an American lawyer and politician who served as a U.S. representative from New York and was the first chief judge of the New York Court of Appeals.

== Life ==
Jewett was born in Sharon, Connecticut on August 4, 1791, a son of Abigail Sears Jewett and Alpheus Jewett. He moved to Skaneateles in 1815, and was appointed a Justice of the Peace in 1817. He studied law, first with Henry Swift of Dutchess County, then with Samuel Young of Ballston Spa. He was admitted to the bar in 1818 and commenced practice in Skaneateles as the partner of James Porter. From 1824 to 1831 he was Surrogate of Onondaga County.

=== Political career ===
He was a member of Onondaga County of the New York State Assembly in 1826. He was a presidential elector in 1828.

=== Congress ===
Jewett was elected as a Jacksonian to the 22nd United States Congress, holding office from March 4, 1831 to March 3, 1833.

He was Inspector of Auburn Prison in 1838 and 1839, and District Attorney of Onondaga County in 1839. He was appointed an associate justice of the New York Supreme Court on March 5, 1845.

=== Judge ===
On June 7, 1847, Jewett was elected one of the first judges of the New York State Court of Appeals. On June 22, he drew the shortest term (2 years and a half), and when the judges took office on July 5, he became the first Chief Judge.

He was re-elected in 1849 to an eight-year term, but resigned in June 1853 on account of ill health.

=== Death ===
He was buried at Lake View Cemetery in Skaneateles.

== Legacy ==
Justice Jewett is the namesake of Jewett, New York.

== Notes and references ==
- Political Graveyard
- United States Congress. "Freeborn G. Jewett (id: J000104)". Biographical Directory of the United States Congress.
- The New York Civil List compiled by Franklin Benjamin Hough (pages 284, 348 and 415; Weed, Parsons and Co., 1858)
- Obit in NYT on January 30, 1858 (giving wrong middle initial "J.", and almost all years given are wrong)

U.S. House of Representatives
Preceded by Jonas Earll, Jr.	Member of the U.S. House of Representatives from New York's 23rd congressional district 1831–1833	Succeeded by William K. Fuller, William Taylor
Legal offices
Preceded by Reuben H. Walworth as Chancellor of New York	Chief Judge of the New York Court of Appeals; 1847–1849	Succeeded by Greene C. Bronson
