= A. Lawrence Foster =

American politician (1802–1877)

Member of the U.S. House of Representatives from New York's 23rd district
- In office March 4, 1841 – March 3, 1843 Serving with Victory Birdseye
- Preceded by: Nehemiah H. Earll; Edward Rogers
- Succeeded by: Orville Robinson

Personal details
- Born: Abel Lawrence Foster; September 17, 1802 Littleton, Massachusetts, U.S.
- Died: May 21, 1877 (aged 74) Washington, D.C., U.S.
- Resting place: Glenwood Cemetery, Washington, D.C., U.S.
- Party: Whig
- Profession: Politician, lawyer

Abel Lawrence Foster (September 17, 1802 – May 21, 1877) was an American lawyer who was a United States representative from New York for one term, from 1841 to 1843.

== Biography ==
A. Lawrence Foster was born on September 17, 1802, in Littleton, Massachusetts. He studied law in Vernon, New York, was admitted to the bar and commenced practice in Morrisville, New York, in 1827.

=== Congress ===
Foster ran unsuccessfully for Congress in 1838. In 1840, he was elected as a Whig to the Twenty-seventh Congress (March 4, 1841, to March 3, 1843). During his term, Foster was Chairman of the Committee on Expenditures in the Department of the Treasury. He did not run for reelection in 1842.

=== Later career ===
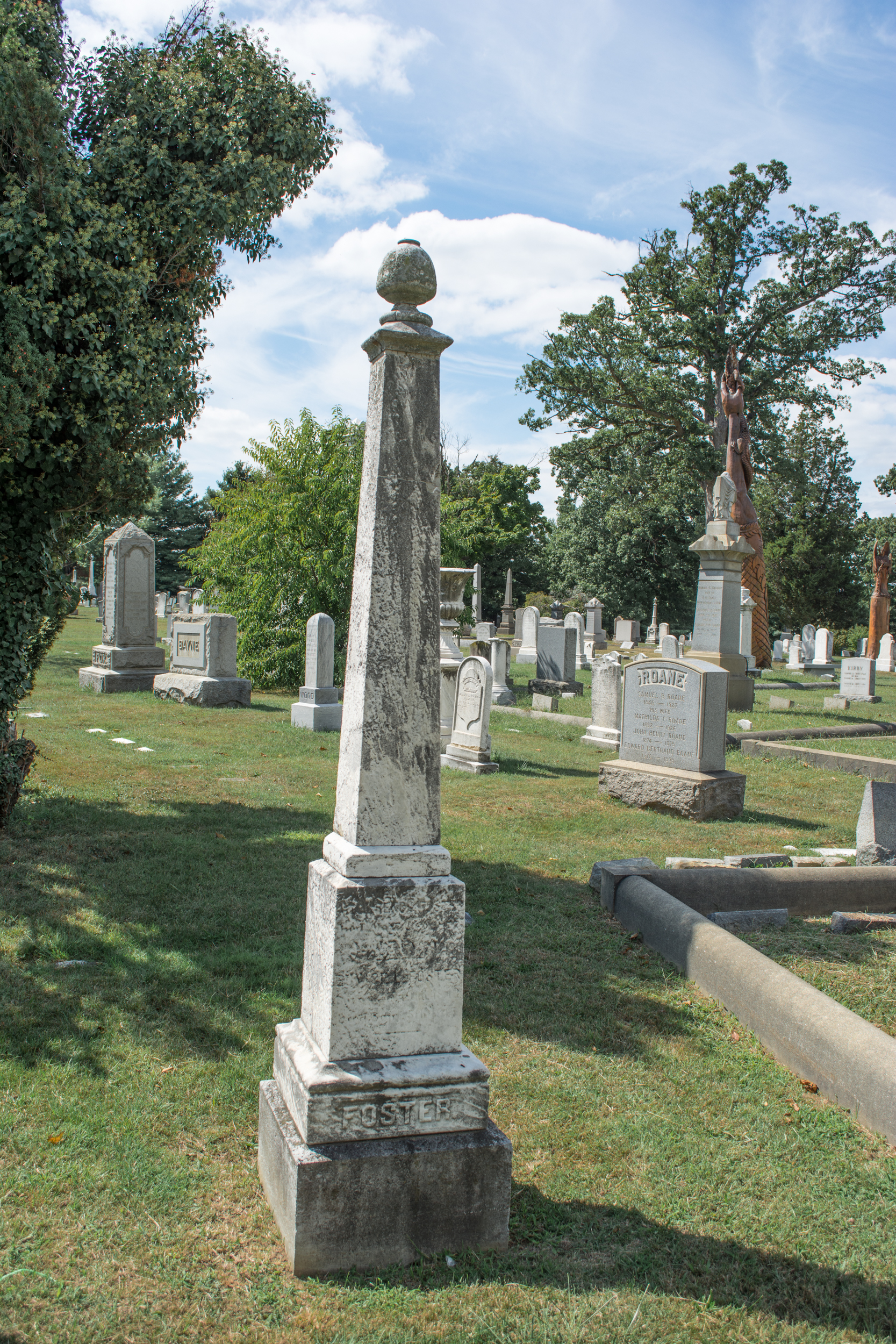
Memorial marker over the grave of A. Lawrence Foster at Glenwood Cemetery.

In 1844, he moved to a farm in Fairfax, Virginia, which included the land that is now Tysons Corner. In the 1850s, he served as a Fairfax County Commissioner.

During the Civil War Foster supported the Union, and relocated temporarily to Washington, D.C. In 1862, he was appointed U.S. Indian Agent for the Chippewa of the Mississippi in Minnesota.

After the Civil War he returned to Fairfax, and was appointed one of three U.S. Tax Commissioners for the northern part of the state after Virginia was readmitted to the Union. In this capacity he was responsible for the sale to the federal government of the Robert E. Lee estate, which is now Arlington National Cemetery.

=== Death and burial ===
Foster's health began to fail in the 1870s, after which he resided in Washington, D.C. He died there on May 21, 1877, and was buried in Glenwood Cemetery.

=== Legacy ===
In the 1890s, his heirs petitioned Congress to compensate them nearly $29,000 (over $712,000 in 2009) for Foster's property and supplies that were used by the Union Army or destroyed by the Confederacy. In the early 1900s the United States Court of Claims authorized partial payment to resolve the case.

U.S. House of Representatives
Preceded by Nehemiah H. Earll, Edward Rogers	Member of the U.S. House of Representatives from New York's 23rd congressional district 1841–1843 with Victory Birdseye	Succeeded by Orville Robinson
