= William Taylor (New York politician) =

American politician (1791–1865)

Member of the U.S. House of Representatives from New York's 23rd district
- In office March 4, 1833 – March 3, 1839
- Preceded by: William K. Fuller
- Succeeded by: Nehemiah H. Earll

Personal details
- Born: October 12, 1791 Suffield, Connecticut, U.S.
- Died: September 16, 1865 (aged 73) Manlius, New York, U.S.
- Resting place: Christ Church Cemetery, Manlius, New York, U.S.
- Party: Democratic
- Other political affiliations: Jacksonian
- Profession: Politician, physician

William Taylor (October 12, 1791 – September 16, 1865) was an American medical doctor and politician who served three terms as a U.S. representative from New York from 1833 to 1839.

== Biography ==
Born in Suffield, Connecticut, Taylor moved with his parents to Onondaga County, New York. He attended the public schools.

He studied medicine and was admitted to practice.

=== Congress ===
Taylor was elected as a Jacksonian to the Twenty-third and Twenty-fourth Congresses and reelected as a Democrat to the Twenty-fifth Congress (March 4, 1833 – March 3, 1839). He served as chairman of the Committee on Invalid Pensions (Twenty-fifth Congress).

=== Later career ===
He resumed the practice of his chosen profession. He served as member of the state assembly in 1841 and 1842. He served as delegate to the state constitutional convention in 1846.

=== Death and burial ===
He died in Manlius, New York, September 16, 1865. He was interred in Christ Church Cemetery.

== Sources ==
U.S. House of Representatives
Preceded by William K. Fuller	Member of the U.S. House of Representatives from New York's 23rd congressional district 1833–1839	Succeeded by Nehemiah H. Earll
