= Archibald Atkinson =

American politician

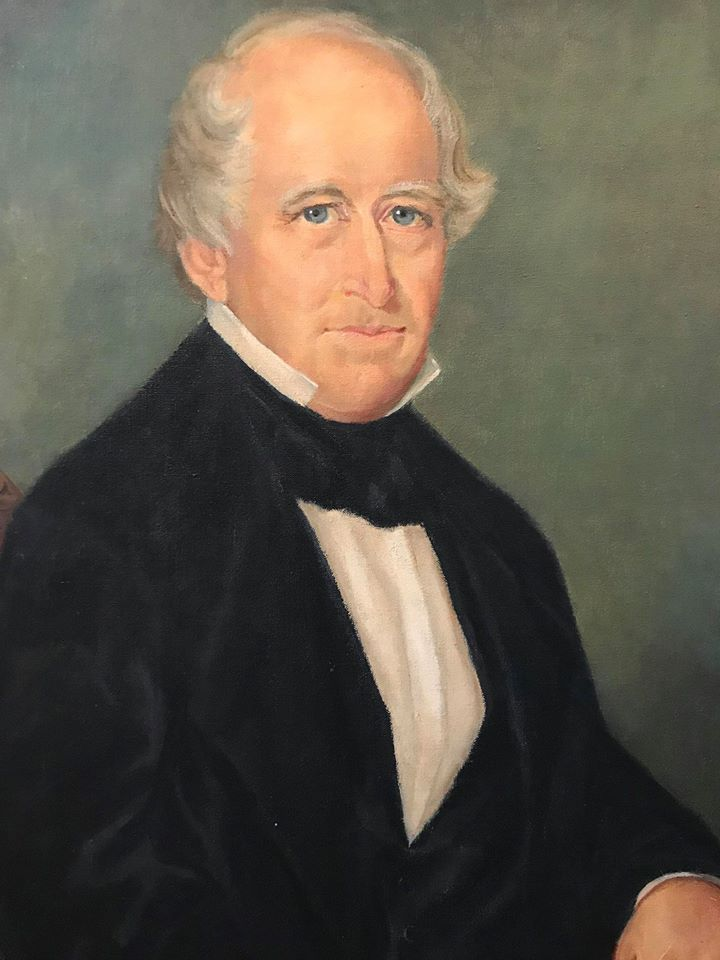

Member of the U.S. House of Representatives from Virginia's 1st district
- In office March 4, 1843 – March 3, 1849
- Preceded by: Francis Mallory
- Succeeded by: John Millson

Member of the Virginia Senate from Isle of Wight, Prince George, Southampton, Surry and Sussex Counties
- In office 1839–1843
- Preceded by: Joel Holleman
- Succeeded by: William Spark

Member of the Virginia House of Delegates from Isle of Wight County
- In office 1828–1830
- Preceded by: John Chapman
- Succeeded by: James Jordon
- In office 1815–1816; Alongside John Lawrence

Personal details
- Born: September 15, 1792 Isle of Wight County, Virginia
- Died: January 7, 1872 (aged 79) Smithfield, Virginia
- Resting place: Old St. Luke's Church
- Party: Democratic
- Education: College of William and Mary
- Profession: lawyer, legislator

Military service
- Allegiance: United States of America
- Battles/wars: War of 1812

Archibald Atkinson (September 15, 1792 – January 7, 1872) was an American lawyer and slave owner who served three terms as a U.S. representative from Virginia from 1843 to 1849. He was a veteran of the War of 1812.

== Biography ==
Born in Isle of Wight County, Virginia, Atkinson received a liberal education.

=== Education and early career ===
He attended the law department of the College of William & Mary (now William & Mary Law School), Williamsburg, Virginia.

He served during the War of 1812 and was later admitted to the bar and commenced practice in Smithfield, Virginia.

=== Virginia legislature ===
He was a member of the Virginia House of Delegates from 1815 to 1817 and from 1828 to 1831, and served in the Virginia Senate from 1839 to 1843.

=== Congress ===
Atkinson was elected as a Democrat to the Twenty-eighth, Twenty-ninth, and Thirtieth Congresses (March 4, 1843 – March 3, 1849). He was not a candidate for renomination in 1848 to the Thirty-first Congress.

In a valedictory speech to Congress in 1849, he described slavery as a "positive moral good" for those enslaved, claimed that the "well-fed, well-clad, contented negro of Virginia asks not your sympathy for him," and falsely claimed that slaves would rise up against abolitionists.

=== Later career and death ===
He served as prosecuting attorney for Isle of Wight County.

He died in Smithfield, Virginia, on January 7, 1872. He was interred in the graveyard of Old St. Luke's Church, four miles southeast of Smithfield.

== Elections ==
- 1841; Atkinson lost his first election for the U.S. House of Representatives; he was defeated by Whig Francis Mallory, winning only 11.26% of the vote.
- 1843; Atkinson was first elected to the U.S. House of Representatives with 50.07% of the vote, defeating Whig James E. Langhorne.
- 1845; Atkinson was re-elected with 55.9% of the vote, defeating Whig R.H. Whitfield.
- 1847; Atkinson was re-elected with 50.82% of the vote, defeating Whig Samuel Watts.

== Sources ==
- United States Congress. "Archibald Atkinson (id: A000328)". Biographical Directory of the United States Congress.

U.S. House of Representatives
Preceded by Francis Mallory	Member of the U.S. House of Representatives from Virginia's 1st congressional district 1843–1849	Succeeded by John S. Millson
