= William K. Fuller =

American politician

Member of the U.S. House of Representatives from New York's 23rd district
- In office March 4, 1833 – March 3, 1837
- Preceded by: Freeborn G. Jewett
- Succeeded by: Bennet Bicknell

Personal details
- Born: William Kendall Fuller; November 24, 1792 Schenectady, New York, U.S.
- Died: November 11, 1881 (aged 88) Schenectady, New York, U.S.
- Resting place: Vale Cemetery

William Kendall Fuller (November 24, 1792 – November 11, 1883) was an American lawyer and politician who served two terms as a U.S. representative from New York from 1833 to 1837.

== Biography ==
Born in Schenectady, New York, Fuller attended the common schools, and graduated from Union College in 1810. He studied law. He was admitted to the bar in 1814 and commenced practice in Schenectady.

He served as district attorney of Madison County 1821–1829. He served as Adjutant General of New York from 1823 to 1824. and was succeeded by Charles G. Haines. He served as member of the State assembly in 1829 and 1830.

=== Congress ===
Fuller was elected as a Jacksonian to the Twenty-third and Twenty-fourth Congresses (March 4, 1833 – March 3, 1837).

=== Later career and death ===
He resumed the practice of law.

He died in Schenectady, New York, on November 11, 1883. He was interred in Vale Cemetery.

U.S. House of Representatives
Preceded by Freeborn G. Jewett	Member of the U.S. House of Representatives from New York's 23rd congressional district March 4, 1833 – March 3, 1837	Succeeded by Bennet Bicknell
