= John Cramer (American politician) =

American politician

New York State Assembly
- In office 1842

Member of the U.S. House of Representatives from New York's 11th district
- In office March 4, 1833 – March 3, 1837
- Preceded by: Erastus Root
- Succeeded by: John I. De Graff

New York State Senate
- In office 1823–1825

New York State Assembly
- In office 1811
- In office 1806

Personal details
- Born: May 17, 1779 Waterford, New York
- Died: June 1, 1870 (aged 91) Waterford, New York
- Other political affiliations: Jacksonian
- Education: Union College

John Cramer was an American lawyer and politician who served two terms as a United States representative from New York from 1833 to 1837.

== Early life and education ==
He was born in Waterford on May 17, 1779.

He attended the rural schools and was graduated from Union College in 1801. He studied law, was admitted to the bar and commenced practice in Waterford. He was a presidential elector on the ticket of Thomas Jefferson and George Clinton in 1804.

== Career ==
Cramer was appointed a master in chancery in 1805, and served as a member of the New York State Assembly in 1806 and 1811.

He served in the New York State Senate, and was a delegate to the State constitutional convention in 1821.

=== Congress ===
He was elected as a Jacksonian to the Twenty-third and Twenty-fourth Congresses (March 4, 1833 – March 3, 1837).

== Later career ==
He served again as a member of the State assembly in 1842.

== Death ==
Cramer died in Waterford on June 1, 1870. His interment was in Waterford Rural Cemetery.

U.S. House of Representatives
Preceded by Erastus Root	Member of the U.S. House of Representatives from New York's 11th congressional district 1833–1837	Succeeded by John I. De Graff
