= Roland Jones =

American politician (1813–1869)

Member of the U.S. House of Representatives from Louisiana's 4th district
- In office March 4, 1853 – March 3, 1855
- Preceded by: John Moore
- Succeeded by: John M. Sandidge

Member of the Louisiana House of Representatives
- In office 1844–1848

District Judge of Caddo Parish
- In office 1851–1852
- In office 1860–1868

Personal details
- Born: November 18, 1813 Salisbury, North Carolina, U.S.
- Died: February 5, 1869 (aged 55) Shreveport, Louisiana, U.S.
- Resting place: Oakland Cemetery, Shreveport, Louisiana
- Party: Democratic
- Education: Cambridge Law School
- Profession: Lawyer, Politician, Judge

Roland Jones (November 18, 1813 – February 5, 1869) was an American politician who represented Louisiana in the United States House of Representatives from 1853 to 1855.

Jones was born in Salisbury, North Carolina where he attended private schools. Later, he taught school in Wilkesboro, North Carolina from 1830 to 1835. He graduated from Cambridge Law School in 1838 and was admitted to the bar and commenced practice in Brandon, Mississippi. He was also editor of the Brandon Republican from 1838 to 1840 before he moved to Shreveport, Louisiana in 1840 and resumed the practice of law.

Jones was a member of the Louisiana House of Representatives from 1844 to 1848 and a district judge of Caddo Parish in 1851 and 1852. He was elected as a Democrat to the Thirty-third Congress (March 4, 1853 – March 3, 1855) but was not a candidate for renomination in 1854. After leaving Congress, he resumed the practice of law. He was again elected district judge in 1860 and served until 1868. He died in Shreveport, Louisiana and was buried in Oakland Cemetery.

U.S. House of Representatives
| Preceded by John Moore | Member of the U.S. House of Representatives from Louisiana's 4th congressional district 1853 – 1855 | Succeeded by John M. Sandidge |
