= Anson Brown =

American politician (1800–1840)

Member of the U.S. House of Representatives from New York's 11th district
- In office March 4, 1839 – June 14, 1840
- Preceded by: John I. De Graff
- Succeeded by: Nicholas B. Doe

Personal details
- Born: 1800 Charlton, New York
- Died: June 14, 1840 (aged 39–40) Ballston Spa, New York
- Party: Whig
- Occupation: attorney

Anson Brown (1800 – June 14, 1840) was a U.S. representative from New York.

Born in Charlton, New York, Brown attended the public schools, and graduated from Union College, Schenectady, New York, in 1819. He studied law, was admitted to the bar and commenced practice in Ballston Spa, New York. He was one of the first directors of the Ballston Spa State Bank (later the Ballston Spa National Bank), which was organized in 1830.

Brown was elected as a Whig to the Twenty-sixth Congress and served from March 4, 1839, until his death in Ballston Spa, June 14, 1840. He was interred in the cemetery of the Ballston Spa Cemetery Association.

== See also ==
- List of members of the United States Congress who died in office (1790–1899)

U.S. House of Representatives
Preceded by John I. De Graff	Member of the U.S. House of Representatives from New York's 11th congressional district 1839 – 1840-06-14	Succeeded by Nicholas B. Doe
