= Hezekiah Gold Rogers =

American diplomat

- Born: Hezekiah Gold Rogers; February 22, 1811; Madison, New York
- Died: March 19, 1882 (aged 71); Lancaster, Pennsylvania
- Education: Yale College

United States chargé d'affaires in Sardinia
- In office September 15, 1840 – November 22, 1841
- Preceded by: Position established
- Succeeded by: Ambrose Baber
- Occupations: Lawyer, delegate, chargé d'affaires, wanderer

Hezekiah Gold Rogers (February 22, 1811 – March 19, 1882) was the United States chargé d'affaires in Sardinia from 1840 to 1841.

Rogers, the eldest child of the Hon. Edward Rogers, member of the United States House of Representatives from New York, and of Sally Maria (Gold) Rogers, was born in Madison, New York, February 22, 1811. He graduated from Yale College in 1831. He studied law and began practice in Pittsburgh, and in 1837 was one of the delegates from Alleghany County to the convention for the revision of the Pennsylvania Constitution. In June 1840, he was appointed chargé d'affaires to the Kingdom of Sardinia by President Martin Van Buren, but showing symptoms of mental derangement he was superseded in November 1841, and returned to his father's house. During his later life he was a wanderer. He died in the county alms-house in Lancaster, Pennsylvania on March 19, 1882, aged 71. He was unmarried.
