= 26th United States Congress =

1839-1841 U.S. Congress

| ← | 25th | 27th | → |
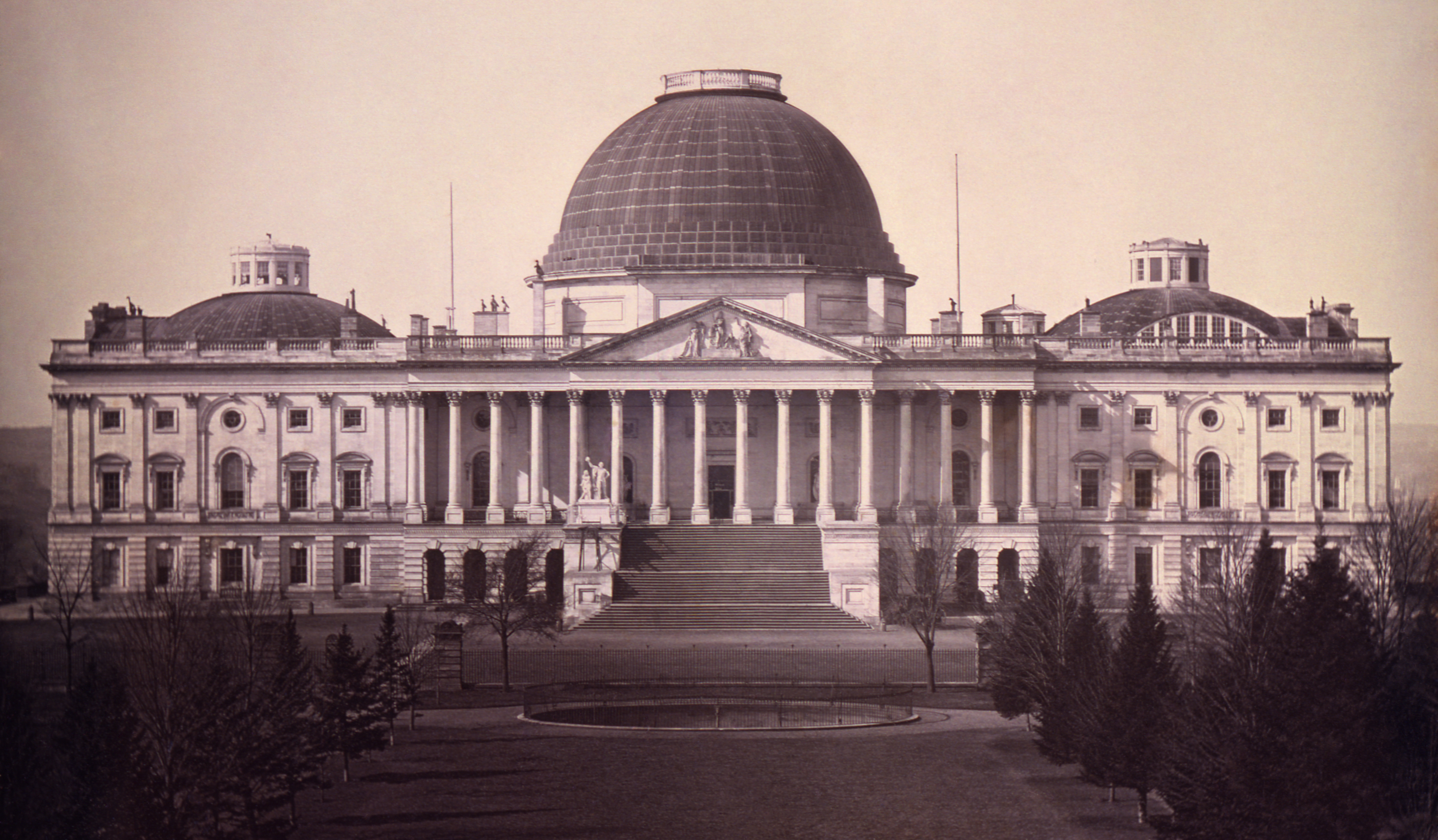
- United States Capitol (1846)

Overview
- Legislative body: United States Congress
- Jurisdiction: United States
- Term: March 4, 1839 – March 4, 1841

Senate
- Members: 52
- President: Richard M. Johnson (D)
- President pro tempore: William R. King (D)
- Party control: Democratic

House of Representatives
- Members: 242 representatives 3 non-voting delegates
- Speaker: Robert M. T. Hunter (W)
- Party control: Democratic

Sessions
- 1st: December 2, 1839 – July 21, 1840
- 2nd: December 7, 1840 – March 3, 1841

The 26th United States Congress was a meeting of the legislative branch of the United States federal government, consisting of the United States Senate and the United States House of Representatives. It met in Washington, D.C., from March 4, 1839, to March 4, 1841, during the third and fourth years of Martin Van Buren's presidency. The apportionment of seats in the House of Representatives was based on the 1830 United States census. Both chambers had a Democratic majority.

== Major events ==
- 1839: The first state law permitting women to own property was passed in Jackson, Mississippi
- December 14–16, 1839: An election for the House speakership takes 11 ballots
- January 19, 1840: Captain Charles Wilkes circumnavigated Antarctica, claiming what becomes known as Wilkes Land for the United States.
- November 7, 1840: 1840 United States presidential election: William Henry Harrison defeated Martin Van Buren
- February 18, 1841: The first ongoing filibuster in the United States Senate began and lasted until March 11

== Major legislation ==
- The Independent Treasury Act
- The Census Act Amendments

== Party summary ==
=== Senate ===
| | Party (shading shows control) | | Total | Vacant |
| | Democratic (D) | Whig (W) | Total | Vacant |
|---|---|---|---|---|
| End of previous congress | 35 | 16 | 51 | 1 |
| Begin | 28 | 19 | 47 | 5 |
| End | 29 | 23 | 52 | 0 |
| Final voting share | 55.8% | 44.2% | | |
| Beginning of next congress | 22 | 29 | 51 | 1 |

=== House of Representatives ===
| | Party (shading shows control) | | | | | Total | Vacant |
| | Anti- Masonic (AM) | Conservative (C) | Democratic (D) | Whig (W) | Other | Total | Vacant |
|---|---|---|---|---|---|---|---|
| End of previous congress | 7 | 0 | 123 | 106 | 4 (Note: Nullifer) | 240 | 2 |
| Begin | 6 | 2 | 125 | 109 | 0 | 242 | 0 |
| End | 5 | 2 | 123 | 111 | 0 | 241 | 1 |
| Final voting share | 2.1% | 0.8% | 51.0% | 46.1% | 0.0% | | |
| Beginning of next congress | 0 | 0 | 99 | 142 | 1 | 242 | 0 |

== Leadership ==
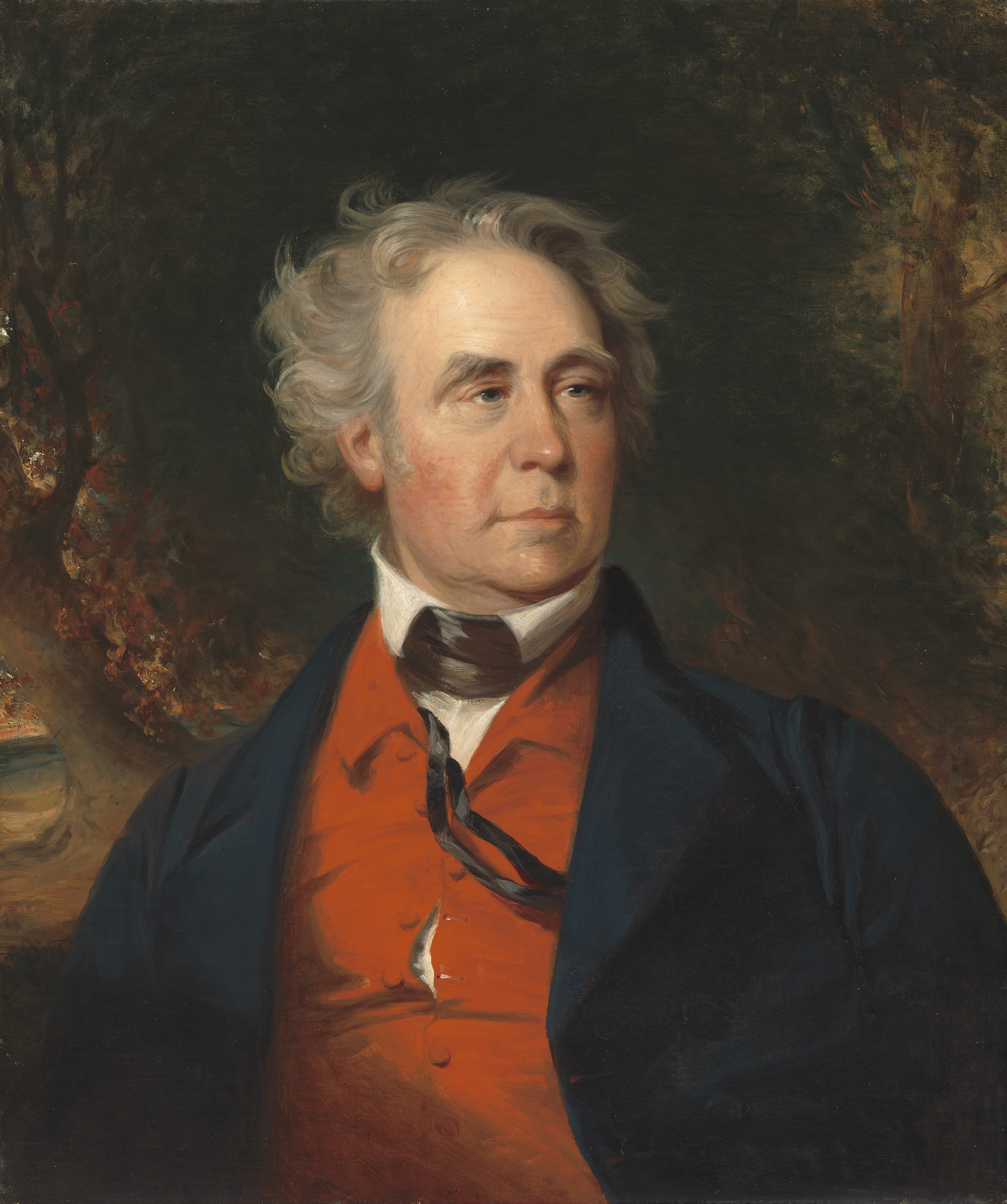
President of the Senate Richard M. Johnson

=== Senate ===
- President: Richard M. Johnson (D)
- President pro tempore: William R. King (D)

=== House of Representatives ===
- Speaker: Robert M. T. Hunter (W) elected December 16, 1839, on the 11th ballot

== Members ==
This list is arranged by chamber, then by state. Senators are listed by class, and representatives are listed by district.

Skip to House of Representatives, below

=== Senate ===
Senators were elected by the state legislatures every two years, with one-third beginning new six-year terms with each Congress. Preceding the names in the list below are Senate class numbers, which indicate the cycle of their election. In this Congress, Class 1 meant their term began with this Congress, requiring reelection in 1844; Class 2 meant their term ended with this Congress, requiring reelection in 1840; and Class 3 meant their term began in the last Congress, requiring reelection in 1842.

==== Alabama ====
▌2. William R. King (D)
▌3. Clement C. Clay (D)

==== Arkansas ====
▌2. William S. Fulton (D)
▌3. Ambrose H. Sevier (D)

==== Connecticut ====
▌1. Thaddeus Betts (W), until April 7, 1840

▌Jabez W. Huntington (W), from May 4, 1840

▌3. Perry Smith (D)

==== Delaware ====
▌1. Richard H. Bayard (W), until September 19, 1839

▌Richard H. Bayard (W), from January 12, 1841

▌2. Thomas Clayton (W)

==== Georgia ====
▌2. Wilson Lumpkin (D)
▌3. Alfred Cuthbert (D)

==== Illinois ====
▌2. John M. Robinson (D)
▌3. Richard M. Young (D)

==== Indiana ====
▌1. Albert S. White (W)
▌3. Oliver H. Smith (W)

==== Kentucky ====
▌2. John J. Crittenden (W)
▌3. Henry Clay (W)

==== Louisiana ====
▌2. Robert C. Nicholas (D)
▌3. Alexander Mouton (D)

==== Maine ====
▌1. Reuel Williams (D)
▌2. John Ruggles (D)

==== Maryland ====
▌1. William D. Merrick (W)
▌3. John S. Spence (W), until October 24, 1840

▌John L. Kerr (W), from January 5, 1841

==== Massachusetts ====
▌1. Daniel Webster (W), until February 22, 1841

▌Rufus Choate (W), from February 23, 1841

▌2. John Davis (W), until January 5, 1841

▌Isaac C. Bates (W), from January 13, 1841

==== Michigan ====
▌1. Augustus S. Porter (W), from January 20, 1840
▌2. John Norvell (D)

==== Mississippi ====
▌1. John Henderson (W)
▌2. Robert J. Walker (D)

==== Missouri ====
▌1. Thomas H. Benton (D)
▌3. Lewis F. Linn (D)

==== New Hampshire ====
▌2. Henry Hubbard (D)
▌3. Franklin Pierce (D)

==== New Jersey ====
▌1. Samuel L. Southard (W)
▌2. Garret D. Wall (D)

==== New York ====
▌1. Nathaniel P. Tallmadge (W), from January 14, 1840
▌3. Silas Wright Jr. (D)

==== North Carolina ====
▌2. Bedford Brown (D), until November 16, 1840

▌Willie P. Mangum (W), from November 25, 1840

▌3. Robert Strange (D), until November 16, 1840

▌William A. Graham (W), from November 25, 1840

==== Ohio ====
▌1. Benjamin Tappan (D)
▌3. William Allen (D)

==== Pennsylvania ====
▌1. Daniel Sturgeon (D), from January 14, 1840
▌3. James Buchanan (D)

==== Rhode Island ====
▌1. Nathan F. Dixon (W)
▌2. Nehemiah R. Knight (W)

==== South Carolina ====
▌2. John C. Calhoun (D)
▌3. William C. Preston (W)

==== Tennessee ====
▌1. Felix Grundy (D), November 19, 1839 – December 19, 1840

▌Alfred O. P. Nicholson (D), from December 25, 1840

▌2. Hugh Lawson White (W), until January 13, 1840

▌Alexander O. Anderson (D), from February 26, 1840

==== Vermont ====
▌1. Samuel S. Phelps (W)
▌3. Samuel Prentiss (W)

==== Virginia ====
▌1. William C. Rives (W), from January 18, 1841
▌2. William H. Roane (D)

Senators' party membership by state at the opening of the 26th Congress in March 1839. 2 Democrats 1 Democrat and 1 Whig 2 Whigs

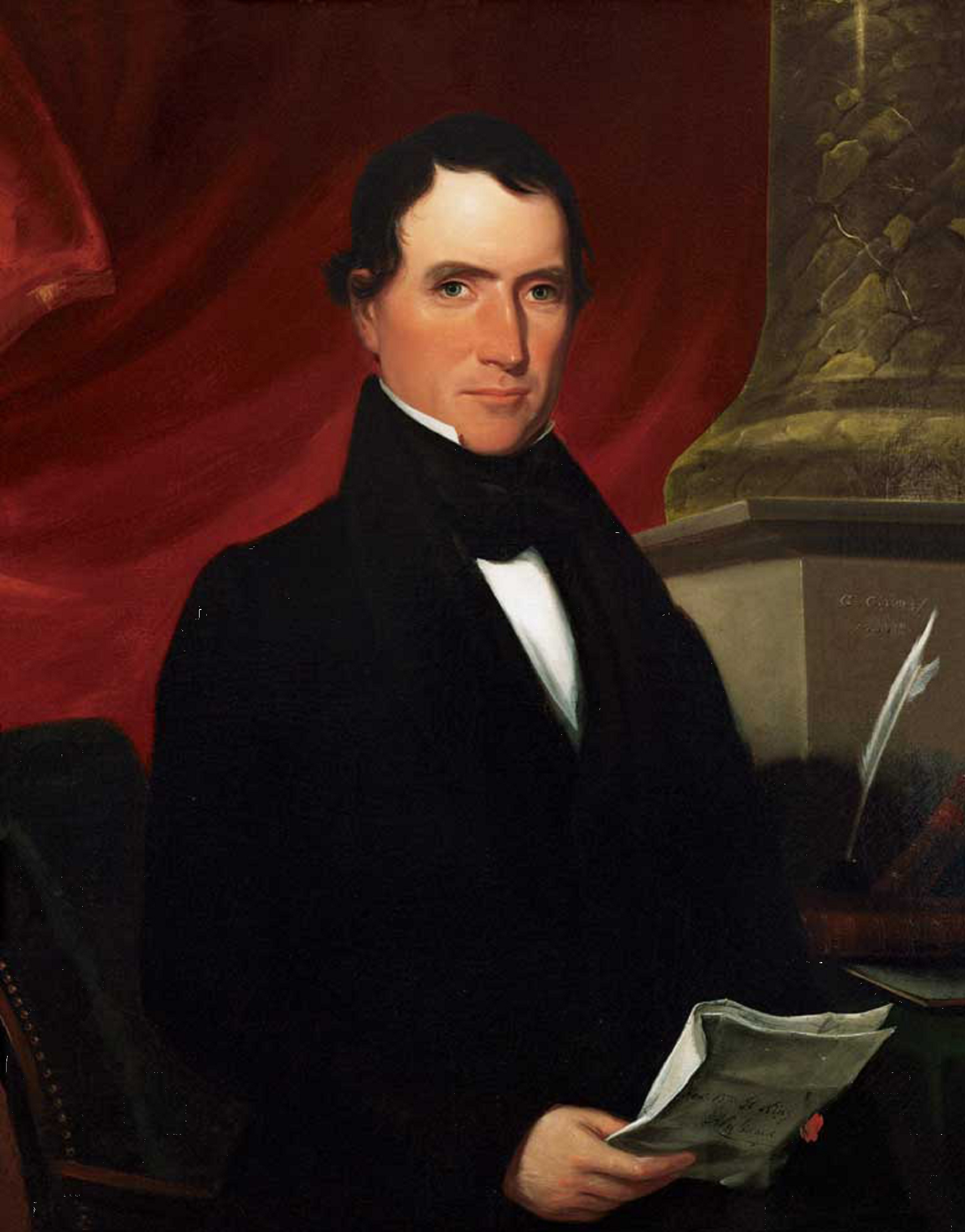
President pro tempore William R. King

=== House of Representatives ===
The names of representatives are preceded by their district numbers.

==== Alabama ====
▌1. Reuben Chapman (D)
▌2. David Hubbard (D)
▌3. George W. Crabb (W)
▌4. Dixon H. Lewis (D)
▌5. James Dellet (W)

==== Arkansas ====
▌At-large. Edward Cross (D)

==== Connecticut ====
▌1. Joseph Trumbull (W)
▌2. William L. Storrs (W), until June ???, 1840

▌William W. Boardman (W), from December 7, 1840

▌3. Thomas W. Williams (W)
▌4. Thomas B. Osborne (W)
▌5. Truman Smith (W)
▌6. John H. Brockway (W)

==== Delaware ====
▌At-large. Thomas Robinson Jr. (D)

==== Georgia ====
All representatives were elected statewide on a general ticket.

▌At-large. Julius C. Alford (W)
▌At-large. Edward J. Black (W)
▌At-large. Walter T. Colquitt (W), until July 21, 1840

▌Hines Holt (W), from February 1, 1841

▌At-large. Mark A. Cooper (W)
▌At-large. William C. Dawson (W)
▌At-large. Richard W. Habersham (W)
▌At-large. Thomas Butler King (W)
▌At-large. Eugenius A. Nisbet (W)
▌At-large. Lott Warren (W)

==== Illinois ====
▌1. John Reynolds (D)
▌2. Zadok Casey (D)
▌3. John T. Stuart (W)

==== Indiana ====
▌1. George H. Proffit (W)
▌2. John W. Davis (D)
▌3. John Carr (D)
▌4. Thomas Smith (D)
▌5. James Rariden (W)
▌6. William W. Wick (D)
▌7. Tilghman A. Howard (D), until July 1, 1840

▌Henry S. Lane (W), from August 3, 1840

==== Kentucky ====
▌1. Linn Boyd (D)
▌2. Philip Triplett (W)
▌3. Joseph R. Underwood (W)
▌4. Sherrod Williams (W)
▌5. Simeon H. Anderson (W), until August 11, 1840

▌John B. Thompson (W), from December 7, 1840

▌6. Willis Green (W)
▌7. John Pope (W)
▌8. William J. Graves (W)
▌9. John White (W)
▌10. Richard Hawes (W)
▌11. Landaff W. Andrews (W)
▌12. Garrett Davis (W)
▌13. William O. Butler (D)

==== Louisiana ====
▌1. Edward D. White (W)
▌2. Thomas W. Chinn (W)
▌3. Rice Garland (W), until July 21, 1840

▌John Moore (W), from December 17, 1840

==== Maine ====
▌1. Nathan Clifford (D)
▌2. Albert Smith (D)
▌3. Benjamin Randall (W)
▌4. George Evans (W), until March 3, 1841
▌5. Virgil D. Parris (D)
▌6. Hugh J. Anderson (D)
▌7. Joshua A. Lowell (D)
▌8. Thomas Davee (D)

==== Maryland ====
The 4th district was a plural district with two representatives.

▌1. John Dennis (W)
▌2. Philip F. Thomas (D)
▌3. John T. H. Worthington (D)
▌4. James Carroll (D)
▌4. Solomon Hillen Jr. (D)
▌5. William Cost Johnson (W)
▌6. Francis Thomas (D)
▌7. Daniel Jenifer (W)

==== Massachusetts ====
▌1. Abbott Lawrence (W), until September 18, 1840

▌Robert C. Winthrop (W), from November 9, 1840

▌2. Leverett Saltonstall I (W)
▌3. Caleb Cushing (W)
▌4. William Parmenter (D)
▌5. Levi Lincoln Jr. (W)
▌6. James C. Alvord (W), until September 27, 1839

▌Osmyn Baker (W), from January 14, 1840

▌7. George N. Briggs (W)
▌8. William B. Calhoun (W)
▌9. William S. Hastings (W)
▌10. Henry Williams (D)
▌11. John Reed Jr. (W)
▌12. John Quincy Adams (W)

==== Michigan ====
▌At-large. Isaac E. Crary (D)

==== Mississippi ====
Both representatives were elected statewide on a general ticket.

▌At-large. Albert G. Brown (D)
▌At-large. Jacob Thompson (D)

==== Missouri ====
Both representatives were elected statewide on a general ticket.

▌At-large. Albert G. Harrison (D), until September 7, 1839

▌John Jameson (D), from December 12, 1839

▌At-large. John Miller (D)

==== New Hampshire ====
All representatives were elected statewide on a general ticket.

▌At-large. Charles G. Atherton (D)
▌At-large. Edmund Burke (D)
▌At-large. Ira A. Eastman (D)
▌At-large. Tristram Shaw (D)
▌At-large. Jared W. Williams (D)

==== New Jersey ====
All representatives were elected statewide on a general ticket.

▌At-large. William R. Cooper (D)
▌At-large. Philemon Dickerson (D)
▌At-large. Joseph Kille (D)
▌At-large. Joseph F. Randolph (W)
▌At-large. Daniel B. Ryall (D)
▌At-large. Peter D. Vroom (D)

==== New York ====
There were four plural districts, the 8th, 17th, 22nd & 23rd had two representatives each, the 3rd had four representatives.

▌1. Thomas B. Jackson (D)
▌2. James De la Montanya (D)
▌3. Edward Curtis (W)
▌3. Moses H. Grinnell (W)
▌3. Ogden Hoffman (W)
▌3. James Monroe (W)
▌4. Gouverneur Kemble (D)
▌5. Charles Johnston (W)
▌6. Nathaniel Jones (D)
▌7. Rufus Palen (W)
▌8. John Ely (D)
▌8. Aaron Vanderpoel (D)
▌9. Hiram P. Hunt (W)
▌10. Daniel D. Barnard (W)
▌11. Anson Brown (W), until June 14, 1840

▌Nicholas B. Doe (W), from December 7, 1840

▌12. David A. Russell (W)
▌13. Augustus C. Hand (D)
▌14. John Fine (D)
▌15. Peter J. Wagner (W)
▌16. Andrew W. Doig (D)
▌17. David P. Brewster (D)
▌17. John G. Floyd (D)
▌18. Thomas C. Chittenden (W)
▌19. John H. Prentiss (D)
▌20. Judson Allen (D)
▌21. John C. Clark (W)
▌22. Amasa Dana (D)
▌22. Stephen B. Leonard (D)
▌23. Nehemiah H. Earll (D)
▌23. Edward Rogers (D)
▌24. Christopher Morgan (W)
▌25. Theron R. Strong (D)
▌26. Francis Granger (W)
▌27. Meredith Mallory (D)
▌28. Thomas Kempshall (W)
▌29. Seth M. Gates (W)
▌30. Luther C. Peck (W)
▌31. Richard P. Marvin (W)
▌32. Millard Fillmore (W)
▌33. Charles F. Mitchell (W)

==== North Carolina ====
▌1. Kenneth Rayner (W)
▌2. Jesse A. Bynum (D)
▌3. Edward Stanly (W)
▌4. Charles B. Shepard (D)
▌5. James I. McKay (D)
▌6. Micajah T. Hawkins (D)
▌7. Edmund Deberry (W)
▌8. William Montgomery (D)
▌9. John Hill (D)
▌10. Charles Fisher (D)
▌11. Henry W. Connor (D)
▌12. James Graham (W)
▌13. Lewis Williams (W)

==== Ohio ====
▌1. Alexander Duncan (D)
▌2. John B. Weller (D)
▌3. Patrick G. Goode (W)
▌4. Thomas Corwin (W), until May 30, 1840

▌Jeremiah Morrow (W), from October 13, 1840

▌5. William Doan (D)
▌6. Calvary Morris (W)
▌7. William K. Bond (W)
▌8. Joseph Ridgway (W)
▌9. William Medill (D)
▌10. Samson Mason (W)
▌11. Isaac Parrish (D)
▌12. Jonathan Taylor (D)
▌13. Daniel P. Leadbetter (D)
▌14. George Sweeny (D)
▌15. John W. Allen (W)
▌16. Joshua R. Giddings (W)
▌17. John Hastings (D)
▌18. David A. Starkweather (D)
▌19. Henry Swearingen (D)

==== Pennsylvania ====
There were two plural districts, the 2nd had two representatives, the 4th had three representatives.

▌1. Lemuel Paynter (D)
▌2. John Sergeant (W)
▌2. George W. Toland (W)
▌3. Charles Naylor (W)
▌4. Edward Davies (AM)
▌4. John Edwards (AM)
▌4. Francis James (AM)
▌5. Joseph Fornance (D)
▌6. John Davis (D)
▌7. David D. Wagener (D)
▌8. Peter Newhard (D)
▌9. George M. Keim (D)
▌10. William Simonton (W)
▌11. James Gerry (D)
▌12. James Cooper (W)
▌13. William S. Ramsey (D), until October 17, 1840

▌Charles McClure (D), from December 7, 1840

▌14. William W. Potter (D), until October 28, 1839

▌George McCulloch (D), from November 20, 1839

▌15. David Petrikin (D)
▌16. Robert H. Hammond (D)
▌17. Samuel W. Morris (D)
▌18. Charles Ogle (AM)
▌19. Albert G. Marchand (D)
▌20. Enos Hook (D)
▌21. Isaac Leet (D)
▌22. Richard Biddle (AM), until July 21, 1840

▌Henry M. Brackenridge (W), from October 13, 1840

▌23. William Beatty (D)
▌24. Thomas Henry (AM)
▌25. John Galbraith (D)

==== Rhode Island ====
▌At-large. Robert B. Cranston (W)
▌At-large. Joseph L. Tillinghast (W)

==== South Carolina ====
▌1. Isaac E. Holmes (D)
▌2. Robert Rhett (D)
▌3. John Campbell (D)
▌4. Sampson H. Butler (D)
▌5. Francis W. Pickens (D)
▌6. Waddy Thompson Jr. (W)
▌7. James Rogers (D)
▌8. Thomas D. Sumter (D)
▌9. John K. Griffin (D)

==== Tennessee ====
▌1. William B. Carter (W)
▌2. Abraham McClellan (D)
▌3. Joseph L. Williams (W)
▌4. Julius W. Blackwell (D)
▌5. Hopkins L. Turney (D)
▌6. William B. Campbell (W)
▌7. John Bell (W)
▌8. Meredith P. Gentry (W)
▌9. Harvey M. Watterson (D)
▌10. Aaron V. Brown (D)
▌11. Cave Johnson (D)
▌12. John W. Crockett (W)
▌13. Christopher H. Williams (W)

==== Vermont ====
▌1. Hiland Hall (W)
▌2. William Slade (W)
▌3. Horace Everett (W)
▌4. John Smith (D)
▌5. Isaac Fletcher (D)

==== Virginia ====
▌1. Joel Holleman (D), until December 1840

▌Francis Mallory (W), from December 28, 1840

▌2. Francis E. Rives (D)
▌3. John W. Jones (D)
▌4. George C. Dromgoole (D)
▌5. John Hill (W)
▌6. Walter Coles (D)
▌7. William L. Goggin (W)
▌8. Henry A. Wise (W)
▌9. Robert M. T. Hunter (W)
▌10. John Taliaferro (W)
▌11. John M. Botts (W)
▌12. James Garland (C)
▌13. Linn Banks (D)
▌14. Charles F. Mercer (W), until December 26, 1839

▌William M. McCarty (W), from January 25, 1840

▌15. William Lucas (D)
▌16. Green B. Samuels (D)
▌17. Robert Craig (D)
▌18. George W. Hopkins (C)
▌19. Andrew Beirne (D)
▌20. Joseph Johnson (D)
▌21. Lewis Steenrod (D)

==== Non-voting members ====
Florida Territory. Charles Downing
▌Iowa Territory. William W. Chapman (D), until October 27, 1840

▌Augustus C. Dodge (D), from October 28, 1840

▌Wisconsin Territory. James D. Doty (D)

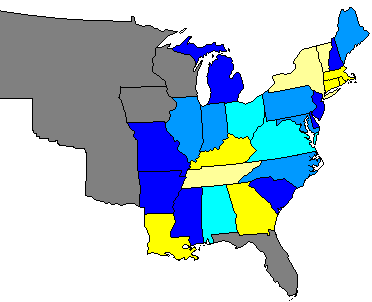
House seats by party holding plurality in state: 80+% Democratic / 80+% Whig; 60+% to 80% Democratic / 60+% to 80% Whig; Up to 60% Democratic / Up to 60% Whig

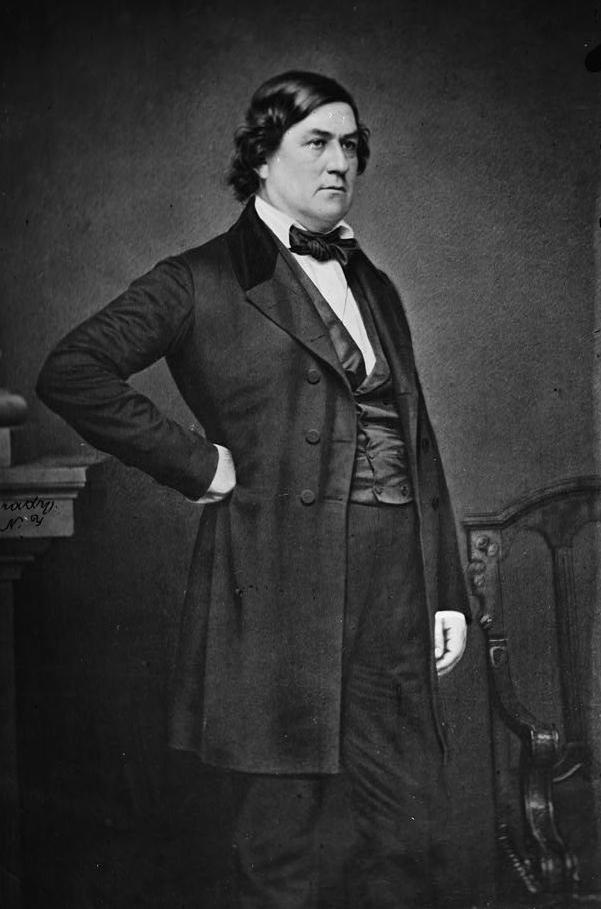
Speaker of the House Robert M. T. Hunter

== Changes in membership ==
The count below reflects changes from the beginning of the first session of this Congress.

=== Senate ===
- Replacements: 8
  - Democrats: 0-seat net loss
  - Whigs: 0-seat net gain
- Deaths: 3
- Resignations: 7
- Interim appointments: 0
- Total seats with changes: 11

Senate changes
| State (class) | Vacated by | Reason for change | Successor | Date of successor's formal installation (Note: When seated or oath administered, not necessarily when service began.) |
|---|---|---|---|---|
| Tennessee (1) | Vacant after previous Congress | | Felix Grundy (D) | Elected November 19, 1839 |
| New York (1) | Vacant after previous Congress | | Nathaniel P. Tallmadge (W) | Elected January 14, 1840 |
| Pennsylvania (1) | Vacant after previous Congress | | Daniel Sturgeon (D) | Elected January 14, 1840 |
| Michigan (1) | Vacant after legislature failed to reelect incumbent. | | Augustus S. Porter (W) | Elected January 20, 1840 |
| Virginia (1) | Vacant after legislature failed to reelect incumbent. | | William C. Rives (W) | Elected January 18, 1841 |
| Delaware (1) | Richard H. Bayard (W) | Resigned September 19, 1839, to become Chief Justice of the Delaware Supreme Court | Richard H. Bayard (W) | Elected January 12, 1841, to his former position |
| Tennessee (2) | Hugh Lawson White (W) | Resigned January 13, 1840, because he could not conscientiously obey the intentions of his constituents | Alexander O. Anderson (D) | Elected February 26, 1840 |
| Connecticut (1) | Thaddeus Betts (W) | Died April 7, 1840 | Jabez W. Huntington (W) | Elected May 4, 1840 |
| Maryland (3) | John S. Spence (W) | Died October 24, 1840 | John L. Kerr (W) | Elected January 5, 1841 |
| North Carolina (2) | Bedford Brown (D) | Resigned November 16, 1840, because he could not obey instructions of the North Carolina General Assembly | Willie P. Mangum (W) | Elected November 25, 1840 |
| North Carolina (3) | Robert Strange (D) | Resigned November 16, 1840 | William A. Graham (W) | Elected November 25, 1840 |
| Tennessee (1) | Felix Grundy (D) | Died December 19, 1840 | Alfred O. P. Nicholson (D) | Elected December 25, 1840 |
| Massachusetts (2) | John Davis (W) | Resigned January 5, 1841, after being elected Governor of Massachusetts | Isaac C. Bates (W) | Elected January 13, 1841 |
| Massachusetts (1) | Daniel Webster (W) | Resigned February 22, 1841 | Rufus Choate (W) | Elected February 23, 1841 |

=== House of Representatives ===
- Replacements: 15
  - Democrats: 2-seat net loss
  - Whigs: 3-seat net gain
  - Anti-Masonic: 1-seat net loss
- Deaths: 6
- Resignations: 10
- Contested election: 0
- Total seats with changes: 17

House changes
| District | Vacated by | Reason for change | Successor | Date of successor's formal installation |
|---|---|---|---|---|
| Indiana 7th | Vacant | Rep-elect Howard presented credentials August 5, 1839 | Tilghman Howard (D) | Seated August 5, 1839 |
| Missouri at-large | Albert G. Harrison (D) | Died September 7, 1839 | John Jameson (D) | Seated December 12, 1839 |
| Massachusetts 6th | James C. Alvord (W) | Died September 27, 1839 | Osmyn Baker (W) | Seated January 14, 1840 |
| Pennsylvania 14th | William W. Potter (D) | Died October 28, 1839 | George McCulloch (D) | Seated November 20, 1839 |
| Virginia 14th | Charles F. Mercer (W) | Resigned December 26, 1839 | William M. McCarty (W) | Seated January 25, 1840 |
| Ohio 4th | Thomas Corwin (W) | Resigned May 30, 1840, having become a candidate for Governor of Ohio | Jeremiah Morrow (W) | Seated October 13, 1840 |
| Connecticut 2nd | William L. Storrs (W) | Resigned some time in June, 1840 | William W. Boardman (W) | Seated December 7, 1840 |
| New York 11th | Anson Brown (W) | Died June 14, 1840 | Nicholas B. Doe (W) | Seated December 7, 1840 |
| Indiana 7th | Tilghman Howard (D) | Resigned July 1, 1840 | HHenry S. Lane (W) | Seated August 3, 1840 |
| Georgia at-large | Walter T. Colquitt (W) | Resigned July 21, 1840 | Hines Holt (W) | Seated February 1, 1841 |
| Louisiana 3rd | Rice Garland (W) | Resigned July 21, 1840, to accept appointment as judge of Louisiana Supreme Court | John Moore (W) | Seated December 17, 1840 |
| Pennsylvania 22nd | Richard Biddle (AM) | Resigned July 21, 1840 | Henry M. Brackenridge (W) | Seated October 13, 1840 |
| Kentucky 5th | Simeon H. Anderson (W) | Died August 11, 1840 | John B. Thompson (W) | Seated December 7, 1840 |
| Massachusetts 1st | Abbott Lawrence (W) | Resigned September 18, 1840 | Robert C. Winthrop (W) | Seated November 9, 1840 |
| Pennsylvania 13th | William S. Ramsey (D) | Died October 17, 1840 | Charles McClure (D) | Seated December 7, 1840 |
| Iowa Territory at-large | William W. Chapman (D) | Term expired by law October 27, 1840 | Augustus C. Dodge (D) | Seated October 28, 1840 |
| Virginia 1st | Joel Holleman (D) | Resigned in December 1840 | Francis Mallory (W) | Seated December 28, 1840 |
| Maine 4th | George Evans (W) | Resigned March 3, 1841, after being elected to the US Senate | Vacant | Not filled this term |

== Committees ==
Lists of committees and their party leaders.

=== Senate ===
- Agriculture (Chairman: Alexander Mouton)
- Audit and Control the Contingent Expenses of the Senate (Chairman: Nehemiah R. Knight)
- Claims (Chairman: Henry Hubbard)
- Commerce (Chairman: William R. King)
- Distributing Public Revenue Among the States (Select)
- District of Columbia (Chairman: Richard H. Bayard)&
- Engrossed Bills (Chairman: Oliver Smith then John Henderson)
- Finance (Chairman: Silas Wright)
- Fiscal Corporation of the United States (Select)
- Foreign Relations (Chairman: James Buchanan)
- Indian Affairs (Chairman: Ambrose H. Sevier)
- Judiciary (Chairman: Garret D. Wall)
- Manufactures (Chairman: Wilson Lumpkin)
- Military Affairs (Chairman: Thomas Hart Benton)
- Militia (Chairman: Clement C. Clay)
- Naval Affairs (Chairman: Reuel Williams)
- Patents and the Patent Office (Chairman: Daniel Sturgeon)
- Pensions (Chairman: Franklin Pierce)
- Post Office and Post Roads (Chairman: John M. Robinson)
- Printing (Chairman: N/A)
- Private Land Claims (Chairman: Lewis F. Linn)
- Public Buildings and Grounds (Chairman: William S. Fulton)
- Public Lands (Chairman: Robert J. Walker)
- Revolutionary Claims (Chairman: Perry Smith)
- Roads and Canals (Chairman: Richard M. Young)
- Tariff Regulation (Select)
- Whole

=== House of Representatives ===
- Accounts (Chairman: Joseph Johnson)
- Agriculture (Chairman: Edmund Deberry)
- Apportionment of Representatives (Select)
- Claims (Chairman: David A. Russell)
- Commerce (Chairman: Edward Curtis)
- District of Columbia (Chairman: William C. Johnson)
- Elections (Chairman: Francis E. Rives)
- Expenditures in the Navy Department (Chairman: Leverett Saltonstall I)
- Expenditures in the Post Office Department (Chairman: Richard P. Marvin)
- Expenditures in the State Department (Chairman: Joseph R. Underwood)
- Expenditures in the Treasury Department (Chairman: George Evans)
- Expenditures in the War Department (Chairman: Peter J. Wagner)
- Expenditures on Public Buildings (Chairman: Edward Stanly)
- Foreign Affairs (Chairman: Francis W. Pickens)
- Indian Affairs (Chairman: John Bell)
- Invalid Pensions (Chairman: Sherrod Williams)
- Judiciary (Chairman: John Sergeant)
- Manufactures (Chairman: John Quincy Adams)
- Memorial of the Agricultural Bank of Mississippi (Select)
- Mileage (Chairman: Thomas W. Williams)
- Military Affairs (Chairman: Cave Johnson until 1840, then Waddy Thompson Jr.)
- Militia (Chairman: George M. Keim)
- Naval Affairs (Chairman: Francis Thomas)
- Patents (Chairman: Issac Fletcher)
- Post Office and Post Roads (Chairman: James I. McKay)
- Private Land Claims (Chairman: William B. Calhoun)
- Public Buildings and Grounds (Chairman: Stephen B. Leonard)
- Public Expenditures (Chairman: William K. Bond)
- Public Lands (Chairman: Thomas Corwin 1839-1840, then Samson Mason 1840, then Jeremiah Morrow)
- Revisal and Unfinished Business (Chairman: Luther C. Peck)
- Revolutionary Claims (Chairman: Joseph F. Randolph)
- Revolutionary Pensions (Chairman: John Taliaferro)
- Roads and Canals (Chairman: Charles Ogle)
- Rules (Select)
- Standards of Official Conduct
- Territories (Chairman: John Pope)
- Ways and Means (Chairman: John W. Jones)
- Whole

=== Joint committees ===
- Enrolled Bills (Chairman: Sen. Benjamin Tappan)
- The Library (Chairman: N/A)

== Employees ==
- Librarian of Congress: John Silva Meehan

=== Senate ===
- Chaplain: Henry Slicer (Methodist), until December 31, 1839
  - George G. Cookman (Methodist), from December 31, 1839
- Secretary: Asbury Dickins
- Sergeant at Arms: Stephen Haight

=== House of Representatives ===
- Chaplain: Levi M. Reese (Methodist), until February 4, 1840
  - Joshua Bates (Congregationalist), elected February 4, 1840
  - Thomas W. Braxton (Baptist), elected December 7, 1840
- Clerk: Hugh A. Garland
- Doorkeeper: Joseph Follansbee, elected December 23, 1839
- Postmaster: William J. McCormick, elected December 23, 1839
- Sergeant at Arms: Roderick Dorsey

== See also ==
- 1838 United States elections (elections leading to this Congress)
  - 1838–39 United States Senate elections
  - 1838–39 United States House of Representatives elections
- 1840 United States elections (elections during this Congress, leading to the next Congress)
  - 1840 United States presidential election
  - 1840–41 United States Senate elections
  - 1840–41 United States House of Representatives elections
