= Archibald L. Linn =

American politician (1802–1857)

Member of the New York State Assembly
- In office January 1, 1844 – December 31, 1844
- Preceded by: Edward H. Walton
- Succeeded by: William Gifford

Member of the U.S. House of Representatives
- In office March 4, 1841 – March 3, 1843
- Preceded by: Nicholas B. Doe
- Succeeded by: Zadock Pratt

Personal details
- Born: Archibald Ladley Linn; October 15, 1802 New York City, New York
- Died: October 10, 1857 (aged 54) Schenectady, New York
- Resting place: Albany Rural Cemetery
- Party: Whig
- Spouse: Mary Ten Eyck McClelland (m. 1825)
- Parent(s): Rev. William Adolphus Linn; Helena Low Hansen
- Education: Union College (1820)

Archibald Ladley Linn (October 15, 1802 – October 10, 1857) was a U.S. representative from New York.

== Early life ==
Linn was born in New York City on October 15, 1802. He was the son of Rev. William Adolphus Linn (1752–1808) and Helena (née Low) Hansen (1760–1837). His mother was first married to Dirck Hansen (1743–1799), a Captain in the Revolutionary War with whom she had at least seven children before his death. His parents married in 1800 and his father, William was the 1st Chaplain of the United States House of Representatives and the 2nd President of Queen's College (now Rutgers University), in 1800.

His mother was the granddaughter of Cornelis Cuyler, the 20th Mayor of Albany and son of Johannes Cuyler, and Catharina Schuyler, herself the daughter of Johannes Schuyler and the niece of Pieter and Arent Schuyler, all of the prominent Schuyler family. His great-grandmother was also the sister of Johannes Schuyler Jr. and the aunt of Gen. Philip Schuyler.

== Career ==
Linn was a member of the class of 1820 at Union College, Schenectady, New York. He studied law, was admitted to the bar and commenced practice in Schenectady. He served as county judge of Schenectady County from January 17, 1840, to February 9, 1845.

Linn was elected as a Whig to the Twenty-seventh Congress, serving from March 4, 1841 to March 3, 1843. He served as chairman of the Committee on Public Expenditures (Twenty-seventh Congress).

Following his service in the United States House of Representatives, he served for year as a member of the New York State Assembly from January 1 to December 31, 1844.

== Personal life ==
Linn was married to Mary Ten Eyck McClelland (1808–1896). Mary was the daughter of William McClelland (1768–1812) and Ann Ten Eyck McClelland (1774–1813). Her mother was the widow of Barent Ten Eyck (1766–1796) of the prominent Ten Eyck family, before she married her father, William. Together, they were the parents of:

- William Linn (1826–1844)
- Peter Van R. Linn (1828–1901)
- John Blair Linn (1830–1901), a Reverend who married Mary Morgan (1835–1892).
- Charles F. Linn (1833–1841), who died young.
- Mary H. Linn (1835–1925), who married James Hastings (1835–1914) in 1871.
- Archibald Linn (1839–1864)
- Charles Franchot Linn (1841–1923), who married Rachel Fuller Linn (1848–1928).
- Helen Lowe Linn (1843–1923)
- Jeannette Linn (1845–1861)

He died in Schenectady, New York, October 10, 1857. He was interred at the Albany Rural Cemetery in Menands, New York.

== Sources ==
U.S. House of Representatives
Preceded by Nicholas B. Doe	Member of the U.S. House of Representatives from New York's 11th congressional district 1841–1843	Succeeded by Zadock Pratt
New York State Assembly
Preceded by Edward H. Walton	New York State Assembly; Schenectady County; 1844	Succeeded by William Gifford
