= Nicholas B. Doe =

American politician

Member of the U.S. House of Representatives from New York's 11th district
- In office December 7, 1840 – March 3, 1841
- Preceded by: Anson Brown
- Succeeded by: Archibald L. Linn

New York State Assembly (Saratoga Co.)
- In office 1825

Personal details
- Born: June 16, 1786 New York City, New York
- Died: December 6, 1856 (aged 70) Saratoga Springs, New York
- Resting place: Greenridge Cemetery
- Party: Whig

Nicholas Bartlett Doe (June 16, 1786 – December 6, 1856) was a U.S. representative from New York.

== Biography ==
Born in New York City, Doe graduated from Phillips Exeter Academy, in Exeter, New Hampshire. He studied law, was admitted to the bar, and settled in Saratoga County, New York to work as a lawyer. He was a member of the New York State Assembly (Saratoga Co.) in 1825.

Doe was elected as a Whig to the Twenty-sixth Congress to fill the vacancy caused by the death of Anson Brown. He took his seat on December 7, 1840, and served until March 3, 1841. After his term as representative, he resumed practicing law, and became trustee of the village of Waterford, Saratoga County, in 1841.

Doe died at Saratoga Springs, New York, December 6, 1856. He was interred in Greenridge Cemetery.

U.S. House of Representatives
Preceded by Anson Brown	Member of the U.S. House of Representatives from New York's 11th congressional district 1840-06-14 – 1841	Succeeded by Archibald L. Linn
