= Ballston Spa National Bank =

American bank

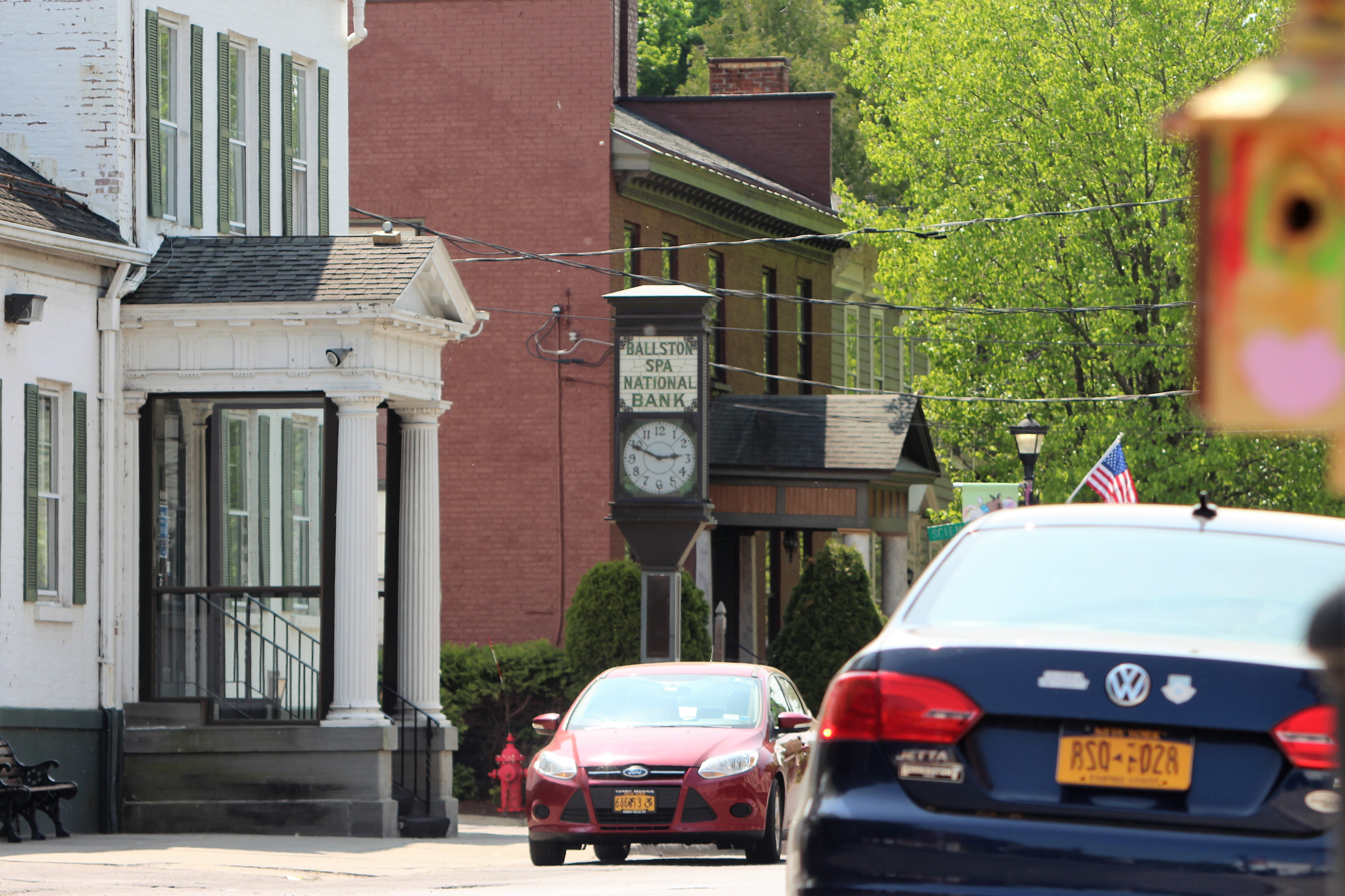
- Ballston Spa National Bank's original location (left) at 87 Front Street in Ballston Spa.
- Native name: BSNB
- Industry: Bank
- Founded: 1838; 188 years ago
- Headquarters: 990 State Route 67, Ballston Spa, New York, United States
- Key people: Christopher R. Dowd (CEO)
- Website: www.bsnb.com

Ballston Spa National Bank is one of the oldest American banks founded in 1838 and located in Ballston Spa, Saratoga County, New York.

The bank services include:

- checking accounts
- savings and money market accounts
- health savings accounts
- certificates of deposit (CDs), etc.

In August 2015 was opened its 11th branch, the first office in Albany County located in Latham and is focused on business clients.
