= Luther C. Peck =

American politician (1800–1876)

Member of the U.S. House of Representatives from New York's 30th district
- In office March 4, 1837 – March 3, 1841
- Preceded by: John Young
- Succeeded by: John Young

Personal details
- Born: Luther Christopher Peck; January 1800 Farmington, Connecticut, U.S.
- Died: February 5, 1876 (aged 76) Nunda, New York, U.S.
- Resting place: Oakwood Cemetery, Nunda, New York, U.S.
- Party: Whig
- Other political affiliations: Republican
- Profession: Politician, lawyer

Luther Christopher Peck (January 1800 – February 5, 1876) was a U.S. representative from New York.

Born in Farmington, Connecticut in January 1800, Peck completed preparatory studies and taught school in Holley, New York. He studied law, was admitted to the bar and practiced.

He moved to Allegheny County, Pennsylvania, and later to Pike, New York, and continued the practice of law. He held various local offices.

Peck was elected as a Whig to the Twenty-fifth and Twenty-sixth Congresses (March 4, 1837 – March 3, 1841). He served as chairman of the Committee on Revisal and Unfinished Business (Twenty-sixth Congress).

He resumed the practice of his profession in Pike. He was affiliated with the Republican Party after it was formed.

He moved to Nunda, New York, and continued the practice of law. He died in Nunda on February 5, 1876, and was interred in Oakwood Cemetery.

== Sources ==
- United States Congress. "Luther C. Peck (id: P000179)". Biographical Directory of the United States Congress.

U.S. House of Representatives
Preceded by John Young	Member of the U.S. House of Representatives from New York's 30th congressional district 1837–1841	Succeeded by John Young
