= Christ Church and Manlius Village Cemeteries =

Historic church in New York, United States

- U.S. National Register of Historic Places
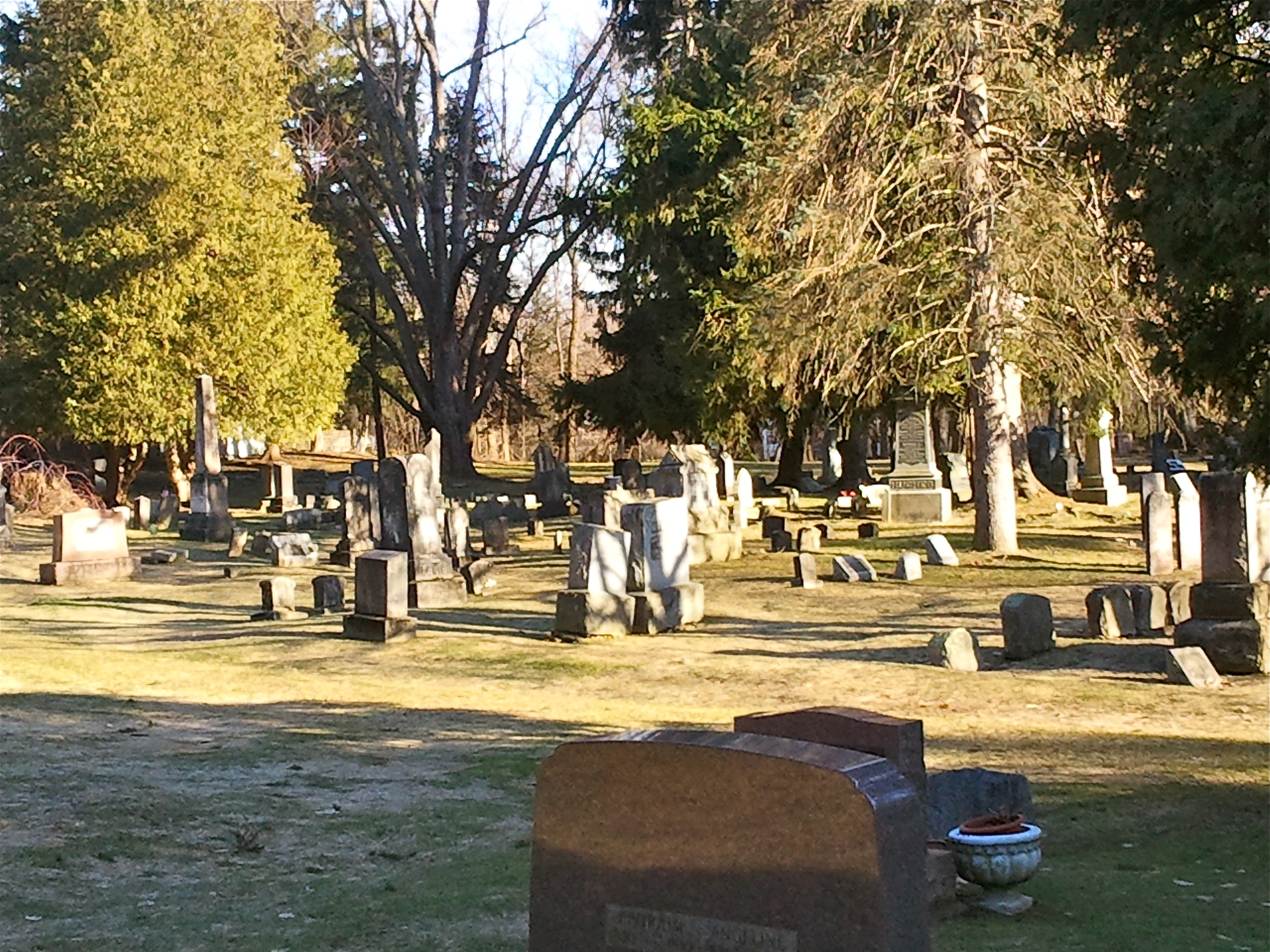

- Location within New York Location within the United States
- Location: East Seneca St., Manlius, New York
- Coordinates: 43°0′9″N 75°58′12″W
- Area: 7 acres (2.8 ha)
- Built: 1809
- NRHP reference No.: 06001298
- Added to NRHP: January 25, 2007

Christ Church and Manlius Village Cemeteries in Manlius, New York is a 7 acres (2.8 ha) designation on the National Register of Historic Places.

The listing includes two adjacent cemeteries and a stone wall.

60 rods of land were donated to Christ Church for a cemetery on March 4, 1813.
