= Francis Mallory =

American politician

Member of the U.S. House of Representatives from Virginia's 1st district
- In office December 28, 1840 – March 3, 1843
- Preceded by: Joel Holleman
- Succeeded by: Archibald Atkinson
- In office March 4, 1837 – March 3, 1839
- Preceded by: George Loyall
- Succeeded by: Joel Holleman

Member of the Virginia House of Delegates from Norfolk City
- In office 1854–1859
- Preceded by: Harrison Robertson
- Succeeded by: D. T. Bisbie

Personal details
- Born: December 12, 1807 Elizabeth City County, Virginia, US
- Died: March 26, 1860 (aged 52) Norfolk, Virginia, US
- Party: Whig
- Education: University of Pennsylvania
- Profession: physician, businessman

Military service
- Allegiance: United States of America
- Branch/service: United States Navy
- Years of service: 1822–1828

Francis Mallory (December 12, 1807 – March 26, 1860) was an American naval officer, medical doctor, and railroad executive, who as a Whig politician served two terms in the United States House of Representatives representing Virginia's 1st congressional district. He later served two terms in the Virginia House of Delegates representing Norfolk.

== Early life ==
Francis Mallory was born in 1807 in Elizabeth City County, Virginia, part of the Hampton Roads seaport and (now) metropolitan area, to the former Frances Lowry Stephenson (1786-1845), and her husband, Charles King Mallory (1781-1820), who briefly served as Lieutenant Governor of Virginia in 1812. His grandfather and namesake, Col. Francis Mallory (1740-1781) was a Virginia militia officer who married three times before his death in the Skirmish at Waters Creek while defending Hampton during the Patriot's Siege of Yorktown near the end of the American Revolutionary War.

Young Francis Mallory had a sister Mary (1810-1853) and two younger brothers, William Stevenson Mallory (1817-1857) and Charles King Mallory (1820-1875). He attended the private Hampton Academy and began a career as a naval officer after his father's death in Norfolk in 1820, accepting a midshipman's commission in the United States Navy and serving from 1822 to 1828.

Mallory graduated from the medical department of the University of Pennsylvania in Philadelphia in 1831. He may have had a first wife who died in 1830. He married Mary Francis Wright, and in 1850 the family lived at Old Point Comfort in Elizabeth City County with their sons Francis Jr. (1834-1863) and Charles O'Connor (Connor) Mallory (1842-1877) and daughters Abby, Mary, Kate and Alice. Two other sons died in infancy, and their parents would choose to be buried beside them. Mallory's namesake son would die at the Battle of Chancellorsville in 1863 and his fellow C.S.A. officer/cousin Charles King Mallory days later. Charles O'Connor Mallory (1842-1877) enlisted as a private in the 6th Virginia Infantry in April 1861, rose to the rank of Sergeant Major after being transferred to the 55th Virginia Infantry, surrendered at Appomattox Courthouse, became a farmer in Essex County, Virginia and had sons to carry on the family's military tradition.

== Tenure in the House of Representatives ==
Mallory established a medical practice in the area surrounding Norfolk, Virginia. He won election to the U.S. House of Representatives to represent Virginia's 1st congressional district in 1836, but lost to Democrat Joel Holleman two years later. During that re-election campaign, Holleman promised that he would resign if a Whig became President in 1840. William Henry Harrison did win the presidency and Mallory won the election to complete the rest of the term, as well as the following election, thereby serving as the area's Congressman until March 1843.

== Career after Congress ==
He also served as Navy Agent in Norfolk during the administration of President Millard Fillmore (a fellow Whig) in the early 1850s. His political career continued as a Delegate in the Virginia General Assembly, representing Norfolk city from 1854 to 1859.

For many years, Mallory lobbied the Virginia General Assembly on behalf of a railroad line to Norfolk, despite rival railroad and shipping interests from Richmond and Petersburg. In 1851, Dr. Mallory and the Norfolk interests finally succeeded in obtaining a legislative charter as well as financing from the Virginia Board of Public Works to form the Norfolk and Petersburg Railroad (N&P).

In 1853, the new railroad hired a 26-year-old civil engineer and Virginia Military Institute graduate from Southampton County named William Mahone. Small-statured "Little Billy" Mahone was frugal with expenses yet managed to build the N&P to high construction standards. He designed and implemented an innovative corduroy roadbed through the Great Dismal Swamp between South Norfolk and Suffolk. The design included a log foundation laid at right angles beneath the surface of the swamp, and rented enslaved labor built it. Still in use 150 years later, it withstands immense tonnages of export coal traffic en route to coal piers at Norfolk's Lambert's Point. Mahone was also responsible for engineering and building a 52 mile-long tangent track between Suffolk and Petersburg which remains a major artery of modern Norfolk Southern rail traffic (although rebuilt after the American Civil War).

== Personal life ==
Mallory survived the Yellow Fever epidemic which swept through Norfolk in 1855 and killed 2,000 of its 6,000 citizens. However, the many deaths as well as financial hardship delayed construction of his new railroad for more than a year. After the railroad was completed in 1858, he stepped down and Mahone became its new president.

== Death and legacy ==
Mallory died in Norfolk on March 26, 1860.

Francis Mallory Elementary School of the Hampton City Public Schools and Mallory Street in Hampton's historic Phoebus section near Fort Monroe are named in his honor.

== Electoral history ==
1837; Mallory was elected with 50.26% of the vote, defeating Democrat Joel Hollerman.

U.S. House of Representatives
Preceded by George Loyall	Member of the U.S. House of Representatives from Virginia's 1st congressional district 1837–1839	Succeeded by Joel Holleman
Preceded by Joel Holleman	Member of the U.S. House of Representatives from Virginia's 1st congressional district 1840–1843	Succeeded by Archibald Atkinson
