= Edward Rogers (American politician) =

American politician

Member of the U.S. House of Representatives from New York's 23rd district
- In office March 4, 1839 – March 3, 1841
- Preceded by: Seat created
- Succeeded by: A. Lawrence Foster

Personal details
- Born: May 30, 1787 Cornwall, Connecticut, U.S.
- Died: May 29, 1857 (aged 69) Galway, New York, U.S.
- Resting place: Madison Cemetery, Madison, New York
- Party: Democratic
- Children: Hezekiah Gold Rogers

Edward Rogers (May 30, 1787 – May 29, 1857) was an American lawyer and politician who served one term as a U.S. representative from New York from 1839 to 1841.

== Biography ==
Born in Cornwall, Connecticut, Rogers completed preparatory studies and graduated from Williams College in Williamstown, Massachusetts, in 1809. He moved to New York State around the close of the War of 1812 and obtained his degree from Yale College. Subsequently, he pursued studies in law, gaining admission to the bar and commencing practice in Madison, New York.

=== Political career ===
He served as delegate to the State convention to revise the constitution in 1822. He served as judge of the court of common pleas for Madison County.

==== Congress ====
Rogers was elected as a Democrat to the Twenty-sixth Congress (March 4, 1839 – March 3, 1841).

=== Later career and death ===
He resumed the practice of law. He also engaged in literary pursuits.

He died in Galway, New York on May 29, 1857, and was interred in Madison Cemetery.

=== Family ===
He was the father of Hezekiah Gold Rogers, the United States chargé d'affaires in Sardinia from 1840 to 1841.

== Sources ==
- United States Congress. "Edward Rogers (id: R000393)". Biographical Directory of the United States Congress.

U.S. House of Representatives
Preceded by seat created	Member of the U.S. House of Representatives from New York's 23rd congressional district March 4, 1839 – March 3, 1841	Succeeded by A. Lawrence Foster
