= Rice Garland =

American judge

Rice Garland (September 30, 1799 – August 13, 1863) was an American lawyer, jurist, politician and slaveholder who served as a United States representative from Louisiana from 1834 to 1840.

== Biography ==
Garland was born in Lynchburg, Virginia, and he pursued a basic education, studied law and was admitted to the bar and commenced the practice of law. He moved to Opelousas, Louisiana, in 1820 and continued the practice of his profession.

=== Congress ===
Garland was elected from the Louisiana's 3rd congressional district as an Anti-Jacksonian in 1833 to the Twenty-third Congress to fill the vacancy caused by the resignation of Henry Adams Bullard. He was reelected as an Anti-Jacksonian to the Twenty-fourth Congress and as a Whig to the Twenty-fifth and Twenty-sixth Congresses, in which he served as chairman of the Committee on Expenditures in the Department of War.

=== Later career and death ===
Garland served in Congress from April 28, 1834, to July 21, 1840, when he resigned to accept an appointment as judge of the Supreme Court of Louisiana. He served in that capacity, with residence in New Orleans, until 1846. In 1846, he moved to Brownsville, Texas, and continued the practice of law until his death.

He died in Brownsville in 1863.

U.S. House of Representatives
Preceded by Henry Adams Bullard	Member of the U.S. House of Representatives from Louisiana's 3rd congressional district 1834 – 1840	Succeeded by John Moore
