= Mottville, New York =

Mottville
- hamlet
- Location within the state of New York
- Coordinates: 42°58′25″N 76°26′33″W
- Country: United States
- State: New York
- County: Onondaga
- Time zone: UTC-5 (Eastern (EST))
  - Summer (DST): UTC-4 (EDT)
- ZIP codes: 13119, 13152
- Area code: 315

Mottville is a hamlet in the Town of Skaneateles, New York, United States. A tornado touched down in Mottville on July 28, 2002.

== History ==
Mottville, originally styled "Mottsville", was named after Arthur Mott, who moved to the area about 1820, owned a wool factory, and was for some time a successful and prominent citizen. He died of the effects of alcoholism in Toledo, Ohio, on October 30, 1869. The Friends Female Boarding School was established on the west shore of Skaneateles Lake by Lydia P. Mott, mother of Arthur Mott, soon after her arrival in about 1818.

In 1836 Mottville contained about 30 homes, a post-office, one furnace, a grist and saw mill, and a tavern. Skaneateles Falls also developed into a busy center with a post-office. Other hamlets in the vicinity were Kellogg's Mills, Willow Glen, and Glenside.

A local newspaper, the Communitist [sic], was launched in early 1844, issued fortnightly by the Skaneateles Community, at Community Place, near Mottville, promoted by the Vermont-born abolitionist and communalist John A. Collins.
