= Nehemiah H. Earll =

American politician

Nehemiah Hezekiah Earll

Member of the U.S. House of Representatives from 's 23rd district
- In office March 4, 1839 – March 3, 1841
- Preceded by: Bennet Bicknell
- Succeeded by: Victory Birdseye

Personal details
- Born: October 5, 1787
- Died: August 26, 1872 (aged 84) Mottville, New York, U.S.

Nehemiah Hezekiah Earll (October 5, 1787 – August 26, 1872) was a 19th-century American lawyer and politician who served one term as a U.S. representative from New York from 1839 to 1841.

He was a cousin of Congressman Jonas Earll, Jr..

== Biography ==
Born in Whitehall, New York, Earll moved with his parents to Onondaga Hollow in 1793, but nine months later he moved to Onondaga County and resided in Skaneateles until 1804. He attended the public schools and Fairfield Academy for two years and studied law.

=== Early career ===
He was admitted to the bar in 1809 and commenced practice in Salina (which in 1848 became a part of Syracuse), Onondaga County. During the War of 1812 he served as an adjutant in the Army at Oswego. After the war, he resumed the practice of law at Onondaga Hill, New York, in 1814.

He served as Postmaster of Onondaga Hill in 1816 and then was the Justice of the Peace in 1816–1820. He served as master in chancery for six years and was appointed the first judge of Onondaga County, serving from 1823 until his resignation in 1831. He served next as Superintendent of the Onondaga Salt Springs 1831–1836, when he resided in Syracuse, New York. He resigned, and engaged in the milling business in Jordan before returning to Syracuse, New York, in 1838.

=== Congress ===
Earll was elected as a Democrat to the Twenty-sixth Congress (March 4, 1839 – March 3, 1841). He was an unsuccessful candidate for reelection in 1840 to the Twenty-seventh Congress.

=== Retirement and death ===
He retired to private life, being blind for many years and died in Mottville, New York, August 26, 1872. He was interred in Oakwood Cemetery, Syracuse, New York.

U.S. House of Representatives
Preceded by Bennet Bicknell	Member of the U.S. House of Representatives from New York's 23rd congressional district March 4, 1839 – March 3, 1841	Succeeded by Victory Birdseye
