= John Moore (Louisiana politician) =

American politician (1788–1867)

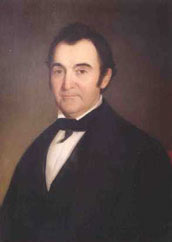

Member of the U.S. House of Representatives from Louisiana's 3rd district
- In office December 17, 1840 – March 3, 1843
- Preceded by: Rice Garland
- Succeeded by: John Bennett Dawson

Member of the U.S. House of Representatives from Louisiana's 4th district
- In office March 4, 1851 – March 3, 1853
- Preceded by: Isaac Edward Morse
- Succeeded by: Roland Jones

Personal details
- Born: 1788 Berkeley County, Virginia (now in West Virginia)
- Died: June 17, 1867 (aged 78–79) Franklin, Louisiana, U.S.
- Party: Whig Party

John Moore (1788 – June 17, 1867) was an American politician, planter and slaveholder from Louisiana. He served in the United States House of Representatives from 1840 to 1843 and again from 1851 to 1853. He was a lifelong member of the United States Whig Party.

== Biography ==
John Moore was born in 1788 in Berkeley County, Virginia (now part of West Virginia). He moved to Franklin, Louisiana for his education.

=== Political career ===
Moore was elected to the Louisiana House of Representatives for St. Mary Parish in 1825. He held that seat until 1834.

==== Congress ====
He was first elected to the United States Congress to replace Rice Garland and took his seat on December 17, 1840. He was re-elected in the general election and served until March 3, 1843.

=== Later career and death ===
Moore moved to Iberia Parish and married Mary Weeks, widow of the builder of the plantation Shadows-on-the-Teche. He was elected to the United States Congress again in 1850, serving a single term in 1851 to 1853; he was the last Whig elected to Congress from Louisiana. In 1861 Moore was a delegate to the Louisiana secession convention.

He died in Franklin, Louisiana on June 17, 1867, and was buried on his estate.

U.S. House of Representatives
Preceded by Rice Garland	Member of the U.S. House of Representatives from Louisiana's 3rd congressional district 1840 – 1843	Succeeded by John Bennett Dawson
Preceded by Isaac Edward Morse	Member of the U.S. House of Representatives from Louisiana's 4th congressional district 1851 – 1853	Succeeded by Roland Jones
