= Joel Holleman =

American politician and lawyer (1799–1844)

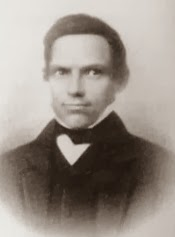

20th Speaker of the Virginia House of Delegates
- In office 1842–1844
- Preceded by: Valentine W. Southall
- Succeeded by: Valentine W. Southall

Member of the Virginia House of Delegates
- In office 1841–1844
- In office 1832–1836

Member of the U.S. House of Representatives from Virginia's 1st district
- In office March 4, 1839 – December 1840
- Preceded by: Francis Mallory
- Succeeded by: Francis Mallory

Member of the Virginia Senate
- In office 1836–1839

Personal details
- Born: October 1, 1799 Isle of Wight County, Virginia
- Died: August 5, 1844 (aged 44) Smithfield, Virginia
- Party: Democratic
- Spouse(s): Caroline Carroll (1822–1844); Emily W. Carroll (1844 – his death)
- Education: University of North Carolina
- Profession: lawyer

Joel Holleman (October 1, 1799 – August 5, 1844) was an American politician and lawyer from Virginia. A Democrat, he served in the United States House of Representatives and as Speaker of the Virginia House of Delegates.

== Personal life ==
Holleman was born in Isle of Wight County, Virginia to John Holleman and Nancy Thomas Holleman. He graduated from the University of North Carolina and attended law school there. He was a teacher before his admission to the bar. He eventually set up a law practice at Burwell Bay, Virginia, in Isle of Wight County. He was highly regarded by peers and recognized as a top lawyer in southern Virginia.

On November 22, 1828, Holleman married Caroline Carroll of Isle of Wight County. She died in 1842. He later married his sister-in-law, Emily W. Carroll.

== Political career ==
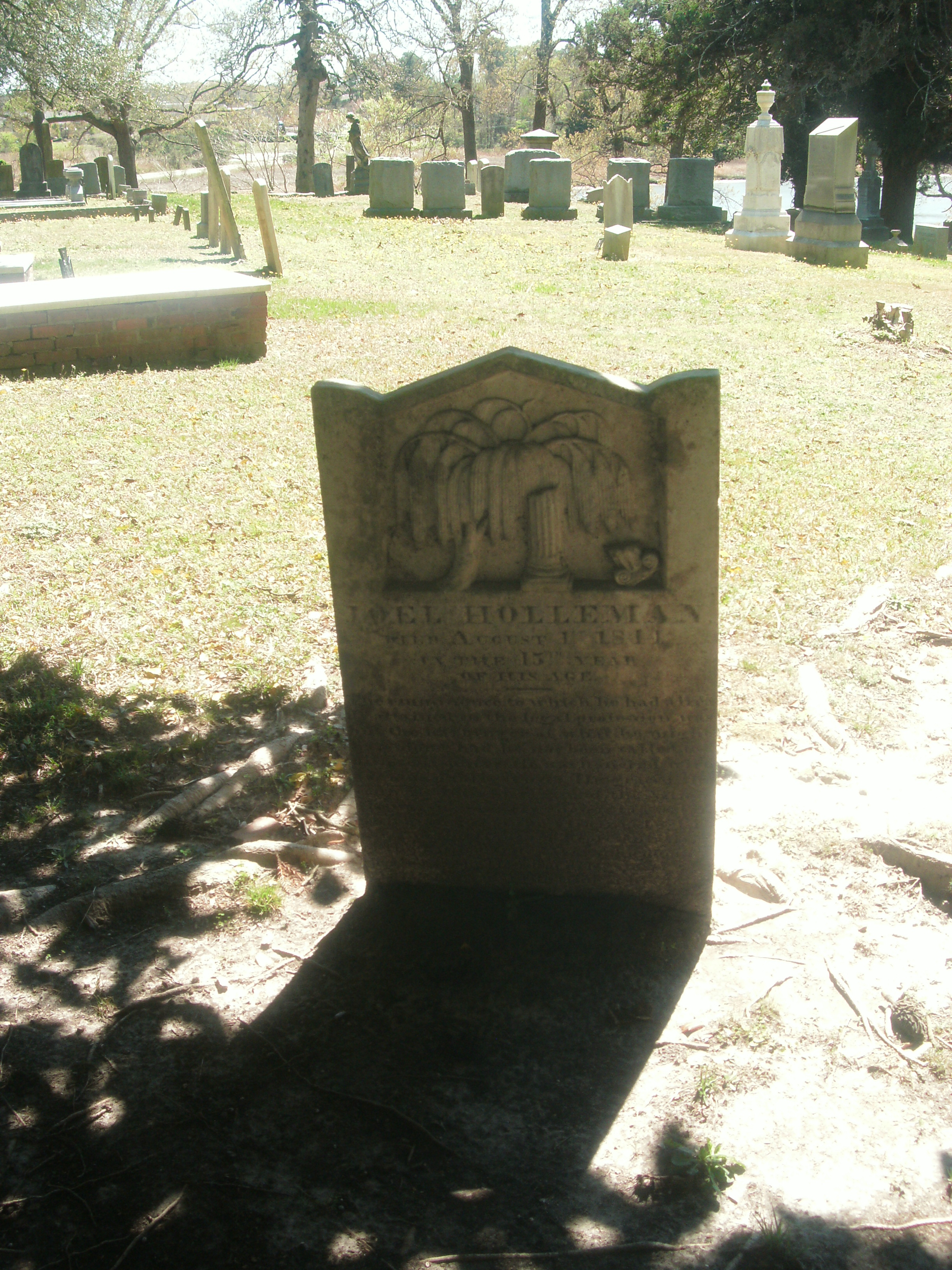
Holleman's grave at Ivy Hill Cemetery

Holleman was first elected to the Virginia House of Delegates in 1832. He moved to the Senate of Virginia in 1836.

Holleman was elected to the Twenty-sixth Congress, taking office in 1839. At the time of his election, he made a public statement that he would resign his seat if the Whigs won his district in the 1840 presidential election. After William Henry Harrison did so, Holleman resigned.

== After Congress ==
He was reelected to the House of Delegates in 1841 and became Speaker the following year.

On April 3, 1844, a few months before his death, he married his sister-in-law, Emily W. Carroll.

He died in Smithfield, Virginia, August 5, 1844 at the age of 44. He was interred in Ivy Hill Cemetery.

== Notes ==
Virginia House of Delegates
Preceded by	Member of the Virginia House of Delegates; 1832–1836	Succeeded by
Preceded by	Member of the Virginia House of Delegates; 1841–1844	Succeeded by
Senate of Virginia
Preceded by	Member of the Virginia State Senate; 1836–1839	Succeeded by
U.S. House of Representatives
Preceded by Francis Mallory	Member of the U.S. House of Representatives from Virginia's 1st congressional district 1839–1840	Succeeded by Francis Mallory
Political offices
Preceded by Valentine W. Southall	Speaker of the Virginia House of Delegates; 1842–1844	Succeeded by Valentine W. Southall
