= Ó Cléirigh =

O'Cleary Ó Cléirigh
- Parent house: Uí Fiachrach Aidhne
- Country: Kingdom of Connacht
- Founder: Cleireach mac Ceadach
- Final ruler: Mhic Mac Comhaltan Ua Cleirigh
- Titles: King of Uí Fiachrach Aidhne; Brehons of Tír Chonaill
- Cadet branches: Coulton; Kilkelly; Hynes

O'Cleary or O'Clery (Irish: Ó Cléirigh) is the surname of a Gaelic Irish family. It is one of the oldest recorded surnames in Europe Ó Cléirigh is anglicized as Cleary or often as Clark.

== Naming conventions ==
The name has been anglicised variously as O'Clery, Cleary, Clery, Clark, Clarke and Clarkson.

Male	Daughter	Wife (Long)	Wife (Short)
Ó Cléirigh	Ní Chléirigh	Bean Uí Chléirigh	Uí Chléirigh

== People with the surname ==
=== Ó Cléirigh ===
- Mac Comhaltan Ua Cleirigh, King of Uí Fiachrach Aidhne, fl. 964
- Lughaidh Ó Cléirigh (fl. 1595–1630)
- Mícheál Ó Cléirigh (ca. 1590–1643), considered the chief author of the chronicle of medieval Irish history known as the Annals of the Four Masters
- Cú Choigcríche Ó Cléirigh (died 1664)

=== O'Clery ===
- Keyes O'Clery
- Conor O'Clery

=== Cleary ===
- Bernard Cleary (1937–2020), Canadian politician
- Beverly Cleary (1916–2021), American author
- Bill Cleary (born 1934), American hockey player
- Brendan Cleary (born 1958), Irish poet
- Brian P. Cleary (born 1959), American humorist, poet and author
- Daniel Cleary (born 1978), Canadian hockey player
- Gabriel Cleary, Irish engineer
- Ivan Cleary, rugby league footballer and coach
- Joe Cleary (1918–2004), Irish baseball player
- John Cleary (disambiguation), several people
- Jon Cleary (1917–2010), Australian author
- Jon Cleary (musician) (born 1962), American musician
- Mark Cleary (professor) (born 1954), Vice-Chancellor of the University of Bradford
- Michael Cleary, several people
- Nikki Cleary (born 1988), American singer
- Paul Cleary (born 1976), Australian middle-distance runner
- Phil Cleary (born 1952), Australian commentator
- Patrick Roger Cleary, founder of Cleary University
- Sean Cleary (footballer) (born 1983), Irish football player
- Sean Cleary, Irish rugby league footballer
- Thomas Cleary, American author and translator
- William J. Cleary (1870–1952), American politician

=== Clarke ===
- Austin Clarke (poet) (1896–1974), Irish poet
- Henry Edward Clarke (1829–1892), businessman and politician in Ontario, Canada
- Henry Joseph Clarke (1833–1889), Premier of Manitoba, Canada, 1874–1878
- Peter Clarke (tennis) (born 1979), Irish tennis player
- Philip Clarke (politician) (1933–1995), Irish Republican Army member and politician
- Tom Clarke (Irish republican) (1857–1916), executed for his part in the 1916 Rising

== Other institutions ==
- Cleary University, a private business school in Michigan, United States
- Cleary Gottlieb Steen & Hamilton, an international law firm
- The Clery Act of United States law
- Clerys, an Irish department store

== See also ==
- McCleary (surname)
