= Cleary (surname) =

Cleary is an Irish surname, which derives from the Gaelic Ó Cléirigh/Mac Cleirigh, meaning 'descendant or son of cleric'. It is also often anglicized as Clark. Notable people with the surname include:

- Audrey Cleary (1930–2019), American politician and nurse
- Bernard Cleary (1937–2020), Canadian politician
- Beverly Cleary (1916–2021), American author
- Bill Cleary (born 1934), American hockey player
- Brendan Cleary (born 1958), Irish poet
- Brian P. Cleary (born 1959), American humorist, poet and author
- Daniel Cleary (born 1978), Canadian hockey player
- Eilish Cleary (1963–2024), Irish-Canadian physician and health advocate
- Gabriel Cleary (born 1945), Irish engineer
- Ivan Cleary (born 1971), Australian rugby league footballer and coach
- Joe Cleary (1918–2004), Irish baseball player
- John Cleary (disambiguation), many people
- Jon Cleary (1917–2010), Australian author
- Jon Cleary (musician) (born 1962), American musician
- Mark Cleary (professor) (born 1954), Vice-Chancellor of the University of Bradford
- Michael Cleary (disambiguation), various including
  - Michael Cleary (rugby) (born 1940), Australian politician and dual-code rugby footballer
  - Michael J. Cleary (1925–2020), Irish bishop
  - Michael Cleary (hurler) (born 1966), former Irish hurler for Nenagh Éire Óg and Tipperary
  - Father Michael Cleary (1934–1993), Irish Roman Catholic priest
- M. H. Cleary (1853–1933), American politician, lawyer, and physician
- Nathan Cleary (born 1997), Australian rugby league footballer
- Nikki Cleary (born 1988), American singer
- Paul Cleary (born 1976), Australian middle-distance runner
- Phil Cleary (born 1952), Australian commentator
- Patrick Roger Cleary (1858–1948), founder of Cleary University
- Russell G. Cleary (1933–1997), American businessman and lawyer
- Sean Cleary (footballer) (born 1983), Irish football player
- Sean Cleary (rugby league), Irish rugby league footballer
- Siobhán Cleary (born 1970), Irish Composer
- Thomas Cleary (1949–2021), author and translator
- Timothy Cleary, (1900–1962), New Zealand lawyer and judge
- William J. Cleary (1870–1952), American politician

== See also ==
- Cleary (disambiguation)
- McCleary
- Clary (surname)
