= William Cleary =

William Cleary may refer to:

- William E. Cleary (1849–1932), U.S. Representative from New York
- William J. Cleary (1870–1952), American politician
- William James Cleary (1885–1973), Australian brewery and railway executive
- William Castle Cleary (1886–1971), British civil servant
- Bill Cleary (Australian footballer) (1868–1942), Australian rules footballer
- Bill Cleary (footballer, born 1931) (1931–1991), English soccer player
- Bill Cleary (ice hockey) (born 1934), American ice hockey player and coach
- Bill Cleary (Irish footballer), Irish soccer player
