= Cleary =

Cleary may refer to:

- Cleary (surname), people with the surname Cleary
- Cleary, Mississippi, a census-designated place, United States
- Cleary, Missouri, a ghost town, United States
- Cleary University, a private business school, Michigan, United States
- Cleary Gottlieb Steen & Hamilton, an international law firm
