= John Adams (New York politician) =

American politician

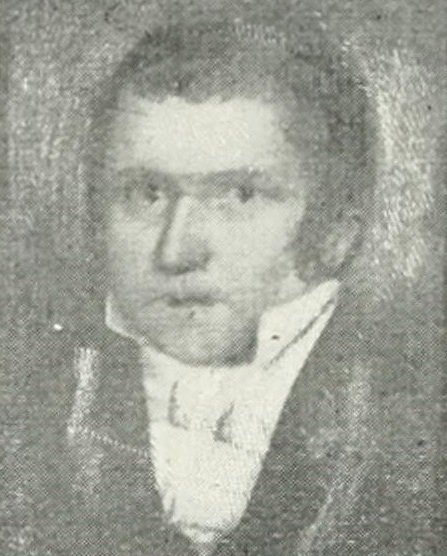

Member of the U.S. House of Representatives from New York's 8th district
- In office March 4, 1833 – March 3, 1835
- Preceded by: John King
- Succeeded by: Valentine Efner

Personal details
- Born: August 26, 1778 Oak Hill, New York, U.S.
- Died: September 25, 1854 (aged 76) Catskill, New York, U.S.
- Resting place: Thompson Street Cemetery, Catskill, New York, U.S.
- Party: Democratic
- Other political affiliations: Federalist
- Occupation: Teacher, lawyer, politician

John Adams (August 26, 1778 – September 25, 1854) was an American lawyer and politician who served one term as a United States Congressman from New York from 1833 to 1835.

== Life ==
John studied law, and taught school in Durham. John was admitted to the bar in 1805, and began to practice in Durham. John was Surrogate of Greene County, New York from 1810 to 1811.

=== Political career ===
He was a member of the New York State Assembly in 1812–13.

=== Congress ===
In April 1814, John ran as a Federalist for the 14th United States Congress, and was declared elected due to a mistake made by the deputy county clerk who had transcribed the returns. Credentials were issued by the Secretary of State of New York, but John Adams did not take or claim the seat. His Democratic-Republican opponent Erastus Root contested Adams's election and was seated on December 26, 1815.

John Adams was elected as a Jacksonian to the 23rd Congress, and served from March 4, 1833 to March 3, 1835.

=== Later career and death ===
Afterwards he resumed his law practice in Catskill. John also became a director of the Canajoharie and Catskill Railroad in 1835.

John was buried at the Thompson Street Cemetery in Catskill.

=== Family ===
State Senator Platt Adams (1792–1887) was his brother.

U.S. House of Representatives
Preceded by John King	Member of the U.S. House of Representatives from New York's 8th congressional district 1833–1835 with Aaron Vanderpoel	Succeeded by Valentine Efner, Aaron Vanderpoel
