= Sean Cleary =

Sean Cleary may refer to:

- Sean Cleary (footballer) (born 1983), Irish football player
- Sean Cleary (rugby league), Irish rugby league footballer
- Sean D. Cleary (born 1991), North Dakota economist and politician
