= Richard Tonry =

Richard Tonry may refer to:

- Richard A. Tonry (1935–2012), U.S. Representative from Louisiana
- Richard J. Tonry (1893–1971), U.S. Representative from New York
