= John King (New York congressman) =

American politician

Member of the U.S. House of Representatives from New York's 8th district
- In office March 4, 1831 – March 3, 1833
- Preceded by: James Strong
- Succeeded by: John Adams; Aaron Vanderpoel

Personal details
- Born: 1775 Kings District, Province of New York, British America (now Canaan, New York)
- Died: September 1, 1836 (aged 60–61) New Lebanon, New York, U.S.
- Party: Democratic

John King (1775 – September 1, 1836) was an American politician who served one term as a United States representative from New York from 1831 to 1833.

== Biography ==
John King was born in Kings District (now known as Canaan) in the Province of New York in 1775 where he attended the common schools. He was town supervisor of Canaan from 1806 to 1808; sheriff of Columbia County from 1811 to 1813 and 1815 to 1819, and town supervisor of New Lebanon, New York from 1819 to 1823, and in 1826 and 1829. He was a member of the New York State Assembly in 1824.

=== Congress ===
He was elected as a Democrat to the 22nd United States Congress (March 4, 1831 – March 3, 1833).

=== Death ===
He died in New Lebanon on September 1, 1836, and is interred in the Cemetery of Evergreens.

U.S. House of Representatives
Preceded by James Strong	Member of the U.S. House of Representatives from New York's 8th congressional district 1831–1833	Succeeded by John Adams; Aaron Vanderpoel
