= McClard =

McClard is a surname. Notable people with the surname include:

- Bill McClard (born 1950), American football player
- Kent McClard (born 1967), American record label owner and music journalist

== See also ==
- McClary
