= 1929 Aciéries d'Angleur Tournoi =

The 1929 Aciéries d'Angleur Tournoi, also known as the 1929 Tournoi d'Été de Liège, was an international football tournament hosted in Liège, Belgium. It was won by the subsequent 1929–30 League of Ireland champions, Bohemians. The tournament is notable in Republic of Ireland football history as the only occasion, to date, that a League of Ireland team has won a European trophy. In addition to Bohemians, three Belgian teams - Standard Liège, R.F.C. Tilleur-Saint-Nicolas and Royale Union Saint-Gilloise - also took part.

== Liège International Tournaments ==
Between 1908 and 1998 Liège regularly hosted an international football tournament. Local teams Standard Liège, RFC Liège and R.F.C. Tilleur-Saint-Nicolas were all regular participants. In addition to featuring other Belgian teams, the tournaments would also feature international guests from either England, Germany, France or the Netherlands. In 1929 Bohemians became the first and only Irish team to be invited. These tournaments were organized using a variety of names. However, during the 1920s and 1930s they were generally referred to as the Tournoi de Pâques de Liège or Liège Easter Tournament. Easter 1929 saw RFC Liège and R.F.C. Tilleur, along with Dulwich Hamlet and Racing Calais, compete in a tournament which had been won by Dulwich Hamlet after they beat R.F.C. Tilleur 3–1 in the final. Incidentally the 1931 Tournoi de Pâques de Liège would feature FC Prague Bohemians. The tournament that Bohemians participated in has been referred to either as the Aciéries d'Angleur Tournoi or the Tournoi d'Été de Liège. The latter translates into English as the Liège Summer Tournament. Aciéries d'Angleur was the name of a local steel manufacturing company originally based in the Liège districts of Tilleur and Angleur.

== Bohemians Tour of Belgium ==
Between 1928 and 1930 the Ireland and Belgium national teams played each other three times. On 12 February 1928 the two national teams had played at Stade Maurice Dufrasne in Liège with Ireland winning 4–2. Four Bohemians players - Harry Cannon, Jack McCarthy, Jeremiah Robinson and Jimmy White - had all featured in this game. McCarthy captained the Ireland team while White scored twice in the 4–2 win. These international matches subsequently resulted in Bohemians receiving an invite to play in the Aciéries d'Angleur Tournoi.

In August 1929 Bohemians embarked on a tour of Belgium. They subsequently played at least four games against Belgian teams. The game against Charleroi on 15 August resulted in a minor diplomatic incident when, as the teams were led out onto the pitch, the Union Jack rather than the flag of Ireland was raised, much to the consternation of the Bohemian club's management and the local Irish consul, Count Patrick J. O’Byrne. O’Byrne later recorded the details of the incident in a letter to Joseph Walshe. On 16 August a party representing Bohemians, led by Joe Wickham, met with Count O’Byrne and arranged to lay a wreath at the Tomb of the Unknown Soldier to honour the Irish dead of the First World War. A number of Bohemians players, including Harold Sloan, had served in the military during the war. Following the ceremony, O’Byrne also presented Bohemians with an Ireland flag in order to prevent a repeat of the Charleroi episode.

16 August also saw Bohemians play a game against a Royal Flemish XI. They subsequently left Brussels for Liège where they took part in the Aciéries d'Angleur Tournoi. This tournament featured four teams. In addition to Bohemians, three Belgian teams - Standard Liège, R.F.C. Tilleur-Saint-Nicolas and Royale Union Saint-Gilloise - also took part. However Bohemians never played the latter team. Bohemians were declared winners of the tournament after wins over both R.F.C. Tilleur and Standard Liège. On their return to Ireland, Bohemians were officially praised by the Dundalk chairman, P.J. Casey, at a meeting of the Football Association of Ireland.

== Friendly Matches ==
15 August 1929

(Belgium) Charleroi	1-2	(Republic of Ireland) Bohemians
	(Report)	Bill Dennis; Bill Cleary

Charleroi, Belgium
Attendance: 15,000
16 August 1929

(Belgium) Royal Flemish XI	0-1	(Republic of Ireland) Bohemians
	(Report)

Brussels, Belgium

== Tournament ==
=== First Day ===
17 August 1929

(Belgium) Saint-Gilloise	5-0	(Belgium) Standard Liège
	(Report)

Belgium
17 August 1929

(Belgium) R.F.C. Tilleur	0-1	(Republic of Ireland) Bohemians
	(Report)	Bill Cleary

Belgium

=== Second Day ===
18 August 1929

(Belgium) Saint-Gilloise	3-3	(Belgium) R.F.C. Tilleur
	(Report)

Belgium
18 August 1929

(Belgium) Standard Liège	2-3	(Republic of Ireland) Bohemians
	(Report)	Jimmy Bermingham; Bill Dennis; Johnny McMahon

Stade Maurice Dufrasne ? , Liège, Belgium

=== Table ===
Rank	Team	Pld	W	D	L	GF	GA	GD	Pts
1	(Republic of Ireland) Bohemians	2	2	0	0	4	2	+2	4
2	(Belgium) Saint-Gilloise	2	1	1	0	8	3	+5	3
3	(Belgium) R.F.C. Tilleur	2	0	1	1	3	4	-1	1
4	(Belgium) Standard Liège	2	0	0	2	2	8	−6	0
