= Senator Cleary =

Senator Cleary may refer to:

- Edward J. Cleary (1866–1942), Washington State Senate
- M. H. Cleary (1853–1933), Illinois State Senate
- Raymond Cleary (born 1948), South Carolina State Senate

== See also ==
- Cordell Cleare (born 1965), New York State Senate
- Senator Clary (disambiguation)
