= McCleery =

McCleery is a surname. Notable people with the surname include:

- Alan McCleery (born 1929), Canadian sprint canoeist
- Albert McCleery (1911–1972), American television producer
- Finnis D. McCleery (1927–2002), United States Army soldier of the Vietnam War
- James McCleery (1837–1871), American politician
- Joe McCleery, Irish football manager
- Michael McCleery (born 1959), American actor
- Nicola McCleery (born 1995), Scottish netball player
- William McCleery (politician) (1887–1957), Northern Irish politician

== See also ==
- McCleary
