= Clarey =

Clarey is a surname. Notable people with the surname include:

- Alec Clarey (born 1994), English rugby union player
- Bernard A. Clarey (1912–1996), admiral of the United States Navy
- Doug Clarey (born 1954), Major League Baseball infielder
- Percy Clarey (1890–1960), Australian trade union leader and politician

== See also ==
- Admiral Clarey Bridge, automobile bridge providing access to Ford Island, a US Navy installation in the middle of Pearl Harbor
- Clary (surname)
