= Donald Lawrence O'Toole =

American politician

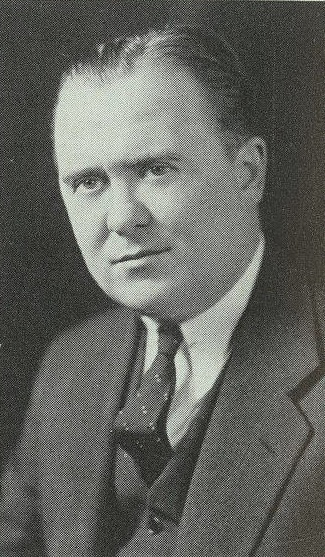

Member of the U.S. House of Representatives from New York
- In office January 3, 1937 – January 3, 1953
- Preceded by: Richard J. Tonry
- Succeeded by: Abraham J. Multer
- Constituency: 8th district (1937–1945); 13th district (1945–1953)

Personal details
- Born: August 1, 1902 Brooklyn, New York, U.S.
- Died: September 12, 1964 (aged 62) Ocala, Florida, U.S.
- Resting place: Holy Cross Cemetery, Brooklyn, New York
- Party: Democratic
- Spouse: Mary T. Martin
- Children: 3
- Education: Fordham University
- Profession: Attorney

Donald Lawrence O'Toole (August 1, 1902 – September 12, 1964) was an American lawyer and politician who served eight terms as a United States representative from New York from 1937 to 1953.

== Biography ==
Born in Brooklyn, he attended public and parochial schools, graduated from St. James Academy in Brooklyn in 1916, and from the law department of Fordham University in 1925. He was a postgraduate student at Columbia University and New York University, then was admitted to the bar in 1927, commencing practice in New York City.

=== Political career ===
He was a member of the board of aldermen from 1934 to 1936.

==== Congress ====
He was elected as a Democrat to the Seventy-fifth and to the seven succeeding Congresses, holding office from January 3, 1937, to January 3, 1953. He was an unsuccessful candidate for reelection in 1952 to the Eighty-third Congress and for election in 1954 to the Eighty-fourth Congress, and resumed the practice of law.

=== Later career and death ===
He also served as executive director of New York State Department of Commerce and Industry from 1955 to 1957 and commissioner of the department from August 1, 1958, to April 29, 1959.

A resident of Brooklyn, he died in Ocala, Florida, in 1964. Interment was in Holy Cross Cemetery, Brooklyn.

U.S. House of Representatives
Preceded by Richard J. Tonry	Member of the U.S. House of Representatives from New York's 8th congressional district 1937–1945	Succeeded by Joseph L. Pfeifer
Preceded by Louis J. Capozzoli	Member of the U.S. House of Representatives from New York's 13th congressional district 1945–1953	Succeeded by Abraham J. Multer
