= Dorrance Kirtland =

American politician (1770–1840)

Member of the U.S. House of Representatives from New York's 8th district
- In office March 4, 1817 – March 3, 1819
- Preceded by: Erastus Root
- Succeeded by: Robert Clark

Personal details
- Born: July 28, 1770 Coxsackie, New York, U.S.
- Died: May 23, 1840 (aged 69) Coxsackie, New York, U.S.
- Resting place: Old Coxsackie Cemetery, Coxsackie, New York, U.S.
- Party: Democratic-Republican
- Education: Yale College
- Profession: Politician, lawyer

Dorrance Kirtland (July 28, 1770 – May 23, 1840) was a U.S. representative from New York.

Born in Coxsackie, New York, Kirtland graduated from Yale College in 1789, studied law, was admitted to the bar, and commenced practice in Coxsackie.

From 1808 to 1838 Kirtland was Surrogate Judge of Greene County. In 1830 he published a book on surrogate court laws and procedure, A Treatise on the Practice in Surrogates' Courts in the State of New York.

Kirtland was elected as a Democratic-Republican to the Fifteenth Congress (March 4, 1817 – March 3, 1819).

He served as Judge of Greene County's Court of Common Pleas from 1828 to 1838.

Kirtland died in Coxsackie on May 23, 1840, and was interred in Old Coxsackie Cemetery.

== Sources ==
- United States Congress. "Dorrance Kirtland (id: K000243)". Biographical Directory of the United States Congress.

U.S. House of Representatives
Preceded by Erastus Root	Member of the U.S. House of Representatives from New York's 8th congressional district 1817–1819	Succeeded by Robert Clark
