= James T. Carroll (New York politician) =

Lawyer from New York

James T. Carroll (January 18, 1875 – October 20, 1940) was an American lawyer and politician from New York.

== Life ==
Carroll was born on January 18, 1875, in Brooklyn, New York, the son of James G. Carroll, a Bay Ridge builder and American Civil War veteran.

Carroll attended St. Francis College. He graduated from Brooklyn Law School with an LL.B. in 1916, when he was 41. He was admitted to the bar later that year and worked as a lawyer.

Carroll served in the 13th and 14th Infantry of the New York National Guard, and during the Spanish–American War he was a private in the United States Army Hospital Corps. He served with the 11th Field Artillery Regiment on the Mexican border in Arizona. During World War I, he served with the 11th as a sergeant and fought in the Meuse–Argonne offensive with the 89th Division. He served in France for ten months. His son Charles also served in France with the Navy's aeronautical branch.

In 1919, Carroll was elected to the New York State Assembly as a Republican, representing the Kings County 9th District. He served in the Assembly in 1920 and 1921. In 1920, he was chairman of a conference of 31 service men that considered and promoted World War I veterans' welfare measures. In that year, he was among those who voted to expel the five Socialists from the Assembly. He was an Assistant United States Attorney from 1923 to 1934. He was retired for several years by the time he died.

Carroll was prominently involved in the United Spanish War Veterans in Brooklyn, serving as head of the organization in Kings County in 1916. He was also a member of the American Legion, the Brooklyn Bar Association, the 11th Field Artillery Veterans Association, and Theta Phi. His wife's name was Daisy, and his children were Mrs. Richard A. McCormack, Mrs. William A. Duffy, Mrs. Edward Michaels, Mrs. James Traidor, May, Charles A., and Paul.

Carroll died at home from heart disease on October 20, 1940. He was buried in Holy Cross Cemetery.

New York State Assembly
Preceded by Frederick S. Burr	New York State Assembly; Kings County, 9th District; 1920–1921	Succeeded by Richard J. Tonry
