= New York's 8th congressional district =

U.S. House district for New York

- Interactive map of district boundaries since January 3, 2025
- Representative: Hakeem Jeffries; D–Brooklyn
- Distribution: 100% urban
- Population (2025): 730,062
- Median household income: $69,292
- Ethnicity: 42.2% Black; 27.4% White; 16.2% Hispanic; 8.8% Asian; 4.3% Two or more races; 1.1% other
- Cook PVI: D+24

New York's 8th congressional district for the U.S. House of Representatives is in the New York City borough of Brooklyn. It is currently represented by Representative Hakeem Jeffries, the House Minority Leader. It is the third poorest congressional district in New York state, with a median income of $59,764, per a 2024 study. The district also ranks fourth in the state with its poverty rate at 20.3 percent, per a 2026 congressional study.

From 1993 to 2013, the district covered much of the west side of Manhattan, and western coastal sections of Brooklyn. However, after decennial redistricting, it was redrawn to take in much of the territory previously in the 10th district. It now encompasses majority African-American and Caribbean-American Bedford-Stuyvesant, Brownsville, Canarsie, East New York, Ocean Hill, Spring Creek, and East Flatbush; the mostly white neighborhoods of Bergen Beach, Gerritsen Beach, Howard Beach, Marine Park, Mill Basin, and Sea Gate; and mixed neighborhoods like Clinton Hill, Flatlands, Fort Greene, Ozone Park, Brighton Beach, and Coney Island. Most of the old 8th was renumbered as the 10th.

== Recent election results from statewide races ==
Year	Office	Results
2008	President	Obama 82% - 18%
2012	President	Obama 86% - 14%
2016	President	Clinton 80% - 18%
2016	Senate	Schumer 87% - 11%
2018	Senate	Gillibrand 86% - 14%
2018	Governor	Cuomo 84% - 14%
2018	Attorney General	James 85% - 14%
2020	President	Biden 77% - 22%
2022	Senate	Schumer 74% - 25%
2022	Governor	Hochul 72% - 28%
2022	Attorney General	James 73% - 27%
2022	Comptroller	DiNapoli 74% - 26%
2024	President	Harris 71% - 27%
2024	Senate	Gillibrand 74% - 25%

== History ==
1913–1963:

Parts of Brooklyn

1963–1983:

Parts of Queens

1983–1993:

Parts of Bronx, Nassau, Queens

1993–2013:

Parts of Brooklyn, Manhattan

2013–2023:

Parts of Brooklyn, Queens

2023–present:

Parts of Brooklyn

Various New York districts have been numbered "8" over the years, including areas in New York City and various parts of upstate New York. The state's congressional districts had been redrawn in a manner that puts much of the territory of the old 10th Congressional district into the new 8th Congressional district. The election had a few competitors for what was then an open seat, with the 10th incumbent congressman Edolphus Towns retiring. State assemblyman Hakeem Jeffries faced off against New York City Councilman Charles Barron. Jeffries won the primary and ultimately the general election.

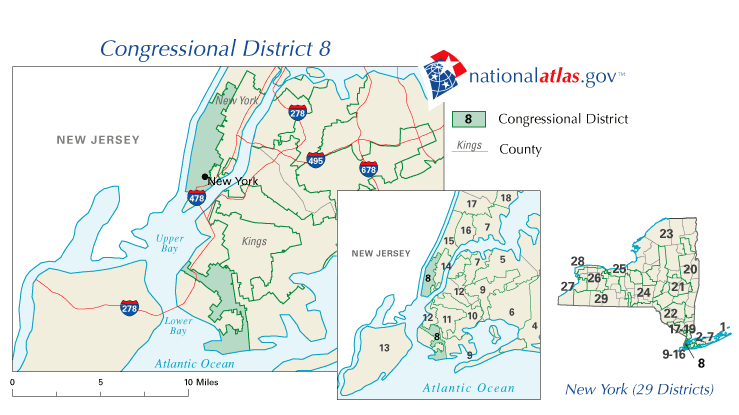
2003–2013

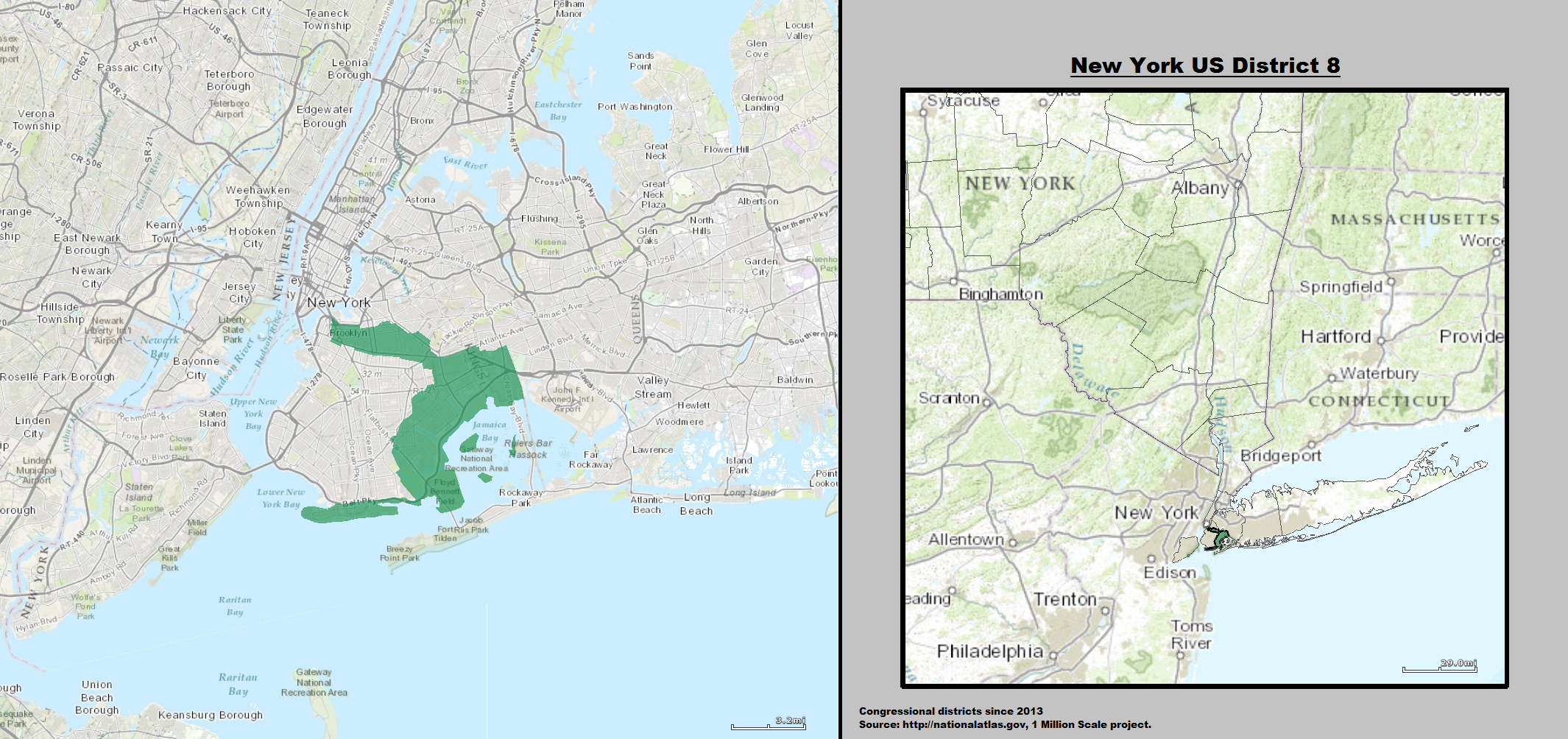
2013–2023

== Current composition ==
The 8th district is located entirely in the New York City borough of Brooklyn. Brooklyn neighborhoods in the district include:

- Bedford-Stuyvesant
- Bergen Beach
- Brighton Beach
- Brownsville
- Canarsie
- Coney Island
- City Line
- East New York
- Gerritsen Beach
- Gravesend
- Homecrest
- Manhattan Beach
- Marine Park
- Mill Basin
- New Lots
- Ocean Hill
- Sea Gate
- Sheepshead Bay
- Spring Creek
- Starrett City

== List of members representing the district ==
=== 1793–1833: one seat ===
Representative	Party	Years	Cong ress	Electoral history	Location
District established March 4, 1793
Henry Glen (Schenectady)	Pro-Administration	March 4, 1793 – March 3, 1795	3rd 4th 5th 6th	Elected in 1793. Re-elected in 1794. Re-elected in 1796. Re-elected in 1798. Lost re-election.	1793–1803 [data missing]
Henry Glen (Schenectady)	Federalist	March 4, 1795 – March 3, 1801	3rd 4th 5th 6th	Elected in 1793. Re-elected in 1794. Re-elected in 1796. Re-elected in 1798. Lost re-election.	1793–1803 [data missing]
Killian K. Van Rensselaer (Albany)	Federalist	March 4, 1801 – March 3, 1803	7th	Elected in 1800. Redistricted to the 9th district.	1793–1803 [data missing]
Henry W. Livingston (Livingston)	Federalist	March 4, 1803 – March 3, 1807	8th 9th	Elected in 1802. Re-elected in 1804. [data missing]	1803–1813 [data missing]
James I. Van Alen (Kinderhook)	Democratic-Republican	March 4, 1807 – March 3, 1809	10th	Elected in 1806. Lost re-election.	1803–1813 [data missing]
John Thompson (Stillwater)	Democratic-Republican	March 4, 1809 – March 3, 1811	11th	Redistricted from the 11th district and re-elected in 1808. [data missing]	1803–1813 [data missing]
Benjamin Pond (Schroon)	Democratic-Republican	March 4, 1811 – March 3, 1813	12th	Elected in 1810. [data missing]	1803–1813 [data missing]
Samuel Sherwood (Delhi)	Federalist	March 4, 1813 – March 3, 1815	13th	Elected in 1812. [data missing]	1813–1823; Delaware and Greene counties
Vacant		March 4, 1815 – December 26, 1815	14th	Credentials had been issued for John Adams (Fed.), but Adams did not take or claim the seat, see 1814 United States House of Representatives elections in New York.	1813–1823; Delaware and Greene counties
Erastus Root (Delhi)	Democratic-Republican	December 26, 1815 – March 3, 1817	14th	Successfully contested Adams's election. [data missing]	1813–1823; Delaware and Greene counties
Dorrance Kirtland (Coxsackie)	Democratic-Republican	March 4, 1817 – March 3, 1819	15th	Elected in 1816. [data missing]	1813–1823; Delaware and Greene counties
Robert Clark (Delhi)	Democratic-Republican	March 4, 1819 – March 3, 1821	16th	Elected in 1818. [data missing]	1813–1823; Delaware and Greene counties
Vacant		March 4, 1821 – December 3, 1821	17th	Elections were held in April 1821. It is unclear when results were announced or credentials issued.	1813–1823; Delaware and Greene counties
Richard McCarty (Coxsackie)	Democratic-Republican	December 3, 1821 – March 3, 1823	17th	Elected in 1821. [data missing]	1813–1823; Delaware and Greene counties
James Strong (Hudson)	Adams-Clay Federalist	March 4, 1823 – March 3, 1825	18th 19th 20th 21st	Elected in 1822. Re-elected in 1824. Re-elected in 1826. Re-elected in 1828. [data missing]	1823–1833; Columbia County
James Strong (Hudson)	Anti-Jacksonian	March 4, 1825 – March 3, 1831	18th 19th 20th 21st	Elected in 1822. Re-elected in 1824. Re-elected in 1826. Re-elected in 1828. [data missing]	1823–1833; Columbia County
John King (New Lebanon)	Jacksonian	March 4, 1831 – March 3, 1833	22nd	Elected in 1830. [data missing]	1823–1833; Columbia County

=== 1833–1843: two seats ===
From 1833 to 1843, two seats were apportioned to the district, elected at-large on a general ticket.

Cong ress	Years	Seat A			Seat B		
Cong ress	Years	Representative	Party	Electoral history	Representative	Party	Electoral history
23rd	March 4, 1833 – March 3, 1835	John Adams (Catskill)	Jacksonian	Elected in 1832.	Aaron Vanderpoel (Kinderhook)	Jacksonian	Elected in 1832.
24th	March 4, 1835 – March 3, 1837	Valentine Efner (Jefferson)	Jacksonian	Elected in 1834.	Aaron Vanderpoel (Kinderhook)	Jacksonian	Re-elected in 1834. Lost re-election.
25th	March 4, 1837 – March 3, 1839	Zadock Pratt (Prattsville)	Democratic	Elected in 1836. Retired.	Robert McClellan (Middleburgh)	Democratic	Elected in 1836
26th	March 4, 1839 – March 3, 1841	John Ely (Coxsackie)	Democratic	Elected in 1838.	Aaron Vanderpoel (Kinderhook)	Democratic	Elected in 1838. Retired.
27th	March 4, 1841 – March 3, 1843	Jacob Houck Jr. (Schoharie)	Democratic	Elected in 1840.	Robert McClellan (Hudson)	Democratic	Elected in 1840.

=== 1843–present: one seat ===
The 8th district was a Queens-based seat until the 1992 redistricting. At that time much of the old 8th district became the 5th district. The new 8th district was created by cobbling together portions of the Manhattan-based 17th district and the 13th district in Brooklyn.

Representative	Party	Years	Cong ress	Electoral history	District location
Richard D. Davis (Poughkeepsie)	Democratic	March 4, 1843 – March 3, 1845	28th	Redistricted from 5th district and re-elected in 1842. [data missing]	
William W. Woodworth (Hyde Park)	Democratic	March 4, 1845 – March 3, 1847	29th	Elected in 1844. [data missing]	
Cornelius Warren (Cold Spring)	Whig	March 4, 1847 – March 3, 1849	30th	Elected in 1846. [data missing]	
Ransom Halloway (Beekman)	Whig	March 4, 1849 – March 3, 1851	31st	Elected in 1848. [data missing]	
Gilbert Dean (Poughkeepsie)	Democratic	March 4, 1851 – March 3, 1853	32nd	Elected in 1850. Redistricted to 12th district	
Francis B. Cutting (New York)	Democratic	March 4, 1853 – March 3, 1855	33rd	Elected in 1852. [data missing]	
Abram Wakeman (New York)	Whig	March 4, 1855 – March 3, 1857	34th	Elected in 1854. [data missing]	
Horace F. Clark (New York)	Democratic	March 4, 1857 – March 3, 1859	35th 36th	Elected in 1856. Re-elected in 1858. [data missing]	
Horace F. Clark (New York)	Anti-Lecompton Democrat	March 4, 1859 – March 3, 1861	35th 36th	Elected in 1856. Re-elected in 1858. [data missing]	
Isaac C. Delaplaine (New York)	Democratic	March 4, 1861 – March 3, 1863	37th	Elected in 1860. [data missing]	
James Brooks (New York)	Democratic	March 4, 1863 – April 7, 1866	38th 39th	Elected in 1862. Re-elected in 1864. [data missing]	
William E. Dodge (New York)	Republican	April 7, 1866 – March 3, 1867	39th	Successfully contested election of James Brooks to the 39th Congress	
James Brooks (New York)	Democratic	March 4, 1867 – March 3, 1873	40th 41st 42nd	Elected in 1866. Re-elected in 1868. Re-elected in 1870. Redistricted to 6th district	
John D. Lawson (New York)	Republican	March 4, 1873 – March 3, 1875	43rd	Elected in 1872. [data missing]	
Elijah Ward (New York)	Democratic	March 4, 1875 – March 3, 1877	44th	Elected in 1874. [data missing]	
Anson G. McCook (New York)	Republican	March 4, 1877 – March 3, 1883	45th 46th 47th	Elected in 1876. Re-elected in 1878. Re-elected in 1880. [data missing]	
John J. Adams (New York)	Democratic	March 4, 1883 – March 3, 1885	48th	Redistricted from 7th district and re-elected in 1882. [data missing]	
Samuel S. Cox (New York)	Democratic	March 4, 1885 – May 20, 1885	49th	Elected in 1884. Resigned to become Envoy Extraordinary and Minister Plenipotentiary to the Ottoman Empire	
Vacant		May 20, 1885 – November 3, 1885	49th		
Timothy J. Campbell (New York)	Democratic	November 3, 1885 – March 3, 1889	49th 50th	Elected to finish Cox's term. Re-elected in 1886. [data missing]	
John H. McCarthy (New York)	Democratic	March 4, 1889 – January 14, 1891	51st	Elected in 1888. Resigned to become Justice of the City Court of New York City	
Vacant		January 14, 1891 – March 3, 1891	51st		
Timothy J. Campbell (New York)	Democratic	March 4, 1891 – March 3, 1893	52nd	Elected in 1890. [data missing]	
Edward J. Dunphy (New York)	Democratic	March 4, 1893 – March 3, 1895	53rd	Redistricted from 7th district and re-elected in 1892. [data missing]	
James J. Walsh (New York)	Democratic	March 4, 1895 – June 2, 1896	54th	Elected in 1894. Unseated in contested election.	
John M. Mitchell (New York)	Republican	June 2, 1896 – March 3, 1899	54th 55th	Successfully contested election of James J. Walsh. Re-elected in 1896. [data missing]	
Daniel J. Riordan (New York)	Democratic	March 4, 1899 – March 3, 1901	56th	Elected in 1898. [data missing]	
Thomas J. Creamer (New York)	Democratic	March 4, 1901 – March 3, 1903	57th	Elected in 1900. [data missing]	
Timothy D. Sullivan (New York)	Democratic	March 4, 1903 – July 27, 1906	58th 59th	Elected in 1902. Re-elected in 1904. Resigned.	
Vacant		July 27, 1906 – November 6, 1906	59th		
Daniel J. Riordan (New York)	Democratic	November 6, 1906 – March 3, 1913	59th 60th 61st 62nd	Elected to finish Sullivan's term. Re-elected in 1906. Re-elected in 1908. Re-elected in 1910. Redistricted to 11th district.	
Daniel J. Griffin (Brooklyn)	Democratic	March 4, 1913 – December 31, 1917	63rd 64th 65th	Elected in 1912. Re-elected in 1914. Re-elected in 1916. Resigned on election as sheriff of Kings County.	
Vacant		January 1, 1918 – March 5, 1918	65th		
William E. Cleary (Brooklyn)	Democratic	March 5, 1918 – March 3, 1921	65th 66th	Elected in 1918. [data missing]	
Charles G. Bond (Brooklyn)	Republican	March 4, 1921 – March 3, 1923	67th	Elected in 1920. Lost re-election.	
William E. Cleary (Brooklyn)	Democratic	March 4, 1923 – March 3, 1927	68th 69th	Elected in 1922. Re-elected in 1924. [data missing]	
Patrick J. Carley (Brooklyn)	Democratic	March 4, 1927 – January 3, 1935	70th 71st 72nd 73rd	Elected in 1926. Re-elected in 1928. Re-elected in 1930. Re-elected in 1932. [data missing]	
Richard J. Tonry (Brooklyn)	Democratic	January 3, 1935 – January 3, 1937	74th	Elected in 1934. [data missing]	
Donald L. O'Toole (Brooklyn)	Democratic	January 3, 1937 – January 3, 1945	75th 76th 77th 78th	Elected in 1936. Re-elected in 1938. Re-elected in 1940. Re-elected in 1942. Redistricted to 13th district	
Joseph L. Pfeifer (Brooklyn)	Democratic	January 3, 1945 – January 3, 1951	79th 80th 81st	Redistricted from 3rd district and re-elected in 1944. Re-elected in 1946. Re-elected in 1948.	
Victor Anfuso (Brooklyn)	Democratic	January 3, 1951 – January 3, 1953	82nd	Elected in 1950. Retired.	
Louis B. Heller (Brooklyn)	Democratic	January 3, 1953 – July 21, 1954	83rd	Redistricted from 7th district and re-elected in 1952. Resigned.	
Vacant		July 22, 1954 – January 2, 1955	83rd		
Victor Anfuso (Brooklyn)	Democratic	January 3, 1955 – January 3, 1963	84th 85th 86th 87th	Elected in 1954. Re-elected in 1956. Re-elected in 1958. Re-elected in 1960. Retired to run for New York Supreme Court	
Benjamin Rosenthal (Queens)	Democratic	January 3, 1963 – January 3, 1983	88th 89th 90th 91st 92nd 93rd 94th 95th 96th 97th	Redistricted from 6th district and re-elected in 1962. Re-elected in 1964. Re-elected in 1966. Re-elected in 1968. Re-elected in 1970. Re-elected in 1972. Re-elected in 1974. Re-elected in 1976. Re-elected in 1978. Re-elected in 1980. Redistricted to 7th district	
James H. Scheuer (Queens)	Democratic	January 3, 1983 – January 3, 1993	98th 99th 100th 101st 102nd	Redistricted from 11th district and re-elected in 1982. Re-elected in 1984. Re-elected in 1986. Re-elected in 1988. Re-elected in 1990. Retired.	
Jerry Nadler (New York)	Democratic	January 3, 1993 – January 3, 2013	103rd 104th 105th 106th 107th 108th 109th 110th 111th 112th	Redistricted from 17th district and elected to full term in 1992. Re-elected in 1994. Re-elected in 1996. Re-elected in 1998. Re-elected in 2000. Re-elected in 2002. Re-elected in 2004. Re-elected in 2006. Re-elected in 2008. Re-elected in 2010. Redistricted to 10th district.	1993–2003 [data missing]
Jerry Nadler (New York)	Democratic	January 3, 1993 – January 3, 2013	103rd 104th 105th 106th 107th 108th 109th 110th 111th 112th	Redistricted from 17th district and elected to full term in 1992. Re-elected in 1994. Re-elected in 1996. Re-elected in 1998. Re-elected in 2000. Re-elected in 2002. Re-elected in 2004. Re-elected in 2006. Re-elected in 2008. Re-elected in 2010. Redistricted to 10th district.	2003–2013; Parts of Brooklyn, Manhattan
Hakeem Jeffries (Brooklyn)	Democratic	January 3, 2013 – present	113th 114th 115th 116th 117th 118th 119th	Elected in 2012. Re-elected in 2014. Re-elected in 2016. Re-elected in 2018. Re-elected in 2020. Re-elected in 2022. Re-elected in 2024. Re-elected in 2026.	2013–2023; Parts of Brooklyn, Queens
Hakeem Jeffries (Brooklyn)	Democratic	January 3, 2013 – present	113th 114th 115th 116th 117th 118th 119th	Elected in 2012. Re-elected in 2014. Re-elected in 2016. Re-elected in 2018. Re-elected in 2020. Re-elected in 2022. Re-elected in 2024. Re-elected in 2026.	2023–2025; Parts of Brooklyn
Hakeem Jeffries (Brooklyn)	Democratic	January 3, 2013 – present	113th 114th 115th 116th 117th 118th 119th	Elected in 2012. Re-elected in 2014. Re-elected in 2016. Re-elected in 2018. Re-elected in 2020. Re-elected in 2022. Re-elected in 2024. Re-elected in 2026.	2025–present Parts of Brooklyn

== Recent election results ==
In New York electoral politics there are numerous minor parties at various points on the political spectrum. Certain parties will invariably endorse either the Republican or Democratic candidate for every office, hence the state electoral results contain both the party votes, and the final candidate votes (Listed as "Recap").

U.S. House election, 1870: New York District 8
Party	Candidate	Votes	%	±%
Democratic	James Brooks (incumbent)	12,845	53.0	
Republican	George Wilkes	7,149	29.5	
Independent	Julius Wadsworth	4,243	17.5	
Majority		5,696	23.5	
Turnout		24,237	100	

[data missing]

U.S. House election, 1996: New York District 8
Party	Candidate	Votes	%	±%
Democratic	Jerry Nadler (incumbent)	131,943	82.3	
Republican	Michael Benjamin	26,028	16.2	
Conservative	George A. Galip, Jr.	2,381	1.5	
Majority		105,915	66.1	
Turnout		160,352	100	

U.S. House election, 1998: New York District 8
Party	Candidate	Votes	%	±%
Democratic	Jerry Nadler (incumbent)	112,948	86.0	+3.7
Republican	Theodore Howard	18,383	14.0	−2.2
Majority		94,565	72.0	+5.9
Turnout		131,331	100	−18.1

U.S. House election, 2000: New York District 8
Party	Candidate	Votes	%	±%
Democratic	Jerry Nadler (incumbent)	150,273	81.2	−4.8
Republican	Marian S. Henry	27,057	14.6	+0.6
Green	Dan Wentzel	4,765	2.6	+2.6
Conservative	Anthony A. LaBella	1,849	1.0	+1.0
Independence	Harry Kresky	1,025	0.6	+0.6
Majority		123,216	66.6	−5.4
Turnout		184,969	100	+40.8

U.S. House election, 2002: New York District 8
Party	Candidate	Votes	%	±%
Democratic	Jerry Nadler (incumbent)	81,002	76.1	−5.1
Republican	Jim Farrin	19,674	18.5	+3.9
Conservative	Alan Jay Gerber	3,361	3.2	+2.2
Green	Dan Wentzel	1,918	1.8	−0.8
Libertarian	Joseph Dobrain	526	0.5	+0.5
Majority		61,328	57.6	−9.0
Turnout		106,481	100	−42.4

U.S. House election, 2004: New York District 8
Party	Candidate	Votes	%	±%
Democratic	Jerry Nadler (incumbent)	162,082	80.5	+4.4
Republican	Peter Hort	39,240	19.5	+1.0
Majority		122,842	61.0	+3.4
Turnout		201,322	100	+89.1

U.S. House election, 2006: New York District 8
Party	Candidate	Votes	%	±%
Democratic	Jerry Nadler (incumbent)	108,536	85.0	+4.5
Republican	Eleanor Friedman	17,413	13.6	−5.9
Conservative	Dennis E. Adornato	1,673	1.3	+1.3
Majority		91,123	71.4	+10.4
Turnout		127,622	100	−36.6

U.S. House election, 2008: New York District 8
Party	Candidate	Votes	%	±%
Democratic	Jerry Nadler (incumbent)	160,775	80.5	−4.5
Republican	Grace Lin	39,062	19.5	+5.9
Majority		121,713	61.0	−10.4
Turnout		199,837	100	+56.6

U.S. House election, 2010: New York District 8
Party	Candidate	Votes	%	±%
Democratic	Jerry Nadler (incumbent)	98,839	75.5	−5.0
Republican	Susan L. Kone	31,996	24.5	+5.0
Majority		66,843	51.0	−10.0
Turnout		130,835	100	−34.5

U.S. House election, 2012: New York District 8
Party	Candidate	Votes	%	±%
Democratic	Hakeem Jeffries	184,038	90.2	+14.7
Republican	Alan Bellone	17,650	8.7	−15.9
Green	Colin Beavan	2,441	1.2	+1.2
Majority		166,388	81.2	+31.2

U.S. House election, 2014: New York District 8
Party	Candidate	Votes	%	±%
Democratic	Hakeem Jeffries (incumbent)	77,255	92.1	+1.9
Conservative	Alan Bellone	6,673	8.0	−0.7
Majority		70,582	84.1	+2.9

U.S. House election, 2016: New York District 8
Party	Candidate	Votes	%	±%
Democratic	Hakeem Jeffries (incumbent)	214,595	93.3	+1.2
Conservative	Daniel Cavanagh	15,401	6.7	−1.3
Majority		229,996	86.6	+2.5

U.S. House election, 2018: New York District 8
Party	Candidate	Votes	%	±%
Democratic	Hakeem Jeffries (incumbent)	180,376	94.3	+1.0
Conservative	Ernest Johnson	9,997	5.2	−1.5
Reform	Jessica White	1,031	0.5	+0.5
Majority		191,404	89.1	+2.5

U.S. House election, 2020: New York District 8
Party	Candidate	Votes	%
Democratic	Hakeem Jeffries	207,111	74.8
Working Families	Hakeem Jeffries	27,822	10.0
Total	Hakeem Jeffries (incumbent)	234,933	84.8
Republican	Garfield Wallace	39,124	14.1
Conservative	Garfield Wallace	2,883	1.1
Total	Garfield Wallace	42,007	15.2
Total votes		276,940	100.0
Democratic hold			

U.S. House election, 2022: New York District 8
Party	Candidate	Votes	%
Democratic	Hakeem Jeffries (incumbent)	99,079	71.6
Republican	Yuri Dashevsky	36,776	26.5
Conservative	Yuri Dashevsky	2,284	1.6
Total	Yuri Dashevsky	39,060	28.2
Write-in		191	0.1
Total votes		138,330	100.0

U.S. House election, 2024: New York District 8
Party	Candidate	Votes	%
Democratic	Hakeem Jeffries (incumbent)	168,036	75.4
Republican	John Delaney	48,369	21.7
Conservative	John Delaney	6,494	2.9
Total	John Delaney	54,863	24.6
Total votes		222,899	100.0
Democratic hold			

== See also ==
- List of United States congressional districts
- New York's congressional delegations
- New York's congressional districts
