= Daniel J. Griffin =

American politician (1880–1926)

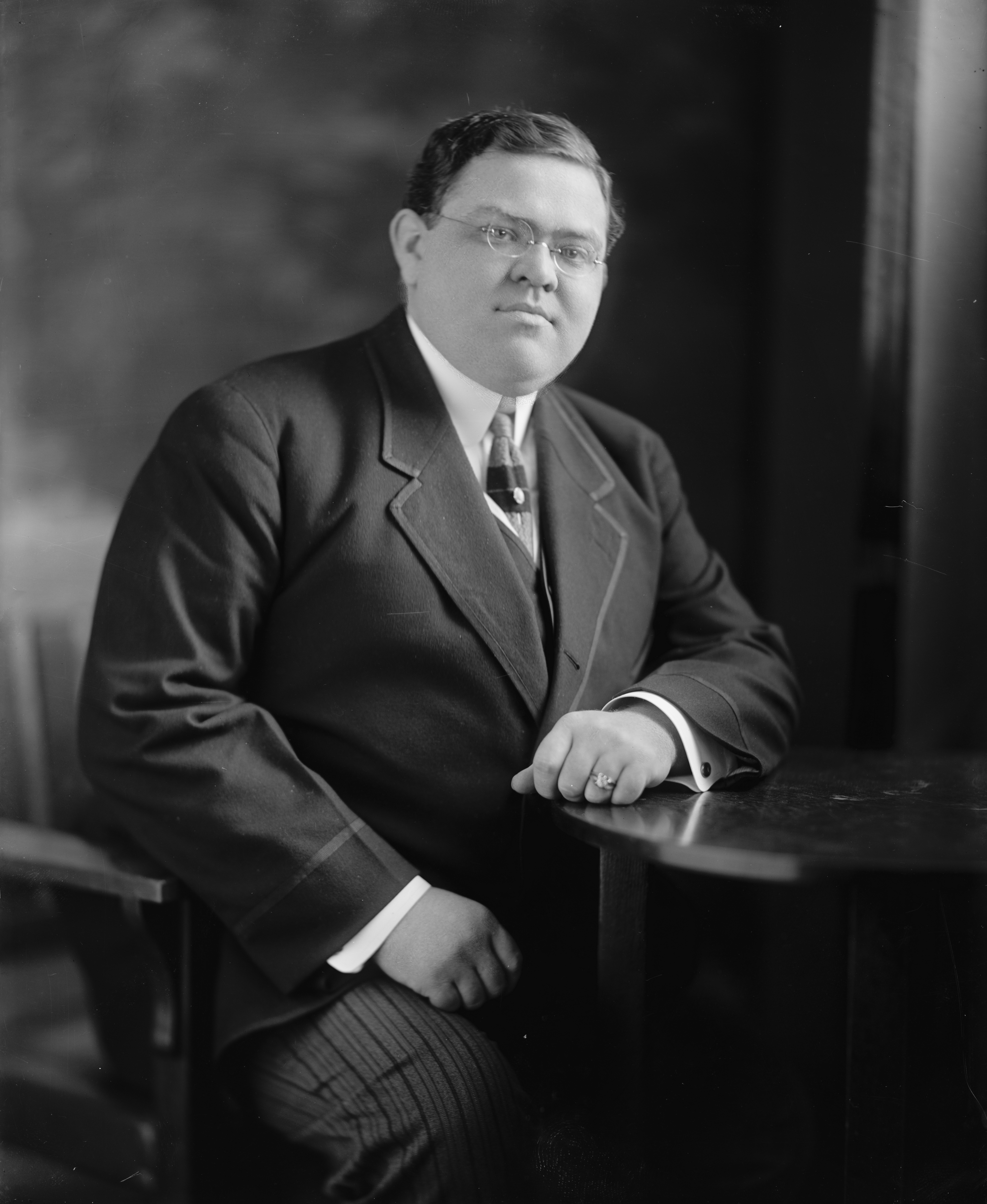
- Griffin, 1905–1926

Member of the U.S. House of Representatives from New York's 8th district
- In office March 4, 1913 – December 31, 1917
- Preceded by: Daniel J. Riordan
- Succeeded by: William E. Cleary

Personal details
- Born: Daniel Joseph Griffin; March 26, 1880 New York City, U.S.
- Died: December 11, 1926 (aged 46) New York City, U.S.
- Resting place: Holy Cross Cemetery
- Party: Democratic
- Education: St. Peter's College; New York Law School

Daniel Joseph Griffin (March 26, 1880 – December 11, 1926) was a lawyer and Democratic politician from New York. He was a U.S. representative from 1913 through 1917.

== Biography ==
He was born in Brooklyn, New York, attended parochial schools there, and then St. Laurent College near Montreal, Quebec, Canada, and St. Peter's College in Jersey City.

=== Legal career ===
Griffin graduated in law from the New York Law School. After he was admitted to the bar in 1902, he commenced practice in Brooklyn. Between 1903 and 1906, he also served as commissioner of licenses for the Borough of Brooklyn. After that he was head of the administration and guardianship departments of the Surrogate's Court of Kings County from 1906 to 1912.

=== Congress ===
He was a delegate to the 1912 Democratic National Convention, and was also the Democratic candidate for U.S. Representative from New York's 8th congressional district. He was elected, taking office in March 1913. He was re-elected in 1914 and 1916.

=== Law enforcement ===
In 1917, he was elected Sheriff of Kings County, New York. He resigned as Representative on 31 December to assume his new office the next day. He served as sheriff for two years. After leaving office he resumed the practice of law.

=== Death ===
He died in Brooklyn, New York, on December 11, 1926, and was interred in Holy Cross Cemetery, Brooklyn.

U.S. House of Representatives
Preceded by Daniel J. Riordan	Member of the U.S. House of Representatives from New York's 8th congressional district 1913–1917	Succeeded by William E. Cleary
