= McCleary =

McCleary is an Irish surname. It originated in Galway, Ireland, but the surname is primarily now found in Ulster and Scotland with many descendants in Ulster Scots and Irish areas of North America.

The name McCleary is derived from the Gaelic Mac Cléirigh which means Son of the Cleric (or Son of the Priest).

The earliest derivation of the name is possibly Mael Fabhaill mac Cleireach, ancestor of the Ó hEidhin/Hynes family of County Galway, fl. 800.

However, many surnames such as Clarke and MacTaggart also derive from son of the cleric or son of the priest. Orphans were often taken in by the local religious orders, and indeed priests fathered children before the adoption of celibacy, which may be the source of variations of this surname.

== List of persons with the surname ==
- Andrew McCleary (1863–1944), Canadian politician
- Boyd McCleary (born 1949), British diplomat, governor of the British Virgin Islands
- Brian Verdon McCleary (1897–1978), New Zealand rugby player
- Charles H. McCleary (1842–1906), American soldier
- Christopher R. McCleary (born 1956), American venture capitalist
- Ernie McCleary (1923–2012), Northern Irish footballer
- Garath McCleary (born 1987), Jamaican professional Association footballer
- George W. McCleary (1807–1873), American politician
- James McCleary (1853–1924), United States Representative from Minnesota
- Mary McCleary (born 1951), American artist
- Rachel McCleary, American academic
- Tracy McCleary (died 2003), American jazz band leader
- Trent McCleary (born 1972), Canadian former professional hockey player
- Urie McCleary (1905–1980), American art director and designer in Hollywood
- William McCleary (1853–1917), Canadian merchant and politician

== Places ==
- McCleary, Washington, United States
- McCleary Glacier, Antarctica

== See also ==
- James MacCleary, British politician
- McCleary Elementary School, Pittsburgh, Pennsylvania
- McCleery
- McClary
- Cleary (surname)
- Clary (disambiguation)
