= Senator Clary =

Senator Clary may refer to:

- Charlie Clary (born 1950), Florida State Senate
- Debbie Clary (born 1959), North Carolina State Senate

== See also ==
- Senator Cleary (disambiguation)
