= Robert McClellan (congressman) =

American politician (1806–1860)

Member of the U.S. House of Representatives from New York's 8th district
- In office March 4, 1841 – March 3, 1843
- Preceded by: Aaron Vanderpoel
- Succeeded by: Seat eliminated
- In office March 4, 1837 – March 3, 1839
- Preceded by: Aaron Vanderpoel
- Succeeded by: Aaron Vanderpoel

Personal details
- Born: October 2, 1806 Livingston, New York, U.S.
- Died: June 28, 1860 (aged 53) New York City, U.S.
- Resting place: Greenwood Cemetery
- Party: Democratic
- Education: Williams College
- Profession: Politician, lawyer

Robert McClellan (October 2, 1806 – June 28, 1860) was an American lawyer and politician who served two non-consecutive terms as a U.S. representative from New York from 1837 to 1839, and from 1841 to 1843.

== Biography ==
Born in Livingston, New York, McClellan graduated from Williams College, Williamstown, Massachusetts, in 1825. He studied law, was admitted to the bar and practiced his profession in Middleburgh, New York from 1828 to 1843. Among the prospective attorneys who studied in his office was Lyman Sanford.

=== Congress ===
McClellan was elected as a Democrat to the Twenty-fifth Congress (March 4, 1837 – March 3, 1839).

McClellan was elected to the Twenty-seventh Congress (March 4, 1841 – March 3, 1843).

He served as chairman of the Committee on Patents (Twenty-seventh Congress).

=== Death ===
He died in Greenpoint, Brooklyn, New York, June 28, 1860. He was interred in Greenwood Cemetery.

== Sources ==
- United States Congress. "Robert McClellan (id: M000333)". Biographical Directory of the United States Congress.

U.S. House of Representatives
Preceded by Aaron Vanderpoel	Member of the U.S. House of Representatives from New York's 8th congressional district 1837–1839	Succeeded by Aaron Vanderpoel
Preceded by Aaron Vanderpoel	Member of the U.S. House of Representatives from New York's 8th congressional district 1841–1843	Succeeded by seat eliminated
