= Michael Cleary =

Michael Cleary may refer to:

- Michael Cleary (rugby) (born 1940), Australian politician and dual-code rugby player
- Michael J. Cleary (1925–2020), Irish Roman Catholic bishop
- Michael Cleary (hurler) (born 1966), former Irish hurler for Nenagh Éire Óg and Tipperary
- Michael Cleary (priest) (1934–1993), Irish Roman Catholic priest
- Mike Cleary (1858–1893), Irish-American boxer
- Michael Cleary, Irish criminal who killed his wife Bridget Cleary in 1895
- M. J. Cleary (1877–1947), American politician
- Micheál Clery, Fianna Fáil TD 1927–1945
- Dr. Michael H. Cleary (1853–1933), American politician, physician, and lawyer

== See also ==
- Cleary (surname)
