= Valentine Efner =

American politician

Member of the U.S. House of Representatives from New York's 8th district
- In office March 4, 1835 – March 3, 1837
- Preceded by: John Adams
- Succeeded by: Zadock Pratt

Personal details
- Born: May 5, 1776 Blenheim, Province of New York, British America
- Died: November 20, 1865 (aged 89) Blenheim, New York, U.S.
- Resting place: Blenheim Hill Cemetery
- Party: Jacksonian
- Children: William Martin Efner, Ezekiel Taylor Efner, Elizabeth Efner McArthur, Catherine Efner Whiting, Margaret Wod Efner Cornell, Rebeca Efner
- Occupation: Farmer, politician, soldier

Military service
- Allegiance: United States
- Branch/service: United States Army
- Years of service: 1812–1815
- Rank: Lieutenant colonel
- Unit: 104th Regiment, New York Militia
- Battles/wars: Battle of Queenston Heights Battle of Plattsburgh

Valentine Efner (Also spelled Effner) (May 5, 1776 – November 20, 1865) was an American soldier, farmer, and congressmen who served the U.S. Representative from New York for one term from 1835 to 1837.

== Early life ==
Efner was born in Blenheim Hill to a German immigrant named Henderich Effner and his wife Margarieta Teator, near Blenheim, New York. He learned farming at an early age, preparing for a life of farming. Efner then completed preparatory studies and became a farmer. He decided to serve in local offices, including justice of the peace.

=== War of 1812 ===
Efner was a major in the New York Militia during the War of 1812. He served at notable battles like Queenston heights and Plattsburgh, eventually being promoted to the rank of lieutenant colonel and second in command of the militia's 104th Regiment.

=== Politics ===
He served as member of the New York State Assembly in 1829.

=== Congress ===
Efner was elected as a Jacksonian to the Twenty-fourth Congress (March 4, 1835 – March 3, 1837). During his term, Efner missed 203 out of 459 roll call votes, missing about 44.2%. This is way above the median of 21.0%, average for the time. He did not run for reelection in 1836, and decided to return to farming.

== Death ==
He died in Blenheim Hill on November 20, 1865, at the age of 89, and he is buried at Blenheim Hill Cemetery.

U.S. House of Representatives
Preceded by John Adams	Member of the U.S. House of Representatives from New York's 8th congressional district 1835–1837	Succeeded by Zadock Pratt
