= Owen Cleary =

American politician (1900–1961)

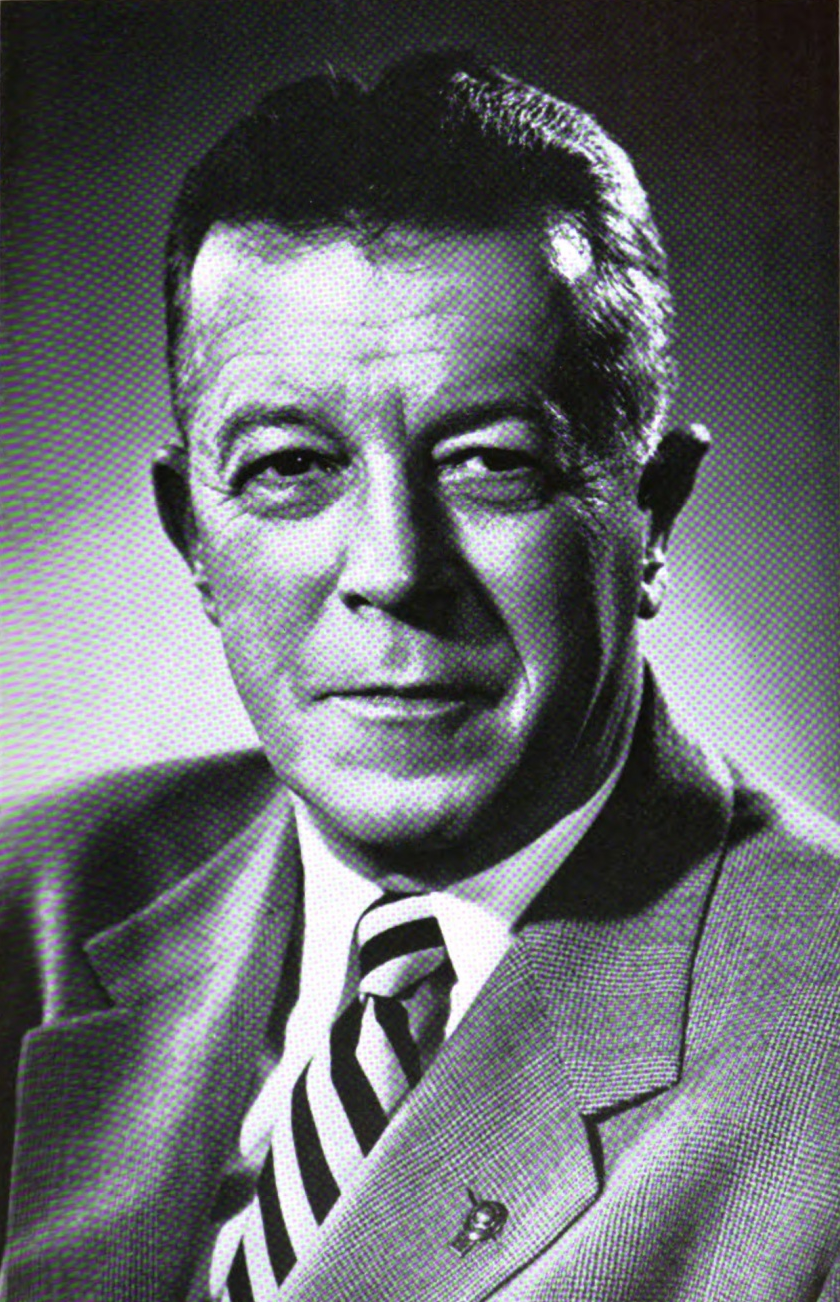
Owen Cleary c. 1955

Owen Jenks Cleary (February 4, 1900 – September 10, 1961) was a politician from the U.S. state of Michigan.

== Early life ==
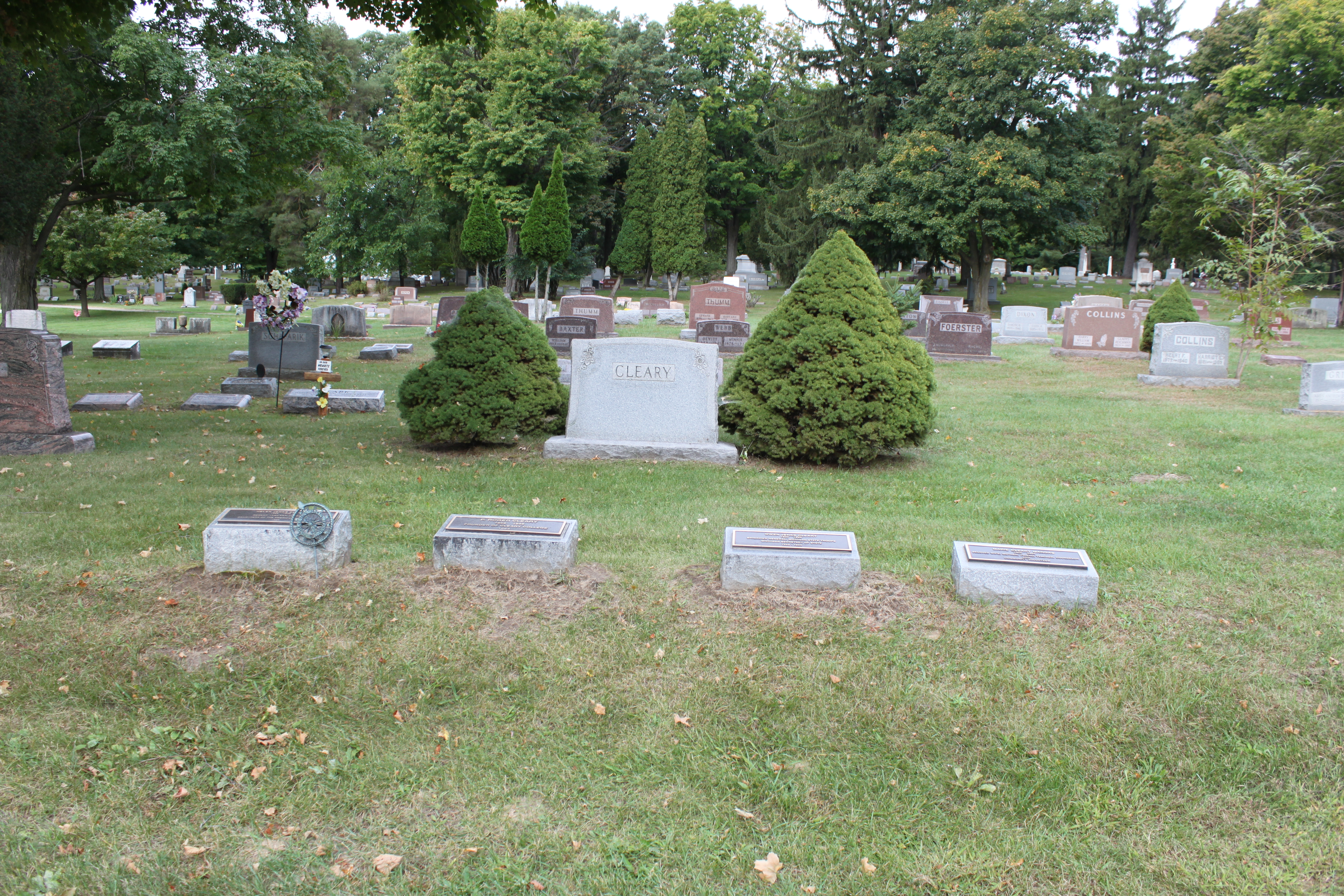
Cleary family grave plot. Cleary's grave (right of center) is next to his father's (left of center), the founder of Cleary College

Cleary was born in Ypsilanti, Washtenaw County, Michigan to Patrick Roger Cleary and Helen (Jenks) Cleary, and was married to Marie DeWaele. Cleary graduated from Cleary College, which had been founded by his father, and Owen Cleary eventually worked for the school. Owen Cleary served in the U.S. Army during World War I.

== Career ==
In 1938, he became president of Cleary University when his father retired. During World War II, the Governor of Michigan asked him to raise troops to replace the Michigan National Guard which had been called up to serve in the War and Cleary served as a brigadier general.

Cleary was also a lawyer and a candidate in the primary for Lieutenant Governor of Michigan in 1946. Cleary served as chair of the Michigan Republican Party from 1949 to 1953. He was a delegate to 1952 Republican National Convention and an alternate to the 1956 convention. He was also member of Republican National Committee from 1952 to 1953.

Cleary was Michigan Secretary of State from 1953 to 1954 and defeated in 1954. He was candidate in the primary for Governor of Michigan in 1954 and was the last Republican to serve as Secretary of State until Candice Miller took office on January 1, 1995.

== Personal life ==
Cleary was a Congregationalist and a member of the American Bar Association, American Legion, Moose, Rotary, Delta Theta Phi, Phi Delta Phi and Phi Kappa Sigma. Cleary is interred at Highland Cemetery, Ypsilanti, Michigan.

Party political offices
| Preceded by Frederick M. Alger Jr. | Republican nominee for Michigan Secretary of State; 1952, 1954 | Succeeded by John B. Martin Jr. |
| Preceded by John A. Wagner | Chairman of the Michigan Republican Party; 1949– 1953 | Succeeded by John Feikens |
Political offices
| Preceded by Fred M. Alger, Jr. | Michigan Secretary of State; 1953– 1954 | Succeeded by James M. Hare |
