= Jimmy Bermingham =

Irish association footballer

Jimmy Bermingham was an Irish footballer who played as forward during the 1920s and 1930s.

Bermingham was an outside right during this era in the League of Ireland and was part of the Bohemians team of 1927/28 who won every trophy on offer that season – League of Ireland, FAI Cup, Shield and Leinster Senior Cup. He was top scorer for Bohs the previous season with 23 goals in all competitions

He won 1 full international cap for Irish Free State, making his debut against Belgium in 1929 at Dalymount Park.

== Honours ==
Bohemians

- League of Ireland: 1927–28, 1929–30
- FAI Cup: 1928
- League of Ireland Shield: 1928, 1929
- Aciéries d'Angleur Trophy: 1929
