= Patrick J. Carley =

American politician

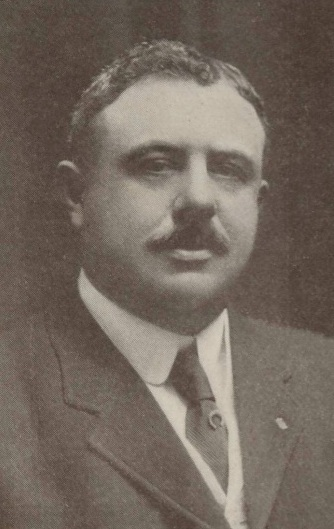

Chairman of the House Committee on the Election of the President, Vice President, and Representatives
- In office 1932–1933

Member of the U.S. House of Representatives from New York's 8th district
- In office March 4, 1927 – January 3, 1935
- Preceded by: William E. Cleary
- Succeeded by: Richard J. Tonry

Personal details
- Born: February 2, 1866 County Roscommon, Ireland, U.K.
- Died: February 25, 1936 (aged 70) Brooklyn, New York, U.S.
- Other political affiliations: Democratic
- Occupation: construction, real estate development

Patrick John Carley (February 2, 1866 – February 25, 1936) was an Irish-American businessman and politician who served four terms, from 1927 to 1935, as a U.S. representative from New York.

== Life and career ==
P. J. Carley was born in 1866 in County Roscommon, Ireland (then a part of the U.K.). He was educated in Ireland and immigrated to the United States when he was 17, settling in Brooklyn, New York. He became active in construction and real estate development, eventually owning and operating his own firm, P. J. Carley & Sons. He was also involved in banking and several civic causes, including support of the Bay Ridge Memorial Hospital.

=== Tenure in Congress ===
In 1926 Carley was elected as a Democrat to the Seventieth Congress. He was reelected three times, and served from March 4, 1927, to January 3, 1935. From 1932 to 1933 he was Chairman of the House Committee on the Election of the President, Vice President, and Representatives.

=== Later career and death ===
Carley was not a candidate for renomination in 1934 and resumed his construction and other business interests.

== Death and burial ==
Carley died in Brooklyn on February 25, 1936, and was buried in Calvary Cemetery in Queens, New York.

== External resources ==
- United States Congress. "Patrick J. Carley (id: C000149)". Biographical Directory of the United States Congress.
- Patrick J. Carley at Political Graveyard

U.S. House of Representatives
Preceded by William E. Cleary	Member of the U.S. House of Representatives from New York's 8th congressional district 1927–1935	Succeeded by Richard J. Tonry
