= John A. Wagner =

American politician from Michigan

John A. Wagner (May 26, 1885 - December 8, 1964) was a politician from the U.S. state of Michigan.

== Early life ==
On May 26, 1885, Wagner was born in Le Roy Township, Calhoun County, Michigan. Wagner's grandfather was John Wagner, an early settler. Wagner's father was Frank N. Wagner. Wagner's mother was Aylett Amanda (nee Addington) Wagner. In 1905, Wagner graduated from Battle Creek high school.

== Education ==
Wagner earned a Bachelor of Laws from University of Michigan.

== Career ==
Wagner practiced law in Battle Creek, Michigan.

Wagner was Chair of the Michigan Republican Party from 1945 to 1949 and a delegate to the 1948 Republican National Convention.

== Personal life ==
On June 29, 1909, Wagner married Alice M. Goucher. They had one child, Alice Belden Wagner (b.1911). Wagner and his family lived in Battle Creek, Michigan.

Party political offices
Preceded by John R. Dethmers	Chairman of the Michigan Republican Party; 1945– 1949	Succeeded by Owen Cleary
