= Robert Clark (New York politician) =

American politician

Member of the U.S. House of Representatives from New York's 8th district
- In office March 4, 1819 – March 3, 1821
- Preceded by: Dorrance Kirtland
- Succeeded by: Richard McCarty

Personal details
- Born: June 12, 1777 Washington County, New York
- Died: October 1, 1837 (aged 60) Monroe, Michigan
- Party: Democratic-Republican
- Spouse: Catherine Reid
- Profession: Politician

Robert Clark (June 12, 1777 – October 1, 1837) was a medical doctor and politician. He served in the New York State Assembly and one term as United States Representative from New York. With his family, he moved to Monroe, Michigan in 1823, joining the migration west. He did not run again for office.

== Early life and education ==
Robert Clark was born in Washington County, New York, six months after his family emigrated from the Scottish Lowlands. His father died when he was age thirteen. He was tutored privately and then studied medicine in the office of his older brother, Thomas Clark. He commenced a medical practice in Galway, New York in 1799.

== Career ==
That same year, at age 22 Clark married Catherine Reid, who was barely 15. Although his mother-in-law offered to help establish them in Lachine, Quebec, Canada, his wife's former home, Clark refused to settle in the dominions of the British Crown.

Clark and Catherine remained in Galway; he built a house where their first two children were born. After the house burned to the ground, Clark and his family lived in temporary shelter provided by neighbors, where his third child was born. They soon afterward moved to Stamford, New York, and later settled near Delhi, where he continued the practice of his profession.

== Political career ==
Before the War of 1812, Clark entered politics. He was elected as a member of the New York State Assembly (Delaware Co.) in 1812 and 1814–1815. A few years later, he was elected as a Democratic-Republican to the 16th United States Congress, holding office from March 4, 1819, to March 3, 1821. He was a delegate to the New York State Constitutional Convention of 1821.

In New York, he was a Free and Accepted Mason. He was a Presbyterian, and when living in New York was a member and ruling elder of the Scotch Church.

== Move to Michigan ==
In 1823, Clark and his family joined the migration west, moving to Monroe County, Michigan, and settling in the village of Monroe. He was not in harmony or fellowship with the Masonic lodge of Monroe. His wife, with their eight children, the youngest age 22 months, followed him from New York as soon as convenient. The couple had a total of thirteen children together, ten of whom grew to maturity.

From 1823 to 1831, he served as Register of the Land Office, an appointed office, for the 2nd Land District of Michigan Territory. The family at first lived in a small house in the village. Clark soon purchased a farm at the edge of the village, which had once been part of a French-Canadian estate. When the land office was moved to White Pigeon, Clark returned to the practice of medicine. He also became involved in the scientific cultivation of fruits and grasses and the subject of drainage.

Concerning his political affiliations, Clark used to say "that he had never changed his principles, but found himself a member of the Whig Party without needing to change" (Wing p. 146). After a long and painful illness, Clark died on a Sabbath morning in Monroe, Michigan.

Clark's wife survived him by 22 years.

U.S. House of Representatives
Preceded by Dorrance Kirtland	Member of the U.S. House of Representatives from New York's 8th congressional district 1819–1821	Succeeded by Richard McCarty
