= Charles G. Bond =

American politician

Charles Grosvenor Bond
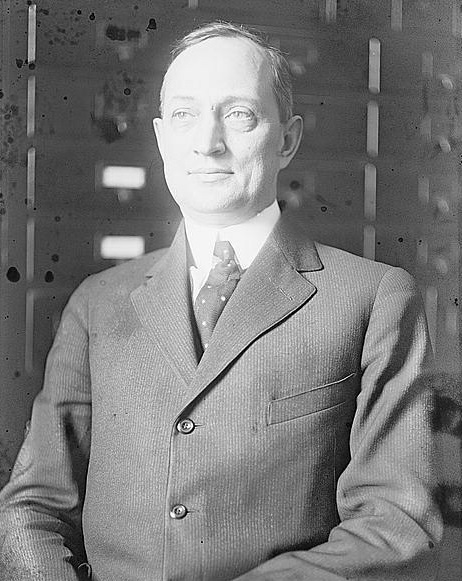

Member of the U.S. House of Representatives from New York's 8th district
- In office March 4, 1921 – March 3, 1923
- Preceded by: William E. Cleary
- Succeeded by: William E. Cleary

Personal details
- Born: May 29, 1877 Columbus, Ohio, U.S.
- Died: January 8, 1974 (aged 96) Bound Brook, New Jersey, U.S.
- Citizenship: United States
- Party: Republican
- Spouse: Bertha Gildersleeve Paterson Bond
- Education: Ohio State University
- Profession: Attorney; politician

Charles Grosvenor Bond (May 29, 1877 – January 8, 1974) was a Republican United States representative from the state of New York who served in the 67th United States Congress.

== Biography ==
Bond, a nephew of American Civil War general Charles H. Grosvenor, was born in Columbus, Ohio, the son of William W. and Frances (Currier) Bond. He attended public school, graduated from the law department of Ohio State University at Columbus in 1899, and was admitted to the bar the same year, commencing the practice of law in Columbus, Ohio. He moved to New York City in 1903 and continued to practice his profession. He married Bertha Gildersleeve Paterson on June 27, 1905.

== Career ==
Elected as a Republican, Bond served one term as U. S. Representative from New York's eighth district in the Sixty-seventh United States Congress from March 4, 1921, to March 3, 1923.

Defeated in 1922, Bond resumed the practice of law and made an unsuccessful bid for the borough presidency of Brooklyn in 1926. He was the attorney for writer O. Henry, and was a delegate to the Republican National Convention from New York in 1936. Bond served as chairman of the Alcohol Beverage Control Board of New York City from 1934 to 1970 when he retired at 93 years of age.

== Death ==
Bond died in Bound Brook, New Jersey, on January 8, 1974 (age 96 years, 224 days). He was cremated and his ashes are interred at West Union Street Cemetery, Athens, Ohio. His granddaughter, Geraldine Bond Laybourne, founded the Oxygen Network after leading Nickelodeon's huge growth in the 1970s and '80s.

U.S. House of Representatives
Preceded by William E. Cleary	Member of the U.S. House of Representatives from New York's 8th congressional district March 4, 1921 – March 3, 1923	Succeeded by William E. Cleary
