= Richard McCarty (politician) =

American politician

Member of the U.S. House of Representatives from New York's 8th district
- In office March 4, 1821 – March 3, 1823
- Preceded by: Robert Clark
- Succeeded by: James Strong

Personal details
- Born: February 19, 1780 Coeymans, New York
- Died: May 18, 1844 (aged 64) New York City
- Party: Democratic-Republican

Richard McCarty (February 19, 1780 – May 18, 1844) was an American politician from New York.

== Life ==
He was the son of Gen. David McCarty (1737–1812; assemblyman in 1792) and Charlotte (Coeymans) McCarty (1746–1828). He was born in that part of Watervliet, New York which was separated in 1791 as the Town of Coeymans. There he attended the common schools.

He was County Clerk of Greene County from 1811 to 1813, and from 1821 to 1822.

McCarty was elected as a Democratic-Republican to the 17th United States Congress, holding office from December 3, 1821, to March 3, 1823. He was President of the Lafayette Bank in New York City and was one of the committee appointed to receive General Lafayette when he visited the United States in 1824 and 1825.

McCarty died in New York City and was buried at the Adams Cemetery in Coxsackie.

State Senator John McCarty (1782–1851) was his brother.

U.S. House of Representatives
Preceded by Robert Clark	Member of the U.S. House of Representatives from New York's 8th congressional district 1821–1823	Succeeded by James Strong
