= James Strong (New York politician) =

American politician (1783–1847)

Member of the U.S. House of Representatives from New York
- In office March 4, 1819 – March 3, 1821
- Preceded by: Philip J. Schuyler
- Succeeded by: Walter Patterson
- Constituency: 5th district
- In office March 4, 1823 – March 3, 1831
- Preceded by: Richard McCarty
- Succeeded by: John King
- Constituency: 8th district

Personal details
- Born: October 6, 1783 Windham, Connecticut, USA
- Died: August 8, 1847 (aged 63) Chester, New Jersey, USA
- Party: Federalist, Adams-Clay Federalist, Adams, Anti-Jacksonian
- Profession: Attorney

James Strong (October 6, 1783 – August 8, 1847) was a United States representative from New York.

== Biography ==
Strong was born in Windham, Connecticut on October 6, 1783. In 1806 he graduated from the University of Vermont in Burlington, Vermont, afterwards moving to Hudson, New York.

Strong studied law, became an attorney in 1810, and practiced in Hudson. He served in local offices, including member of the Columbia County Board of Supervisors, alderman for the city of Hudson, and the judicial position of master in chancery. He also served in the New York Militia as judge advocate of the 12th Brigade.

He was elected as Federalist to the 16th United States Congress (March 4, 1819 – March 3, 1821).

He was elected as an Adams-Clay Federalist to the 18th United States Congress, reelected as an Adams candidate to the 19th and 20th United States Congress, and reelected as an Anti-Jacksonian to the 21st United States Congress (March 4, 1823 – March 3, 1831). Strong was chairman of the Committee on Territories in the 19th and 20th Congresses.

In 1824 Strong received the honorary degree of Master of Arts from the University of Vermont. He later relocated to New York City, and he died in Chester, New Jersey on August 8, 1847. Strong never married and had no children.

U.S. House of Representatives
Preceded by Philip J. Schuyler	Member of the U.S. House of Representatives from New York's 5th congressional district 1819–1821	Succeeded by Walter Patterson
Preceded by Richard McCarty	Member of the U.S. House of Representatives from New York's 8th congressional district 1823–1831	Succeeded by John King
