= John M. Cleary =

American lawyer, judge and politician (1869–1948)

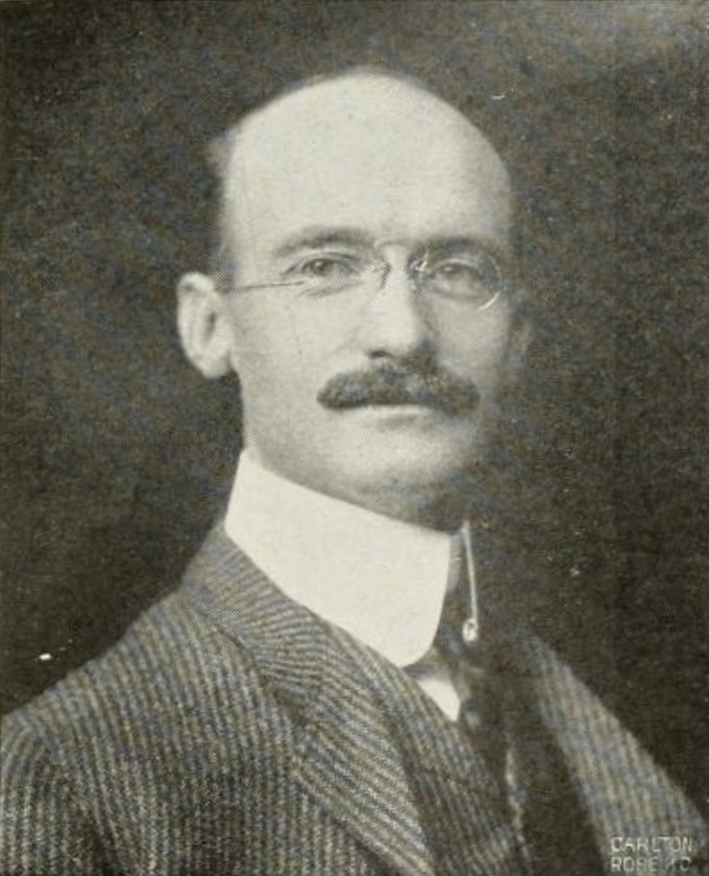
- Cleary (c. 1902)

Member of the Missouri House of Representatives
- In office 1898

Personal details
- Born: August 21, 1869 near Odell, Illinois, U.S.
- Died: December 28, 1948 (aged 79) Kansas City, Missouri, U.S.
- Party: Democratic
- Spouse: Mollie O'Rourke (m. 1902)
- Children: 1
- Education: Illinois Wesleyan University
- Occupation: Lawyer; politician; judge

John M. Cleary (August 21, 1869 – December 28, 1948) was a lawyer, judge and state politician from Missouri.

== Early life ==
John M. Cleary was born on August 21, 1869, near Odell, Illinois. He grew up on a farm, received his early education in district schools and at Odell High School. He attended Illinois State Normal School at Dixon and took a literary course at St. Victeur College in Kankakee, Illinois. He then studied law at Illinois Wesleyan University; graduating in 1893.

== Career ==
Cleary joined Stevenson & Ewing. Adlai Stevenson encouraged Cleary to join him in Washington, D.C., but Cleary declined. In 1894, Cleary moved to Kansas City, Missouri. Cleary was a Democrat. He was elected to the Missouri House of Representatives, representing the 4th District, in 1898. Cleary supported organized labor legislation and was credited with the state barber inspection law.

Cleary continued his law practice after his term expired. Cleary was appointed by Governor Lloyd C. Stark in 1938 to replace Daniel Bird as judge of the Jackson County Circuit Court. He was defeated for election as judge in 1940 to Paul A. Buzard. He became law partners with his son on October 1, 1947.

== Personal life ==
Cleary married Mollie O'Rourke on June 30, 1902. They had one son, John M. Cleary Jr.

Cleary died on December 28, 1948, at his home on 6028 Cherry Street in Kansas City.
