= Cleary, Missouri =

Extinct hamlet in Missouri, U.S.

Coordinates: 39°44′36″N 93°31′54″W

Cleary is an extinct town in Livingston County, in the U.S. state of Missouri. The GNIS classifies it as a populated place.

A post office called Cleary was established in 1845, and remained in operation until 1901. The community possibly derives its name from J. I. McCleery, the proprietor of a local mill.
