= John Cleary =

John Cleary may refer to:

- John Cleary (Canadian politician) (1932–2012), Ontario state politician
- John Cleary (Gaelic footballer) (born 1963), Irish footballer
- John Cleary (New South Wales politician) (1883–1962), Australian politician
- John Cleary (rugby), Australian rugby player
- John G. Cleary (1950–2014), New Zealand-Canadian computer scientist
- John Henry Cleary (1854–1937), Australian politician from Tasmania
- John M. Cleary (1869–1948), American lawyer, judge and politician
- Thomas John Cleary (born 1947), known as John, Australian politician from Tasmania
- John Cleary (actor) from List of Australian films of 1974
- John Cleary (Rockland County, NY) in 104th New York State Legislature

== See also ==
- Jon Cleary (1917–2010), Australian writer
- Jon Cleary (musician) (born 1962), American funk musician
