= Clary (surname) =

Clary is a surname. Notable people with the surname include:

- Charles Clary (1873–1931), American silent film actor
- Charlie Clary (born 1950), American politician from Florida
- David Clary (born 1953), British theoretical chemist, college president, and scientific advisor
- Debbie Clary (born 1959), American politician from North Carolina
- Désirée Clary (1777–1860), Queen of Sweden and Norway
- Don Clary (born 1957), American long-distance runner
- Ed Clary (1916–2005), American football player
- Edward Alvin Clary (1883–1939), US Navy sailor and Medal of Honor recipient
- Ellis Clary (1916–2000), American baseball player, coach and scout
- François Clary (1725–1794), French merchant, father of Désirée and Julie
- Gary Clary (born 1948), American politician
- Jeromey Clary (born 1983), American football player
- Johnny Lee Clary (1959–2014), Ku Klux Klan leader who became an anti-racism preacher
- Joseph M. Clary (1905–1996), American philatelist
- Julian Clary (born 1959), English comedian and novelist
- Julie Clary (1771–1845), spouse of Joseph Bonaparte, Napoleon I's brother
- Robert Clary (1926–2022), American actor, author, and lecturer
- Robert E. Clary (1805–1890), US Army officer
- Tyler Clary (born 1989), American swimmer

== See also ==
- Reginald Clarry (1882–1945), British politician
- Clarey, similar surname
- McClary, another surname
