= William E. Cleary =

American politician

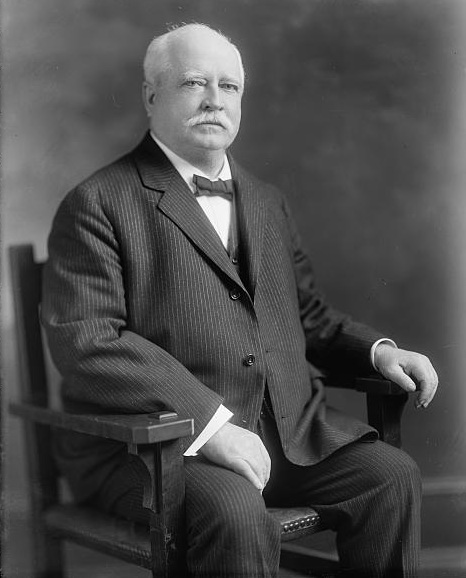

Member of the U.S. House of Representatives from New York's 8th district
- In office March 4, 1923 – March 3, 1927
- Preceded by: Charles G. Bond
- Succeeded by: Patrick J. Carley
- In office March 5, 1918 – March 3, 1921
- Preceded by: Daniel J. Griffin
- Succeeded by: Charles G. Bond

Personal details
- Born: July 20, 1849 Ellenville, New York, US
- Died: December 20, 1932 (aged 83) Brooklyn, New York, US
- Party: Democratic

William Edward Cleary (July 20, 1849 – December 20, 1932) was an American businessman and politician who served four terms as a U.S. representative from New York from 1918 to 1921, and from 1923 to 1927.

== Biography ==
Born in Ellenville, New York, Cleary attended the public schools and the Ellenville Academy. He moved to Brooklyn in 1879 and engaged in water transportation. He served as vice president of the New York Board of Trade and Transportation. He was a founder, and served as president, of the Victory Memorial Hospital.

=== Tenure in Congress ===
Cleary was elected as a Democrat to the Sixty-fifth Congress to fill the vacancy caused by the resignation of Daniel J. Griffin. He was reelected to the Sixty-sixth Congress and served from March 5, 1918, to March 3, 1921. He was an unsuccessful candidate for reelection in 1920 to the Sixty-seventh Congress.

Cleary was elected to the Sixty-eighth and Sixty-ninth Congresses (March 4, 1923 – March 3, 1927). He was not a candidate for reelection in 1926.

=== Later career and death ===
He resumed his former business interests. He died in Brooklyn, New York, December 20, 1932. He was interred in Holy Cross Cemetery in Brooklyn.

=== Family legacy ===
His grandson Stephen Edward Smith was a brother-in-law and campaign manager for President John F. Kennedy.

U.S. House of Representatives
| Preceded by Daniel J. Griffin | Member of the U.S. House of Representatives from New York's 8th congressional district 1918 - 1921 | Succeeded by Charles G. Bond |
| Preceded by Charles G. Bond | Member of the U.S. House of Representatives from New York's 8th congressional district 1923 - 1927 | Succeeded by Patrick J. Carley |
