= Richard J. Tonry =

American politician

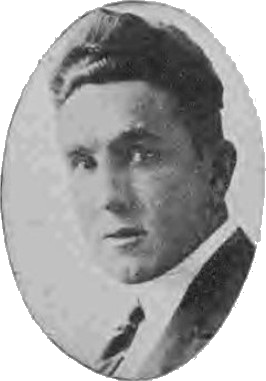
- Tonry in 1922

Member of the New York State Assembly from the 9th district
- In office 1922–1929
- Preceded by: James T. Carroll
- Succeeded by: Daniel McNamara

Member of the U.S. House of Representatives from New York's 8th district
- In office January 3, 1935 – January 3, 1937
- Preceded by: Patrick J. Carley
- Succeeded by: Donald O'Toole

Personal details
- Born: Richard Joseph Tonry; September 30, 1893 Brooklyn, New York, U.S.
- Died: January 17, 1971 (aged 77) Brooklyn, New York, U.S.
- Resting place: Long Island National Cemetery
- Party: Democratic
- Spouse: Josephine Hempstreet

Richard Joseph Tonry (September 30, 1893 – January 17, 1971) was an American politician from New York.

== Life ==
Born in Brooklyn, Tonry was educated in the public schools and attended Erasmus Hall High School. He then attended the Randolph Military Academy (in Montclair, New Jersey) and the Pratt Institute in Brooklyn. Tonry served as a corporal in the United States Marine Corps Reserve from 1917 to 1921, temporarily serving as a sergeant during World War I. Originally engaged in the steamship business, he later became engaged in the real estate and the insurance brokerage business.

He was a member of the New York State Assembly (Kings Co., 9th D.) in 1922, 1923, 1924, 1925, 1926, 1927, 1928 and 1929 and a member of the New York City Board of Aldermen from 1930 to 1934.

Tonry was elected as a Democrat to the 74th United States Congress, holding office from January 3, 1935, to January 3, 1937. He was a delegate to the Democratic State conventions in 1938, 1940, 1942, and 1946. He was Journal Clerk of the U.S. House of Representatives from 1943 to 1946.

In 1947, he was appointed as a commissioner of appraisal for the Corporation Counsel of New York City.

Tonry was married to Josephine Hempstreet, who died in 1953. He was a real estate and insurance broker and, in 1971, died at his home in Bay Ridge, Brooklyn. Tonry was buried at Long Island National Cemetery.

New York State Assembly
Preceded by James T. Carroll	New York State Assembly; Kings County, 9th District; 1922–1929	Succeeded by Daniel McNamara
U.S. House of Representatives
Preceded by Patrick J. Carley	Member of the U.S. House of Representatives from New York's 8th congressional district 1935–1937	Succeeded by Donald O'Toole
