= Brian P. Cleary =

American poet (born 1959)

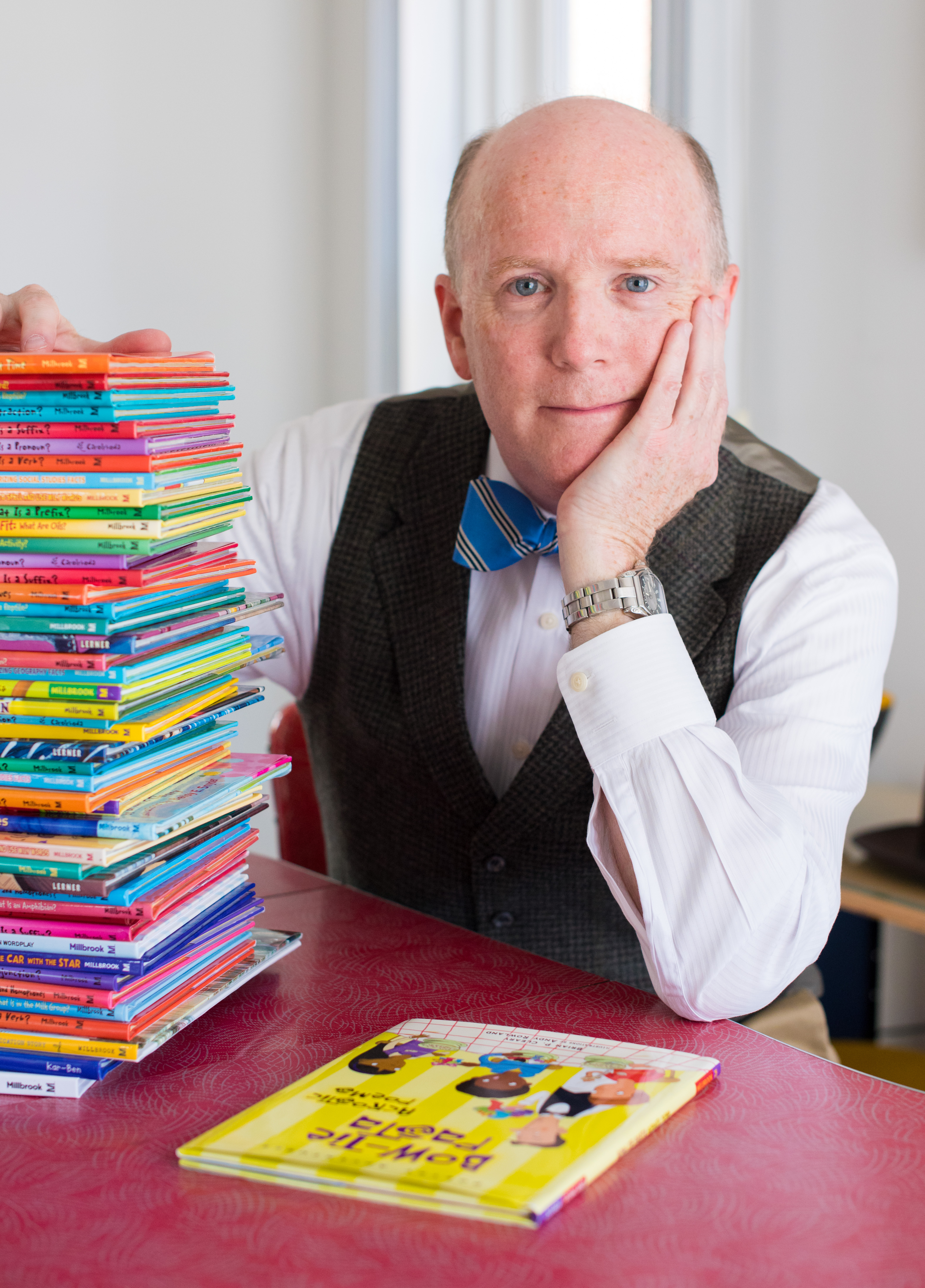
Brian P. Cleary in 2016

Brian P. Cleary (born October 1, 1959) is an American humorist, poet, and author. He is best known for his books written for grade-school children that explore grammar in humorous ways; he also controls a line of gift books for grownups. He is the senior editor for digital content at American Greetings, and his greetings have been performed by Dolly Parton, Christina Aguilera, Smokey Robinson, William Shatner, Meghan Trainor and others.

== Early life, education and career ==
Cleary was born in Lakewood, Ohio, one of nine children. He attended elementary school in three different states (Kansas, Minnesota and Ohio), and graduated from Saint Ignatius High School, a Jesuit boys-only Jesuit high school in Cleveland, Ohio. He graduated from John Carroll University with a degree in communications in 1982.

Since 1982, he has worked for American Greetings Corporation—one of the largest creative divisions in the world—where he is currently the senior editor, working on greeting cards, songs, and electronic greetings. He has toured more than 500 elementary schools in the U.S. and Europe as a visiting author making presentations to students and staff.

== Writing ==
Cleary created the best-selling "Words are CATegorical" series for grade school readers, a 27-volume set with more than 3 million copies in print published by Lerner Publishing Group. Kirkus Reviews praised his book on Adjectives, as, "Neat, clever, commnendable, and groovy." " He has also written humor essays for national and local magazines and newspapers. His cartoon writings have been published in more than 600 newspapers worldwide. His poetry has been anthologized alongside Jack Prelutsky, Kenn Nesbitt, and Lemony Snicket in a collection tilted "One Minute Till Bedtime," published by Little, Brown Books, 2016.

Cleary's literary influences include Ogden Nash, Shel Silverstein, and E.E. Cummings.

== Awards ==
- International Reading Association/Children's Book Council Children's Choice Award
- American Booksellers Association Kids' Pick of the List
- Benjamin Franklin Award (First Place)
- Society of School Librarians International Book Awards, Honor Book

== Bibliography ==
All of Cleary's children's books have been published by Lerner Publishing Group and are written for grades K-6.

=== "Words are CATegorical" series ===
Cleary's best-selling "Words are CATegorical" series includes 27 titles, published from 1999 to 2015.

=== "Sounds Like Reading" series ===
This is an 8-book series written for 1st graders and "English as second language" students, published in 2009.

- The Bug in the Jug Wants a Hug
- Stop, Drop, and Flop in the Slop
- The Nice Mice in the Rice
- The Frail Snail on the Trail
- The Thing on the Wing Can Sing
- Whose Shoes Would You Choose?
- The Peaches on the Beaches
- The Clown in the Gown Drives the Car with the Star

=== "Math is CATegorical" series ===
This is a 7-book series that introduces math concepts to 3rd graders.

- The Action of Subtraction
- The Mission of Addition
- How Long or How Wide? A Measuring Guide
- On the Scale, A Weighty Tale
- Windows, Rings, and Grapes: A Look at Different Shapes
- A Fraction's Goal: Parts of a Whole
- A-B-A-B-A: A Book of Pattern Play

=== Work appearing in poetry anthology ===
- One Minute Till Bedtime (Little, Brown 2016)

=== Other Lerner book titles ===
- Eight Wild Nights: A Family Hanukkah Tale (Carolrhoda Picture Books series)
- Peanut Butter and Jellyfishes: A Very Silly Alphabet Book (Millbrook Picture Books series)
- "Mrs. Riley Bought Five Itchy Aardvarks" and Other Painless Tricks for Memorizing Science Facts (Adventures in Memory series)
- Rainbow Soup: Adventures in Poetry
- The Laugh Stand: Adventures in Humor
- Rhyme & PUNishment: Adventures in Wordplay
- The Punctuation Station
- Six Sheep Sip Thick Shakes: And Other Tricky Tongue Twisters
- The Sun Played Hide-and-Seek: A Personification Story

=== Books for adults ===
- You Oughta Know by Now (Perseus 2010)
- 100 Things Worse Than Divorce: A Fun Reminder That Things Aren't as Bad as They Could Be (Fab-u-List Series 2021)
- 100 Ways Your Life Could Actually be Worse: A Fun Reminder That Things Aren't as Bad as They Could Be (Fab-u-List Series 2021)
- 100 Things You Should Know by the Time You're 40: Funny, Quirky, Pithy Bits of Wit and Wisdom (Fab-u-List Series 2021)
- 100 Things You Should Know by the Time You're 50: Funny, Quirky, Pithy Bits of Wit and Wisdom (Fab-u-List Series 2021)
- 100 Things You Should Know by the Time You're 60: Funny, Quirky, Pithy Bits of Wit and Wisdom (Fab-u-List Series 2022)
- 100 Signs You Might be Irish: Observations, Wit & Wisdom About the Ways of the Irish (Fab-u-List Series 2021)
- 100 Reasons Cats Are Better Than People: Scientifically Questionable Examples of Feline Superiority Over Humans (Fab-u-List Series 2022)
- 100 Reasons to Hang in There: A LightHearted, Encouraging Look at What Makes Life Worth Living (Fab-u-List Series 2022)
