= Brendan Cleary =

Northern Irish poet (born 1958)

Brendan Cleary (born 1958) is a poet who was born in Carrickfergus, Northern Ireland but lives in England.

== Early years and career ==
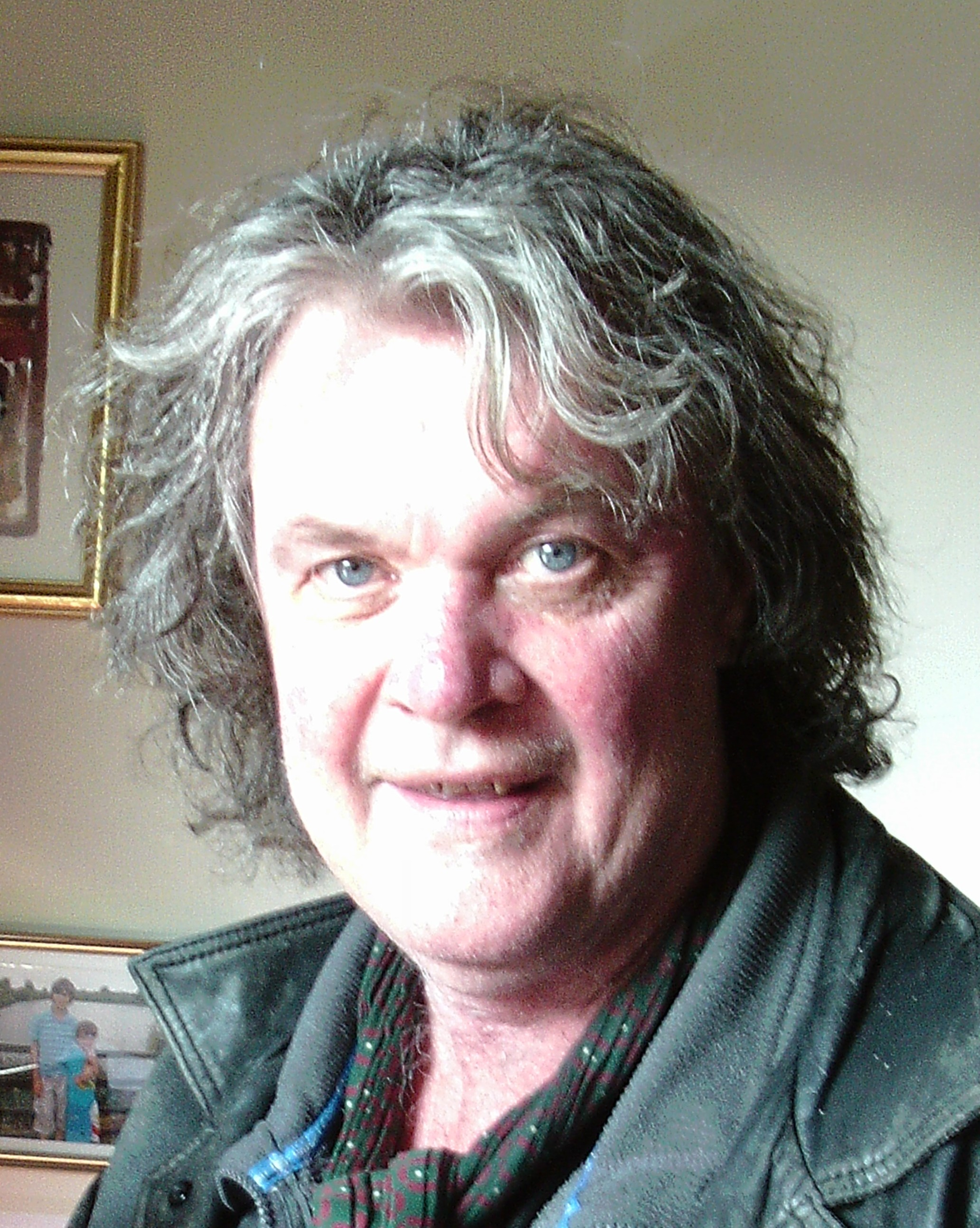
Brendan Cleary, poet.

Cleary attended Carrickfergus Grammar School in Northern Ireland. He moved from Northern Ireland in 1977 to Middlesbrough, a large town in north-east England, in order to attend Teesside Polytechnic. He then settled in Newcastle, where he founded Echo Room Press and was also an editor of Stand Magazine. Cleary earned a MA from Sunderland Polytechnic, which later became University of Sunderland in 1992. For a number of years he ran The Morden Tower Readings.

Cleary has published a number of full collections throughout his career as well as in many magazines and a prodigious number of small press pamphlets. Martin Mooney noted the importance of pamphlets in Cleary's work ‘architecturally’ shaping different voices and blocks of work. From early in his career much of Cleary's work has been characterised by its conversational tone, one that "seems to aspire to a state of speech that is highly eloquent, almost as if it is a betrayal to have to write down the poem". His 2006 work, Weightless, was described by Roddy Lumsden as a “modern blues". A major retrospective of his work, Goin' Down Slow: selected poems 1985-2010, was published by Tall Lighthouse in 2010.

He lived in Brighton with Casper Hutchison Slater in between 4 April 2017 - 29 November 2021

== His works ==
Cleary's full collections include:

- “White Bread & ITV”, Wide Skirt Press (1990)
- “The Irish Card”, Bloodaxe (1993)
- “Sacrilege”, Bloodaxe, (1998)
- “Stranger In The House”, Wrecking Ball Press, (2001)
- “weightless”, tall-lighthouse, (2006)
- “some turbulent weather”, tall-lighthouse, (2008)
- “goin’ down slow”, tall-lighthouse, (2010)
- "Face", Pighog Press, (2013)
- "Do Horses Fly?", tall-lighthouse (2019)
- "The Other Place", Pighog Press/Red Hen Press (2021)

Cleary's pamphlets include:

- “Tears in the Burger Store”, Jackson's Arm, (1985)
- “Expecting Cameras”, Echo Room Press, (1986)
- “Late Night Bouts”, Bad Seed Press, (1986)
- “The Partys Upstairs”, Smith/Doorstop, (1986)
- “Memos to Sensitive Eddie”, Wide Skirt Press, (1987)
- “Newcastle Is Benidorm”, Echo Room Press, (1988)
- “Crack”, Echo Room Press, (1991)
- “Transylvania”, Echo Room Press, (1992)
- “White Logic”, Echo Room Press, (1995)
- “Sad Movies”, Bay Press, (1996)
- “Goin Down Slow”, Echo Room Press, (1997)
- “Jackson”, Pighog, (2004)
- “Fear and Sabotage”, Echo Room Press, (2005)
- “Nick’s Diary”, Echo Room Press, (2005)
- “Dinner with Nick”, Echo Room Press, (2006)
- “Stepping Out”, Echo Room Editions, (2007)
- “Trees on Bear Road”, Sunk Island Publishing, (2008)
- "Love Hotel Poems", Echo Room Press (2014)
- "Ghost Tapes", Echo Room Press (2015)
- "Esme Letters", Echo Room Press (2016)
- "If I'm Lucky", Hybrid Press (2020)
- "The Suicide Run", Hybrid Press (2021)
- "More Ghost Tapes", Hybrid Press (2022)
- "Last Poems?", tall-lighthouse (2023)
- "Country Simple", Echo Room Press (2025)

== The Echo Room and Echo Room Press ==
19 issues of The Echo Room a poetry magazine edited and published by Cleary appeared between 1985 and 1994. Originally the magazine was produced in A4 format later issues were A5. The magazine typically published a mix of new emerging voices often with links to Northern, regional urban centres. Cleary describes his editorship as a quest to discover an urgency in poetry that was missing in the mid-80s and to publish poets willing to 'get their hands dirty'. The Echo Room relaunched in the spring of 2012 with Volume 2 Issue 1 with support from Pighog Press in Brighton. The new magazine published many poets who had appeared in the original series of magazines and retained much of its original low budget style including a Matthew Caley designed cover and a substantial number of typos.

In addition to publishing the magazine Cleary also launched the Echo Room Press in 1986 with the publication of 4 poetry pamphlets: Expecting Cameras by Cleary himself, Hicks by Matthew Caley, The Lost Boys by George Charlton and Tame the Neighbours by Martin Myers.
