= Gabriel Cleary =

Irish engineer

- Born: c. February 1945 (aged 79); Tallaght, Ireland
- Military career
- Paramilitary: Provisional IRA
- Rank: Director of Engineering
- Unit: General Headquarters (GHQ)
- Conflicts: The Troubles

Gabriel Cleary (born c. February 1945) is a former bomb maker in the Provisional IRA. A native of Tallaght, County Dublin, he was arrested in 1987 when the French and Irish governments intercepted a shipment of weapons from Libya aboard the Eksund.

After spending five years in French prison after conviction for importing arms for the purposes of terrorism, Cleary was freed in 1992. He was arrested again in a raid on an underground bomb factory in County Laois in 1996 and was sentenced to 20-years in February 1998; though he was later released from Portlaoise prison the same year as part of the Northern Ireland peace process.

Cleary was the Director of Engineering on the Provisional IRA's General Headquarters Staff (GHQ).

== Bibliography ==
- Carolan, Mary (1998). "Libel trial told Adams, Doherty and McGuinness were at IRA meeting", Irish Times, April 30, 1998.
- Kirby, Terry (1992). "Irish Police Arrest Freed Gun-Runner", The Independent. January 25, 1992.
- Murdoch, Alan (1998). "Four IRA Bomb-makers Released from Prison", The Independent. November 1, 1998.
