= Aaron Vanderpoel =

American politician (1799-1870)

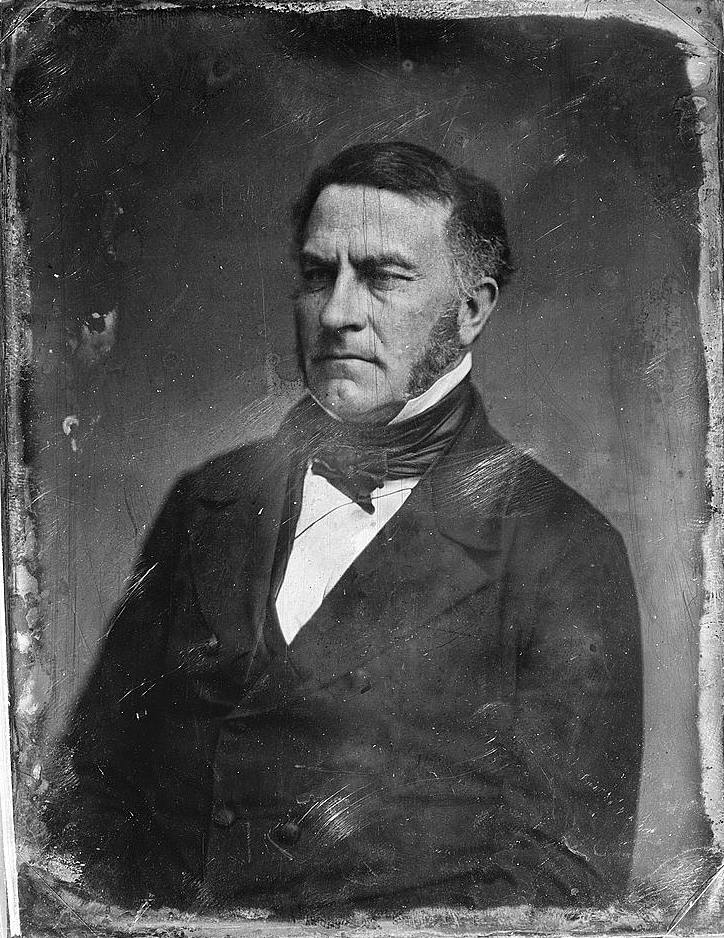

Member of the U.S. House of Representatives from New York's 8th district
- In office March 4, 1833 – March 3, 1837
- Preceded by: Seat added
- Succeeded by: Robert McClellan
- In office March 4, 1839 – March 3, 1841
- Preceded by: Robert McClellan
- Succeeded by: Robert McClellan

Personal details
- Born: February 5, 1799 Kinderhook, New York
- Died: July 18, 1870 (aged 71) New York City
- Resting place: Woodlawn Cemetery
- Party: Jacksonian Party
- Spouses: Harriet Baldwin (m. 1821; died 1837) Ellen McBride (m. 1839)
- Children: 2
- Parents: Isaac Vanderpoel; Moyca Huyck
- Education: Kinderhook Academy; Lenox Academy

Aaron Vanderpoel (February 5, 1799 – July 18, 1870) was an American lawyer and politician who served as a U.S. representative from New York for three terms. He served from 1833 to 1837, and again from 1839 to 1841.

He was a close friend of U.S. President Martin Van Buren.

== Early life ==
Aaron Vanderpoel was the youngest of six children born in Kinderhook, New York to Isaac Vanderpoel (1747–1807) and Moyca Vanderpoel (née Huyck, 1758–1827): Anne Vanderpoel (1785–1787), James Vanderpoel (1787–1843), who married Anna Doll (1782–1855) on April 7, 1808 (their daughter, Elizabeth Vanderpoel (1814–1844), married John Van Buren (1810–1866), the second son of President Martin Van Buren), Anne Vanderpoel (1789-1793), Elizabeth Vanderpoel (1791–1833), who married Lucas J. Van Alen on January 16, 1815, John Vanderpoel (1796-1851), who married Sarah W. Oakley on January 14, 1823, and was a judge of the Superior Court in Albany, and Aaron Vanderpoel (1799–1870). Vanderpoel and most of his siblings were educated at Kinderhook Academy and Lenox Academy.

Vanderpoel's maternal grandparents were Jacobus "James" Huyck of Pompaonie and Elizabeth Huyck (née Van Dyck) (b. October 17, 1758). His great-grandparents were Arent Van Dyck and Heyltie Van Dyck (née Van Alen). His paternal grandparents were Johannes "John" Van der Poel and Annatje Staats (née Nautje).

On October 20, 1775, during the Revolutionary War, Vanderpoel's father, Isaac, was commissioned adjutant of the 7th Regiment of New York Militia, the organization raised in the militia's Kinderhook District. After some time, he was removed from his position for disaffection to the American government. He then joined the British forces and commanded a company of refugees on Staten Island. During this time, he became very ill and purportedly through the influence of his mother, he was able to pass through the American lines and be brought home to be cared for. This was arranged with her relative General Pieter Schuyler. Upon his recovery, he returned to his company on Staten Island. After the war ended, his estate was confiscated by the government for his allegiance to the United Kingdom, and he was left penniless. After his marriage, however, he purchased a small farm in Chatham, New York, about a mile and a half from Kinderhook Lake, where he died on December 25, 1807.

== Biography ==
Vanderpoel studied law with Peter van Schaack before completing his studies with his brother James Vanderpoel. Vanderpoel was admitted to the bar in 1820 and commenced practice in Kinderhook, New York. He went on to serve as member of the New York State Assembly from 1826 to 1830.

=== United States Congress ===
Vanderpoel was elected as a Jacksonian to the Twenty-third and Twenty-fourth Congresses (March 4, 1833 – March 3, 1837). He was an unsuccessful candidate for reelection in 1836 to the Twenty-fifth Congress.

Vanderpoel was elected as a Democrat to the Twenty-sixth Congress (March 4, 1839 – March 3, 1841). He retired from Congress and settled in New York City. He served as judge of the superior court from 1842 to 1850.

During his congressional service, he acquired the nickname of the "Kinderhook roarer" because of the power of his voice and his oratorical skills.

== Personal life ==
Vanderpoel was married twice. The first time was to Harriet Baldwin on September 3, 1821, who died in April 1837. The second was to Ellen McBride on April 2, 1839. With Ellen, he had two children.

== Death and burial ==
He died at his residence on 16th Street in New York City on July 18, 1870, and was interred in Woodlawn Cemetery. The funeral service for Vanderpoel was held at St. George's Church in Stuyvesant Square.

== External sources ==
- United States Congress. "Aaron Vanderpoel (id: V000028)". Biographical Directory of the United States Congress.
- Aaron Vanderpoel at Find a Grave

U.S. House of Representatives
| Preceded by Seat added | Member of the U.S. House of Representatives from New York's 8th congressional district 1833–1837 | Succeeded by Robert McClellan |
| Preceded by Robert McClellan | Member of the U.S. House of Representatives from New York's 8th congressional district 1839–1841 | Succeeded by Robert McClellan |
