= McClary =

McClary is an Irish surname. Notable people with the surname include:

- Andrew McClary (1730–1775), Continental Army major in the American Revolutionary War
- Charles McClary (1833–1904), Canadian politician
- Susan McClary (born 1946), American musicologist and professor
- Thomas McClary (musician) (born 1949), American guitarist, singer, songwriter, and record producer, founder and lead guitarist of The Commodores
- Thomas Calvert McClary (1909–1972), American writer of science fiction and westerns
- Ty O'Neal, born Ty O'Neal McClary in 1978, American actor

== See also ==
- Clary (surname)
