= Bill Cleary (Irish footballer) =

Irish footballer

Personal information
- Place of birth: Ireland
- Position: Forward

Senior career*
Years	Team	Apps	(Gls)
- Bohemians
- * Club domestic league appearances and goals

Bill Clery was an Irish soccer player who played in the League of Ireland during the 1920s and 1930s.

Clery was a centre forward who played for Bohemians, who were then an amateur club. He once scored 6 goals in an FAI Cup tie against Bray Unknowns in 1930. His best goalscoring season came in 1930/31 when he netted 20 times in all competitions.

Clery is second in Bohemians' all time FAI Cup goalscorers list with 15 goals.
