= Patrick Roger Cleary =

American university founder (1858–1948)

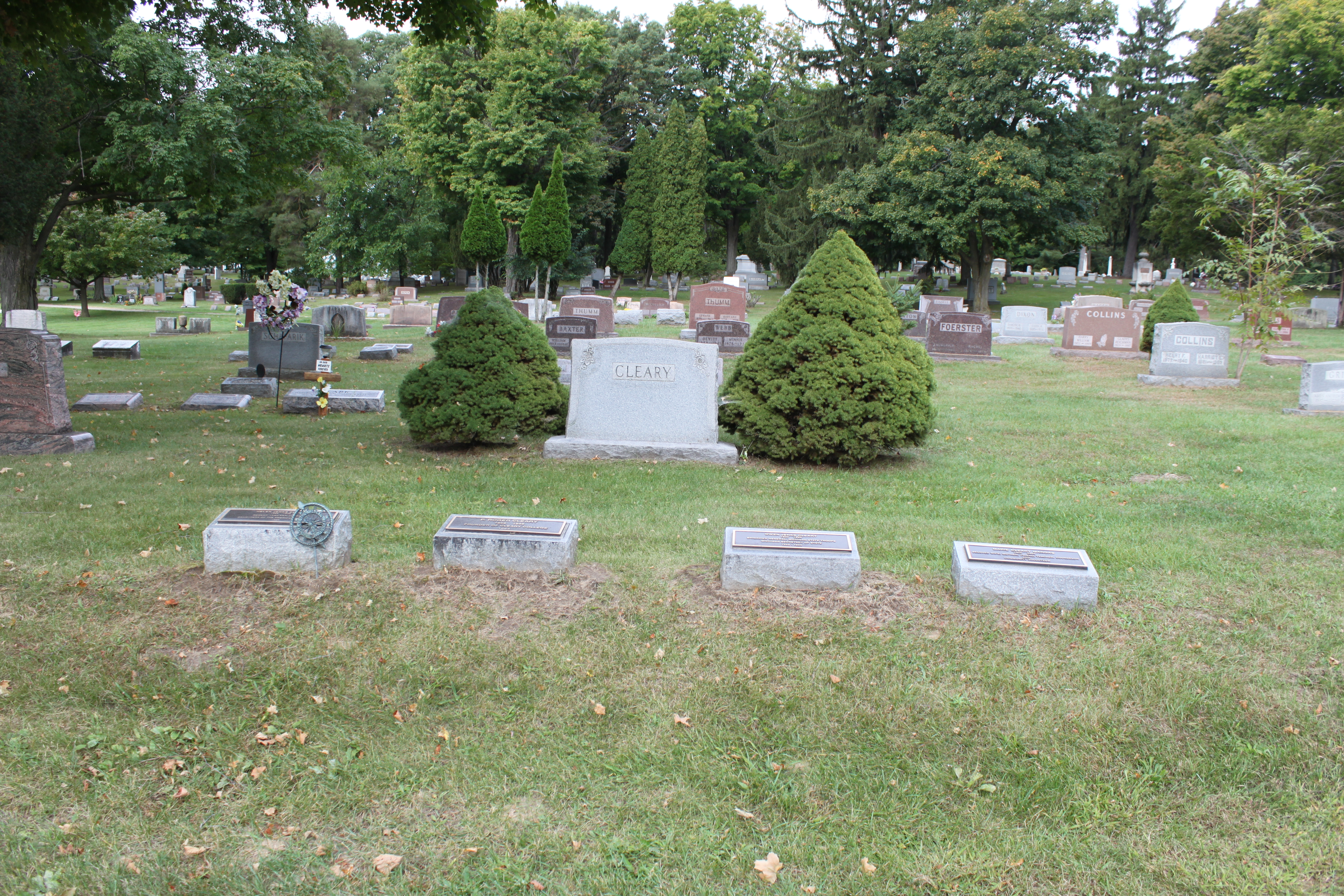
Cleary family grave plot. Owen Cleary's grave (right of center) is next to his father's (left of center), Patrick Roger Cleary

Patrick Roger Cleary (1858-1948) (known locally as P. R. Cleary) was the founder and namesake of Cleary University in Howell, Michigan.

Patrick Roger Cleary was born in Nenagh in Ireland in 1858. After his parents' death when he was eight years old, the Tuthill family, his father's employer, took in Cleary and his younger sister and gave them an English education. The Tuthills eventually sent the children to their older siblings who had earlier moved to the United States because of the poor economy in Ireland.

The children went from New York and to Hubbardston, Michigan and then completed grade school and high school within a total of four years. After he eventually attended Valparaiso University in Indiana studying business and particularly business penmanship which was very important before the invention of the typewriter. After graduating, he traveled around the area teaching penmanship after placing ads in local newspapers.

In 1883 Cleary settled in Ypsilanti planning on teaching students at what is now Eastern Michigan University, and he started his first class in rented space.

By 1885 he constructed a new school building and formed a board of trustees. At this time he married Helen Clarke Jenks from St. Clair, Michigan and they had four children, Charles, Marjorie, Ruth and Owen, all of whom attended Cleary College and Eastern Michigan University, and all of whom later worked at Cleary College. Helen Cleary also worked at the school and was an active member of the Ladies Literary Club and the local Congregational church.

After his retirement in 1938 Cleary returned to his hometown in Ireland and drove around the nation. He visited Éamon de Valera, Prime Minister of Ireland and the Irish legislature and then travelled around England where he was introduced in the House of Commons. In 1939 his wife, Helen, died.

In 1938 his son Owen Cleary became president of school, but during World War II, his father had to become President again, after the Governor requested that Owen form and lead the “Michigan State Troops” after the Michigan National Guard was called up in 1942. After the War, Owen returned as president and then became a Republican politician in Michigan. Patrick Cleary died in 1948 at age 90.
