= Cleary University =

Private business university in Michigan, United States

Coordinates: 42°35′14.8″N 83°52′49.8″W

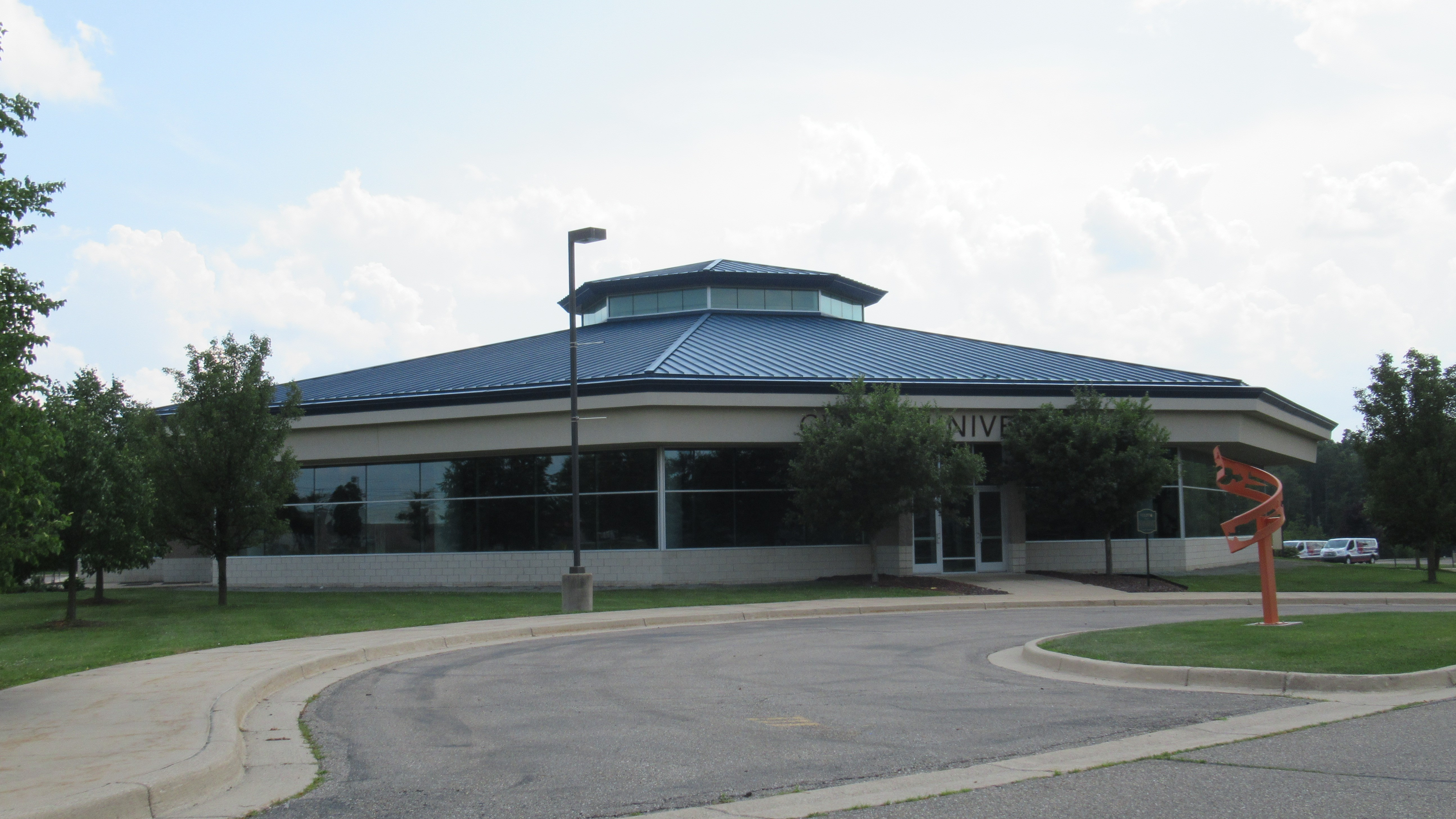
- Commons building in Howell
- Former names: Cleary School of Penmanship (1883–1891); Cleary Business College (1891–1933)
- Type: Private university
- Established: 1883; 143 years ago
- Accreditation: HLC
- Endowment: $813,882
- President: Alan Drimmer
- Students: 578 (2019)
- Undergraduates: 462
- Postgraduates: 116
- Other students: 39
- Location: Genoa, Michigan, U.S.
- Campus: Multiple campuses
- Colors: Red & Blue
- Nickname: Cougars
- Sporting affiliations: NAIA – WHAC
- Mascot: Clancy The Cougar
- Website: www.cleary.edu

Cleary University is a private university focused on business education with its main campus in Livingston County, Michigan, United States. It also has an education center located in Detroit. Cleary University offers certificate, ABA, BBA, MS, and MBA programs.

== History ==
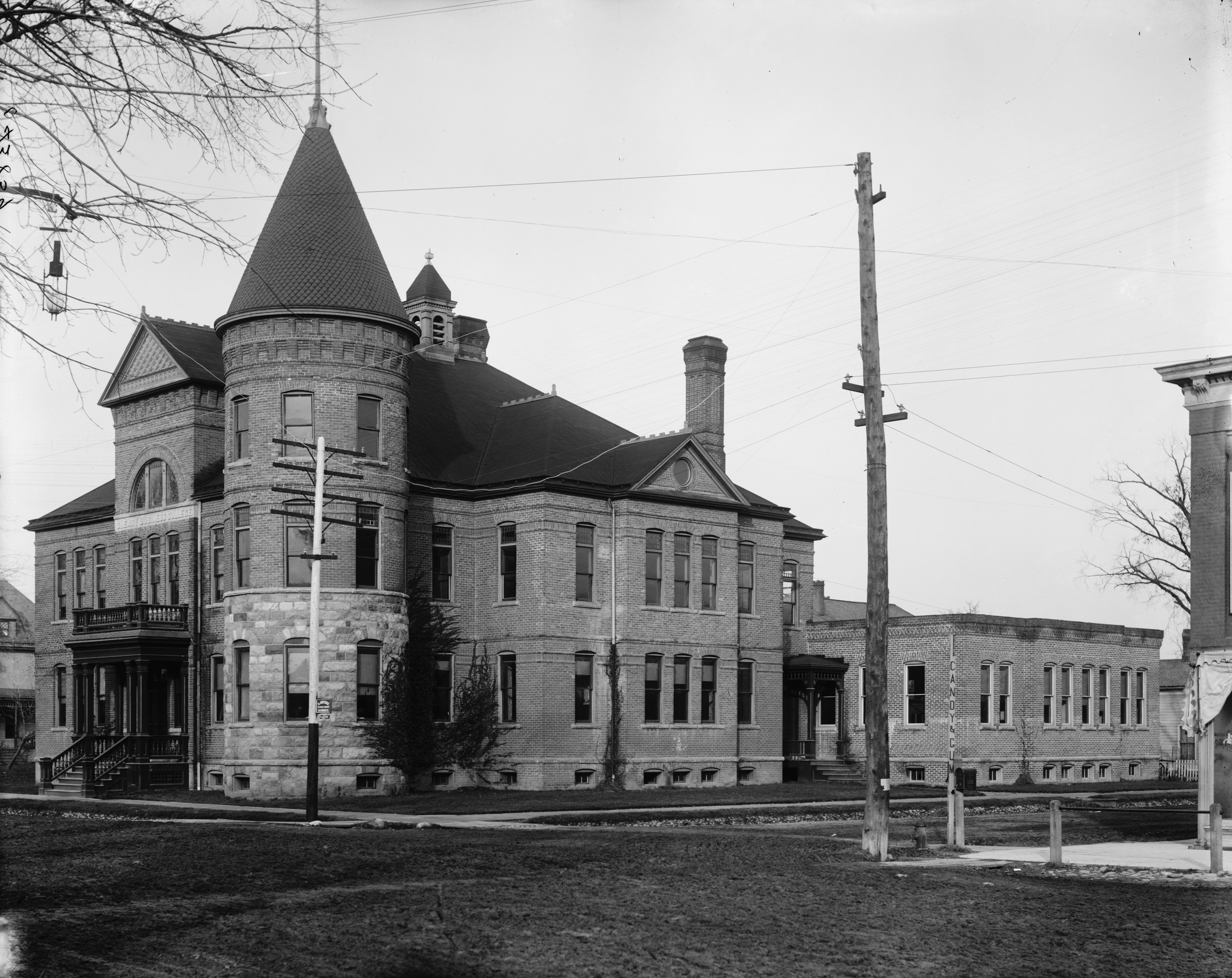
Cleary Business College, Congress Street (now Michigan Avenue), Ypsilanti, Michigan, circa 1905

Founded in Ypsilanti, Michigan in Washtenaw County in 1883 by Patrick Roger Cleary as the Cleary School of Penmanship, the school was then incorporated in 1891 as Cleary Business College and located in Ypsilanti's Union Block Building. In 1933, the Cleary Family turned the physical assets of the college over to a Board of Trustees, establishing Cleary College as an independent, not-for-profit institution. In 1938, Patrick Roger Cleary retired and his son, Owen Cleary, became president. The college was located at its original, purpose-built building in Downtown Ypsilanti at 300 West Michigan Avenue (originally Congress Street) until 1960, when the college moved to a newly constructed building at 2170 Washtenaw Avenue west of Eastern Michigan University in Ypsilanti. A branch college was opened in Livingston County outside of Howell, Michigan, in 1979. By 1982, the combined campuses served over one thousand students. Cleary College purchased property at 3601 Plymouth Road in Ypsilanti's neighboring Ann Arbor, Michigan, in 1998, and vacated its Ypsilanti campus the next year. In 2002, Cleary introduced graduate programs and changed its name to Cleary University. Cleary University sold its Ann Arbor campus, known as Cleary University - Washtenaw Campus in 2014. The university's Howell campus, known as Cleary University - Livingston Campus, remains its main, flagship campus.

== Livingston Campus ==
The Livingston Campus of Cleary University is in Genoa Charter Township, Michigan, in Howell.

== Detroit campus ==
Located at the Considine Little Rock Family Center at 8904 Woodward Avenue, the center is designed to prepare Detroit residents for job opportunities, providing a range of programs from one-year certificates to bachelor's degree programs. Programs are available online or in-center.

== Athletics ==
The Cleary athletic teams are called the Cougars. The university is a member of the National Association of Intercollegiate Athletics (NAIA), primarily competing in the Wolverine–Hoosier Athletic Conference (WHAC) for most of its sports since the 2018–19 academic year; while its men's wrestling program competes in the Sooner Athletic Conference (SAC). They were also a member of the United States Collegiate Athletic Association (USCAA) from 2012–13 (when the school re-instated back its athletics program) to 2018–19. The Cougars previously competed as an NAIA Independent within the Association of Independent Institutions (AII) when they joined the NAIA during the 2017–18 school year.

Cleary competes in 17 intercollegiate varsity sports: Men's sports include basketball, baseball, bowling, cross country, golf, hockey, soccer, track & field, and wrestling. Women's sports include basketball, bowling, cross country, golf, soccer, softball and track & field; and co-ed sports include eSports. Former sports included men's & women's lacrosse and co-ed competitive dance.

=== History ===
Cleary University sponsored both football and basketball in the early years of the university's history but dropped athletics at some point. The current athletic department was created in 2012 and joined the USCAA. Starting in 2012 with men's and women's cross country in the fall and men's and women's golf in the spring, the university rapidly expanded the athletics program in the years following. The university was awarded the 2017 USCAA's Director's Cup, which is awarded annually to the athletic program that achieves the most cumulative success in the 80-member association. Standings are based on a points system and algorithm, with points awarded based on sports offered and results of national championship events. In 2014 and again in 2015, the women's cross-country team placed second at the National Championships. In 2016, the women's cross country team placed first at the National Championships. The men's cross country team was able to compete for its first time at the National Championships and ended up placing third. 2015 marked the university's first National Champion team in Men's Golf. The university also had the individual National Champion in women's cross country in 2013 and 2014, as well as the individual National Champion in men's golf in 2015. In the 2019–20 academic year, Cleary University will add a men's and women's hockey team starting in the fall of 2019.

== Alumni ==
- Vern Buchanan, U.S. Congressman
- Winsor McCay, cartoonist
- Daniel Milstein, entrepreneur and writer
- Linda Puchala, member of the National Mediation Board
- Scott Sigler, author
- Ernie Zeigler, college basketball coach
