= M. H. Cleary =

American politician

Dr. Michael Henry Cleary (August 4, 1853 – February 2, 1933) was a politician, physician, and lawyer.

He was born on a farm in Walworth County, Wisconsin to parents Thomas and Julia Cleary (from Co. Galway, Ireland). He went to the local public schools. In 1877, he received his medical degree from the Pulte Medical College, where he attended with his brother Dr. John L. Cleary. In 1878, Cleary moved to Galena, Illinois and practiced medicine. Cleary also studied law and was admitted to the Illinois bar. He served as the Galena City Attorney. Cleary also served on the Galena Board of Education and was president of the board of education. Cleary served in the Illinois House of Representatives from 1883 to 1889 and was a Democrat. Cleary also served in the Illinois Senate from 1913 to 1917. Cleary died at the home of Thomas Smith in Dubuque, Iowa.
