= Sean Cleary (footballer) =

Northern Ireland footballer

Seán Cleary
Personal information
- Full name: Seán Cleary
- Date of birth: 26 February 1983 (age 43)
- Place of birth: Belfast, Northern Ireland
- Position: Centre midfielder

Senior career*
Years	Team	Apps	(Gls)
- Ards
2005–2008	Cliftonville		
2007–2008	→ Armagh City (loan)		
2008–2009	Larne		
2012–2013	Donegal Celtic		
2013–2014	Crusaders		
- * Club domestic league appearances and goals

Sean Cleary (born 26 February 1983) is a football player from Northern Ireland.

He signed for Cliftonville from Ards in July 2005. He started his career with Cliftonville well, making his debut against Larne in July 2005 and winning the Player of the Month award two months later. Although he was injured for most of the 2006–07 season, he still managed to score three goals.

Cleary went out on loan to Armagh City at the beginning of the 2007–08 season, but returned later in the season as Cliftonville challenged for the Irish Premier League title. However, in July 2008 he was told to leave the club following "a breach of club discipline".

In September 2008 he moved to Larne. In August 2013 he joined Crusaders, scoring once in six appearances before his release later that season.
