= William J. Cleary =

American politician

William J. Cleary (May 14, 1870 – 1952) was a politician from the U.S. state of Michigan. From 1943 to 1950 he was member of the Michigan State House of Representatives for the second house district from Berrien County. Cleary was born of Irish ancestry, near Greenfield, Indiana, in Hancock County. His profession was civil engineer and he lived in Benton Harbor.
