= 1834 New York City mayoral election =

- 8–10 April 1834
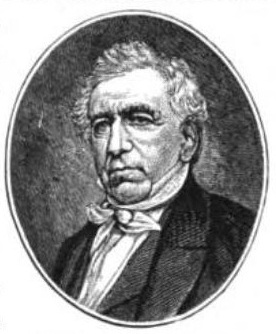

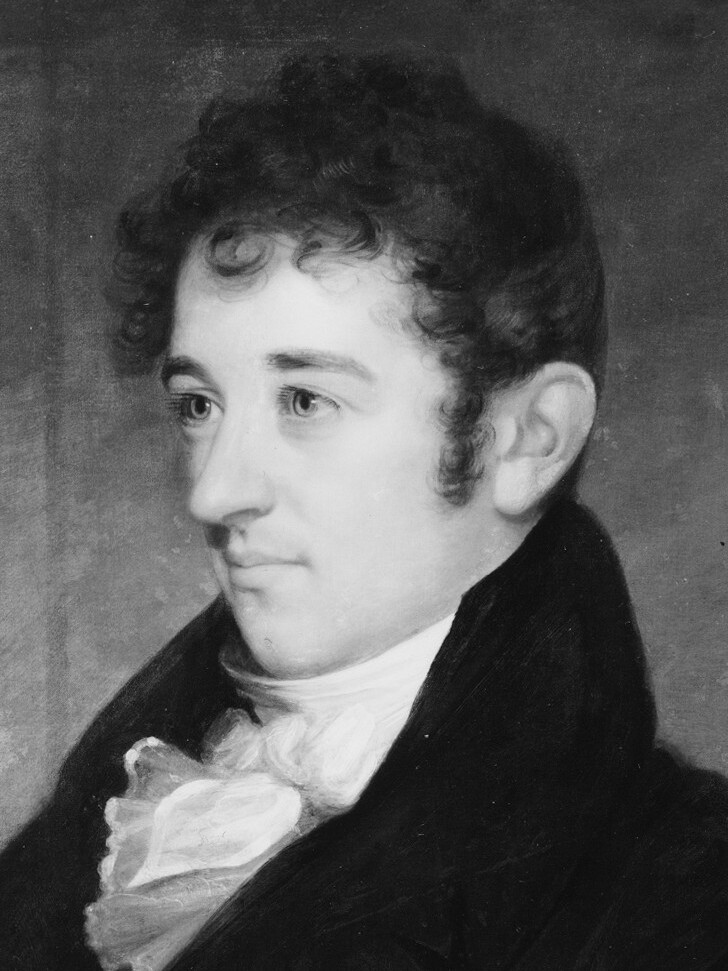
Nominee	Cornelius Lawrence	Gulian C. Verplanck
Party	Democratic	Whig
Popular vote	17,575	17,372
Percentage	50.29%	49.71%
Mayor before election
Gideon Lee
Democratic
Elected mayor
Cornelius Lawrence
Democratic

An election for Mayor of New York City was held between 8–10 April 1834. This was the first popular election for the mayoralty, previous mayors had been appointed by the Common Council of New York.

Democratic nominee Cornelius Lawrence defeated Whig Gulian C. Verplanck.

== Rioting ==
As the first election to the mayoralty of New York City, the election was beset with riots. The rioting began on the first day of voting, 8 April 1834, and included the destruction of ballots, with 1 fatality and 20 injured. Whig supporters decorated a frigate, the Constitution, with Whig banners and dragged it up Broadway. On 9 April, Democratic supporters went to destroy a pro-Whig newspaper office on Wall Street. On the final day of the polls being open, 10 April, several gun shops were ransacked by crowds, with order being restored after the mayor called in 1,200 infantry and calvarymen.

== General election ==
=== Candidates ===
- Gulian C. Verplanck, former U.S. representative and former member of the New York State Assembly (Whig)
- Cornelius Lawrence, U.S. representative (Democratic)

=== Results ===
In the final results, Lawrence defeated Verplanck by 203 votes out of 35,000 cast.

1850 New York City mayoral election
Party	Candidate	Votes	%
Democratic	Cornelius Lawrence	17,575	50.29%
Whig	Gulian C. Verplanck	17,372	49.71%
Total votes		34,947	100.00%
