= Churchill C. Cambreleng =

American politician (1786–1862)

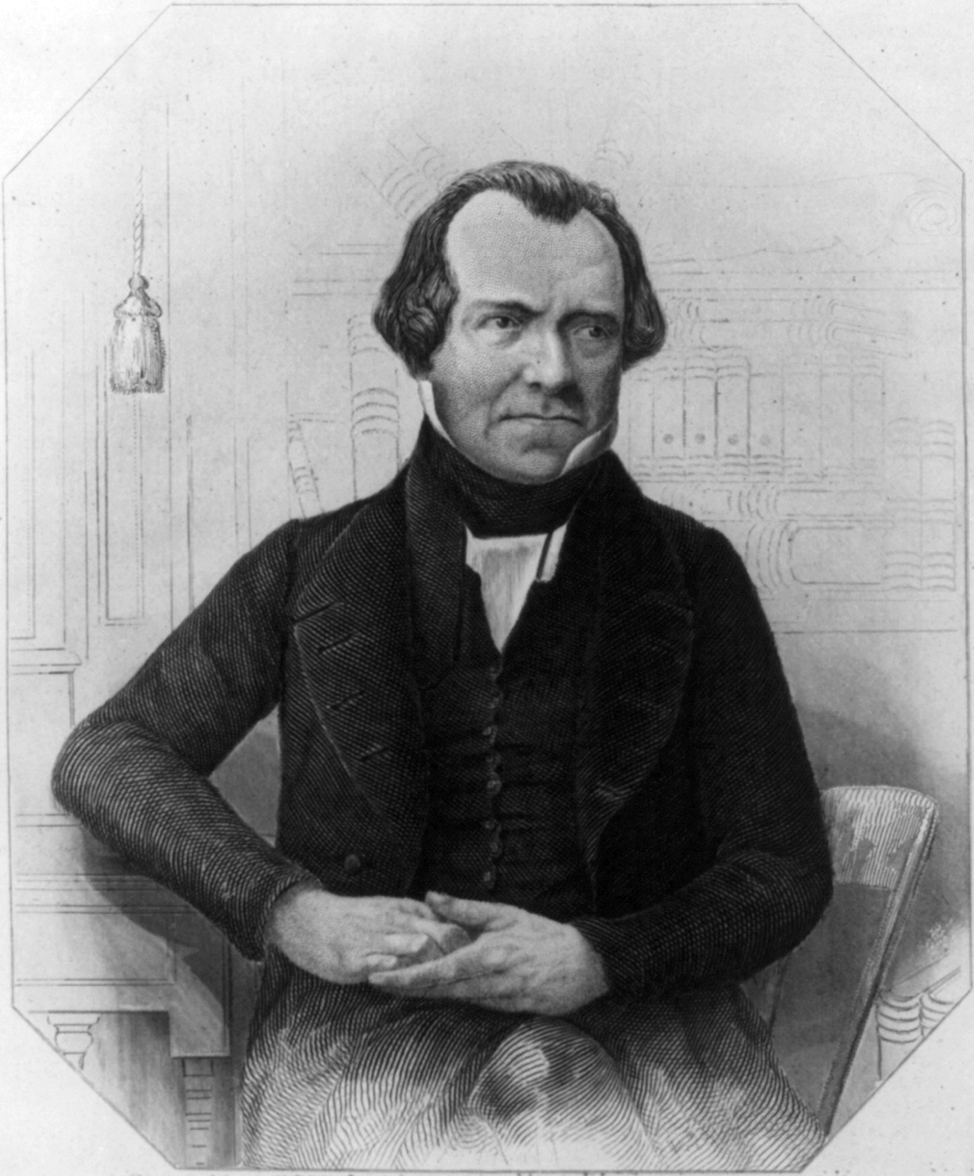

United States Minister to Russia
- In office September 21, 1840 – July 13, 1841
- President: Martin Van Buren; William Henry Harrison; John Tyler
- Preceded by: George M. Dallas
- Succeeded by: Charles S. Todd

Member of the U.S. House of Representatives from New York
- In office March 4, 1821 – March 3, 1839
- Preceded by: Henry Meigs; Peter H. Wendover
- Succeeded by: Moses H. Grinnell; Edward Curtis; James Monroe; Ogden Hoffman
- Constituency: 2nd district (1821–23); 3rd district (1823–39)

Personal details
- Born: Churchill Caldom Cambreleng; October 24, 1786 Washington, North Carolina, U.S.
- Died: April 30, 1862 (aged 75) West Neck, New York, U.S.
- Resting place: Green-Wood Cemetery, Brooklyn, New York
- Party: Democratic-Republican; Crawford Republican; Jacksonian; Democratic; Barnburner; Free Soil Party
- Spouse: Phebe Glover (m. 1835-1862, his death)
- Profession: Businessman

Churchill Caldom Cambreleng (October 24, 1786 – April 30, 1862) was an American businessman and politician from New York. He is notable for his service in the United States House of Representatives from 1821 to 1839, including terms as chairman of several high-profile committees. In addition, he served as U.S. Minister to Russia from 1840 to 1841.

== Life ==
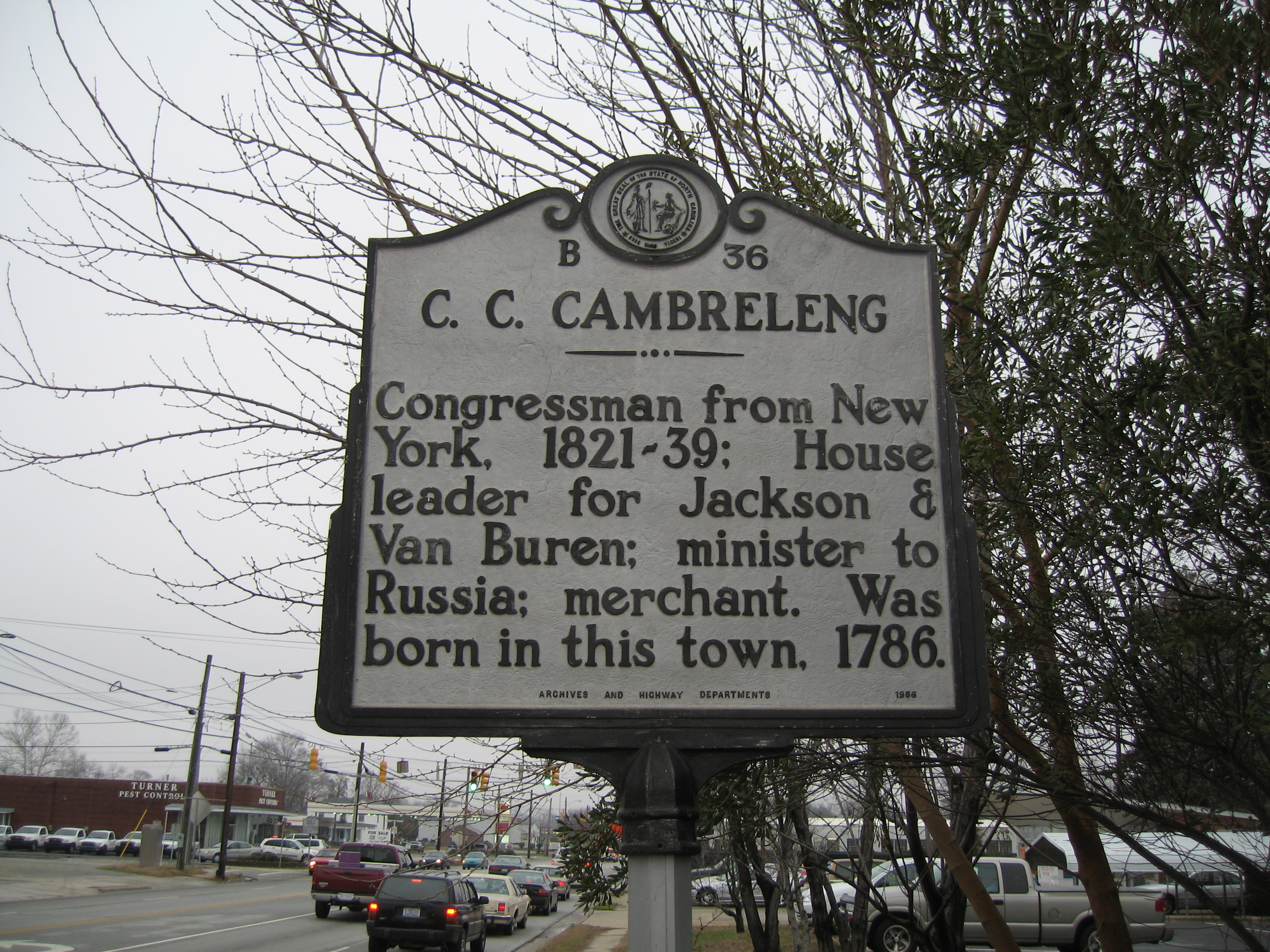
Historical marker designating the birth city of Cambreleng

C. C. Cambreleng was born in Washington, Beaufort County, North Carolina on October 24, 1786, the son of Stephen Cambreleng and Ann (Patten) Cambreleng. He attended school in New Bern, North Carolina, and moved to New York City in 1802.

=== Early career ===
Intending to begin a career as a businessman, Cambreleng worked as a clerk in a mercantile counting room. In 1806 he moved to Providence, Rhode Island, where he was the chief clerk for a merchant with interests in the Pacific Northwest. After the death of his employer, Cambreleng intended to pursue a business opportunity in New Orleans, but was unable to remain there because of ongoing combat during the War of 1812.

He then returned to New York City, where he was employed by John Jacob Astor. Cambreleng traveled throughout Europe and Asia while handling commercial opportunities for himself and Astor, and he eventually became wealthy as a result of his business success.

=== Congress ===
Cambreleng was elected as a Democratic-Republican to the 17th, and was re-elected as a Crawford Democratic-Republican to the 18th, as a Jacksonian to the 19th, 20th, 21st, 22nd, 23rd and 24th, and as a Democrat to the 25th United States Congress, holding office from December 3, 1821 to March 3, 1839. He was Chairman of the Commerce Committee (20th to 22nd Congresses), Foreign Affairs Committee (23rd Congress) and Ways and Means Committee (24th and 25th Congresses).

During the 22nd United States Congress, Cambreleng was critical of Louis McLane's report regarding the Second Bank of the United States, writing "The Treasury report is as bad as it can possibly be—a new version of Alexander Hamilton's reports on a National Bank and manufacturers, and totally unsuited to this age of democracy and reform."

=== Later career ===
Upon its incorporation in 1831, he became the first President of the Saratoga and Schenectady Railroad.

President Martin Van Buren appointed him United States Minister to Russia in 1840 and he served until 1841. He was a delegate from Suffolk County to the New York State Constitutional Convention of 1846.

He attended the 1848 Democratic National Convention in Baltimore as a Barnburner but withdrew with his faction, and participated in the nomination of Van Buren as the candidate of the Free Soil Party. Later he rejoined the Democrats and supported Franklin Pierce for president in 1852.

== Death and burial ==
Cambreleng died in West Neck, Suffolk County, New York on April 30, 1862. He was buried at Brooklyn's Green-Wood Cemetery, Section 73, Lot 4150.

== Family ==
In 1835, Cambreleng married Phebe Glover, the daughter of New York City merchant John J. Glover. They remained married until Cambreleng's death, and had no children.

== Sources ==
=== Books ===
- Barrett, Walter (1865). The Old Merchants of New York City. New York, NY: Carleton.
- Bowman, Fred Q. (1986). 10,000 Vital Records of Central New York, 1813-1850. Baltimore, MD: Genealogical Pub. Co. ISBN 978-0-8063-1149-4.
- Lanman, Charles (1876). Biographical Annals of the Civil Government of the United States: During Its First Century. Washington, DC: James Anglim. p. 66.
- Remini, Robert V. (1981). Andrew Jackson and the Course of American Freedom, 1822–1832. New York, NY: Harper & Row Publishers, Inc. ISBN 978-0-8018-5913-7.
- Spencer, Thomas E. (1998). Where They're Buried. Baltimore, MD: Clearfield Company. p. 234. ISBN 978-0-8063-4823-0.

=== Internet ===
- Chesnut, Paul I. (January 1, 1979). "Dictionary of North Carolina Biography: Cambreleng, Churchill Caldom". ncpedia.org. State Library of North Carolina.

=== Magazines ===
- "Political Portraits: Churchill Caldom Cambreleng". The U.S. Democratic Review. Vol. VI, no. XX. Washington, DC: Langtree and O'Sullivan. August 1839.

U.S. House of Representatives
Preceded by Henry Meigs, Peter H. Wendover	Member of the U.S. House of Representatives from New York's 2nd congressional district 1821–1823 with John J. Morgan 1821–23	Succeeded by Jacob Tyson
Preceded by Jeremiah H. Pierson	Member of the U.S. House of Representatives from New York's 3rd congressional district 1823–1839 with Peter Sharpe 1823–25, John J. Morgan 1823–25 and 1834–35, Jeromus Johnson 1825–29, Gulian C. Verplanck 1825–33, Campbell P. White 1829–35, Dudley Selden 1833–34, Cornelius Van Wyck Lawrence 1833–34, Charles G. Ferris 1834–35, Gideon Lee 1835–37, John McKeon 1835–37, Ely Moore 1835–39, Edward Curtis 1837–39, and Ogden Hoffman 1837–39	Succeeded by Moses H. Grinnell, Edward Curtis, James Monroe, Ogden Hoffman
Diplomatic posts
Preceded by George M. Dallas	United States Ambassador to Russia; 1840–1841	Succeeded by Charles S. Todd
