= John J. Morgan =

American politician

Member of the U.S. House of Representatives from New York's 2nd district
- In office March 4, 1821 – March 3, 1823
- Preceded by: Henry Meigs; Peter H. Wendover
- Succeeded by: Jacob Tyson

Member of the U.S. House of Representatives from New York's 3rd district
- In office March 4, 1823 – March 3, 1825
- Preceded by: Jeremiah H. Pierson
- Succeeded by: Churchill C. Cambreleng; Jeromus Johnson; Gulian C. Verplanck
- In office December 1, 1834 – March 3, 1835
- Preceded by: Churchill C. Cambreleng; Campbell P. White; Dudley Selden; Cornelius Van Wyck Lawrence
- Succeeded by: Churchill C. Cambreleng; Campbell P. White; Ely Moore; John McKeon

7th Collector of the Port of New York
- In office 1841–1841
- Preceded by: Jesse Hoyt
- Succeeded by: Edward Curtis

Personal details
- Born: 1770 Queens County, New York, USA
- Died: July 29, 1849 (aged 78–79) Port Chester, New York, USA
- Resting place: Trinity Churchyard, New York, New York
- Party: Democratic-Republican; Jacksonian

John Jordan Morgan (1770 – July 29, 1849) was an American politician from New York. From 1821 to 1825, and again briefly from late 1834 to early 1835, he served in the U.S. House of Representatives.

== Life ==
Morgan was born in Queens County, New York, and attended the public schools.

=== Political career ===
He was a member from New York County of the New York State Assembly in 1819. In 1826, Morgan's adopted daughter Catherine (a niece of his first wife) married John Adams Dix who was then hired by Morgan to look after his land holdings in Cooperstown. Dix later became a US Senator, Union Army General and Governor of New York.

Morgan was elected as a Democratic-Republican to the 17th, and re-elected as a Jacksonian Democratic-Republican to the 18th United States Congress, holding office from December 3, 1821, to March 3, 1825.

Morgan was elected as a Jacksonian to the 23rd United States Congress to fill the vacancy caused by the resignation of Cornelius Van Wyck Lawrence and served from December 1, 1834, to March 3, 1835.

He was again a member of the State Assembly in 1836 and 1840. In February 1841, Morgan was appointed by President Martin Van Buren as Collector of the Port of New York to replace Jesse Hoyt who had been involved in the Swartwout-Hoyt scandal. A month later, Morgan was removed by the new President William Henry Harrison who had defeated Van Buren for re-election.

=== Death ===
Morgan died in Port Chester, Westchester County, New York, and was buried in the Trinity Churchyard in New York City.

== Sources ==
- United States Congress. "John J. Morgan (id: M000953)". Biographical Directory of the United States Congress.
- The New York Civil List compiled by Franklin Benjamin Hough (pages 71f, 194, 218, 223 and 293; Weed, Parsons and Co., 1858)

U.S. House of Representatives
Preceded by Henry Meigs, Peter H. Wendover	Member of the U.S. House of Representatives from New York's 2nd congressional district 1821–1823 with Churchill C. Cambreleng 1821-23	Succeeded by Jacob Tyson
Preceded by Jeremiah H. Pierson	Member of the U.S. House of Representatives from New York's 3rd congressional district 1823–1825 with Churchill C. Cambreleng and Peter Sharpe	Succeeded by Churchill C. Cambreleng, Jeromus Johnson, Gulian C. Verplanck
Preceded by Churchill C. Cambreleng, Campbell P. White, Dudley Selden, Cornelius Van Wyck Lawrence	Member of the U.S. House of Representatives from New York's 3rd congressional district 1834–1835 with Churchill C. Cambreleng, Campbell P. White and Charles G. Ferris	Succeeded by Churchill C. Cambreleng, Campbell P. White, Ely Moore, John McKeon
Government offices
Preceded by Jesse Hoyt	Collector of the Port of New York; 1841	Succeeded by Edward Curtis
