= Charles G. Ferris =

American politician (1796–1848)

Member of the U.S. House of Representatives from New York's 3rd district
- In office March 4, 1841 – March 3, 1843
- Preceded by: Moses H. Grinnell
- Succeeded by: Jonas P. Phoenix
- In office December 1, 1834 – March 3, 1835
- Preceded by: Dudley Selden
- Succeeded by: John McKeon

Personal details
- Born: Charles Goadsby Ferris ca. 1796 The Bronx, New York, U.S.
- Died: June 4, 1848 (aged 51–52) New York City, New York, U.S.
- Party: Jacksonian, Democrat
- Spouse: Catherine Youngs
- Parent(s): Edward Ferris; Elizabeth Goadsby

Charles Goadsby Ferris (ca. 1796 – June 4, 1848) was an American lawyer and politician who served as a U.S. representative from New York, serving two non-consecutive terms from 1834 to 1835, then again from 1841 to 1843.

== Early life ==
Ferris was born at "The Homestead" in Throggs Neck, now a neighborhood in the Bronx. His father, Edward Ferris, was long an Inspector of Flour in New York and one of the founders of the Tammany Society. He made a large fortune which he left to his children, including Charles and his brother, Floyd T. Ferris, a physician. His mother was Elizabeth Goadsby (d. 1825), daughter of Sir Thomas Goadsby of England. His sister, Caroline Adelia Ferris, was married to Captain John W. Richardson.

He received a limited education and then studied law. In 1816, he received a Master of Arts degree from Columbia University.

== Career ==
After being admitted to the bar, practiced in New York City. He served as member of the New York City Board of Aldermen in 1832 and 1833.

=== Tenure in Congress ===
Ferris was elected as a Jacksonian to the Twenty-third Congress to fill the vacancy caused by the resignation of Dudley Selden and served from December 1, 1834, to March 3, 1835. Reportedly, Ferris introduced Napoleon III to Tyler during Napoleon's tour of New York in 1837.

Ferris was elected as a Democrat to the Twenty-seventh Congress serving from March 4, 1841 until March 3, 1843. He was largely instrumental in securing an appropriation through Congress to build the first telegraph line.

=== Later career ===
After he left Congress, he was appointed as Collector of the Port of New York by President John Tyler but his nomination was rejected by the U.S. Senate and Cornelius P. Van Ness served instead. In 1845, he was reportedly worth $200,000 (~$6.39 million in 2024).

== Personal life ==
Ferris was married to Catherine Youngs. Together, they were the parents of one daughter, named after his only sister, Caroline Adelia Ferris, who married Glover Clapham in 1850. After his death, she remarried to Samuel Lewis.

=== Death ===
Ferris died in New York City on June 4, 1848.

U.S. House of Representatives
Preceded by Churchill C. Cambreleng; Campbell P. White; Dudley Selden; Cornelius Lawrence	Member of the U.S. House of Representatives from New York's 3rd congressional district 1834–1835 with Churchill C. Cambreleng, Campbell P. White, and John J. Morgan	Succeeded by Churchill C. Cambreleng; Campbell P. White; Ely Moore; John McKeon
Preceded by Moses H. Grinnell; Edward Curtis; James Monroe; Ogden Hoffman	Member of the U.S. House of Representatives from New York's 3rd congressional district 1841–1843 with Fernando Wood, James I. Roosevelt, and John McKeon	Succeeded by Jonas P. Phoenix
