= 23rd United States Congress =

1833-1835 U.S. Congress

←	22nd	24th	→
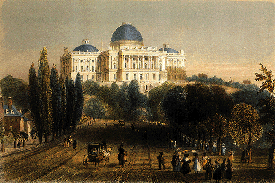
- United States Capitol (1827)

Overview
- Legislative body: United States Congress
- Jurisdiction: United States
- Term: March 4, 1833 – March 4, 1835

Senate
- Members: 48
- President: Martin Van Buren (J)
- President pro tempore: Hugh L. White (NR); George Poindexter (J); John Tyler (J)
- Party control: National Republican

House of Representatives
- Members: 240 representatives 3 non-voting delegates
- Speaker: Andrew Stevenson (J); John Bell (J)
- Party control: Jacksonian

Sessions
- 1st: December 2, 1833 – June 30, 1834
- 2nd: December 1, 1834 – March 4, 1835

The 23rd United States Congress was a meeting of the legislative branch of the United States federal government, consisting of the United States Senate and the United States House of Representatives. It met in Washington, D.C. from March 4, 1833, to March 4, 1835, during the fifth and sixth years of Andrew Jackson's presidency. The apportionment of seats in the House of Representatives was based on the 1830 United States census. The Senate had an Anti-Jacksonian or National Republican majority, and the House had a Jacksonian or Democratic majority.

== Major events ==
- March 28, 1834: Senate censured President Andrew Jackson for defunding the Second Bank of the United States
- June 2, 1834: A special election for the House speakership takes 10 ballots.
- January 30, 1835: Richard Lawrence unsuccessfully tried to assassinate President Jackson in the United States Capitol; this was the first assassination attempt against a President of the United States.

== Major legislation ==
- June 28, 1834: Coinage Act of 1834, Sess. 1, ch. 95, 4 Stat. 699
- June 30, 1834: An Act to Regulate Trade and Intercourse With the Indian Tribes, Sess. 1, ch. 161, 4 Stat. 729

== Party summary ==
The count below identifies party affiliations at the beginning of the first session of this congress. Changes resulting from subsequent replacements are shown below in the "Changes in membership" section.

=== Senate ===
Senate membership

Beginning of the Congress

Ending of the Congress

	Party (shading shows control)			Total	Vacant
	National Republican (NR)	Jacksonian (J)	Nullifier (N)	Total	Vacant
End of previous congress	23	23	1	47	1
Begin	25	19	1	45	3
End	26	20	2	48	0
Final voting share	54.2%	41.7%	4.2%		
Beginning of next congress	24	21	2	47	1

=== House of Representatives ===
For the beginning of this congress, the size of the House was increased from 213 seats to 240 seats, following the 1830 United States census.

House membership

Beginning of the Congress

End of the Congress

	Party (shading shows control)				Total	Vacant
	National Republican (NR)	Anti- Masonic (AM)	Jacksonian (J)	Nullifier (N)	Total	Vacant
End of previous congress	62	17	129	4	212	1
Begin	60	25	145	9	239	1
End	62	25	143	8	238	2
Final voting share	26.1%	10.5%	60.1%	3.4%		
Beginning of next congress	76	15	139	8	238	2

== Leadership ==
=== Senate ===
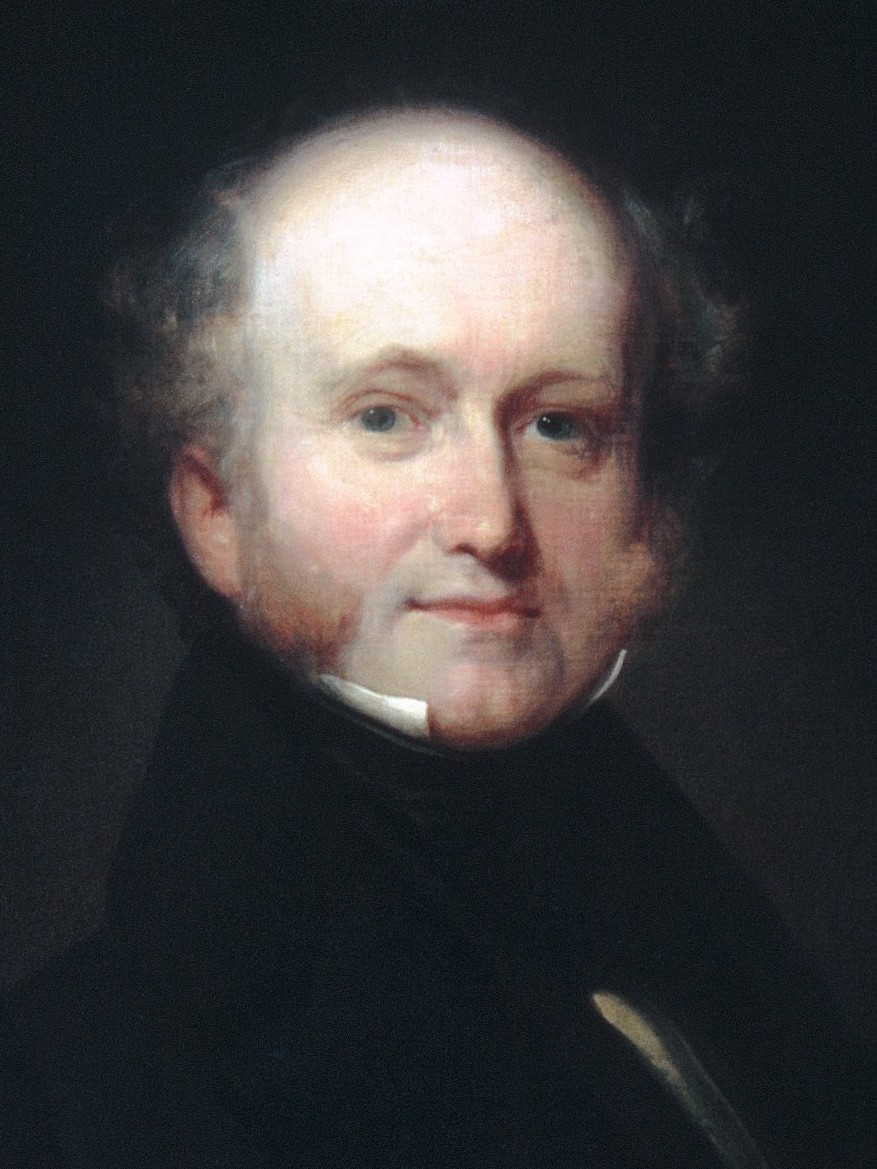
President of the Senate Martin Van Buren

- President: Martin Van Buren (J)
- President pro tempore: Hugh Lawson White (J), until December 15, 1833
  - George Poindexter (NR), June 28, 1834 – November 30, 1834
  - John Tyler (NR), from March 3, 1835

=== House of Representatives ===
- Speaker: Andrew Stevenson (J), until June 2, 1834
  - John Bell (J), after June 2, 1834, elected on the 10th ballot

== Members ==
This list is arranged by chamber, then by state. Senators are listed by class, and representatives are listed by district.

Skip to House of Representatives, below

=== Senate ===
Senators were elected by the state legislatures every two years, with one-third beginning new six-year terms with each Congress. Preceding the names in the list below are Senate class numbers, which indicate the cycle of their election. In this Congress, Class 1 meant their term began with this Congress, requiring reelection in 1838; Class 2 meant their term ended with this Congress, requiring reelection in 1834; and Class 3 meant their term began in the last Congress, requiring reelection in 1836.

==== Alabama ====
▌2. William R. King (J)
▌3. Gabriel Moore (NR)

==== Connecticut ====
▌1. Nathan Smith (NR)
▌3. Gideon Tomlinson (NR)

==== Delaware ====
▌1. Arnold Naudain (NR)
▌2. John M. Clayton (NR)

==== Georgia ====
▌2. George Troup (J), until November 8, 1833

▌John P. King (J), from November 21, 1833

▌3. John Forsyth (J), until July 27, 1834

▌Alfred Cuthbert (J), from January 12, 1835

==== Illinois ====
▌2. John M. Robinson (J)
▌3. Elias K. Kane (J)

==== Indiana ====
▌1. John Tipton (J)
▌3. William Hendricks (NR)

==== Kentucky ====
▌2. George M. Bibb (J)
▌3. Henry Clay (NR)

==== Louisiana ====
▌2. George A. Waggaman (NR)
▌3. Josiah S. Johnston (NR), until May 19, 1833

▌Alexander Porter (NR), from December 19, 1833

==== Maine ====
▌1. Ether Shepley (J)
▌2. Peleg Sprague (NR), until January 1, 1835

▌John Ruggles (J), from January 20, 1835

==== Maryland ====
▌1. Joseph Kent (NR)
▌3. Ezekiel F. Chambers (NR), until December 20, 1834

▌Robert H. Goldsborough (NR), from January 13, 1835

==== Massachusetts ====
▌1. Daniel Webster (NR)
▌2. Nathaniel Silsbee (NR)

==== Mississippi ====
▌1. John Black (NR), from November 22, 1833
▌2. George Poindexter (NR)

==== Missouri ====
▌1. Thomas H. Benton (J)
▌3. Alexander Buckner (J), until June 5, 1833

▌Lewis F. Linn (J), from October 25, 1833

==== New Hampshire ====
▌2. Samuel Bell (NR)
▌3. Isaac Hill (J)

==== New Jersey ====
▌1. Samuel L. Southard (NR)
▌2. Theodore Frelinghuysen (NR)

==== New York ====
▌1. Nathaniel P. Tallmadge (J)
▌3. Silas Wright Jr. (J)

==== North Carolina ====
▌2. Bedford Brown (J)
▌3. Willie P. Mangum (NR)

==== Ohio ====
▌1. Thomas Morris (J)
▌3. Thomas Ewing (NR)

==== Pennsylvania ====
▌1. Samuel McKean (J), from December 7, 1833
▌3. William Wilkins (J), until June 30, 1834

▌James Buchanan (J), from December 6, 1834

==== Rhode Island ====
▌1. Asher Robbins (NR)
▌2. Nehemiah R. Knight (NR)

==== South Carolina ====
▌2. John C. Calhoun (N)
▌3. William C. Preston (N), from November 26, 1833

==== Tennessee ====
▌1. Felix Grundy (J)
▌2. Hugh Lawson White (J)

==== Vermont ====
▌1. Benjamin Swift (NR)
▌3. Samuel Prentiss (NR)

==== Virginia ====
▌1. John Tyler (NR)
▌2. William Rives (J), until February 22, 1834

▌Benjamin W. Leigh (NR), from February 26, 1834

Senators' party membership by state at the opening of the 23rd Congress in March 1833. 2 Jacksonians 1 Jacksonian and 1 Anti-Jacksonian 2 Anti-Jacksonians 2 Nullifiers

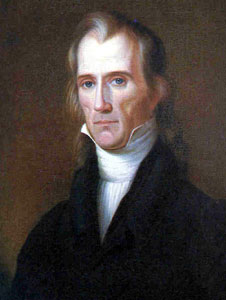
President pro tempore Hugh Lawson White

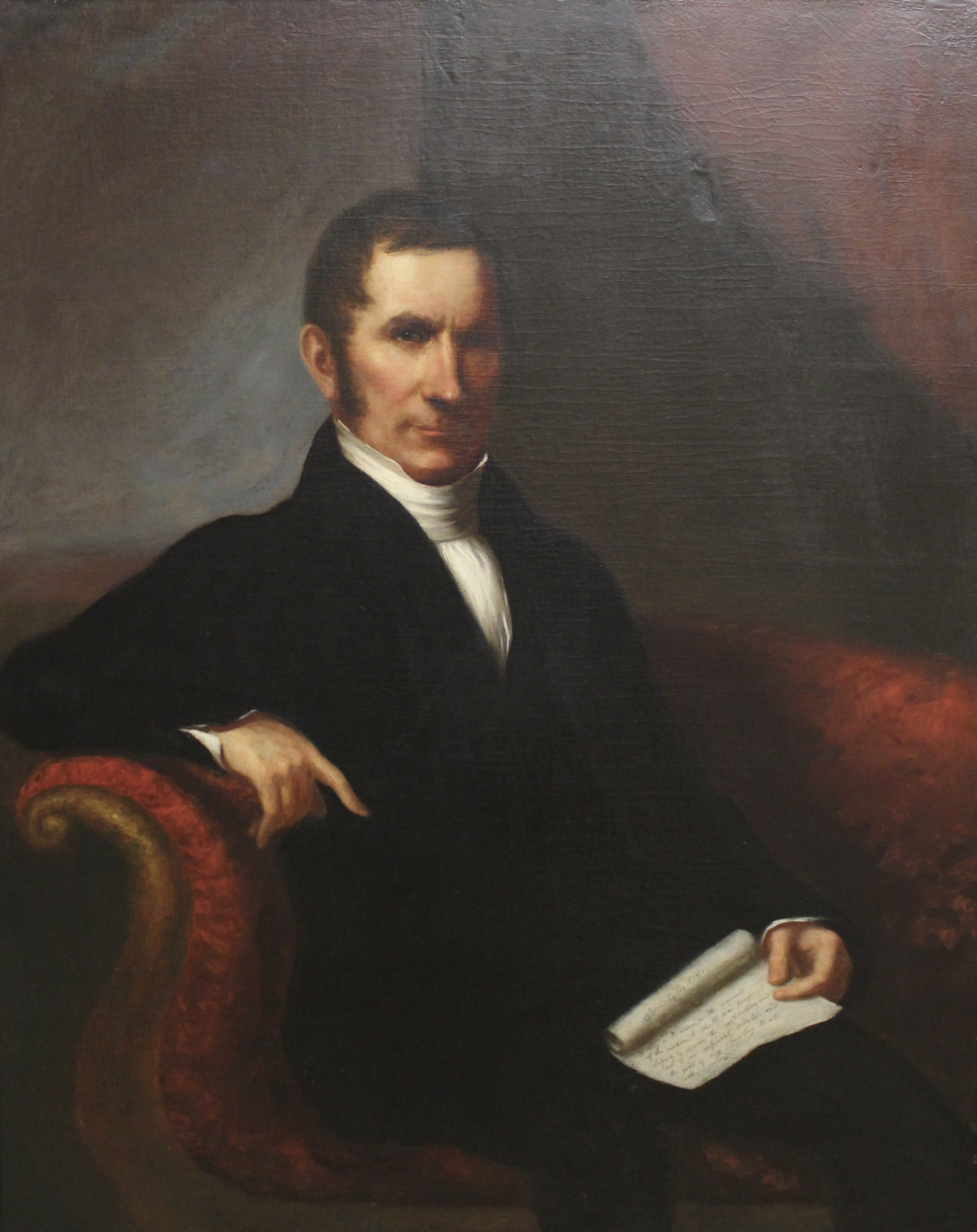
President pro tempore George Poindexter

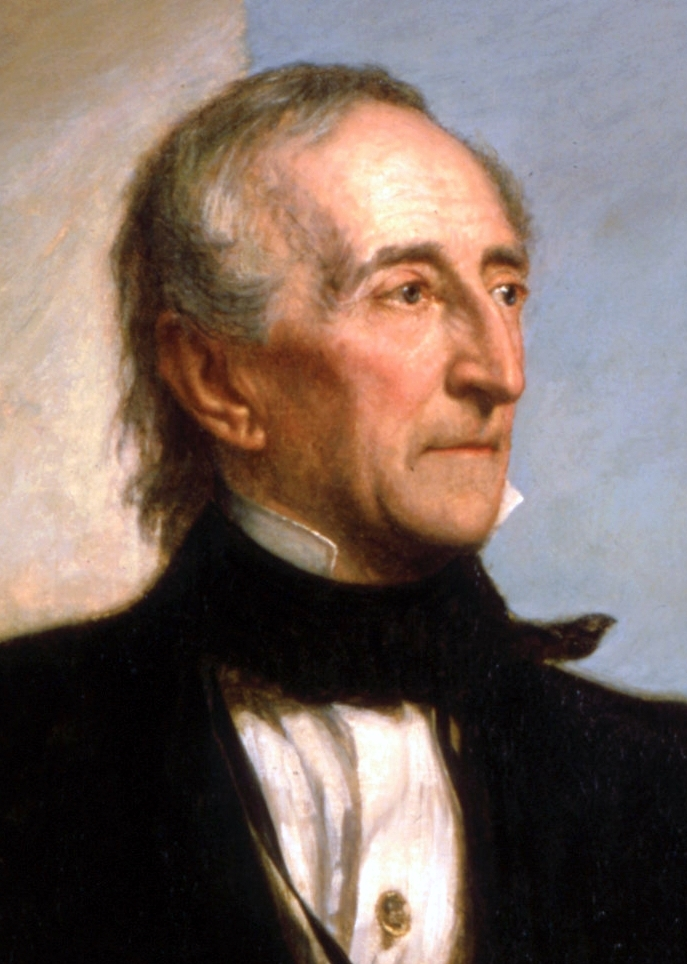
President pro tempore John Tyler

=== House of Representatives ===
==== Alabama ====
▌1. Clement C. Clay (J)
▌2. John McKinley (J)
▌3. Samuel W. Mardis (J)
▌4. Dixon H. Lewis (N)
▌5. John Murphy (J)

==== Connecticut ====
All representatives were elected statewide on a general ticket.

▌At-large. Noyes Barber (NR)
▌At-large. William W. Ellsworth (NR), until July 8, 1834

▌Joseph Trumbull (NR), from December 1, 1834

▌At-large. Jabez W. Huntington (NR), until August 16, 1834

▌Phineas Miner (NR), from December 1, 1834

▌At-large. Samuel A. Foote (NR), until May 9, 1834

▌Ebenezer Jackson Jr. (NR), from December 1, 1834

▌At-large. Samuel Tweedy (NR)
▌At-large. Ebenezer Young (NR)

==== Delaware ====
▌At-large. John J. Milligan (NR)

==== Georgia ====
All representatives were elected statewide on a general ticket.

▌At-large. Augustin S. Clayton (J)
▌At-large. John E. Coffee (J)
▌At-large. Thomas F. Foster (J)
▌At-large. Roger L. Gamble (J)
▌At-large. George R. Gilmer (J)
▌At-large. Seaborn Jones (J)
▌At-large. William Schley (J)
▌At-large. James M. Wayne (J), until January 13, 1835, vacant thereafter
▌At-large. Richard Henry Wilde (J)

==== Illinois ====
▌1. Charles Slade (J), until July 26, 1834

▌John Reynolds (J), from December 1, 1834

▌2. Zadok Casey (J)
▌3. Joseph Duncan (J), until September 21, 1834

▌William L. May (J), from December 1, 1834

==== Indiana ====
▌1. Ratliff Boon (J)
▌2. John Ewing (NR)
▌3. John Carr (J)
▌4. Amos Lane (J)
▌5. Johnathan McCarty (J)
▌6. George L. Kinnard (J)
▌7. Edward A. Hannegan (J)

==== Kentucky ====
▌1. Chittenden Lyon (J)
▌2. Albert G. Hawes (J)
▌3. Christopher Tompkins (NR)
▌4. Martin Beaty (NR)
▌5. Robert P. Letcher (NR), from August 6, 1834
▌6. Thomas Chilton (NR)
▌7. Benjamin Hardin (NR)
▌8. Patrick H. Pope (J)
▌9. James Love (NR)
▌10. Chilton Allan (NR)
▌11. Amos Davis (NR)
▌12. Thomas A. Marshall (NR)
▌13. Richard M. Johnson (J)

==== Louisiana ====
▌1. Edward D. White (NR), until November 15, 1834

▌Henry Johnson (NR), from December 1, 1834

▌2. Philemon Thomas (J)
▌3. Henry A. Bullard (NR), until January 4, 1834

▌Rice Garland (NR), from April 28, 1834

==== Maine ====
▌1. Rufus McIntire (J)
▌2. Francis O. J. Smith (J)
▌3. Edward Kavanagh (J)
▌4. George Evans (NR)
▌5. Moses Mason Jr. (J)
▌6. Leonard Jarvis (J)
▌7. Joseph Hall (J)
▌8. Gorham Parks (J)

==== Maryland ====
▌1. Littleton P. Dennis (NR), until April 14, 1834

▌John N. Steele (NR), from June 9, 1834

▌2. Richard B. Carmichael (J)
▌3. James Turner (J)
▌4. James P. Heath (J)
▌5. Isaac McKim (J)
▌6. William Cost Johnson (NR)
▌7. Francis Thomas (J)
▌8. John T. Stoddert (J)

==== Massachusetts ====
▌1. Benjamin Gorham (NR)
▌2. Rufus Choate (NR), until June 30, 1834

▌Stephen C. Phillips (NR), from December 1, 1834

▌3. Gayton P. Osgood (J)
▌4. Edward Everett (NR)
▌5. John Davis (NR), until January 14, 1834

▌Levi Lincoln Jr. (NR), from March 5, 1834

▌6. George Grennell Jr. (NR)
▌7. George N. Briggs (NR)
▌8. Isaac C. Bates (NR)
▌9. William Jackson (AM)
▌10. William Baylies (NR)
▌11. John Reed Jr. (NR)
▌12. John Quincy Adams (AM)

==== Mississippi ====
All representatives were elected statewide on a general ticket.

▌At-large. Harry Cage (J)
▌At-large. Franklin E. Plummer (J)

==== Missouri ====
All representatives were elected statewide on a general ticket.

▌At-large. William H. Ashley (J)
▌At-large. John Bull (NR)

==== New Hampshire ====
All representatives were elected statewide on a general ticket.

▌At-large. Benning M. Bean (J)
▌At-large. Robert Burns (J)
▌At-large. Joseph M. Harper (J)
▌At-large. Henry Hubbard (J)
▌At-large. Franklin Pierce (J)

==== New Jersey ====
All representatives were elected statewide on a general ticket.

▌At-large. Philemon Dickerson (J)
▌At-large. Samuel Fowler (J)
▌At-large. Thomas Lee (J)
▌At-large. James Parker (J)
▌At-large. Ferdinand S. Schenck (J)
▌At-large. William N. Shinn (J)

==== New York ====
There were five plural districts, the 8th, 17th, 22nd & 23rd had two representatives each, the 3rd had four representatives.

▌1. Abel Huntington (J)
▌2. Isaac B. Van Houten (J)
▌3. Churchill C. Cambreleng (J)
▌3. Cornelius V. Lawrence (J), until May 14, 1834

▌John J. Morgan (J), from December 1, 1834

▌3. Dudley Selden (J), until July 1, 1834

▌Charles G. Ferris (J), from December 1, 1834

▌3. Campbell P. White (J)
▌4. Aaron Ward (J)
▌5. Abraham Bockee (J)
▌6. John W. Brown (J)
▌7. Charles Bodle (J)
▌8. John Adams (J)
▌8. Aaron Vanderpoel (J)
▌9. Job Pierson (J)
▌10. Gerrit Y. Lansing (J)
▌11. John Cramer (J)
▌12. Henry C. Martindale (AM)
▌13. Reuben Whallon (J)
▌14. Ransom H. Gillet (J)
▌15. Charles McVean (J)
▌16. Abijah Mann Jr. (J)
▌17. Samuel Beardsley (J)
▌17. Joel Turrill (J)
▌18. Daniel Wardwell (J)
▌19. Sherman Page (J)
▌20. Noadiah Johnson (J)
▌21. Henry Mitchell (J)
▌22. Nicoll Halsey (J)
▌22. Samuel G. Hathaway (J)
▌23. William K. Fuller (J)
▌23. William Taylor (J)
▌24. Rowland Day (J)
▌25. Samuel Clark (J)
▌26. John Dickson (AM)
▌27. Edward Howell (J)
▌28. Frederick Whittlesey (AM)
▌29. George W. Lay (AM)
▌30. Philo C. Fuller (AM)
▌31. Abner Hazeltine (AM)
▌32. Millard Fillmore (AM)
▌33. Gideon Hard (AM)

==== North Carolina ====
▌1. William B. Shepard (NR)
▌2. Jesse A. Bynum (J)
▌3. Thomas H. Hall (J)
▌4. Jesse Speight (J)
▌5. James I. McKay (J)
▌6. Micajah T. Hawkins (J)
▌7. Edmund Deberry (NR)
▌8. Daniel L. Barringer (NR)
▌9. Augustine H. Shepperd (NR)
▌10. Abraham Rencher (NR)
▌11. Henry W. Connor (J)
▌12. James Graham (NR)
▌13. Lewis Williams (NR)

==== Ohio ====
▌1. Robert T. Lytle (J), until March 10, 1834, and from December 27, 1834
▌2. Taylor Webster (J)
▌3. Joseph H. Crane (NR)
▌4. Thomas Corwin (NR)
▌5. Thomas L. Hamer (J)
▌6. Samuel F. Vinton (NR)
▌7. William Allen (J)
▌8. Jeremiah McLene (J)
▌9. John Chaney (J)
▌10. Joseph Vance (NR)
▌11. James M. Bell (NR)
▌12. Robert Mitchell (J)
▌13. David Spangler (NR)
▌14. William Patterson (J)
▌15. Jonathan Sloane (AM)
▌16. Elisha Whittlesey (AM)
▌17. John Thomson (J)
▌18. Benjamin Jones (J)
▌19. Humphrey H. Leavitt (J), until July 10, 1834

▌Daniel Kilgore (J), from December 1, 1834

==== Pennsylvania ====
There were two plural districts, the 2nd had two representatives, the 4th had three representatives.

▌1. Joel B. Sutherland (J)
▌2. Horace Binney (NR)
▌2. James Harper (NR)
▌3. John G. Watmough (NR)
▌4. Edward Darlington (AM)
▌4. William Hiester (AM)
▌4. David Potts Jr. (AM)
▌5. Joel K. Mann (J)
▌6. Robert Ramsey (J)
▌7. David D. Wagener (J)
▌8. Henry King (J)
▌9. Henry A. P. Muhlenberg (J)
▌10. William Clark (AM)
▌11. Charles A. Barnitz (AM)
▌12. George Chambers (AM)
▌13. Jesse Miller (J)
▌14. Joseph Henderson (J)
▌15. Andrew Beaumont (J)
▌16. Joseph B. Anthony (J)
▌17. John Laporte (J)
▌18. George Burd (NR)
▌19. Richard Coulter (J)
▌20. Andrew Stewart (AM)
▌21. Thomas M. T. McKennan (AM)
▌22. Harmar Denny (AM)
▌23. Samuel S. Harrison (J)
▌24. John Banks (AM)
▌25. John Galbraith (J)

==== Rhode Island ====
Both representatives were elected statewide on a general ticket.

▌At-large. Tristam Burges (NR)
▌At-large. Dutee J. Pearce (AM)

==== South Carolina ====
▌1. Henry L. Pinckney (N)
▌2. William J. Grayson (N)
▌3. Thomas D. Singleton (N), until November 25, 1833

▌Robert B. Campbell (N), from February 27, 1834

▌4. John Myers Felder (N)
▌5. George McDuffie (N), until ????, 1834

▌Francis W. Pickens (N), from December 8, 1834

▌6. Warren R. Davis (N), until January 29, 1835, vacant thereafter
▌7. William K. Clowney (N)
▌8. James Blair (J), until April 1, 1834

▌Richard I. Manning (J), from December 8, 1834

▌9. John K. Griffin (N)

==== Tennessee ====
▌1. John Blair (J)
▌2. Samuel Bunch (J)
▌3. Luke Lea (J)
▌4. James I. Standifer (J)
▌5. John B. Forester (J)
▌6. Balie Peyton (J)
▌7. John Bell (J)
▌8. David W. Dickinson (J)
▌9. James K. Polk (J)
▌10. William M. Inge (J)
▌11. Cave Johnson (J)
▌12. David Crockett (NR)
▌13. William C. Dunlap (J)

==== Vermont ====
▌1. Hiland Hall (NR)
▌2. William Slade (AM)
▌3. Horace Everett (NR)
▌4. Heman Allen (NR)
▌5. Benjamin F. Deming (AM), until July 11, 1834

▌Henry F. Janes (AM), from December 2, 1834

==== Virginia ====
▌1. George Loyall (J)
▌2. John Y. Mason (J)
▌3. William S. Archer (J)
▌4. James H. Gholson (NR)
▌5. John Randolph (J), until May 24, 1833

▌Thomas T. Bouldin (J), from December 2, 1833, until February 11, 1834
▌James W. Bouldin (J), from March 28, 1834

▌6. Thomas Davenport (NR)
▌7. Nathaniel H. Claiborne (J)
▌8. Henry A. Wise (J)
▌9. William P. Taylor (NR)
▌10. Joseph W. Chinn (J)
▌11. Andrew Stevenson (J), until June 2, 1834

▌John Robertson (NR), from December 1, 1834

▌12. William F. Gordon (J)
▌13. John M. Patton (J)
▌14. Charles F. Mercer (NR)
▌15. Edward Lucas (J)
▌16. James M. H. Beale (J)
▌17. Samuel M. Moore (NR)
▌18. John H. Fulton (J)
▌19. William McComas (J)
▌20. John J. Allen (NR)
▌21. Edgar C. Wilson (NR)

==== Non-voting members ====
▌Arkansas Territory. Ambrose H. Sevier (J)
▌Florida Territory. Joseph M. White (J)
▌Michigan Territory. Lucius Lyon (J)

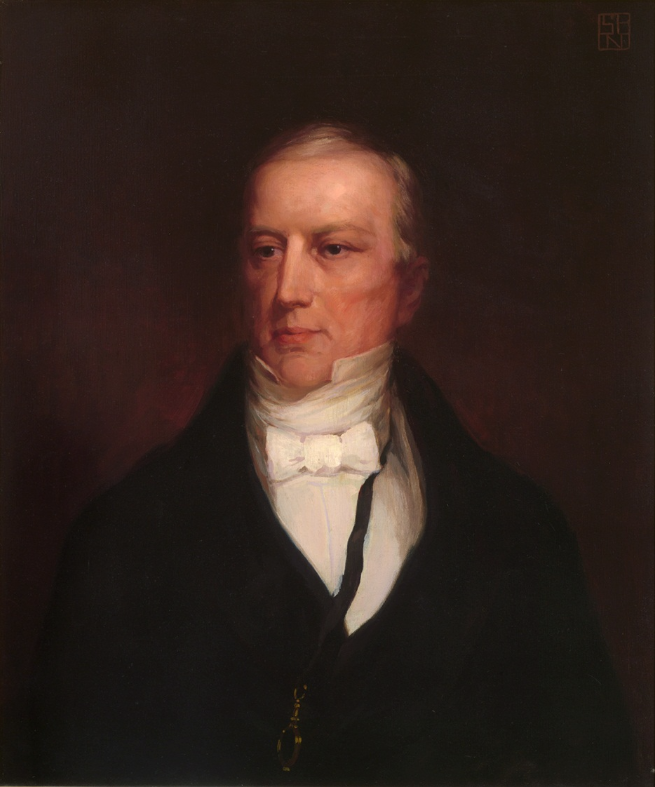
Speaker of the House Andrew Stevenson

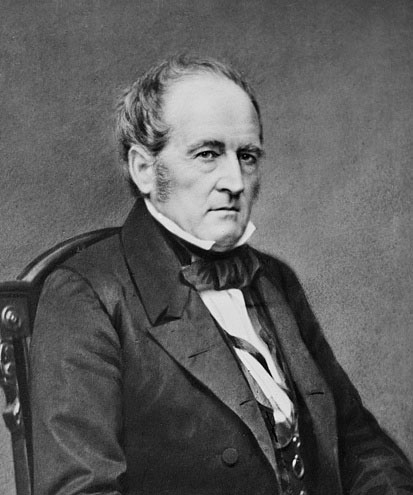
Speaker of the House John Bell

== Changes in membership ==
The count below reflects changes from the beginning of the first session of this Congress.

=== Senate ===
Senate changes
State (class)	Vacated by	Reason for change	Successor	Date of successor's formal installation (Note: When seated or oath administered, not necessarily when service began.)
South Carolina (3)	Vacant since March 3, 1833, due to the resignation of Stephen Decatur Miller (N). Successor was elected November 26, 1833.		William C. Preston (N)	November 26, 1833
Mississippi (1)	Vacant from the start of this Congress due to the state legislature's failure to elect. Appointee who had held the seat at the end of the previous Congress was elected November 22, 1833.		John Black (NR)	November 22, 1833
Pennsylvania (1)	Vacant from the start of this Congress due to the state legislature's failure to elect. Successor was elected December 7, 1833.		Samuel McKean (J)	December 7, 1833
Louisiana (3)	Josiah S. Johnston (NR)	Died May 19, 1833. Successor was elected December 19, 1833.	Alexander Porter (NR)	December 19, 1833
Missouri (3)	Alexander Buckner (J)	Died June 6, 1833. Successor was appointed December 19, 1833, and subsequently elected to finish the term.	Lewis F. Linn (J)	October 25, 1833
Georgia (2)	George Troup (J)	Resigned November 8, 1833. Successor was elected November 21, 1833.	John P. King (D)	November 21, 1833
Virginia (2)	William Rives (J)	Resigned February 22, 1834. Successor was elected February 26, 1834.	Benjamin W. Leigh (NR)	February 26, 1834
Pennsylvania (3)	William Wilkins (J)	Resigned June 30, 1834, to become U.S. Minister to Russia. Successor elected December 6, 1834.	James Buchanan (J)	December 6, 1834
Georgia (3)	John Forsyth (J)	Resigned July 27, 1834, to become U.S. Secretary of State. Successor elected January 12, 1835.	Alfred Cuthbert (J)	January 12, 1835
Maryland (3)	Ezekiel F. Chambers (NR)	Resigned December 20, 1834, to become judge of the Maryland Court of Appeals. Successor elected January 13, 1835.	Robert H. Goldsborough (NR)	January 13, 1835
Maine (2)	Peleg Sprague (NR)	Resigned January 1, 1835. Successor elected January 20, 1835.	John Ruggles (J)	January 20, 1835

=== House of Representatives ===
- Replacements: 18
  - Jacksonian: 1 seat net loss
  - National Republican: 1 seat net gain
- Deaths: 8
- Resignations: 15
- Contested election: 1
- Total seats with changes: 23

House changes
District	Vacated by	Reason for change	Successor	Date of successor's formal installation
Kentucky 5th	Vacant	Contested election of Thomas P. Moore. House denied either party the seat and declared new election	Robert P. Letcher (NR)	Seated August 6, 1834
Pennsylvania 1	Joel B. Sutherland (J)	Resigned before the term to become a judge, but then left that judgeship to seek his old seat and re-elected October 8, 1833.	Joel B. Sutherland (J)	Seated December 2, 1833
Virginia 5th	John Randolph (J)	Died May 24, 1833	Thomas T. Bouldin (J)	Seated December 2, 1833
South Carolina 3rd	Thomas D. Singleton (N)	Died November 25, 1833	Robert B. Campbell (N)	Seated February 27, 1834
South Carolina 5th	George McDuffie (N)	Resigned some time in 1834.	Francis W. Pickens (N)	Seated December 8, 1834
Louisiana 3rd	Henry A. Bullard (NR)	Resigned January 4, 1834, after being appointed as a judge of the Supreme Court of Louisiana	Rice Garland (NR)	Seated April 28, 1834
Massachusetts 5th	John Davis (NR)	Resigned January 14, 1834, after being elected Governor of Massachusetts	Levi Lincoln (NR)	Seated March 5, 1834
Virginia 5th	Thomas T. Bouldin (J)	Died February 11, 1834	James W. Bouldin (J)	Seated March 28, 1834
Ohio 1st	Robert T. Lytle (J)	Resigned March 10, 1834	Robert T. Lytle (J)	Re-seated December 27, 1834
South Carolina 8th	James Blair (J)	Died April 1, 1834	Richard I. Manning (J)	Seated December 8, 1834
Maryland 1st	Littleton P. Dennis (J)	Died April 14, 1834	John N. Steele (J)	Seated June 9, 1834
Connecticut at-large	Samuel A. Foot (NR)	Resigned May 9, 1834, after becoming Governor of Connecticut	Ebenezer Jackson Jr. (NR)	Seated December 1, 1834
New York 3rd	Cornelius V. Lawrence (J)	Resigned May 14, 1834, after becoming Mayor of New York City. This was a plural district with 4 representatives.	John J. Morgan (J)	Seated December 1, 1834
Virginia 11th	Andrew Stevenson (J)	Resigned June 2, 1834	John Robertson (NR)	Seated December 1, 1834
Massachusetts 2nd	Rufus Choate (NR)	Resigned June 30, 1834	Stephen C. Phillips (NR)	Seated December 1, 1834
New York 3rd	Dudley Selden (J)	Resigned July 1, 1834. This was a plural district with 4 representatives.	Charles G. Ferris (J)	Seated December 1, 1834
Connecticut at-large	William W. Ellsworth (NR)	Resigned July 8, 1834	Joseph Trumbull (NR)	Seated December 1, 1834
Ohio 19th	Humphrey H. Leavitt (J)	Resigned July 10, 1834, after becoming judge of the US District Court of Ohio	Daniel Kilgore (J)	Seated December 1, 1834
Vermont 5th	Benjamin F. Deming (AM)	Died July 11, 1834	Henry F. Janes (AM)	Seated December 2, 1834
Illinois 1st	Charles Slade (J)	Died July 26, 1834	John Reynolds (J)	Seated December 1, 1834
Connecticut at-large	Jabez W. Huntington (NR)	Resigned August 16, 1834, after being appointed judge of the Connecticut Supreme Court of Errors	Phineas Miner (NR)	Seated December 1, 1834
Illinois 3rd	Joseph Duncan (J)	Resigned September 21, 1834, after being elected Governor of Illinois	William L. May (J)	Seated December 1, 1834
Louisiana 1st	Edward D. White (NR)	Resigned November 15, 1834, to become Governor of Louisiana	Henry Johnson (NR)	Seated December 1, 1834
Georgia at-large	James M. Wayne (J)	Resigned January 13, 1835, after being appointed an Associate Justice of the United States Supreme Court	Not filled in this Congress	
South Carolina 6th	Warren R. Davis (N)	Died January 29, 1835	Not filled in this Congress	

== Committees ==
Lists of committees and their party leaders.

=== Senate ===
- Agriculture (Chairman: Bedford Brown)
- Amendments to the Constitution (Select)
- Audit and Control the Contingent Expenses of the Senate (Chairman: Nehemiah Knight)
- Claims (Chairman: Samuel Bell)
- Commerce (Chairman: Nathaniel Silsbee)
- Distributing Public Revenue Among the States (Select)
- District of Columbia (Chairman: Ezekiel F. Chambers then John Tyler)
- Engrossed Bills (Chairman: Ether Shepley)
- Establishing Branches of the Mint (Select)
- Executive Patronage (Select)
- Finance (Chairman: Daniel Webster)
- Foreign Relations (Chairman: William Wilkins then Henry Clay)
- French Spoilations (Select)
- Indian Affairs (Chairman: Hugh Lawson White)
- Judiciary (Chairman: John M. Clayton)
- Manufactures (Chairman: Theodore Frelinghuysen)
- Michigan and Arkansas Admission to the Union (Select)
- Mileage of Members of Congress (Select)
- Military Affairs (Chairman: Nathaniel Silsbee)
- Militia (Chairman: John M. Robinson)
- Naval Affairs (Chairman: Samuel Southard)
- Pensions (Chairman: Gideon Tomlinson)
- Post Office and Post Roads (Chairman: Felix Grundy)
- President's Message Refusing to Furnish a Paper to Senate (Select)
- Private Land Claims (Chairman: William Hendricks)
- Public Lands (Chairman: George Poindexter)
- Purchasing Boyd Reilly's Gas Apparatus (Select)
- Revolutionary Claims (Chairman: Gabriel Moore)
- Roads and Canals (Chairman: William Hendricks)
- Shiloh National Park (Select)
- Tariff Regulation (Select)
- Whole

=== House of Representatives ===
- Accounts (Chairman: Joel K. Mann)
- Agriculture (Chairman: Abraham Bockee)
- Bank of the United States (Select)
- Biennial Register (Select)
- Boundary of the Chickasaw Indians (Select)
- Claims (Chairman: Elisha Whittlesey)
- Commerce (Chairman: Joel B. Sutherland)
- District of Columbia (Chairman: Joseph Chinn)
- Elections (Chairman: Nathaniel Claiborne)
- Establishing an Assay Office in the Gold Region (Select)
- Expenditures in the Navy Department (Chairman: Joseph Hall)
- Expenditures in the Post Office Department (Chairman: Albert G. Hawes)
- Expenditures in the State Department (Chairman: Augustine Henry Shepperd)
- Expenditures in the Treasury Department (Chairman: Heman Allen)
- Expenditures in the War Department (Chairman: Frederick Whittlesey)
- Expenditures on Public Buildings (Chairman: Reuben Whallon)
- Foreign Affairs (Chairman: William S. Archer then John Young Mason)
- Foreign Relations (Chairman: William S. Archer then John Young Mason)
- Indian Affairs (Chairman: Dixon H. Lewis)
- Invalid Pensions (Chairman: Tristam Burges)
- Judiciary (Chairman: John Bell then Thomas F. Foster)
- Manufactures (Chairman: John Quincy Adams)
- Military Affairs (Chairman: Richard M. Johnson)
- Naval Affairs (Chairman: Campbell P. White)
- Post Office and Post Roads (Chairman: Henry W. Connor)
- Private Land Claims (Chairman: Cave Johnson)
- Public Expenditures (Chairman: Thomas Davenport)
- Public Lands (Chairman: Clement C. Clay)
- Revisal and Unfinished Business (Chairman: John Dickson)
- Revolutionary Claims (Chairman: Henry A. P. Muhlenberg)
- Revolutionary Pensions (Chairman: Daniel Wardwell)
- Roads and Canals (Chairman: Charles F. Mercer)
- Rules (Select)
- Standards of Official Conduct
- Territories (Chairman: Lewis Williams)
- Ways and Means (Chairman: James K. Polk)
- Whole

=== Joint committees ===
- Enrolled Bills
- The Library

== Employees ==
- Librarian of Congress: John Silva Meehan

=== Senate ===
- Secretary: Walter Lowrie
- Sergeant at Arms: Mountjoy Bayly, until December 9, 1833
  - John Shackford, elected December 9, 1833
- Chaplain: Charles C. Pise (Roman Catholic), until December 10, 1833
  - Frederick W. Hatch (Episcopalian), elected December 10, 1833

=== House of Representatives ===
- Clerk: Matthew St. Clair Clarke, until December 2, 1833
  - Walter S. Franklin, elected December 2, 1833
- Sergeant at Arms: John O. Dunn, until December 6, 1833
  - Thomas B. Randolph, elected December 6, 1833
- Doorkeeper: Overton Carr
- Postmaster: William J. McCormick
- Chaplain: William H. Hammett (Methodist), until December 9, 1833
  - Thomas H. Stockton (Methodist), elected December 9, 1833
  - Edward D. Smith (Presbyterian), elected December 10, 1834

== See also ==
- 1832 United States elections (elections leading to this Congress)
  - 1832 United States presidential election
  - 1832–33 United States Senate elections
  - 1832–33 United States House of Representatives elections
- 1834 United States elections (elections during this Congress, leading to the next Congress)
  - 1834–35 United States Senate elections
  - 1834–35 United States House of Representatives elections
