= Campbell P. White =

American politician

Campbell Patrick White

Member of the U.S. House of Representatives from New York's 3rd district
- In office March 4, 1829 – October 2, 1835
- Preceded by: Jeromus Johnson
- Succeeded by: Gideon Lee

Personal details
- Born: November 30, 1787 Ireland
- Died: February 12, 1859 (aged 71) New York City, New York, U.S.
- Resting place: St. Paul's Cemetery
- Occupation: Businessman, politician

Campbell Patrick White (November 30, 1787 – February 12, 1859) was an American businessman and politician who served four terms as a U.S. representative from New York from 1829 to 1835.

== Biography ==
Born in Ireland, White received a limited education. He immigrated to the United States in 1816 and engaged in mercantile pursuits in New York City.

=== Congress ===
White was elected as a Jacksonian to the Twenty-first and to the three succeeding Congresses and served from March 4, 1829, to October 2, 1835, when he resigned before the 24th United States Congress met. He served as chairman of the Committee on Naval Affairs (Twenty-third Congress).

=== Later career and death ===
White resumed mercantile pursuits. He was appointed quartermaster general of the State militia on January 24, 1831. He served as delegate to the New York State constitutional convention in 1845. He resided in New York City until his death on February 12, 1859. He was interred in St. Paul's Cemetery.

U.S. House of Representatives
Preceded by Churchill C. Cambreleng; Jeromus Johnson; Gulian C. Verplanck	Member of the U.S. House of Representatives from New York's 3rd congressional district 1829–1835 with Churchill C. Cambreleng (1829–35), Gulian C. Verplanck (1829–33), Dudley Selden (1833–34), Cornelius Lawrence (1833–34), John J. Morgan (1834–35), Charles G. Ferris (1834–35), Ely Moore (1835), John McKeon (1835)	Succeeded by Churchill C. Cambreleng; Gideon Lee; Ely Moore; John McKeon
