= Gideon Lee =

American politician

Gideon Lee II
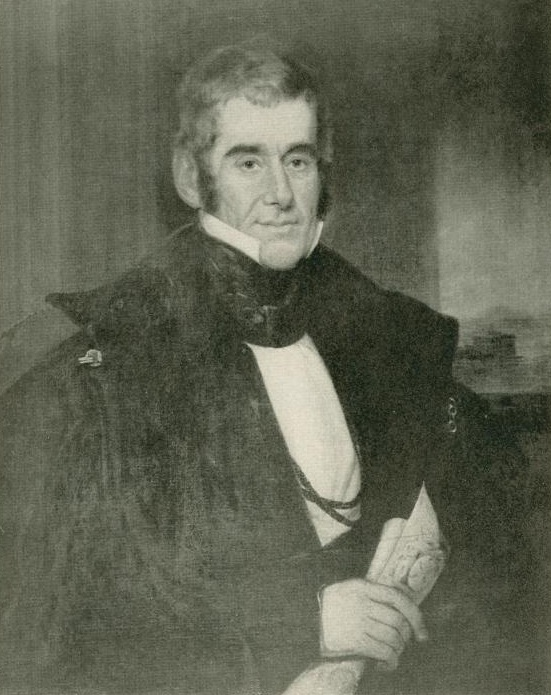

Member of the U.S. House of Representatives from New York's 3rd district
- In office November 4, 1835 – March 3, 1837
- Preceded by: Campbell P. White
- Succeeded by: Edward Curtis

61st Mayor of New York City
- In office 1833–1834
- Preceded by: Walter Bowne
- Succeeded by: Cornelius Lawrence

Personal details
- Born: April 27, 1778 Amherst, Massachusetts, U.S.
- Died: August 21, 1841 (aged 63) Geneva, New York, U.S.
- Spouse: Isabella Williamson (m. 1823)

Gideon Lee II (April 27, 1778 – August 21, 1841) was an American politician who was the 61st Mayor of New York City from 1833 to 1834, and United States Representative from New York for one term from 1835 to 1837.

== Early life ==
Lee was born in Amherst, Massachusetts, on April 27, 1778, and attended the common schools there. He was a son of Gideon Lee (1747–1811) and Lucy (née Ward) Lee (1746–1817).

The first known member of the Lee family was John "Leigh" of an ancient and honorable family of Burton street, London, England. He was born about the year 1600, came to New England, and settled at Agawam (now Ipswich), Essex County, Massachusetts, in 1635. In 1677 his sons agreed to change the spelling of the family name from "Leigh" to "Lee." Gideon belonged to the sixth generation of this family.

== Career ==
He became a shoemaker in Worthington, Massachusetts. He moved first to New York City and then to Georgia, where he was in the mercantile business, of the old firm of "Gideon Lee, Shepard Knapp and Charles M. Leupp." He returned to New York in 1807 and engaged in the leather business.

He served as member of the New York State Assembly in 1823, and as alderman from 1828 to 1830. He was Mayor of New York from 1833 to 1834, but declined to be a candidate for reelection.

Lee was elected as a Jacksonian to the 24th United States Congress to fill the vacancy caused by the resignation of Campbell P. White and served from November 4, 1835, to March 3, 1837. He then retired and moved to Seneca Lake in Geneva, New York.

He was a presidential elector on the Whig ticket in 1840, voting for William Henry Harrison and John Tyler.

== Personal life ==
On April 28, 1823, Lee was married to Isabella Williamson (1800–1870), who was the daughter of the Rev. David Williamson, a minister of the Church of Scotland. Together, they were the parents of:

- Gideon Lee III (1824–1894), who married Floride Elizabeth Clemson, a daughter of Thomas Green Clemson and Anna Maria Calhoun Clemson (a daughter of U.S. Vice President John C. Calhoun). After her death, he married Ella Frances Lorton (1844–1921), a daughter of John S. Lorton.

Lee died on August 21, 1841, in Geneva, New York. He was buried at the Washington Street Cemetery in Geneva, New York.

U.S. House of Representatives
Preceded by Churchill C. Cambreleng; Campbell P. White; Ely Moore; John McKeon	Member of the U.S. House of Representatives from New York's 3rd congressional district 1835–1837 with Churchill C. Cambreleng, Ely Moore, John McKeon	Succeeded by Churchill C. Cambreleng; Edward Curtis; Ely Moore; Ogden Hoffman
