= New York's 3rd congressional district =

U.S. House district for New York

Coordinates: 40°51′38″N 73°30′19″W

- Interactive map of district boundaries since January 3, 2025
- Representative: Tom Suozzi; D–Glen Cove
- Distribution: 99.44% urban; 0.56% rural
- Population (2025): 774,199
- Median household income: $145,790
- Ethnicity: 54.5% White; 23.5% Asian; 15.0% Hispanic; 3.6% Black; 2.5% Two or more races; 1.0% other
- Cook PVI: EVEN

New York's 3rd congressional district is a congressional district for the United States House of Representatives in the State of New York. It is represented by Democrat Tom Suozzi and predominantly features parts of the Long Island towns of North Hempstead, Glen Cove, and Oyster Bay.

NY-03 is the third wealthiest congressional district in New York, and in 2024, was the thirteenth-wealthiest nationally.

The district was one of 13 congressional districts that voted for Donald Trump in the 2024 presidential election while simultaneously electing a Democrat in the 2024 House of Representatives elections.

== Voter registration ==
Voter registration and party enrollment as of February 20, 2025
Party	Active voters	Inactive voters	Total voters	Percentage
Democratic	209,186	11,892	221,078	39.00%
Republican	148,611	7,487	156,098	27.54%
Conservative	5,000	246	5,246	0.93%
Working Families	1,249	46	1,295	0.23%
Other	14,025	871	14,896	2.63%
Unaffiliated	159,962	8,300	168,262	29.68%
Total	538,033	28,842	566,875	100%

== Counties, towns, and cities ==
For the 119th and successive Congresses (based on the districts drawn following the New York Court of Appeals' December 2023 decision in Hoffman v New York State Ind. Redistricting. Commn.), the district contains all or portions of the following counties, towns, and cities.

Nassau County (4)

Glen Cove, Hempstead (part; also 4th; includes part of East Meadow, Floral Park, Garden City, Levittown, New Hyde Park, and Salisbury), North Hempstead, Oyster Bay (part; also 2nd; includes Bayville, Bethpage, Brookville, Centre Island, Cove Neck, East Norwich, Farmingdale, Glen Head, Hicksville, Jericho, Lattingtown, Laurel Hollow, Locust Valley, Matinecock, Mill Neck, Muttontown, Old Bethpage, Old Westbury, Oyster Bay (CDP), Oyster Bay Cove, Plainedge, Plainview, Sea Cliff, South Farmingdale, Syosset, Upper Brookville, Woodbury, and part of Glenwood Landing and Greenvale)

Queens County (1)

New York (part; also 5th, 6th, 7th, 8th, 9th, 10th, 11th, 12th, 13th, 14th, 15th, and 16th; shared with Bronx, Kings, New York, and Richmond counties)

Suffolk County (1)

Huntington (town) (part; also 1st; includes Cold Spring Harbor, Halesite, Huntington Bay, Huntington Station, Lloyd Harbor, and part of Huntington (CDP) and West Hills)

Queens neighborhoods in the 3rd district include:

- Bay Terrace
- Beechhurst
- Bellerose
- Broadway–Flushing
- Douglaston–Little Neck
- Glen Oaks
- Murray Hill
- Whitestone

== Recent election results from statewide races ==
Year	Office	Results
2008	President	Obama 54% - 45%
2012	President	Obama 54% - 46%
2016	President	Clinton 52% - 44%
2016	Senate	Schumer 65% - 33%
2018	Senate	Gillibrand 60% - 40%
2018	Governor	Cuomo 58% - 40%
2018	Attorney General	James 57% - 41%
2020	President	Biden 55% - 44%
2022	Senate	Pinion 50% - 49%
2022	Governor	Zeldin 54% - 46%
2022	Attorney General	Henry 53% - 47%
2022	Comptroller	Rodríguez 51% - 49%
2024	President	Trump 51% - 47%
2024	Senate	Gillibrand 49.8% - 49.6%

== List of members representing the district ==
=== 1789–1805: one seat ===
Representative	Party	Years	Cong ress	Electoral history
District established March 4, 1789
Egbert Benson (New York)	Pro- Administration	March 4, 1789 – March 3, 1793	1st 2nd	Elected in 1789. Re-elected in 1790. Retired.
Philip Van Cortlandt (Cortlandt)	Anti- Administration	March 4, 1793 – March 3, 1795	3rd 4th 5th 6th 7th	Elected in 1793. Re-elected in 1794. Re-elected in 1796. Re-elected in 1798. Re-elected in 1800. Redistricted to the 4th district.
Philip Van Cortlandt (Cortlandt)	Democratic- Republican	March 4, 1795 – March 3, 1803	3rd 4th 5th 6th 7th	Elected in 1793. Re-elected in 1794. Re-elected in 1796. Re-elected in 1798. Re-elected in 1800. Redistricted to the 4th district.
Samuel L. Mitchill (New York)	Democratic- Republican	March 4, 1803 – November 22, 1804	8th	Redistricted from the 2nd district and re-elected in 1802. Resigned when elected U.S. Senator.
Vacant		November 22, 1804 – February 14, 1805	8th	
George Clinton Jr. (New York)	Democratic- Republican	February 14, 1805 – March 3, 1805	8th	Elected to finish Mitchill's term. Also elected in the combined 2nd and 3rd districts, see below.

=== 1805–1809: two seats on general ticket with 2nd district ===
Gurdon S. Mumford is usually listed as member from the 2nd district, and George Clinton Jr. from the 3rd district, because Clinton was elected to fill the vacancy caused by the election of Mitchill to the U.S. Senate, and Mitchill had been elected previously in the 3rd district. However, in 1804 Mitchill was already re-elected on the 2nd/3rd general ticket, and both Clinton and Mumford were elected in special elections, receiving votes in both districts.

Years	Cong ress	Seat A			Seat B		
Years	Cong ress	Representative	Party	Electoral history	Representative	Party	Electoral history
March 4, 1805 – March 3, 1809	9th 10th	Gurdon S. Mumford (New York)	Democratic-Republican	Daniel D. Tompkins was elected in 1804 but declined the seat when appointed to the New York Supreme Court. Elected to begin Tompkins's term. Re-elected in 1806.	George Clinton Jr. (New York)	Democratic-Republican	Samuel L. Mitchill (of the 3rd district) was re-elected in 1804 but resigned November 22, 1804 when elected U.S. Senator. Elected to begin Mitchill's term. Re-elected in 1806.

The districts were separated in 1809.

=== 1809–1823: one seat ===
Representative	Party	Years	Cong ress	Electoral history
Jonathan Fisk (Newburgh)	Democratic- Republican	March 4, 1809 – March 3, 1811	11th	Elected in 1808. [data missing]
Pierre Van Cortlandt Jr. (Peekskill)	Democratic- Republican	March 4, 1811 – March 3, 1813	12th	Elected in 1810. Lost re-election.
Peter Denoyelles (Haverstraw)	Democratic- Republican	March 4, 1813 – March 3, 1815	13th	Elected in 1812. [data missing]
Jonathan Ward (New Rochelle)	Democratic- Republican	March 4, 1815 – March 3, 1817	14th	Elected in 1814. [data missing]
Caleb Tompkins (White Plains)	Democratic- Republican	March 4, 1817 – March 3, 1821	15th 16th	Elected in 1816. Re-elected in 1818. [data missing]
Vacant		March 4, 1821– December 3, 1821	17th	Elections were held in April 1821. It is unclear when results were announced or credentials issued.
Jeremiah H. Pierson (Ramapo)	Democratic- Republican	December 3, 1821 – March 3, 1823	17th	Elections were held in April 1821. It is unclear when results were announced or credentials issued.

=== 1823–1843: three, then four, seats ===
Starting in 1823, three seats were elected at-large district-wide on a general ticket. In 1833, a fourth seat was apportioned to the district, also elected district-wide at-large on the same general ticket.

Cong ress	Years	Seat A			Seat B			Seat C			Seat D		
Cong ress	Years	Representative	Party	Electoral history	Representative	Party	Electoral history	Representative	Party	Electoral history	Representative	Party	Electoral history
18th	March 4, 1823 – March 3, 1825	Churchill C. Cambreleng (New York)	Democratic-Republican	Redistricted from the 2nd district and re-elected in 1822. Re-elected in 1824. Re-elected in 1826. Re-elected in 1828. Re-elected in 1830. Re-elected in 1832. Re-elected in 1834. Re-elected in 1836. Lost re-election.	Peter Sharpe (New York)	Democratic-Republican	Elected in 1822. Lost re-election.	John J. Morgan (New York)	Jackson Democratic-Republican	Redistricted from the 2nd district and re-elected in 1822.	4th seat added in 1833		
19th	March 4, 1825 – March 3, 1827	Churchill C. Cambreleng (New York)	Jacksonian	Redistricted from the 2nd district and re-elected in 1822. Re-elected in 1824. Re-elected in 1826. Re-elected in 1828. Re-elected in 1830. Re-elected in 1832. Re-elected in 1834. Re-elected in 1836. Lost re-election.	Jeromus Johnson (New York)	Jacksonian	Elected in 1824.	Gulian C. Verplanck (New York)	Jacksonian	Elected in 1824.	4th seat added in 1833		
20th	March 4, 1827 – March 3, 1829	Churchill C. Cambreleng (New York)	Jacksonian	Redistricted from the 2nd district and re-elected in 1822. Re-elected in 1824. Re-elected in 1826. Re-elected in 1828. Re-elected in 1830. Re-elected in 1832. Re-elected in 1834. Re-elected in 1836. Lost re-election.	Jeromus Johnson (New York)	Jacksonian	Elected in 1824.	Gulian C. Verplanck (New York)	Jacksonian	Elected in 1824.	4th seat added in 1833		
21st	March 4, 1829 – March 3, 1831	Churchill C. Cambreleng (New York)	Jacksonian	Redistricted from the 2nd district and re-elected in 1822. Re-elected in 1824. Re-elected in 1826. Re-elected in 1828. Re-elected in 1830. Re-elected in 1832. Re-elected in 1834. Re-elected in 1836. Lost re-election.	Campbell P. White (New York)	Jacksonian	Elected in 1828. Re-elected in 1830. Re-elected in 1832. Re-elected in 1834. Resigned.	Gulian C. Verplanck (New York)	Jacksonian	Elected in 1824.	4th seat added in 1833		
22nd	March 4, 1831 – March 3, 1833	Churchill C. Cambreleng (New York)	Jacksonian	Redistricted from the 2nd district and re-elected in 1822. Re-elected in 1824. Re-elected in 1826. Re-elected in 1828. Re-elected in 1830. Re-elected in 1832. Re-elected in 1834. Re-elected in 1836. Lost re-election.	Campbell P. White (New York)	Jacksonian	Elected in 1828. Re-elected in 1830. Re-elected in 1832. Re-elected in 1834. Resigned.	Gulian C. Verplanck (New York)	Jacksonian	Elected in 1824.	4th seat added in 1833		
23rd	March 4, 1833 – May 14, 1834	Churchill C. Cambreleng (New York)	Jacksonian	Redistricted from the 2nd district and re-elected in 1822. Re-elected in 1824. Re-elected in 1826. Re-elected in 1828. Re-elected in 1830. Re-elected in 1832. Re-elected in 1834. Re-elected in 1836. Lost re-election.	Campbell P. White (New York)	Jacksonian	Elected in 1828. Re-elected in 1830. Re-elected in 1832. Re-elected in 1834. Resigned.	Dudley Selden (New York)	Jacksonian	Elected in 1832. Resigned.	Cornelius Lawrence (New York)	Jacksonian	Elected in 1832. Resigned to become Mayor of New York City.
23rd	May 15, 1834 – July 2, 1834	Churchill C. Cambreleng (New York)	Jacksonian	Redistricted from the 2nd district and re-elected in 1822. Re-elected in 1824. Re-elected in 1826. Re-elected in 1828. Re-elected in 1830. Re-elected in 1832. Re-elected in 1834. Re-elected in 1836. Lost re-election.	Campbell P. White (New York)	Jacksonian	Elected in 1828. Re-elected in 1830. Re-elected in 1832. Re-elected in 1834. Resigned.	Dudley Selden (New York)	Jacksonian	Elected in 1832. Resigned.	Vacant		
23rd	July 3, 1834 – December 1, 1834	Churchill C. Cambreleng (New York)	Jacksonian	Redistricted from the 2nd district and re-elected in 1822. Re-elected in 1824. Re-elected in 1826. Re-elected in 1828. Re-elected in 1830. Re-elected in 1832. Re-elected in 1834. Re-elected in 1836. Lost re-election.	Campbell P. White (New York)	Jacksonian	Elected in 1828. Re-elected in 1830. Re-elected in 1832. Re-elected in 1834. Resigned.	Vacant			Vacant		
23rd	December 1, 1834 – March 3, 1835	Churchill C. Cambreleng (New York)	Jacksonian	Redistricted from the 2nd district and re-elected in 1822. Re-elected in 1824. Re-elected in 1826. Re-elected in 1828. Re-elected in 1830. Re-elected in 1832. Re-elected in 1834. Re-elected in 1836. Lost re-election.	Campbell P. White (New York)	Jacksonian	Elected in 1828. Re-elected in 1830. Re-elected in 1832. Re-elected in 1834. Resigned.	John J. Morgan (New York)	Jacksonian	Elected to finish Selden's term. [data missing]	Charles G. Ferris (New York)	Jacksonian	Elected to finish Lawrence's term. [data missing]
24th	March 4, 1835 – October 2, 1835	Churchill C. Cambreleng (New York)	Jacksonian	Redistricted from the 2nd district and re-elected in 1822. Re-elected in 1824. Re-elected in 1826. Re-elected in 1828. Re-elected in 1830. Re-elected in 1832. Re-elected in 1834. Re-elected in 1836. Lost re-election.	Campbell P. White (New York)	Jacksonian	Elected in 1828. Re-elected in 1830. Re-elected in 1832. Re-elected in 1834. Resigned.	Ely Moore (New York)	Jacksonian	Elected in 1834. Re-elected in 1836.	John McKeon (New York)	Jacksonian	Elected in 1834. Lost re-election.
24th	October 3, 1835 – December 6, 1835	Churchill C. Cambreleng (New York)	Jacksonian	Redistricted from the 2nd district and re-elected in 1822. Re-elected in 1824. Re-elected in 1826. Re-elected in 1828. Re-elected in 1830. Re-elected in 1832. Re-elected in 1834. Re-elected in 1836. Lost re-election.	Vacant			Ely Moore (New York)	Jacksonian	Elected in 1834. Re-elected in 1836.	John McKeon (New York)	Jacksonian	Elected in 1834. Lost re-election.
24th	December 7, 1835 – March 3, 1837	Churchill C. Cambreleng (New York)	Jacksonian	Redistricted from the 2nd district and re-elected in 1822. Re-elected in 1824. Re-elected in 1826. Re-elected in 1828. Re-elected in 1830. Re-elected in 1832. Re-elected in 1834. Re-elected in 1836. Lost re-election.	Gideon Lee (New York)	Jacksonian	Elected to finish White's term. Retired.	Ely Moore (New York)	Jacksonian	Elected in 1834. Re-elected in 1836.	John McKeon (New York)	Jacksonian	Elected in 1834. Lost re-election.
25th	March 4, 1837 – March 3, 1839	Churchill C. Cambreleng (New York)	Democratic	Redistricted from the 2nd district and re-elected in 1822. Re-elected in 1824. Re-elected in 1826. Re-elected in 1828. Re-elected in 1830. Re-elected in 1832. Re-elected in 1834. Re-elected in 1836. Lost re-election.	Edward Curtis (New York)	Whig	Elected in 1836.	Ely Moore (New York)	Democratic	Elected in 1834. Re-elected in 1836.	Ogden Hoffman (New York)	Whig	Elected in 1836. Re-elected in 1838. [data missing]
26th	March 4, 1839 – March 3, 1841	Moses H. Grinnell (New York)	Whig	Elected in 1838. Lost re-election.	Edward Curtis (New York)	Whig	Elected in 1836.	James Monroe (New York)	Whig	Elected in 1838. Lost re-election.	Ogden Hoffman (New York)	Whig	Elected in 1836. Re-elected in 1838. [data missing]
27th	March 4, 1841 – March 3, 1843	Charles G. Ferris (New York)	Democratic	Elected in 1840. [data missing]	Fernando Wood (New York)	Democratic	Elected in 1840. Lost re-election.	James I. Roosevelt (New York)	Democratic	Elected in 1840. Retired.	John McKeon (New York)	Democratic	Elected in 1840. Lost re-election.

=== 1843–present ===
Representative	Party	Years	Cong ress	Electoral history	District location
The single-seat district was restored in 1843
Jonas P. Phoenix (New York)	Whig	March 4, 1843 – March 3, 1845	28th	Elected in 1842. [data missing]	
William S. Miller (New York)	American	March 4, 1845 – March 3, 1847	29th	Elected in 1844. [data missing]	
Henry Nicoll (New York)	Democratic	March 4, 1847 – March 3, 1849	30th	Elected in 1846. [data missing]	
Jonas P. Phoenix (New York)	Whig	March 4, 1849 – March 3, 1851	31st	Elected in 1848. [data missing]	
Emanuel B. Hart (New York)	Democratic	March 4, 1851 – March 3, 1853	32nd	Elected in 1850. [data missing]	
Hiram Walbridge (New York)	Democratic	March 4, 1853 – March 3, 1855	33rd	Elected in 1852. [data missing]	
Guy R. Pelton (New York)	Opposition	March 4, 1855 – March 3, 1857	34th	Elected in 1854. [data missing]	
Daniel Sickles (New York)	Democratic	March 4, 1857 – March 3, 1861	35th 36th	Elected in 1856. Re-elected in 1858. [data missing]	
Benjamin Wood (New York)	Democratic	March 4, 1861 – March 3, 1863	37th	Elected in 1860. Redistricted to the 4th district.	
Moses F. Odell (Brooklyn)	Democratic	March 4, 1863 – March 3, 1865	38th	Redistricted from the 2nd district and re-elected in 1862. [data missing]	
James Humphrey (Brooklyn)	Republican	March 4, 1865 – June 16, 1866	39th	Elected in 1864. Died.	
Vacant		June 16, 1866 – December 4, 1866	39th		
John W. Hunter (Brooklyn)	Democratic	December 4, 1866 – March 3, 1867	39th	Elected to finish Humphrey's term. [data missing]	
William E. Robinson (Brooklyn)	Democratic	March 4, 1867 – March 3, 1869	40th	Elected in 1866. [data missing]	
Henry Warner Slocum (Brooklyn)	Democratic	March 4, 1869 – March 3, 1873	41st 42nd	Elected in 1868. Re-elected in 1870. [data missing] Retired.	
Stewart L. Woodford (Brooklyn)	Republican	March 4, 1873 – July 1, 1874	43rd	Elected in 1872. Resigned.	
Vacant		July 1, 1874 – November 3, 1874	43rd		
Simeon B. Chittenden (Brooklyn)	Independent; Republican	November 3, 1874 – March 3, 1877	43rd 44th 45th 46th	Elected to finish Woodford's term. Re-elected in 1874. [data missing]	
Simeon B. Chittenden (Brooklyn)	Republican	March 4, 1877 – March 3, 1881	43rd 44th 45th 46th	Re-elected in 1876. Re-elected in 1878. [data missing]	
J. Hyatt Smith (Brooklyn)	Independent	March 4, 1881 – March 3, 1883	47th	Elected in 1880. [data missing]	
Darwin R. James (Brooklyn)	Republican	March 4, 1883 – March 3, 1887	48th 49th	Elected in 1882. Re-elected in 1884. [data missing]	
Stephen V. White (Brooklyn)	Republican	March 4, 1887 – March 3, 1889	50th	Elected in 1886. [data missing]	
William C. Wallace (Brooklyn)	Republican	March 4, 1889 – March 3, 1891	51st	Elected in 1888. [data missing]	
William J. Coombs (Brooklyn)	Democratic	March 4, 1891 – March 3, 1893	52nd	Elected in 1890. Redistricted to the 4th district.	
Joseph C. Hendrix (Brooklyn)	Democratic	March 4, 1893 – March 3, 1895	53rd	Elected in 1892. [data missing]	
Francis H. Wilson (Brooklyn)	Republican	March 4, 1895 – September 30, 1897	54th 55th	Elected in 1894. Re-elected in 1896. Resigned to become Postmaster of Brooklyn.	
Vacant		September 30, 1897 – December 6, 1897	55th		
Edmund H. Driggs (Brooklyn)	Democratic	December 6, 1897 – March 3, 1901	55th 56th	Elected to finish Wilson's term. Re-elected in 1898. [data missing]	
Henry Bristow (Brooklyn)	Republican	March 4, 1901 – March 3, 1903	57th	Elected in 1900. [data missing]	
Charles T. Dunwell (Brooklyn)	Republican	March 3, 1903 – June 12, 1908	58th 59th 60th	Elected in 1902. Re-elected in 1904. Re-elected in 1906. Died.	
Vacant		June 12, 1908 – November 3, 1908	60th		
Otto G. Foelker (Brooklyn)	Republican	November 3, 1908 – March 3, 1911	60th 61st	Elected to finish Dunwell's term. Re-elected in 1908. [data missing]	
James P. Maher (Brooklyn)	Democratic	March 4, 1911 – March 3, 1913	62nd	Elected in 1910. Redistricted to the 5th district.	
Frank E. Wilson (Brooklyn)	Democratic	March 4, 1913 – March 3, 1915	63rd	Redistricted from the 4th district and re-elected in 1912.	
Joseph V. Flynn (Brooklyn)	Democratic	March 4, 1915 – March 3, 1919	64th 65th	Elected in 1914. Re-elected in 1916. [data missing]	
John MacCrate (Brooklyn)	Republican	March 4, 1919 – December 30, 1920	66th	Elected in 1918. Resigned to become justice of the New York Supreme Court.	
Vacant		December 30, 1920 – March 3, 1921	66th		
John Kissel (Brooklyn)	Republican	March 4, 1921 – March 3, 1923	67th	Elected in 1920. Lost re-election.	
George W. Lindsay (Brooklyn)	Democratic	March 4, 1923 – January 3, 1935	68th 69th 70th 71st 72nd 73rd	Elected in 1922. Re-elected in 1924. Re-elected in 1926. Re-elected in 1928. Re-elected in 1930. Re-elected in 1932. Lost renomination.	
Joseph L. Pfeifer (Brooklyn)	Democratic	January 3, 1935 – January 3, 1945	74th 75th 76th 77th 78th	Elected in 1934. Re-elected in 1936. Re-elected in 1938. Re-elected in 1940. Re-elected in 1942. Redistricted to the 8th district.	
Henry J. Latham (Queens)	Republican	January 3, 1945 – January 3, 1953	79th 80th 81st 82nd	Elected in 1944. Re-elected in 1946. Re-elected in 1948. Re-elected in 1950. Redistricted to the 4th district.	
Frank J. Becker (Lynbrook)	Republican	January 3, 1953 – January 3, 1963	83rd 84th 85th 86th 87th	Elected in 1952. Re-elected in 1954. Re-elected in 1956. Re-elected in 1958. Re-elected in 1960. Redistricted to the 5th district.	
Steven Derounian (Roslyn)	Republican	January 3, 1963 – January 3, 1965	88th	Redistricted from the 2nd district and re-elected in 1962. Lost re-election.	
Lester L. Wolff (Great Neck)	Democratic	January 3, 1965 – January 3, 1973	89th 90th 91st 92nd	Elected in 1964. Re-elected in 1966. Re-elected in 1968. Re-elected in 1970. Redistricted to the 6th district.	
Angelo D. Roncallo (Massapequa)	Republican	January 3, 1973 – January 3, 1975	93rd	Elected in 1972. Lost re-election.	
Jerome A. Ambro Jr. (Huntington Station)	Democratic	January 3, 1975 – January 3, 1981	94th 95th 96th	Elected in 1974. Re-elected in 1976. Re-elected in 1978. Lost re-election.	
Gregory W. Carman (Farmingdale)	Republican	January 3, 1981 – January 3, 1983	97th	Elected in 1980. Retired.	
Robert J. Mrazek (Huntington)	Democratic	January 3, 1983 – January 3, 1993	98th 99th 100th 101st 102nd	Elected in 1982. Re-elected in 1984. Re-elected in 1986. Re-elected in 1988. Re-elected in 1990. Retired to the run for U.S. Senator.	
Peter T. King (Seaford)	Republican	January 3, 1993 – January 3, 2013	103rd 104th 105th 106th 107th 108th 109th 110th 111th 112th	Elected in 1992. Re-elected in 1994. Re-elected in 1996. Re-elected in 1998. Re-elected in 2000. Re-elected in 2002. Re-elected in 2004. Re-elected in 2006. Re-elected in 2008. Re-elected in 2010. Redistricted to the 2nd district.	
Peter T. King (Seaford)	Republican	January 3, 1993 – January 3, 2013	103rd 104th 105th 106th 107th 108th 109th 110th 111th 112th	Elected in 1992. Re-elected in 1994. Re-elected in 1996. Re-elected in 1998. Re-elected in 2000. Re-elected in 2002. Re-elected in 2004. Re-elected in 2006. Re-elected in 2008. Re-elected in 2010. Redistricted to the 2nd district.	2003–2013; Parts of Nassau, Suffolk counties
Steve Israel (Huntington)	Democratic	January 3, 2013 – January 3, 2017	113th 114th	Redistricted from the 2nd district and re-elected in 2012. Re-elected in 2014. Retired.	2013–2023; Parts of Nassau, Queens, Suffolk counties
Tom Suozzi (Glen Cove)	Democratic	January 3, 2017 – January 3, 2023	115th 116th 117th	Elected in 2016. Re-elected in 2018. Re-elected in 2020. Retired to run for governor of New York.	2013–2023; Parts of Nassau, Queens, Suffolk counties
George Santos (Queens)	Republican	January 3, 2023 – December 1, 2023	118th	Elected in 2022. Expelled.	2023–2025; Parts of Nassau, Queens counties
Vacant		December 1, 2023 – February 28, 2024	118th		2023–2025; Parts of Nassau, Queens counties
Tom Suozzi (Glen Cove)	Democratic	February 28, 2024 – present	118th 119th	Elected to finish Santos's term. Re-elected in 2024. Re-elected in 2026.	2023–2025; Parts of Nassau, Queens counties
Tom Suozzi (Glen Cove)	Democratic	February 28, 2024 – present	118th 119th	Elected to finish Santos's term. Re-elected in 2024. Re-elected in 2026.	2025–present Parts of Nassau, Queens, and Suffolk counties

== Recent election results ==
In New York State there are numerous parties at various points on the political spectrum. Certain parties will invariably endorse either the Republican or Democratic candidate for every office, hence the state electoral results contain both the party votes, and the final candidate votes (Listed as "Recap").

=== 1996 ===
1996 U.S. House of Representatives election: New York district 3
Party	Candidate	Votes	%	±%
Republican	Peter T. King (incumbent)	127,972	55.3	
Democratic	Dal LaMagna	97,518	42.1	
Right to Life	John J. O'Shea	4,129	1.8	
Liberal	John A. DePrima	1,807	0.8	
Majority		30,454	13.2	
Turnout		231,426	100	

=== 1998 ===
1998 U.S. House of Representatives election: New York district 3
Party	Candidate	Votes	%	±%
Republican	Peter T. King (incumbent)	117,258	64.3	+9.0
Democratic	Kevin N. Langberg	63,628	34.9	−7.2
Liberal	Thomas R. DiLavore	1,497	0.8	+0.0
Majority		53,630	29.4	+16.2
Turnout		182,383	100	−21.2

=== 2000 ===
2000 U.S. House of Representatives election: New York district 3
Party	Candidate	Votes	%	±%
Republican	Peter T. King (incumbent)	143,126	59.5	−4.8
Democratic	Dal LaMagna	95,787	39.8	+4.9
Liberal	Selma Olchin	1,515	0.6	−0.2
Majority		47,339	19.7	−9.7
Turnout		240,428	100	+31.8

=== 2002 ===
2002 U.S. House of Representatives election: New York district 3
Party	Candidate	Votes	%	±%
Republican	Peter T. King (incumbent)	121,537	71.9	+12.4
Democratic	Stuart L. Finz	46,022	27.2	−12.6
Liberal	Janeen DePrima	1,513	0.9	+0.3
Majority		75,515	44.7	+25.0
Turnout		169,072	100	−29.7

=== 2004 ===
2004 U.S. House of Representatives election: New York district 3
Party	Candidate	Votes	%	±%
Republican	Peter T. King (incumbent)	171,259	63.0	−8.9
Democratic	Blair H. Mathies, Jr.	100,737	37.0	+9.8
Majority		70,522	25.9	−18.8
Turnout		271,996	100	+60.9

=== 2006 ===
2006 U.S. House of Representatives election: New York district 3
Party	Candidate	Votes	%	±%
Republican	Peter T. King (incumbent)	101,787	56.0	−7.0
Democratic	Dave Mejias	79,843	44.0	+7.0
Majority		21,944	12.1	−13.8
Turnout		181,630	100	−33.2

=== 2008 ===
2008 U.S. House of Representatives election: New York district 3
Party	Candidate	Votes	%	±%
Republican	Peter T. King (incumbent)	135,648	64.0	+8.0
Democratic	Graham Long	76,918	36.0	−7.0
Turnout		212,566	100	−33.2

=== 2010 ===
2010 U.S. House of Representatives election: New York district 3
Party	Candidate	Votes	%	±%
Republican	Peter T. King (incumbent)	126,142	72.0	+8.0
Democratic	Howard Kudler	48,963	28.0	−8.0
Turnout		175,105	100	−33.2

=== 2012 ===
2012 U.S. House of Representatives election: New York district 3
Party	Candidate	Votes	%
Democratic	Steve Israel	146,271	53.5
Working Families	Steve Israel	6,506	2.4
Independence	Steve Israel	5,103	1.9
Total	Steve Israel (incumbent)	157,880	57.8
Republican	Stephen LaBate	98,614	36.1
Conservative	Stephen LaBate	14,589	5.4
Total	Stephen LaBate	113,203	41.5
Libertarian	Michael McDermott	1,644	0.6
Constitution	Anthony Tolda	367	0.1
Total votes		273,094	100
Democratic gain from Republican			

=== 2014 ===
2014 U.S. House of Representatives election: New York district 3
Party	Candidate	Votes	%
Democratic	Steve Israel	80,393	48.9
Working Families	Steve Israel	5,191	3.2
Independence	Steve Israel	4,448	2.7
Total	Steve Israel (incumbent)	90,032	54.8
Republican	Grant Lally	63,219	38.5
Conservative	Grant Lally	11,050	6.7
Total	Grant Lally	74,269	45.2
Total votes		164,301	100.0
Democratic hold			

=== 2016 ===
2016 U.S. House of Representatives election: New York district 3
Party	Candidate	Votes	%
Democratic	Tom Suozzi	167,758	52.9
Republican	Jack Martins	131,534	41.4
Conservative	Jack Martins	16,134	5.1
Reform	Jack Martins	1,909	0.6
Total	Jack Martins	149,577	47.1
Total votes		317,335	100.0
Democratic hold			

=== 2018 ===
2018 U.S. House of Representatives election: New York district 3
Party	Candidate	Votes	%	±%
Democratic	Tom Suozzi (incumbent)	157,456	59.0	+6.6
Republican	Dan DeBono	109,514	41.0	−6.6
Turnout		266,970	100	+13.2
Democratic hold				

=== 2020 ===
2020 U.S. House of Representatives election: New York district 3
Party	Candidate	Votes	%
Democratic	Tom Suozzi (incumbent)	195,927	52.6
Working Families	Tom Suozzi	9,193	2.5
Independence	Tom Suozzi	3,292	0.9
Total	Tom Suozzi (incumbent)	208,412	55.9
Republican	George Santos	147,437	39.6
Conservative	George Santos	14,470	3.9
Total	George Santos	161,907	43.4
Libertarian	Howard Rabin	2,154	0.5
Total votes		372,473	100.0
Democratic hold			

=== 2022 ===
2022 U.S. House of Representatives election: New York district 3
Party	Candidate	Votes	%
Republican	George Santos	133,859	49.33%
Conservative	George Santos	11,965	4.41%
Total	George Santos	145,824	53.74%
Democratic	Rob Zimmerman	120,045	44.24%
Working Families	Rob Zimmerman	5,359	1.98%
Total	Rob Zimmerman	125,404	46.22%
Total votes		271,331	100%
Republican gain from Democratic			

=== 2024 (special) ===
Following the expulsion of George Santos from Congress on December 1, 2023, Governor Kathy Hochul set the special election date for Tuesday, February 13, 2024.

2024 New York's 3rd congressional district special election
Party	Candidate	Votes	%	±%
Democratic	Tom Suozzi	93,183	53.92	+9.66
Republican	Mazi Melesa Pilip	69,778	40.38	−8.97
Conservative	Mazi Melesa Pilip	9,512	5.50	+1.09
Total	Mazi Melesa Pilip	79,290	45.88	−7.88
Write-in		337	0.20	N/A
Total votes		172,810	100.00	
Democratic gain from Republican				

=== 2024 (regular) ===
2024 New York's 3rd congressional district election
Party	Candidate	Votes	%
Democratic	Tom Suozzi	185,491	51.2
Common Sense Party	Tom Suozzi	2,160	0.6
Total	Tom Suozzi (incumbent)	187,651	51.8
Republican	Mike LiPetri	161,197	44.5
Conservative	Mike LiPetri	13,497	3.7
Total	Mike LiPetri	174,694	48.2
Total votes		362,344	100.0
Democratic hold			

== Historical district boundaries ==
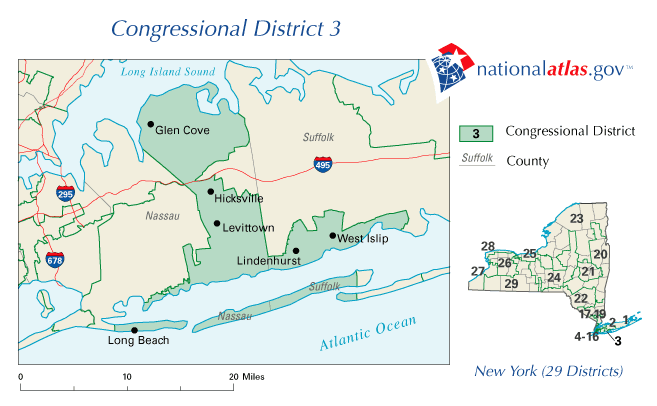
2003–2013

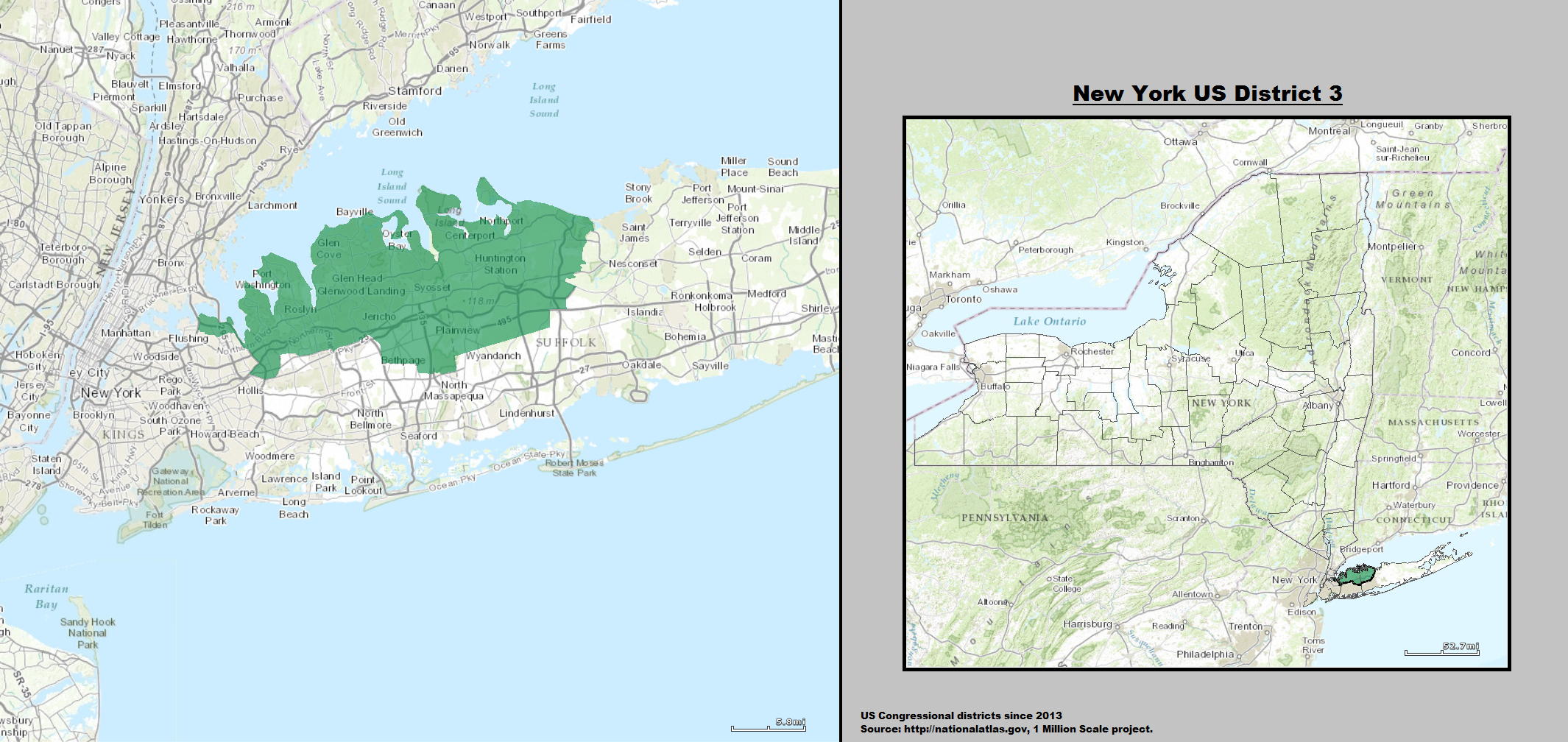
2013–2023

This district historically has been centered in northeast Nassau County, but has added other areas from time to time. In the 1960s the district encompassed the northern half of Nassau County and a small corner of Queens. In the 1970s North Hempstead town was added to the 6th District and the 3rd moved into Huntington in Suffolk County and parts of southeast Nassau County. In the 1980s most of eastern Nassau was added to the 4th District, and the 3rd was composed of northwest Nassau, a narrow corridor along the Long Island Sound, and northwest Suffolk. After the 1992 redistricting the North Shore was transferred to the new 5th District and the 3rd consisted of inland areas of northern and eastern Nassau County, and the Nassau County south shore. An even narrower corridor linked the northwest Nassau and northwest Suffolk portion of the 5th District, leaving most of Oyster Bay in the 3rd. The 2002 remap removed some areas of eastern Nassau but added south shore towns in Suffolk County and the shore areas of northeast Nassau. In 2012, the district moved from the South Shore to the North Shore and re-entered Queens for the first time since the 1960s.

== See also ==
- List of United States congressional districts
- New York's congressional delegations
- New York's congressional districts
