= Matthew C. Paterson =

American lawyer and politician

Matthew Charles Paterson (died January 26, 1846) was an American lawyer and politician from New York.

== Life ==
He graduated A.M. from Columbia College in 1819.

In 1840, he delivered An Address on Primary Education (42 pages) before the Columbia Peithologian Society.

He was New York County District Attorney from June 1844 until his death in January 1846.

== Sources ==
- The New York Civil List compiled by Franklin Benjamin Hough (page 377; Weed, Parsons and Co., 1858)
- Death notice in The Golden Rule (issue of January 31, 1846; page 78)

Legal offices
Preceded by James R. Whiting	New York County District Attorney; 1844–1846	Succeeded by John McKeon
