= Peter Sharpe =

American politician

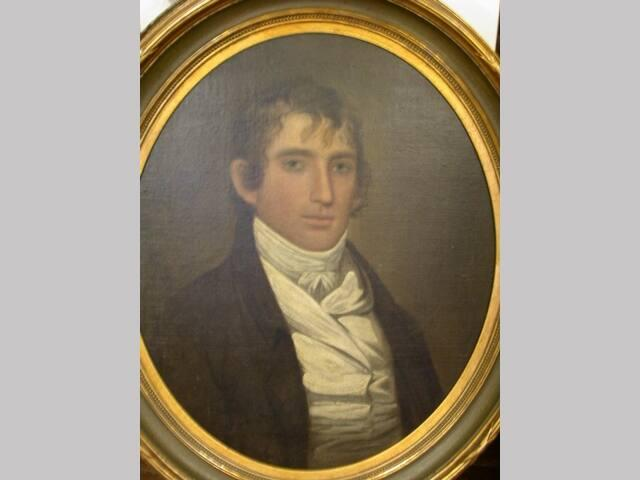
Peter Sharpe (1777-1842)

Peter Sharpe (December 10, 1777 in New York City – August 3, 1842 in Brooklyn, New York) was an American politician who served as a United States representative from New York.

== Life ==
He "was a Maiden-lane whip-maker, of the average intelligence of a mechanic", and was an alderman of New York City.

He was a member from New York County of the New York State Assembly in 1814-15 and from 1816 to 1821, and was speaker in 1820–21. He was a delegate to the New York State Constitutional Convention of 1821.

Credentials of his election to the Seventeenth Congress were issued by the Secretary of State of New York but Sharpe did not claim or take the seat. Cadwallader D. Colden successfully contested Sharpe's election and was seated on December 12, 1821.

Sharpe was elected as an Adams-Clay Democratic-Republican to the 18th United States Congress, holding office from March 4, 1823 to March 3, 1825. He was an unsuccessful candidate for re-election to the 19th United States Congress in 1824.

He died on August 3, 1842, in Brooklyn, New York, and was buried at the New York Marble Cemetery, but later re-interred in the Green-Wood Cemetery in Brooklyn.

== See also ==
- United States House of Representatives elections in New York, 1821
- United States House of Representatives elections in New York, 1822

Political offices
Preceded by John C. Spencer	Speaker of the New York State Assembly; 1820–1821	Succeeded by Samuel B. Romaine
U.S. House of Representatives
Preceded by Jeremiah H. Pierson	Member of the U.S. House of Representatives from New York's 3rd congressional district 1823–1825 with Churchill C. Cambreleng and John J. Morgan	Succeeded by Gulian C. Verplanck, Churchill C. Cambreleng, Jeromus Johnson
