= Jeromus Johnson =

American politician (1775–1846)

Member of the U.S. House of Representatives from New York's 3rd district
- In office March 4, 1825 – March 3, 1829
- Preceded by: Peter Sharpe; John J. Morgan
- Succeeded by: Campbell P. White

Personal details
- Born: November 2, 1775 Wallabout, New York, USA
- Died: September 7, 1846 (aged 70) Goshen, New York, USA
- Party: Jacksonian

Jeromus Johnson (November 2, 1775 – September 7, 1846) was an American merchant and politician from New York. From 1825 to 1829, he served two terms in the U.S. House of Representatives.

== Life ==
He was the son of Maj. Barent Johnson (1740–1782) and Anne (Remsen) Johnson. He attended the public schools, removed to New York City, and engaged in mercantile pursuits. In 1802, he married Mary Carpenter (1782–1863). He was a member of the New York State Assembly in 1822.

=== Congress ===
Johnson was elected as a Jacksonian to the 19th and 20th United States Congresses, holding office from March 4, 1825, to March 3, 1829. He was Chairman of the Committee on Public Expenditures (20th Congress).

=== Later career and death ===
On May 26, 1830, he was appointed an Appraiser of Merchandise for the Port of New York and served until 1840 when he retired from active business and removed to Goshen, the hometown of his wife.

He was buried at a private cemetery on his estate in Goshen.

== Family ==
Mayor of Brooklyn, Jeremiah Johnson (1766–1852), was his brother.

== Sources ==
- United States Congress. "Jeromus Johnson (id: J000152)". Biographical Directory of the United States Congress.
- The New York Civil List compiled by Franklin Benjamin Hough (pages 71f, 198 and 284; Weed, Parsons and Co., 1858)
- The Lifes and Opinions of Benjamin Franklin Butler and Jesse Hoyt by William Lyon Mackenzie (1845; pages 80ff)

U.S. House of Representatives
Preceded by Peter Sharpe, John J. Morgan, Churchill C. Cambreleng	Member of the U.S. House of Representatives from New York's 3rd congressional district 1825–1829 with Churchill C. Cambreleng and Gulian C. Verplanck	Succeeded by Gulian C. Verplanck, Campbell P. White, Churchill C. Cambreleng
