= Gulian C. Verplanck =

American politician

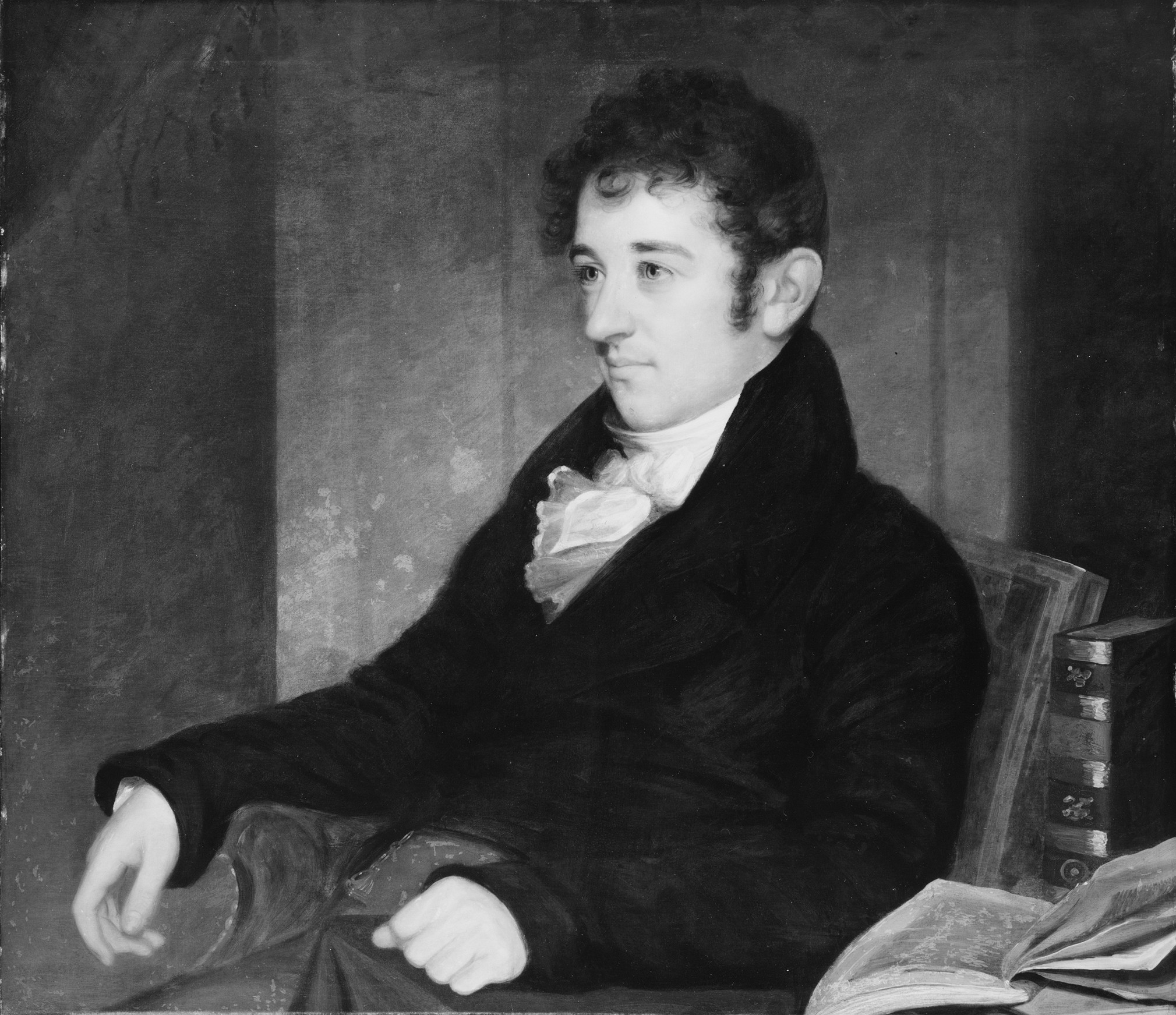
- Portrait of Verplanck by John Wesley Jarvis, ca. 1811

Member of the New York State Senate from the 1st District (Class 3)
- In office January 1, 1838 – 1841
- Preceded by: Charles L. Livingston
- Succeeded by: Isaac L. Varian

Member of the U.S. House of Representatives from New York's 3rd district
- In office March 4, 1825 – March 3, 1833
- Preceded by: Peter Sharpe; John J. Morgan
- Succeeded by: Dudley Selden; Cornelius Van Wyck Lawrence

Member of the New York State Assembly from New York County
- In office July 1, 1820 – December 31, 1823

Personal details
- Born: Gulian Crommelin Verplanck; August 6, 1786 Manhattan, New York, U.S.
- Died: March 18, 1870 (aged 83) Manhattan, New York, U.S.
- Resting place: Trinity Churchyard in Fishkill, New York
- Party: Dem.-Rep./Bucktail (Assembly); Jacksonian (US Congress); Whig (NY Senate)
- Spouse: Mary Elizabeth Fenno (m. 1811; died 1817)
- Children: William Samuel Verplanck; Gulian Verplanck
- Parent(s): Daniel C. Verplanck; Elizabeth Johnson
- Relatives: Samuel Verplanck (grandfather); William Samuel Johnson (grandfather)
- Education: Columbia College

Gulian Crommelin Verplanck (August 6, 1786 – March 18, 1870) was an American attorney, politician, and writer. He was elected to the New York State Assembly and Senate, and later to the United States House of Representatives from New York, where he served as chairman of the influential House Ways and Means Committee.

He served in a number of appointed positions of major institutions in New York: governor of New York Hospital; regent of the University of the State of New York, where in 1858, he became its Vice Chancellor, serving until his death more than a decade later; and President of the Board of Commissioners of Immigration for more than two decades.

Verplanck published articles and poetry in the North American Review, and was counted among the "Knickerbocker group". As a young man, he was among the organizers of the American Academy of the Fine Arts in New York City, which opened in 1802. It was intended to promote the study of classical art and help establish the city as a center of art. With tastes changing, it closed in 1840.

== Early life ==
Gulian Crommelin Verplanck was born on August 6, 1786, in the family mansion at 3 Wall Street in New York City. He was the son of Elizabeth Johnson (d. 1789) and Congressman Daniel C. Verplanck (1762–1834), descendant of Dutch colonists. In 1789, his widowed father remarried to Ann Walton, and thereafter Gulian was brought up by his paternal grandmother, Judith (née Crommelin) Verplanck.

His paternal grandfather was Samuel Verplanck and his great-uncle was Gulian Verplanck, two-time Speaker of the New York State Assembly. His maternal grandfather was William Samuel Johnson, the 3rd President of Columbia College and a U.S. Senator from Connecticut, and his great-grandfather was Samuel Johnson, the 1st President of Kings College.

In 1801, he graduated from Columbia College with a B.A. and then proceeded to "read law" with Edward Livingston.

== Career ==
Verplanck was admitted to the bar in 1807, and had a law office at 51 Wall Street. In 1808, he was the first secretary for the newly formed Washington Benevolent Society, a Federalist-affiliated club that engaged in political activity and electioneering. An 1809 speech in front of the club members, which was then meeting at the old North Dutch Church, was considered "his entrance into public life." In 1811, he was fined $200 (~$3,870 in 2025) for inciting a riot at a Columbia College commencement at Trinity Church when the presiding officer declined to confer a degree upon a student who had made political statements with which the faculty disagreed. Mayor DeWitt Clinton presided over the trial, and as he was seeking Federalist support against President James Madison in the upcoming election, it was thought that this may have influenced his conduct of the trial.

=== Political career ===
Verplanck was elected as a member of the New York State Assembly in 1820–21, 1822 and 1823. Although he had earlier been a Federalist, he was elected as a Jacksonian to the 19th, 20th, and as a Democrat to the 21st and 22nd United States Congresses, holding office from March 4, 1825, to March 3, 1833. He was Chairman of the Committee on Ways and Means (22nd Congress). While there one of his leading acts was to secure the extension of the period of copyrights. In 1833, when President Andrew Jackson began his quest to suppress the Second Bank of the United States, Verplanck left the Democrats.

In April 1834, at the first popular election for Mayor of New York City, Verplanck was the candidate of the emerging Whig Party but was narrowly defeated (sources range from 181 to 213 votes) by Cornelius Van Wyck Lawrence. Afterwards Verplanck kept his own counsel in politics and supported William Henry Harrison (Whig), James K. Polk (Dem.), Zachary Taylor (Whig) and James Buchanan (Dem.) for president, remaining a Democrat thereafter.

Verplanck was a member of the New York State Senate (1st D.) from 1838 to 1841, sitting in the 61st, 62nd, 63rd and 64th New York State Legislatures.

He was appointed as the President of the New York State Board of Commissioners of Emigration, serving from 1846 until his death in 1870. The State Emigrant Hospital on Ward's Island, which he helped to establish in this capacity, was eventually renamed in his honor. He was a delegate to the New York State Constitutional Convention of 1867–68.

=== Writing career ===
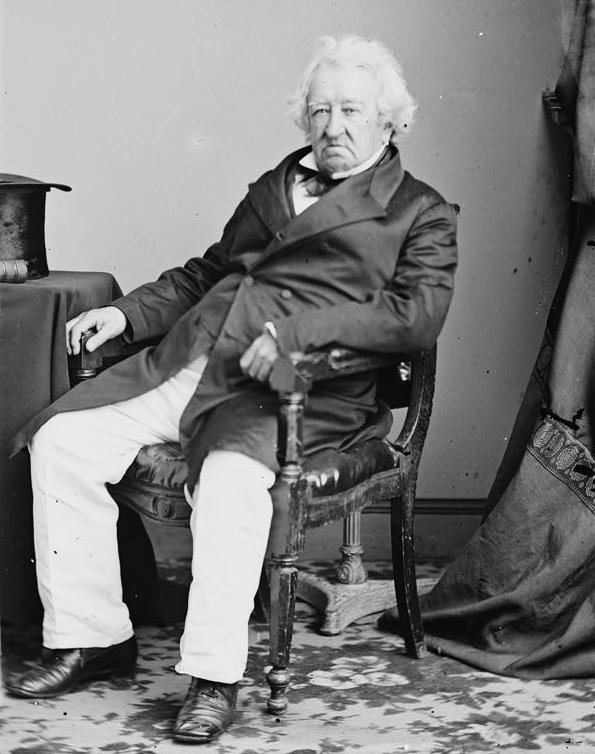
Photograph of Verplanck taken between 1855 and 1865

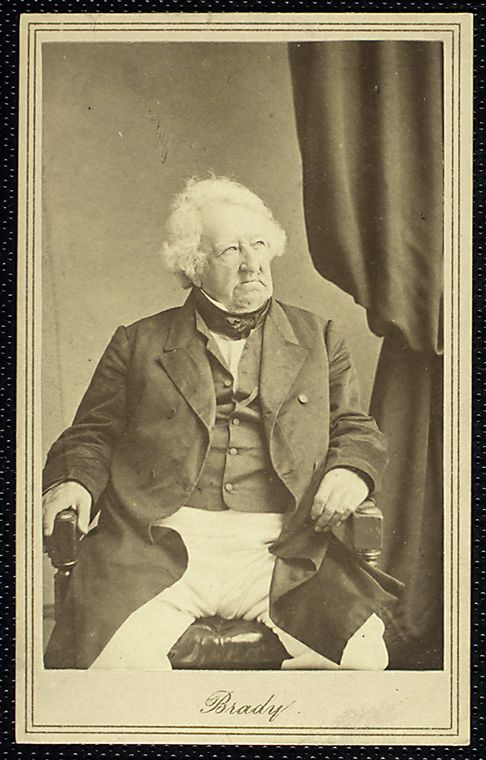
Portrait of Verplanck by Mathew Brady

In his literary life, Verplanck was a contributor to the North American Review, perhaps best known for his denunciation of Knickerbocker's History of New York, by Washington Irving. In 1819, he wrote verse satires against Dewitt Clinton; these were generally known as The Bucktail Bards. On the request of Harper Brothers, he edited a set of Shakespeare.

Through his writing, he was considered part of the so-called "Knickerbocker group", which included Irving, William Cullen Bryant, James Kirke Paulding, Fitz-Greene Halleck, Joseph Rodman Drake, Robert Charles Sands, Lydia Maria Child, and Nathaniel Parker Willis.

== Personal life ==
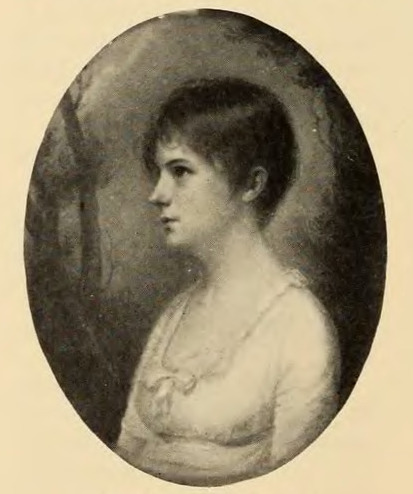
Eliza Fenno Verplanck, portrait by Edward Greene Malbone

On October 2, 1811, he married Mary Elizabeth Fenno, a daughter of Mary Curtis and John Fenno (1751–1798), a Federalist Party editor and publisher of Gazette of the United States. One of her sisters married Josiah Ogden Hoffman (1766–1837), the New York Attorney General, and another married John Rodman (1775–1847), the New York County District Attorney. Together, Verplanck and Mary Eliza had two sons:

- William Samuel Verplanck (1812–1885), who married Anna Biddle Newlin (1816–1883), daughter of Robert Newlin (1770–1840) and niece of Maj. Gen. Jacob Brown, on November 17, 1837.
- Gulian Verplanck (1815–1845), who died unmarried

== Death and burial ==
While traveling abroad, Mary Verplanck died in 1817 in Paris. She was buried there at the Père Lachaise Cemetery. Verplanck died at his residence in 14th Street in New York City on March 18, 1870. He was buried at the Trinity Churchyard in Fishkill, New York.

=== Descendants ===
Through his eldest son William, Verplanck was the grandfather of:

- Eliza Fenmo Verplanck (b. 1838), who married Benjamin Richards;
- Mary Newlin Verplanck (1840–1881), who married her cousin Samuel William Johnson (1830–1909);
- Robert Newlin Verplanck (1842–1908), who married Katharine Van Bensehoten (b. 1857);
- Daniel Crommelin Verplanck (1845–1854);
- Anna Verplanck (1846–1891), who married Samuel Hicks Clapp;
- Jeannette Verplanck (b. 1849), who married Theodore M. Etting;
- Gelyna Verplanck (b. 1852), who married Louis Fitzgerald;
- William Edward Verplanck (1856–1928), who married Virginia Everett Darby.

Verplanck is the ancestor of William Samuel Verplanck, Jr. (1916–2002), a psychologist who conducted a series of significant experiments in the fields of ethology, experimental psychology, and especially in the field of radical behaviorism.

=== Memberships and organizations ===
Verplanck spent the greater part of his life in New York City and in 1820, he was elected a member of the American Antiquarian Society. He served as a professor at the General Theological Seminary in New York City from 1821 to 1824. He was one of the governors of the New York Hospital from 1823 to 1865. In 1826, he was elected a regent of the University of the State of New York, and in 1858 became its Vice Chancellor, remaining in office until his death. Verplanck was one of the founding members of the Century Club and was its president at the time of his death.

== See also ==
- Mount Gulian

U.S. House of Representatives
Preceded by Peter Sharpe, John J. Morgan, Churchill C. Cambreleng	Member of the U.S. House of Representatives from New York's 3rd congressional district 1825–1833 with Churchill C. Cambreleng 1825-33, Jeromus Johnson 1825-29 and Campbell P. White 1829-33	Succeeded by Dudley Selden, Campbell P. White, Cornelius Van Wyck Lawrence, Churchill C. Cambreleng
New York State Senate
Preceded by Charles L. Livingston	New York State Senate; First District (Class 3); 1838–1841	Succeeded by Isaac L. Varian
