= Dudley Selden =

American politician (1794–1855)

Dudley Selden (1794 – November 7, 1855 Paris, France) was an American lawyer and politician from New York. From 1833 to 1834, he served part of one term in the U.S. House of Representatives.

== Life ==
=== Family ===
He was a son of Joseph Dudley Selden (1764–1837) and Ethelinda Colt (1771–1864). He married Mary Augusta Packard (1803–1868), and had a daughter Maria Louisa Selden who married William Rogers Morgan.

=== Early career ===
Selden graduated from Union College, Schenectady, New York, in 1819. He studied law. He was admitted to the bar and commenced the practice of his profession in New York City in 1831.

=== Political career ===
He was a member of the New York State Assembly in 1831.

==== Congress ====
Selden was elected as a Jacksonian to the 23rd United States Congress and served from March 4, 1833, to July 1, 1834, when he resigned.

=== Death and burial ===
He died on November 7, 1855, in Paris, France and was buried at Green-Wood Cemetery in Brooklyn, New York.

== Sources ==
- United States Congress. "Dudley Selden (id: S000233)". Biographical Directory of the United States Congress.
- Selden Ancestry: A Family History, by Seophie Selden Rogers, Elizabeth Selden Lane, and Edwin Van Deusen Selden. Published Oil City, PA by E. Van D Selden.
- Samuel Colt: Arms, Art, and Invention by Herbert G. Houze, Carolyn C. Cooper, Elizabeth Mankin Kornhauser (Yale University Press, 2006, ISBN 0-300-11133-9, ISBN 978-0-300-11133-0 ; page 246) [gives birthyear 1794, but shows Joseph Dudley Selden in a place which suggests his marriage to another Ethelinda of the next generation]

U.S. House of Representatives
Preceded by Churchill C. Cambreleng; Campbell P. White; Gulian C. Verplanck	Member of the U.S. House of Representatives from New York's 3rd congressional district 1833–1834 with Churchill C. Cambreleng, Campbell P. White, and Cornelius Lawrence	Succeeded by Churchill C. Cambreleng; Campbell P. White; John J. Morgan; Charles G. Ferris
