= Ogden Hoffman =

American politician

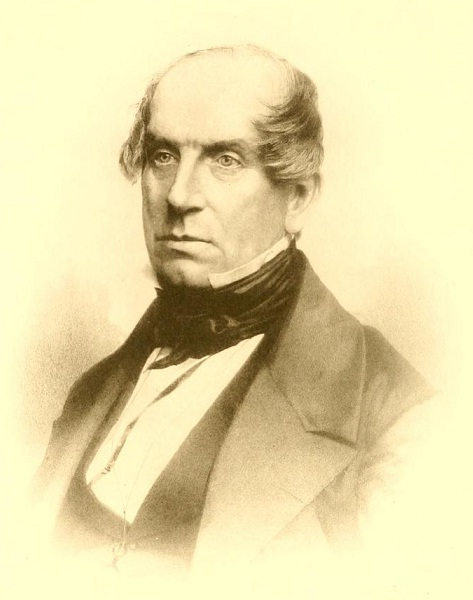

25th Attorney General of New York
- In office January 1, 1854 – December 31, 1855
- Governor: Horatio Seymour; Myron H. Clark
- Preceded by: Gardner Stow
- Succeeded by: Stephen B. Cushing

United States Attorney for the Southern District of New York
- In office 1841–1845
- President: William Henry Harrison; John Tyler
- Preceded by: Benjamin F. Butler
- Succeeded by: Benjamin F. Butler

Member of the U.S. House of Representatives from New York's 3rd district
- In office 1837–1841 Serving with Edward Curtis; Churchill C. Cambreleng (1837–39); Ely Moore (1837–39); James Monroe (1839–41); Moses H. Grinnell (1839–41)
- Preceded by: Gideon Lee; John McKeon
- Succeeded by: Charles G. Ferris; Fernando Wood; James I. Roosevelt; John McKeon

New York County District Attorney
- In office 1829–1835
- Preceded by: Hugh Maxwell
- Succeeded by: Thomas Phoenix

Personal details
- Born: Ogden Hoffman; May 3, 1793 New York City, U.S.
- Died: May 1, 1856 (aged 62) New York City, U.S.
- Resting place: St. Mark's Church in-the-Bowery
- Party: Democratic Party; Whig
- Spouse(s): Emily Burrall; Virginia Southard
- Children: 5, including Ogden Jr.
- Parent(s): Josiah Ogden Hoffman; Mary Colden
- Education: Columbia College

Ogden Hoffman (October 13, 1794 – May 1, 1856) was a 19th-century American lawyer and politician who for two terms was in the United States House of Representatives from 1837 to 1841.

== Life ==
Ogden Hoffman was born on October 13, 1794, the son of New York Attorney General Josiah Ogden Hoffman (1766–1837) and Mary (Colden) Hoffman. He pursued classical studies and graduated from Columbia College in 1812.

== Career ==
He served for three years in the Navy and was warranted a midshipman in 1814. He took part in the War of 1812 and the Second Barbary War as a crew member on the USS President, and was taken prisoner when the President was captured in 1814.

After leaving the navy he studied law under his father, was admitted to the bar in 1818, and commenced practice in Goshen, New York.

=== Political career ===
Hoffman was District Attorney of Orange County from May 1823 to January 1826, and a member of the New York State Assembly (Orange Co.) in 1826. He then returned to New York City and there practiced law in partnership with Hugh Maxwell, who was New York County District Attorney.

Hoffman was again a member of the New York State Assembly (New York Co.) in 1828; and was New York County District Attorney from 1829 to 1835.

He disagreed with the Jackson administration over the need for a federally chartered central bank, and abandoned Tammany Hall and the Democratic Party for the Whigs after Jackson's decision not to re-charter the Second Bank of the United States.

In 1836, Hoffman defended Richard P. Robinson at his trial for the murder of Helen Jewett and got his client acquitted.

==== Congress ====
Hoffman was elected as a Whig to the 25th and 26th United States Congresses, holding office from March 4, 1837, to March 3, 1841.

==== Later political offices ====
He was United States Attorney for the Southern District of New York from 1841 to 1845. He later was New York Attorney General from 1854 to 1855, elected on the Whig ticket at the New York state election, 1853.

== Personal life ==
On June 27, 1819, he married Emily Burrall, daughter of Charles Burrall. Together, they had two children:

- Charles Burrall Hoffman (1821–1892), who married Harriet Bronson Willett, granddaughter of Dr. Isaac Bronson.
- Ogden Hoffman, Jr. (1822–1891), who served as a federal judge in California for more than 40 years.

In November 1838, he married Virginia Southard (d. 1886), daughter of Samuel Lewis Southard, who was a U.S. Senator, Secretary of the Navy, and the tenth Governor of New Jersey. Together, they had three children:

- Samuel Southard Hoffman (b. 1839), who married Sarah Acklen
- Mary Colden Hoffman (b. 1840)
- Virginia Southard Hoffman (b. 1842)

He died on May 1, 1856, at his home on Ninth Street in New York City, of "congestion of the lungs." He was buried at St. Mark's Church in-the-Bowery.

Legal offices
Preceded by Hugh Maxwell	New York County District Attorney; 1829–1835	Succeeded by Thomas Phoenix
U.S. House of Representatives
Preceded by Churchill C. Cambreleng, Gideon Lee, Ely Moore, John McKeon	Member of the U.S. House of Representatives from New York's 3rd congressional district 1837–1841 with Churchill C. Cambreleng 1837–39, Ely Moore 1837–39, Edward Curtis 1837–41, James Monroe 1839–41 and Moses H. Grinnell 1839–41	Succeeded by Charles G. Ferris, Fernando Wood, James I. Roosevelt, John McKeon
Legal offices
Preceded by Benjamin F. Butler	U.S. Attorney for the Southern District of New York; 1841–1845	Succeeded by Benjamin F. Butler
Preceded by Gardner Stow	New York Attorney General; 1854–1855	Succeeded by Stephen B. Cushing
