= Jacob Tyson =

American politician

Member of the U.S. House of Representatives from New York's 2nd district
- In office March 4, 1823 – March 3, 1825
- Preceded by: Churchill C. Cambreleng; John J. Morgan
- Succeeded by: Joshua Sands

Member of the New York State Senate from the 1st district
- In office January 1, 1828 – December 31, 1828
- Preceded by: Cadwallader D. Colden
- Succeeded by: Stephen Allen

Personal details
- Born: October 8, 1773 Staten Island, Province of New York, British America
- Died: July 16, 1848 (aged 74) Staten Island, New York, U.S.
- Party: Crawford

Jacob Tyson (October 8, 1773 – July 16, 1848) was an American lawyer and politician from New York.

== Life ==
Tyson attended public school in his youth. He studied law, was admitted to the bar, and practiced law. He was Supervisor of the Town of Castleton, Staten Island from 1811 to 1821. He was First Judge of the Richmond County Court from 1822 to 1840.

Tyson was elected as a Crawford Democratic-Republican to the 18th United States Congress, holding office from March 4, 1823, to March 3, 1825. He was a member of the New York State Senate in 1828.

He was buried at the Reformed Protestant Dutch Church Cemetery in Port Richmond, Staten Island.

== Sources ==
- United States Congress. "Jacob Tyson (id: T000453)". Biographical Directory of the United States Congress.
- The New York Civil List compiled by Franklin Benjamin Hough (pages 71, 127, 146 and 364; Weed, Parsons and Co., 1858)

U.S. House of Representatives
| Preceded by Churchill C. Cambreleng; John J. Morgan | Member of the U.S. House of Representatives from New York's 2nd congressional district 1823–1825 | Succeeded by Joshua Sands |
New York State Senate
| Preceded by Cadwallader D. Colden | New York State Senate; First District (Class 2); 1828 | Succeeded by Stephen Allen |
