= William Samuel Verplanck Jr. =

American psychologist

William Samuel Verplanck Junior (January 16, 1916 in Plainfield, New Jersey – September 30, 2002 in Knoxville, Tennessee) was an American psychologist. He conducted a series of significant experiments in the fields of ethology, experimental psychology, and especially in the field of radical behaviorism. After compiling a review of the writings and research of B.F. Skinner for the 1950 Dartmouth conference, culminating in the publication of Modern Learning Theory, Verplanck adopted the psychological and philosophical stance of Interbehaviorism - a position which he maintained throughout the remainder of his career.

== Written works ==
- Verplanck, W.S. (1942) The development of discrimination in a simple locomotor habit. Journal of Experimental Psychology, 31, 441–464.
- Berry, R.N., Verplanck, W.S., and Graham, C.H. (1943) The reversal of discrimination in a simple running habit. Journal of Experimental Psychology, 32, 325–334.
- Verplanck, W.S. (1946) The effects of paredrine on night vision test performance. (Bur. Med. Surg., 1944; Publ. Bd., N. 23049) Washington, D.C.: U.S. Dept. Commerce, 14.
- Verplanck, W.S. (1946) Comparative study of adaptometers. (Bur. Med. Surg., 1942, Publ. Bd. No. 23050) Washington, D.C.: U.S. Dept. Commerce, 34.
- Verplanck, W.S. (1946) Night vision testing on members of crew of the U.S.S. New Jersey (Bur. Med. Surg., 1943; Publ. Bd. No. 23072) Washington, D.C.: U.S. Dept. Commerce, 9.
