= Cornelius Lawrence =

American politician

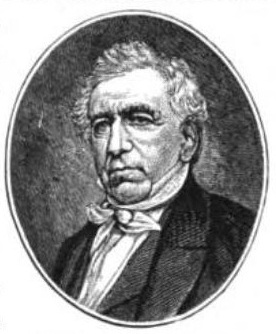
- From Volume 3 of 1896's History of the City of New York: Its Origin, Rise and Progress

Collector of the Port of New York
- In office 1845–1849
- Preceded by: Cornelius P. Van Ness
- Succeeded by: Hugh Maxwell

62nd Mayor of New York City
- In office 1834–1837
- Preceded by: Gideon Lee
- Succeeded by: Aaron Clark

Member of the U.S. House of Representatives from New York's 3rd district
- In office March 4, 1833 – May 14, 1834
- Preceded by: Seat added
- Succeeded by: Charles G. Ferris

Personal details
- Born: Cornelius Van Wyck Lawrence; February 28, 1791 Flushing, New York, U.S.
- Died: February 20, 1861 (aged 69) Flushing, New York, U.S.
- Resting place: Lawrence Cemetery, Bayside, New York
- Party: Democratic-Republican; Jacksonian; Democratic
- Spouse: Lydia A. Lawrence
- Profession: Merchant businessman

Cornelius Van Wyck Lawrence (February 28, 1791 – February 20, 1861) was an American politician from New York. He became the first popularly elected mayor of New York City after the law was changed in 1834. He also served briefly as a member of the U.S. House of Representatives.

== Early life ==
Lawrence was born in Flushing, New York, on February 28, 1791. He was a cousin of Effingham Lawrence and was a descendant of John Lawrence and John Bowne, both Quakers and pioneer English settlers of Queens.

Lawrence attended the public schools and worked on his father's farm.

=== Business career ===
He moved to New York City in 1812 to embark on a business career, first at the Shotwell, Hicks & Co. auctioneering firm, and later as a partner in the wholesale dry goods firm of Hicks, Lawrence & Co.

== Career ==
Lawrence was elected as a Jacksonian to the Twenty-third Congress, serving from March 4, 1833, to May 14, 1834, when he resigned, becoming mayor of New York (1834–1837). He also served as director in several banks and trust companies and, was president of the Bank of the State of New York for more than 20 years. From 1845 to 1849, Lawrence served as Collector of the Port of New York.

== Personal life ==
He had a son, James Ogden Lawrence (died August 1, 1904).

== Death and burial ==
Lawrence died in Flushing (the same place he was born in) on February 20, 1861, 8 days shy of his 70th birthday. He was interred in the family burying ground in Bayside, New York.

U.S. House of Representatives
Preceded by Churchill C. Cambreleng; Campbell P. White; Gulian C. Verplanck	Member of the U.S. House of Representatives from New York's 3rd congressional district 1833–1834 with Churchill C. Cambreleng, Campbell P. White, and Dudley Selden	Succeeded by Churchill C. Cambreleng; Campbell P. White; John J. Morgan; Charles G. Ferris
Government offices
Preceded by Cornelius P. Van Ness	Collector of the Port of New York; 1845–1849	Succeeded by Hugh Maxwell
