= Edward Curtis (politician) =

American politician

Collector of the Port of New York
- In office 1841–1844
- Preceded by: John J. Morgan
- Succeeded by: Cornelius P. Van Ness

Chairman of the United States House Committee on Commerce
- In office 1839–1841

Member of the U.S. House of Representatives from New York's 3rd district
- In office March 4, 1837 – March 3, 1841
- Preceded by: Gideon Lee
- Succeeded by: Fernando Wood

Personal details
- Born: October 25, 1801 Windsor, Vermont
- Died: August 2, 1856 (aged 54) New York City, New York
- Party: Whig
- Education: Union College

Edward Curtis (October 25, 1801 in Windsor, Vermont – August 2, 1856) was a representative from New York for two terms, March 4, 1837, through March 3, 1841. He served as collector of the Port of New York beginning on March 23, 1841 until July 7, 1844.

== Education and career ==
He attended Phillips Academy, Andover, and graduated from Union College in Schenectady, in 1823. He studied law and was admitted to the bar in 1824. He began practice in New York City along with his brother George Curtis. The two formed a partnership with Judge Daniel B. Talmadge.

In 1834 Curtis became a member of the common council from the Third Ward of New York City. He was voted president of the board of assistant aldermen as a representative of the Whig Party (United States). His opponent in this political contest was James R. Whiting of the Democratic Party (United States).

He was elected to the Twenty-fifth Congress and Twenty-sixth Congress, (March 4, 1837 and March 3, 1841), representing New York's 3rd congressional district. He was chosen chairman of the Committee of Commerce. Curtis was not a candidate for renomination.

He was appointed Collector of the Port of New York by William Henry Harrison, and served until July 7, 1844. Curtis was removed as collector by John Tyler. Afterward he resumed the practice of law in Washington, D.C..

== Death ==
He died in New York City on August 2, 1856, following a lingering illness. His place of burial is unknown.

U.S. House of Representatives
Preceded by Gideon Lee	Member of the U.S. House of Representatives from New York's 3rd congressional district 1837–1841	Succeeded by Fernando Wood
Government offices
Preceded by John J. Morgan	Collector of the Port of New York; 1841–1844	Succeeded by Cornelius P. Van Ness
