= John McKeon =

American politician (1808–1883)

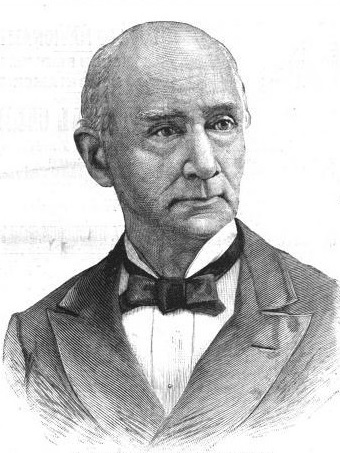

United States Attorney for the Southern District of New York
- In office July 1854 – January 1858
- President: Franklin Pierce
- Preceded by: Charles O'Conor
- Succeeded by: Theodore Sedgwick

District Attorney of New York County
- In office January 1, 1882 – November 22, 1883
- Preceded by: Daniel G. Rollins
- Succeeded by: John Vincent (Acting)
- In office February 6, 1846 – December 31, 1850
- Preceded by: Matthew C. Paterson
- Succeeded by: N. Bowditch Blunt

Member of the U.S. House of Representatives from New York's 3rd district
- In office March 4, 1841 – March 3, 1843
- Preceded by: Ogden Hoffman
- Succeeded by: Jonas P. Phoenix
- In office March 4, 1835 – March 3, 1837
- Preceded by: Charles G. Ferris
- Succeeded by: Ogden Hoffman

Member of the New York State Assembly from New York County
- In office 1832–1834

Personal details
- Born: March 29, 1808 Albany, New York, U.S.
- Died: November 22, 1883 (aged 75) New York City, New York, U.S.
- Party: Democratic
- Other political affiliations: Jacksonian
- Education: Columbia College

John McKeon (March 29, 1808, Albany, New York – November 22, 1883, New York City) was an American lawyer and politician from New York. From 1835 to 1837, and 1841 to 1843, he served two non-consecutive terms in the U.S. House of Representatives as Jacksonian.

== Life ==
He was the son of Capt. James McKeon who fought in the War of 1812. He graduated from the law department of Columbia College in 1828, where he was a member of the Philolexian Society, was admitted to the bar, and commenced practice in New York City.

=== Political career ===
McKeon was a representative in the New York State Assembly from 1832 to 1834.

=== Congress ===
He was elected as a Jacksonian to the 24th United States Congress, serving from March 4, 1835, to March 3, 1837, but was defeated for re-election. He was elected as a Democrat to the 27th United States Congress, serving from March 4, 1841, to March 3, 1843, but was again defeated for re-election.

=== Later career ===
In February 1846, he was appointed New York County District Attorney and, when the office became elective under the State Constitution of 1846, was elected in May 1847 to succeed himself. He remained in office until the end of 1850 when his term expired. In this office, he secured the conviction of Madame Restell.

He was appointed by President Franklin Pierce United States Attorney for the Southern District of New York, and served from July 10, 1854, to January 7, 1858. While holding this office, he prosecuted a number of important cases. Among them were the attempt to enlist men to serve in the British Army during the Crimean War, and the seizure of the filibustering ship "Northern Light."

He was again New York County D.A. from 1882 until his death in office.

=== Death ===
He died at his residence at 44, West 37th Street, and was buried in a family vault under the old St. Patrick's Cathedral on Mott Street in New York City.

U.S. House of Representatives
| Preceded by Charles G. Ferris | Member of the U.S. House of Representatives from New York's 3rd congressional district 1835–1837 | Succeeded by Ogden Hoffman |
| Preceded by Ogden Hoffman | Member of the U.S. House of Representatives from New York's 3rd congressional district 1841–1843 | Succeeded by Jonas P. Phoenix |
Legal offices
| Preceded by Matthew C. Paterson | District Attorney of New York County; 1846–1850 | Succeeded by N. Bowditch Blunt |
| Preceded by Charles O'Conor | United States Attorney for the Southern District of New York; 1854–1858 | Succeeded by Theodore Sedgwick |
| Preceded by Daniel G. Rollins | District Attorney of New York County; 1882–1883 | Succeeded by John Vincent; Acting |
