= Knickerbocker (surname) =

Knickerbocker, also spelled Knikkerbakker, Knikkerbacker, and Knickerbacker, is a Dutch surname that dates back to the early settlers of New Netherland that was popularized by Washington Irving in 1809 when he published his satirical A History of New York under the pseudonym "Diedrich Knickerbocker". The name was also a term for Manhattan's aristocracy "in the early days" and became a general term, now obsolete, for a New Yorker. The term is also used to refer to the Anglo-Dutch "old line" families of New York City, as opposed to New England "Yankee" interlopers and other newcomers.

== Notable people with the surname ==
- Austin Knickerbocker (1918–1997), American professional baseball player
- Bill Knickerbocker (1911–1963), American professional baseball player
- Brianna Knickerbocker (born 1982), American voice actress
- David Buel Knickerbacker (1833–1894), 3rd Protestant Episcopal bishop of the diocese of Indiana
- Harmen Jansen Knickerbocker (c. 1650–c. 1720), Dutch colonist in New Netherland (New York)
- Herman Knickerbocker (1779–1855), American politician
- Hubert Renfro Knickerbocker (1898–1949), American writer and journalist
- I. B. Knickerbocker (1864–1954) American politician
- Jerry Knickerbocker (born 1943), American politician
- Kristina Knickerbocker (born 1990), American politician
- Stuart J. Knickerbocker (1925–2019), American animator and magazine cartoonist

== Pen name ==
- Cholly Knickerbocker, used by a series of society columnists writing for the New York American and the New York Journal-American
- Suzy Knickerbocker, used by American society columnist Aileen Mehle

== Fictional characters ==
- Diedrich Knickerbocker, a character created by Washington Irving
