= David Jamison (politician) =

Scottish-American judge and official

Recorder of New York City
- In office June 10, 1712 – June 1724
- Governor: Robert Hunter; William Burnet
- Preceded by: May Bickley
- Succeeded by: Francis Harison

Attorney General of the Province of New York
- In office June 10, 1712 – July 1721
- Governor: Robert Hunter; William Burnet
- Preceded by: May Bickley
- Succeeded by: James Alexander

Chief Justice of the Province of New Jersey
- In office 1711 – November 1723
- Governor: Robert Hunter; William Burnet

Personal details
- Born: 1660 Linlithgow, Scotland
- Died: July 25, 1739 (aged 78–79) New York City, British America
- Spouses: Maria Hardenbrook (m. 1692, died) Johanna Meech (m. 1703)
- Relations: David Johnston (grandson)

David Jamison (1660 – July 25, 1739) was a Scottish-American lawyer, judge, and provincial official in the Province of New York and New Jersey.

== Early life ==
Jamison was born in Linlithgow, Scotland in 1660, and likely attended college there. Little is known about his parentage or early life.

He was a member of the religious organization known as the "Sweet Singers" (or Covenanters), which defied Anglican orthodoxy and the restored Stuart monarchy. Jamison was arrested for burning a bible, then tried and sentenced to be hanged, however, on August 7, 1685, the King's Privy Council ordered the sentence commuted to exile. Jamison was required to serve an indenture of four years in America to cover the cost of his transportation. He was bound to George Lockhart who assigned him to Rev. Clarke, the chaplain of Fort James, which was under the control of Thomas Dongan, 2nd Earl of Limerick, the royal governor of New York. Due to Jamison's education, the citizens arranged to purchase his time and set him up to teach a Latin school in the city.

== Career ==
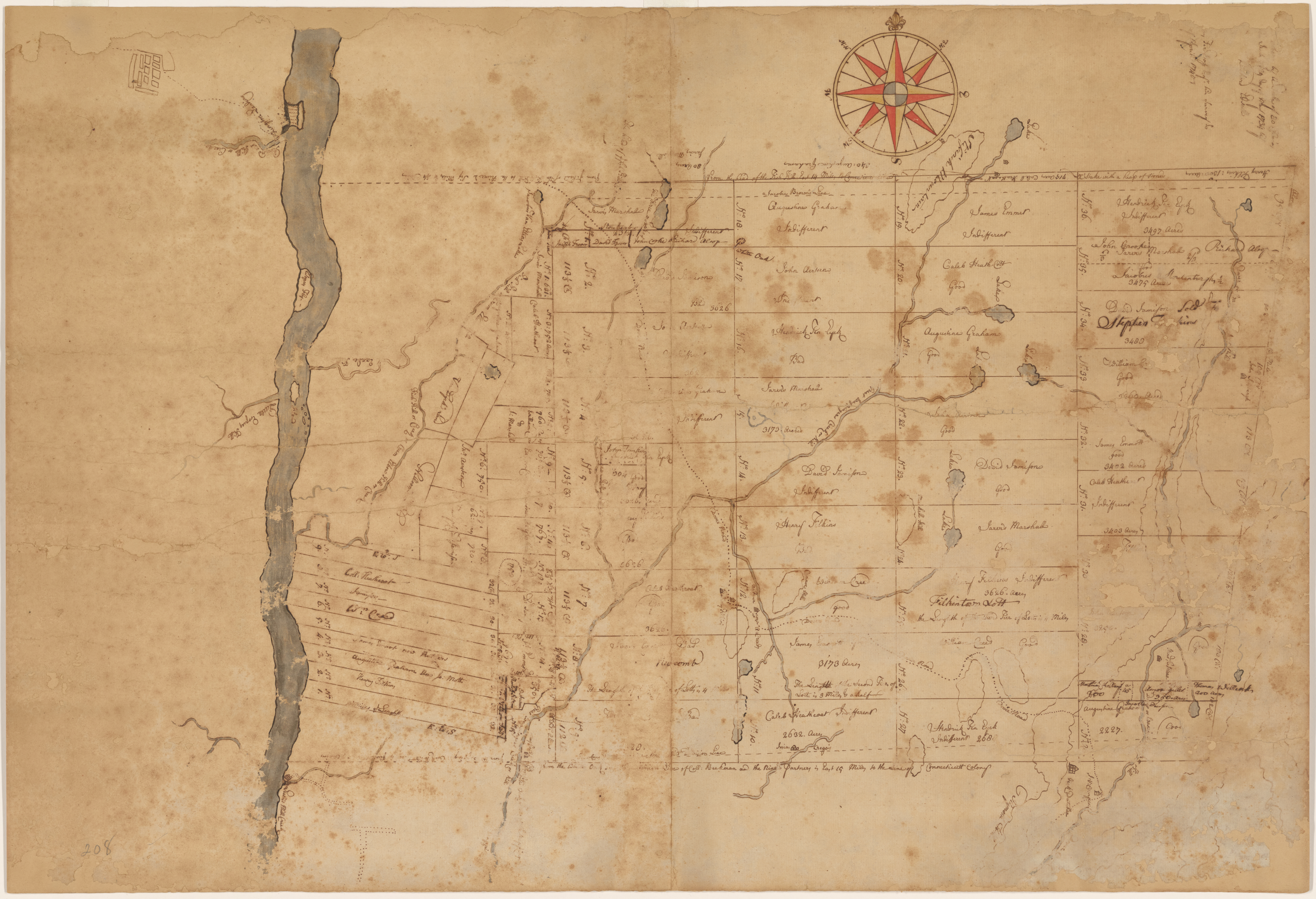
Great Nine Partners Patent.

On April 15, 1691, Jamison was appointed Deputy Secretary and Clerk of the council and began his legal studies. He then served as Clerk of the Court and was part of the group, along with Nicholas Bayard (nephew of Peter Stuyvesant), that tried Jacob Leisler (best known for Leisler's Rebellion following the English Revolution of 1688). In April 1698, when the Earl of Bellomont arrived in New York as Governor, Jamison was dismissed as Clerk. By October 6, 1698, Jamison was admitted to the New York bar and was an active member of the New York Bar Association (which was formed in 1709).

A favorite of Gov. Robert Hunter, Jamison was appointed Chief Justice of New Jersey in 1711. As Chief Justice, he gave "an opinion on the application of the Acts of Trade to the Commerce between New York and New Jersey." While serving as Chief Justice, he replaced May Bickley to become acting Attorney General of New York on June 10, 1712. Bickley, who was removed from office following the prosecutions in the New York Slave Revolt of 1712, held the office of Attorney General pending the return of John Rayner, as did Jamison. Rayner died before returning to the Province, and thereafter Jamison formally received his commission on January 22, 1720. During this time, Jamison was a member of the Governor's Council and served as Recorder of New York City (from 1712 to 1725). Jamison was removed from his post as Chief Justice upon the request of the New Jersey General Assembly by Gov. William Burnet of a resident Chief Justice.

In 1721, he returned to private practice after James Alexander was appointed Attorney General of the Province. Jamison served as counsel in many of the most important cases before the courts, and "was particularly noted for his bravery and character in defending those prosecuted on religious grounds."

=== Land patents ===
On June 25, 1696, along with William Nicholls, John Harrison and others, he obtained a patent for an extensive tract of land, including present day Harrison in Westchester County, New York. On May 27, 1697, as one of nine partners in a land grant in Dutchess County in New York by Governor Benjamin Fletcher known as the Great Nine Partners Patent. The parcel included about four miles (6 km) along the Hudson River and was eight to ten miles (13 to 16 km) wide, extending from the Hudson River to the Connecticut border. On October 14, 1697, he was one of seven patentees of 1,200 acres of land in Deerpark in Orange County, New York.

== Personal life ==
On May 7, 1692, he was married to Maria Hardenbrook. Maria was likely a relative of Margaret Hardenbroeck, the wife of Frederick Philipse, 1st Lord of Philipsburg Manor. Together, they were the parents of:

- David Jamison.
- Elizabeth Jamison, who in 1717 married John Johnston Jr. (1691–c. 1732), a son of Dr. John Johnstone (the 32nd mayor of New York City) and brother of Andrew Johnston (a Speaker of the New Jersey General Assembly). His maternal grandfather was George Scot of Pitlochie.

After her death, he married Johanna Meech on January 16, 1703.

After renouncing the Sweet Singers, he joined the Church of England and, once in America, he served as vestryman and warden of Trinity Church in lower Manhattan.

Jamison died in New York on July 25, 1739. His step daughter-in-law was Mary Campbell, whom he left £400 and all his furniture and household stuff.

=== Descendants ===
Through his daughter Elizabeth, he was a grandfather of prominent merchant David Johnston, who served in the New York General Assembly. David was married to Magdalen Walton, a granddaughter of Dr. Gerardus Beekman, acting Governor of the Province of New York.

== Published works ==
- Jamison, David A journal of what passed in the expedition of His Excellency Col. Benjamin Fletcher, captain general and governour in chief of the province of New-York, &c. to Albany, to renew the covenant chain with the five canton nations of Indians, the Mohaques, Oneydes, Onondages, C...es and Sinnekes. New York: Printed by William Bradford (1696).
