= Verplanck =

Verplanck may refer to:

== Surname ==
- Abraham Isaacsen Verplanck (1606–1690), early settler to New Netherland, and progenitor of the Verplanck line in North America
- Catharina Verplanck (1639–1708), daughter of Abraham and wife of David Pieterse Schuyler, a progenitor of the Schuyler family
- Daniel C. Verplanck (1762–1834), American politician, son of Samuel Verplanck (1739–1820)
- Gulian Verplanck (1637–1684) (also known as Gulyne, Galyna and Geleyn), son of Abraham Issacsen Verplanck and holder of a one-third interest in the Rombout Patent
- Gulian Verplanck (speaker) (1751–1799), American banker and politician, and youngest son of Gulian Verplanck (1698–1751)
- Gulian Crommelin Verplanck (1786–1870), American politician and son of Daniel C. Verplanck
- Marlene VerPlanck (1933–2018), American jazz vocalist
- Philip Verplanck (1695–1771), American sheriff and politician in colonial New York
- Samuel Verplanck (1739–1820), American politician and merchant, brother of Gulian Verplanck (speaker)
- William Samuel Verplanck Junior (1916–2002), American psychologist

== Given name ==
- Beekman V. Hoffman (Beekman Verplanck Hoffman, 1789–1834), American Navy officer
- Verplanck Colvin (1847–1920), American lawyer and topographical engineer
- Verplanck Van Antwerp (1807–1875), American Brevet Brigadier General

== Places ==
- Verplanck, New York, a hamlet in the town of Cortlandt, Westchester County, New York
  - Verplanck's Point

== See also ==
- Verplank, a surname
