= Samuel Verplanck =

American merchant and politician (1739–1820)

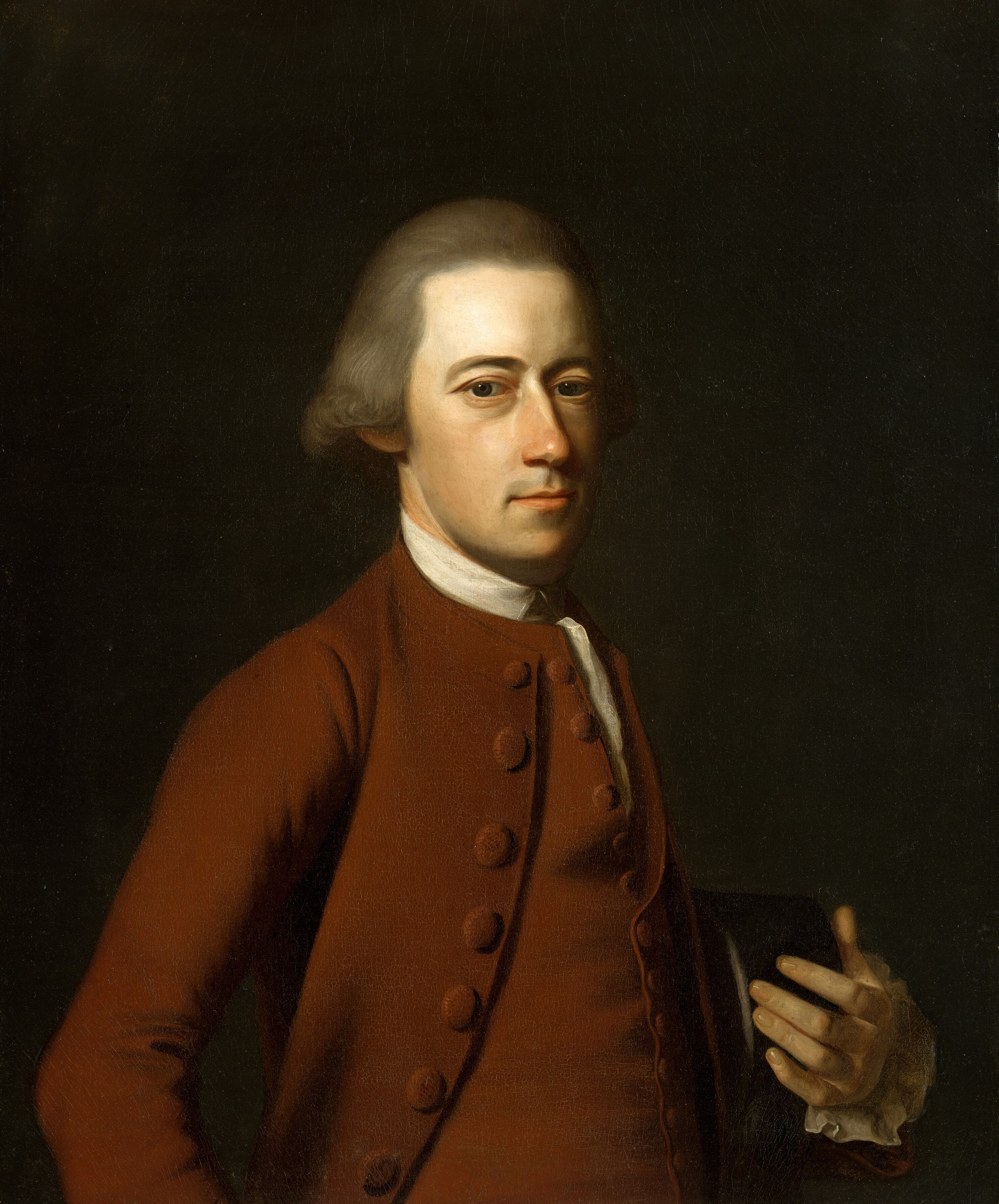
- Portrait by John Singleton Copley, 1771
- Born: 19 September 1739; New York City, New York
- Died: 27 January 1820 (aged 80); New York, U.S.
- Education: King's College
- Spouse: Judith Crommelin (m. 1761; died 1803)
- Children: Daniel C. Verplanck
- Parent(s): Gulian Verplanck; Mary Crommelin
- Relatives: Gulian Verplanck (brother); Gulian C. Verplanck (grandson)

Samuel Verplanck (19 September 1739 – 27 January 1820) was an American merchant and politician.

== Early life ==
Verplanck was born in New York City in the Province of New York, then a part of British America, on 19 September 1739. He was a son of Gulian Verplanck (1698–1751) and Mary (née Crommelin) Verplanck, who married in 1737. His father was a fourth generation New Yorker who owned significant property and amassed a considerable fortune. Among his siblings was younger brother, Gulian Verplanck, a wholesale importer and banker who twice served as Speaker of the New York State Assembly.

His maternal grandfather was Charles Crommelin, a wealthy merchant who dealt in commerce between New York and Holland. Through his brother Gulian (who married Cornelia Johnston), he was an uncle of David Johnston Verplanck (editor of the New York American). Through his maternal aunt, Elizabeth (née Crommelin) Ludlow, he was a first cousin of Daniel Ludlow, the first president of the Manhattan Company, which was founded in 1799 by Aaron Burr to rival Alexander Hamilton's Bank of New York and the New York branch of the First Bank of the United States.

He attended and was among the first class to graduate from King's College and, later, served as a Governor of the College.

== Career ==
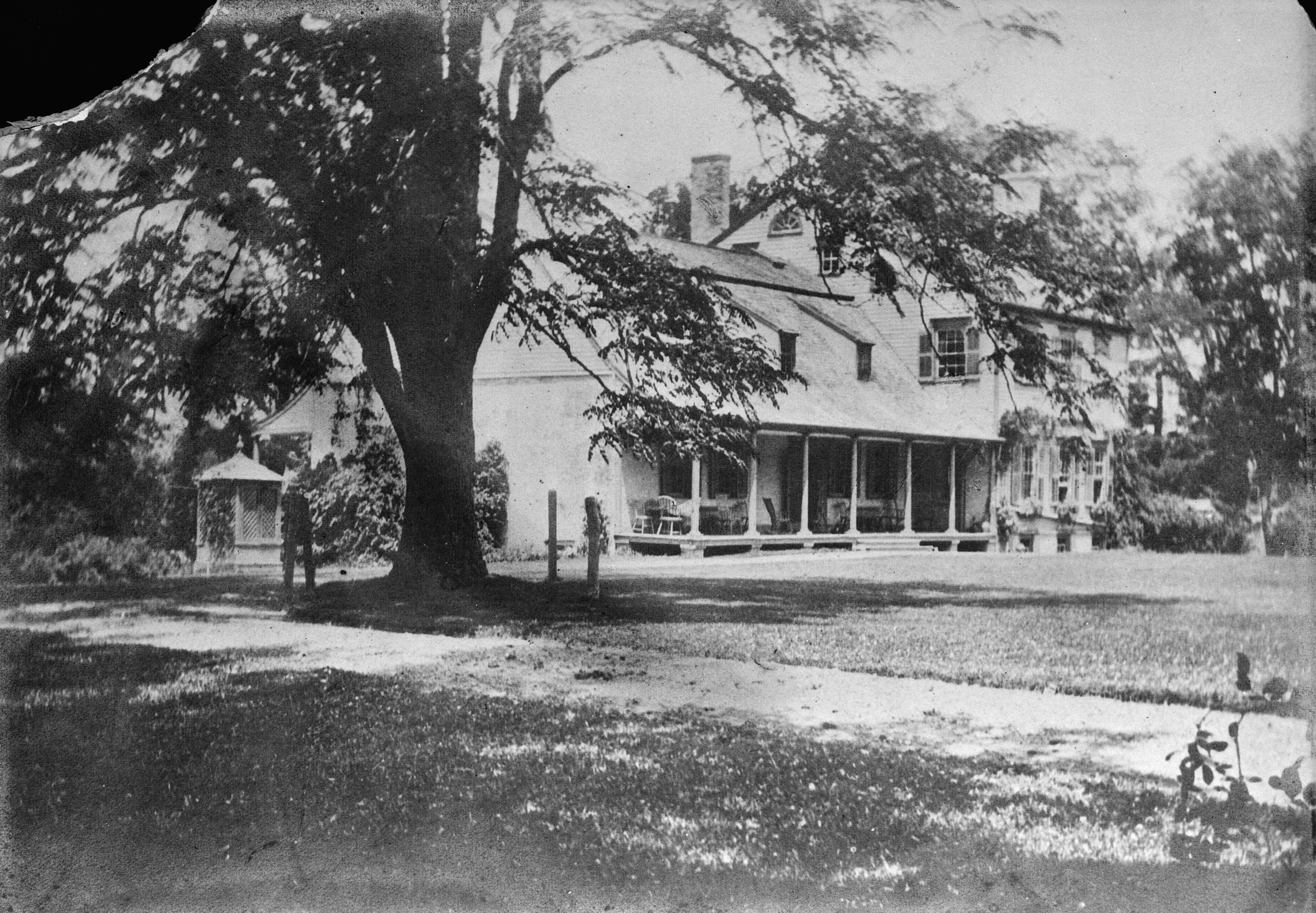
Mount Gulian, Dutchess County

After graduating from King's College, He went to Amsterdam to work for his maternal uncle, Daniel Crommelin, who was the senior partner of Daniel Crommelin & Sons, one of Holland's most important banking and commercial houses. Verplanck returned to New York City in 1763 where he became a successful wholesale importer and banker. In 1768, he was one of the 24 founders of the New York Chamber of Commerce.

He was appointed to the Committee of Safety in 1775 and was a delegate to the New York Provincial Congress, representing the City and County of New York. Not long after signing the Declaration of Association and Union against Great Britain, he retired from taking any active role in the War and chose to remain otherwise neutral. Amongst his personal friends in New York was William Howe, the Commander-in-Chief of British land forces. Due to their conflicting sympathies, Samuel and his wife separated as Judith, a loyalist, remained in New York City, and Samuel, a supporter of the Revolution, withdrew to the family summer home, Mount Gulian on the banks of the Hudson River in the Town of Fishkill that had belonged to his father. There, Verplanck allowed Gen. Baron Friedrich Wilhelm von Steuben to use his house as a headquarters of the Continental Army.

In 1804, he permanently retired to Fishkill in Dutchess County where his ancestor, Gulian Verplanck, had been one of the three original patentees of the Rombout Patent.

== Personal life ==
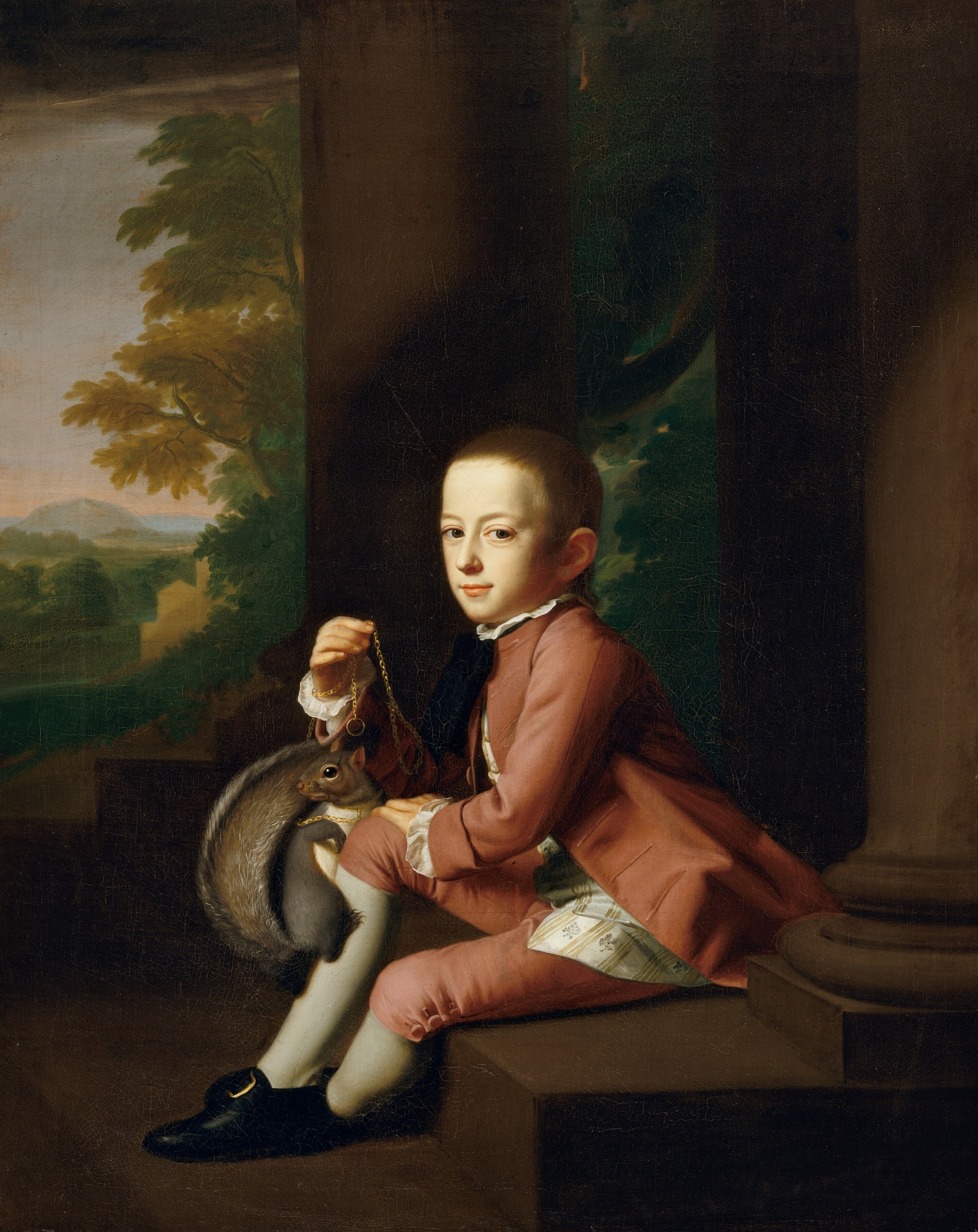
1771 portrait of Verpanck's son Daniel by John Singleton Copley

In 1761, while in Amsterdam, Verplanck was married to his Dutch cousin, Judith Crommelin (1739–1803), a daughter of Daniel Crommelin and Marie (née le Plastrier) Crommelin. Together, they lived in a large yellow brick mansion, at 3 Wall Street (which eventually was replaced by the U.S. Assay Building), and were the parents of several children, only one of whom lived to adulthood:

- Daniel C. Verplanck (1762–1834), a U.S. Representative from New York who married Elizabeth Johnson, the daughter of William Samuel Johnson, the 3rd President of Columbia College and a U.S. Senator from Connecticut, in 1785. After her death in 1789, he married Ann Walton, daughter of William Walton (nephew and heir of William Walton) and Mary (née De Lancey) Walton, in 1790.

Verplanck died on 27 January 1820.

=== Descendants ===
Through his son Daniel, he was a grandfather of, among others, Gulian Crommelin Verplanck (1786–1870), who was also a member of the U.S. House of Representatives.

=== Legacy ===
Portraits of Samuel and his then nine year old son Daniel, made in 1771 by John Singleton Copley are today in the Metropolitan Museum of Art, together with "the Verplanck Room", which contains other paintings, furnishings, and cermaics from the Verplanck house that were later moved to Fishkill.
