= Knickerbockers (clothing) =

Baggy-kneed breeches popular in the early 20th-century

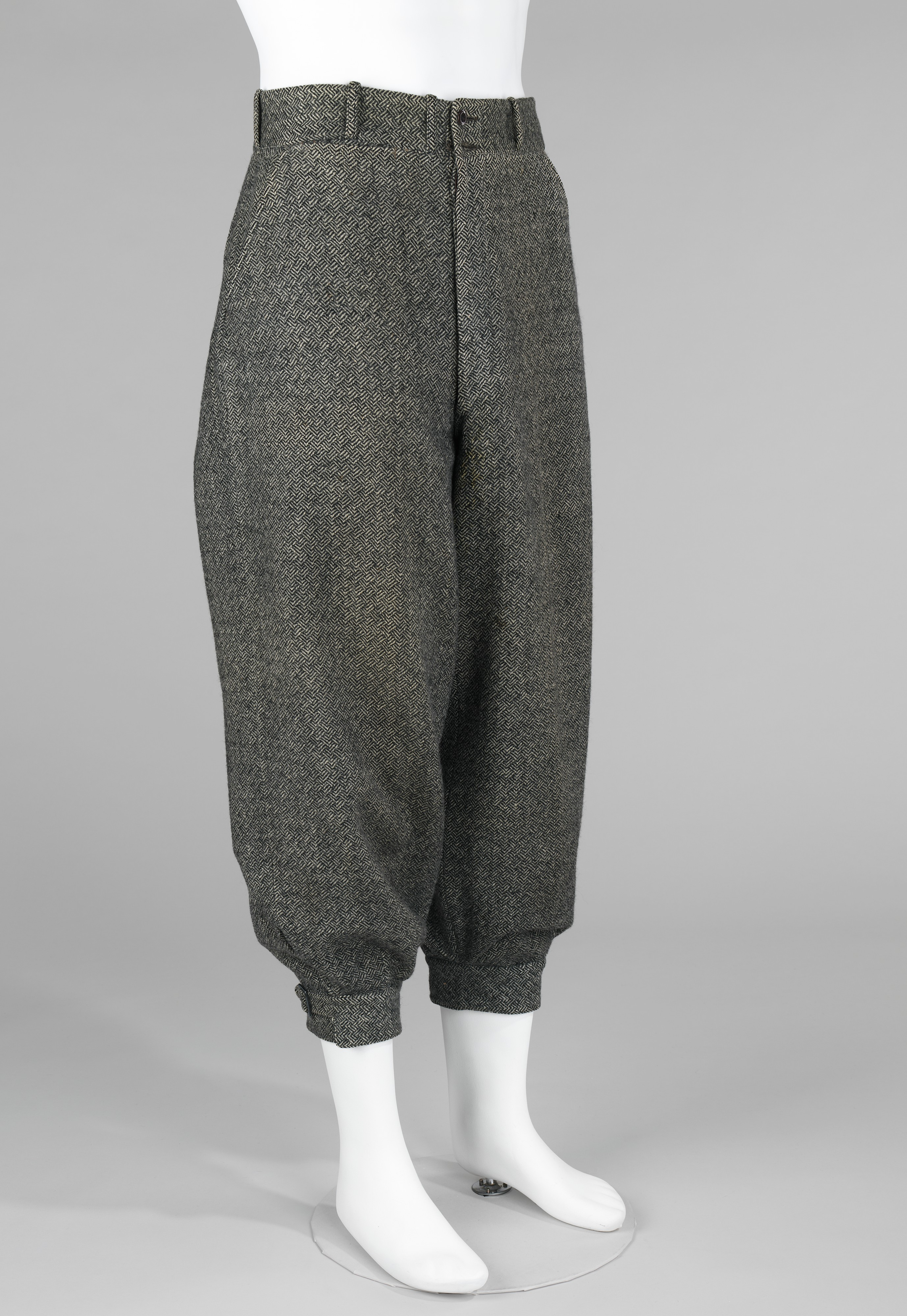
Example of American knickers

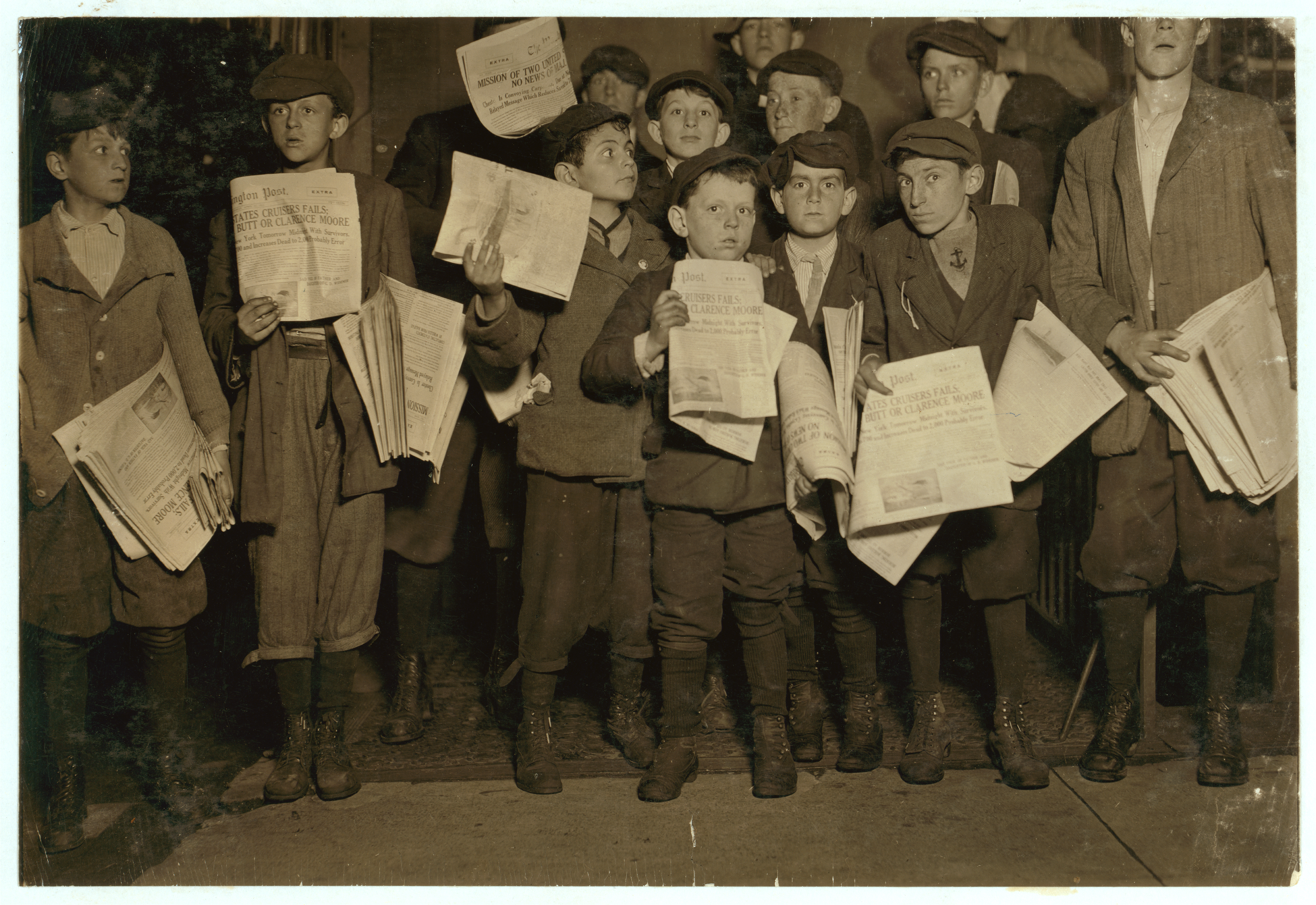
News boys wearing knickerbockers, Washington, D.C., 1912

Knickerbockers, or knickers in the United States (US), are a form of baggy-kneed breeches, particularly popular in the early 20th-century United States. Golfers' plus twos and plus fours are similar. Until after World War I, in many English-speaking countries, boys customarily wore short trousers in summer and "knee pants" similar to knickers in winter. At the onset of puberty or sometime in their teens, they graduated to long trousers. In that era, the transition to "long pants" was a major rite of passage. Men continued to wear knickerbockers for athletics, outdoor work, and other informal activities for which they were practical. During the early 20th century, knickerbockers were also increasingly worn by women.

The fashion was exported from the US to Britain around the 1860s and continued until the 1920s, when it was superseded by above-knee-length short trousers (shorts), probably due to the popularity of the scouting movement whose uniform included shorts. Towards the end of this period, knickerbockers may have been more of a "fancy" dress item, for formal occasions, rather than everyday wear. At around 13 years, boys exchanged their knickerbockers for long trousers.

Baseball players historically wore a stylized form of knickerbockers, although the pants have become less baggy in recent decades and some modern ballplayers opt to pull the trousers close to the ankles. The white knickerbocker-like pants worn by American football officials are a legacy of early football players wearing knickerbockers to play in. In recent years, the NFL has equipped its officials with long trousers rather than knickers in cold weather.

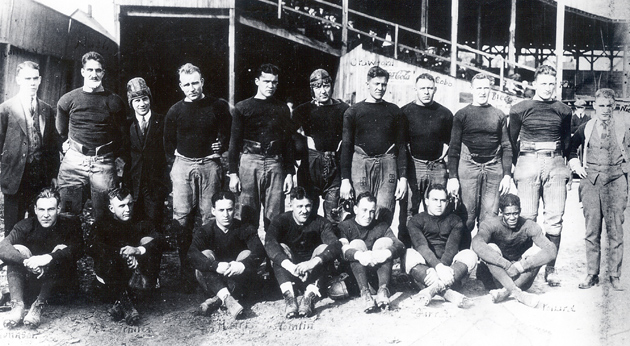
The Akron Pros won the first American professional football championship in 1920.

== History ==
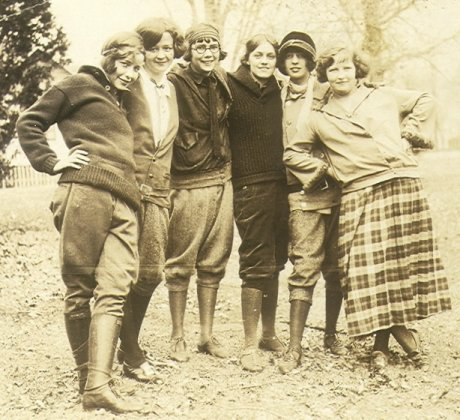
Women wearing knickerbockers, Minnesota, 1924

The name "Knickerbocker" first acquired meaning with Washington Irving's History of New York, which featured the fictional author Diedrich Knickerbocker, an old-fashioned Dutch New Yorker in Irving's satire of chatty and officious local history. In fact, Washington Irving had a real friend named Herman Knickerbocker (1779–1855), whose name he borrowed. In turn, Herman Knickerbocker was of the upstate Knickerbocker clan, which descended from a single immigrant ancestor, Harmen Jansen van Wijhe Knickerbocker. Jansen van Wijhe invented the name upon arriving in New Amsterdam and signed a document with a variant of it in 1682.

After Irving's History, "Knickerbocker" had become by 1831 a local byword for an imagined old Dutch-descended New York aristocracy, their old-fashioned ways, their long-stemmed pipes, and knee-breeches long after the fashion had turned to slacks. (Such cultural heritage sprang almost entirely from Irving's imagination and became a well-known example of an invented tradition.) "Knickerbocker" became a byword for a New York patrician, comparable to a "Boston Brahmin".

The "New York Knickerbockers" were an amateur social and athletic club organized by Alexander Cartwright on Manhattan's (Lower) East Side in 1842, largely to play "base ball" according to written rules, the first organized team in baseball history; on June 19, 1846 the New York Knickerbockers played the first game of "base ball" organized under those rules, in Hoboken, New Jersey, and were trounced, 23–1. The Knickerbocker name stayed with the team even after it moved its base of operations to Elysian Fields in Hoboken in 1846. The baseball link may have prompted Casey Stengel to joyously exclaim, "It's great to be back as the manager of the Knickerbockers!" when he was named pilot of the newborn New York Mets in 1961.

Knickerbocker gave the name of the locally-brewed "Knickerbocker Beer" brewed by Jacob Ruppert and the first sponsors of the TV show Tonight!, hence the gossip columnist "Cholly Knickerbocker", the pen name of Igor Cassini, as well as the extremely high-toned Knickerbocker Club (still in a neo-Georgian mansion on Fifth Avenue at 62nd Street, which was founded in 1871 when some members of the Union Club became concerned that admission policies were not strict enough) and the New York Knicks, whose corporate name is the "New York Knickerbockers".

The Knickerbocker name was an integral part of the New York scene when the Basketball Association of America granted a charter franchise to the city in the summer of 1946. As can best be determined, the final decision to call the team the "Knickerbockers" was made by the club's founder, Ned Irish. The team is now generally referred to as the New York Knicks.

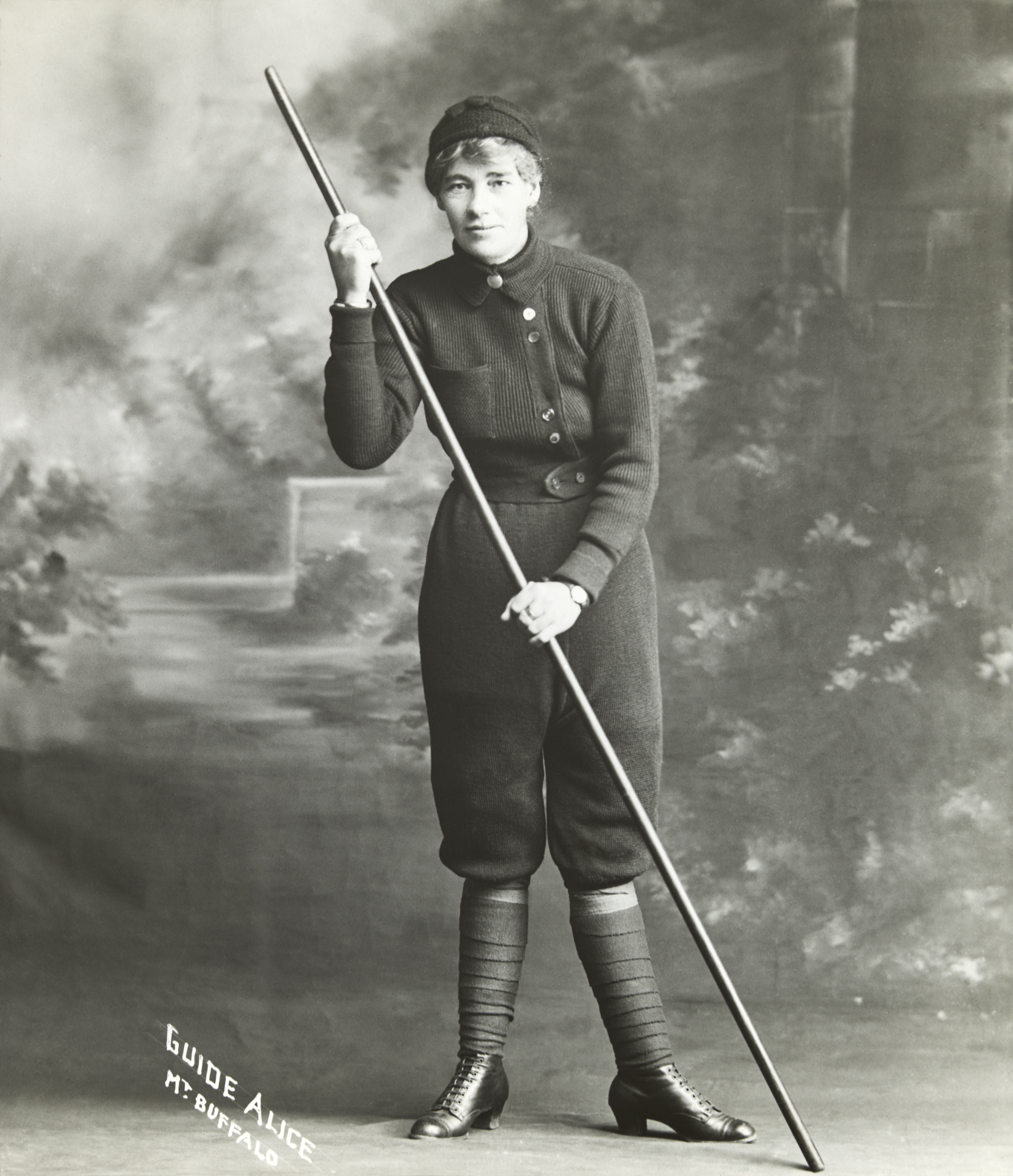
Alice Manfield wearing a style of knickbockers in the early 20th century for her work as a mountain guide in Australia

=== Use in sporting endeavors ===
Knickerbockers have been popular in other sporting endeavors, particularly golf, rock climbing, cross-country skiing, fencing and bicycling. In cycling, they were standard attire for nearly 100 years, with the majority of archival photos of cyclists in the era before World War I showing men wearing knickerbockers tucked into long socks. They remained fairly popular in Britain (where they were called "breeks" or "trews") in the years between World War I and World War II, but eventually were eclipsed in popularity by racing tights, even among the vast majority of cyclists who never raced. Invariably referred to as "knickers" in the US, they lived on as a just-past-the-knee variant of racing tights reserved for colder-weather riding.

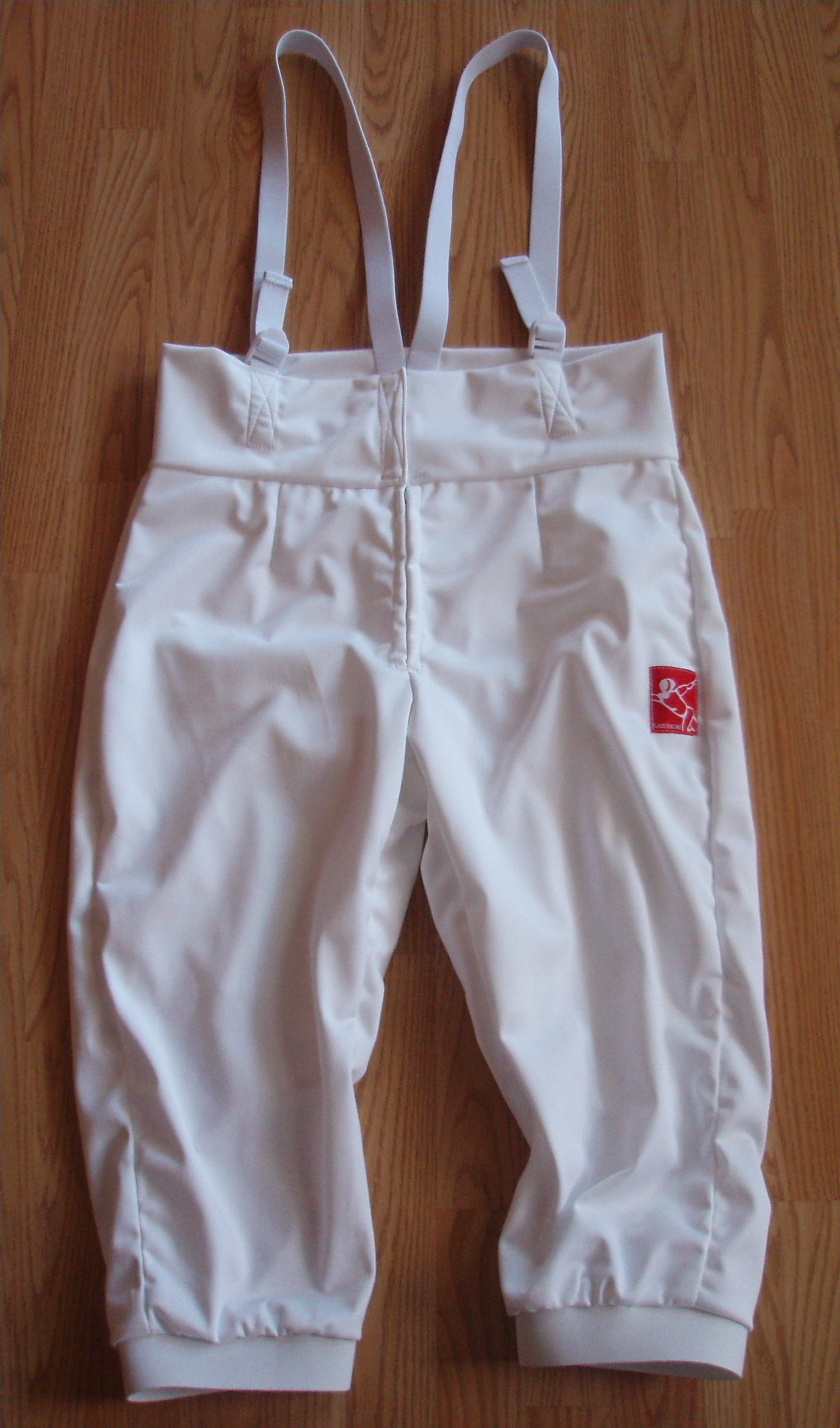
Fencing knickers in 2006

Knickers are still worn as part of the conventional uniform in fencing. Knickerbockers are often worn in baseball as pants, a custom that has been practiced even since long pants became widely used in the US. The traditional knickerbockers of old were more like pants that had been folded back with long socks.

=== Style ===
During the early 1980s, media interest in the then-Lady Diana Spencer brought a brief commercial revival of the look in women's and unisex fashion both in Europe and North America, particularly among the "town and country", "New Romantic", and "preppie" sets. By 1984, the style had waned as more top-heavy styles with snug pants rendered the style obsolete.

== Japan ==
In Japan, tobi trousers—similar to knickerbockers—are worn by construction workers, and their popular length has significantly increased over time, lowering the baggy part down the bottom of the leg like plus-fours and plus-sixes, and sometimes to the feet like trousers.

== United Kingdom ==
In the United Kingdom, Ireland, and some Commonwealth nations, the term knickers is used for women's undergarments. Use of the term owes its origin to illustrator George Cruikshank, who did the illustrations for Washington Irving's droll History of New York when it was published in London. He showed the old-time Knickerbockers in their loose Dutch breeches, and by 1859, short loose ladies' undergarments, a kind of abbreviated version of pantalettes or pantaloons, were knickers in England.

== India ==
Knickers for boys and young men were introduced in the Indian subcontinent during the British Raj. Knicker is used as a loanword in many Indian languages to refer to shorts, like nikar in Hindi, and nikkaru in Kannada and Telugu.

== See also ==
- Bloomers (clothing)
- Breeches
- Jodhpurs
- Knickerbocracy
- Plus fours
