= Isaac Bloom =

American politician (1748–1893)

Member of the U.S. House of Representatives from New York's 6th district
- In office March 4, 1803 – April 26, 1803
- Preceded by: John P. Van Ness
- Succeeded by: Daniel C. Verplanck

Member of the New York State Assembly
- In office 1788-1792

Personal details
- Born: 1748 Jamaica, Province of New York, British America
- Died: April 26, 1803 (aged 54–55) Poughkeepsie, New York, U.S.
- Citizenship: United States
- Party: Democratic-Republican Party
- Profession: merchant; politician

Military service
- Allegiance: United States of America
- Rank: Captain
- Unit: Minutemen of the Charlotte Precinct
- Battles/wars: American Revolutionary War

Isaac Bloom (1748 – April 26, 1803) was an American politician and a United States representative from New York.

== Biography ==
Bloom was born in Jamaica in the Province of New York.

== Career ==
Bloom later moved to Clinton, Dutchess County, New York, and was a captain of minutemen of the Charlotte precinct in Dutchess County in 1775. He was a merchant in 1784, and from 1788 to 1792 was a member of the New York State Assembly.

A delegate to the New York state convention in 1801, Bloom was also a member of the New York State Senate from 1800 to 1802. He was elected as a Democratic-Republican as a U. S. Representative for the sixth district of New York to the 8th United States Congress, but died before Congress met. The office was his from March 4, 1803, until his death on April 26, 1803.

== Death ==
Bloom died in Poughkeepsie, New York. Dutchess County, New York, on April 26, 1803 (age about 56 years). He is interred at Pittsbury Presbyterian Churchyard, Washington Hollow, New York.

== See also ==
- List of members of the United States Congress who died in office (1790–1899)

U.S. House of Representatives
Preceded by John P. Van Ness	Member of the U.S. House of Representatives from New York's 6th congressional district March 4, 1803 – April 26, 1803 (death)	Succeeded by Daniel C. Verplanck
