= David Johnston (merchant) =

American merchant and politician

President of the Saint Andrew's Society of the State of New York
- In office 1774–1785
- Preceded by: Thomas Drummond
- Succeeded by: Robert R. Livingston

Personal details
- Born: 3 January 1724 Perth Amboy, Province of New Jersey, British America
- Died: 12 January 1809 (aged 85) Lithgow, New York, U.S.
- Spouse: Magdalen Walton (after 1753)
- Relations: John Johnstone (grandfather); Andrew Johnston (uncle)

David Johnston (or Johnstone) (3 January 1724 – 12 January 1809) was an American merchant and politician of Scottish descent who served as the president of the Saint Andrew's Society of the State of New York.

== Early life ==
Johnston was born on 3 January 1724 at Perth Amboy in the Province of New Jersey, which was then a part of British America. He was the second son of John Johnston Jr., a major in the British Army, and the former Elizabeth Jamison. His elder brother, John Johnston, married their cousin, Euphemia Johnston (daughter of Andrew Johnston), and was Colonel of the New Jersey Provincial troops at the capture of Fort Niagara during the French and Indian War in 1758. (Note: His uncle, Andrew Johnston (Speaker of the New Jersey General Assembly), was married to Catherine Van Cortlandt, the daughter of Stephanus Van Cortlandt (a Mayor of New York City).)

His paternal grandparents were Eupham (née Scot) Johnston (only daughter of George Scot, Laird of Pitlochie) and Dr. John Johnstone of Edinburgh, who emigrated to the United States in 1685 and served as Mayor of New York City from 1714 to 1718. Through his father, he was a member of the Border Reiver Scottish clan Johnstone and, reportedly, in "middle life he was called upon to receive the title and estate of Marquis of Annandale," a title in the Peerage of Scotland, (Note: The Marquis of Annandale, a title created in the Peerage of Scotland in 1701 for William Johnstone, 1st Marquess of Annandale (previously the 2nd Earl of Annandale and Hartfell). The title became extinct upon the death of George Vanden-Bempde, 3rd Marquess of Annandale in April 1792.) "but declined on the ground that he was an American and unwilling to give up his birthright for a life in England, but later, at the coming of age of his eldest son, regretted his refusal."

His maternal grandfather, David Jamison, was one of the so-called Nine Partners who purchased a large tract of land in the Province of New York in 1697. Jamison served as Secretary of the State of the Colony of New York, Warden of Trinity Church, Chief Justice of the Colony of New Jersey in 1711, and Attorney General of the Colony of New York in 1720. (Note: Jamison was sent to New Jersey in 1685 as a political exile and was obliged to serve four years' retainment to pay for his passage.)

== Career ==
At a young age, he entered business as a wine merchant, trading directly with the Netherlands using his own ship. He worked as a merchant until the death of his mother when he inherited his share of the Nine Partners Tract, which by then was worth a substantial amount, and required his considerable attention as his land and estates were extensive. By 1800, Johnston owned 15 slaves at his estate in the Hudson Valley.

=== Political career ===
In February 1761, he was elected to the New York General Assembly and was registered a Freeman of the City on 21 August 1770 as "David Johnston, Gentleman." On 19 May 1774, he was chosen as one of the Committee of Correspondence, and "subsequently chosen as one of a Committee of Observation elected by a poll held at the City Hall by order of the Committee of Correspondence. He was also one of a Committee of One Hundred selected at the agitation to the War of Independence."

On 26 April 1775, he was one of the signers of a call for a New York Provincial Congress.

== Personal life ==
On 27 May 1753, Johnston was married to Magdalen Walton. Magdalen was a daughter of William Walton (Note: Sometimes listed as Jacob Walton.) and Mary (née Beekman) Walton (a daughter of Dr. Gerardus Beekman, acting Governor of the Province of New York). Magdalen's sister Mary Walton was the wife of Lewis Morris, signer of the Declaration of Independence. In New York City, he had a mansion on the east side of Bowling Green (which was burned during the Revolutionary War), a farm in Greenwich Village, a farm in Perth Amboy (which was burned by the Hessians when the British Army occupied New Jersey), and in the Hudson Valley, he owned a large country estate and residence known as Annandale in Lithgow (a hamlet within Washington, New York Johnston named after Linlithgow, the ancestral home of his maternal grandfather) where he permanently moved to after the War. Together, they were the parents of three sons and seven daughters, including:

- Mary Johnston (b. 1754), who married John Allen (d. 1778), son of William Allen (Chief Justice of the Province of Pennsylvania and mayor of Philadelphia), in 1775.
- Elizabeth Johnston (b. 1755), who married Capt. George Elliot Salter in 1783.
- Cornelia Johnston (1757–1815), who married Gulian Verplanck, Speaker of the New York State Assembly, in 1784.
- John Johnston (1759–1759), who died in infancy.
- Magdalen Johnston (b. 1760)
- John Johnston (1762–1850), who married Susannah Bard, daughter of Dr. Samuel Bard, the personal physician of President George Washington. Johnston was presiding Judge of the Court of Common Pleas of Dutchess County from 1807 to 1817.
- Effie Johnston (b. c. 1764)
- David Johnston (b. 1766)
- Johanna Johnston (b. 1769)
- Jacob Johnston (1770–1811)
- Euphemia Johnston (b. 1774)

He served two terms, first from 1774 to 1775 and secondly from 1784 to 1785, as president of the Saint Andrew's Society of the State of New York, a charitable organization founded in 1756 that focuses on helping Scots in the New York community. (Note: The history of the Society from 1774 to 1784, during the Revolutionary War, remains a blank.)

Johnston died on 12 January 1809 at his country residence, Annandale.
