= Diedrich Knickerbocker =

American literary character

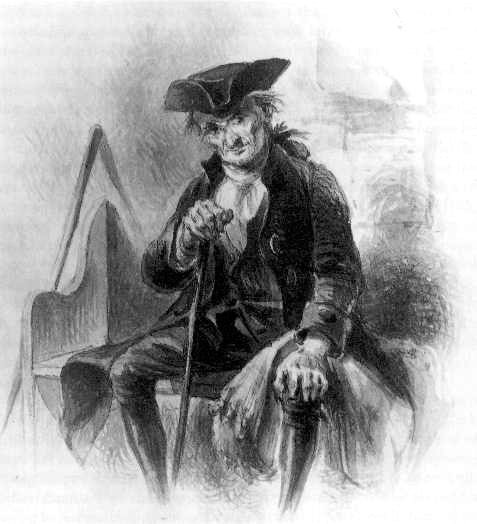
The fictional "Diedrich Knickerbocker" from the frontispiece of A History of New-York, a wash drawing by Felix O. C. Darley

Diedrich Knickerbocker is an American literary character who originated from Washington Irving's first novel, A History of New-York from the Beginning of the World to the End of the Dutch Dynasty, by Diedrich Knickerbocker (1809). He is a Dutch-American historian who is dressed in eighteenth-century breeches, which would later return to fashion as knickerbockers, later shortened to knickers. The word knickerbocker is also used to refer to people who live in Manhattan, and was adopted in a shortened form as the Knicks by the city's NBA professional basketball team.

== History ==
In 1809, Washington Irving wrote his first novel, A History of New-York from the Beginning of the World to the End of the Dutch Dynasty, by Diedrich Knickerbocker. It was a satire of the politics of the day and history books. To promote the book he started a hoax by contacting various newspapers in New York City that "well-known Dutch historian Diedrich Knickerbocker had disappeared from his hotel". Irving informed people that if Mr. Knickerbocker remained absent he would publish a manuscript that the man had left behind. Many people at the time believed the story and when Irving finally revealed it was all made up he gained enough local fame to help his book become an instant success, practically launching his literary career.

One of Irving's friends was actually named Knickerbocker: Herman Knickerbocker (1779–1855). Herman Knickerbocker, in turn, was of the upstate Knickerbocker clan, which descended from a single immigrant ancestor, Harmen Jansen van Wijhe Knickerbocker. Jansen van Wijhe invented the name upon arriving in New Amsterdam and signed a document with a variant of it in 1682.

== In popular culture ==
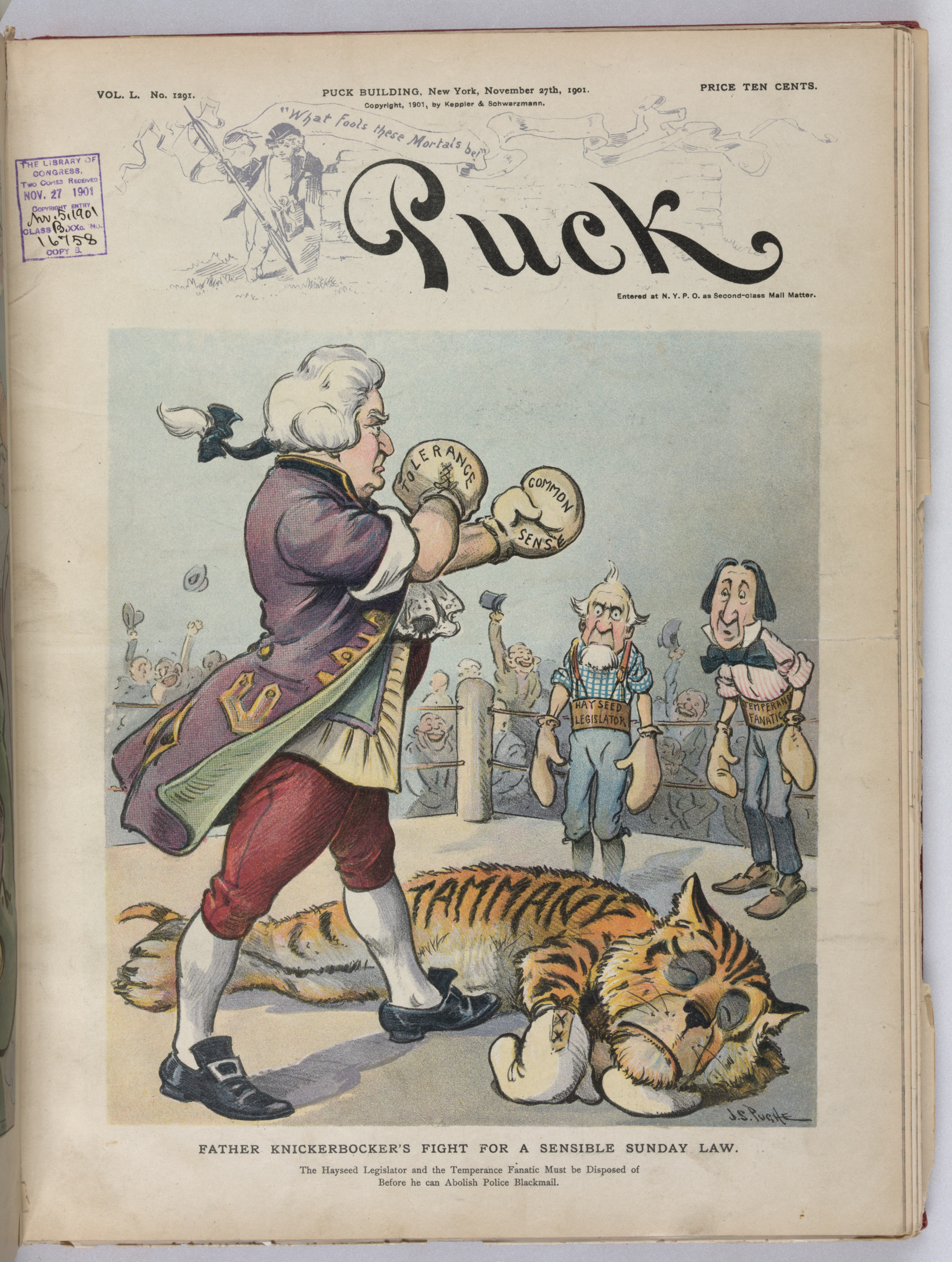
Father Knickerbocker punches out the Tammany Tiger, Puck 1901.

A popular daily newspaper serving Albany, NY was named the Knickerbocker News for the region's Dutch heritage and Irving's character. It ran from 1843 to 1988, when it was merged with the Times Union.

In the 19th century a literary group was named after the character: Knickerbocker Group, who also had their own magazine, The Knickerbocker (1833–1865). In the first and second issue Knickerbocker gave a supposed interview.

The name "knickerbocker" has become a popular nickname for people who reside in Manhattan. It also inspired the name of a type of baggy-kneed trousers for boys: knickerbockers. The New York basketball team New York Knickerbockers (more commonly known as the Knicks) also derived their name from this character. It also inspired a beer brand by Jacob Ruppert, the first sponsors of the TV show Tonight!, as well as sponsors of New York Giants baseball, with prominent "Have a Knick" signs at the Polo Grounds.

Igor Cassini, a gossip columnist, used the name "Cholly Knickerbocker" as his pseudonym.

"Father Knickerbocker" served the role of civic personification of New York City in the illustrated Daily Graphic newspaper, Puck magazine, and elsewhere. In May 1949, polyglot city official James J. O’Brien toured the globe dressed as Father Knickerbocker on behalf of the New York World Trade Week Committee.

The NBA's renowned New York Knicks franchise is fully known as the "New York Knickerbockers". From their debut in 1946 through the 1963-64 season, the Knicks were represented by a logo that came to be known as "Father Knickerbocker". The logo was later used as an identity for the Knicks' developmental team in Westchester. Father Knickerbocker was also used on the Con Edison electric company's logo until 1968.
