= Plus fours =

Sporting breeches

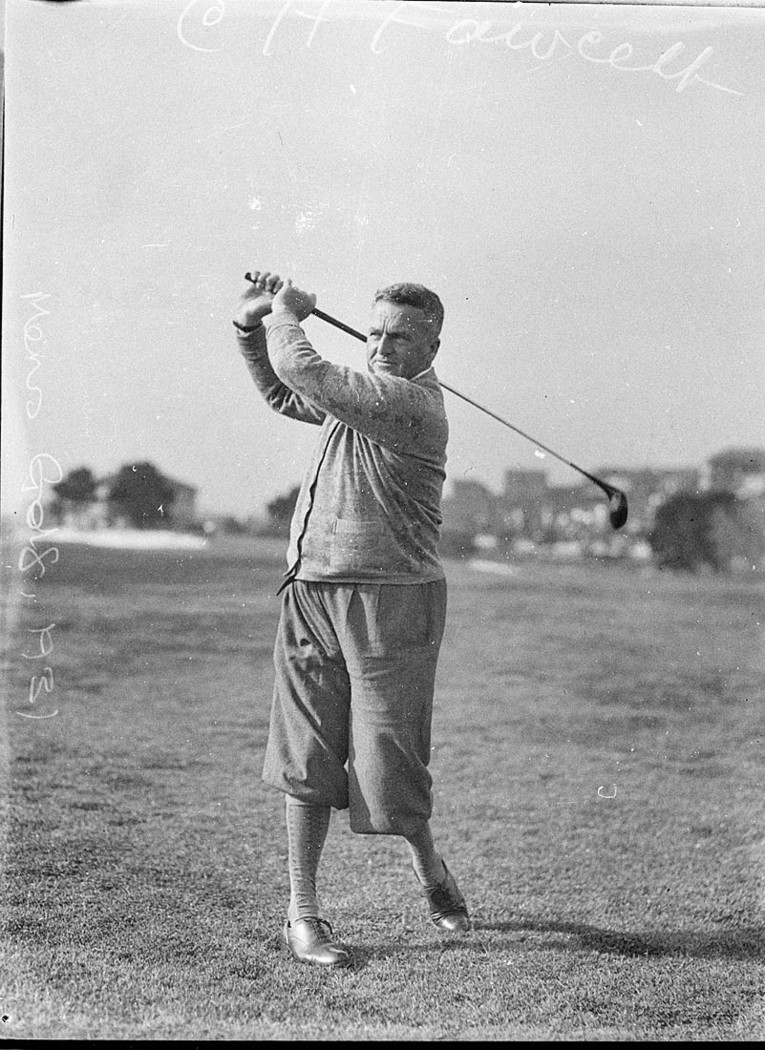
Australian golfer in plus fours, 1931

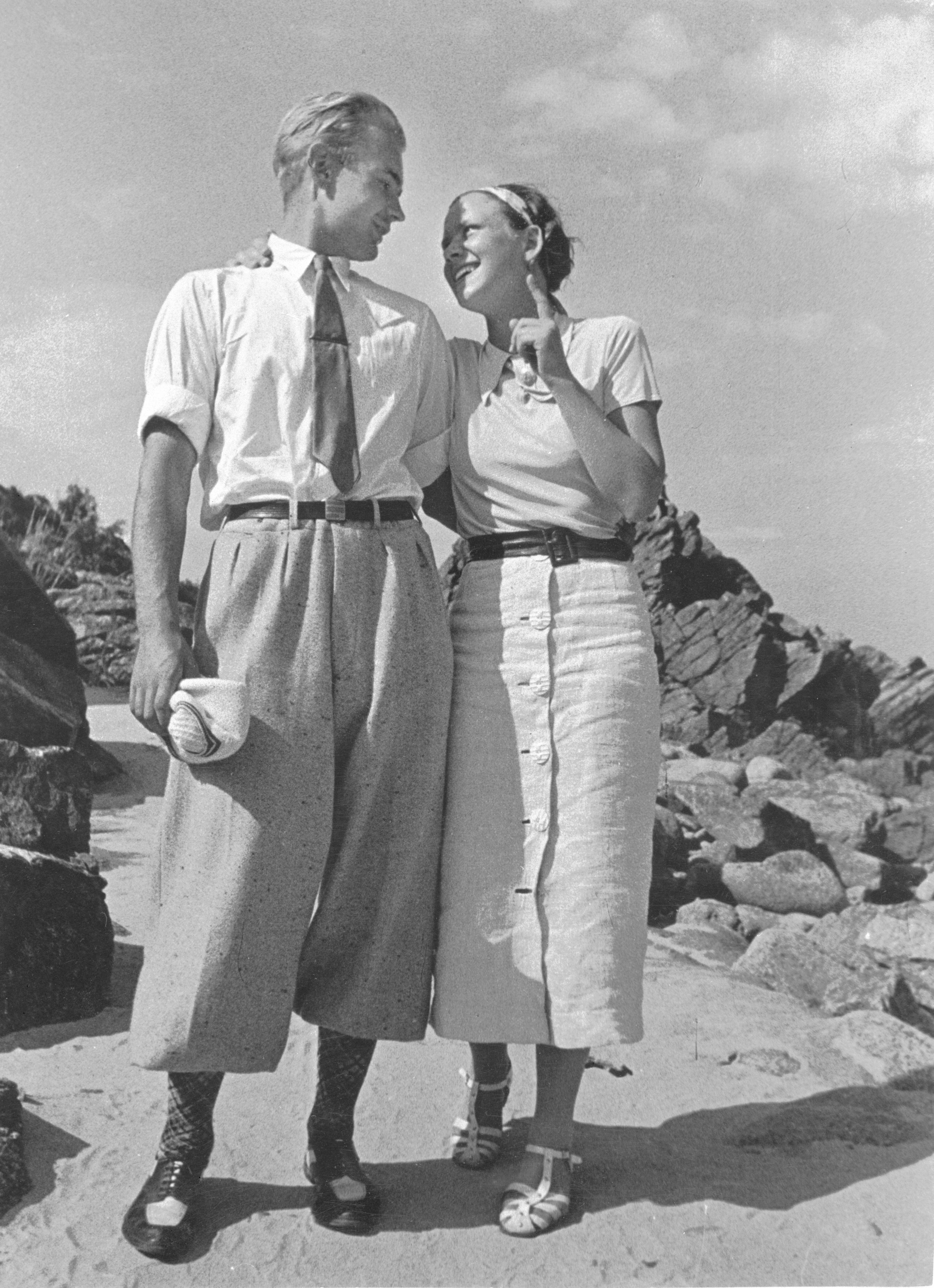
1930s beachwear

Plus fours or plus-fours are breeches or trousers that extend four inches (10 cm) below the knee (and thus four inches longer than traditional knickerbockers, hence the name). Knickerbockers have been traditionally associated with sporting attire since the 1860s. Plus fours were introduced in the 1920s and became popular among sportsmen—particularly golfers and game shooters—because they allowed more freedom of movement than knickerbockers. Less known are plus twos, plus sixes, and plus eights, of similar definitions, but accordingly varying lengths.

== History ==
An "extravagant, careless style that fit right in with the looser fashions and lifestyles of the 1920s", plus fours were introduced to the United States by Edward, Prince of Wales (later Edward VIII), during a trip in 1924. They were later brought back to prominence by the professional golfer Payne Stewart, who wore them on the PGA Tour (active years 1982–1999). In 2008, plus fours were featured in André Benjamin's Benjamin Bixby clothing line, which was based on clothing worn by Ivy League athletes in the 1930s.

== Media ==
- Tintin, the comic book character from The Adventures of Tintin, wears plus fours.
