= Verplank =

Verplank is a surname. Notable people with the surname include:

- Bill Verplank, American engineer and designer
- Scott Verplank (born 1964), American golfer

== See also ==
- Verplanck (disambiguation)
