= Mount Gulian =

Historic house in New York, United States

- U.S. National Register of Historic Places
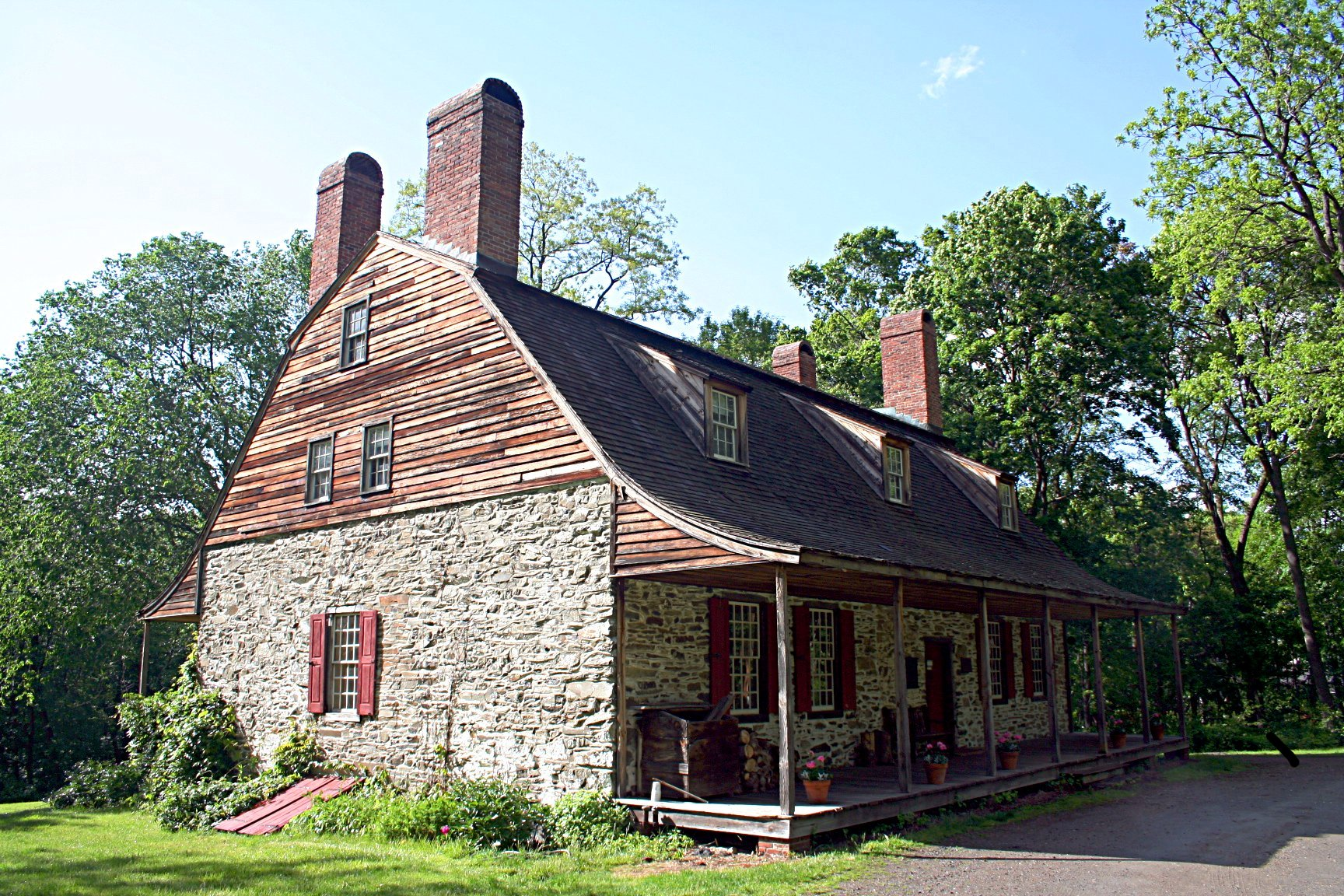
- Mount Gulian manor house
- Location: Town of Fishkill, NY
- Nearest city: Beacon
- Coordinates: 41°31′17″N 73°58′49″W
- Built: 1730s
- Architect: Philip and Guilian Verplanck
- Architectural style: Colonial
- NRHP reference No.: 82001152
- Added to NRHP: 1982

Mount Gulian is a reconstructed 18th century Dutch manor house on the Hudson River in the town of Fishkill, New York, United States of America. The original house served as the headquarters of Major General Friedrich Wilhelm von Steuben during the American Revolutionary War and was the place where the Society of the Cincinnati was founded. The site is registered as a National Historic Landmark.

== History ==
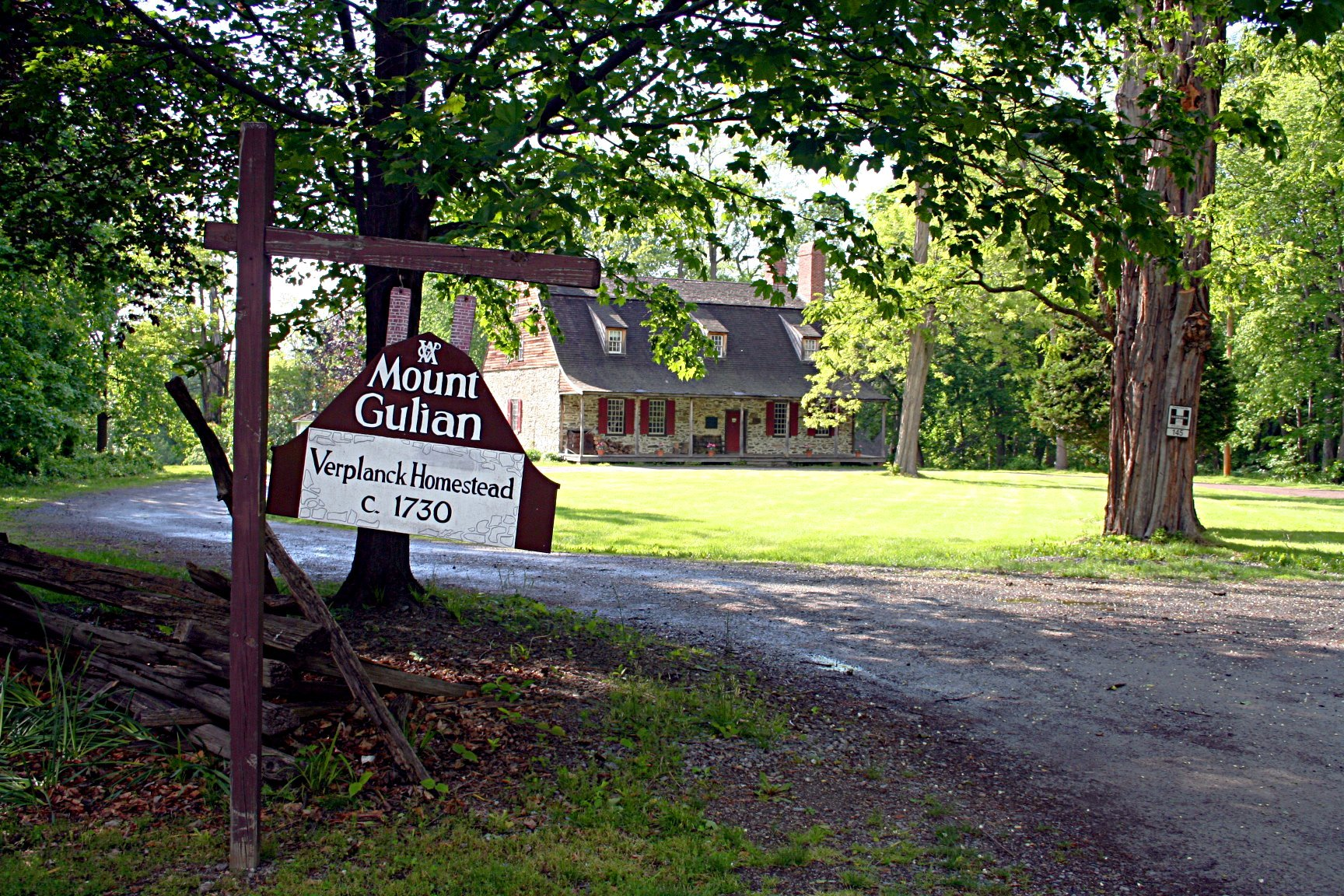
Entrance to Mount Gulian

Archeological studies indicate intermittent Native Americans presence since 6,000 BC. The land on which the house stands was purchased from the Wappinger Native Americans by two fur traders, Francis Rombout and Gulian Verplanck on August 8, 1683. In exchange for 85,000 acres (344 square kilometers) of land, they paid about 1,250 dollars in goods. The Rombout Patent which formally granted the land to Francis Rombout and Gulian Verplanck was issued by King James II of England on October 17, 1685. After Gulian Verplanck's death, his estate was eventually divided among his heirs.

Gulian Verplanck II, a merchant from New York City, received 2,880 acres, 400 of which were on a slope overlooking the Hudson River. He named his estate Mount Gulian, in honor of his grandfather and had the first house on the site built between 1730 and 1740. The building was a small structure with an A-roof. Archaeological evidence suggests it was probably enlarged around 1767 and the characteristic gambrel roof as well as two porches were added between this year and the American Revolutionary War.

=== Revolutionary War ===
During this war, Gulian Verplanck's son Samuel stayed at the house, while his wife Judith Crommelin remained at the family mansion at 3 Wall Street, New York City. In early 1783 Major General Friedrich Wilhelm von Steuben made Mount Gulian his headquarters. At the same time, George Washington had his headquarters in Hasbrouck House, Newburgh on the opposite side of the Hudson River.

On the morning of May 13, 1783, a group of officers of the Continental Army met at Mount Gulian to found the Society of the Cincinnati. Mount Gulian is the headquarters of the Society's New York State branch. In 1803, upon the death of Judith Commerlin Verplanck, the family mansion at 3 Wall Street was closed and much of its furnishings moved to Mount Gulian. The building was extended by in 1804 by Daniel Crommelin Verplanck, the grandson of Gulian Verplanck II, who also laid out the garden. When Marquis de Lafayette visited the house on his return to America in 1824, he stayed in the new addition.

=== James Brown ===
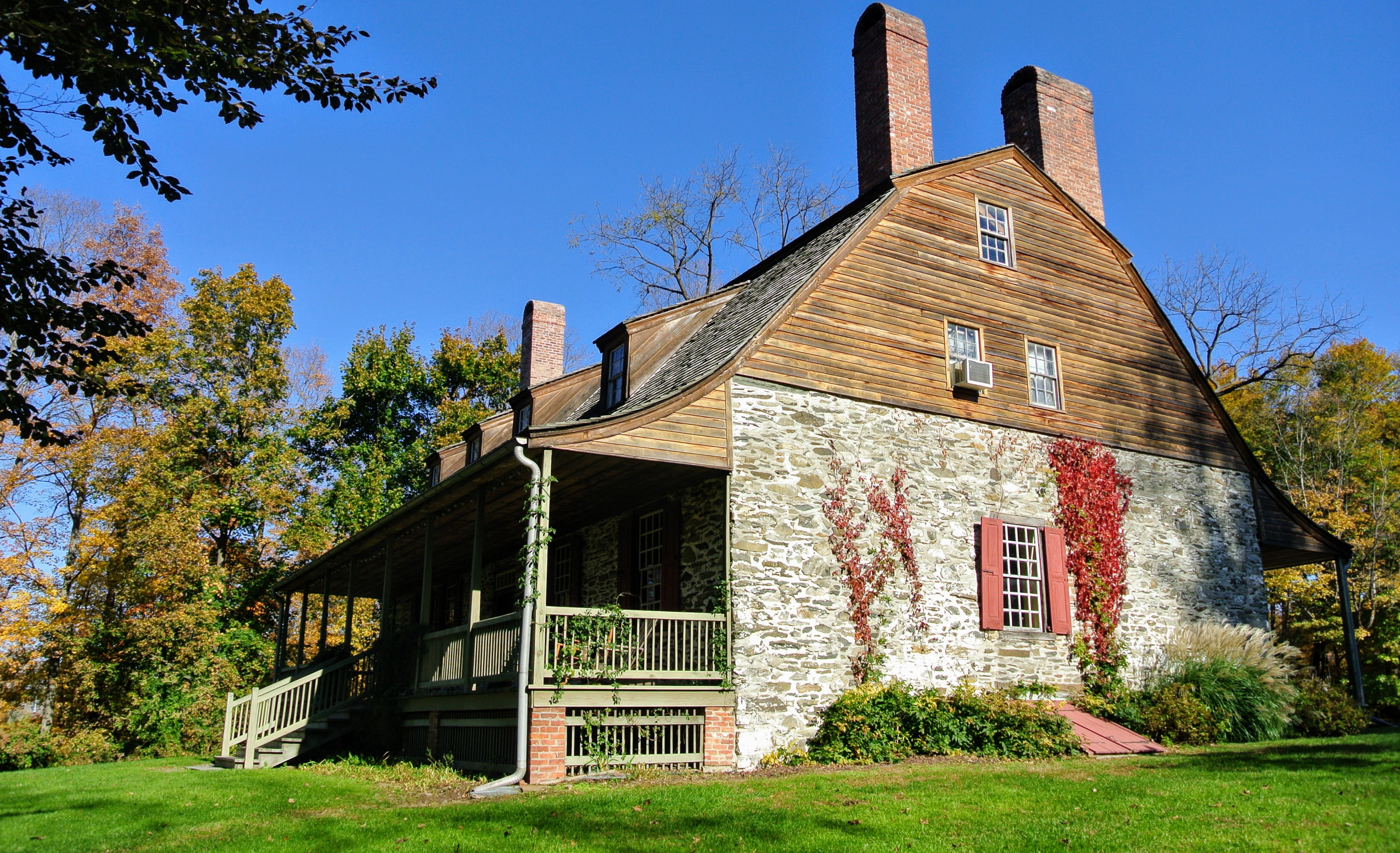
The Verplanck house replica

James Brown was born into slavery in Fredericktown, Maryland in 1793, and escaped via the Underground Railroad to New York City, where found work as a waiter at the Verplanck's mansion on Wall St. A story handed down in the Verplanck family relates that a dinner guest recognized Brown as an escaped slave, and notified the owner in Maryland. According to William E. Verplanck, "This made necessary the redemption of James." The master was paid off and Brown was hired by the Verplancks as a coachman in Manhattan. He learned to read and write, most likely taught by Mary Anna Verplanck, eldest daughter of Daniel C. Verplanck. Brown was employed as the master gardener at Mount Gulian from 1826 to 1864. In September 1826, he returned to Maryland and purchased his wife's freedom with money he had saved while working up north. Around 1826 James Brown began to keep a detailed journal of everyday life, one of the very few journals of daily life as experienced by a black person anywhere in the North.

In 1849 construction of the Hudson River Railroad cut off access to the Verplanck boat and bathhouse at the end of the property at the shoreline.

== Restoration ==
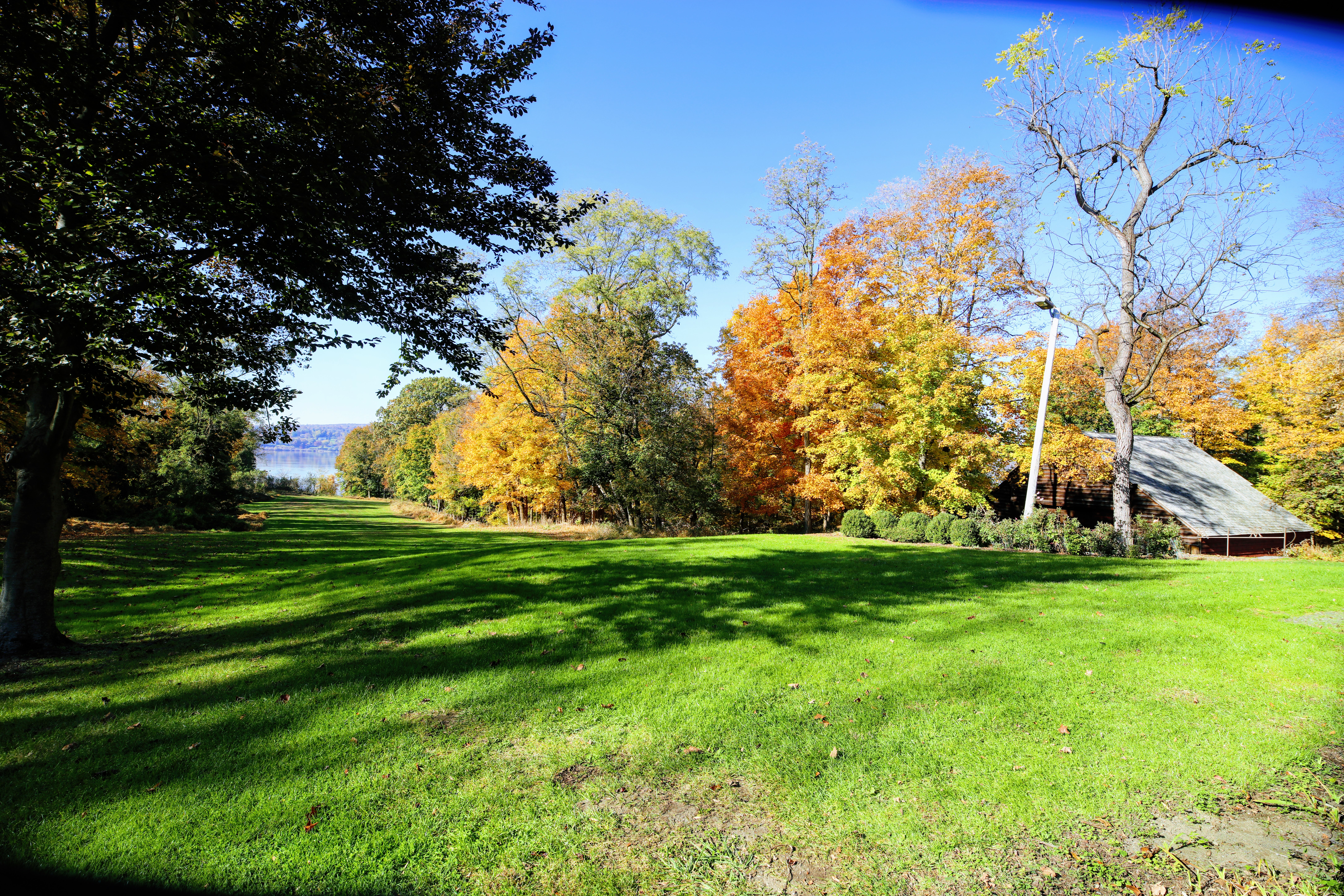
The Verplanck house view of the Hudson River and barn.

The original mansion was destroyed in a fire laid by an arsonist in 1931. After this, the ruin of the house was left unattended until 1966, when Bache Bleecker, a descendant of the Verplanck family, and his wife Connie founded the Mount Gulian Society, as a nonprofit, private organization. The goal of the society was restoration of Mount Gulian which was completed in 1975. The restoration reconstructed the house to the state it was in when it served as von Steuben's headquarters. Later additions were not included in the restoration.

Since then, the building has been accessible to the public as a museum. The interior contains artifacts related to the Verplanck family. Also on the site is an 18th-century Dutch barn, which was moved to this location from Hopewell Junction. The museum is open from April through October.

== Location ==
The street address of the Mount Gulian mansion is 145 Sterling Street, Beacon, NY 12508, USA.

== See also ==
- List of Registered Historic Places in Dutchess County, New York
