= New York Bar Association =

New York Bar Association may refer to

- New York City Bar Association
- New York State Bar Association
