= Andrew Johnston (New Jersey politician) =

American politician

Speaker of the New Jersey General Assembly
- In office 1740–1744
- Governor: Lewis Morris
- Preceded by: Joseph Bonnel
- Succeeded by: Samuel Nevill

Member of the New Jersey General Assembly from the City of Perth Amboy district
- In office 1727–1729 Serving with John Johnstone
- Preceded by: Thomas Gordon
- Succeeded by: Thomas Farmar

Member of the New Jersey General Assembly from the City of Perth Amboy district
- In office 1733–1744 Serving with Gabriel Stelle, Lewis Johnston, Samuel Leonard
- Preceded by: John Johnstone
- Succeeded by: Samuel Nevill

Member of the New Jersey Provincial Council for the Eastern Division
- In office June 19, 1745 – June 24, 1762

Personal details
- Born: December 20, 1694
- Died: June 24, 1762 (aged 67) Perth Amboy, New Jersey
- Spouse: Catherine Van Cortlandt
- Relations: David Johnston (nephew)
- Children: 9
- Profession: Merchant

Andrew Johnston (December 20, 1694 – June 24, 1762) was a politician from Perth Amboy, New Jersey, who served in the New Jersey General Assembly and the New Jersey Provincial Council.

== Early life ==
Andrew Johnston was born on December 20, 1694, to John Johnstone (1661-1732) and Euphame Johnstone (née Scot). His maternal grandfather was George Scot of Pitlochie. The children of John Johnstone dropped the final "e" from their name. His elder brother, John Johnston, was the father of prominent merchant and politician David Johnston.

== Career ==
Until approximately 1717/8, he was a merchant in New York City, subsequently relocating to Perth Amboy, New Jersey.

Johnston represented the City of Perth Amboy with his father in the ninth New Jersey General Assembly (1727–1729 Legislative Session). After the elder Johnstone's death in 1732, Andrew Johnston took his father's seat in the tenth Assembly for the 1733 seating. After this, the Assembly did not meet until 1738, when Governor Lewis Morris called new elections and the eleventh Assembly was seated. Johnston would serve in the eleventh, twelfth and thirteenth Assemblies (1738–1744), and was Speaker during the twelfth and thirteenth. (1740–1744)

After his service in the General Assembly, on June 19, 1745, Johnston was appointed a member of the New Jersey Provincial Council, where he would serve until his death.

In 1747, Andrew Johnston was serving as Mayor of Perth Amboy, New Jersey.

In 1748/9, he was named Treasurer of the College of New Jersey.

== Perth Amboy Constituency ==
In 1702, the royal instructions to Governor Viscount Cornbury named the Town of Perth Amboy as a constituency, apportioned two members to the New Jersey General Assembly. In 1718, Perth Amboy was granted city status; the same apportionment continued until the adoption of the New Jersey Constitution of 1776, which apportioned the entire New Jersey Legislature by county, thereby abolishing separate representation for cities.

== Personal life ==
He married Catherine Van Cortlandt, the daughter of Stephanus Van Cortlandt (1643–1700) and Gertruj Van Schuyler. Van Schuyler was the daughter of Philip Pieterse Schuyler (1628-1683) and the older sister of Pieter Schuyler (1657-1724), the first mayor of Albany. Together, Andrew and Catherine had:

- John Johnston
- Stephen Johnston
- Anne Johnston
- Gertrude Johnston
- Catherine Johnston
- Margaret Johnston
- Elizabeth Johnston
- Mary Johnston
- Euphemia Johnston, who married her first cousin, John Johnston, a Colonel of the New Jersey Provincial troops at the capture of Fort Niagara during the French and Indian War in 1758.

Andrew died on June 24, 1762, in Perth Amboy, New Jersey.
