= John Johnstone (mayor) =

American politician

33rd Mayor of New York City
- In office 1714–1719
- Preceded by: Caleb Heathcote
- Succeeded by: Jacobus Van Cortlandt

Member of the New York General Assembly
- In office 1709–1710

New York Provincial Council
- In office 1720–1723
- Preceded by: Samuel Staats
- Succeeded by: William Provost

Speaker of the New Jersey General Assembly
- In office 1721–1722
- Governor: William Burnet
- Preceded by: John Kinsey
- Succeeded by: William Trent

Speaker of the New Jersey General Assembly
- In office 1725–1729
- Governor: William Burnet, John Montgomerie
- Preceded by: William Trent
- Succeeded by: John Kinsey, Jr.

Member of the New Jersey General Assembly from the City of Perth Amboy district
- In office 1710–1714 Serving with John Reid
- Preceded by: Thomas Gordon
- Succeeded by: Thomas Farmar

Member of the New Jersey General Assembly from the City of Perth Amboy district
- In office 1721–1732 Serving with Andrew Redford, Samuel Leonard, Andrew Johnston
- Preceded by: John Harrison
- Succeeded by: Andrew Johnston

Personal details
- Born: c. 1661 Ochiltree, Scotland
- Died: 3 September 1732 Perth Amboy, Province of New Jersey, British America
- Resting place: St. Peter's Episcopal Church
- Spouse: Euphame Scot
- Relations: David Johnston (grandson)
- Children: 13 including Andrew Johnston
- Profession: Druggist, physician

John Johnstone (c. 1661 – 3 September 1732) was the 33rd Mayor of New York City from 1714 to 1719.

== Career ==
An associate of George Scot of Pitlochie, he was a druggist from Edinburgh and emigrated to the Thirteen Colonies in 1685 aboard the Henry and Francis. Scot himself died on board the ship.

In New Jersey, he was known as Dr. Johnstone.

In 1686, Johnstone was granted a tract of 500 acres by the East New Jersey Proprietors on account of his wife and another 30,000 acres in 1701. In spite of his investment in East New Jersey land, John Johnstone eventually settled in New York and was elected to the New York General Assembly, serving in 1709 and 1710. Between 1710 and 1714 Johnstone represented Perth Amboy in the New Jersey General Assembly. By 1714 he was mayor of New York City, in which office he served until 1719.

He was first recommended to the Crown for the New York Provincial Council by Governor Robert Hunter in 1715 to fill a vacancy caused by the death of Dr. Samuel Staats. Johnstone was finally appointed in 1720, but by 1722 Hunter's successor, William Burnet, complained that Dr. Johnstone had "without any leave obtained under the Hand and seal of any Governor or president, now resided for above two years last past in New Jersey", and asked for his removal from the Council. In July 1723 he was replaced by William Provost.

Governor Burnet had first-hand knowledge of Johnstone's New Jersey residency, as he served as governor of both New York and New Jersey simultaneously. John Johnstone had returned to the New Jersey General Assembly in 1721, again representing Perth Amboy. He served as Speaker for most of that time, from 1721 through 1722, and again from 1725 through 1729, with the interim occupied by William Trent. He remained in the Assembly until his death on September 3, 1732.

== Marriage and children ==
In 1686, Johnstone was married to Euphame Scot, the daughter of George Scot of Pitlochie. Together, they were the parents of Euphemia Johnston, Isabel Johnstone, Katherine Johnstone, John Johnston, Jr., Margaret Johnston, Andrew Johnston, William Johnstone, Janet, James Johnstone, George Johnston, Lewis Johnston, Isabel Johnstone, and Mary Johnston.

== Death ==
Johnstone died on 3 September 1732 in Perth Amboy, New Jersey.

Political offices
Preceded by Caleb Heathcote	Mayor of New York City; 1714–1719	Succeeded by Jacobus Van Cortlandt
