= I. B. Knickerbocker =

American politician

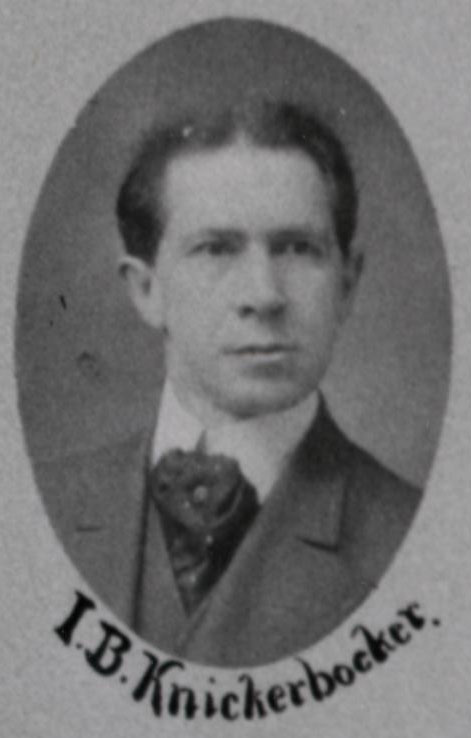
- Knickerbocker in 1907

Member of the Washington Senate from the 30th district
- In office January 14, 1907 – January 9, 1911
- Preceded by: Dr. John James Smith
- Succeeded by: B. A. Bowen

Personal details
- Born: June 1864 Cincinnatus, New York, U.S.
- Died: April 19, 1954 (aged 89) Seattle, Washington, U.S.
- Party: Republican

Irving B. Knickerbocker (June 1864 – April 19, 1954) was an American politician in the state of Washington. He served Washington State Senate from 1907 to 1911.
