= Lithgow, New York =

Hamlet in New York, United States

Coordinates: 41.83386°N 73.61309°W

Lithgow is a hamlet, in the northeastern part of the town of Washington, in Dutchess County, New York, United States. Located 4 miles (6.4 km) west of Amenia on U.S. Route 44, it is approximately 75 miles (121 km) north of New York City.

The hamlet was named for Linlithgow in Scotland.

== St. Peter's Episcopal church ==
Actresses Rachel Kempson, Lynn Redgrave and Natasha Richardson are interred in Lithgow's St. Peter's Episcopal Cemetery.
