= Daniel C. Verplanck =

American politician (1762–1834)

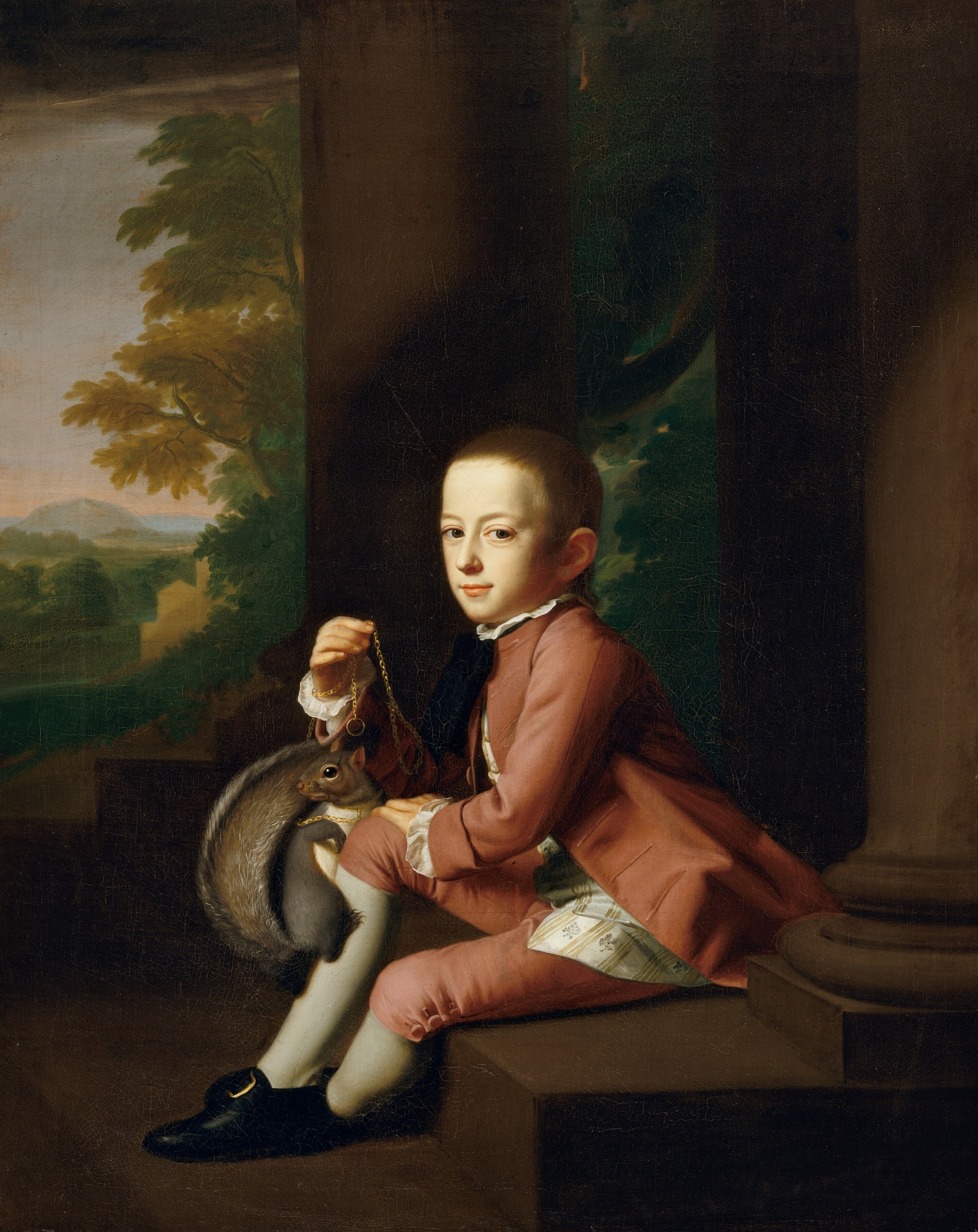
- Portrait by John Singleton Copley, 1771

Member of the U.S. House of Representatives from New York's 6th district
- In office October 17, 1803 – March 3, 1809
- Preceded by: Isaac Bloom
- Succeeded by: Herman Knickerbocker; Robert Le Roy Livingston

Personal details
- Born: March 19, 1762 New York City, Province of New York, British America
- Died: March 29, 1834 (aged 72) near Fishkill, New York, U.S.
- Party: Democratic-Republican
- Spouses: Elizabeth Johnson (m. 1785; died 1789) Ann Walton (m. 1790)
- Children: 9, including Gulian
- Parent(s): Samuel Verplanck; Judith Crommelin
- Relatives: Gulian Verplanck (uncle)
- Education: Columbia College

Daniel Crommelin Verplanck (March 19, 1762 – March 29, 1834) was an American politician who served as a United States representative from New York.

== Early life ==
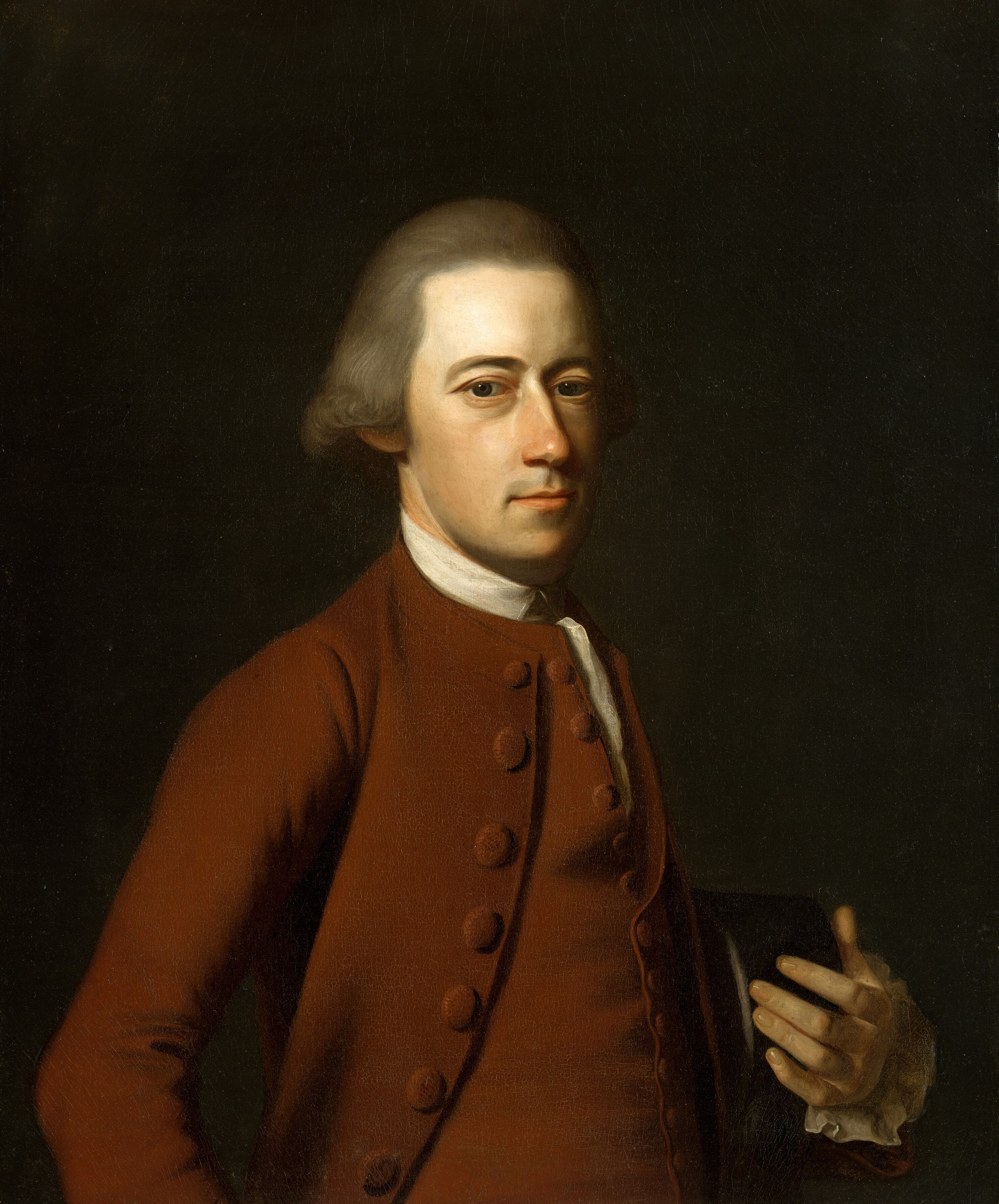
1771 portrait of Daniel's father Samuel by John Singleton Copley

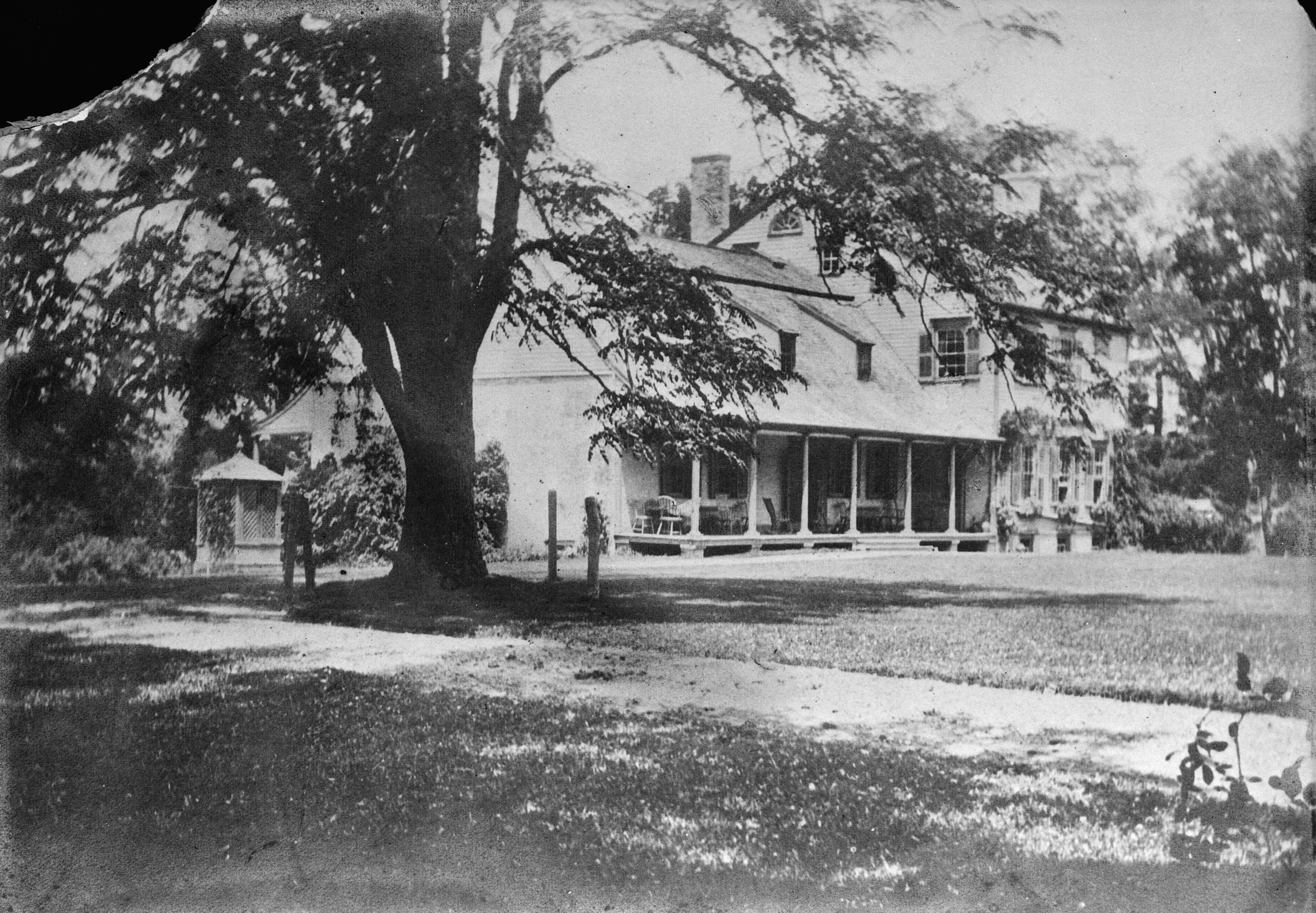
Mount Gulian, Dutchess County

Daniel Crommelin Verplanck was born in New York City in the Province of New York. He was the son of Samuel Verplanck (1739–1820), and Judith Crommelin Verplanck. His father, who was the brother of Gulian Verplanck (1751–1799), was a wholesale importer and banker. Daniel's early life was spent at the family home, a large yellow brick mansion, at 3 Wall St. His parents separated during the Revolutionary War. His father, a supporter of the Revolution, withdrew to the family summer home, up the Hudson River in the Town of Fishkill, while his mother was a loyalist and remained in New York City. The house in Fishkill became the headquarters of General Friedrich Wilhelm von Steuben.

A portrait of the nine year old Daniel Verplanck by John Singleton Copley is in the Metropolitan Museum of Art, which also has "the Verplanck Room", containing portraits and furnishings from the Wall St. house that were later moved to Fishkill. Daniel was educated under private tutors and graduated from Columbia College (later Columbia University) in New York City in 1788.

== Career ==
He studied law, was admitted to the bar and commenced practice in New York City in 1789. He also engaged in banking and was one of the original subscribers of the Tontine Coffee House. Daniel's wife Elizabeth died in 1789. The following year he married Ann Walton (familiarly called "Nancy"). After his mother's death in 1803, the Wall Street house was closed and Daniel and his family moved to Mount Gulian, In 1822, he sold the Wall Street house to the Bank of the United States for use as its New York branch.

At Mount Gulian, Verplanck kept open house summer and winter and received family members and many notable guests. On Christmas 1826, he hosted a number of West Point cadets, including Thomas Boylston Adams, Jr., grandson of John Adams, and nephew of Verplanck's neighbor Caroline Smith DeWindt. (In his 1892 The History of Abraham Isaacse Verplanck, W.E. Verplanck confuses cadet Adams with his father, Thomas Boylston Adams). Mrs. DeWindt later drowned in the 1852 Henry Clay steamboat disaster.

=== United States Congress ===
Verplanck was elected as a Democratic-Republican to the Eighth Congress to fill the vacancy caused by the death of Isaac Bloom. He was re-elected to the Ninth and Tenth Congresses and served from October 17, 1803 to March 3, 1809. He was not a candidate for renomination in 1808, and resumed the practice of law. He was judge of the Court of Common Pleas of Dutchess County, resigning his seat in 1828. From this he was in his later years, commonly called "Judge Verplanck".

== Family ==
In 1785, he married Elizabeth Johnson, the daughter of William Samuel Johnson (1727–1819), the 3rd President of Columbia College and a U.S. Senator from Connecticut, and the granddaughter of Samuel Johnson (1696–1772), the 1st President of Kings College. The couple had two children:

- Gulian Crommelin Verplanck (1786–1870), also a U.S. Representative from New York.
- Ann Verplanck (1788–1789), who died in infancy

Elizabeth Johnson Verplanck died in February 1789 at the age of twenty-five. In November 1790, Daniel Verplanck married Ann Walton, daughter of William Walton (nephew and heir of merchant William Walton) and Mary (née De Lancey) Walton. Daniel and Ann Verplanck had seven children:

- Samuel Verplanck (1792–1792), who died in infancy
- Mary Ann Verplanck (1793–1856)
- Louisa Verplanck (1796–1802)
- Samuel Verplanck (1798–1861)
- Elizabeth Verplanck (1800–1888)
- William Walton Verplanck (1803–1870)
- James DeLancey Verplanck (b. 1805)
- Anna Louisa Verplanck (1807–1836)

In 1834, Verplanck died at his home, Mount Gulian, near Fishkill; interment was in Trinity Church Cemetery, Fishkill.

== See also ==
- Mount Gulian

U.S. House of Representatives
| Preceded by Isaac Bloom | Member of the U.S. House of Representatives from New York's 6th congressional district 1803–1809 | Succeeded by Herman Knickerbocker and Robert Le Roy Livingston |
