= Gulian Verplanck (speaker) =

American banker and politician

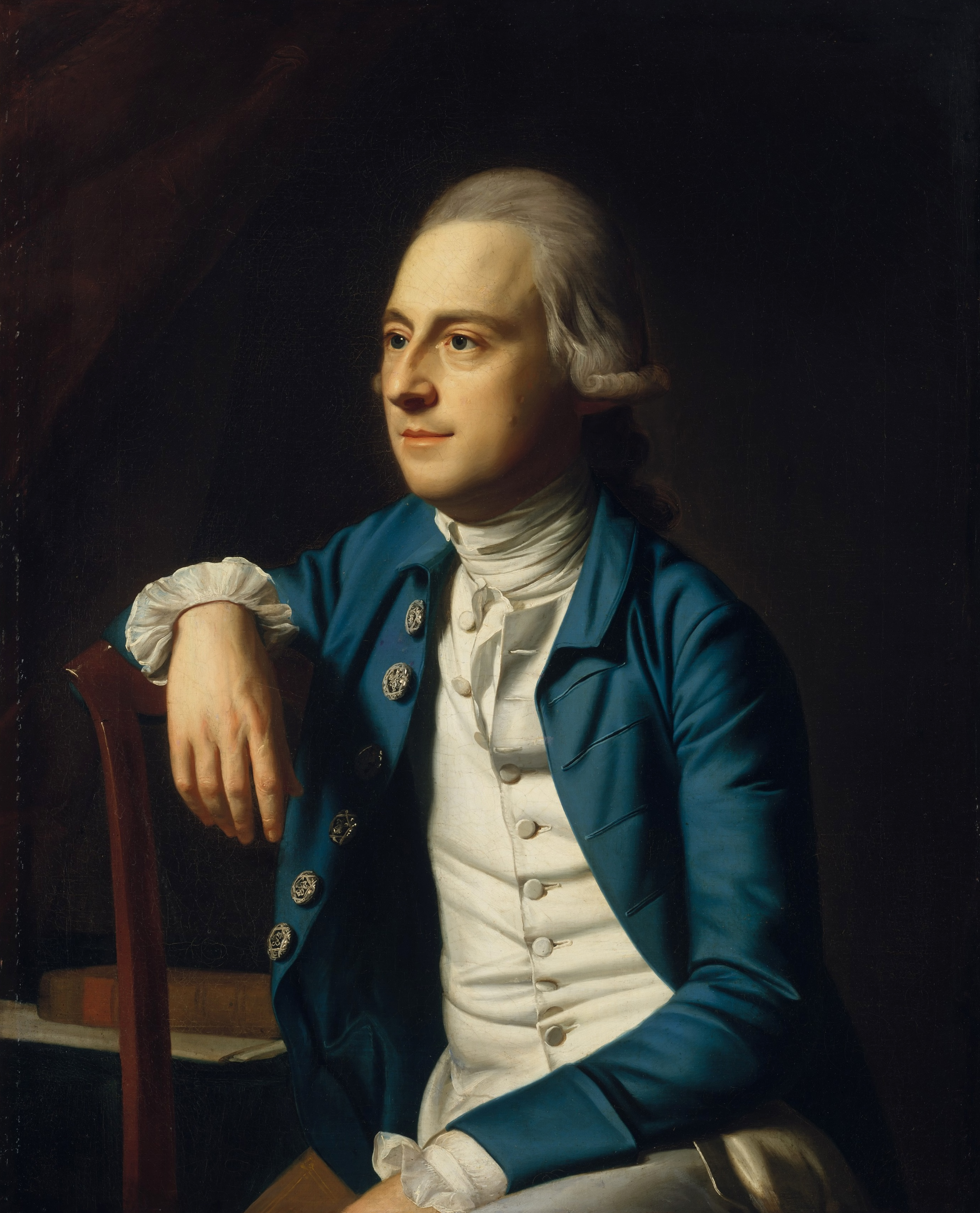
- Portrait by John Singleton Copley, 1771

Speaker of the New York State Assembly
- In office 1796–1797
- Preceded by: William North
- Succeeded by: Dirck Ten Broeck
- In office 1789–1790
- Preceded by: John Lansing Jr.
- Succeeded by: John Watts

Personal details
- Born: February 10, 1751
- Died: November 20, 1799 (aged 48)
- Party: Federalist
- Spouse: Cornelia Johnston
- Children: 7
- Parent(s): Gulian Verplanck; Mary Crommelin
- Relatives: Daniel Ludlow (cousin); Daniel C. Verplanck (nephew); Gulian Crommelin Verplanck (great-nephew)
- Education: King's College
- Occupation: American politician

Gulian Verplanck (February 10, 1751 – November 20, 1799) was an American banker and politician.

== Early life ==
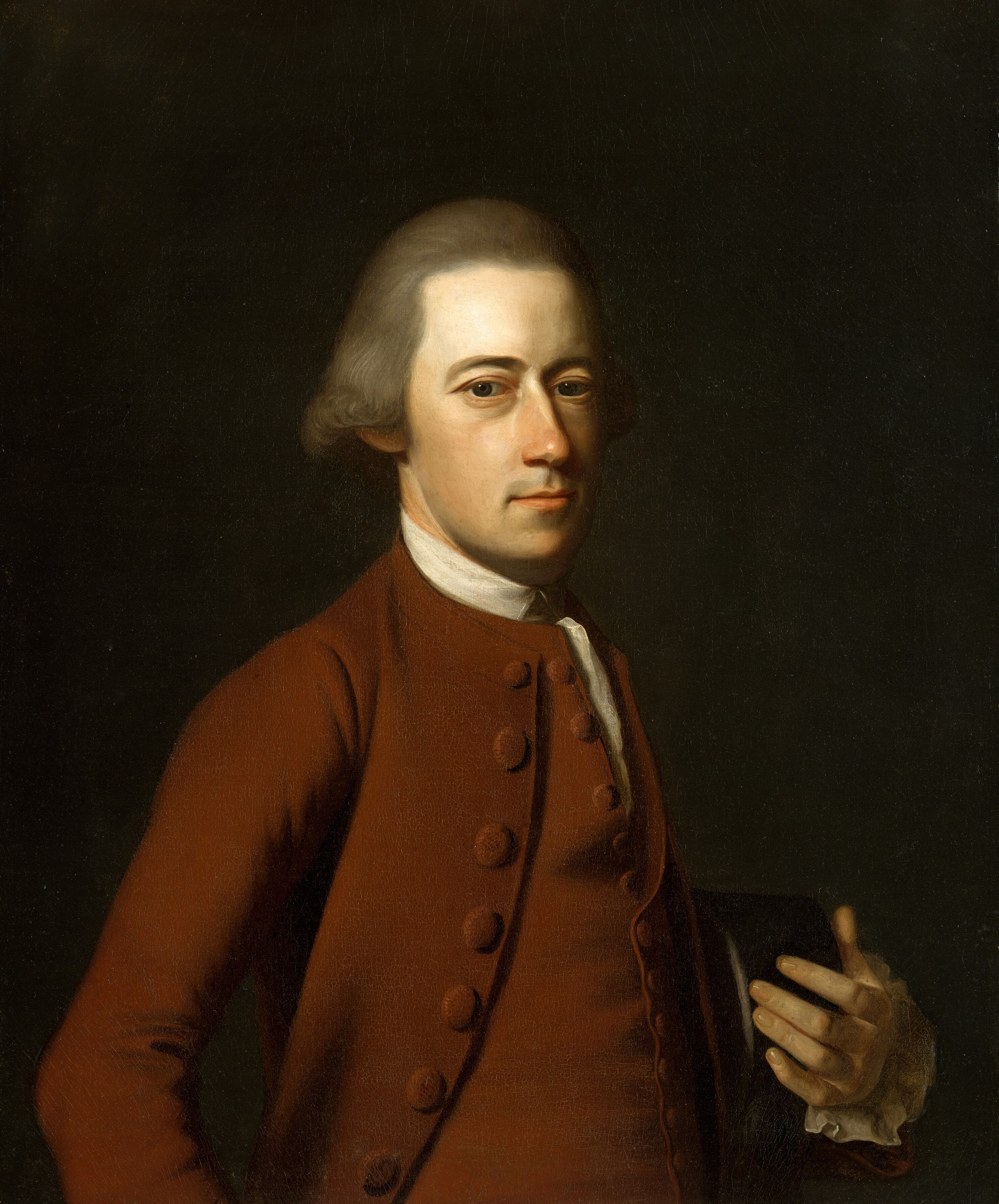
1771 portrait of his brother Samuel by John Singleton Copley

Verplanck was born in February 1751 and was only nine months old when his father died. He was the youngest of the six children of Gulian Verplanck (1698–1751) and Mary (née Crommelin) Verplanck, who married in 1737. His father had been a fourth generation New Yorker who owned significant property and amassed a considerable fortune.

His maternal grandfather was Charles Crommelin, a wealthy merchant who dealt in commerce between New York and Holland. Through his brother Samuel (who married their Dutch cousin Judith Crommelin), he was an uncle of Daniel C. Verplanck and great-uncle of Gulian Crommelin Verplanck, both members of the U.S. House of Representatives. Through his maternal aunt, Elizabeth (née Crommelin) Ludlow, he was a first cousin of Daniel Ludlow, the first president of the Manhattan Company, which was founded in 1799 by Aaron Burr to rival Alexander Hamilton's Bank of New York and the New York branch of the First Bank of the United States.

He attended and graduated from King's College in 1768 alongside Bishop Benjamin Moore and Gouverneur Morris.

== Career ==
After graduating from King's College in 1768, his elder brother sent him to Holland to acquire practical experience in mercantile and banking procedures by working at his uncle's firm, Daniel Crommelin and Sons. After returning to New York, he was one of the most prominent merchants in the city and had extensive dealings with Holland.

"When the Duke of Clarence, then a young midshipman, afterward William IV, was in New York, Gulian Verplanck was his associate, skated with him upon the Collect, and rescued him from drowning when he fell through a hole in the ice."

He was a Federalist member from New York County of the New York State Assembly, and was Speaker from 1789 to 1790 and again from 1796 to 1797.

On March 30, 1790, he replaced John Jay as one of the Regents of the University of the State of New York. In 1792, he became President of the Bank of New York, serving until his death in 1799, and helped found the Tontine Association, a precursor of the New York Stock Exchange.

== Personal life ==
In 1784 he married Cornelia Johnston, a daughter of merchant David Johnston. They lived in New York with their seven children in the vicinity of Riverside Drive and 123rd Street. Among his children were:

- Maria Cornelia Verplanck (1785–1825), who married William Allen.
- David Johnston Verplanck (1789–1829), who was active in Federalist politics and was a editor of the New York American, later ran by Charles King. He married Louisa Augusta Gouverneur, a daughter of merchant Nicholas Gouverneur.
- Emily Verplanck (1791–1869), who married Claude Sylvaine Guillard in 1822.

Verplanck died on November 20, 1799, in New York. Two years after his death, his widow married George Cairnes, the Reporter of the Supreme Court of New York State.

Political offices
Preceded by John Lansing Jr.	Speaker of the New York State Assembly; 1789–1790	Succeeded by John Watts
Preceded by William North	Speaker of the New York State Assembly; 1796–1797	Succeeded by Dirck Ten Broeck
