= New-York American, for the Country =

U.S. newspaper (1819–1845)

The New-York American, also known as the New York American, for the Country, was a semi-weekly (and sometimes an evening daily) newspaper published in New York City from 1819 to 1845. The first issue appeared in March 1819 under the title The American, under which name it published for its first two years. Shortly after its establishment it became one of the "front rank" of media outlets of the period.

The key editors were Charles King and David Johnston Verplanck. Another key editor was Charles Fenno Hoffman (1830–33), who signed some of his articles with an asterisk. James A. Hamilton, son of Alexander Hamilton, was reportedly involved at the beginning. As of 1837, their offices were at 74 Cedar Street in what is now the Financial District.

The N.Y. American typically supported Republican, National Republican, and Whig candidates for office. The paper was an "important" voice for John Quincy Adams in 1828.
