= Herman Knickerbocker =

American politician (1779–1855)

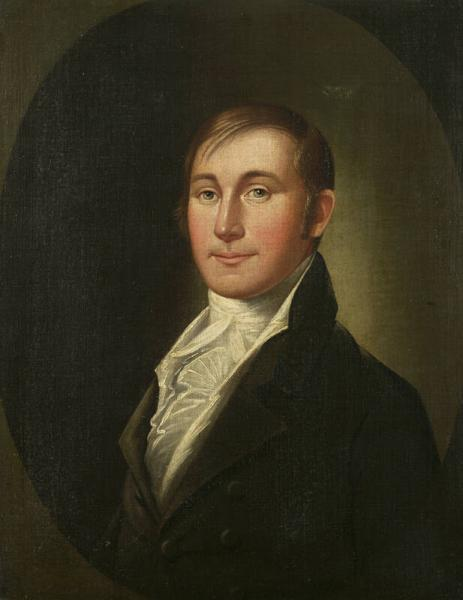

Member of the U.S. House of Representatives from New York's 6th district
- In office March 4, 1809 – March 3, 1811
- Preceded by: Daniel C. Verplanck
- Succeeded by: Asa Fitch; Robert Le Roy Livingston

Personal details
- Born: July 27, 1779 Albany, New York
- Died: January 30, 1855 (aged 75) Williamsburg, New York
- Party: Federalist
- Spouse: Mary Delia Buell
- Children: 13, including David
- Parent: Johannes Knickerbocker

Herman Knickerbocker (also Harman, Harmen; also Knikkerbakker, Knickerbacker; July 27, 1779 – January 30, 1855) was a United States representative from New York.

== Early life ==
Herman Knickerbocker was born in Albany on July 27, 1779. He was the son of Johannes Knickerbocker (1749–1827). His grandfather, Colonel Johannes Knickerbocker, who was the commander of the 14th Regiment of the Albany County militia during the American Revolution, was a grandson of Harmen Jansen Knickerbocker, of Friesland, the Netherlands, one of the earliest settlers of New York.

Knickerbocker completed preparatory studies, studied law in the offices of John Vernon Henry and John Bird, was admitted to the bar in 1803 and commenced practice in Albany. He moved to Schaghticoke (near Albany) and became known as "the Prince of Schaghticoke" because of his hospitality and liberality.

== Military service ==
Knickerbocker served in the militia in the early 1800s. Initially appointed the commander of a cavalry troop with the rank of captain, in 1810 he was promoted to major in New York's 3rd Cavalry Regiment. According to an 1816 newspaper article from Troy, New York, Knickerbocker was still active in the militia as the commander of a squadron in the 3rd Regiment, and led it during its annual muster and parade.

== Career ==
Knickerbocker served on several occasions as Schaghticoke's town supervisor, including 1805 to 1806, 1813, 1818 to 1823, and 1825 to 1826.

In 1808, Knickerbocker was elected as a Federalist to the Eleventh Congress, holding office from March 4, 1809, to March 3, 1811. During his term, Knickerbocker was concerned chiefly with alleviating the effects of the Jefferson administration's Embargo Act of 1807. According to a newspaper article that appeared in 1833, his maiden speech argued against the embargo, and he described the economic and financial condition of his constituents caused by the embargo so dramatically that the members of the House were reduced to convulsions of laughter. Knickerbocker was not a candidate for reelection in 1810 and opposed U.S. involvement in the War of 1812. He served in the New York State Assembly in 1816. Knickerbocker became an adherent of Andrew Jackson in the mid 1820s, and joined the Democratic Party. He was judge of the Rensselaer County court from 1828 to 1838.

== Personal life ==
In 1801 he married Arietta Lansing, the daughter of Abraham Lansing and Else Van Rensselaer. They had five children before her death in 1814. Four of his daughters attended the Troy Female Seminary:

- Abraham Lansing Knickerbocker (b. 1802)
- Elizabeth Maria Knickerbocker (b. 1805)
- Catharine Knickerbocker (b. 1808)
- Rebecca Knickerbocker (b. 1813)

In December 1814 he married Rachel Wendell, daughter of John H. Wendell, an officer in the Revolution, and Catherine Van Benthuysen. Together, they had five children:

- Arietta Knickerbocker (b. 1815)
- Cathalina Wendell Knickerbocker (b. 1817)
- Maria Van Veghten Knickerbocker (b. 1819)
- John Knickerbocker (b. 1821), who died in childhood
- Rachel Jane Knickerbocker (b. 1822)

On July 20, 1826, he married Mary Delia Buel, who was born in Litchfield, Connecticut, and was the daughter of David Buel and Rachel McNeil. Together, they had:

- Sarah Bird Knickerbocker, who married Reverend Samuel Haskins
- Charlotte Knickerbocker
- David Buel Knickerbacker (1833–1894), who maintained the original spelling of the family name, graduated at Trinity College in 1853 and at the General Theological Seminary in 1856, was a rector for many years at Minneapolis, Minnesota, and in 1883 was consecrated Protestant Episcopal bishop of Indiana.
- Herman Knickerbocker

Knickerbocker died in Williamsburg, New York, in 1855, and is interred in the Knickerbocker family cemetery, Schaghticoke.

=== Legacy ===
Through his friend Washington Irving borrowing his name for a fictional figure, Diedrich Knickerbocker, he gave rise to the name Knickerbockers for a kind of trousers. During one of Irving's visits to Washington to meet President James Madison, he introduced Knickerbocker to the President as "My cousin Diedrich Knickerbocker, the great historian of New York."

U.S. House of Representatives
Preceded by Daniel C. Verplanck	Member of the U.S. House of Representatives from New York's 6th congressional district 1809–1811 with Robert Le Roy Livingston	Succeeded by Asa Fitch, Robert Le Roy Livingston
