= David Buel Knickerbacker =

American Episcopal clergyman

The Right Reverend David Knickerbacker D.D.
- Bishop of Indiana
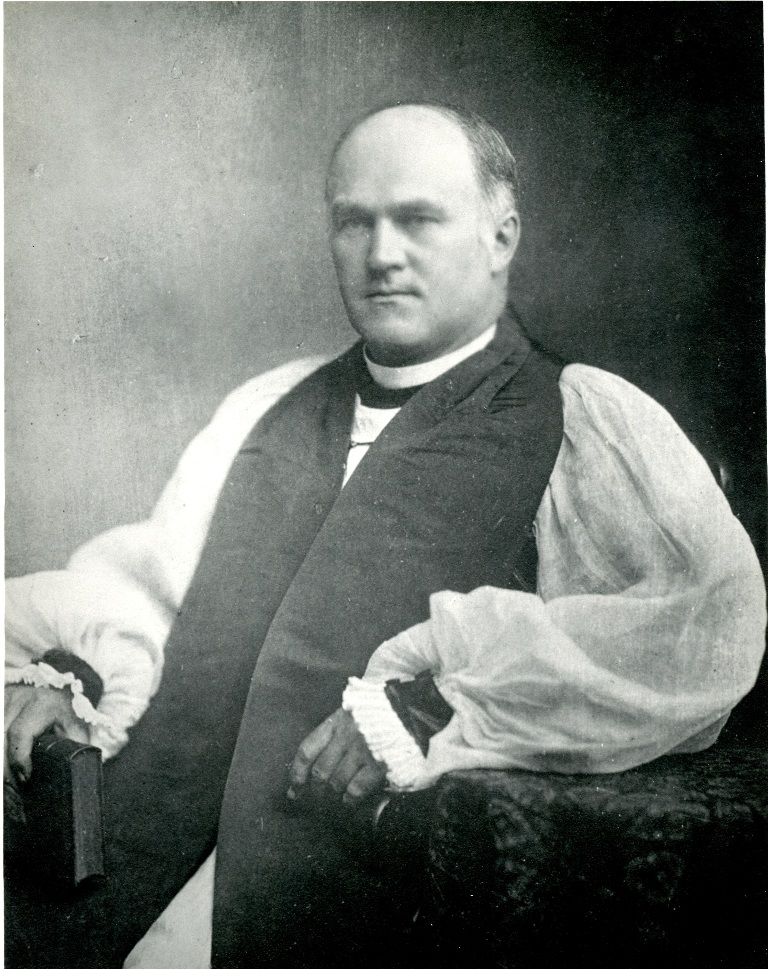
- Church: Episcopal Church
- Diocese: Indiana
- Elected: 1883
- In office: 1883–1894
- Predecessor: Joseph Cruickshank Talbot
- Successor: John Hazen White

Orders
- Ordination: July 12, 1857 by Jackson Kemper
- Consecration: October 14, 1883 by Arthur Cleveland Coxe

Personal details
- Born: February 24, 1833 Schaghticoke, New York, United States
- Died: December 31, 1894 (aged 61) Indianapolis, Indiana, United States
- Buried: Crown Hill Cemetery and Aboretum, Section 14, Lot 74
- Parents: Herman Knickerbocker & Mary Delia Buell
- Spouse: Sarah M. Moore
- Children: 2
- Education: Trinity College, Hartford

David Buel Knickerbacker (February 24, 1833 – December 31, 1894), was an American Episcopal clergyman who in 1883 became the fourth bishop of the Episcopal Diocese of Indiana and 130th bishop in the line of succession in the American episcopate.

== Early life and education ==
Born on February 24, 1833, at Schaghticoke, Rensselaer County, New York, he was the son of Mary Delia (Buell) Knickerbocker and her husband Herman Knickerbocker, a lawyer and former Congressman from New York. David Buel Knickerbocker was educated at Trinity College, Hartford and the General Theological Seminary in New York City.

== Ministry ==
Soon after his graduation from seminary in 1856 he went as a missionary to Minneapolis Minnesota, then a village of three hundred people, and remained there 27 years, during which time he did much to direct its growth. He built three churches there, including Gethsemane Episcopal Church, and five in its outlying districts. He founded Cottage Hospital (1870), the first hospital in the city of Minneapolis, which was moved and renamed St. Barnabas Hospital (1871–1991), which ultimately was closed and sold in 1991 to Hennepin County Medical Center, and the Sheltering Arms Hospital. In 1877 he was elected missionary bishop of New Mexico and Arizona but declined.

After becoming the fourth bishop of Indiana in 1883, he founded a boarding school for boys at Turner and another for girls in Indianapolis and secured $25,000 toward an endowment for the Diocese of Indiana. He also founded the Church Worker, a monthly publication of which he was editor. He received the honorary degree of Doctor of Divinity from Trinity College in 1871.

== Family ==
He was married to Sarah (Moore) Knickerbocker in Brooklyn, New York, in the summer of 1856. They had two children. Their daughter died of illness in Minneapolis in 1865, at the age of seven, and their son David was killed when attempting to jump on railcars at the St. Paul & Pacific depot in the fall of 1866. Bishop Knickerbacker died December 31, 1894, in Indianapolis and was buried next to his wife in Crown Hill Cemetery.
