= Harmen Jansen Knickerbocker =

Colonial Dutch colonist (1648–1720)

Harmen Jansen Knickerbocker (c. 1648 – c. 1720) was a Dutch colonist associated with the settlements of Albany (formerly Beverwyck and Fort Orange), Schaghticoke, Red Hook and Tivoli and in New Netherland.

== Surname and Dutch Origins ==
It appears to be the case that he never used the surname Knickerbocker, as we know it, during his own lifetime; that he went by a variety of surnames including Van Bommel, and the variety of forms that would evolve into Knickerbacker towards the end of his life, and Knickerbocker after his death. Very occasionally the name Van Wye or Van Wijhe appears as part of the evolving name, or in addition to it, and Van Alstyne says this indicates he came from Wijhe.

Knickerbocker 'probably arrived in New Netherland/New York sometime in 1674 during the brief re-occupation of the colony by the Dutch in the third Dutch-Anglo War. First addressed as Van Bommel in Albany City records, it is fairly certain that he came from the general region called Bomlerswardt, lying between the Dutch fortified towns of Bommel-Zoutbommel and Maas Bommel.' If, indeed, Knickerbocker did come to the colony from the Bommel area, then it is much less clear why he's twice identified as being 'Van Wijhe"; perhaps, he'd lived in the tiny village of Wijhe, in Overijssel province, as well; perhaps, as some family historians claim, his family roots are associated with the village and a family of minor nobility originating there.

Historians associated with Castle Wijenburg, a Wijhe family holding in Echteld, Netherlands, have observed, "In the USA, the family Knickerbocker circulates a pedigree in which they (possibly) descend from Roelof van Wijhe of the Arnhem van Wijhe branch. We have not found any evidence for this. In this Knickerbocker family tree Roelof van Wijhe has a son Johannes van Wijhe (van Bommel) who married Jannetje Jansen from Masterlandt. Their son was Harmen Jansen van Wye (or Wijhe) who arrived in the USA in 1674 and in 1682 signed a contract with the name "van Wyekycback". This name then became Knickerbocker in America." In 2016 castle historians indicated they've been researching the history of both the castle and the family for more than a decade and state: " Roelof had two daughters but we've never found any proof for a son" and "We have never found any proof for a link between the Knickerbocker family and the Van Wijhes from Echteld."

== Family ==
Harmen married Elizabeth Bogaert, the daughter of Jan Bogaert and Cornelia Everts of Harlem, New York. Before 1682, Harmen settled near what is now Albany, New York, and there in 1704 he bought through Harnie Gansevoort one-fourth of the land in Dutchess County near Red Hook, New York, which had been patented in 1688 to Pieter Schuyler.

In 1722, Schuyler deeded seven (of thirteen) lots in the upper fourth of his patent to the seven children of Knickerbacker. The eldest of these children, Johannes Harmensen, received from the common council of the city of Albany a grant of 50 acres (200,000 m^{2}) of meadow and some acres of upland on the south side of Schaghticoke Creek. This Schaghticoke estate was held by Johannes Harmensen's son Johannes (1723–1802), a colonel in the Continental Army in the War of Independence, and by his son Herman, (1779–1855), a lawyer, a Federalist Party (United States) representative in Congress in 1809-1811, a member of the New York Assembly in 1816, and a famous gentleman of the old school, who for his courtly hospitality in his manor was called the "prince of Schaghticoke," and whose name was borrowed by Washington Irving for use in his (Diedrich) Knickerbocker's History of New York (1809).

Largely owing to Irving's book, the name Knickerbacker/Knickerbocker has passed into current use as a designation of the early Dutch settlers in New York and their descendants. Herman's son David Buel Knickerbacker (1833–1894), who maintained the original spelling of the family name, graduated at Trinity College in 1853 and at the General Theological Seminary in 1856. He was a rector for many years at Minneapolis, Minnesota, and in 1883 was consecrated Protestant Episcopal bishop of Indiana.
