= Jotham Post Jr. =

American politician (1771–1817)

Member of the U.S. House of Representatives from New York's 2nd district
- In office March 4, 1813 – March 3, 1815
- Preceded by: William Paulding, Jr. Samuel L. Mitchill
- Succeeded by: William Irving; Peter H. Wendover

Personal details
- Born: April 4, 1771 Westbury, Province of New York, British America
- Died: May 15, 1817 (aged 46) New York City, New York, U.S.
- Party: Federalist
- Spouses: Magdalena Blaau (m. 1792; died 1811) Julia Strong Wattles (m. 1815)
- Relations: Wright Post (brother); Henry A. V. Post (grandson); Gertrude Rhinelander Waldo (granddaughter)
- Parent(s): Jotham Post Sr. Winifred Wright Post
- Education: Columbia College

Jotham Post Jr. (April 4, 1771 – May 15, 1817) was a U.S. representative from the state of New York, United States.

== Early life ==
Post was born near Westbury, New York on April 4, 1771. He was the son of Jotham Post Sr. (1740–1817), with whom he was very close, and his wife, Winifred (née Wright) Post (1745–1811). His older brother was Dr. Wright Post, a professor of surgery and anatomy at Columbia.

He graduated from Columbia College in New York City, in 1792.

== Career ==
He studied medicine, but did not practice, instead, he engaged in the drug-importing business in New York City. He served as member of the board of aldermen. He served in the State assembly 1795 and 1805–1808. He served as director of the New York Hospital from 1798 to 1802.

Post was elected as a Federalist to the Thirteenth Congress, serving from March 4, 1813 to March 3, 1815.

== Personal life ==
On August 10, 1792, Post was married to Magdalena Blaau in New York City. Together, they had eight children, including:

- Waldron Blaau Post (1793–1874), who married Sarah Elizabeth Parker.
- Ur Post (1795–1796), who died young.
- Julia Lynch Post (1797–1878), who married James DeWolf Jr., a son of politician James DeWolf, in 1815.
- Eleanor Post (1799–1872), who married Francis LeBaron DeWolf, also a son of politician James DeWolf, in 1820. After his death, she married John Whipple in 1839.
- Jotham William Post (1801–1841), who married Angelina Thayer Byers.
- Edwin Augustus Post (1804–1888), who married Lucretia Ann Main (1792‒1863). After her death, he married Cornelia Davis.
- Nancy Elizabeth Mary Post (1806–1895), who married Bernard Rhinelander (1800–1844).
- Magdalen Rachel Post (1810–1841), who married Isaac Gibson.

After the death of his first wife in 1811, Jotham married Julia Strong on October 2, 1815 in Albany, New York. She was the widow of George Wattles.

Post died in New York City, May 15, 1817.

=== Descendants ===
Notable descendants include Henry A. V. Post, Albertson Van Zo Post, Henry Post, journalist Robert Post, Regis Henri Post, Mason Sears, and Gertrude Rhinelander Waldo, and Rhinelander Waldo.

U.S. House of Representatives
Preceded by William Paulding, Jr., Samuel L. Mitchill	Member of the U.S. House of Representatives from New York's 2nd congressional district 1813–1815 with Egbert Benson 1813 and William Irving 1814–1815	Succeeded by William Irving, Peter H. Wendover
