= Alexander Mackintosh =

American architect

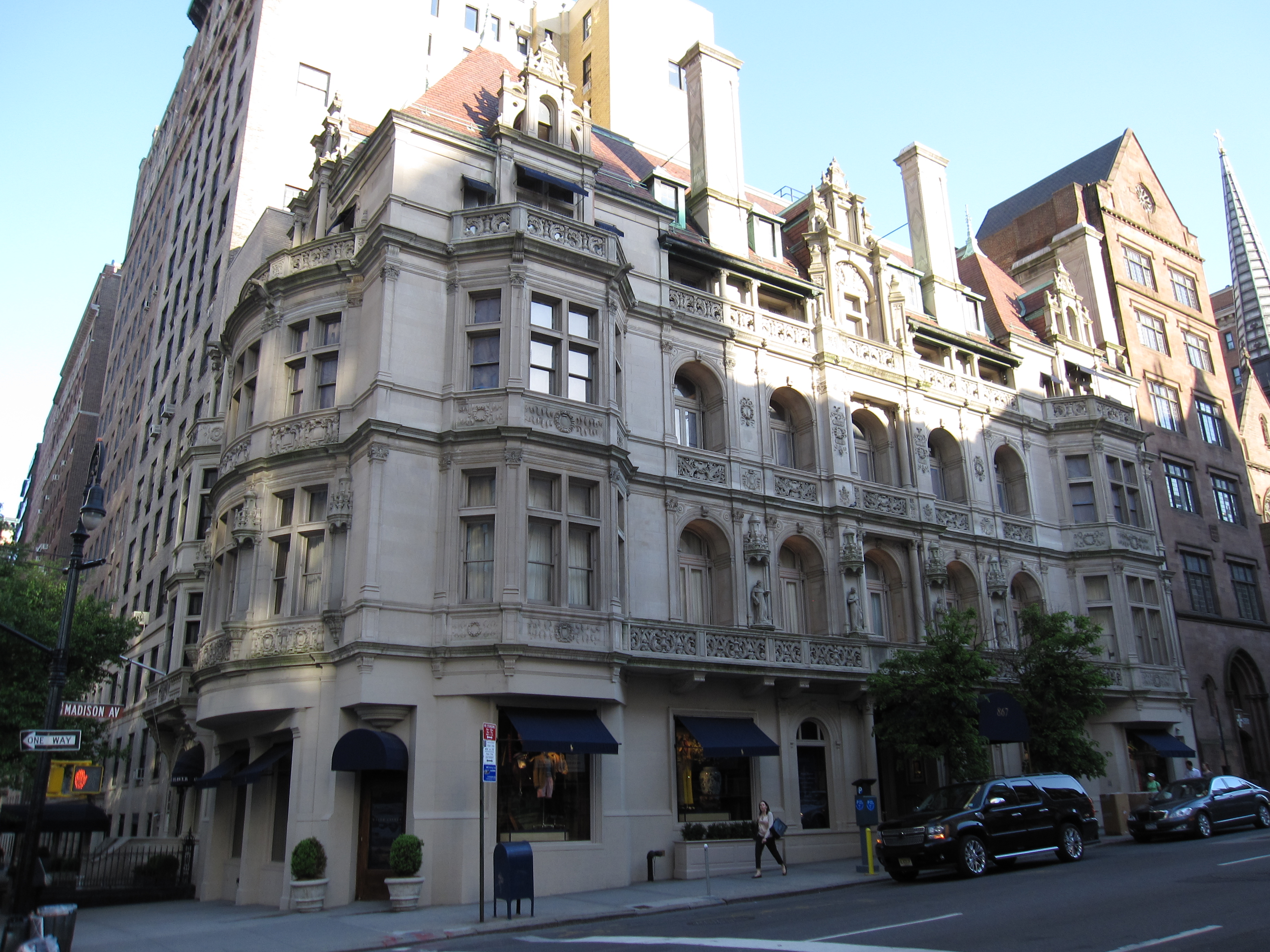
- Gertrude Rhinelander Waldo Mansion, View from Madison Avenue, 867 Madison Ave. New York, NY
- Born: 2 October 1861; London, England
- Died: 1945 (aged 83–84)
- Known for: Architect

Alexander Mackintosh (2 October 1861 — 1945) was an American architect and architectural designer active in New York City from the 1890s until his death.

== Early life ==
Macintosh was born in London, England to Alexander Mackintosh and his wife, the former Elizabeth Smith.

== Career ==
According to Mackintosh's entry in the 1918 Who's Who in New York City and State, he worked for various British architects between 1878 and 1892 and won several architectural prizes, including the Sir William Tite's Prize from the Royal Institute of British Architects in 1891. Mackintosh worked for prominent British architect Sir Aston Webb before immigrating to the United States in January 1893.

After moving to the United States, he worked for Kimball & Thompson, a New York City firm, from 1893 until it disbanded in 1898, and then opened his own business. Among the Kimball & Thompson projects on which Mackintosh worked were a French Renaissance Revival mansion for Gertrude Rhinelander Waldo (1898); alterations to the B. Altman department store (1896); and the Empire Building (1895).

== Works as Alexander Mackintosh ==
As head of his own firm, Mackintosh's projects included:

- Kearny Town Hall, Kearny, New Jersey
- Coit Building, Paterson, New Jersey
- L'Enfant Building, Paterson, New Jersey
- All Angels Church, Twilight Park, Haines Falls, New York (1910)
- An unbuilt plan for the Brooklyn County Courthouse (1910)
- North Side Bank, 225-227 Havemeyer Street, Brooklyn, New York (1913)
- Underhill House, the Oyster Bay, New York, estate of John Slade (circa 1918)
- The Mountain Country Club, Twilight Park, Haines Falls, New York (1932)

== Personal life ==
Mackintosh became a naturalized American citizen on or about 14 October 1903. Mackintosh married Jeannette Eliza Day, daughter of Augustus P. Day of Brooklyn, New York, on 6 December 1911. They had one child, Alexander Day Mackintosh (1912 — 1989).

Alexander Mackintosh died at his home in Long Branch, New Jersey, on August 2, 1945, at age 83.
