= Salmagundi (periodical) =

19th-century American satirical periodical

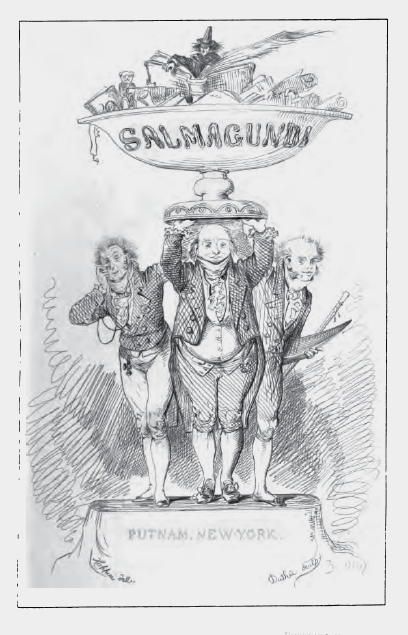
- From an 1869 reprint
- Author: Washington Irving (with James Kirke Paulding and William Irving, Jr.)
- Original title: Salmagundi; or The Whim-whams and Opinions of Launcelot Langstaff, Esq. & Others
- Language: English
- Genre: Satire
- Publisher: David Longworth (New York City)
- Publication date: 1807-1808
- Publication place: United States
- Media type: Print (Periodical)
- ISBN: 978-0-940450-14-1 (reprint)
- OCLC: 9412147
- Dewey Decimal: 818/.209 19
- LC Class: PS2052 1983

Salmagundi; or The Whim-whams and Opinions of Launcelot Langstaff, Esq. & Others, commonly referred to as Salmagundi, was a 19th-century satirical periodical created and written by American writer Washington Irving, his oldest brother William, and James Kirke Paulding. The collaborators produced twenty issues at irregular intervals between January 24, 1807 and January 15, 1808.

== History ==
Irving and a few friends formed a group known as the "Lads of Kilkenny", described as “a loosely knit pack of literary-minded young blades out for a good time.” When they weren't spending time at the Park Theatre or the Shakespeare Tavern at the corner of Nassau and Fulton Streets in Lower Manhattan, they gathered at an old family mansion on the Passaic River in Woodside, Newark, New Jersey which Gouverneur Kemble had inherited and which they called "Cockloft Hall".

Besides Irving, the group included his brothers William, Peter, and Ebenezer; and the Kemble brothers, Gouverneur and Peter. William Irving was married to Julia Paulding, sister of his friend James Kirke Paulding. Paulding was married to the Kemble's sister Gertrude. Some of them eventually organized to create the literary magazine called Salmagundi.

Salmagundi lampooned New York City culture and politics in a manner much like today's Mad magazine. It was in the November 11, 1807, issue that Irving first attached the name Gotham to New York City, based on the alleged stupidity of the people of Gotham, Nottinghamshire.

Irving and his collaborators published the periodical using a wide variety of pseudonyms, including Will Wizard, Launcelot Langstaff, Pindar Cockloft, and Mustapha Rub-a-Dub Keli Khan.

Irving and Paulding discontinued Salmagundi in January 1808, following a disagreement with publisher David Longworth over profits.
