= William Paulding Jr. =

American politician (1770–1854)

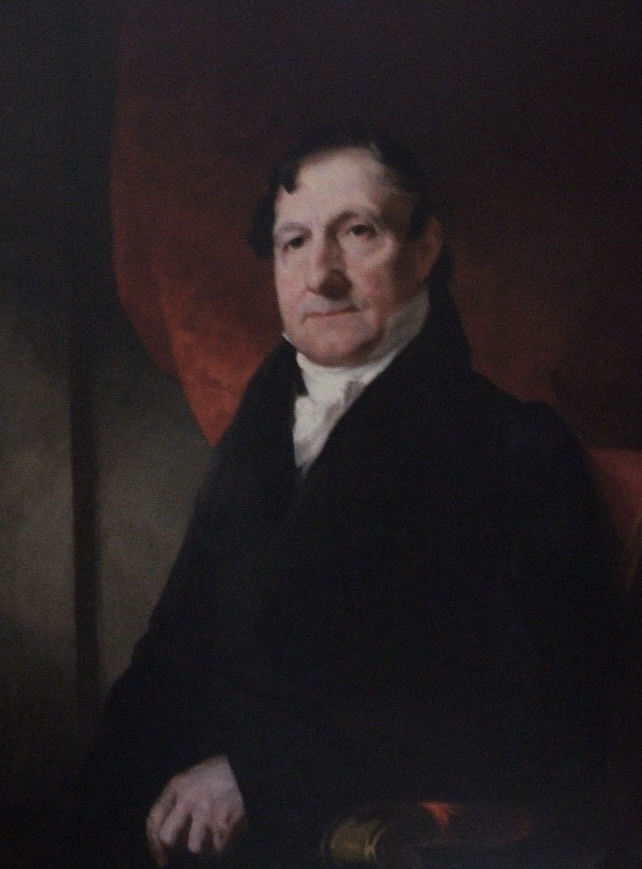
- Portrait by Samuel Morse, c. 1823

57th and 59th Mayor of New York City
- In office 1827–1829
- Preceded by: Philip Hone
- Succeeded by: Walter Bowne
- In office 1825–1826
- Preceded by: Stephen Allen
- Succeeded by: Philip Hone

Member of the U.S. House of Representatives from New York's 2nd district
- In office March 4, 1811 – March 3, 1813
- Preceded by: Gurdon S. Mumford
- Succeeded by: Egbert Benson

4th and 6th Adjutant General of New York
- In office 1809–1810
- Preceded by: Solomon van Rensselaer
- Succeeded by: Solomon van Rensselaer
- In office 1811–1813
- Preceded by: Solomon van Rensselaer
- Succeeded by: Solomon van Rensselaer

Personal details
- Born: March 7, 1770 Philipsburg Manor, Province of New York, British America (the present-day Tarrytown, New York area)
- Died: February 11, 1854 (aged 83) Tarrytown, New York, U.S.
- Party: Democratic-Republican
- Spouse: Maria Rhinehander
- Relations: James Kirke Paulding (brother)
- Children: Frederick W. Paulding

William Paulding Jr. (March 7, 1770 – February 11, 1854) was a United States representative from New York and the 57th and 59th mayor of New York City. He was the adjutant general of New York for two non-consecutive terms.

== Early life ==
Paulding was born in the Upper Mills section of colonial Philipsburg Manor (the present-day Tarrytown area) in the Province of New York on March 7, 1770. He was a son of William Paulding Sr. (1735–1835), a wealthy shop owner and Revolutionary War veteran, and the brother of Julia Paulding (wife of U.S. Representative William Irving, brother of Washington Irving), Catharine Paulding (wife of Mordecai Hale, a surgeon's mate), and James Kirke Paulding, the United States Secretary of the Navy under President Martin Van Buren. Paulding was a cousin of Revolutionary War hero John Paulding, one of the captors of Major John André. Paulding's ancestors were among the early Dutch settlers of the area.

== Career ==
He completed preparatory studies, studied law, was admitted to the bar and commenced practice in New York.

He was elected as a Democratic-Republican to the Twelfth Congress, holding office from March 4, 1811, to March 3, 1813, and was a brigadier general of the New York militia. He served in the War of 1812 and was a delegate to the New York constitutional convention in 1821.

Paulding was Adjutant General of New York. He served two non-consecutive terms as Mayor of New York City, from 1825 to 1826 and again from 1827 to 1829.

== Personal life ==
Paulding was married to Maria Rhinelander (1784–1851). Together, they were the parents of:

- Frederick W. Paulding (1811–1858), the father of Julia Rhinelander Paulding who married Col. Richard Irving Dodge.

He purchased a summer estate in the Tarrytown area, where he was born, and built a mansion there, designed by Alexander Jackson Davis in 1838. He called the house Knoll, but it was often referred to as "Paulding's folly" because of its unusual design that included fanciful turrets, pointed arches, and an asymmetrical outline, all of which was unlike most homes of the time. It was later renamed Lyndhurst and donated by its last owner, railroad tycoon Jay Gould's daughter Anna Gould, to the National Trust for Historic Preservation. The estate was designated a National Historic Landmark in 1966.

He died in his Knoll mansion on February 11, 1854, and was buried in the Paulding family vault at the Old Dutch Burying Ground in Sleepy Hollow, New York.

=== Legacy ===
Paulding Avenue in The Bronx is named after him.

U.S. House of Representatives
Preceded by Gurdon S. Mumford, Samuel L. Mitchill	Member of the U.S. House of Representatives from New York's 2nd congressional district 1811–1813 with Samuel L. Mitchill	Succeeded by Egbert Benson, Jotham Post Jr.
Political offices
Preceded by Stephen Allen	Mayor of New York City; 1825–1826	Succeeded by Philip Hone
Preceded by Philip Hone	Mayor of New York City; 1827–1829	Succeeded by Walter Bowne
