= James Church Cropsey =

American judge (1872–1937)

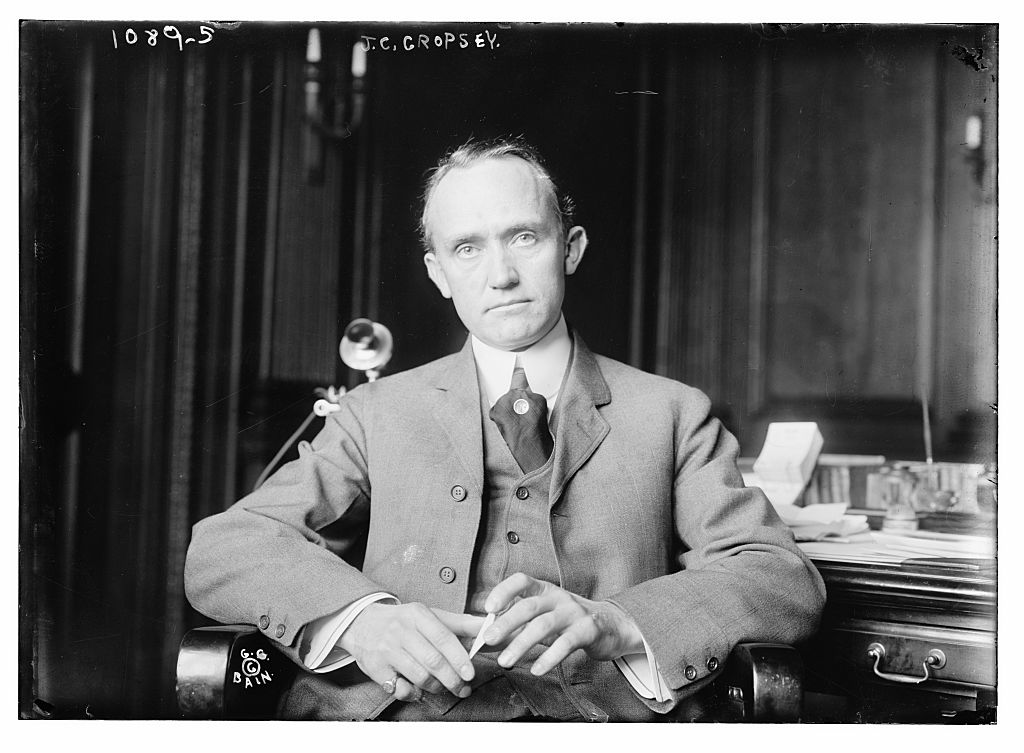

James Church Cropsey (1872 - June 16, 1937) was a New York City Police Commissioner and a New York State Supreme Court judge.

== Literature ==
- Whalen, Bernard; Whalen, Jon (2015). The NYPD's First 50 Years: Politicians, Police Commissioners, and Patrolmen. Potomac Books, Inc. pp. 68–70. ISBN 9781612346564.

Police appointments
Preceded by William Baker	NYPD Commissioner; 1910–1911	Succeeded by Rhinelander Waldo
Legal offices
Preceded by John F. Clarke	Kings County District Attorney; 1912–1916	Succeeded by Harry E. Lewis
