= Temple Bowdoin =

American businessman

- Born: July 14, 1863; Irvington, New York, U.S.
- Died: December 2, 1914 (aged 51); New York, New York, U.S.
- Education: Columbia University
- Occupation: Stockbroker
- Spouse: Helen Parish Kingsford (m. 1894; died 1912)
- Children: George Temple Bowdoin
- Parent(s): George Sullivan Bowdoin; Julia Irving Grinnell
- Relatives: William Irving (great-grandfather); James Alexander Hamilton (great-grandfather); Moses H. Grinnell (grandfather)

Temple Bowdoin (July 14, 1863 – December 2, 1914) was an American businessman. While an associate of J.P. Morgan & Company, he was elected a member of the New York Stock Exchange in 1909.

== Early life and education ==
He was born at Wolfert's Dell, Irvington, New York. He was the son of Julia Irving (née Grinnell) Bowdoin (1838–1915) and George Sullivan Bowdoin (1833–1913). His father was a banker who was a partner in Drexel, Morgan & Co. and a direct descendant of James Bowdoin, 2nd Governor of Massachusetts and namesake of Bowdoin College, founded by his son James Bowdoin III. His siblings were Fanny Hamilton Bowdoin (1866–1894), who married Daniel Parish Kingsford (1858–1949), and Edith Grinnell Bowdoin (1869–1943).

His paternal grandparents were George Russell James Bowdoin (1809–1870) and Frances "Fanny" (née Hamilton) Bowdoin (1813–1887). Through his paternal grandfather, he was a descendant of the Dudley-Winthrop family and through his paternal grandmother, he was the great-grandson of James Alexander Hamilton (1788–1878) and the great-great-grandson of Alexander Hamilton, the Founding Father and first Treasury Secretary of the United States, and Elizabeth Schuyler Hamilton, of the prominent Schuyler family. Through his mother, he was a descendant of Congressman Moses H. Grinnell, formerly the Collector of the Port of New York, as well as a descendant of Congressman William Irving and author Washington Irving.

Temple Bowdoin graduated from Columbia College in 1885.

== Career ==
After college, Bowdoin spent several years traveling and then entered the banking business, clerking as a lawyer for four years at Winslow, Lanier & Co. He joined J. P. Morgan & Co. in January 1891 and, two years later, was made a partner and put in charge of monitoring the firm's books, which he did until his death in 1914.

He was in charge of the accounting business of J.P. Morgan & Company. Bowdoin was connected to Morgan for 25 years and a partner for 15 years. He was a director of the Niagara Development Company, Niagara Falls Power Company, and the Niagara Junction Railway Company.

In his will, he left all the employees of Morgan & Co. in New York and of Drexel & Co. in Philadelphia one month's salary, and those who had been in his personal service for a year or more, one year's salary.

=== Social activities ===
He belonged to The Metropolitan Club, University Club of New York, New York Yacht Club, Union Club of the City of New York, St. Anthony Club, Tennis Ardsley Club, Baltusrol Golf Club, and the Automobile Club of America.

In 1892, Bowdoin was included in Ward McAllister's "Four Hundred", purported to be an index of New York's best families, published in The New York Times.

== Personal life ==
On April 4, 1894, he was married to Helen Parish Kingsford (1863–1912). She was the daughter of Mary P. and John J. Kingsford of London, England, and the sister of Bowdoin's brother-in-law. Together, they were the parents of:

- Fanny Kingsford Bowdoin (1895–1899), who died young.
- George Temple Bowdoin (1898–1967), who served as the first mayor of Oyster Bay Cove, New York in 1932 and was elected to the Board of NYU in 1940.
- John Temple Bowdoin (1900–1902), who also died young.

His wife died on August 9, 1912. Bowdoin died at his home at 104 East 37th St. on December 2, 1914, following an operation for an intestinal disorder. J.P. Morgan & Company closed for a time on the day of his death, out of respect. He was survived by a son, George Temple Bowdoin, then a student at Groton School. His estate was valued at $6,187,708, the bulk of which was left to his son. His son was also heir to his grandmother's estate upon her death in 1915.
