= James Kirke Paulding =

American government official (1778–1860)

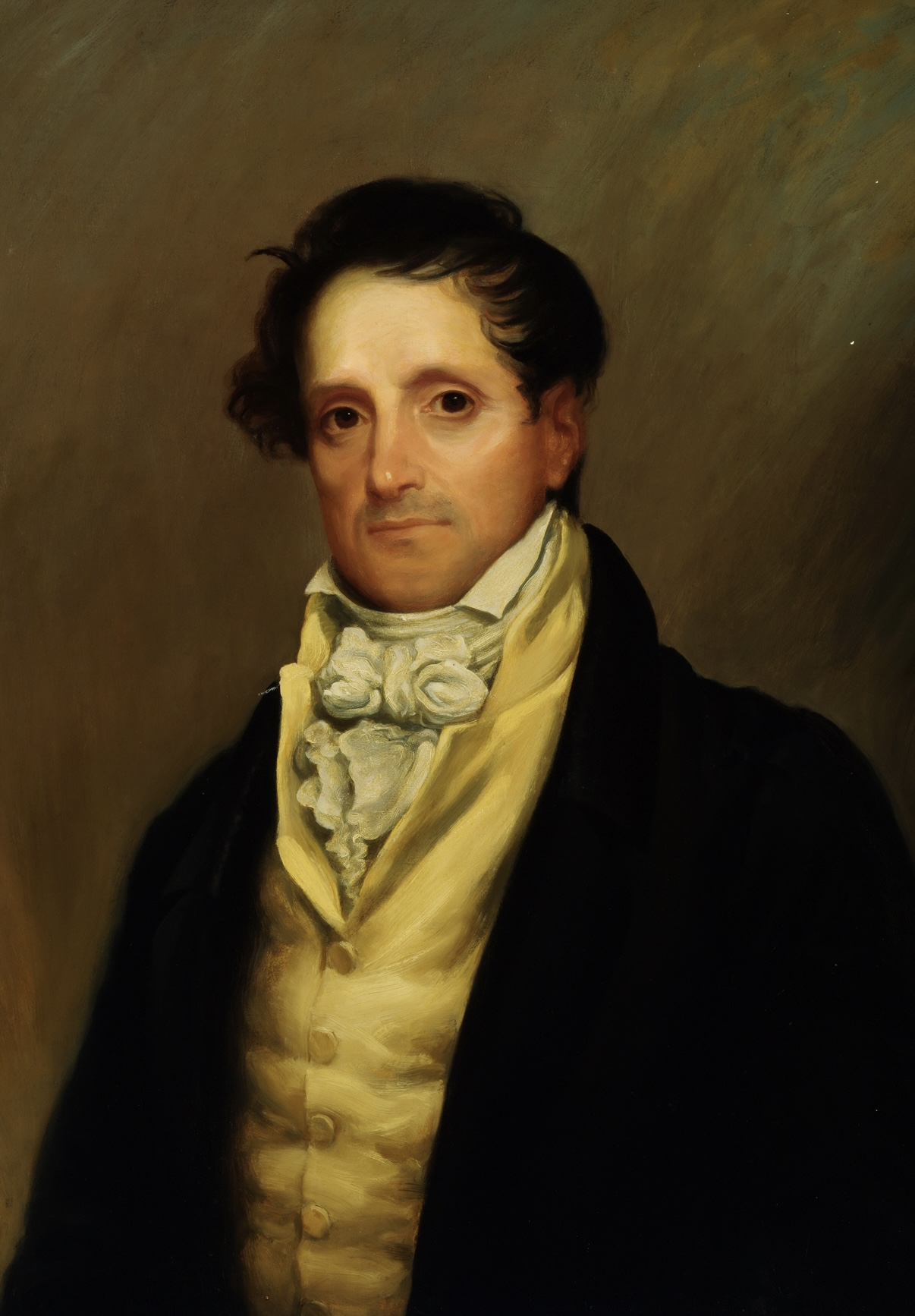

11th United States Secretary of the Navy
- In office July 1, 1838 – March 4, 1841
- President: Martin Van Buren
- Preceded by: Mahlon Dickerson
- Succeeded by: George E. Badger

Personal details
- Born: August 22, 1778 Pleasant Valley, New York, U.S.
- Died: April 6, 1860 (aged 81) Hyde Park, New York, U.S.
- Party: Democratic-Republican (Before 1825); Democratic (1825–1860)
- Spouse: Gertrude Kemble
- Relations: William Paulding (brother)

James Kirke Paulding (August 22, 1778 – April 6, 1860) was an American writer and, for a time, the United States Secretary of the Navy. Paulding's early writings were satirical and violently anti-British, as shown in The Diverting History of John Bull and Brother Jonathan (1812). He wrote numerous long poems and serious histories. Among his novels are Konigsmarke, the Long Finne (1823) and The Dutchman's Fireside (1831). He is best known for creating the inimitable Nimrod Wildfire, the "half horse, half alligator" in The Lion of the West (1831), and as collaborator with William Irving and Washington Irving in Salmagundi. (1807–08). Paulding was also, by the mid-1830s, an ardent and outspoken defender of slavery who later endorsed southern secession from the United States.

== Biography ==
James Kirke Paulding was born on August 22, 1778, at Pleasant Valley, Dutchess County, New York. His parents were William Paulding and Catherine Ogden. Paulding was chiefly self-educated.

He became a close friend of Washington Irving. With Irving, Paulding proposed a literary project. As he described, "one day in a frolicsome mood, we broached the idea of a little periodical merely for our own amusement, and that of the town, for neither of us anticipated any further circulation." The result was Salmagundi; a short-lived satirical periodical, from which the word 'Gotham' was first ascribed as a name for New York City.

Along with Irving, Paulding was associated with the "Knickerbocker Group", a group which also included William Cullen Bryant, Gulian Crommelin Verplanck, Fitz-Greene Halleck, Joseph Rodman Drake, Robert Charles Sands, Lydia Maria Child, and Nathaniel Parker Willis.

Paulding's other writings also include The Diverting History of John Bull and Brother Jonathan (1812), a satire, The Dutchman's Fireside (1831), a romance which attained popularity, A Life of Washington (1835), and some poems. Extracts from his epic poem The Backwoodsman (1818) were popularly reprinted throughout his life. In the decade before Washington Irving and James Fenimore Cooper achieved popular success, Paulding experimented in every genre in an effort to forge a new American literature. Thereafter, his outstanding contributions were in the novel and in a stage comedy. Koningsmarke (1823), which he began as a spoof of Walter Scott's historical romances, took unexpected hold of his imagination and became a well-turned novel, notable for memorializing the Revolt of the Long Swede and for its portrait of an old black woman that anticipates William Faulkner and for its sympathetic yet unromanticized depiction of the Indian. The Lion of the West (1831), selected in a play competition in which William Cullen Bryant was one of the judges, presented a cartoon of Davy Crockett; it was the most-often performed play on the American stage before Uncle Tom's Cabin, and an altered version enjoyed success in London. Paulding's View of Slavery in the United States (1836) was a comprehensive defense of both Black slavery and America's claim to be a bastion of liberty against the attacks of abolitionists and European critics. Writer and critic John Neal in his 1824–25 critical work American Writers dubbed Paulding one of only three authors (along with himself and Charles Brockden Brown) to exhibit an authentically American style.

Among Paulding's government positions were those of secretary to the Board of Navy Commissioners in 1815–23 and Naval Agent in New York in 1824–38. President Martin Van Buren appointed him Secretary of the Navy in June 1838. As Secretary, he was a conservative figure, whose extensive knowledge of naval affairs was balanced by notable lack of enthusiasm for new technology. He opposed the introduction of steam-propelled warships declaring that he would "never consent to let our old ships perish, and transform our Navy into a fleet of (steam) sea monsters." Nevertheless, his tenure was marked by advances in steam engineering, wide-ranging exploration efforts, enlargement of the fleet and an expansion of the Navy's apprenticeship program.

In 1839, Paulding was elected as a member to the American Philosophical Society.

Paulding left office with the change of administrations in March 1841, returned to literary pursuits and took up agriculture. He died at his farm near Hyde Park, New York. He is interred at Green-Wood Cemetery in Brooklyn, New York.

USS James K. Paulding (DD-238) was named in honor of Secretary of the Navy Paulding.

== Personal life ==
Paulding married Gertrude Kemble (d. 1841) on 15 November 1818. Gertrude was the daughter of New York merchant Peter Kemble and the sister of U.S. congressman Gouverneur Kemble. They had four sons:

- Peter Kemble Paulding (1819–1900)
- William Irving Paulding (1825–1890)
- Gouverneur Paulding (1829–1913)
- James Nathaniel Paulding (1833–1898)

His brother, William Paulding Jr., became a two-term mayor of New York City. His sister, Julia, married William Irving, brother of author Washington Irving.

== Oft-quoted phrase ==
Paulding's story, "The Politician" contains a maxim that is often attributed to Samuel Gompers: "Reward your friends and punish your enemies." The story appears in his collection, Tales of the Good Woman, by a Doubtful Gentleman. The same basic idea (a definition of justice as doing good to friends and harm to enemies), appears in Plato's dialogue, the Republic, where it is subsequently rejected as inadequate.

== Important works ==
- 1807–1808 – Salmagundi (with Washington Irving)
- 1812 – The Diverting History of John Bull and Brother Jonathan
- 1813 – The Lay of the Scottish Fiddle
- 1818 – The Backwoodsman
- 1820 – Salmagundi. Second Series
- 1822 – A Sketch of Old England by a New England Man
- 1823 – Koningsmarke, the Long Finne
- 1825 – John Bull in America, or the New Munchausen
- 1826 – The Merry Tales of the Three Wise Men of Gotham
- 1828 – The New Mirror for Travellers
- 1829 – Tales of the Good Woman, by a Doubtful Gentleman
- 1830 – Chronicles of the City of Gotham
- 1831 – The Dutchman's Fireside
- 1832 – Westward Ho!
- 1835 – Life of George Washington, in two volumes
- 1836 – View of Slavery in the United States
- 1836 – The Book of St. Nicholas
- 1838 – A Gift from Fairy Land
- 1846 – The Old Continental, or the Price of Liberty
- 1846- "The Vroucocolas"
- 1849 – The Puritan and his Daughter

== Legacy and honors ==
- The World War II Liberty Ship SS James K. Paulding was named in his honor.

Government offices
| Preceded by Mahlon Dickerson | United States Secretary of the Navy; 1838–1841 | Succeeded by George E. Badger |
