= Henry Meigs =

American politician (1782–1861)

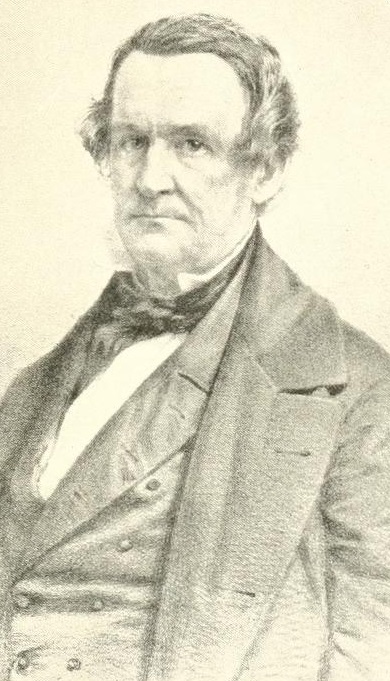

Member of the U.S. House of Representatives from New York's 2nd district
- In office March 4, 1819 – March 3, 1821 Serving with Peter H. Wendover
- Preceded by: William Irving; Peter H. Wendover
- Succeeded by: John J. Morgan; Churchill C. Cambreleng

Member of the New York State Assembly
- In office 1818

Personal details
- Born: October 28, 1782 New Haven, Connecticut, U.S.
- Died: May 20, 1861 (aged 78) New York City, U.S.
- Party: Democratic-Republican
- Children: Henry
- Parent(s): Josiah Meigs; Clara Benjamin
- Education: Yale College
- Profession: Politician, lawyer

Military service
- Allegiance: United States
- Rank: Adjutant
- Battles/wars: War of 1812

Henry Meigs (October 28, 1782 – May 20, 1861) was a U.S. representative from New York.

Born in New Haven, Connecticut, the son of Josiah Meigs and Clara (Benjamin) Meigs, Meigs attended the common schools. He was graduated from Yale College in 1799. He studied law. He was admitted to the bar and commenced practice in New York City. He served in the War of 1812 with the rank of adjutant. He served as member of the state assembly in 1818.

Meigs was elected as a Democratic-Republican to the Sixteenth Congress (March 4, 1819 – March 3, 1821). He served as chairman of the Committee on Expenditures on Public Buildings (Sixteenth Congress). He served as president of the board of aldermen of New York City in 1832 and 1833. He served as judge of one of the city courts and afterward clerk of the court of general sessions.

Meigs was elected recording secretary of the American Institute of the City of New York in 1845, and retained this position in connection with the secretaryship of the Farmers' Club until his death. He died in New York City on May 20, 1861. According to Congressional records, he was interred in St. Ann's Churchyard, Perth Amboy, New Jersey, but church records record that he was originally buried in St. Luke's in New York City and later moved to St. Peter's Churchyard in Perth Amboy.

His son, Henry Meigs Jr. was the first mayor of Bayonne, New Jersey, and the president of the New York Stock Exchange.

U.S. House of Representatives
Preceded by William Irving, Peter H. Wendover	Member of the U.S. House of Representatives from New York's 2nd congressional district 1819–1821 with Peter H. Wendover	Succeeded by John J. Morgan, Churchill C. Cambreleng
