= William Irving (American politician) =

American politician

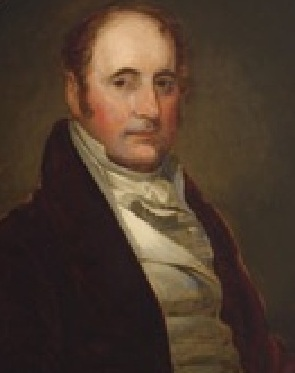
- Portrait by Thomas Sully, c. 1815

Member of the U.S. House of Representatives from New York's 2nd district
- In office January 22, 1814 – March 3, 1819
- Preceded by: Egbert Benson; Jotham Post, Jr.
- Succeeded by: Henry Meigs; Peter H. Wendover

Personal details
- Born: August 15, 1766 New York City, Province of New York, British America
- Died: November 9, 1821 (aged 55) New York City, New York, U.S.
- Resting place: Sleepy Hollow Cemetery, New York
- Party: Democratic-Republican
- Spouse: Julia Paulding (m. 1793)
- Relations: Washington Irving (brother); Peter Irving (brother); Temple Bowdoin (great-grandson)
- Parent(s): William Irving Sr. Sarah Sanders Irving

William Irving Jr. (August 15, 1766 – November 9, 1821) was an American politician who served three terms as a United States representative from New York from 1814 to 1819.

He was the eldest brother of author Washington Irving.

== Early life ==
Irving was born in New York City on August 15, 1766. William was the eldest surviving son of eleven children born to William Irving Sr. (1731–1807), originally of Quholm, Shapinsay, Orkney, Scotland, and Sarah (née Sanders) Irving (1738–1817). Among his surviving siblings were four brothers and three sisters, including: author and a member of the New York State Assembly Peter Irving, Ebenezer Irving, John Treat Irving, diplomat and author Washington Irving, Ann Irving (wife of Maj. Gen. Richard Dodge), Catherine Irving, and Sarah Irving.

== Career ==
After completing preparatory studies, Irving joined his father in the mercantile business. From 1787 to 1791, he was a fur trader with the Iroquois people along the Mohawk River, residing at Johnstown and Caughnawaga.

In 1793, he returned to New York City and, along with his brothers Peter and John, joined the Calliopean Society, a literary club for young men.

=== Congress ===
He married, and in 1814 was elected as a Democratic-Republican to the Thirteenth Congress to fill the vacancy caused by the resignation of Egbert Benson. He was reelected to the Fourteenth and Fifteenth Congresses and served from January 22, 1814, to March 3, 1819. During this time, Irving maintained a friendship with Captain Edmund Fanning, another New York resident and neighbor. Irving, also a close friend of James Kirke Paulding, Secretary of the Navy under Martin Van Buren, supported the War of 1812.

Irving contributed several essays and poems to Salmagundi, written primarily by Washington Irving and James Kirke Paulding.

== Personal life ==
In 1793, Irving was married to Julia Paulding (1768–1823), the daughter of William Paulding Sr. (one of the first members of the Provincial Congress), and sister of his friend James Kirke Paulding and William Paulding Jr. (a U.S. Representative, Mayor of New York City, and Adjutant General of New York). Together, they were the parents of:

- Lewis Graham Irving (1795–1879), who married Maria Carleton Hale (1797–1869) in 1823.
- Oscar Irving (1800–1865), who married Catharine E. C. Dayton (1800–1842) in 1827. After her death, he married his first cousin Eliza Dodge (1801–1887) in 1844.
- Pierre Munro Irving (1802–1876), who married Margaret Ann Berdan (d. 1832) in 1829. After her death, he married his first cousin Helen Dodge (1802–1885), sister of Eliza Dodge, in 1836.
- Julia Irving (1803–1872), who married fellow U.S. Representative Moses Hicks Grinnell (1803–1877).
- Henry Ogden Irving (1807–1869), an 1833 Columbia graduate.

Irving died in New York City on November 9, 1821.

=== Descendants ===
Through his daughter Julia, he was the grandfather of Julia Grinnell Bowdoin (1838–1915), the mother of prominent banker Temple Bowdoin, and Fannie Leslie Grinnell (1842–1887), who married society man Thomas Forbes Cushing, son of John Perkins Cushing.

== Notes ==
U.S. House of Representatives
| Preceded by Egbert Benson; Jotham Post, Jr. | Member of the U.S. House of Representatives from New York's 2nd congressional district 1814–1819 with Jotham Post, Jr. 1814-15, and Peter H. Wendover 1815–19 | Succeeded by Henry Meigs, Peter H. Wendover |
