= Peter H. Wendover =

American politician

Peter Hercules Wendover (August 1, 1768 – September 24, 1834) was an early-19th-century American politician who was as a United States representative from New York for three terms, from 1815 to 1821.

== Biography ==
Born in New York City, Wendover received a liberal schooling and held several local offices. He was a member of the volunteer fire department of New York City in 1796. He served as delegate to the State constitutional conventions in 1801 and 1821 and was a member of the New York State Assembly in 1804.

=== Congress ===
Wendover was elected as a Democratic-Republican to the Fourteenth, Fifteenth, and Sixteenth Congresses (March 4, 1815 – March 3, 1821).

=== Later career ===
Afterward, he served as the Sheriff of New York County, New York, from 1822 to 1825.

=== Death ===
He died in New York City on September 24, 1834, and was buried in the Dutch Reformed Church Cemetery.

U.S. House of Representatives
Preceded by Jotham Post, Jr., William Irving	Member of the U.S. House of Representatives from New York's 2nd congressional district 1815–1821 with William Irving 1815–19 and Henry Meigs 1819–21	Succeeded by Churchill C. Cambreleng, John J. Morgan
