= Gertrude Rhinelander Waldo House =

Commercial building in Manhattan, New York

- The house as seen from diagonally across 72nd Street and Madison Avenue (2026)
- Interactive map of the Gertrude Rhinelander Waldo House area

General information
- Type: Mansion
- Architectural style: French Renaissance
- Location: 867 Madison Avenue, New York, NY 10021, United States
- Coordinates: 40°46′17″N 73°57′55″W
- Current tenants: Ralph Lauren Corporation
- Construction started: 1894
- Completed: 1898
- Cost: $1,000,000 (equivalent to $38,700,000 in 2025)
- Client: Gertrude Rhinelander Waldo
- Owner: 867 Madison, LLC

Technical details
- Floor count: 4

Design and construction
- Architect: Kimball & Thompson
- Gertrude Rhinelander Waldo House
- U.S. National Register of Historic Places
- U.S. Historic district – Contributing property
- New York State Register of Historic Places
- New York City Landmark
- Part of: Upper East Side Historic District (ID84002803)
- MPS: September 7, 1984
- NRHP reference No.: 80002727
- NYSRHP No.: 06101.001788
- NYCL No.: 0927

Significant dates
- Added to NRHP: May 6, 1980
- Designated CP: September 7, 1984
- Designated NYSRHP: June 23, 1980
- Designated NYCL: July 13, 1976

The Gertrude Rhinelander Waldo House (also 867 Madison Avenue and the Rhinelander Mansion) is a French Renaissance Revival mansion at the southeastern corner of Madison Avenue and 72nd Street on the Upper East Side of Manhattan in New York City, New York, U.S. Built between 1894 and 1898, it was designed by Alexander Mackintosh of the architectural firm of Kimball & Thompson. Though the house was constructed for the heiress Gertrude Rhinelander Waldo, she never moved in. The mansion was converted to a commercial building in the 20th century, becoming the New York City flagship store of the Ralph Lauren accessory and clothing company in the 1980s. The mansion is a New York City designated landmark and on the National Register of Historic Places.

The Gertrude Rhinelander Waldo House is four and a half stories tall and has a limestone facade modeled on a French château. Although storefront windows have been installed on the ground story over the years, the upper stories retain decorative details such as ornamental carvings and round-arched windows. The red roof contains various stone and copper dormers as well. The original interiors of the building are very poorly documented, as it was abandoned upon completion; the second story had various communal rooms, while the third and fourth stories originally had bedrooms. The interior layout has been significantly altered over the years, and few of the original interior plans and decorations survive.

Waldo bought the site in 1882 but did not develop it for more than a decade. Waldo refused to move into the house for unknown reasons, and she also refused to maintain, rent out, or sell the building. The Dime Savings Bank of New York took ownership in 1912, and two developers attempted to build apartments on the site in the 1910s. The building was partially converted to commercial use in 1920, when the antique dealer Olivotti & Company moved into the lower stories. Through the early 1980s, the building was sold several more times and hosted various commercial and residential tenants. In 1984, the designer Ralph Lauren leased the building and had it renovated to serve as the flagship store of his company, which opened in 1986. Ralph Lauren has been the mansion's sole tenant since then, though the house was sold several more times after Ralph Lauren moved in. The building became a Ralph Lauren menswear store in 2010.

== Site ==
The Gertrude Rhinelander Waldo House is at 867 Madison Avenue, along the southeast corner of 72nd Street, on the Upper East Side of Manhattan in New York City, New York, U.S. The house has a frontage of 102 feet (31 m) on Madison Avenue to the west and 40 feet (12 m) on 72nd Street to the north. The land lot is slightly L-shaped, with an area of 4,491 square feet (417.2 m^{2}).

The apparel and accessories chain Polo Ralph Lauren, which has had its flagship store at the Rhinelander Mansion since 1986, also operates additional structures across Madison Avenue. These include 888 Madison Avenue, a 22,000-square-foot (2,000 m^{2}) store completed in 2010 as Ralph Lauren's secondary flagship; it is designed in a Beaux-Arts style with a limestone facade and marble interiors. The Rhinelander Mansion shares the block with St. James' Episcopal Church immediately to the south, 36 East 72nd Street to the east, and 740 Park Avenue to the southeast. Other nearby buildings include 720 Park Avenue and 730 Park Avenue on the block to the south; 907 Fifth Avenue and 9 East 71st Street to the west; and 7 East 72nd Street and 9 East 72nd Street to the northwest.

== Architecture ==
The Gertrude Rhinelander Waldo House is four and a half stories tall. Kimball & Thompson were credited with the design of the house. According to a photo caption published when the house was nearly complete, a local designer with the firm, Alexander Mackintosh, was responsible for most of the work. The mansion was designed in a Francois I style and was modeled on the châteaux of the Loire Valley in France. It is alternatively known as the Rhinelander Mansion.

=== Exterior ===
The mansion has a limestone facade. Among the decorative details are ornamental carvings and round-arched windows in the French Renaissance style, which are concentrated on the upper stories. The roof is red and contains a copper cresting, as well as various dormers and finials.

==== Madison Avenue ====
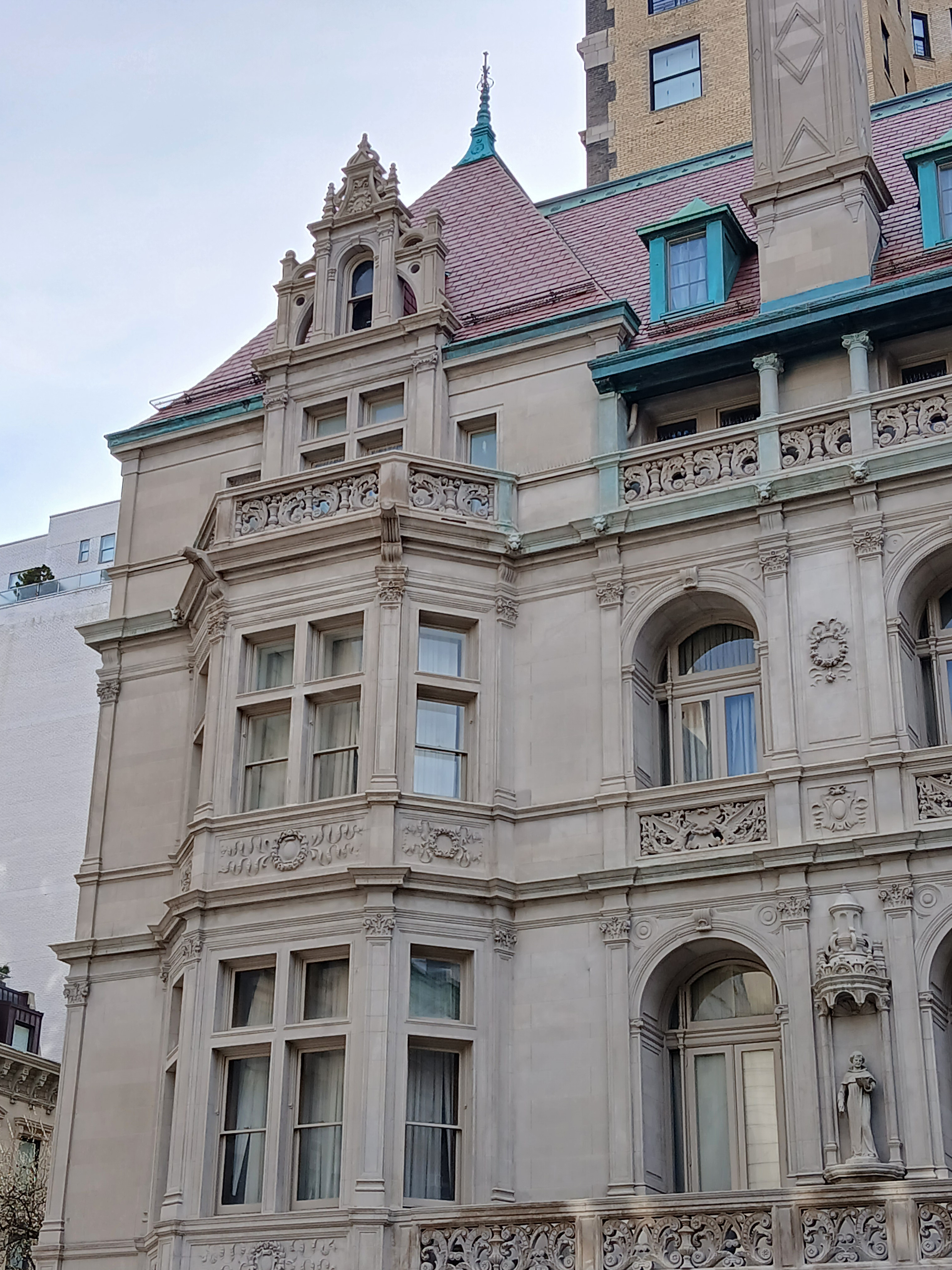
Northern bay on Madison Avenue

The primary elevation of the facade faces Madison Avenue and is divided vertically into three parts: a central section flanked by projecting pavilions at either end. In the center of the ground (first) floor was the original main entrance. The ground story originally had decorations and an iron fence, but these were removed in the 20th century, when the house became a commercial building. The round-arched doorways at ground level were originally windows, while the other ground-floor openings were enlarged into storefront windows. The ground floor contains storefront windows, round archways, and smooth walls. There is an entrance at the corner of Madison Avenue and 72nd Street, which was added in a 1980s renovation.

At the second and third stories, the center bays protrude from the facade. The center bays include such decorations as volutes, finials, colonnettes, and broken entablatures. On both stories, there are five recessed arched windows in the center bays, which are placed behind ornate openwork balustrades (similar to those at the Château of Blois). Each of the windows is topped by scrolled keystones, while the corners above the arches contain spandrels with round medallions. There are niches with small statues between each of the central second-story windows, while ornamented cartouches are placed between the third story windows. Many of the niches are empty, but some of the niches contain depictions of French Renaissance royalty. Within the projecting end pavilions, these stories contain rectangular windows divided by vertical transoms and horizontal mullions made of stone. There are pilasters on either side of each of the outer bays' windows; the pilasters are topped by capitals.

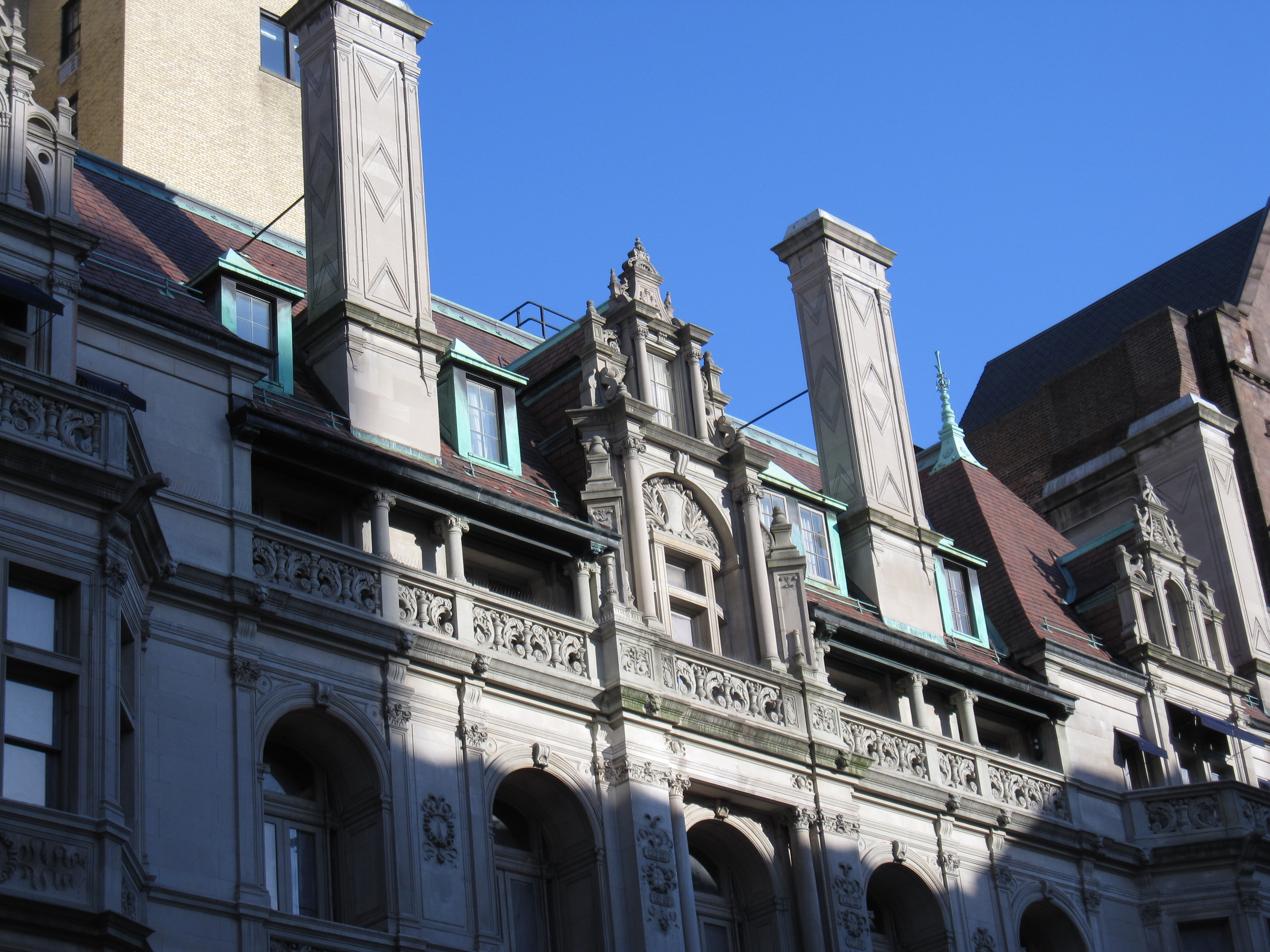
Detail of the building's upper stories

The fourth-story windows are rectangular, with colonnettes on either side of each window, and are placed behind openwork balustrades. The central bay is a double-height stone dormer. At the fourth story, the central dormer's window is flanked by columns and topped by a stone lunette. At the fifth story, there is a smaller window within the central dormer; there are finials above and beside it. On the extreme north and south ends of the Madison Avenue elevation, there is a smaller stone dormer in front of a section of hip roof. There are two pairs of copper dormer windows on the fifth story between the stone dormers. Each pair of copper dormers is separated by a stone chimney with carvings of rhombuses on its side, which are designed to resemble those on the Château de Chambord.

==== 72nd Street ====
On the 72nd Street elevation, the first floor has storefronts (similar to those on Madison Avenue), and the entire width of the facade is curved at the second and third floors. On both stories, the second and third stories are composed of rectangular windows, which are divided by vertical transoms and horizontal mullions made of stone. The center window on each story is a triple window, which in turn is flanked by one double window on either side. There are friezes with cartouches below the second-story windows, as well as putti and foliate panels below the third-story windows. The fourth and fifth stories have a double-height dormer, similar to the one at the center of the Madison Avenue elevation.

=== Interior ===
The original interiors of the building are very poorly documented, as it was abandoned upon completion in 1898, and some rooms may not even have been completed. The interior was reportedly lavishly decorated with carvings and rare tapestries. A New York Times reporter wrote in 1984 that 32 commercial tenants had occupied the house over the years, so many of the original decorations had been removed. According to another report, the mansion was significantly modified 15 times between 1921 and 1979. The architect Witold Rybczynski wrote in his book Home: A Short History of an Idea that, when the house was renovated in the 1980s, the designer Ralph Lauren aimed to redesign the interior in a way reminiscent of the past, rather than replicating the original architecture verbatim.

==== Basement and first story ====
There was a large bowling alley in the basement. The first floor was a large center hall extending one-third the width of the Madison Avenue frontage, with mahogany paneling on the walls and ceiling. There was a library to the right of the stairs, as well as a red-mahogany billiards room to the left. The original drawing room was decorated with a wooden floor, while the conservatory had mosaic flooring; both spaces had ornate ceilings.

On the eastern wall of the main hall, there was originally a grand staircase with a mosaic wall. Little is known about that staircase, but it was entirely demolished in a later renovation. A new staircase and elevator were built in the 1960s, and a grand mahogany staircase was added to the house in the 1980s, when the house was renovated for the Ralph Lauren Corporation. The design of the modern grand stairway is based on a stair at the Connaught Hotel in London; documents indicate that a historian known as Mosette recommended that the renovation architects build a replica of the hotel's stairway. Oil portraits were placed along the walls of the grand mahogany stairway.

==== Upper floors ====
The second story is the only part of the house for which detailed floor plans have been found. The second floor contained the main dining room, breakfast room, reception room, drawing room, two salon rooms, three kitchens, and six bathrooms. The parlor along 72nd Street had parquet floors, rosettes, and plaster moldings along the walls and ceilings. There were moldings along the arches, walls, and ceilings of the other rooms as well. In addition, there was a second-floor ballroom, which was lit by 1,000 light bulbs. There were bedrooms on the third floor and servants' quarters on the fourth floor. Much of the fourth floor was occupied by a large ballroom. The New York Times wrote in 1909 that, although a house of the Waldo Mansion's size should have had space for 10 to 12 servants, the house contained only two servants' bedrooms and no space at all for domestic workers.

By the early 1980s, the interior of the second story remained largely intact, but the third and fourth stories had been significantly modified with dropped ceilings and fluorescent lights. After the 1980s renovation, it had green walls with portraits, in addition to elaborate plasterwork, wood paneling, and vaulted ceilings. The rooms were variously designed in the style of a rural cottage or an English clubhouse. Display cases were carefully installed to blend in with the interiors, and items such as luggage, flowers, and birdcages were arranged to complement the house's design. The house also contained other features such as working mahogany fireplaces. The design was based on various settings such as a hotel, a workshop, and a clubhouse. Objects such as sepia prints, side tables, and Chippendale chairs were used to give the interiors the appearance of an English clubhouse. Other motifs, such as a fireplace with English-style paneling, were also used throughout the house.

== History ==
Gertrude Rhinelander Waldo was born in 1837 into the wealthy Rhinelander family, which had lived in downstate New York since 1696, when Philip Jacob Rhinelander emigrated from Germany to New Rochelle, New York. In 1876, she married the stockbroker Francis William Waldo, and they had one son, Rhinelander Waldo. After Francis died in 1878, his widow never remarried. In 1882, Waldo bought a site at the southeast corner of 72nd Street and Madison Avenue, announcing plans to construct a home that the Real Estate Record called "quite unique in design". She did not immediately proceed with construction and lived with her sister Laura in a row house on the opposite side of 72nd Street. By the mid-1890s, numerous wealthy families had settled on 72nd Street, and various chateauesque houses were being developed on the Upper East Side just east of Central Park.

=== Development and early history ===
==== Construction ====
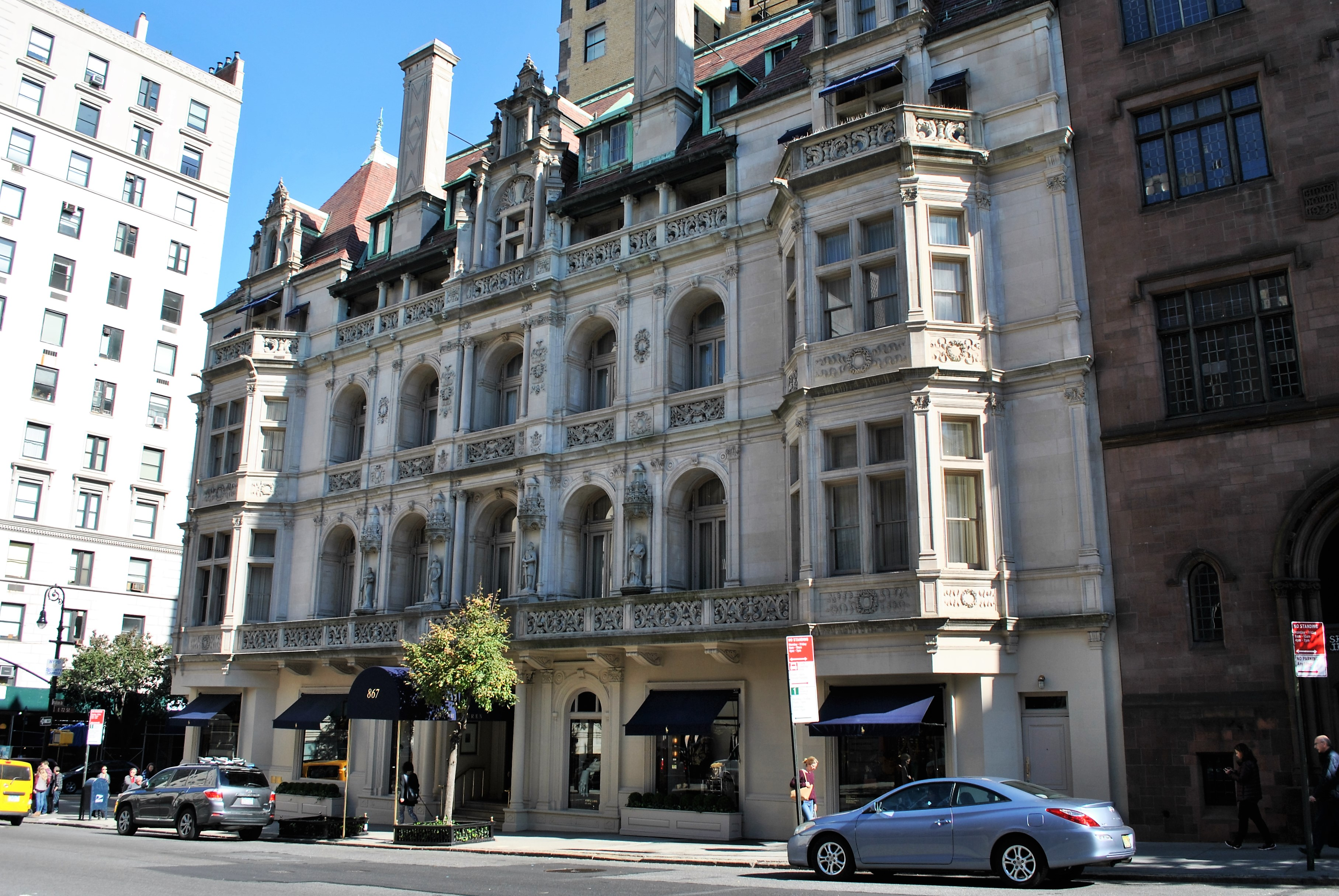
The house seen across Madison Avenue to the southwest

Waldo hired Francis Kimball and George Thompson to design a chateauesque house in New York City after being inspired by a chateau in France. In November 1894, the architectural firm of Kimball and Thompson filed plans for two houses near the southeast corner of 72nd Street and Madison Avenue. The five-story house at the corner itself was to cost $65,000, a relatively low price for its time, and there was to be a five-story house to the east, which was to cost $18,000. At the time, Waldo was living at the Savoy Hotel. She sold some of the property that she had inherited around 1896 and used the proceeds to cover a portion of the construction costs of two new adjoining homes on the property, which totaled $340,000, with the remaining balance in a $195,000 mortgage. The Doehring Fireproof Construction Company was hired to install fireproof partitions within the mansion. Waldo also traveled back to Europe to look for furniture that she wanted.

The four-story house at 867 Madison Avenue was finished by 1898. At the time of the house's completion, Waldo was in Europe. The New York Times estimated in 1909 that, in total, it had cost $1 million to build and furnish the house. A single directory denotes Gertrude Waldo as having resided in the house, but nearly all other sources describe Gertrude as never having lived there; news articles from the 1900s describe her as living at 31 East 72nd Street with her sister. The reason Waldo chose not to reside in the house is unknown, as she never divulged the reason before her death in 1914. One newspaper claimed that, when Gertrude returned from Europe, there was dissatisfaction with the building's style. (Note: The Austin Statesman wrote that Waldo's "husband" had objected to the design of the house. According to Christopher Gray of The New York Times, her husband died 20 years before the house was even finished.) Other newspapers claimed that the house was built for her son Rhinelander, who either refused to live there or went to the Philippines as soon as it was complete. According to research conducted by a later tenant, Waldo probably could not afford to live in the house upon her return.

==== Abandonment ====
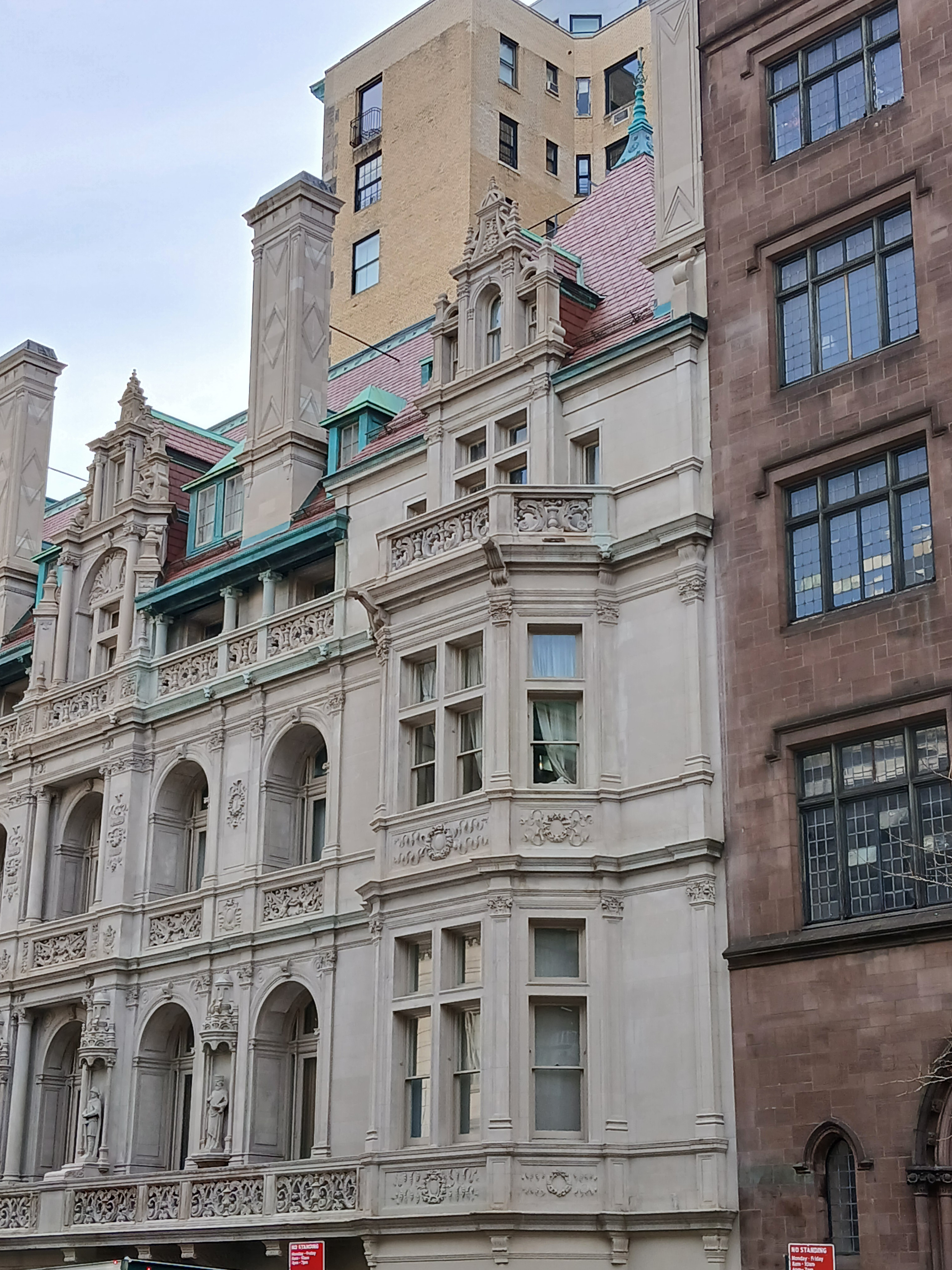
The southern portion of the facade on Madison Avenue

Waldo never unpacked many of the European furnishings she had brought from Europe, and the furnishings remained in their crates. Although Waldo did not live in the house, neither did she want to sell it. Several times, when her family found a buyer for the house, Waldo refused to sign the documents that were necessary for such a sale. Waldo also refused to rent it out or perform any maintenance, and she frequently did not pay interest on the house's mortgage. It is unknown why Waldo refused to make payments toward the mortgage, but whenever a bank came close to foreclosing on the house, she paid off the outstanding debt before she could lose control. The abandoned house stood in contrast to the apartment buildings Waldo did own, where she collected rent from tenants. One of the house's subcontractors placed a $2,675 lien on the house in 1901, claiming that Waldo had failed to pay them, although whether she paid them is unclear.

During the 1900s, thieves broke into the abandoned house on a regular basis, and the house gained the nickname "House of Mystery". The roof was already damaged by 1904, and one source reported that some of the paintings and gold-leaf decorations had been damaged beyond repair. Bronze decorations and mosaics had become covered with mold, and about $15,000 worth of books had been destroyed by water damage. When the house was placed on sale in 1905, one real-estate broker declared that the house needed at least $40,000 in repairs before he would consider buying it. Records show that Waldo gave a $50,000 mortgage on the house to Anna Baier that year. Baier moved to foreclose on the house in 1907. Thieves frequently targeted the abandoned mansion; in one case, there were four separate break-ins in four months.

By 1908, Waldo had placed the mansion at 867 Madison Avenue for sale, along with the adjacent house at 28 East 72nd Street to the east. By then, 867 Madison Avenue's windows and doors were dirty, and the mortar was peeling off the facade because of a lack of maintenance. Waldo reached an agreement to sell the house through a broker, but reneged on the deal when the papers effecting the transfer were ready to be signed. She said "I don't think I'll sell" and walked out on the offer. Baier foreclosed on the houses again in December 1909 to satisfy a $10,000 judgment, $9,221 in unpaid taxes, and a $150,000 mortgage, and the houses was scheduled to be sold at auction. The auction was canceled the next month. The buildings remained unoccupied, generating no revenue for Waldo, though 28 East 72nd Street would eventually be sold in 1911. That September, Waldo transferred ownership of the 867 Madison Avenue home to her sister Laura, along with other property that Waldo owned in Lower Manhattan on Washington Street and Barclay Street.

==== Sales ====
The Dime Savings Bank of New York moved to foreclose on the house's mortgage in October 1911. The Dime Savings Bank acquired the house at a foreclosure auction in February 1912, paying $150,000. At the time, local media sources reported that Waldo could have sold it for $350,000 in previous years. A restrictive covenant had been applied to the site, preventing it from being used as anything other than a private residence of up to four stories. The bank filed a lawsuit against all the other residents of the block in 1914, saying the existence of the restriction dissuaded potential buyers of the site. The Dime Savings Bank asked the New York Supreme Court to grant it an exception to the restriction, but neighboring property owners opposed the move, prompting the bank to file a lawsuit. By then, other parts of Madison Avenue were quickly being redeveloped with commercial structures. The bank argued that an apartment building was a series of private houses atop each other, but it was initially unsuccessful in lifting the restrictive covenant. The restriction was ultimately repealed by the late 1910s.

The Samuel A. Herzog Construction Company bought the house in March 1918, with plans to build an apartment structure there. After the Herzog company gave up its mortgage on the house, the Dime Savings Bank took back ownership. The Fred T. Ley Company indicated in January 1919 that it wished to buy the house with a loan from the Dime Savings Bank, and it bought the building in March. The Ley Company announced plans that June for a 14-story apartment building there, topped by a three-story penthouse, which would cost $1 million. Had the apartment building been erected, it would have contained 60 regular apartments with two to four rooms each. The planned penthouse, set back from the roof on both sides, was described as a "country house" with a limestone exterior, red Spanish-tile roof, 28 rooms, and a private elevator. By then, the home's stonework was falling off, while its windows had cracked.

=== Commercial and residential use ===
==== 1920s to 1940s ====
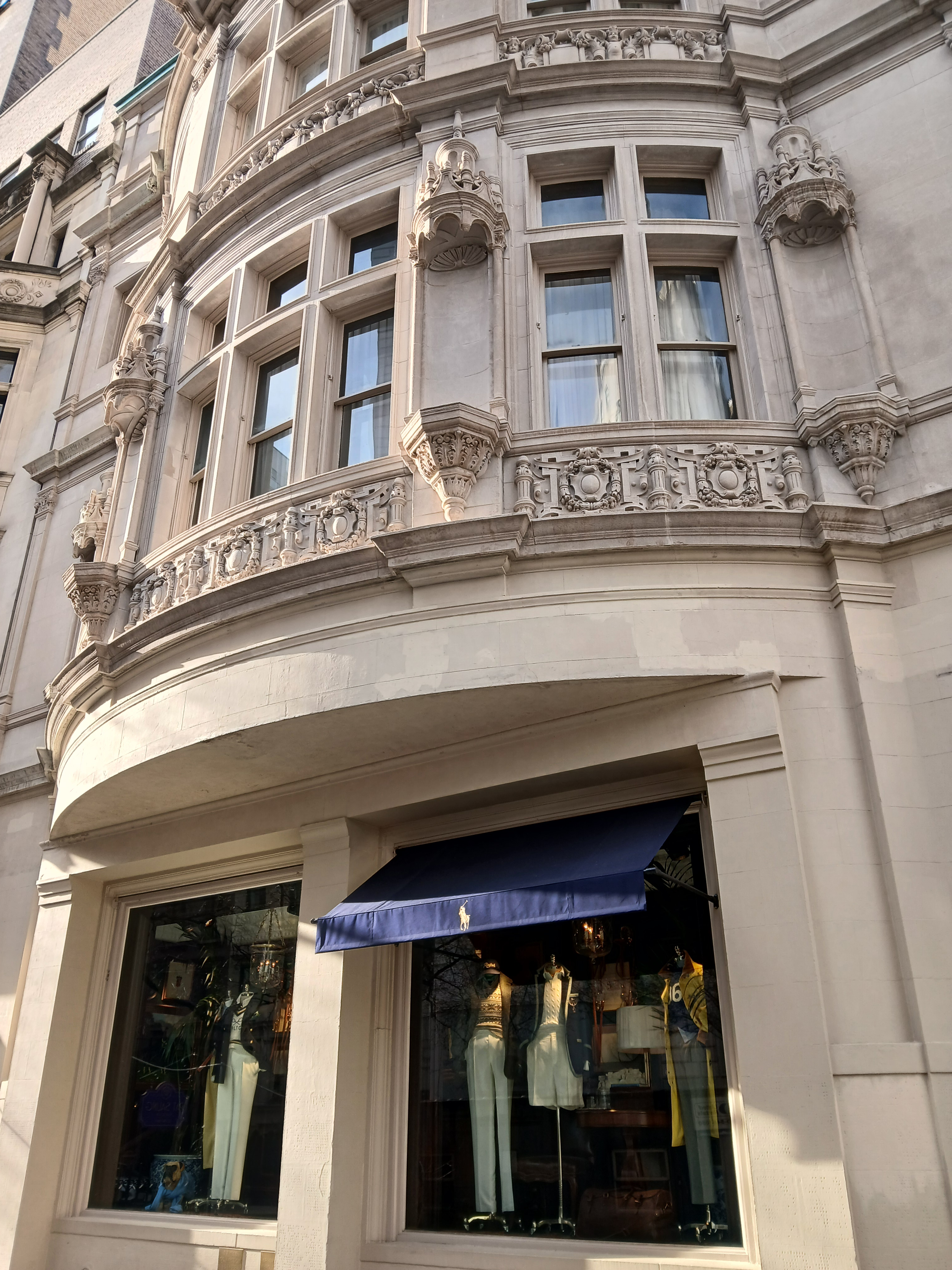
The northern elevation of the ground floor. In 1927, Olivotti's name was carved into the facade here.

The news media announced in October 1920 that the building had been sold to the Renaissance Building Company, which planned to divide it into apartments with two to four rooms each. The buyer also took over a $200,000 mortgage on the house. The lower stories were converted to commercial space and leased to the antique dealer Olivotti & Company, which was being forced to relocate from Madison Avenue and 45th Street. Olivotti originally leased the basement, first, and second stories, becoming the house's very first occupant. The New York Times characterized Olivotti's lease as being part of a new "art colony" on Madison Avenue; at the time, it was one of several art dealers or antique shops on the avenue within the Upper East Side. Norman S. Riesenfeld bought the building from Renaissance Inc. in June 1926. Riesenfeld initially considered replacing it with an apartment building, but he decided to resell the building that October to Olivotti & Co. after negotiating with the company's representatives during a trip to Italy. The Times reported that Olivotti planned to renovate and occupy the structure. Olivotti's name was carved into the northern elevation of the ground floor exterior. In addition, the mansion's original doorway was relocated.

While Olivotti occupied the lower stories, the upper floors were used as apartments. William May Wright and his wife were recorded as living in the house during the 1920s, hosting events such as receptions in their residence. The fourth and fifth stories were the residence of Alessandro Olivotti, the dealer who operated Olivotti & Company. One of the residences was leased to Mrs. B. Madden in 1932, and a pharmacy took over the basement and the corner storefront at 867 Madison Avenue in 1935. Mademoiselle Marie's dress shop leased a storefront in the mansion in 1941. The photographer Hal Phyfe, and a doctor known as Dr. Stanton, were also cited as having lived in the house in the mid-20th century, and the mansion was additionally occupied by two florists during that period.

During the mid-1940s, the house itself was valued at $25,000, while the land was valued at around $270,000. The Olivotti store went out of business in 1946, and the Dry Dock Savings Bank sold the house that September to A. J. Paretta, who planned to renovate the building into a commercial structure. By December 1946, the building was owned by Flushing Acres, who took over a $100,000 mortgage on the property. The fashion designer Elizabeth Hawes opened a store within the building in early 1948. The photographer Edgar de Evia also moved to one of the house's apartments with his partner Robert Denning, an interior decorator, in the 1940s or 1950s. De Evia's tenure in the mansion is particularly well-documented compared with those of other residents. In addition, a firm named Creative Playthings had space in the building.

==== 1950s to early 1980s ====
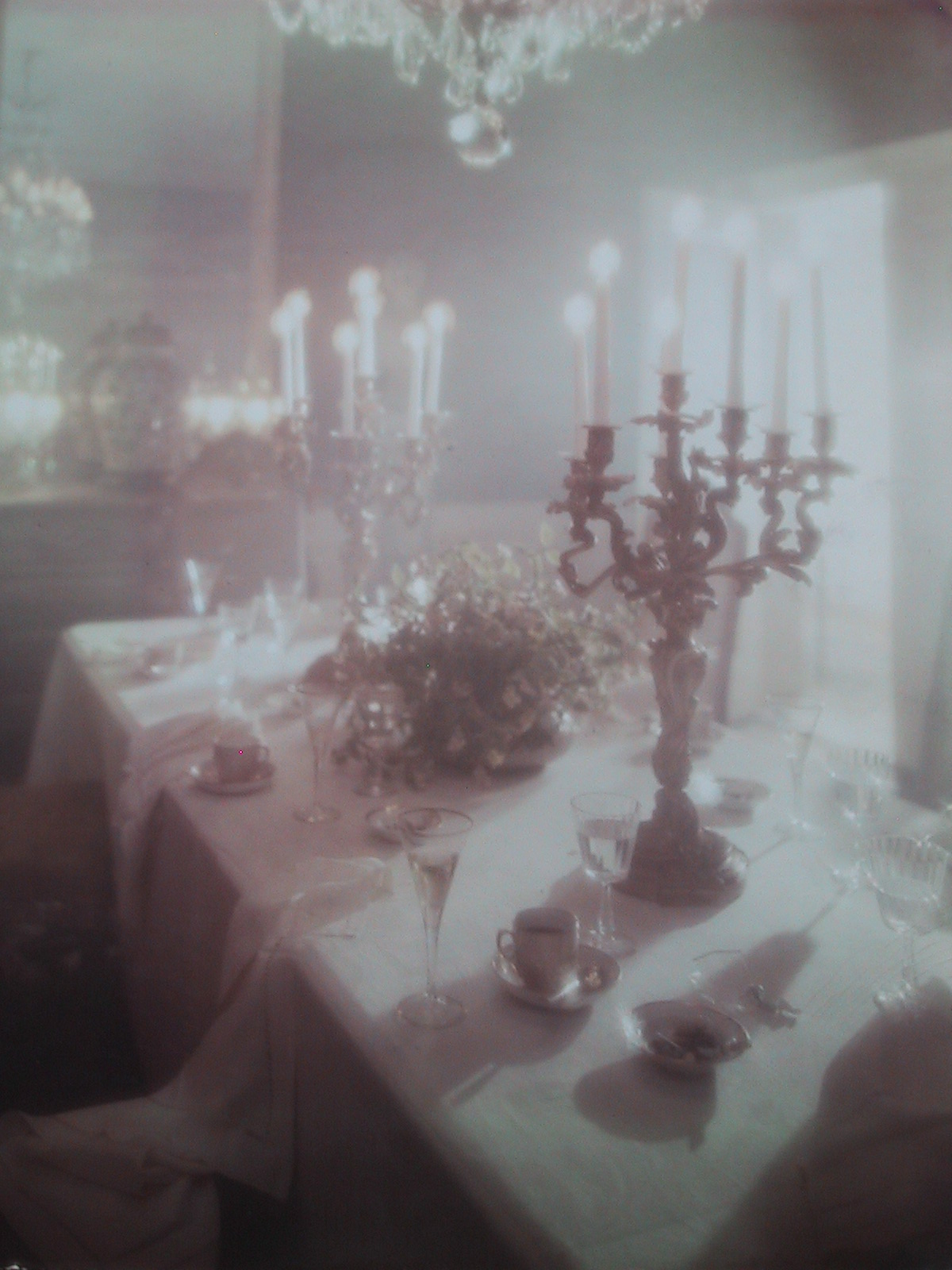
Dining room in the de Evia home in the Rhinelander Mansion in the 1950s

The interior decorator Elizabeth Draper leased a section of the second story in 1950. The real-estate company Fischer-Landis Inc. took over the mansion in February 1952 at an assessed value of $325,000; by that time, the house was known as the Olivotti Building. Its tenants included de Evia (who lived on three stories), as well as the Tate & Hall and Elizabeth Draper decorating firms, who paid a combined $47,000 a year. The next month, Fischer-Landis resold the Rhinelander Mansion to the 867 Madison Corporation. In 1956, the 867 Madison Corporation leased the building to de Evia's firm, the Denvia Realty Corporation, and Clara Dresses leased one of the house's storefronts. After meeting Vincent Fourcade in 1959, Denning separated from de Evia but continued to live at the house. Denning and Fourcade founded the firm of Denning & Fourcade, Inc., and opened an office within the building.

The spaces on the first floor were divided and leased to various tenants in the 1960s and 1970s. The restaurateur Larry Ellman, owner of the Cattleman Restaurant, leased some space in the building in the 1960s, and the Roko Gallery also had space at 867 Madison Avenue. The building was sold by the 867 Madison Avenue Corporation to Central Ison Ltd. in 1964 for $590,000. The new owner planned to preserve the building, as it was more economically feasible to do so; all of the existing tenants' leases were scheduled to expire by 1966, and Central Ison planned to lease some of the newly vacated space out to an auction house. By then, the New York City Landmarks Preservation Commission (LPC) was considering designating the house as a landmark, though an LPC representative said in 1971 that the commission had not formally considered a landmark designation for the house. The British auctioneer Christie's announced in 1967 that it had leased space on the Rhinelander Mansion's first and second floors and that it would restore the interiors. The top three stories became offices. Christie's opened its space to the public in November 1968.

The furrier David Bennett opened a store in the mansion in 1970. The nearby St. James Episcopal Church bought the house in 1971 (Note: Liu 2022, p. 86, cites a different date of 1972.) and used the top three floors as its offices. The church paid $300,000 in cash and took over a $700,000 mortgage. After buying the house, St. James Church hired the architectural firm of Adams & Woodbridge to devise plans for a connection between the mansion and the church's adjacent parish house. During the 1970s, Christie's continued to occupy the Rhinelander Mansion, and a clothing store operated by the fashion designer Julio Espada also opened there. An entrance for a flower shop was added during the decade. The LPC considered designating the Rhinelander Waldo House as a city landmark in May 1976 and formally designated the building that July. At the time, the first floor had several shops, the second floor hosted Christie's, and the third through fifth floors housed the St. James Church, The auctioneer Phillips, Son & Neale moved into the Rhinelander Mansion in 1977, using it as its headquarters. The house was also renovated to accommodate Phillips, Son & Neale.

The building was added to the National Register of Historic Places (NRHP) in 1980. Phillips, Son & Neale acquired the mansion from St. James Episcopal Church the same year. When Philips, Son & Neale placed the mansion for sale in 1982, the Rhinelander Florist shop occupied the ground floor. Around the same time, the Zabar family leased one of the storefronts for their gourmet-food store Eat, redecorating the space in a variation of the house's original interior. The Zabars restored the space's windows, mahogany ceilings, and wooden doors, and they also added a marble floor, entrance arch, and balustrade. The house also hosted historic-house tours in the 1980s. Philips, Son & Neale continued to own the house until 1984, when the 867 Partnership reportedly bought it for $6.36 million. At the time of the sale, Eat and a kitchen appliance store named La Cuisiniere occupied the first floor. 867 Partnership unsuccessfully sought to lease the second through fifth floors to a bank. Throughout the years, the interiors had been significantly modified, and many of the original decorative details were no longer visible.

=== Ralph Lauren use ===
==== Renovation ====
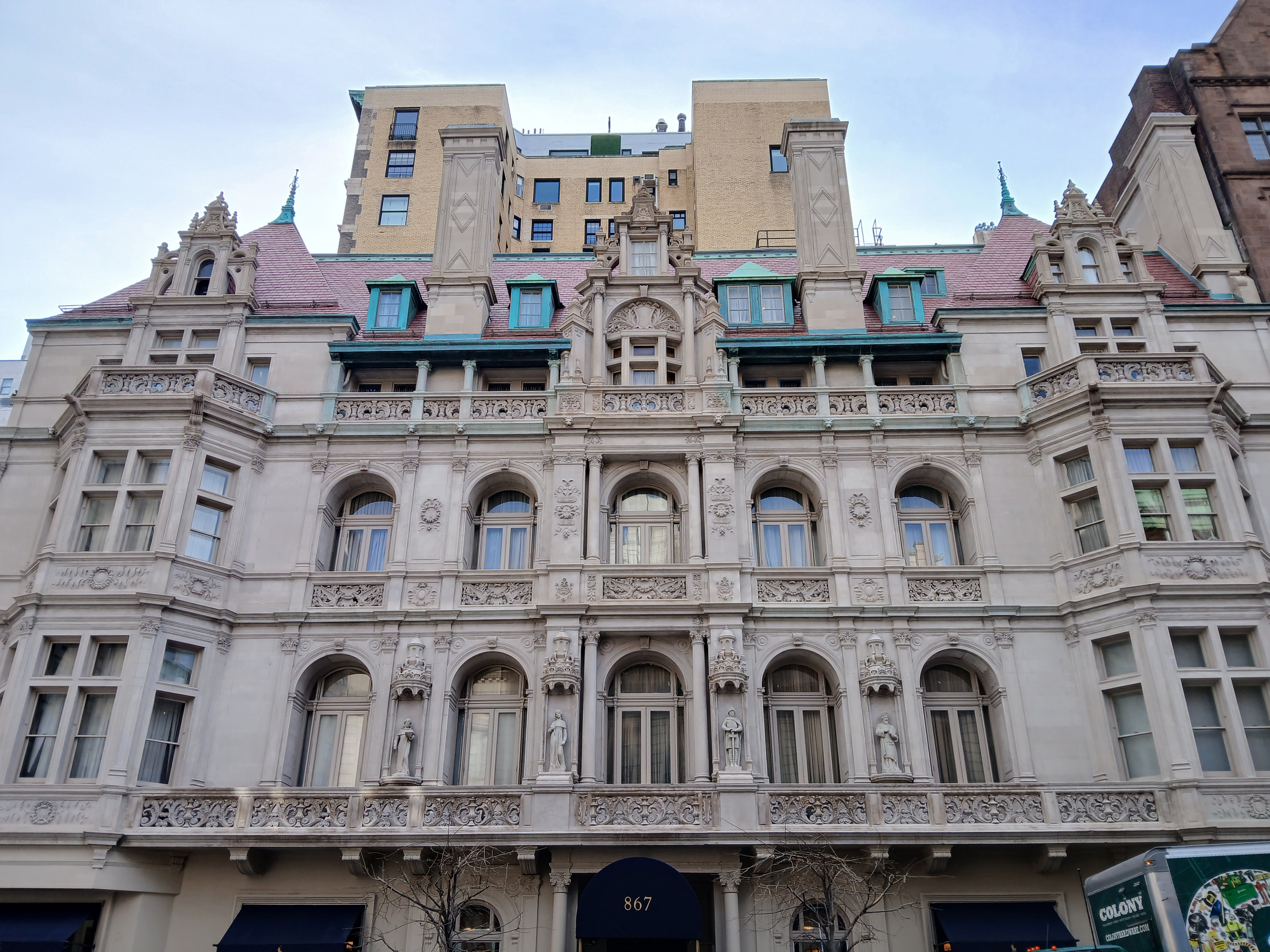
The second to fourth floors of the Madison Avenue facade

867 Partnership began renovating the building in 1984, converting the second floor to retail space and the third through fifth floors into office space. The facade was also restored. The fashion designer Ralph Lauren, head of the Polo Ralph Lauren Corporation, leased the basement and the first four stories in January 1985, with an initial lease of 20 years and an option to extend it another 29 years. (Note: Liu 2022, p. 86, says Ralph Lauren took over the building in 1983 and began renovating it in 1984.) Lauren had considered leasing the Charles Scribner's Sons Building and a Trump Tower storefront on Fifth Avenue before deciding upon the Rhinelander Mansion. He submitted plans that March to expand the mansion's rear and to renovate the exterior. Lauren planned to convert the house into New York City's first standalone Polo Ralph Lauren clothing store (at the time, all of his New York City sales were through other stores). One company executive said they wanted to "restore the charm and dignity the building had to create an interior that's elegant and clubby", and Lauren himself told Architectural Digest that "I've always thought that showing clothes in a townhouse would be the ultimate for me". Rhinelander Florist, Eat, and La Cuisiniere all had to relocate to accommodate the Polo Ralph Lauren store.

Naomi Leff & Associates were hired to design the house's renovation; this was a contrast to other Ralph Lauren stores, which had been designed by Ken Winslow. Polo Fashions executive Buffy Birrittella assisted Lauren with the renovation. The Rhinelander Mansion's renovation required as many as 400 workers at a time. As part of the project, workers installed furniture and decorations that were reminiscent of the house's original design, including oak floors and mahogany balustrades. Although many of the original architectural drawings and decorative details were no longer extant, Leff's firm restored some of the original decorations, such as stairways and plasterwork. The main entrance was moved to the corner of the building. Ralph Lauren employees traveled to Europe to acquire antique decorations and furniture for the interiors. The renovation team also acquired materials such as 82,000 square feet (7,600 m^{2}) of mahogany, in addition to felt walls and drapery. The interiors were fitted with such lavish displays as antique toys, rattan cages with live canaries, and real grass. One commentator called the mansion's store "the first flagship store to actively engage with filmic fantasy as a whole of brand merchandising strategy".

Though the store was originally supposed to open in November 1985, it was delayed by factors ranging from constant bomb threats to stringent preservation requirements. The 20,000-square-foot (1,900 m^{2}) store opened on April 21, 1986, following a preview event. According to Lauren, the project cost over $14 million, though other sources described the renovation as costing up to $18 million or $30 million. Leff's firm also gained media attention when the renovation was completed. Following the renovation, Polo Ralph Lauren requested a $4 million federal tax credit for the building's restoration, as the structure was on the NRHP. The New York State Office of Parks, Recreation and Historic Preservation (OPRHP), which had to endorse the tax credit, spent over a year reviewing Lauren's request, as many of the original decorative details had been covered up or even destroyed.

==== 1980s and 1990s ====
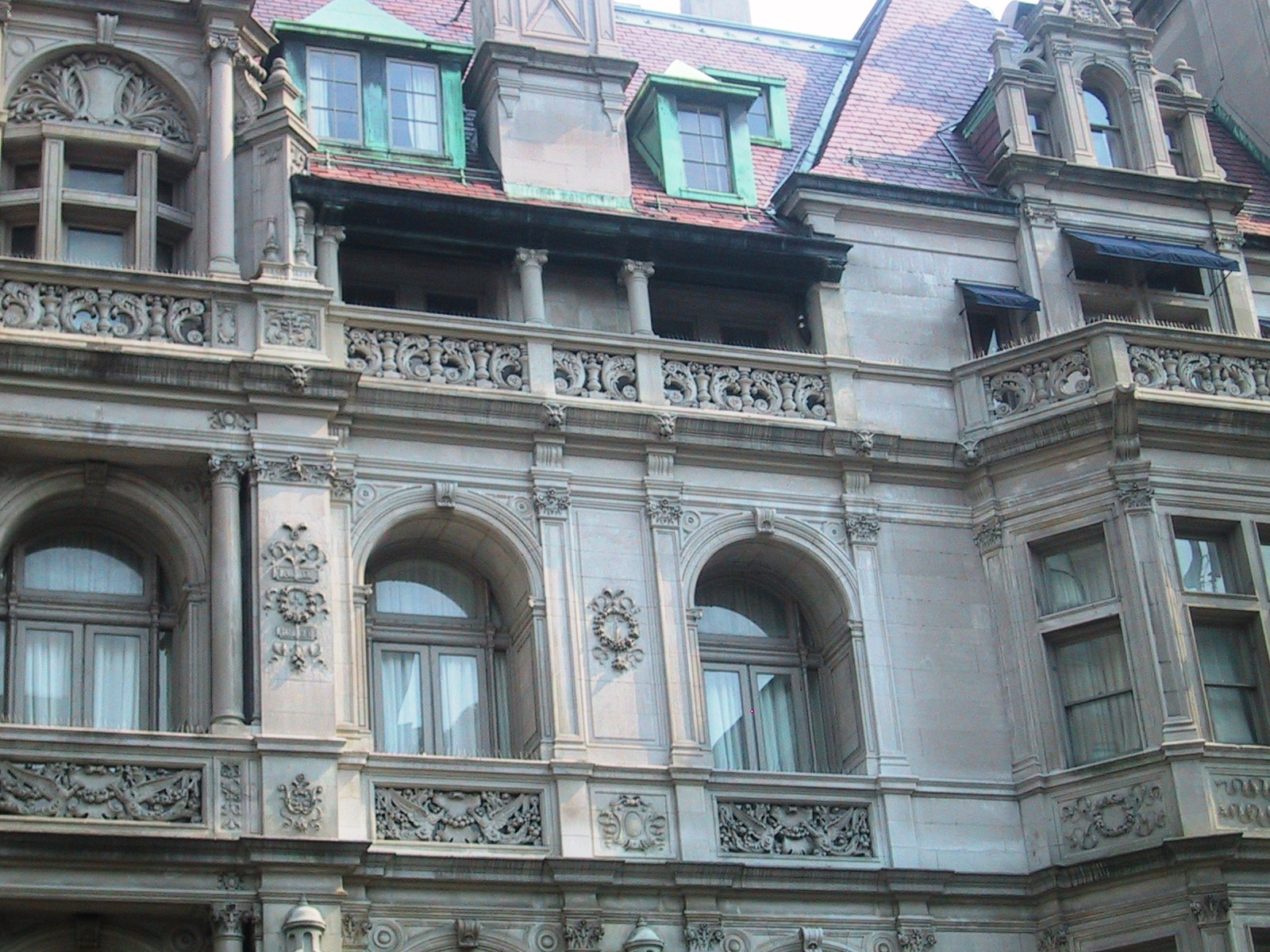
Detail of the exterior on Madison Avenue

Polo Ralph Lauren was the sole operator of the 867 Madison Avenue store, in contrast to other Ralph Lauren stores that had co-owners. Lauren intended to sell new clothing designs at the Rhinelander Mansion before selling them elsewhere. Originally, the first two stories were for men's clothing and accessories; the third floor was for women's clothing; and the fourth story was for home furnishings. The arrangement was deliberate: the store was marketed as primarily a menswear store, and Birrittella said that, while women would walk through men's clothing departments, the inverse was not true. After the Rhinelander Mansion store opened, Lauren said: "I saw families go upstairs and shop, and that's an experience." The Rhinelander Mansion store earned between $80,000 and $120,000 daily in its first month; within a year, the store had made $31 million. During Christmas holiday seasons, Polo Ralph Lauren replaced the house's awnings and redecorated its interior. The company spent more than $100,000 in 1988 to refurbish a room on the third floor for the women's collection, and it opened a "country store" on the fourth floor the same year.

The house was placed for sale at the beginning of 1989, and several foreign firms expressed interest in buying the mansion. An Irish company, Power Corporation plc, bought the house in mid-1989 for $43 million; Power Corporation's executive vice president called the building a "trophy property" because of factors such as the Ralph Lauren store's sales revenue and the consumer price index. At the time, Polo Ralph Lauren's rent was eight percent of the Rhinelander Mansion store's sales revenue. The Rhinelander Mansion flagship was one of Polo Ralph Lauren's most profitable stores in the early 1990s, and the store had outgrown the mansion. In 1991, the company leased space at 888 Madison Avenue, across the street from the mansion, for its sportswear division. The company decided to renovate 888 Madison Avenue, opening a Polo Sport store there in September 1993. Unlike the Rhinelander Mansion, the Polo Sport store was designed in a contemporary style. The opening of the Polo Sport store at 888 Madison Avenue further increased sales at the flagship store in 867 Madison Avenue.

Despite the flagship's popularity among tourists, as well as the location's high revenues (which reached $33.8 million in 1993), it operated at a net loss in the mid-1990s due to high expenses. The mansion's owner Power Corporation was also experiencing financial difficulties and discreetly placed the house for sale in 1992. The firm sought to resell the house for $46 million, but there were few potential buyers. By early 1997, Power Corporation was still negotiating to sell the house to one of several potential buyers, including Polo Ralph Lauren. The mansion was sold in November 1997 to an unidentified German entity for around $36 million. At the time, Polo Ralph Lauren was the sole tenant of the mansion, paying $3 million annually in rent. 867 Madison Avenue retained its country-club atmosphere through the end of the 20th century. A 1998 Los Angeles Times article noted that the flagship store's patrons were given complimentary drinks.

==== 2000s to present ====
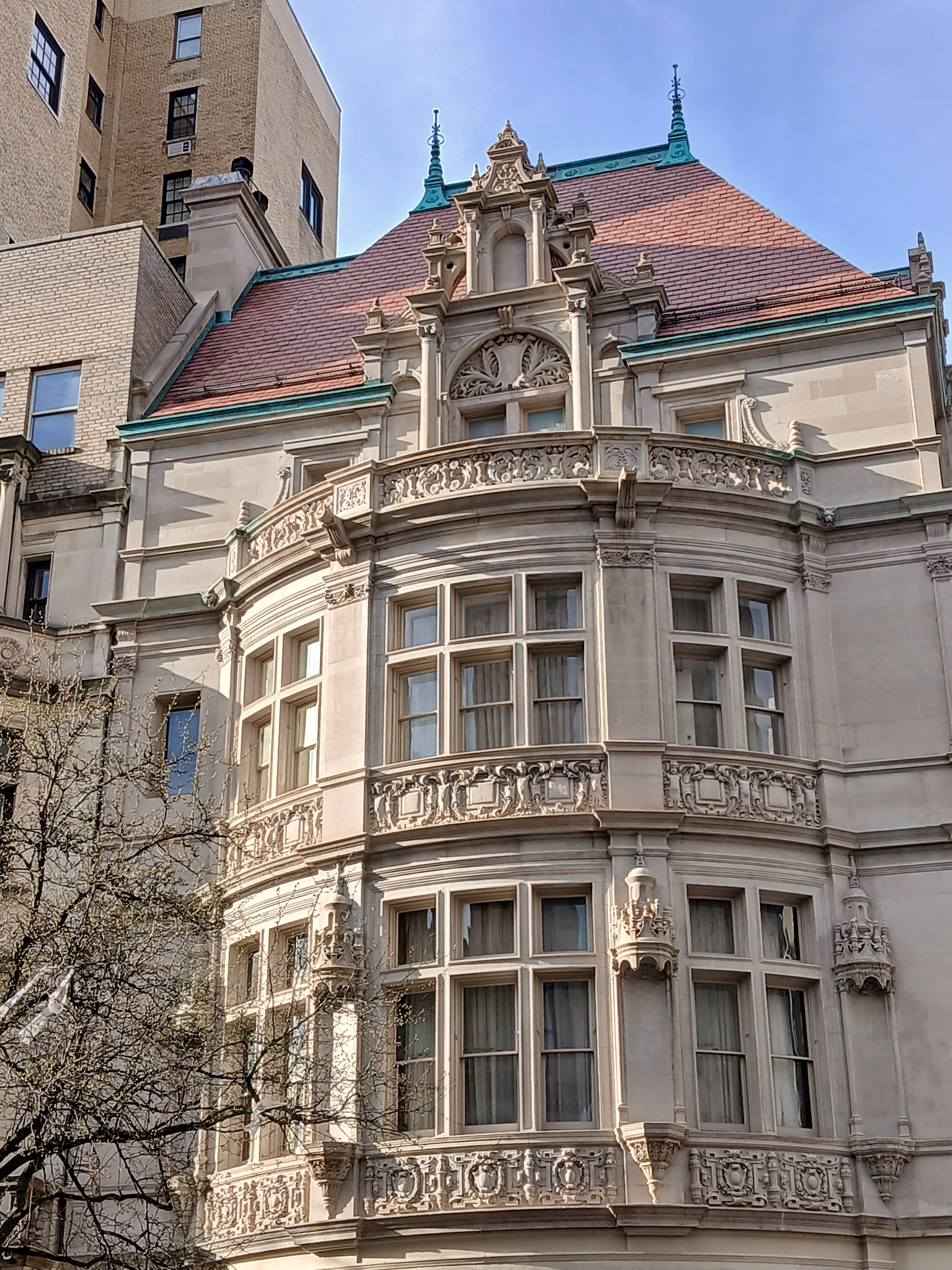
The house as seen from across 72nd Street

In the early 2000s, a Women's Wear Daily reporter wrote that the Rhinelander Mansion maintained its manor-like character, while the store inside had 50 salespeople "who behave more like servants at an English estate than typical retail clerks". Polo Ralph Lauren kept the mansion's drapes closed to entice visitors, while the decorations and artwork inside were swapped out every few weeks to attract repeat customers. By then, men's and women's clothing departments each occupied about half of the house's space. Polo Ralph Lauren acquired yet another building across the street, at 872 Madison Avenue, in 2004; that structure housed the store's baby-clothing department, which had opened the previous year. The boys' clothing department moved to another structure nearby, at 878 Madison Avenue, in 2004. A writer for The New York Times said in 2006 that the block of Madison Avenue adjoining the Rhinelander Mansion had become a "Disney-like mall of Ralph Lauren stores". Lauren also opened stores downtown to attract younger customers who did not travel to the Rhinelander Mansion.

The Rhinelander Mansion was sold again in 2005 for $80 million to Sloane Capital Group, an investment group led by the Irish investors Aidan Brooks and J. P. McManus. Although Polo Ralph Lauren had offered to buy the house, Sloane Capital had submitted a higher bid. The Rhinelander Mansion remained Polo Ralph Lauren's flagship through the late 2000s. Cheaper items were placed near the main entrance, while more pricey objects were deeper inside the mansion. Ralph Lauren opened an eyewear division within the mansion in 2006. Ralph Lauren announced plans in 2008 to rebuild the neighboring structure at 888 Madison Avenue into the company's second New York City flagship. The womenswear and home appliances departments were moved from the Rhinelander Mansion to the new flagship when the latter structure opened in 2010. The Rhinelander Mansion was converted into Ralph Lauren's flagship menswear store, while the company's eyewear and children's divisions were located elsewhere.

When the Rhinelander Mansion opened in September 2010, each story was occupied by different menswear brands. The first floor contained watches and Polo-branded items; the second floor had the Purple Label brand and a luggage department; the third floor accommodated a "world of heritage" department and the RRL brand; and the fourth floor was used by the Black label collection, the RLX activewear label, and a sportswear room. Ralph Lauren opened a shoe salon for men on the mansion's ground floor in 2013. At Lauren's request, the Polo division was relocated upstairs in the mid-2010s, resulting in decreased sales. The company instead displayed expensive accessories and objects in the storefront windows. In the 2010s, the Ralph Lauren Corporation also hosted shows outside its stores at Madison Avenue and 72nd Street.

Brooks and McManus continued to own the building through Tribeca Holdings, which agreed in 2016 to sell the building to an unnamed buyer at an undisclosed price. The store closed temporarily in 2020 due to the COVID-19 pandemic in New York City. In December 2023, Ralph Lauren renewed its lease for the building until 2034.

== Impact ==
=== Reception ===
When the building was constructed, numerous sources described the project as costly and extensive. In 1906, the New York Evening World called the mansion "one of the most pretentious in the city" before the Andrew Carnegie Mansion, Charles M. Schwab House, and other large dwellings were finished. The architect and writer Robert A. M. Stern wrote in his 1983 book New York 1900 that the house's design had been derived from the same sources as the Fifth Avenue mansions of the renowned architect Richard Morris Hunt, but that the Rhinelander Mansion "surpassed the master in exuberance and charm". The architecture critic Henry Hope Reed Jr. said: "The fortress heritage of the rural, royal residences of the Loire was not lost in the transfer to New York. The roof-line is very fine....The Gothic is found in the high-pitched roof of slate, the high, ornate dormers and the tall chimneys."

After the Ralph Lauren store opened in 1986, a Chicago Tribune writer likened the building to an English gentlemen's club, while Newsday said the decor evoked the original grandeur of the mansion. Los Angeles Times writers described the house as a "merchant's mansion straight from Lifestyles of the Rich and Famous" and compared it to a country estate. Paul Goldberger, who at the time was an architectural critic at The New York Times, said the renovation was "the most successful conversion of a New York house into a luxury emporium" after the renovation of the Morton F. Plant House for the jeweler Cartier in the early 20th century. Another New York Times writer in 2006 said the mansion's rooms were an "interior design fantasy", complementing the items that were being sold there.

A writer for The New York Times wrote in 1994 that "the four-story, faux French chateau is one of the city's best-known and beloved structures". The AIA Guide to New York City wrote, "Every part of this building exudes personality". In a 2001 guidebook, Francis Morrone wrote that the building's "varied, irregular silhouette" had a romantic air and that it was one of the main surviving Chateauesque mansions in the city. Christopher Gray wrote in 2010 that the house's design would have been suited for Fifth Avenue, where there were similarly large mansions. A writer for the Daily Beast wrote that the Madison Avenue mansion and the adjacent house on 72nd Street was "her crowning achievement, and her most lasting legacy".

==== Impact of Ralph Lauren store ====
Before the Polo Ralph Lauren store opened at the Rhinelander Mansion, few similar boutique flagship stores existed, and most of Madison Avenue's stores were private boutiques rather than large chains. Fashion-industry executives predicted that the store's opening would encourage retail activity on Madison Avenue, and department store officials feared that people would stop buying Ralph Lauren merchandise at their stores, though that prediction did not come to pass.

The success of the Rhinelander Mansion store caused rents at nearby buildings to increase and prompted Lauren to build other flagship locations. Polo Ralph Lauren became one of several upscale fashion outlets along Madison Avenue from 57th to 72nd Street; one observer credited its presence with having inspired the openings of other stores on the avenue. Despite a retail downturn in the late 1980s, Polo Ralph Lauren's Rhinelander Mansion store remained one of the most popular on Madison Avenue, and the house itself became a symbol of Polo Ralph Lauren.

=== Awards and design influence ===
Following the house's 1986 renovation, the Friends of the Upper East Side Historic District gave Lauren an award in 1986. The New York Landmarks Conservancy gave the house itself an award for "outstanding commercial renovation" in 1988. The design of the Rhinelander Mansion inspired that of another Polo Ralph Lauren store on Michigan Avenue in Chicago, although the Chicago store was 37,000 square feet (3,400 m^{2}), nearly twice the Rhinelander Mansion's size. The arrangement of other Polo Ralph Lauren locations in London, Paris, Moscow, Tokyo, and Milan were based on the layout of the Rhinelander Mansion store as well. 888 Madison Avenue, immediately to the west, was inspired by the designs of the Rhinelander Mansion and the nearby James B. Duke and Henry Clay Frick mansions.

== See also ==
- List of New York City Designated Landmarks in Manhattan from 59th to 110th Streets
- National Register of Historic Places listings in Manhattan from 59th to 110th Streets
