= The Dutchman's Fireside =

The Dutchman's Fireside is an 1831 novel that was popular in its day, by American author James Kirke Paulding.

First released in June 1831, it was published in both England and the United States, with new editions appearing until 1852, and translated into French, German, Swedish, Danish, and Dutch. Paulding's son William released a revised edition in 1868.
