= Harry E. Lewis =

American politician

Harry Emerson Lewis (March 16, 1880 – August 23, 1948), was a Jewish-American lawyer and judge from New York.

== Life ==
Lewis was born on March 16, 1880, in New York City, New York, the son of Leopold J. Lewis and Emma Lowenthal.

Lewis began working as a clerk for the Kings County District Attorney's office when he was 16. After graduating from the Boys High School in Brooklyn, he began to study law in the law office of Foster L. Backus. He was admitted to the bar in 1901, and continued working for Backus for the next five years, partly as a law partner. In 1906, he became a law partner with his brother Oscar A. Lewis in Brooklyn, working with him for the next nine years.

Lewis served as the legal advisor for the Republican Party in Brooklyn. In 1915, Governor Whitman appointed him County Judge of Kings County; he was previously elected to be a delegate to the 1915 New York Constitutional Convention, but he was replaced as a delegate upon his appointment as judge. He lost the election for the office later that year to Mitchell May. In April 1916, he was appointed Brooklyn District Attorney. He was elected to the office later that year and was re-elected in 1921. As district attorney, he disclosed police wire-tapping facilities were being used in an investigation for the Catholic Charities, which resulted in the indictment of the commissioner of charities and the attorney of the investigating body. In 1919, he investigated and indicted the people responsible for the Malbone Street wreck and convicted the bandits Chapman and Hanby.

In 1921, Lewis was elected as a Republican to the New York Supreme Court, Second District. He started serving as Justice in 1922. He served as a member of the Appellate Term of the Supreme Court in 1929. In 1931, Governor Franklin Roosevelt appointed him to preside in a special Supreme Court session for cases involving bank scandals in Manhattan and Brooklyn. In 1935, he was re-elected for a second term to the Supreme Court with a joint nomination from the two major political parties. He was elected a delegate-at-large to the 1938 New York Constitutional Convention, where he was chairman of the Bill of Rights Committee, proposed wire-tapping be made legal by court order (which was objected at the time), and instrumented a civil rights section to the State Constitution that guaranteed no one could be discriminated regardless of race or creed.

In 1943, Lewis was named to the Appellate Division, Second Department. In 1946, Governor Dewey appointed him Presiding Justice of the Court. As Justice, Lewis favored capital punishment, life imprisonment for habitual offenses, and a simplification of the laws. He was still serving as Presiding Justice when he died.

Lewis was a trustee of the Brooklyn Institute of Arts and Sciences, vice-president of the Jewish Hospital of Brooklyn, and a director of the Federation of Jewish Philanthropies. He was a member of the American Bar Association, the New York State Bar Association, the Brooklyn Bar Association, the Montauk Club, and the Inwood Country Club. In 1906, he married Rose Nathan. Their daughter, Mrs. Barnett J. Nova, was the daughter-in-law of New York Supreme Court Justice Algernon I. Nova.

Lewis died of a heart attack while vacationing in the Saranac Inn in Upper Saranac on August 23, 1948. After a funeral service in Congregation Beth Elohim, he was buried in Mount Carmel Cemetery.

Legal offices
| Preceded by James Church Cropsey | Brooklyn District Attorney; 1916–1921 | Succeeded by Herbert N. Warbasse |
