= Rhinelander Waldo =

New York City fire and police commissioner (1877–1927)

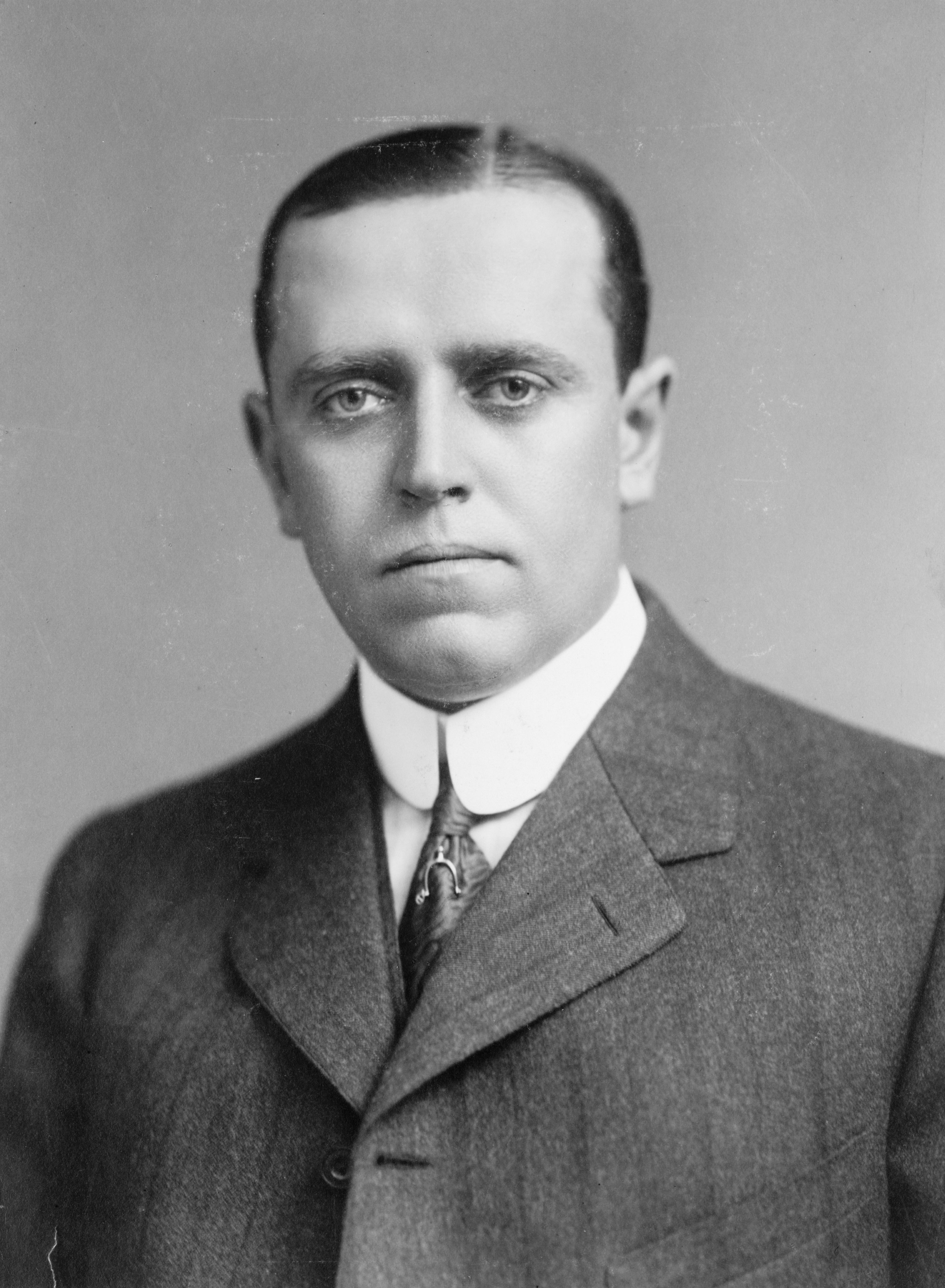
- Waldo c. 1908

8th New York City Police Commissioner
- In office May 23, 1911 – December 31, 1913
- Appointed by: William Jay Gaynor
- Preceded by: James C. Cropsey
- Succeeded by: Douglas I. McKay

7th New York City Fire Commissioner
- In office January 13, 1910 – May 23, 1911
- Appointed by: William Jay Gaynor
- Preceded by: Nicholas J. Hayes
- Succeeded by: Joseph Johnson

Personal details
- Born: May 24, 1877 New York City, New York, U.S.
- Died: August 13, 1927 (aged 50) Garrison, New York, U.S.
- Spouse: Virginia Otis Heckscher (m. 1910)
- Parent(s): Francis William Waldo; Gertrude Rhinelander Waldo
- Education: Columbia School of Mines; United States Military Academy

Rhinelander Waldo (May 24, 1877 – August 13, 1927) was appointed the seventh New York City Fire Commissioner by Mayor William Jay Gaynor on January 13, 1910. He resigned on May 23, 1911, less than two months after the deadly Triangle Shirtwaist Factory fire, to accept an appointment as the eighth New York City Police Commissioner. On December 31, 1913, he was dismissed by the outgoing acting mayor, Ardolph Kline. Among other achievements in office, Waldo contributed to the motorization of both departments.

== Early life ==
Rhinelander Waldo was born on May 24, 1877, in New York City to Francis William "Frank" Waldo, a stockbroker, and Gertrude Rhinelander Waldo, an American heiress. His father died the next year, in 1878. His mother later became known for commissioning the Rhinelander Mansion. Located in Manhattan at 867 Madison Avenue, it was designed in the 1890s by Kimball & Thompson and completed in 1898.

Waldo was educated at the Berkeley School and the Columbia School of Mines before attending the United States Military Academy at West Point. Columbia University's alumni notes show that he was a member of the class of 1899, but it is unclear whether or not he graduated with the class.

== Career ==
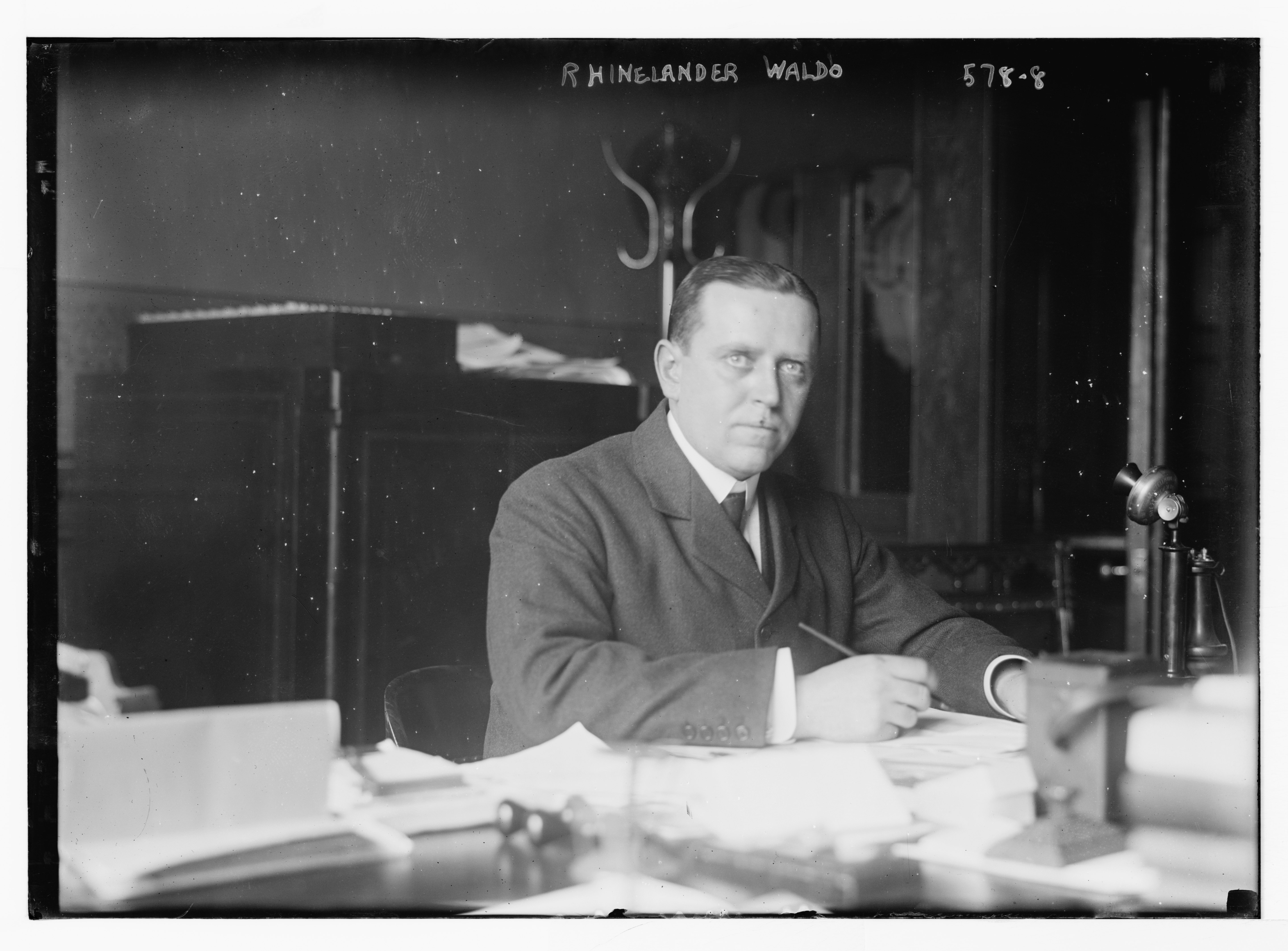
Waldo, c. 1915.

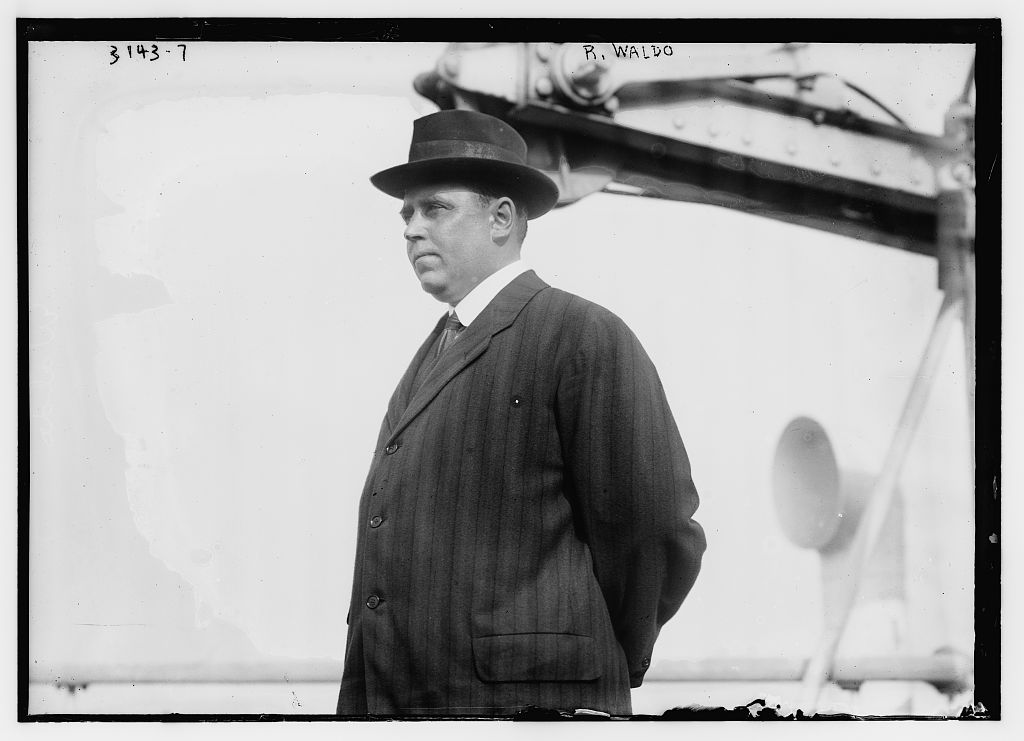
Waldo, c. 1915.

He joined the Seventeenth Infantry Regiment of the United States Army as a Second Lieutenant in 1899, after the United States had occupied the Philippine Islands in the Spanish–American War. In the course of nearly four years in the Philippines, he served under General Arthur MacArthur, Jr., was on the staff of General Leonard Wood during the Moro Rebellion, and commanded a battalion of Philippine Scouts. He resigned from the Army in 1905 with the rank of captain and became New York's First Deputy Commissioner of Police in January 1906, at the age of 28.

Waldo, who had served as New York City Fire Commissioner since the beginning of Mayor Gaynor's term in January 1910, was in office at the time of the Triangle Shirtwaist Factory fire which occurred on March 25, 1911, and killed 146 people.

On June 9, 1911, only 17 days after taking office as Police Commissioner, Waldo founded the motor-cycle squad, organized under the Office of Street Traffic Regulation Bureau. Another of his early acts as Police Commissioner was the appointment of three "Strong Arm" anti-vice squads and their commanders—one of whom, Charles Becker, was later executed for complicity in the July 1912 murder of the bookmaker Herman Rosenthal (shortly after Rosenthal had told the press of extortion by Becker and other police).

Acting Mayor Ardolph Kline's elected successor, John Purroy Mitchel, indicated before taking office at noon on January 1, 1914, that he would not keep Commissioner Waldo in office. Waldo tendered his resignation effective at midnight December 31, 1913, after transferring or accepting resignations from most of the department's senior officers and specialists. Amid much confusion and discord, Mayor Kline (who had taken office after Mayor Gaynor's death in September 1913) refused to accept Waldo's resignation (which would have left the Department without leaders for the first 12 hours after New Year's Eve) and fired him instead.

=== Later career ===
In 1916, Waldo held a commission as Major in the Infantry Officers Reserve Corps. He went into World War I as a major in the 301st Infantry of the National Army in 1917. After serving in France, he was honorably discharged in 1919 and in 1923 was commissioned a colonel in the reserve.

After he was out of office, he stayed involved with political affairs and while Richard Enright was New York City Police Commissioner (appointed by the regular Democratic Mayor John Francis Hylan), Waldo served for a time as a special deputy but resigned in September 1924 to organize the Coolidge Nonpartisan League, a step that "marked his formal renunciation of Tammany Hall in favor of the Republican Party." Around this time, he was mentioned as a possible candidate for governor general of the Philippines.

== Personal life ==
On April 20, 1910, he was married to Virginia Otis Heckscher at the country house of artist Charles H. Ebert in Greenwich, Connecticut. Virginia, a daughter of Robert M. Otis and Helen (née Gordon) Otis of Richmond, Virginia, was twice widowed before their marriage. Her second marriage was to John Gerard Heckscher who died in 1908 (he was the widower of Mary (née Travers) Gray, a daughter of William R. Travers, and the father-in-law of Mayor George B. McClellan Jr.).

He died on August 13, 1927, in his home in Philipse Road in Garrison, New York, of sepsis.

== In popular culture ==
Waldo was portrayed by James Cagney in the 1981 film Ragtime despite the age difference (Cagney was 81 years old when he filmed this movie; the real Rhinelander Waldo was only 32 at the time in which the movie was set and died at age 50.) However, in E.L. Doctorow's original 1975 novel Ragtime, from which the film was adapted, Waldo's role in the narrative is minor while Charles S. Whitman, the real-life Manhattan District Attorney at the time, performs most of the fictional words and deeds that the film assigned to Waldo.

== See also ==
- Fire Department of New York
- Philippine–American War (then known in the U.S. as the "Philippine Insurrection")
- Moro Rebellion
- New York Police Department
- Ragtime – a 1981 motion picture (based on the novel by E. L. Doctorow) featuring a fictionalized Rhinelander Waldo portrayed by James Cagney.

Fire appointments
Preceded by Nicholas J. Hayes	New York City Fire Commissioner; 1910–1911	Succeeded by Joseph Johnson
Police appointments
Preceded by James C. Cropsey	New York City Police Commissioner; 1911–1913	Succeeded by Douglas I. McKay
