= Egbert Benson =

American lawyer and politician (1746-1833)

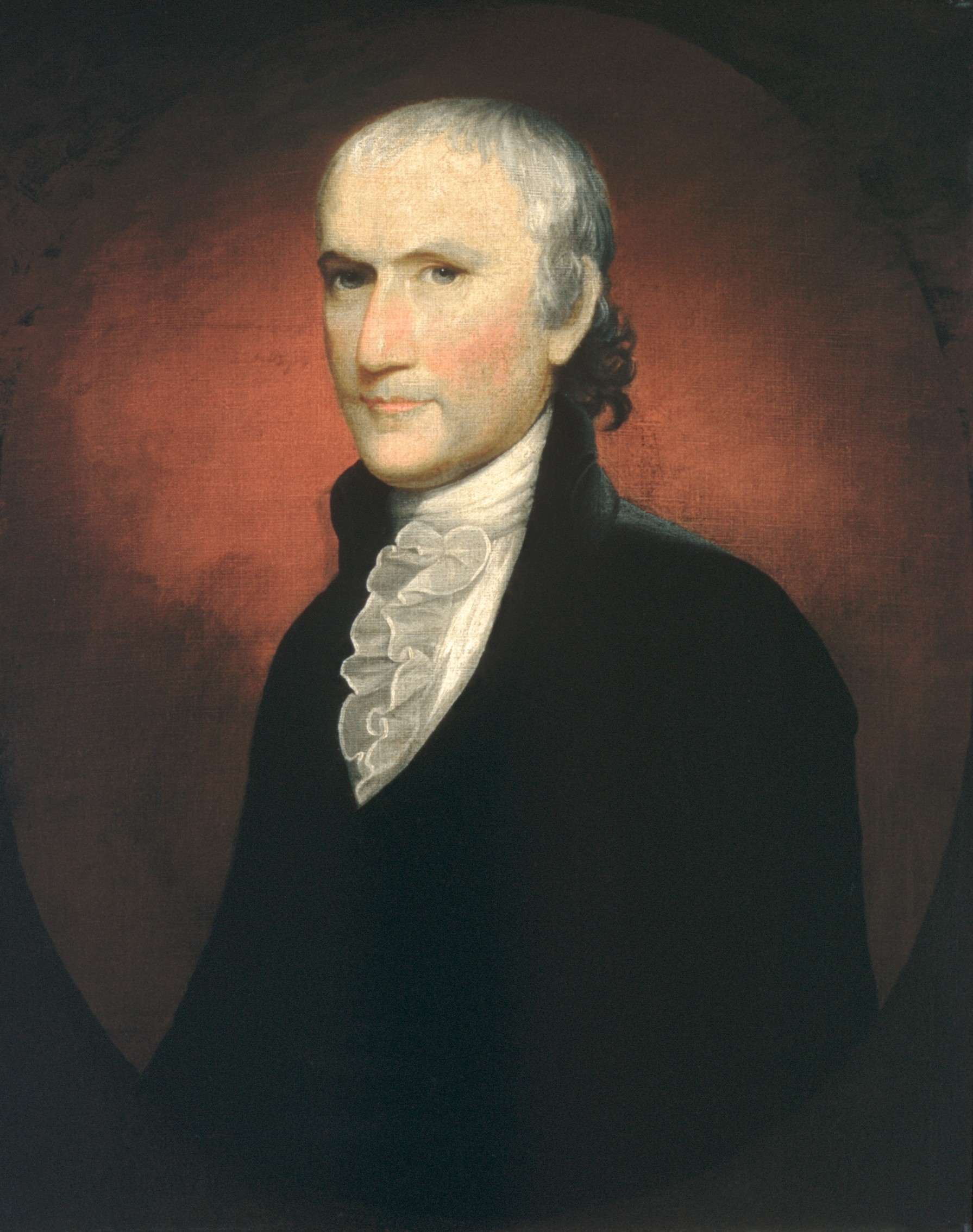
- Portrait by John Vanderlyn, after Gilbert Stuart, c. 1794

Member of the U.S. House of Representatives from New York
- In office March 4, 1813 – August 2, 1813
- Preceded by: William Paulding Jr.
- Succeeded by: William Irving
- Constituency: 2nd district
- In office March 4, 1789 – March 3, 1793
- Preceded by: Seat established
- Succeeded by: Philip Van Cortlandt
- Constituency: 3rd district

Chief Judge of the United States Circuit Court for the Second Circuit
- In office February 20, 1801 – July 1, 1802
- Appointed by: John Adams
- Preceded by: Seat established by 2 Stat. 89
- Succeeded by: Seat abolished

1st Attorney General of New York
- In office May 8, 1777 – May 14, 1788
- Governor: George Clinton
- Preceded by: Office established
- Succeeded by: Richard Varick

Personal details
- Born: June 21, 1746 New York City, Province of New York, British America
- Died: August 24, 1833 (aged 87) Jamaica, New York
- Resting place: Prospect Cemetery; Jamaica, New York
- Party: Federalist
- Relatives: Egbert Benson
- Education: Columbia University (BA)

Egbert Benson (June 21, 1746 – August 24, 1833) was an American lawyer, jurist, politician and Founding Father who represented New York State in the Continental Congress, Annapolis Convention, and United States House of Representatives. He served as a member of the New York constitutional convention in 1788 which ratified the United States Constitution. He also served as the first attorney general of New York, chief justice of the New York Supreme Court, and as the chief United States circuit judge of the United States circuit court for the second circuit.

== Education and career ==
Benson's ancestor, Dirck Benson, who settled in New Amsterdam in 1649, was the founder of the Benson family in America. Egbert Benson was born in New York City in the Province of New York, the son of Robert Benson (1715–1762) and Catherine (Van Borsum) Benson (1718–1794). The Benson family was one of the earliest Dutch families to have settled in Manhattan. In a letter written to Arthur D. Benson, Egbert Benson lived at the corner of Puntine and Fulton streets in the home of William Puntine. (Note: The house was apparently not numbered until 1907, when it became No. 436 Fulton Street. In 1938, Puntine Street became 165th Street, while Fulton Street became Jamaica Avenue.) His home was one of the centers of cultural life in New York City. Benson lived with his maternal grandmother, a widow who lived on Broad Street, at the corner of Beaver, during the early part of his life.

Benson was taught in Dutch, and he learned his catechism in that language. Upon reaching a suitable age, Benson attended the Collegiate School, a school of repute, and prepared himself for college. During this time, he was guided and assisted by Reverend Doctor Barclay, rector of Trinity Church. He was privately educated, then attended King's College (now Columbia University), graduating in 1765. He read law, was admitted to the bar and moved to Red Hook in Dutchess County, New York. He practiced law both there and in New York City. Benson was also honored by Harvard University and Dartmouth College.

A relative of Benson's was Benjamin Benson, a Revolutionary War soldier and member of the committee of correspondence. He signed one of the Articles of Association, or "Association Test", which was preliminary to the Declaration of Independence, at Haverstraw, New York, in May 1775. Egbert Benson was the brother of Lieutenant Colonel Robert Benson and Captain Henry Benson, who commanded an armed vessel in the Revolution.

Benson owned slaves; in the 1790 census, he was recorded as having one slave, and in the 1800 census, two slaves. Despite his personal ownership of slaves, he was involved in the anti-slavery New York Manumission Society.

== Political and judicial service ==
Towards the start of the American Revolutionary War, Benson approved the course of the Sons of Liberty and gave up, in a measure, his professional prospects then brightly opening and devoted himself to his country. He aided the Sons of Liberty, who were in Dutchess County where Benson, as a part of his first efforts, gave proper directions to the political meetings. When the British occupied New York City in 1776, Benson remained in Dutchess County for several years. From 1777 to 1781, Benson served as a member of the New York State Assembly and drafted every important bill passed there in during the Revolution. The county made him the president of their committee of safety and in 1777 sent him to the revolutionary New York State Assembly. When the first state government was organized, Benson was appointed the first New York attorney general and served until 1788. He was elected to the Assembly annually until 1781 and again in 1788.

New York sent Benson as a delegate to the Continental Congress in 1784. Although he was reappointed in 1785, he did not attend sessions. In 1786, he was named by the Legislature to accompany Alexander Hamilton as a delegate to the Annapolis Convention, which issued a call for the United States Constitutional Convention held the following year. He returned to the Congress in 1787 and 1788, and in 1788 attended the New York state convention that ratified the United States Constitution.

When the new federal government was established, Benson was elected from New York's 3rd congressional district to the United States House of Representatives of the 1st and 2nd United States Congresses, serving from March 4, 1789, to March 3, 1793. In 1794, Benson was appointed a justice of the New York Supreme Court, a position he held until 1801.

Benson was part of the three-man commission that decided the location of the St. Croix River in 1798. He was nominated by President John Adams on February 18, 1801, to the United States Circuit Court for the Second Circuit, to the new chief judge seat authorized by 2 Stat. 89. He was confirmed by the United States Senate on February 20, 1801, and received his commission the same day. His service terminated on July 1, 1802, due to abolition of the court.

== Later life ==
Benson returned to the private practice of law in New York City in 1802. He joined other civic leaders to found the New-York Historical Society and served as its first president from 1804 to 1816. He was the author of several books, including Vindication of the Captors of Major Andre, defending the three American Patriots who captured the spy Major John André, which led to the discovery of the plot to surrender West Point to the British by Benedict Arnold.

In 1812, Benson was again elected from New York's 2nd congressional district to the United States House of Representatives of the 13th United States Congress as a Federalist but served only five months before he resigned on August 2, 1813. In December 1813, Benson was elected a member of the American Antiquarian Society.

Benson's writings include A Biographical Sketch of Gouverneur Morris (published in November 1816), and Brief Remarks on the 'Wife' of Washington Irving (published in 1819). Benson also wrote and published in the New York American a series of able and highly interesting articles, in condemnation of what he regarded as the absurd and anti-Christian practice of calling the first day of the week the Sabbath.

He died on August 24, 1833, in Jamaica, Queens, and is buried in the Prospect Cemetery there. His grave has been designated by a historical marker. There is no evidence that he ever married or had children. He is sometimes supposed to be the Egbert Benson who married Maria Conover (1796–1867) on May 17, 1820, but this is not plausible. This is the marriage of his nephew of the same name.

== Descendants and legacy ==
Egbert's oldest brother was clerk of the New York State Senate, Robert Benson (1739–1823), father of his namesake, Egbert Benson.

According to manuscripts and notes found in the Arthur D. Benson manuscript collection at Queens Library, Benson's name was engraved on a bronze tablet on the Butterick Building on 6th Avenue and Spring Street in New York City; this tablet was placed there by the Greenwich Village Historical Society. Hevelyn D. Benson, great-grandnephew of Egbert Benson, sent Jerome D. Greene, director of Harvard's Trancentanery, seven photostats concerning Egbert Benson. Hevelyn Benson was also a member of the New York Historical Society, founded in 1804 by his ancestor, Egbert Benson. Benson also included a photostat of an article in The Eagle from September 16, 1935, which designated Egbert Benson as the man behind the Constitution. The state historical marker for Benson's grave was applied to Senator Thomas C. Desmond, a trustee of the New York State Historical Society, by Hevelyn Benson.

== Notes ==
Legal offices
| Preceded by Office established | Attorney General of New York; 1777–1789 | Succeeded by Richard Varick |
| Preceded by Seat established by 2 Stat. 89 | Chief Judge of the United States Circuit Court for the Second Circuit; 1801–1802 | Succeeded by Seat abolished |
U.S. House of Representatives
| Preceded by Seat established | United States Representative from New York's 3rd congressional district 1789–1793 | Succeeded by Philip Van Cortlandt |
| Preceded by William Paulding Jr. | United States Representative from New York's 2nd congressional district 1813 | Succeeded by William Irving |
