= Gertrude Rhinelander Waldo =

American heiress

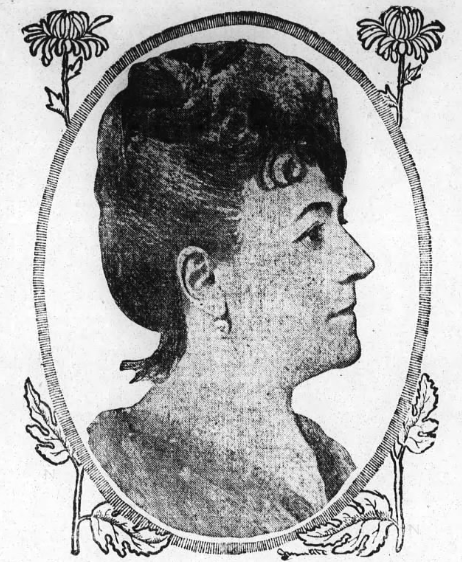
- Waldo before September 1906
- Born: Gertrude Rhinelander; May 12, 1842; New York City, New York, U.S.
- Died: May 27, 1914 (aged 72); New York City, New York, U.S.
- Spouse: Francis William Waldo (m. 1876; died 1878)
- Children: Rhinelander Waldo
- Parent(s): Bernard Rhinelander; Nancy Elizabeth Mary Post Rhinelander
- Relatives: Jotham Post Jr. (grandfather); Frederic W. Rhinelander (cousin)

Gertrude Rhinelander Waldo (May 12, 1842 – May 27, 1914) was an American heiress known for commissioning the Rhinelander Mansion located in Manhattan at 867 Madison Avenue on the south-east corner of 72nd Street, designed in the 1890s by Kimball & Thompson and completed in 1898. According to most sources, she never lived in the mansion, but chose to reside with her sister in a row house across the street from the mansion.

== Early life ==
Gertrude Rhinelander was born in New York on May 12, 1842. She was the youngest of seven children born to Bernard Rhinelander (1800–1844) and Nancy Elizabeth Mary (née Post) Rhinelander (1806–1895). Her father's family ancestors had resided in New York City since the 17th century. Her older siblings included Charles Edward Rhinelander, who married Mathilda Frances Cotheal; Emily Rhinelander, who married Dr. John Watson; and Laura Virginia Rhinelander, who did not marry.

Her maternal grandparents were U.S. Representative Jotham Post Jr. and his second wife, Magdalen (née Blaau) Post. Her paternal grandparents were William Rhinelander and Mary (née Robert) Rhinelander. Rhinelander's great-great grandfather, Philip Jacob Rhinelander, was a German-born French Huguenot who immigrated to America in 1686 following the revocation of the Edict of Nantes and persecution of Protestants in France. He settled in the newly formed French Huguenot community of New Rochelle, where he amassed considerable property holdings that became the basis for the Rhinelander family's wealth. The Rhinelander family acquired farm property on the Upper East Side of Manhattan in the 1700s. This appreciated in value with the expansion of urban development.

== Personal life ==
On June 6, 1876, she married stockbroker Francis William "Frank" Waldo (1836–1878), despite the fact that he had been bankrupted during the Panic of 1873. In May 1877, before Frank's untimely death in 1878, she gave birth to their son, Rhinelander Waldo (1877–1927). He became active in politics and served in succession as the Fire and Police Commissioner of New York.

In 1882, Waldo received an inheritance valued at $360,000 (equivalent to $12,010,345 today) that consisted largely of real estate. By 1889, she had reportedly been in a relationship with lawyer Charles H. Schieffelin. She sued him in 1899 to reclaim $12,000 (equivalent to $430,000 today) which she said he had misappropriated from her. He had said that he was going to invest the money in various railroad securities. In a counterclaim, Schieffelin said that he had invested the money as directed and that the two of them were going to be married. Waldo responded that she would never have married Schieffelin because of his earlier divorce.

Gertrude Waldo died of apoplexy on May 27, 1914. After a funeral at the Hotel Netherland, she was buried at Sleepy Hollow Cemetery in Sleepy Hollow, New York. In 1915, The New York Times reported that at the time of her death, she was over $135,000 (equivalent to $4,296,464 today) in debt, consisting primarily of a pair of loans she received from the L. V. Rhinelander Estate.

=== 72nd Street residence ===
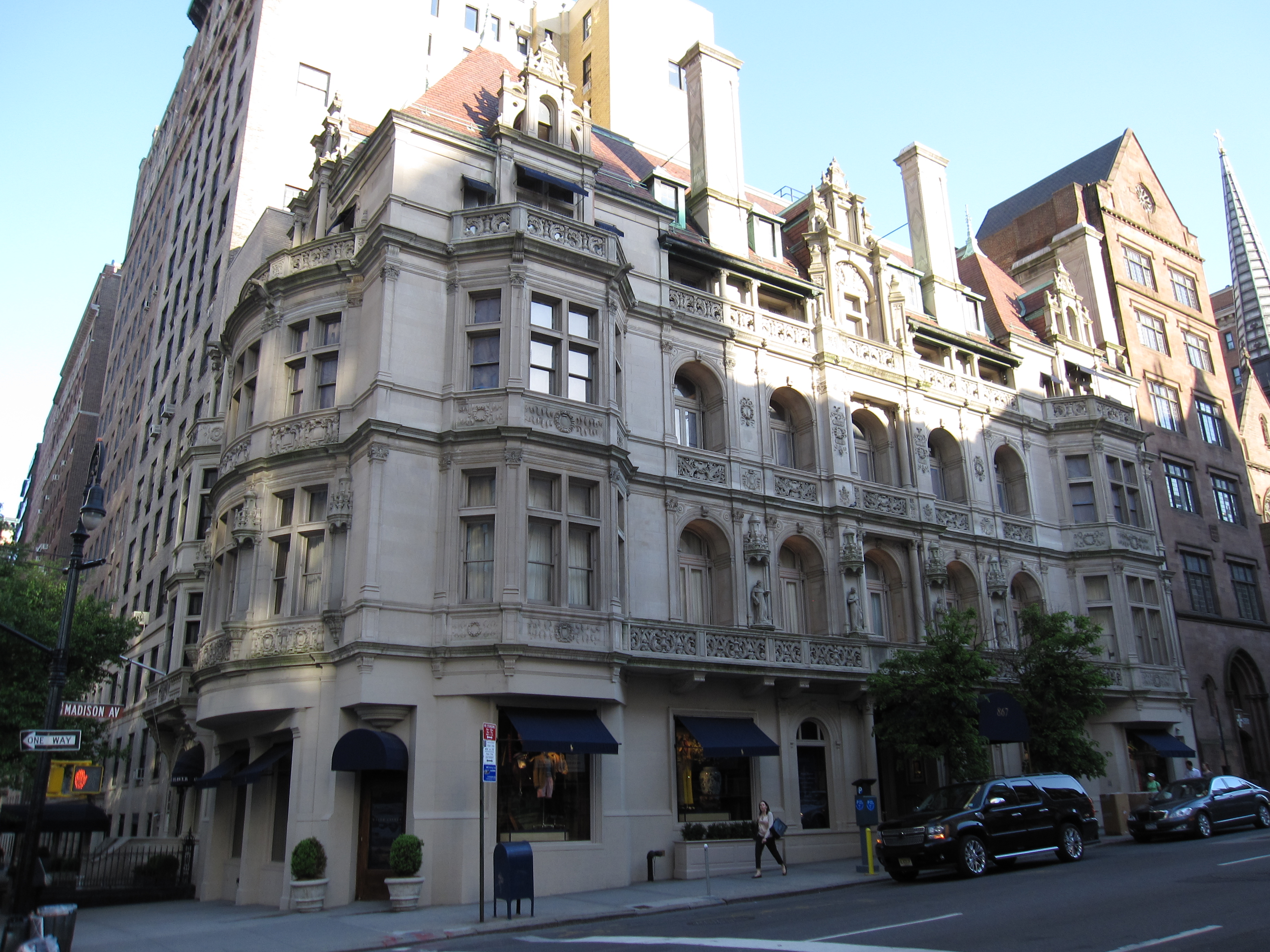
The Rhinelander Mansion.

In 1882 Waldo bought a piece of property located at the corner of 72nd Street and Madison Avenue, but did not develop the site immediately. Construction of the Gertrude Rhinelander Waldo House and a neighboring house on 72nd Street was completed by 1898. The houses were never occupied during Waldo's life, but the reason for this is unknown. Later, facing financial difficulties including owing large amounts on the two homes, Waldo reached an agreement to sell the house through a broker before reneging. In September 1911, Waldo finally let one of the mansions go at foreclosure. The other mansion was sold in 1912.

The Rhinelander Mansion was vacant until 1921 when it was subdivided into commercial use on the street level and two apartments on the four floors above. It now houses the flagship men's clothing store of Polo Ralph Lauren that took 18 months to renovate in 1986.
