= Timeline of the 19th century =

This is a timeline of the 19th century.

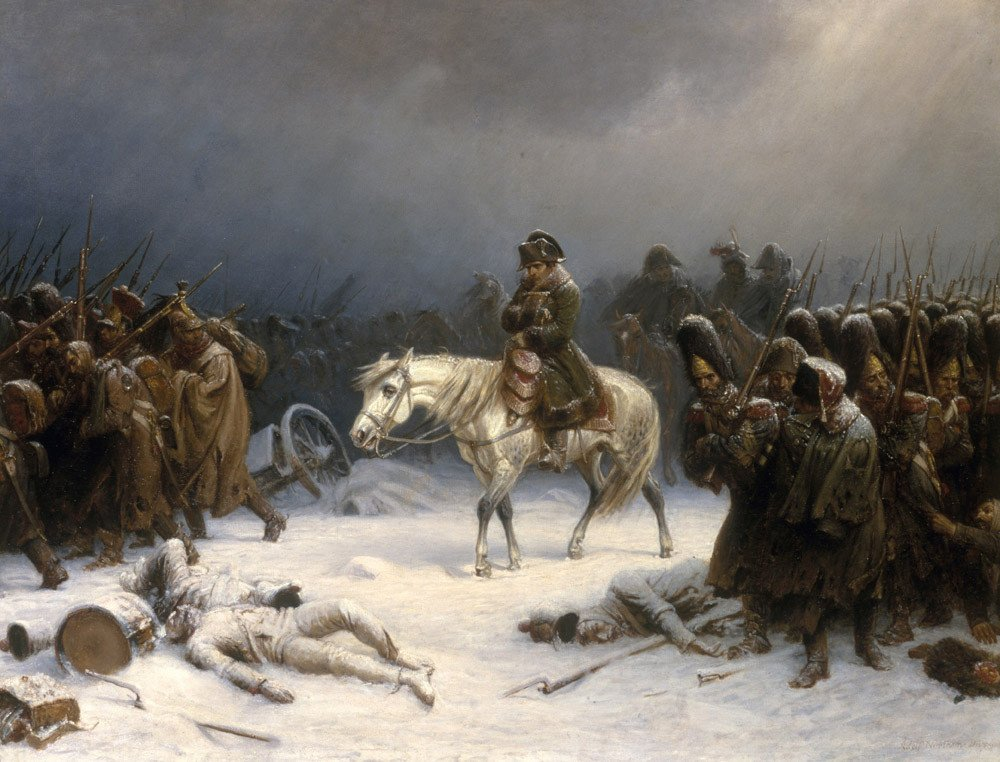
Napoleon's retreat from Russia in 1812. The war swings decisively against the French Empire.

== 1800s ==
=== 1801 ===
- First Barbary War between the United States and the Barbary States of North Africa.
- Italian astronomer Giuseppe Piazzi discovers the dwarf planet Ceres.
- American politician Alexander Hamilton begins publishing the New York Evening Post as the Federalist "Vehicle" for their news.
- Thomas Jefferson elected President of the United States by the House of Representatives, following a tie in the Electoral College.
- The Kingdom of Great Britain and the Kingdom of Ireland merge to form the United Kingdom.
- Ranjit Singh crowned as the Maharaja of the Sikh Empire.
- Napoleon and Pope Pius VII sign the Concordat of 1801 in Paris.
- Alexander I of Russia becomes tsar after the assassination of his father.
- British defeat French at the Second Battle of Abukir.

=== 1802 ===
- Treaty of Amiens between France and the United Kingdom ends the War of the Second Coalition.
- Ludwig van Beethoven performs his Moonlight Sonata for the first time.
- William Cobbett begins weekly Political Register.

=== 1803 ===
- War resumes between Britain and France; this is a renewal of the Napoleonic Wars after a short peace.
- William Symington demonstrates his Charlotte Dundas, the "first practical steamboat".
- The United States almost doubles in size when it buys out France's territorial claims in North America in the Louisiana Purchase. This begins the American westward expansion to the Pacific, later called Manifest Destiny. It involves annexing and conquering land from Mexico, Britain, and Native Americans.
- The Wahhabis of the First Saudi State capture Mecca and Medina.
- First phase of Padri War (to 1825).
- France suppress rebellion and recover Haiti; Toussaint Louverture dies in prison in France.

=== 1804 ===
- 1804–1810: Fulani Jihad in Nigeria.
- 1804–1813: Russo-Persian War.
- 1804–1815: Serbian revolution erupts against the Ottoman rule. Suzerainty of Serbia recognized in 1817.
- Haiti gains independence from France and becomes the first black republic.
- Lewis and Clark Expedition in western U.S.
- Austrian Empire founded by Francis I.
- Napoleon crowns himself Emperor of the French.
- World population reaches 1 billion.
- First steam locomotive begins operation.
- Morphine first isolated.
- British and Foreign Bible Society founded by William Wilberforce and Thomas Charles
- Symphony No. 3 by Beethoven, the "Eroica" marks the start of highly creative "middle period."

=== 1805 ===
- 1805–1848: Muhammad Ali modernizes Egypt.
- Third Coalition mobilizes against France.
- The Battle of Trafalgar, British victory by Admiral Nelson eliminates the French and Spanish fleets. Begins Royal Navy dominance of the seas, a major factor for the success of the British Empire.
- Napoleon decisively defeats an Austrian-Russian army at the Battle of Austerlitz.

=== 1806 ===
- 1806–1812: Russo-Turkish War, Treaty of Bucharest.
- Holy Roman Empire dissolved as a consequence of the Treaty of Pressburg.
- Napoleon makes brother Joseph Bonaparte king of Naples & brother Louis Bonaparte king of Holland.
- Cape Colony becomes part of the British Empire.

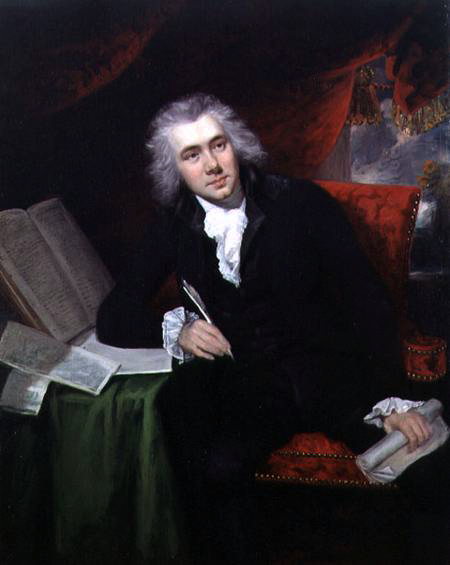
William Wilberforce (1759–1833), politician and philanthropist who was a British leader of the movement to abolish the slave trade.

=== 1807 ===
- Britain and the United States separately make the Slave Trade a criminal act.
- First treaty of Tilsit: Russia allies with France against Britain in the War of the Fourth Coalition
- Second treaty of Tilsit: Napoleon reorganizes Eastern Europe; rump Prussia becomes ally.
- Napoleon's Milan Decree reinforces Continental System and escalates the trade war.
- Royal Navy bombards Copenhagen and seizes Danish fleet.
- Potassium and Sodium are individually isolated by Humphry Davy.
- Beethoven performs his Fifth Symphony.

=== 1808 ===
- 1808–1809: Russia conquers Finland from Sweden in the Finnish War.
- 1808–1814: Spanish guerrillas fight in the Peninsular War.
- Herman Willem Daendels the Governor-general of the Dutch East Indies (1808–1811) begin the construction of Java Great Post Road.
- Sierra Leone becomes a British colony.
- Beethoven premieres his 5th Symphony at the Theater an der Wien in Vienna.

=== 1809 ===
- Napoleon invades the Papal States and adds it to the French Empire, making his young son the King of Rome.
- Pope Pius VII excommunicates Napoleon and is later imprisoned at Savon.
- Napoleon strips the Teutonic Knights of their last holdings in Bad Mergentheim.
- Beethoven's Piano Concerto No. 5, "The Emperor."

== 1810s ==
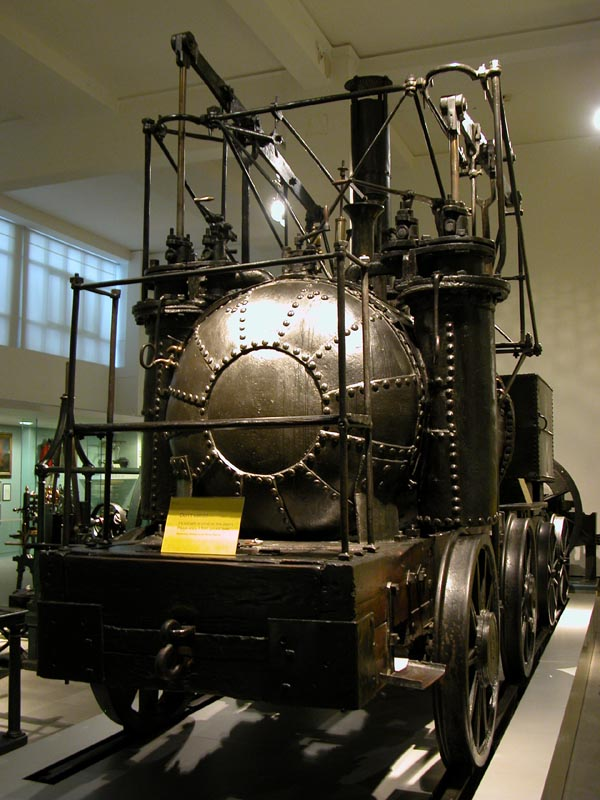
Puffing Billy, 1813 steam locomotive in England

=== 1810 ===
- 1810s–1820s: Most of the Latin American colonies free themselves from the Spanish and Portuguese Empires after the Latin American wars of independence.
- The University of Berlin was founded. Among its students and faculty are Hegel, Marx, and Bismarck. The German university reform proves to be so successful that its model is copied around the world (see History of European research universities).
- The Grito de Dolores begins the Mexican War of Independence.
- The trumpet receives valves.

=== 1811 ===
- May 14: Paraguay declares independence from the Spanish empire (recognized May 15).

=== 1812 ===
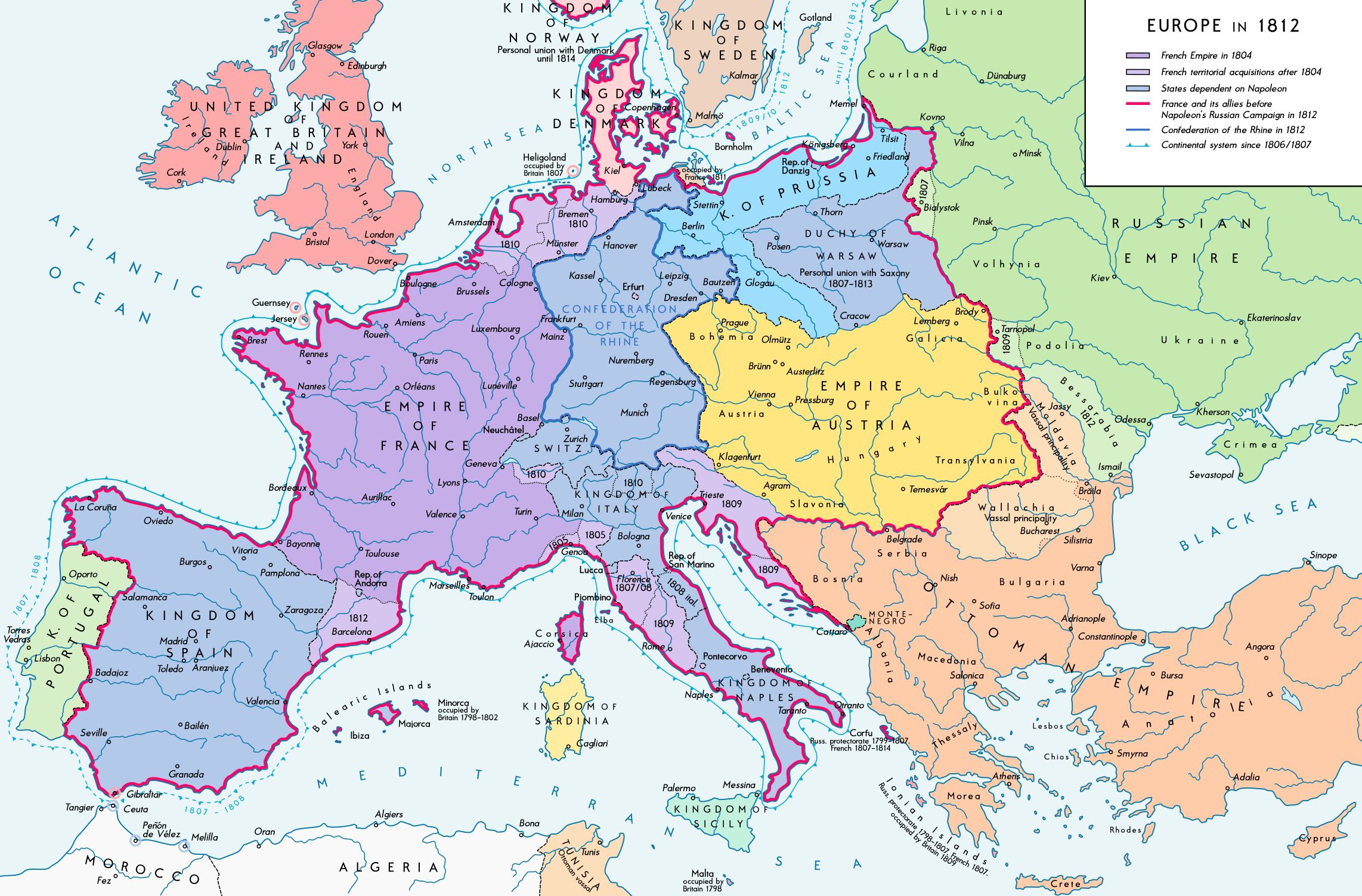
Map of Europe in 1812

- 1812–1815: War of 1812 between the United States and Britain; ends in a draw, except that Native Americans lose power.
- The French invasion of Russia is a turning point in the Napoleonic Wars.
- British Prime Minister Spencer Perceval is assassinated.
- Great Britain experiences widespread economic distress; worst year of Luddite rioting.

=== 1813 ===
- 1813–1837: Afghan-Sikh Wars.
- Jane Austen publishes Pride and Prejudice.
- William Hedley's Puffing Billy demonstrates power of steam locomotives.

=== 1814 ===
- 1814–1816: Territorial disputes and expansionist ambitions start the Anglo-Nepalese War between Nepal (Gurkha Empire) and the British Empire.
- Napoleon abdicates and is exiled to Elba.
- Elisha Collier invents the flintlock revolver.

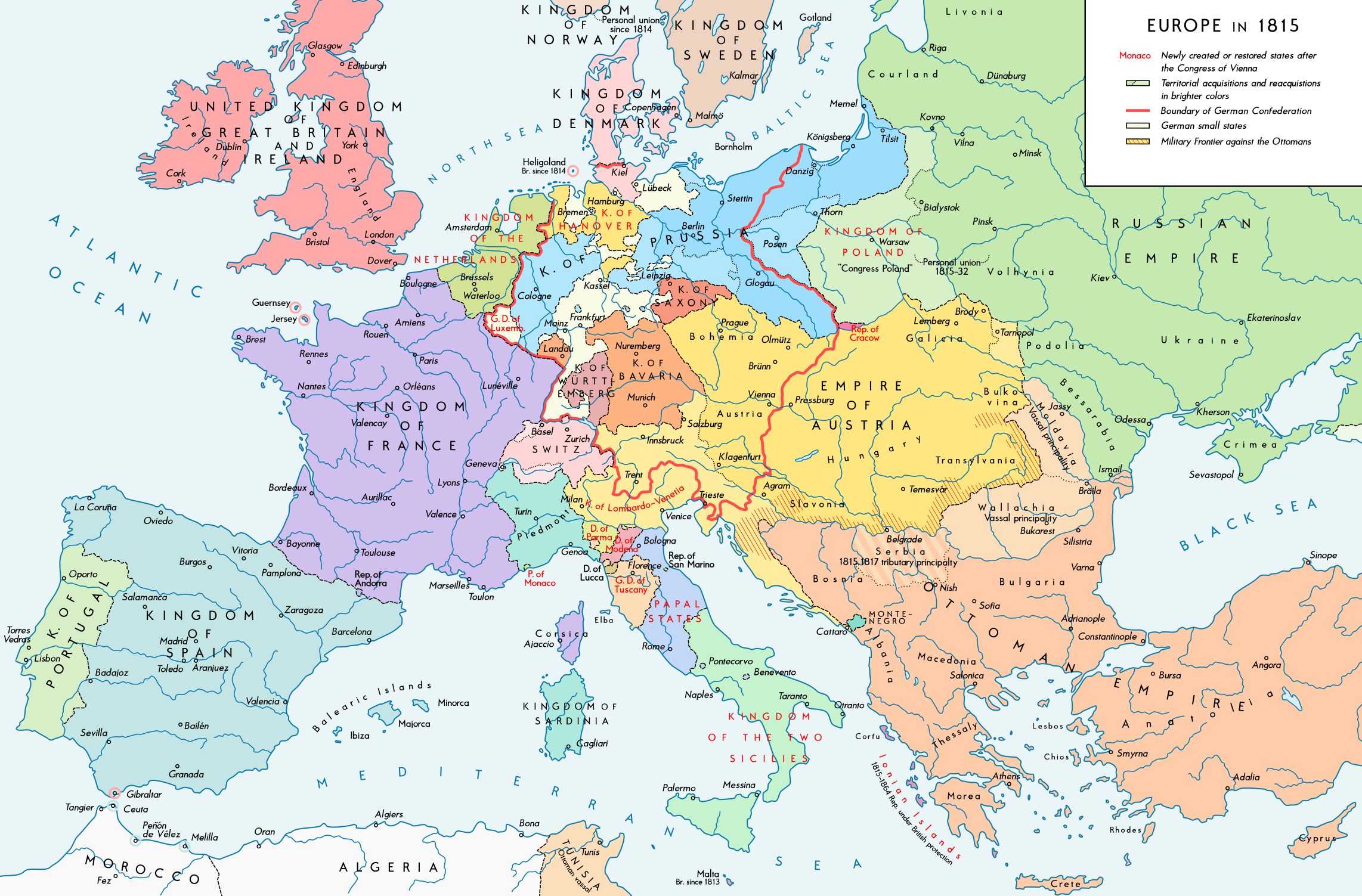
The boundaries set by the Congress of Vienna, 1815.

=== 1815 ===
- April: Mount Tambora in Sumbawa island erupts, becoming the largest volcanic eruption in recorded history, destroying Tambora culture, and killing at least 71,000 people, including its aftermath. The eruption created global climate anomalies known as "volcanic winter".
- The Congress of Vienna redraws the European map. Reaction and conservatism dominate all of Europe. The Concert of Europe attempts to preserve this settlement, but the forces of liberalism and nationalism make for dramatic changes. It marks the beginning of a Pax Britannica which lasts until 1914.
- Napoleon escapes exile and begins the Hundred Days before finally being defeated at the Battle of Waterloo and exiled to St Helena. His defeat brings a conclusion to the Napoleonic Wars.
- Jane Austen publishes Emma in December.

=== 1816 ===
- 1816–1828: Shaka's Zulu Kingdom becomes the largest in Southern Africa.
- 1816–1817: widespread economic distress in Europe.
- Year Without a Summer: Unusually cold conditions wreak havoc throughout the Northern Hemisphere, likely influenced by the 1815 explosion of Mount Tambora.
- Independence of Argentina.
- Dandy horse/velocipede bicycle invented.
- Camera is invented.

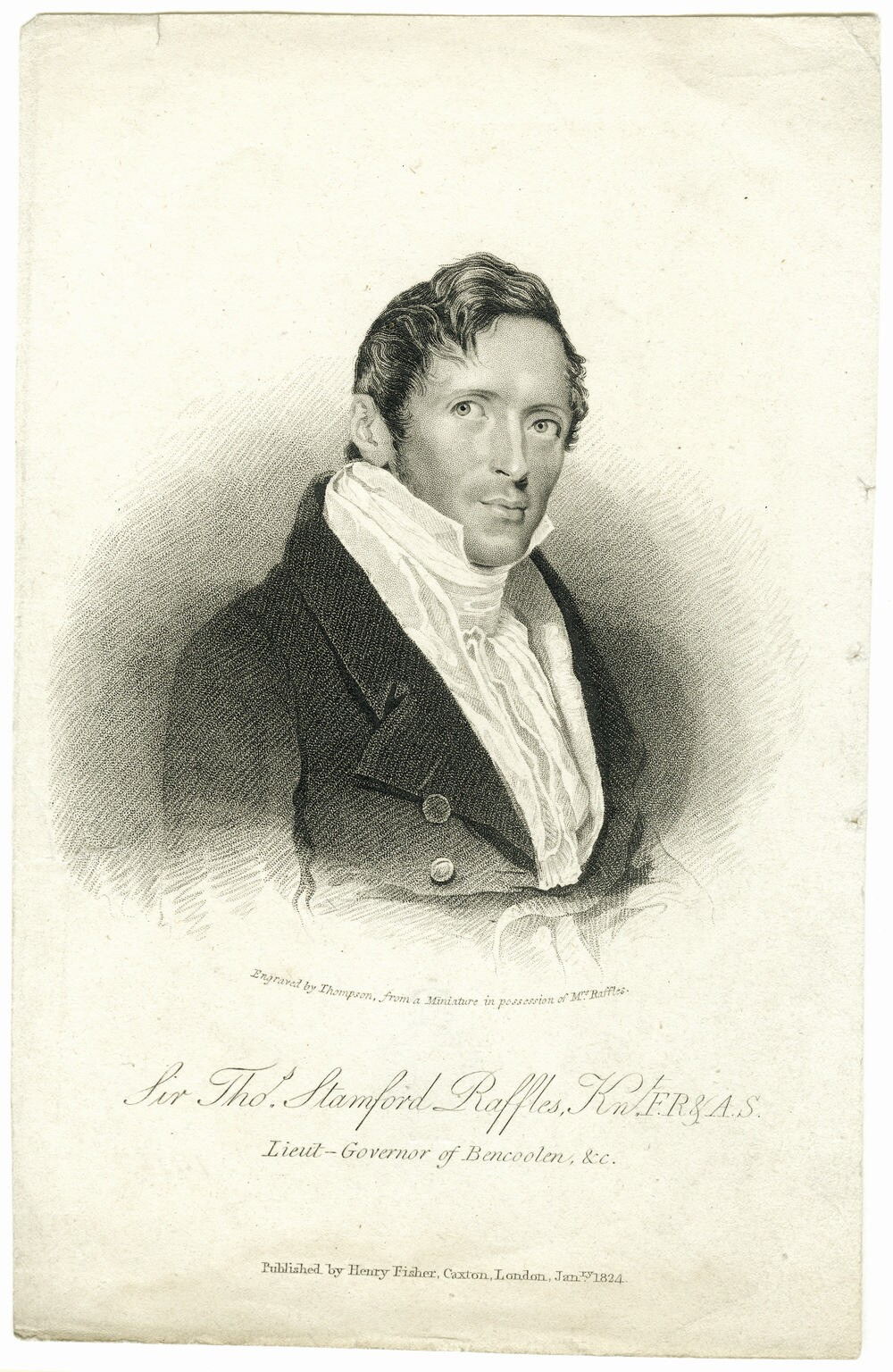
1819: 29 January, Stamford Raffles arrives in Singapore with William Farquhar to establish a trading post for the British East India Company.

=== 1817 ===
- Principality of Serbia becomes suzerain from the Ottoman Empire. Officially independent in 1867.
- First Seminole War begins in Florida.
- Russia commences its conquest of the Caucasus.
- Princess Charlotte of Wales dies following childbirth.

=== 1818 ===
- Mary Shelley publishes Frankenstein; or, The Modern Prometheus.
- Independence of Chile.
- The Old Vic is established (under the name of the Royal Coburg).

=== 1819 ===
- Trustees of Dartmouth College v. Woodward.
- McCulloch v. Maryland.
- John Keats writes his odes of 1819.
- Peterloo Massacre in England.
- The modern city of Singapore is established by the British East India Company.
- Théodore Géricault paints his masterpiece The Raft of the Medusa, and exhibits it in the French Salon of 1819 at the Louvre.

== 1820s ==
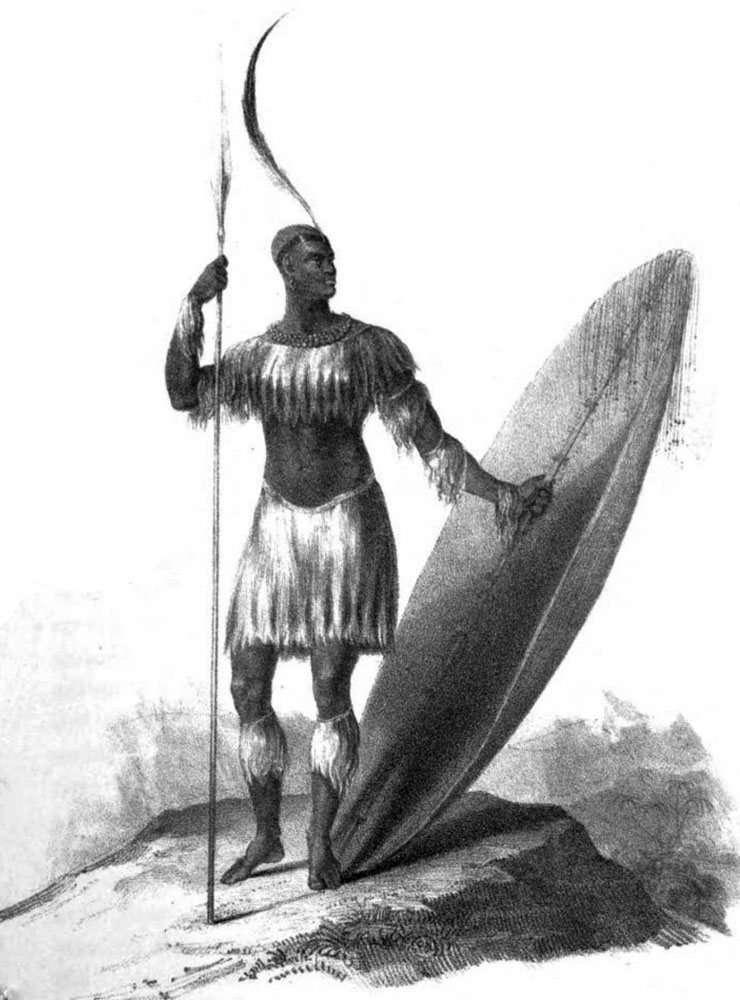
1816: Shaka rises to power over the Zulu Kingdom. Zulu expansion was a major factor of the Mfecane ("Crushing") that depopulated large areas of southern Africa.

=== 1820 ===
- 1820–1835: At least 5000 Mexicans die in Apache raids, and 100 settlements are destroyed.
- 1820–1842: In the Industrial Revolution child labor was exploited more than ever, especially in cotton factories and mines.
- Missouri Compromise on the slavery issue in U.S.
- Revolutions of 1820 in Southern Europe.
- Liberia founded by the American Colonization Society for freed American slaves.
- Dissolution of the Maratha Empire in India.

=== 1821 ===
- 1821–1830: Greece becomes the first country to break away from the Ottoman Empire after the Greek War of Independence.
- Navarino massacre of Turks living in Greece.
- Napoleon Bonaparte dies in exile on the island of Saint Helena.
- Mexico gains independence from Spain with the Treaty of Córdoba.
- Peru declares its independence from Spain.

=== 1822 ===
- 1822–1823: First Mexican Empire, as Mexico's first post-independent government, ruled by Emperor Agustín I of Mexico.
- Prince Pedro of Brazil proclaimed the Brazilian independence on 7 September. On 1 December, he was crowned as Emperor Dom Pedro I of Brazil.
- Denmark Vesey is arrested and executed for attempting to incite a slave insurrection in South Carolina.

=== 1823 ===
- 1823–1887: The British Empire annexed Burma (now also called Myanmar) after three Anglo-Burmese Wars.
- Monroe Doctrine declared by US President James Monroe in cooperation with Britain.

=== 1824 ===
- Premiere of Beethoven's Ninth Symphony.
- Cadbury opens a chocolate shop in Birmingham, England.
- Gibbons v. Ogden, a landmark decision in which the U.S. Supreme Court rules that the power to regulate interstate commerce encompassed the power to regulate navigation.

Decembrists at the Senate Square in Saint Petersburg, Russia.

=== 1825 ===
- 1825–1828: The Cisplatine War results in the independence of Uruguay.
- Erie Canal opens in New York connecting the Great Lakes to the Atlantic Ocean.
- First isolation of aluminum.
- Independence of Bolivia.
- The Stockton and Darlington Railway, the first public railway in the world, opens in England.
- The Decembrist revolt in Russia is suppressed.
- Java War. (to 1830)

=== 1826 ===
- 1826–1829: Founding of University College London in 1826 and King's College London in 1829.
- 1826–1828: After the final Russo-Persian War, the Persian Empire took back territory lost to Russia from the previous war.
- Auspicious Incident; the destruction of the Janissaries in the Ottoman Empire.
- Prime Minister Robert Peel reforms English criminal law and redefines law of property.
- American Samuel Morey patents the internal combustion engine.

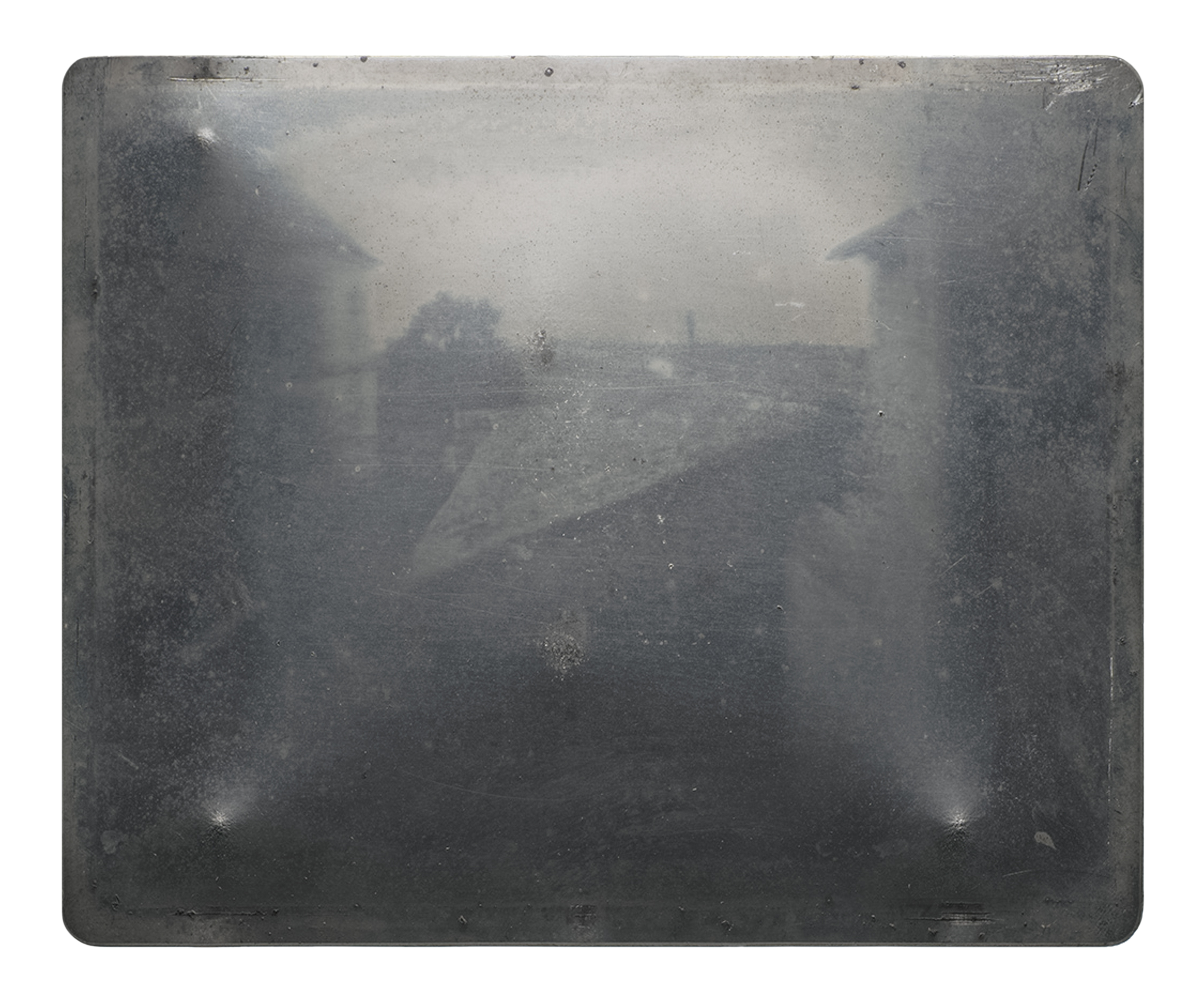
The earliest saved photographic image (Heliograph on pewter plate) by Nicéphore Niépce, taken at Le Gras, France, in 1827.

=== 1827 ===
- Allies destroy Turkish fleet at the Battle of Navarino. With the Treaty of London, Britain, France and Russia guarantee the independence of Greece.
- Nicéphore Niépce invents photography.
- Deaths of William Blake and Ludwig van Beethoven.

=== 1828 ===
- 1828–1832: Black War in Tasmania leads to the near extinction of Aboriginal Tasmanians.
- Prime Minister Robert Peel secures repeal of Test & Corporation Acts, This gives religious liberty to Nonconformists in Britain but deeply splits Tory party.

=== 1829 ===
- First electric motor built.
- Robert Peel founds the Metropolitan Police Service, the first modern police force.
- Treaty of Edirne following the Russo-Turkish War of 1828-1829.
- Johann Wolfgang von Goethe's Faust premieres.
- Gioachino Rossini, William Tell Italian opera.

== 1830s ==
=== 1830 ===
- The Church of Christ of Latter Day Saints is established by Joseph Smith as prophet and president of the Church.
- Opening of the Liverpool and Manchester Railway.
- U.S. Congress passes the Indian Removal Act which authorized the President to negotiate removal treaties with many native tribes living east of the Mississippi. This act led to the forced removal of several native tribes over the next century.
- Anglo-Russian rivalry over Afghanistan, the Great Game, commences and concludes in 1895.
- July Revolution in France.
- The Belgian Revolution in the United Kingdom of the Netherlands led to the creation of Belgium.
- Greater Colombia dissolved and the nations of Colombia (including modern-day Panama), Ecuador, and Venezuela took its place.
- November Uprising in Poland against Russia; it fails.
- End of the Diponegoro war. The whole area of Yogyakarta and Surakarta Manca nagara Dutch seized on September 27, Klaten Agreement determines a fixed boundary between Surakarta and Yogyakarta and permanently divide the kingdom of Mataram was signed by Sasradiningrat, Pepatih Dalem Surakarta, and Danurejo, Pepatih Dalem Yogyakarta. Mataram is de facto and de jure controlled by the Dutch East Indies.
- Felix Mendelssohn, "Hebrides" overture
- Hector Berlioz issues "Symphonie fantastique", an early highlist of Romanticism

=== 1831 ===
- August 22: Nat Turner and a band of slaves lead an insurrection in Southampton County, Virginia. The rebellion is put to an end two days later. As many as two hundred African Americans, including innocent victims, died as a result.
- 1831–1833: Egyptian–Ottoman War.
- 1831–1836: Charles Darwin's journey aboard HMS Beagle.
- France invades and occupies Algeria.
- Ioannis Kapodistrias, the First Governor of Greece is murdered at Nauplion.
- The Belgian constitution is ratified and Leopold I is crowned as first "King of the Belgians".
- Great Bosnian uprising against Ottoman rule occurs.
- Chief John Ross of the Cherokee Nation defends Cherokee rights and sovereignty in the U.S. Supreme Court case The Cherokee Nation v. The State of Georgia
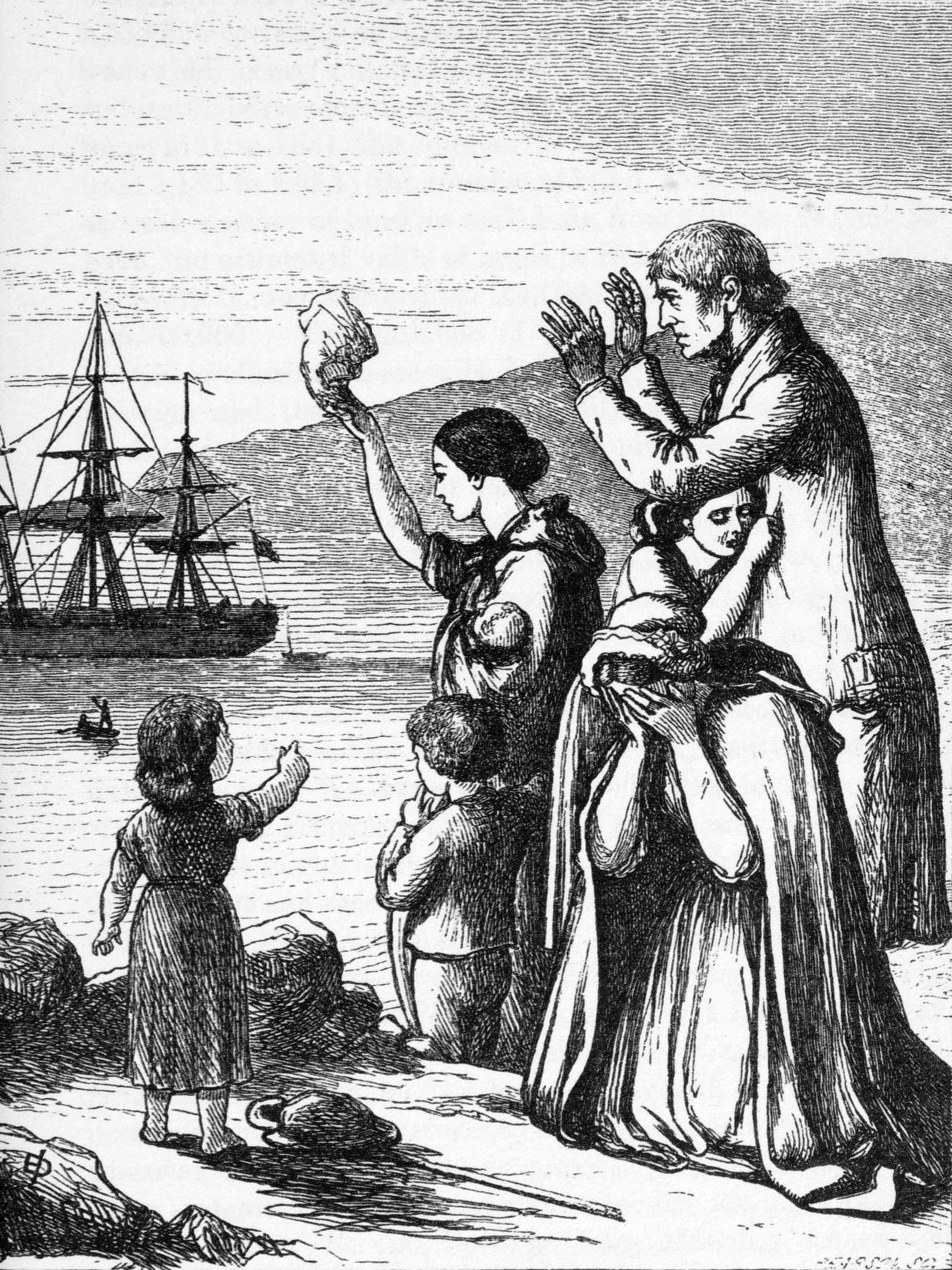
  Emigrants leaving Ireland. From 1830 to 1914, almost 5 million Irish people went to the United States alone.
- November Uprising ends with crushing defeat for Poland in the Battle of Warsaw.
- Second phase of Padri War. (to 1838)

=== 1832 ===
- The British Parliament passes the Great Reform Act.
- Évariste Galois invents Group theory in mathematics.

=== 1833 ===
- 1833–1876: Carlist Wars in Spain.
- Slavery Abolition Act 1833 bans slavery throughout the British Empire; owners are reimbursed.
- General Trades Union founded in New York City.

=== 1834 ===
- 1834–1859: Imam Shamil's rebellion in Russian-occupied Caucasus.
- The German Customs Union is formed.
- Spanish Inquisition officially ends.
- Britain amends the Poor Law demanding that any paupers requesting assistance must go to a workhouse.
- German historian Leopold von Ranke develops seminar method based on original sources.

=== 1835 ===
- 1835–1836: The Texas Revolution in Mexico results in the short-lived Republic of Texas.
- September laws restrict freedom of press, in France.

=== 1836 ===
- 1836–1839: War of the Confederation begins between Chile and the Peru-Bolivian Confederation, ending with Chilean victory.
- Battle of the Alamo ends with defeat for Texan separatists.
- Battle of San Jacinto; Texas forces capture Mexican General Santa Anna.
- Samuel Colt popularizes the revolver and sets up a firearms company to manufacture his invention of the Colt Paterson revolver, a six-bullet firearm shot one by one without reloading manually.

=== 1837 ===
- 1837–1838: Rebellions of 1837 fail in Canada.
- 1837–1901: Queen Victoria reigns during the apex of the British Empire; this is the Victorian era.
- Buckingham Palace becomes the official residence of the British monarch.
- Telegraphy patented.
- Charles Dickens publishes Oliver Twist.
- Death of Alexander Pushkin.

=== 1838 ===
- 1838–1840: Civil war in the Federal Republic of Central America led to the foundings of Guatemala, El Salvador, Honduras, Nicaragua, and Costa Rica.
- 1838–1857: Rise of Chartism, a working-class reform movement in Britain.
- By this time, 46,000 Native Americans have been forcibly relocated in the Trail of Tears.

=== 1839 ===
- 1839–1851: Uruguayan Civil War.
- 1839–1860: After the First and Second Opium Wars, France, the United Kingdom, the United States and Russia gain many trade and associated concessions from China resulting in the start of the decline of the Qing dynasty.
- 1839–1919: Anglo-Afghan Wars lead to stalemate and the establishment of the Durand line.
- Kingdom of Belgium declared.

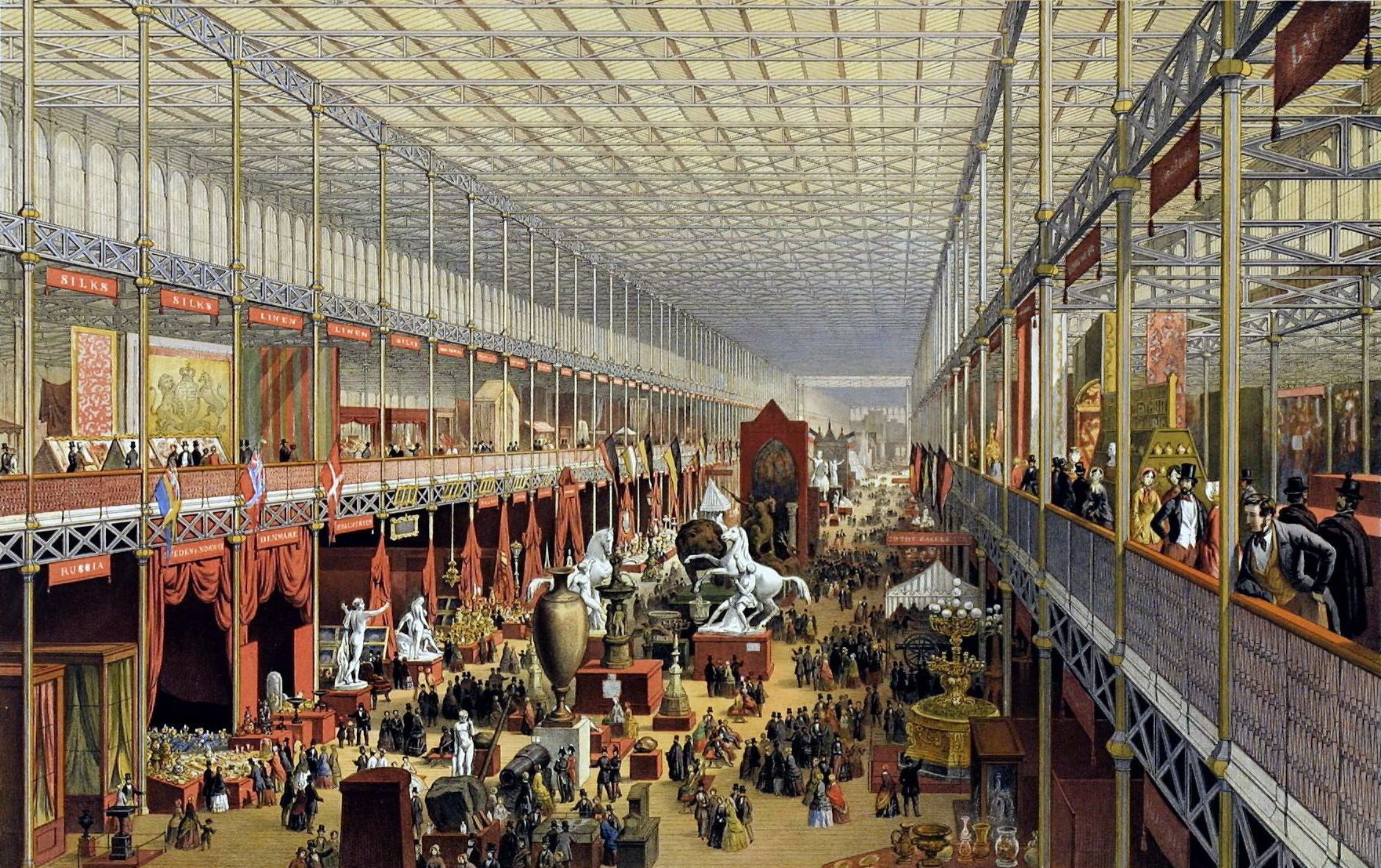
The Great Exhibition in London. Starting during the 18th century, the United Kingdom was the first country in the world to industrialise.

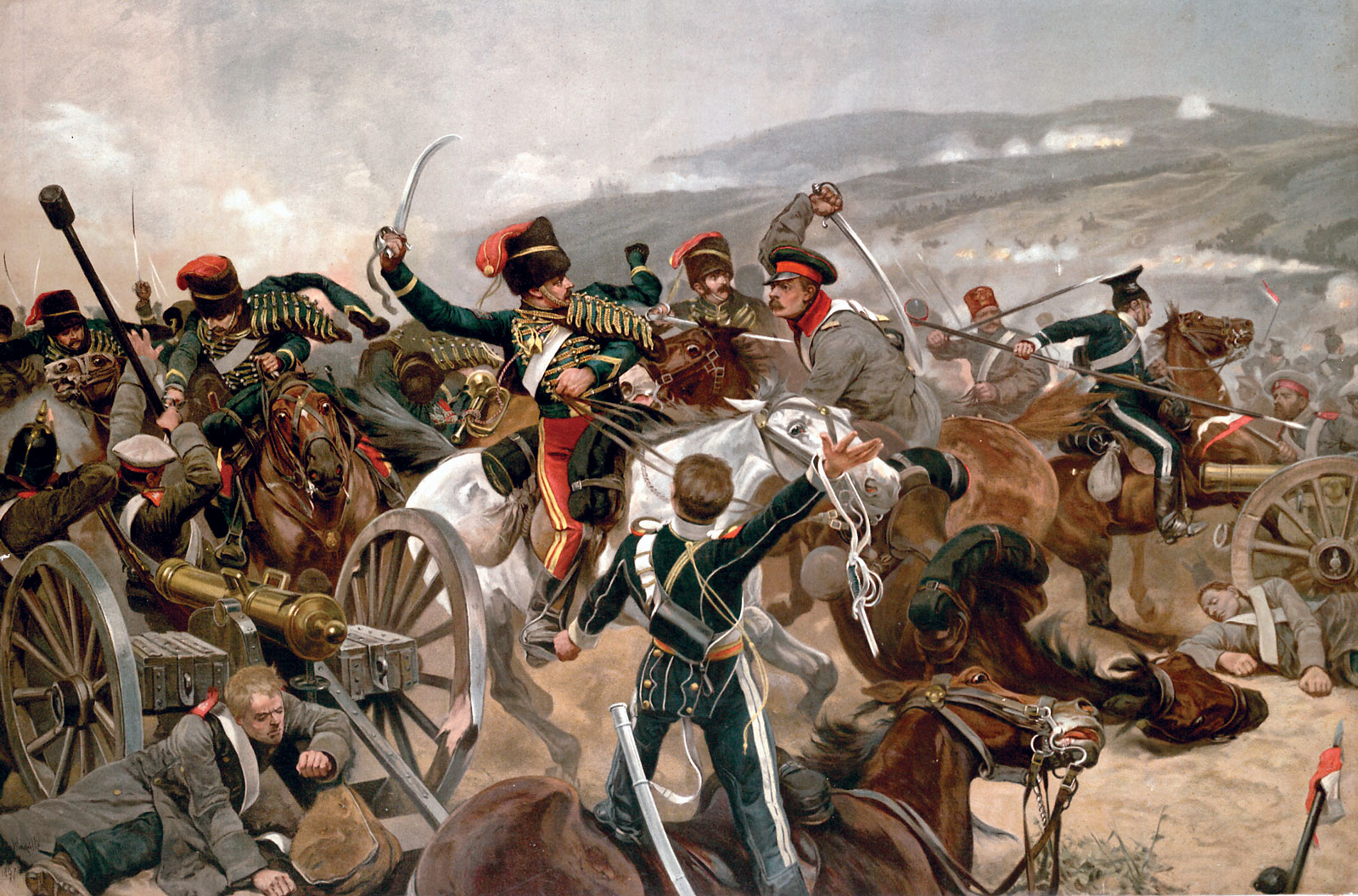
The Charge of the Light Brigade during the Crimean War.

== 1840s ==
=== 1840 ===
- 1840s: Oregon Trail as well as the Santa Fe Trail, Platte Road and Mormon Trail provided Westward mobility into California and Oregon. Motivations for use of such trails include market opportunity and escape from religious persecution.
- 1840s: Railway Mania sweeps UK and Ireland.
- New Zealand is founded, as the Treaty of Waitangi is signed by the Māori and British.
- Upper and Lower Canada are merged into the Province of Canada.

=== 1841 ===
- The word "dinosaur" is coined by Richard Owen.
- William Henry Harrison is the first US president to die in office.

=== 1842 ===
- Treaty of Nanking cedes Hong Kong to the British.
- Anaesthesia used for the first time.
- The Coal Mines Act forbade the use of boys younger than ten and women in the mines.

=== 1843 ===
- The first wagon train sets out from Missouri.
- Short stories A Christmas Carol and The Tell-Tale Heart published.

=== 1844 ===
- May 23: Persian Prophet the Báb announces his revelation, founding Bábísm. He announced to the world of the coming of "He whom God shall make manifest". He is considered the forerunner of Bahá'u'lláh, the founder of the Baháʼí Faith.
- October 22: Millerite movement awaits the Second Advent of Jesus Christ. Christ's non-appearance becomes known as the Great Disappointment.
- First publicly funded telegraph line in the world—between Baltimore and Washington—sends demonstration message on 24 May, ushering in the age of the telegraph. This message read "What hath God wrought?" (Bible, Numbers 23:23)
- The great auk is rendered extinct.
- Dominican War of Independence from Haiti.
- Heinrich Heine coins the term "Lisztomania" in regards to the public's frenzied reaction to the pianist Franz Liszt.
- Treaty of Wanghia was signed by the United States and China.

=== 1845 ===
- 1845–1846: First Anglo-Sikh War.
- 1845–1849: The Great Famine of Ireland leads to the Irish diaspora.
- 1845–1872: The New Zealand Wars.
- Unification of the Kingdom of Tonga under Tāufaʻāhau (King George Tupou I).
- Lunacy Act 1845 passes through Parliament.
- Texas annexed by the United States and becomes the 28th state.

=== 1846 ===
- 1846–1848: The Mexican–American War leads to Mexico's cession of much of the modern-day Southwestern United States.
- 1846–1847: Mormon migration to Utah.
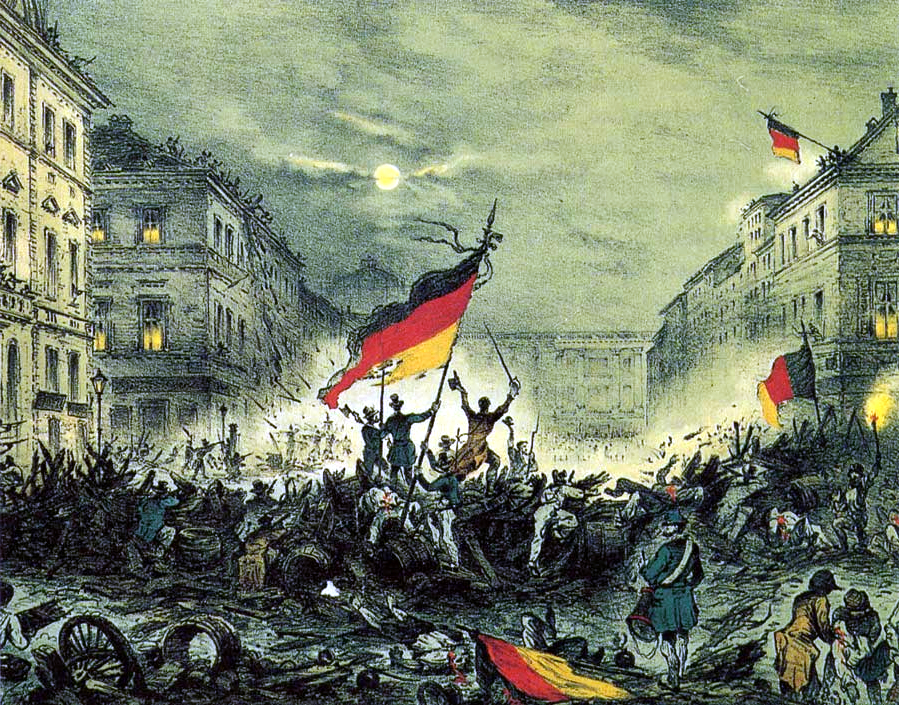
  Liberal and nationalist pressure led to the European revolutions of 1848.
- The Wilmot Proviso unsuccessfully attempts to ban slavery in western territories acquired after the Mexican-American War.
- The Oregon Treaty is signed between the United Kingdom and the United States, ceding the modern states of Oregon, Washington, and Idaho, as well as parts of Wyoming and Montana, to the United States.
- 1846–1878: Ultraconservative Pope Pius IX battles modernity.

=== 1847 ===
- 1847–1901: The Caste War of Yucatán.
- The Brontë sisters publish Jane Eyre, Wuthering Heights and Agnes Grey.
- Ignaz Semmelweis proposes hand washing as a way to stop the spread of diseases.

=== 1848 ===
- 1848–1849: Second Anglo-Sikh War.
- 1848–1858: California Gold Rush.
- The Communist Manifesto published.
- Wisconsin enters the union.
- Revolutions of 1848 across Europe; crushed by conservatives.
- Seneca Falls Convention is the first women's rights convention in the United States and leads to the strive for women's suffrage.
- William Holman Hunt, John Everett Millais and Dante Gabriel Rossetti found the Pre-Raphaelite Brotherhood.

=== 1849 ===
- The first boatloads of gold prospectors arrive in California, giving them the nickname 49ers.
- Roman Republic's constitutional law becomes the first to abolish capital punishment.
- The safety pin and the gas mask are invented.
- Earliest recorded air raid, as Austria launches from land and from the ship SMS Vulcano some 200 incendiary balloons against Venice.
- Sikh Empire dissolves as a result of the Second Anglo-Sikh War.

== 1850s ==
=== 1850 ===
- 1850–1864: Taiping Rebellion is the bloodiest conflict of the century, leading to the deaths of 20 million people.
- The Little Ice Age ends around this time.
- Alfred Tennyson is appointed Poet Laureate after the death of William Wordsworth.

=== 1851 ===
- 1851–1852: The Platine War ends and the Empire of Brazil has the hegemony over South America.
- 1851–1860s: Victorian gold rush in Australia.
- The Great Exhibition in London was the world's first international Expo or World Fair.
- Louis Napoleon assumes power in France in a coup.
- Herman Melville publishes Moby-Dick.

=== 1852 ===
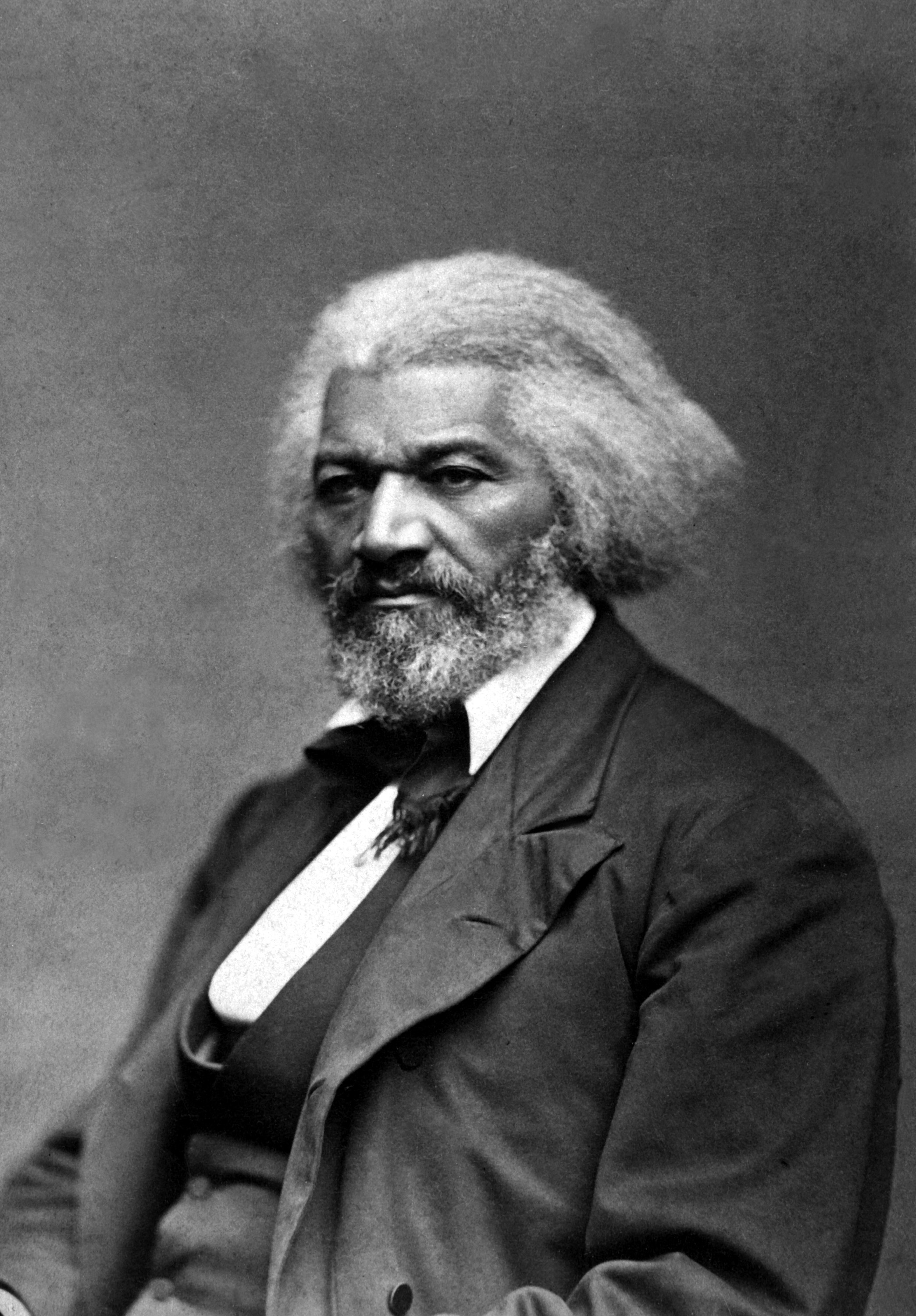
After escaping from slavery in Maryland, Frederick Douglass became a national leader of the abolitionist movement in Massachusetts and New York, becoming famous for his oratory and incisive antislavery writings.

- Frederick Douglass delivers his speech "The Meaning of July Fourth for the Negro" in Rochester, New York.
- King Victor Emmanuel the Second names Count Camillo di Cavour prime minister of Piedmont, thus kickstarting the push for Italian unification.
- Balmoral Castle is bought by the British royal family.

=== 1853 ===
- 1853–1856: Crimean War; France and Britain defend the Ottoman Empire and defeat Russia.
- William Wells Brown (1814–1884) wrote first novel published by an African American, Clotel.
- Twelve Years a Slave is a memoir and slave narrative by American Solomon Northup as told to and edited by David Wilson.
- United States Commodore Matthew C. Perry threatens the Japanese capital Edo with gunships, demanding that they agree to open trade.

=== 1854 ===
- 1854–1855: Siege of Sevastapol; city falls to French and British forces.
- Battle of Balaclava and the Charge of the Light Brigade.
- The Convention of Kanagawa formally ends Japan's policy of isolation. This would open up two ports in Japan to American ships and offered protection to American crews.
- Kansas–Nebraska Act passed.
- SS Arctic disaster: The steamship SS Arctic collides with the SS Vesta and sinks off the coast of Newfoundland.

=== 1855 ===
- Bessemer process enables steel to be mass-produced.
- Walt Whitman publishes Leaves of Grass.
- Cocaine is isolated by Friedrich Gaedcke.

=== 1856 ===
- Rana dynasty of Nepal established by Jung Bahadur Rana.
- World's first oil refinery in Romania.
- Neanderthal man first identified. Age still unknown.
- Guerrilla warfare broke out within the two Kansas governments; President Pierce allied with the proslavery regime.

=== 1857 ===
- 1857–1858: Indian Rebellion of 1857: The British Empire assumes control of India from the East India Company.
- Dred Scott decision denies citizenship to African-Americans.
- Joseph Whitworth designs the first long-range sniper rifle.

=== 1858 ===
- British Empire in India was established and lasted for the next 89 years.
- Minnesota enters the union.
- Second Treaty of Kanagawa: Treaty would place low tariff on American goods further opening United States and Japanese relations.
- Invention of the phonautograph, the first true device for recording sound.

=== 1859 ===
- 1859–1869: Suez Canal is constructed.
- Construction of Big Ben is completed.
- John Brown's raid on Harpers Ferry.
- Charles Darwin publishes On the Origin of Species.

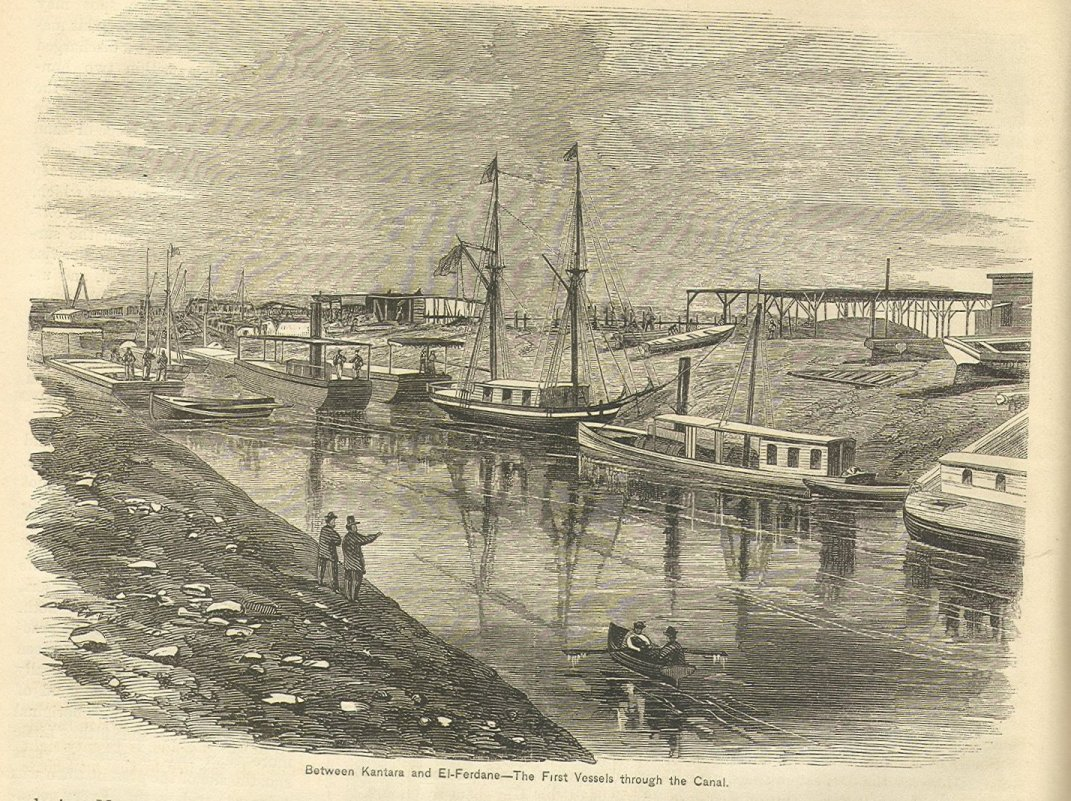
The first vessels sail through the Suez Canal.

== 1860s ==
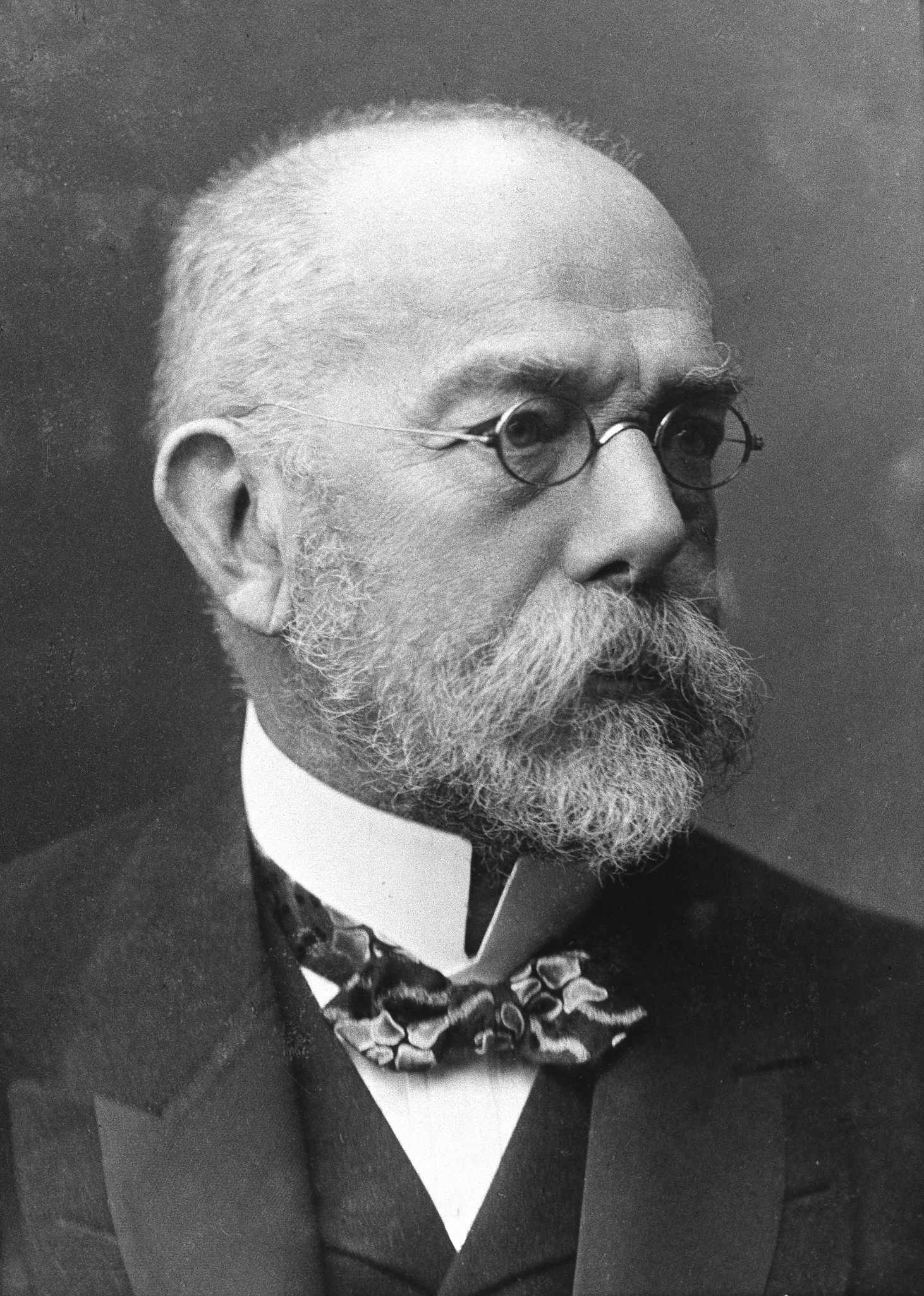
Robert Koch discovered the tuberculosis bacilli. The disease killed an estimated 25 percent of the adult population of Europe during the 19th century.

The first batch of recordings of audio Made in April 1860. The recordings include a tuning fork, Au clair de la lune, opening lines of Torquato Tasso's Aminta, vocal scale and Fly, little bee.

David Livingstone, Scottish explorer and missionary in Africa.

=== 1860 ===
- Giuseppe Garibaldi launches the Expedition of the Thousand.
- The Pony Express started.
- Édouard-Léon Scott de Martinville creates the first audio recording of the human voice.

=== 1861 ===
- 1861–1865: American Civil War between the Union and seceding Confederacy.
- 1861–1867: French intervention in Mexico and the creation of the Second Mexican Empire, ruled by Maximilian I of Mexico and his consort Carlota of Mexico.
- Russia abolishes serfdom.
- Death of Prince Albert.
- James Clerk Maxwell publishes On Physical Lines of Force, formulating the four Maxwell's Equations.

=== 1862 ===
- 1862–1877: Muslim Rebellion in north-west China.
- The Pony Express ended.
- Victor Hugo publishes Les Misérables.
- French gain first foothold in Southeast Asia.

=== 1863 ===
- 1863–1865: Polish uprising against the Russian Empire.
- June 3: An earthquake leaves Manila in ruins.
- November 30: Andres Bonifacio, founder of the Katipunan, was born.
- United States President Abraham Lincoln issues the Emancipation Proclamation. Lincoln issued a preliminary on September 22, 1862, warning that in all states still in rebellion (Confederacy) on January 1, 1863, he would declare their slaves "then, thenceforward, and forever free." The Thirteenth Amendment to the Constitution, ratified in 1865, officially abolished slavery in the entire country.
- Bahá'u'lláh declares his station as "He whom God shall make manifest". This date is celebrated in the Baháʼí Faith as The Festival of Ridván.
- Formation of the International Red Cross is followed by the adoption of the First Geneva Convention in 1864.
- First section of the London Underground opens.
- France annexes Cambodia.
- Édouard Manet exhibits his painting The Luncheon on the Grass, sparking public outrage.
- Gordon (slave) Gordon, or "Whipped Peter", was an enslaved African American who escaped from a Louisiana plantation in March 1863.

=== 1864 ===
- 1864–1866: The Chincha Islands War was an attempt by Spain to regain its South American colonies.
- 1864–1870: The Paraguayan War ends Paraguayan ambitions for expansion and destroys much of the Paraguayan population.
- May 21: Circassian genocide.
- June: The first railway track in Indonesia was laid between Semarang and Tanggung, Central Java by the Dutch colonial government.
- July 23: Apolinario Mabini, the Brains of the Revolution, was born.

=== 1865 ===
- 1865–1877: Reconstruction in the United States; Slavery is banned in the United States by the Thirteenth Amendment to the United States Constitution.
- April 9: Robert E. Lee surrenders the Army of Northern Virginia (26,765 troops) to Ulysses S. Grant at Appomattox Courthouse, Virginia, effectively ending the American Civil War.
- April 14: United States President Abraham Lincoln is assassinated by actor and Confederate sympathiser John Wilkes Booth, while attending a performance at Ford's Theater, Washington, D.C. He dies approximately nine hours after being shot on April 15, 1865.
- Gregor Mendel formulates his laws of inheritance.
- Lewis Carroll publishes Alice's Adventures in Wonderland.

=== 1866 ===
- 1866–1868: Famine in Finland.
- 1866–1869: After the Meiji Restoration, Japan embarks on a program of rapid modernization.
- Successful transatlantic telegraph cable follows an earlier attempt in 1858.
- Austro-Prussian War results in the dissolution of the German Confederation and the creation of the North German Confederation and the Austrian-Hungarian Dual Monarchy.

=== 1867 ===
- 1867–1869: Famine in Sweden.
- The United States purchases Alaska from Russia.
- Canadian Confederation formed.
- Alfred Nobel invents dynamite.
- The Principality of Serbia passes a Constitution which defines its independence from the Ottoman Empire. International recognition followed in 1878.
- The Luxembourg Crisis: diplomatic confrontation between France and Prussia on the status of Luxembourg and the towns fortifications are torn down.
- The Marquess of Queensberry Rules for boxing are published.

=== 1868 ===
- 1868–1878: Ten Years' War between Cuba and Spain.
- Safety bicycle invented.
- The Expatriation Act of 1868 is approved by the U.S. Congress, one of the early blows which would eventually lead to the death of the common law doctrine of perpetual allegiance.
- The Fourteenth Amendment to the United States Constitution is approved.
- Cro-Magnon man first identified.
- Michael Barrett is the last person to be publicly hanged in England.
- The Batavian Museum (today National Museum of Indonesia) was officially opened by Dutch East Indies government.

=== 1869 ===
- Leo Tolstoy publishes War and Peace.
- First transcontinental railroad completed in United States on 10 May. – United States
- Dmitri Mendeleev created the Periodic table.
- The Suez Canal opens linking the Mediterranean to the Red Sea.

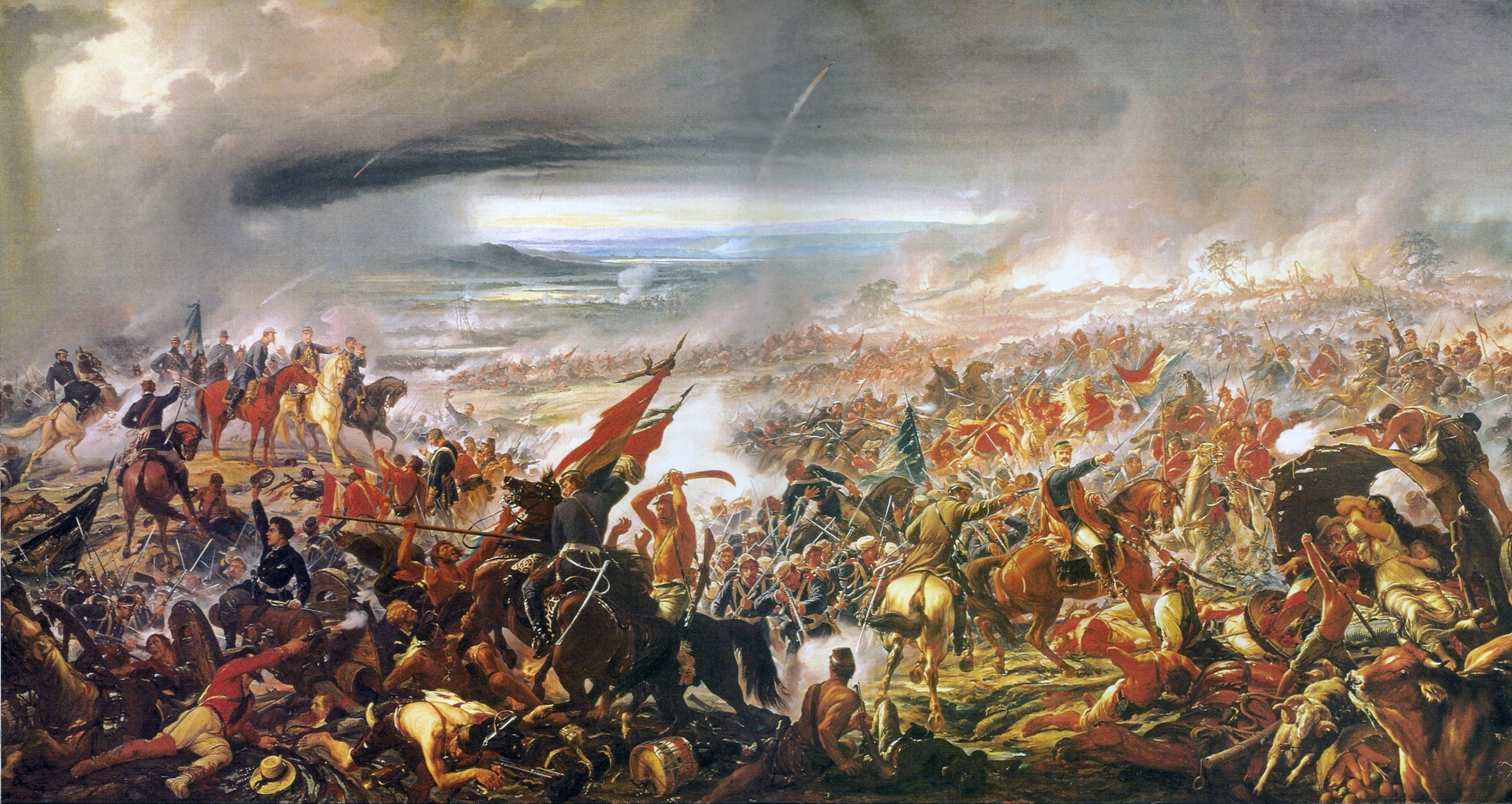
From 1865 to 1870 Paraguay lost more than half of its population in the Paraguayan War against Brazil, Argentina, and Uruguay.

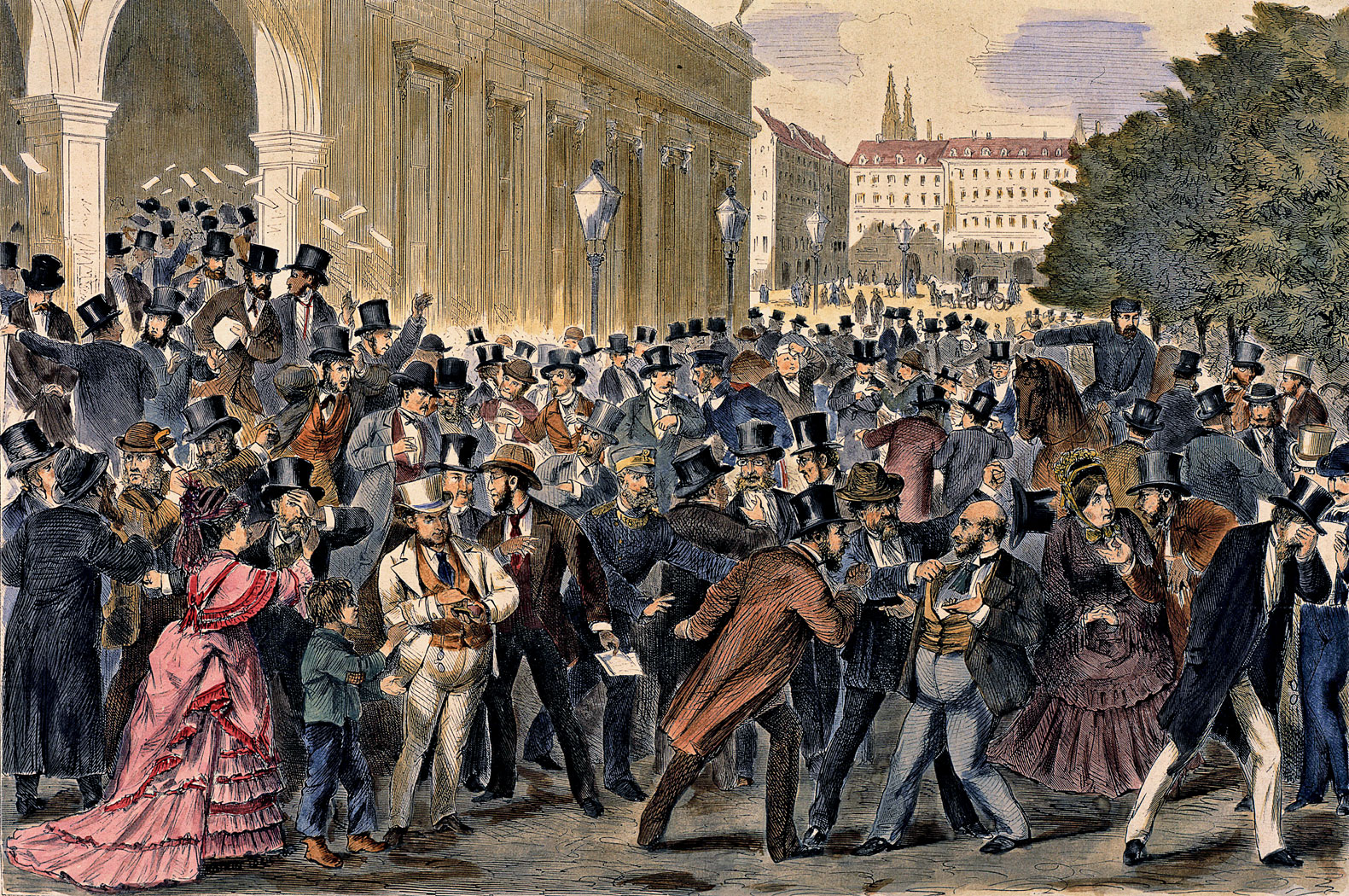
Black Friday, 9 May 1873, Vienna Stock Exchange. The Panic of 1873 and Long Depression followed.

== 1870s ==
=== 1870 ===
- 1870–1871: The Franco-Prussian War results in the unifications of Germany and Italy, the collapse of the Second French Empire and the emergence of a New Imperialism.
- 1870–1890: Long Depression in Western Europe and North America.
- Rasmus Malling-Hansen's invention, the Hansen Writing Ball, becomes the first commercially sold typewriter.
- Official dismantling of the Cultivation System and beginning of a 'Liberal Policy' of deregulated exploitation of the Netherlands East Indies.

=== 1871 ===
- 1871–1872: Famine in Persia is believed to have caused the death of 2 million.
- 1871–1878: In Germany, Otto von Bismarck attacks the privileges of the Catholic Church in the Kulturkampf ("Culture War").
- 1871–1914: Second Industrial Revolution.
- Royal Albert Hall opens in London.
- The Paris Commune briefly rules the French capital.
- The feudal system is dismantled in Japan.
- Henry Morton Stanley meets Dr. David Livingstone near Lake Tanganyika.

=== 1872 ===
- February 17: Filipino priests José Burgos, Mariano Gomez and Jacinto Zamora, collectively known as Gomburza, are executed in Bagumbayan Fields, Manila, Philippines by the authorities of New Spain, on charges of subversion arising from the 1872 Cavite mutiny.
- Yellowstone National Park, the first national park, is created.
- Susan B. Anthony is fined $100 for voting in the 1872 U.S. presidential election.
- The first recognised international soccer match, between England and Scotland, is played.

=== 1873 ===
- The Panic of 1873 starts the "Long Depression".
- Maxwell's A Treatise on Electricity and Magnetism published.
- The samurai class is abolished in Japan.
- Blue jeans and barbed wire are invented.
- The beginning of the bloody Aceh War for Dutch occupation of the province.

=== 1874 ===
- 1874–1875: First Republic in Spain.
- The Société Anonyme Coopérative des Artistes Peintres, Sculpteurs, and Graveurs, better known as the Impressionists, organize and present their first public group exhibition at the Paris studio of the photographer Nadar.
- The Home Rule Movement is established in Ireland.
- The British East India Company is dissolved.

=== 1875 ===
- 1875–1900: 26 million Indians perish in India due to famine.
- First Kentucky Derby is held.
- HMS Challenger surveys the deepest point in the Earth's oceans, the Challenger Deep.
- Georges Bizet's opera Carmen premiers in Paris.

=== 1876 ===
- 1876–1879: 13 million Chinese die of famine in northern China.
- 1876–1914: The massive expansion in population, territory, industry and wealth in the United States is referred to as the Gilded Age.
- Bulgarians instigate the April Uprising against Ottoman rule.
- Richard Wagner's Ring Cycle is first performed in its entirety.
- Queen Victoria becomes Empress of India.
- Battle of the Little Bighorn leads to the death of General Custer and victory for the alliance of Lakota, Cheyenne and Arapaho.
- Karl G. Maeser is born.

=== 1877 ===
- 1877–1878: Following the Russo-Turkish War, the Treaty of Berlin recognizes formal independence of the Principality of Serbia, Montenegro and Romania. Bulgaria becomes autonomous.
- August 17: Henry McCarty (who later becomes Billy the Kid) kills a blacksmith named Francis Cahill who becomes his first murder victim.
- Great Railroad Strike in the United States may have been the world's first nationwide labour strike.
- Crazy Horse surrenders and is later killed.
- Asaph Hall discovers the moons of Mars.
- Thomas Edison invents the phonograph.
- The first test cricket match, between England and Australia, is played.

=== 1878 ===
- First commercial telephone exchange in New Haven, Connecticut.
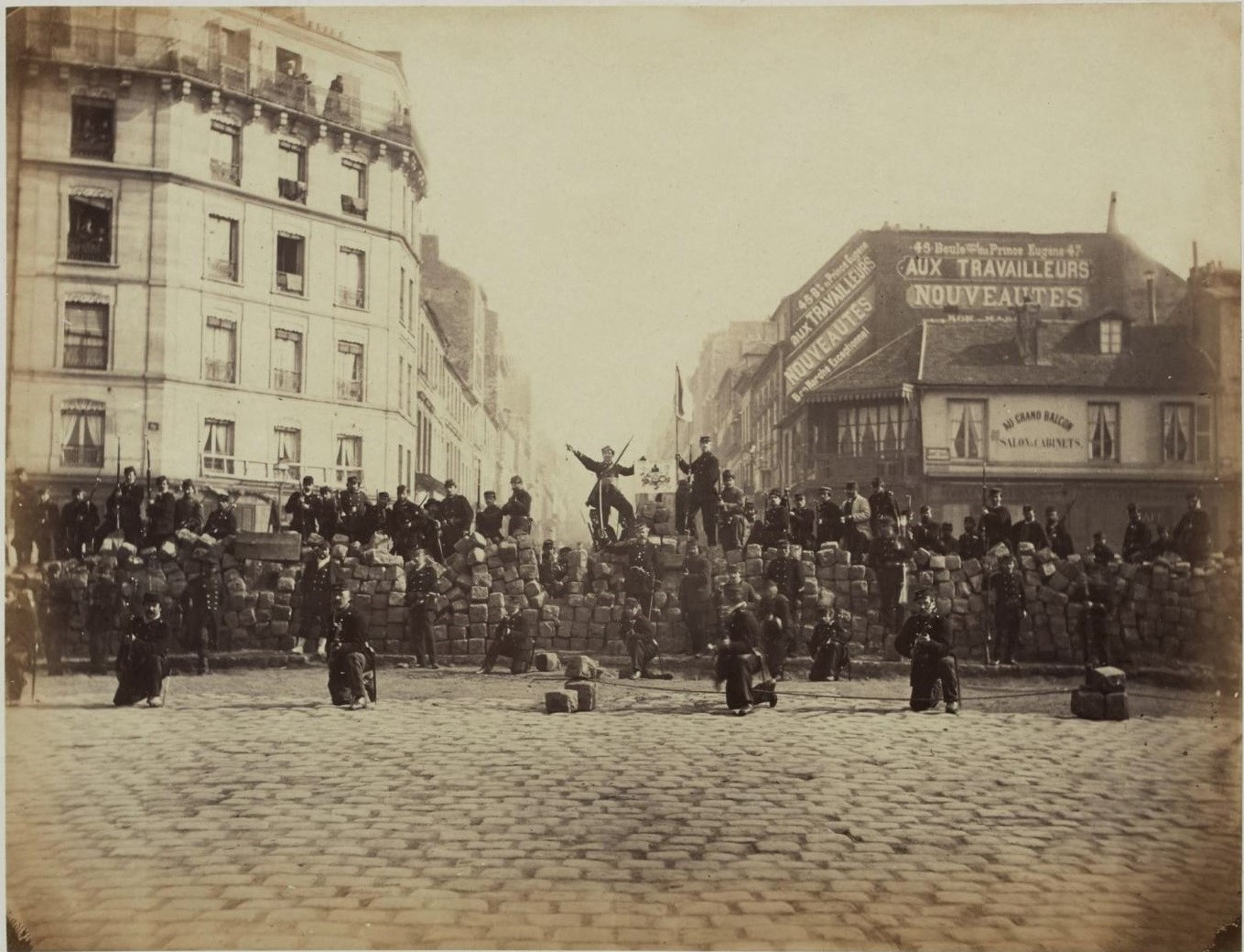
  A barricade in the Paris Commune, 18 March 1871. Around 30,000 Parisians were killed, and thousands more were later executed.

=== 1879 ===
- 1879–1880: Little War against Spanish rule in Cuba leads to rebel defeat.
- 1879–1883: Chile battles with Peru and Bolivia over Andean territory in the War of the Pacific.
- 1879–1884: Belgium is engulfed in a political crisis, dubbed the First School War, over the role of religion in state education.
- April 21: Kartini was born in Jepara, today the date is commemorated as women's emancipation day in Indonesia.
- Anglo-Zulu War in South Africa.
- Thomas Edison tests his first light bulb.

== 1880s ==
=== 1880 ===
- 1880–1881: the First Boer War.

=== 1881 ===
- 1881–1882: The Jules Ferry laws are passed in France establishing free, secular education.
- 1881–1899: The Mahdist War in Sudan.
- Tsar Alexander II is assassinated.
- Wave of pogroms begins in the Russian Empire.
- Gunfight at the O.K. Corral. Sitting Bull surrenders.
- First electrical power plant and grid in Godalming, Britain.
- President James A. Garfield is assassinated.

=== 1882 ===
- The British invasion and subsequent occupation of Egypt.

=== 1883 ===
- Krakatoa volcano explosion, one of the largest in modern history.
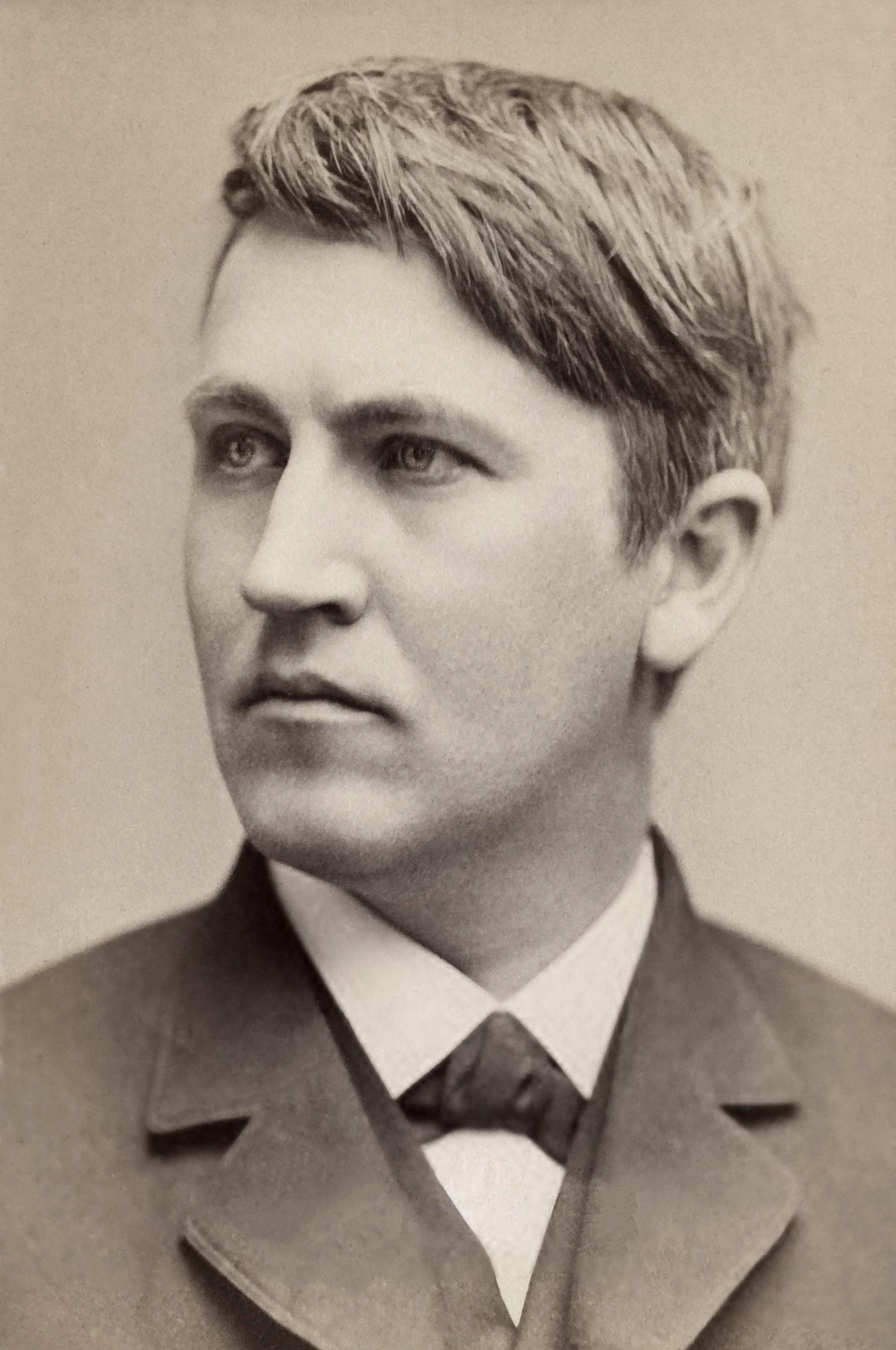
  Thomas Edison was an American inventor, scientist, and businessman who developed many devices that greatly influenced life around the world, including the phonograph, the motion picture camera, and a long-lasting, practical electric light bulb.
- The quagga is rendered extinct.
- Robert Louis Stevenson's Treasure Island is published.

=== 1884 ===
- 1884–1885: The Berlin Conference signals the start of the European "scramble for Africa".
- 1884–1885: The Sino-French War led to the formation of French Indochina.
- First electric car produced by Thomas Parker in Wolverhampton.
- Siege of Khartoum.
- Germany gains control of Cameroon.
- Mark Twain publishes Adventures of Huckleberry Finn.
- Hiram Maxim invents the first self-powered Machine gun.

=== 1885 ===
- Louis Pasteur creates the first successful vaccine against rabies for a young boy who had been bitten 14 times by a rabid dog.
- Karl Benz produced the first car with an internal combustion engine.
- King Leopold II of Belgium establishes the Congo Free State as a personal fiefdom.
- Britain establishes a protectorate over Bechuanaland (modern Botswana).
- Singer begins production of the 'Vibrating Shuttle'. which would become the most popular model of sewing machine.
- Rock Springs massacre: White miners rioted, killing at least 28 Chinese immigrant miners.

=== 1886 ===
- Strange Case of Dr. Jekyll and Mr. Hyde by Robert Louis Stevenson is published.
- Burma is presented to Queen Victoria as a birthday gift.
- Karl Benz sells the first commercial automobile.
- Construction of the Statue of Liberty (formally Liberty Englightening the World)
- Coca-Cola is developed.

=== 1887 ===
- The British Empire takes over Balochistan.
- Arthur Conan Doyle publishes his first Sherlock Holmes story, A Study in Scarlet.

=== 1888 ===
- Schoolhouse Blizzard devastates the Dakota Territory in the US killing 235 people, many of them children coming home from school
- National Geographic Society founded
- Lawn Tennis Association founded in London
- Year of the Three Emperors in Germany marks the beginning of Kaiser Wilhelm II's 30-year reign.
- Louis Le Prince records the Roundhay Garden Scene, the earliest surviving film.
- Jack the Ripper murders occur in Whitechapel, London.
- Slavery banned in Brazil.
- Founding of the shipping line Koninklijke Paketvaart-Maatschappij (KPM) that supported the unification and development of the colonial economy.

=== 1889 ===
- The Mayerling Incident: Crown Prince Rudolf of Austria and Baroness Mary Vetsera die in a suicide pact.
- Eiffel Tower is inaugurated in Paris.
- Mirza Ghulam Ahmad establishes the Ahmadiyya Muslim Community, a reform sect of Islam.
- End of the Brazilian Empire and the beginning of the Brazilian Republic.
- Vincent van Gogh paints The Starry Night.
- Moulin Rouge opens in Paris.

First motor bus in history: the Benz Omnibus, built in 1895 for the Netphener bus company.

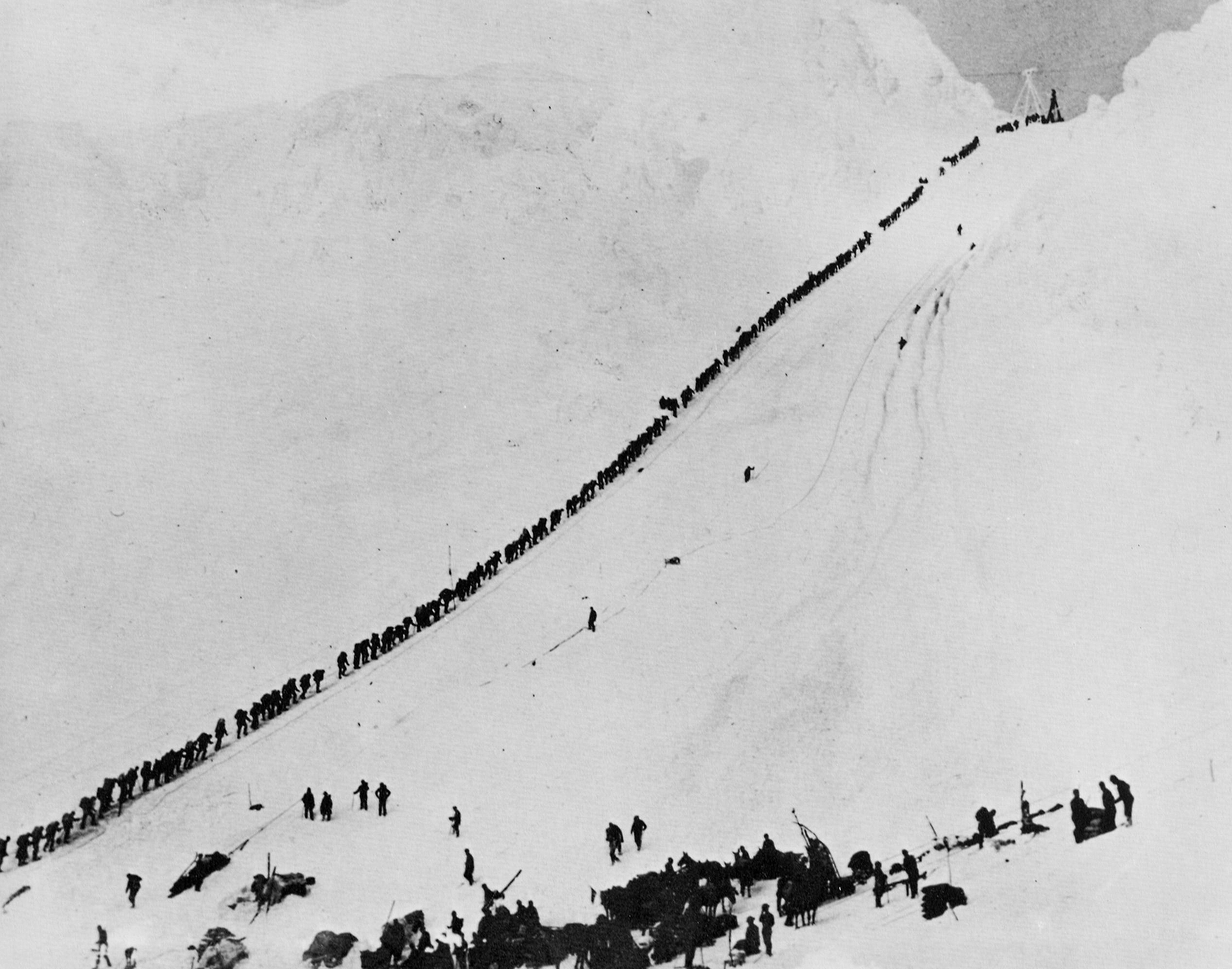
Miners and prospectors ascend the Chilkoot Trail during the Klondike Gold Rush.

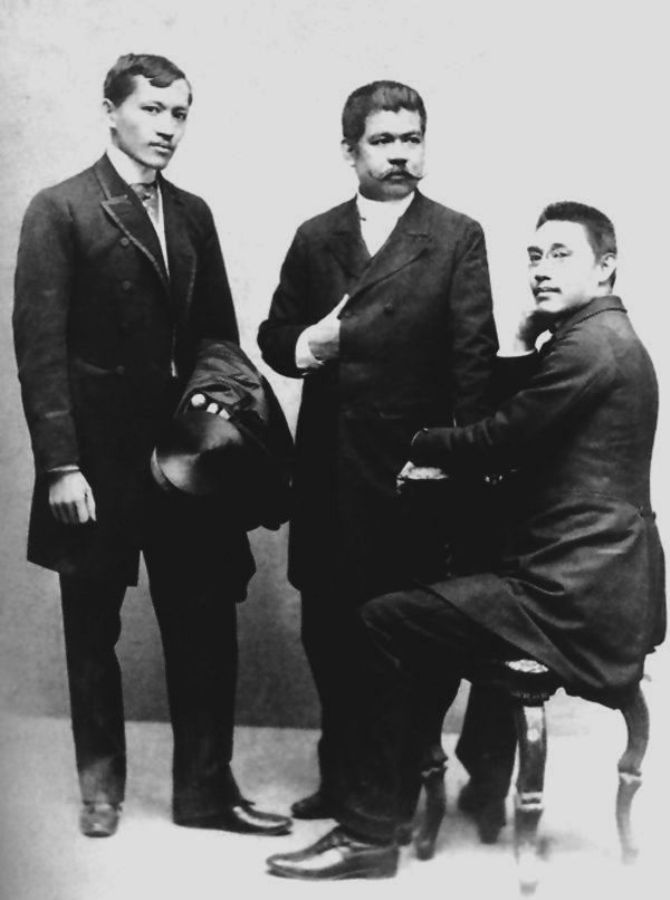
Studio portrait of Ilustrados in Europe, c. 1890

== 1890s ==
=== 1890 ===
- 1890s: Bike boom sweeps Europe and America.
- The Wounded Knee Massacre in South Dakota was the last battle in the American Indian Wars. This event represents the end of the American Old West.
- Italy annexes Eritrea.
- First use of the electric chair as a method for execution.
- Death of Vincent van Gogh.
- The cardboard box is invented.
- Kaiser Wilhelm II dismisses Germany's longtime chancellor Otto von Bismarck, thereafter embarking on the foreign policy of Weltpolitik, as opposed to Bismarck's Realpolitik.
- Gottlieb Daimler founds his manufacturing company in Germany, ancestor of Mercedes-Benz.

=== 1891 ===
- Mirza Ghulam Ahmad, founder of the Ahmadiyya movement, claims to be Promised Messiah and Imam Mahdi.
- 1891 Chilean Civil War.
- Pope Leo XIII issues the encyclical Rerum Novarum, the first major Catholic document on social justice.

=== 1892 ===
- Basketball is invented.
- The World's Columbian Exposition was held in Chicago celebrating the 400th anniversary of Christopher Columbus's arrival in the New World.
- Fingerprinting is officially adopted for the first time.
- Tchaikovsky's Nutcracker Suite premières in St Petersburg.
- John Froelich develops and constructs the first gasoline/petrol-powered tractor.

=== 1893 ===
- Business coalition overthrows the royal government of the Hawaiian Kingdom.
- The Internal Macedonian Revolutionary Organisation is formed.
- New Zealand becomes the first country to enact women's suffrage.
- The Coremans-de Vriendt law is passed in Belgium, creating legal equality for French and Dutch languages.

=== 1894 ===
- 1894–1895: After the First Sino-Japanese War, China cedes Taiwan to Japan and grants Japan a free hand in Korea.
- 1894–1897: Hundreds of thousands of Armenian and Assyrian Christians die in the Hamidian massacres in the Ottoman Empire.
- 1894–1906: Dreyfuss Affair shows intense antisemitism in France.
- First commercial film release by Jean Aimé Le Roy.
- First gramophone record.
- Karl Elsener invents the Swiss Army knife.
- France and the Russian Empire form a military alliance.
- Lombok War The Dutch looted and destroyed the Cakranegara palace of Mataram. J. L. A. Brandes, a Dutch philologist discovered and secured Nagarakretagama manuscript in Lombok royal library.

=== 1895 ===
- 1895–1896: Abyssinia defeats Italy in the First Italo–Ethiopian War.
- 1895–1898: Cuban War for Independence results in Cuban independence from Spain.
- Taiwan is ceded to the Empire of Japan as a result of the First Sino-Japanese War.
- Volleyball is invented.
- Trial of Oscar Wilde and premiere of his play The Importance of Being Earnest.
- French troops capture Antananarivo in Madagascar.
- Wilhelm Röntgen identifies x-rays.

=== 1896 ===
- Olympic Games revived in Athens.
- Ethiopia defeated Italy at the Battle of Adwa.
- Klondike Gold Rush in Canada.
- Henri Becquerel and Marie Curie discover radioactivity; J. J. Thomson identifies the electron, though not by name.

=== 1897 ===
- Gojong, or Emperor Gwangmu, proclaims the short-lived Korean Empire: lasts until 1910.
- Benin Expedition of 1897 loots and burns Benin.
- Greco-Turkish War.
- Bram Stoker writes Dracula.
- First electric bicycle produced by Hosea Libbey.
- Panic of 1893 ends in United States; prosperity restored.
- The term graveyard shift was first documented

=== 1898 ===
- 1898–1900: Zeppelin LZ 1 airship first produced.
- 1898–1900: The Boxer Rebellion in China
- 1898–1902: The Thousand Days' War in Colombia breaks out between the "Liberales" and "Conservadores", culminating with the loss of Panama in 1903.
- May 1: Commodore George Dewey sinks Spanish fleet near Manila.
- United States annexes the Republic of Hawaii
- June 12: Philippine Independence from Spain is declared by Filipino revolutionaries, led by Pres. Emilio Aguinaldo, in Kawit, Cavite.
- The United States gains control of Cuba, Puerto Rico, and the Philippines after the Spanish–American War.
- Empress Dowager Cixi of China engineers a coup d'état, marking the end of the Hundred Days' Reform; the Guangxu Emperor is arrested.
- H. G. Wells publishes The War of the Worlds.
- Empress Elisabeth of Austria is assassinated by anarchist Luigi Lucheni.
- General van Heutz becomes chief of staff of Aceh campaign. Wilhelmina becomes queen of the Netherlands.
- Herbert Kitchener, 1st Earl Kitchener defeats Mahdist Sudan in the Battle of Omdurman.

=== 1899 ===
- 1899–1902: Second Boer War begins; British victory.
- 1899–1900: Indian famine kills over 1 million people.
- 1899: Hague Convention of 1899 formulated the laws of war and outlaws war crimes.
- 1899–1900: Open Door Policy proclaimed to protect China.
- Giovanni Agnelli founds Fiat in Italy.
- Louis Renault and his brothers found their manufacturing company in France.

== 1900 ==
- Hawaii becomes an official U.S. territory.
- Galveston Hurricane in Texas kills 8000 people.
- L. Frank Baum publishes The Wonderful Wizard of Oz.
- King Umberto I of Italy is assassinated.
- Exposition Universelle held in Paris, prominently featuring the growing art trend Art Nouveau.
- First section of the Paris Metro opens.
- Eight nations invade China at the same time and suppress the Boxer Rebellion
