= Suikerwet =

States General of the Netherlands
- Territorial extent: Netherlands, Dutch East Indies
- Enacted by: States General of the Netherlands
- Enacted: 21 July 1870
- Status: Unknown

The Dutch Suikerwet of 1870 (sugar law of 1870) regulated part of the shift from the cultivation system to private enterprise in the Dutch East Indies.

== The cultivation system ==
=== The first 25 years of the cultivation system ===
The sugar industry on Java had developed in the 17th century. It produced sugar for markets in China, India, and the Persian Gulf. Its raw sugar was only rarely sent to Europe, where it could not compete with sugar from the Americas. By the end of the 1820s annual production on Java was estimated to be about 7,000 t.

After the Java War (1825–1830), the colonial government implemented the cultivation system in the parts of Java where it had direct sovereignty, which by then was most of the island. The idea behind the system was that instead of paying land taxes, the Java peasants / serfs would be forced to grow cash crops. The principal products of the system were: sugar, tobacco and tea.

The main characteristics of the cultivation system were that the government organized the production of sugar cane, which it sold to sugar manufacturers. In turn the sugar manufacturers were obliged to sell most of their raw sugar back to the government at fixed prices. The dealings between the government and the manufacturer were regulated by the sugar contracts.

Apart from the cultivation system, sugar manufacturers could process sugar cane on the particuliere landerijen, private manorial property of mostly Chinese and Dutch lords; or on uncultivated lands hired from the government. Another option was to hire villages in the autonomous states of Yogyakarta or Surakarta, which gave the manufacturer, the use of the fields and labor of the villagers.

In 25 years, the sugar culture on Java developed from a rather backward business to an industry that competed on the world market. Production in piculs (60.5 kg) per bahu (0.71 hectare) rose almost threefold, and cane mills driven by buffalo were replaced by steam driven sugarcane mills. By 1855 the yearly production of raw sugar under the cultivation system was about 1,500,000 piculs or 90,750 t.

The profits of the cultivation system were huge. Most of these ended up in the Dutch state treasury. A smaller part was used to subsidize shipbuilding and industry in the Netherlands. The Netherlands Trading Society paid inflated prices to ship products to the Netherlands on board Dutch ships. The government itself levied lower taxes if raw sugar was exported to the Netherlands. The former helped the Dutch shipbuilding industry to recover. The latter aided the recovery of the once famous Dutch sugar refining industry, which had previously relied on raw sugar from the Caribbean.

=== Criticism ===
The cultivation system was initially very successful from the perspective of the Dutch government and Dutch economy. It was initially even successful for the local population, as this doubled from 6 to 12 million in 25 years. However, in about 1850 the system came under severe criticism. Dutchmen on Java who were not related to the public service saw themselves excluded from the profits that the system generated. Liberals in the Netherlands harbored the same sentiment. The liberals also gave scientific reasons to abolish the system, proving that it stifled innovation, and prevented the East Indies economy from achieving its full potential. The defenders of the system claimed that it defended the local population from exploitation by capitalists.

In December 1852 the liberal W. R. van Hoëvell, a famous critic of the colonial system explained some of the problems of the sugar contracts, which ruled the interaction between the government and the raw sugar manufacturers. In recent years, the mandatory sale of 1/3 or 2/3 of the manufacturer's raw sugar to the government at fixed prices had been very profitable for the manufacturers, but had cost millions to the government. The sugar contracts were not tendered, but were given to those who were friendly to the government. Apart from being unequitable, this caused further losses to the East Indies government, because competition would have led to more beneficial contracts. All of this stifled the flow of industrial investments to the East Indies. Hoëvell demanded that the government should leave the trade in raw sugar. I.e. the government should no longer buy raw sugar, but give the sugar manufacturers freedom to sell their product wherever they wanted.

== The Suikerwet ==
=== Content ===
The Suikerwet was worded as a change to article 66 of the Reglement op het beleid der regering van Nederlandsch-Indië (statute for the government of the Dutch East Indies). The new article determined that:

- The authorities would not promote additional forced sugar cultivation.
- The existing forced sugar cultivation would be scaled down starting in 1879 so as to disappear in 1890.
- The existing forced sugar cultivation would not exceed 20% of the grounds of a village, unless the village itself requested this. There should be proper payment for the use of the village grounds and labor. The government's involvement in planting should be replaced by that of the manufacturer as soon as possible. The manufacturer should not use water meant for the village agriculture, etc.
- The Governor-general of the Dutch East Indies would ensure that useful companies would not be restricted or continue to be restricted.

The changes were implemented by orders to the governor-general. He had to promote that the payment for labor would actually be received by the laborers doing the work, so as to facilitate the transfer to a free labor economy. Regulation of the consumption of water for sugar manufacturing was also part of the law. For the sugar manufacturer, it would become possible to become the owner of the grounds of their sugar mill, instead of only getting a lease on the grounds. The existing contracts would be bound to the mill.

The Agrarische Wet, which was also introduced in 1870, had the same goals as the Suikerwet. It aimed to regulate rural landownership on Java.

=== Effectiveness ===
The Suikerwet led to the disengagement of the East Indies government from the production of sugar and to a free market for sugar producers. These were major objectives that the Dutch liberals achieved with the Suikerwet.

The objective to switch the Java economy from communalism to private landownership and free labor was not achieved. The village elites were so powerful that the small landholder still did not get a realistic price for the land that he rented out to the factories. Many small landholders were also indebted to bigger landowners, or to the sugar factories, which both had an interest in indebting him. It all led to multiple investigations and measures that aimed to redeem this situation.
