= GTU =

GTU may refer to:

== Education ==
- Gebze Technical University, in Turkey
- Georgian Technical University, in Georgia
- Graduate Theological Union, a consortium of independent California theological education institutions
- Gujarat Technological University, in Gujarat, India

== Other uses ==
- Aghu Tharrnggala language (ISO 639:gtu)
- Gamma Theta Upsilon, an honour society in geography
- General Trades Union, a defunct American trade union
- Georgetown Municipal Airport
- Grand Touring Under, a class in the IMSA GT Championship
  - Chevrolet Beretta GTU
