= Ely Moore =

American politician (1798–1860)

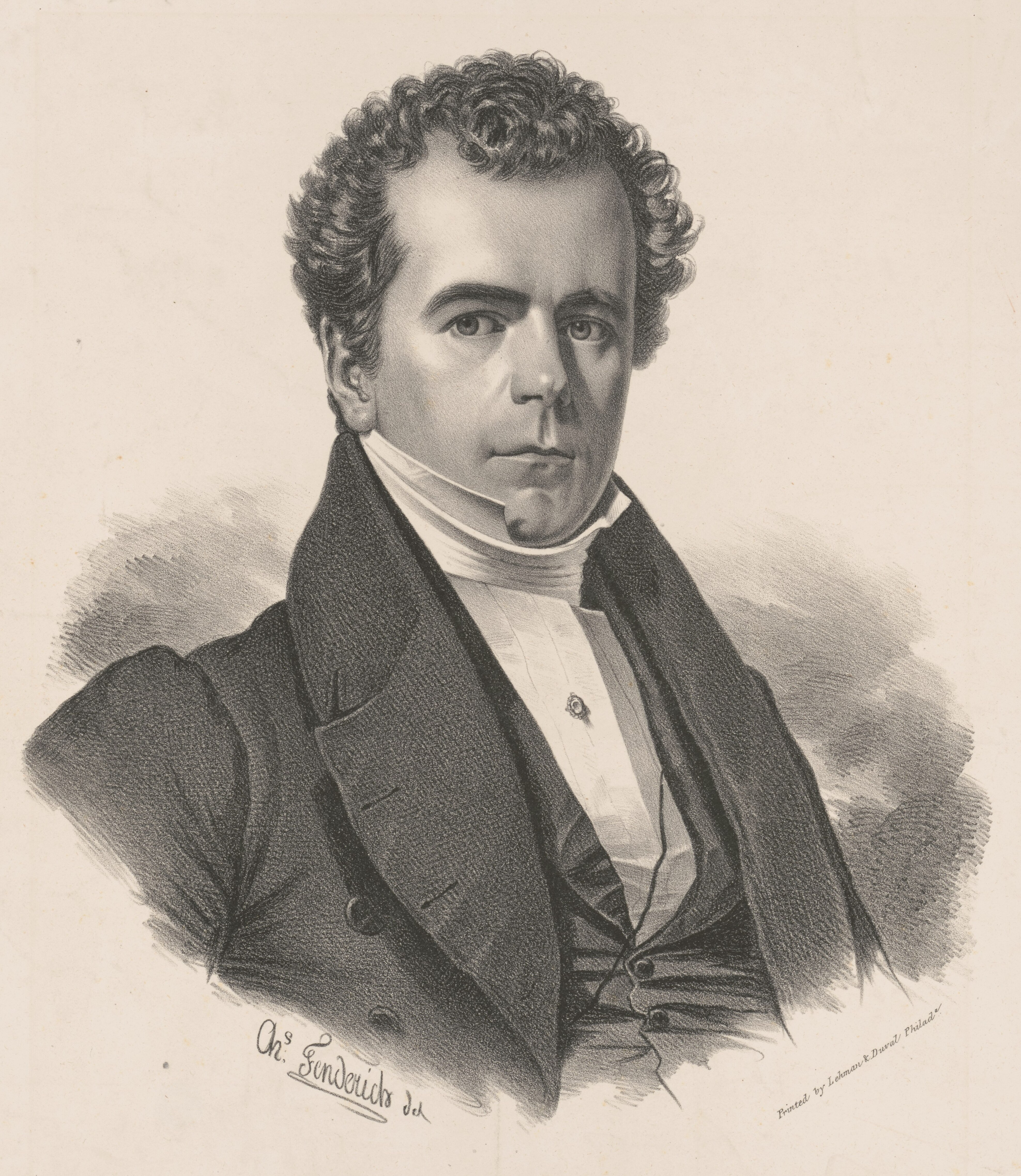
- 1837 lithograph

1st President of the National Trades Union
- In office August 26, 1834 – August 26, 1835
- Preceded by: Office established
- Succeeded by: John Commerford

1st President of the General Trades Union
- In office August 14, 1833 – August 14, 1835
- Preceded by: Office established
- Succeeded by: John Commerford

Member of the U.S. House of Representatives from New York's 3rd district
- In office March 4, 1835 – March 3, 1839
- Preceded by: John J. Morgan
- Succeeded by: James Monroe

Surveyor of the Port of New York
- In office March 3, 1839 – May 3, 1845
- Appointed by: Martin Van Buren
- Collector: Jesse Hoyt; John J. Morgan; Edward Curtis; Cornelius P. Van Ness
- Preceded by: Hector Craig
- Succeeded by: Elijah F. Purdy

United States Marshal for the Southern District of New York
- In office May 3, 1845 – May 16, 1850
- Appointed by: James K. Polk
- Preceded by: Silas M. Stilwell
- Succeeded by: Henry F. Tallmadge

Personal details
- Born: July 4, 1798 Belvidere, New Jersey, U.S.
- Died: January 27, 1860 (aged 61) Lecompton, Kansas, U.S.
- Party: Democratic; Jacksonian
- Spouse(s): Emma Coutant (m. 1824; died 1846) Clara Baker (m. 1847)
- Children: 6

Ely Moore (July 4, 1798 – January 27, 1860) was an American newspaperman and labor leader who served two terms as a Jacksonian U.S. Representative from New York from 1835 to 1839. He was dubbed "labor's first congressman."

== Biography ==
Moore was born near Belvidere, New Jersey. He attended public schools, and then moved to New York and studied medicine. He became a printer and an editor of a New York City labor paper. Arthur M. Schlesinger Jr. characterized him as:

A sallow, restless man, with keen, nervous eyes and long black hair brushed back from his forehead, well dressed, often carrying a heavy ivory-headed cane, he enjoyed a tremendous reputation for eloquence.

=== Union leader ===
Moore headed and established the General Trades Union of New York. The GTU was the first Union containing multiple trades. He then was elected the first president of New York City’s Federation of Craft Unions in 1833. In 1834 he became the first President of the National Trades’ Union. The NTU spanned from Boston to St. Louis. The NTU helped to establish the 10 hour work day in many states. New York had already established the 10 hour work day.

In 1836, Moore performed one of his last speeches. It was a stunning defense of Workers, Unions, and the Free Labor System. His stunning oration was in reply to an insulting speech by Waddy Thompson, Jr. of South Carolina that called northern laborers "thieves who would raise wages through insurrection or by the equally terrible process of the ballot-box." Moore's speech contained stirring aggravation at the unjust moneyed aristocracy, Nicholas Biddle (second US Bank), and the lack of equality of the wage earning worker. During his most heated rhetoric he collapsed onto the podium.

=== Political career ===
Moore's first interest in national politics was to endorse Richard Mentor Johnson, on March 13, 1833, for Vice President, because he opposed the Sabbatarian Movement (contrary to the freedom of religion), and supported replacing imprisonment for debt with a bankruptcy law.

Moore was a Tammany Hall candidate for Congress in 1834 and 1836; in the latter year, he and Churchill C. Cambreleng, the other successful Tammany candidate, were also supported by the Locofocos. In his first speech to Congress, delivered in 1836, Moore defended trade unions as follows:

Sir, these associations are intended as counterpoises against capital, whenever it should attempt to exert an unlawful or undue influence. They are a measure of self-defense and self-preservation, and, therefore, are not illegal!

Moore was defeated in 1838; his district, which returned four Congressmen, went largely Whig. Shortly after, President Martin Van Buren appointed him Surveyor of the Port of New York, where he served from 1839 to 1845. Moore supported Van Buren for re-election in 1840, although he lost to William Henry Harrison. Moore was one of the radical leaders to support the Dorr Rebellion in Rhode Island in 1842.

Moore was one of the radicals who criticized the early abolitionists in the interest of labor, seeing a Whig plot to introduce the Negro as cheap competition in the labor market, and keep wages low.

Moore was appointed by President James K. Polk United States marshal for the southern district of New York in 1845, serving until 1850. He became owner and editor of the Warren Journal of his hometown, Belvidere, New Jersey. He was appointed agent for the Miami and other tribes of Indians in the Kansas Territory in 1853. He was appointed register of the United States land office in Lecompton, Kansas, in 1855 and served until 1860.

=== Death and family ===
Moore died in Lecompton, Douglas County, Kansas, on January 27, 1860, at the age of 61 and is interred on his farm near Lecompton.

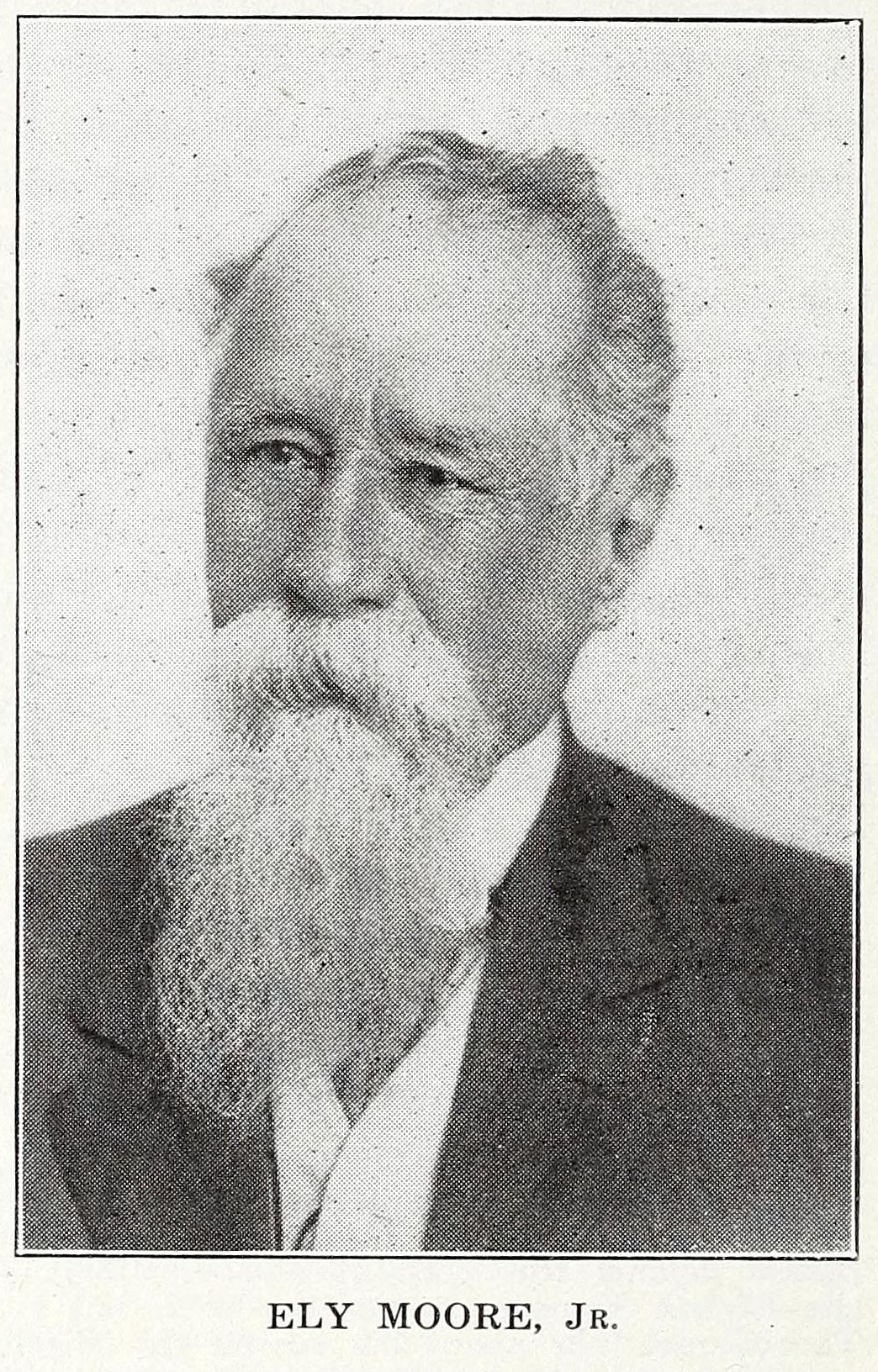
Ely Moore Jr. c. 1911

Moore married Emma Coutant, the daughter of a wealthy merchant, in 1824. They had six children. After Emma's death in 1846, Moore remarried Clara Baker (née Vandewater), a widow, in 1847.

Moore's son Ely Jr. worked alongside his father at the Indian Bureau in the Kansas Territory, during which he encountered and feuded with abolitionist John Brown.

== Speeches and works ==
- Reply to a pamphlet entitled "A statement of facts in relation to the origin progress and prospects of the New-York and Harlem Rail Road Company." (February 21, 1833)
- "Address to the General Trades' Union" (December 2, 1833)
- "The Laboring Classes" (May 5, 1836)
- "On presenting a remonstrance from citizens of the District of Columbia against the reception of abolition petitions, &c" (February 4, 1839)
- "Proceedings of a meeting in favor of municipal reform held at Tammany Hall" (March 22, 1844)

== Sources ==
- United States Congress. "Ely Moore (id: M000897)". Biographical Directory of the United States Congress.
- Sean Wilentz. The Rise of American Democracy. W.W. Norton. New York and London. 2005.
- Arthur M. Schlesinger, Jr., The Age of Jackson, Little Brown, 1945.
- Joshua R. Greenberg. Advocating the Man: Masculinity, Organized Labor, and the Household in New York, 1800–1840, Columbia University Press. New York. 2009.

U.S. House of Representatives
Preceded by Churchill C. Cambreleng; Campbell P. White; John J. Morgan; Charles G. Ferris	Member of the U.S. House of Representatives from New York's 3rd congressional district 1835–1839 with Churchill C. Cambreleng (1835–39), Campbell P. White (1835), John McKeon (1835–37), Gideon Lee (1835–37), Edward Curtis (1837–39), Ogden Hoffman (1837–39)	Succeeded by Moses H. Grinnell; Edward Curtis; James Monroe; Ogden Hoffman
