= National Trades' Union =

The National Trades' Union (NTU) was the first federation of labor unions in the United States. It was established in 1834, but collapsed during the Panic of 1837.

== History ==
The National Trades' Union was not only the first American society vying for uniform wage standards, it was also the first union to operate on a federal scale. By 1836, 300,000 workers were members of the union. Under the federation, by 1836 around fifty unions had formed in Philadelphia, New York, Baltimore, Boston, Albany, Schenectady, Troy, Washington, D.C., Newark, New Brunswick, New Jersey, Cincinnati, Pittsburgh, Louisville, and elsewhere. While some organized national unions within their crafts, most participated in citywide "trades' unions," which established the short-lived National Trades' Union in 1834 under the leadership of first Ely Moore then John Commerford.

The NTU's focuses included uniform wages, 10-hour work days, as well as legislation that would benefit workers. This included a push for the establishment of public libraries and reforms in areas of education and labor. The National Trades' Union also influenced The Workingman's Party, the first political party focused on labor.

The NTU collapsed with most of its constituent bodies during the Panic of 1837.
