= General Trades Union =

The General Trades' Union was formed in New York City in 1833 with the purpose of uniting all of the trade societies of New York. The goal of this central union was to better coordinate the various trade unions in the New York City area, to provide assistance during conflicts with employers, and to maintain a fund for striking laborers. The GTU formed the National Trades Union, the first attempt at a nationwide union movement. The GTU of New York organised one the first strikes in the United States and initiated the system now known as collective bargaining.

== History ==
The first large trade union, the General Trades' Union (GTU), was organized in New York City on 14 August 1833 by delegates from nine craft trades. It celebrated with a public parade displaying its new emblem, a banner bearing a likeness of Archimedes lifting a mountain with a lever. Ely Moore, a journeyman printer, was elected its first president. He left soon after, and with the backing of the newly formed National Trades’ Union won a seat in Congress as a Democrat. Later he helped generate Congressional support for the 10-hour workday.

John Commerford, a cabinet and chair maker, replaced Moore, and asserted that skilled artisans were only seen as commodities by their employers. Commerford did not have the benefit of experience, and thus much of what he accomplished was ad hoc. Commerford stressed education as necessary for empowering workers. True reform would come when workers knew the value of their own worth and the truth about the economic and political system. Commerford later ran for Congress on several third party tickets.

The Union was affiliated with the Locofocos, who were against the Second Bank of the United States, but refrained from political activity so as to avoid the kind of demise suffered by the Working Men's Party in 1829–30. They staged over 40 strikes and by 1836 had a membership including 66% of New York City's Journeyman labourers.

The GTU spread across many cities along the eastern seaboard, including Baltimore, Boston, Cincinnati, Newark, Philadelphia, and Washington, D.C. By 1835 a network of trade unions developed in New York City and Philadelphia. One year later the number of unions in the network had grown to 13, with 52 local societies in New York, 53 in Philadelphia, 23 in Baltimore, and 16 in Boston.

The labor movement of the 1830s was wiped out by the financial panic of 1837. An even larger labor movement in the 1860s collapsed in the Depression of 1873. It was only in the 1880s that a labor movement was established for good.

== Philadelphia, Pennsylvania ==
The GTU of the City and County of Philadelphia was formed in 1834.

== See also ==
- Mechanics' Union of Trade Associations
- Working Men's Party
