= Cultivation System =

Dutch government policy for its Dutch East Indies colony

The Cultivation System (Dutch: cultuurstelsel) was a system of forced labor used to grow cash crops to pay taxes and for export. It was Dutch government policy from 1830 until 1870 in its Dutch East Indies colony (now Indonesia), requiring a portion of agricultural production to be devoted to export crops. It is referred to by Indonesian historians as tanam paksa ("enforced planting").

The policy brought the Dutch enormous wealth through export growth, averaging around 14%. It brought the Netherlands back from the brink of bankruptcy and made the Dutch East Indies self-sufficient and profitable extremely quickly. As early as 1831, the policy allowed the Dutch East Indies budget to be balanced, using the surplus revenue to pay off debts from the defunct VOC regime. The cultivation system is linked to famines and epidemics in the 1840s, firstly in Cirebon and then Central Java, as cash crops such as indigo and sugar had to be grown instead of rice.

== Background ==
By the late 18th century, the business model of the old Dutch East India Company, reliant on monopolies and market domination, led to the company's ruin. By 1805, the Dutch part of Java produced a revenue of only 2.5 million Java Rupees. The government of Herman Willem Daendels from 1808 to 1811 raised this to 3.5 million just before the English conquest. During the British occupation of Java, revenue rose to 7.5 million Rupees for Java and its dependencies in 1815. Another 2 million were contributed by the native lands. Most of this income was raised by a land tax. However, the land tax system soon failed, because in the long run, the tenants were unable to pay the amounts required.

From the late 1820s, the East Indies government then came under increased financial pressure. This started with Dutch involvement in the Padri Wars (1821–1837), followed by the costly Java War (1825 to 1830). The Belgian Revolution of 1830 brought the finances of the Netherlands itself into trouble. The costs of keeping the Dutch army at a war footing until 1839, turned this into a financial crisis, almost causing state bankruptcy.

In 1830, a new governor general, Johannes van den Bosch, was appointed to increase the exploitation of the Dutch East Indies' resources. The Cultivation System was implemented only on land directly controlled by the colonial government, exempting the Vorstenlanden (princely states) and the particuliere landerijen (private domains).

== Implementation ==
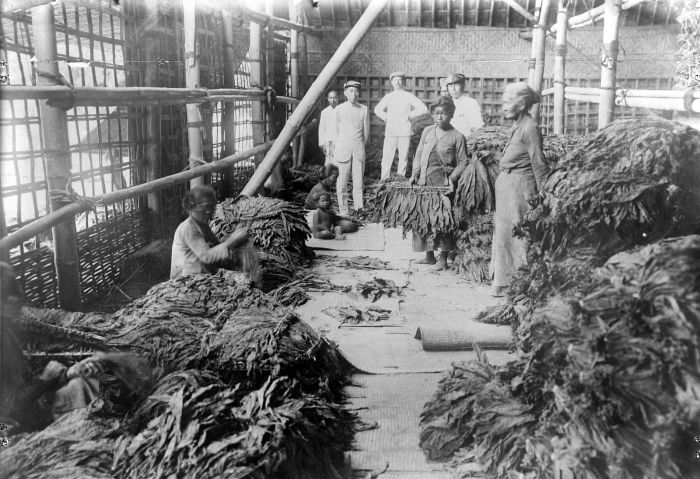
Sorting tobacco leaves in Java during colonial period, in/before 1939.

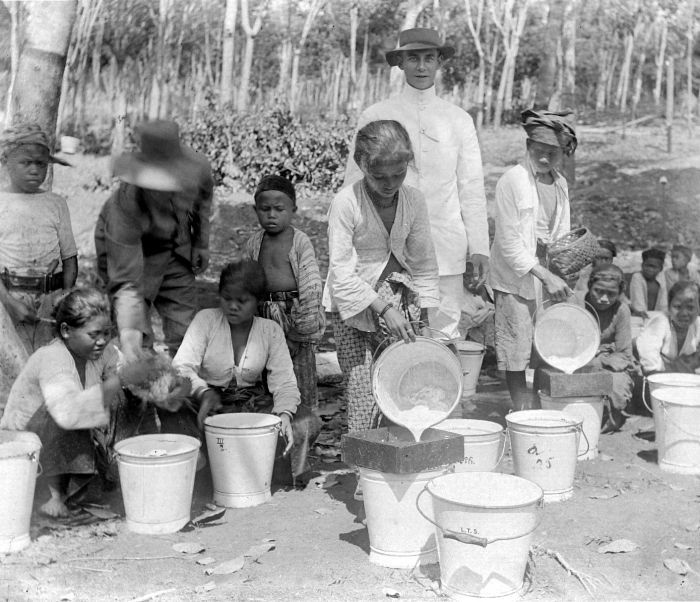
Collecting natural rubbers in plantation in Java. Rubber tree was introduced by the Dutch from South America.

The cultivation system was primarily implemented in Java, the center of the colonial state. Instead of land taxes, 20% of village land had to be devoted to government export crops; alternatively, peasants had to work in government-owned plantations for 66 days of the year. To enforce these policies, Javanese villagers were more formally linked to their villages, sometimes requiring permission to freely travel around the island without permission. This policy turned much of Java into a Dutch plantation. Up to 1 million farmers were forced to work under this system at its peak. While local farmers officially only had to dedicate 20% of their farmland to cash crop production, in reality they were forced to dedicate significantly more than the originally ordained 20% of their farmland to the cultivation of cash crops, leaving little farmland for local food production.

To handle and process the cash crops, the Dutch set up a network of local middlemen who profited greatly and so had a vested interest in the system: compradors, similar to the cottier system in Ireland. The network was financed by bonds sold to the Dutch and new copper coinage at about a 2:1 ratio to the old, gaining massive seigniorage from the depreciation at the expense of the local economy. These middlemen received so-called cultivation percentages by the colonial government. The greater the revenues their territories generated for the Netherlands, the larger the payments they received. In addition, the high land rents and compulsory labor services imposed by the colonial state were widely abused by the colonial government, and numerous corrupt European officials.

'An ingenious device for increasing the Government profit was devised by General Van-der Bosch at the same time as he initiated the culture system. An enormous amount of copper coinage was manufactured in Holland, the intrinsic value being rather less than half the nominal value. This coinage was made a legal tender, and the cultivator was paid for his produce in this copper coin. Thus, as Mr. Money in his work Java; or, How to Manage a Colony, naively remarks:- "The loans, raised in Holland to start the system, produced an effect in Java equal to double their amount."'

== Effects ==
The policy meant considerable profit for the Dutch state through the export of colonial goods. At its peak the cultivation system accounted for 50% of Dutch state revenue. It brought the Netherlands back from the brink of bankruptcy and within a short timeframe made the Dutch East Indies a completely self-sufficient and highly profitable colony. As early as 1831, the policy allowed the Dutch East Indies budget to be balanced, using the surplus revenue to pay off debts from the defunct VOC regime.

The Cultivation System resulted in widespread famines and epidemics in the 1840s, firstly in Cirebon and then Central Java, as cash crops such as indigo and sugar had to be grown instead of rice. According to recent research the mortality rate rose by as much as 30% during this period. Several tens of thousands perished due to starvation and disease. Local resistance to the system was widespread but proved ineffective due to violent intervention by the colonial state; protesters faced harsh prison sentences or corporal punishment.

Political pressures in the Netherlands resulting from the problems and rent seeking independent merchants preferring free trade or local preference eventually led to the system's abolition. Legal milestones to achieve this were the Suikerwet and the Agrarische Wet, both introduced in 1870. This was the start of the free-market Liberal Period in which private enterprise was encouraged. According to a recent study the mortality rate in Java would have been 20% higher during the 1870s had the Cultivation System not been abolished in 1870.

While the end of the Cultivation System mitigated the most extreme excesses local forced labor still persisted until the end of the colonial period. Prisoners and conscripted laborers were deployed under appalling conditions to build railways, bridges, and irrigation systems. Sentences of forced labor served as a convenient replacement for previously implemented corporal punishment.

== See also ==
- Landrentestelsel
- Max Havelaar

== Sources ==
- Boys, Henry Scott (1892). Some Notes on Java and its Administration by the Dutch. Allahabad: Pioneer Press. OL 24154014M.
- Goh, Taro (1998). Communal Land Tenure in Nineteenth-century Java: The Formation of Western Images of the Eastern Village Community. Department of Anthropology, Research School of Pacific and Asian Studies, Australian National University. ISBN 978-0-7315-3200-1.
- Money, J.W.B. (1861), Java: Or, How to Manage a Colony, vol. I, Hurst and Blackett, London
- Van Schendel, Willem (2016). Embedding Agricultural Commodities: Using Historical Evidence, 1840s–1940s, edited by Willem van Schendel, from google (cultivation system java famine) result 10. Routledge. ISBN 9781317144977.
- Witton, Patrick (2003). Indonesia. Melbourne: Lonely Planet. pp. 23–24. ISBN 1-74059-154-2.
