= Liberal Period (Dutch East Indies) =

The Liberal Period refers to the economic policies instituted in the Dutch East Indies from the mid-19th century.

== Background: the cultivation system ==
Under the cultivation system (or "tanam paksa" in Indonesian) in place for most of the 19th century, the Dutch colonial government in the Indonesian archipelago required indigenous farmers to deliver, as a sort of tax, fixed amounts of specified crops, such as sugar or coffee. Much of Java became a Dutch plantation, making it a profitable, self-sufficient colony and saving the Netherlands from bankruptcy and helping it become a thriving and modernised bourgeois society. The Cultivation System, however, brought much economic hardship to Javanese peasants, who suffered famine and epidemics in the 1840s, attracting much critical public opinion in the Netherlands.

== De-regulation of the Indies economy ==
Prior to the late 19th century recession, the Liberal Party had been dominant in policy making in the Netherlands. Its free market philosophy found its way to the Indies where the cultivation system was de-regulated. Under agrarian reforms from 1870, producers were no longer compelled to provide crops for exports, but the Indies were open up to private enterprise. Dutch businessmen set up large, profitable plantations. Sugar production doubled between 1870 and 1885; new crops such as tea and cinchona flourished, and rubber was introduced, leading to dramatic increases in Dutch profits.

Changes were not limited to Java, or agriculture; oil from Sumatra and Kalimantan became a valuable resource for industrialising Europe. Frontier plantations of tobacco and rubber saw the destruction of jungle in the Outer Islands. Dutch commercial interests expanded off Java to the outer islands with increasingly more territory coming under direct Dutch government control or dominance in the latter half of the 19th century. Tens of thousands of laborers from China, India, and Java were brought to the Outer Islands to work the plantations where they suffered cruel treatment and a high death rate as "coolies".

Liberals said the benefits of economic expansion would trickle down to the local level. However, the resulting scarcity of land for rice production, combined with dramatically increasing populations, especially in Java, led to further hardships. The world wide recession of the late 1880s and early 1890s saw the commodity prices on which the Indies depended collapsed. Journalists and civil servants observed that the majority of the Indies population were no better off than under the previous regulated Cultivation System economy and tens of thousands starved. Some unconfirmed sources also state as that mostly rich Non-indigenous people (such as European and Chinese) and rich Indigenous Nobles who profitted under this system yet leaving the non-wealthy indigenous people unable to gather capitals and their standard of living not any different than Java War.

== The ethical policy ==
Concern over the welfare of indigenous populations in the Indies resulted in Queen Wilhelmina proclaiming in 1901 a new, benevolent "Ethical Policy", intended to bring progress, prosperity and improved education to the natives.

== See also ==
- History of Indonesia
