= Venkatachalapathi Samuldrala prayer controversy =

American controversy

This controversy centers on the first Hindu opening prayer offered in the United States House of Representatives by Venkatachalapathi Samuldrala, a priest of Shiva Hindu Temple in Parma, Ohio. This prompted criticism from the Family Research Council, a conservative Christian group, who protested against it in conservative media, in turn generating responses from their opponents and leading to serious discussions over the role of legislative chaplains in a pluralist society.

Hindu priests have on occasion given opening prayers in Congress since then. A 2007 Senate opening prayer led by Rajan Zed of Reno, Nevada, was criticized in advance by the American Family Association, and protesters interrupted the prayer from the Senate gallery.

== Prayer ==
Under the rules of the United States House of Representatives, a member can invite a guest chaplain once per term in Congress. Representative Sherrod Brown of Ohio invited Samuldrala to offer the opening prayer on September 14, 2000, to coincide with an address to a joint session of Congress by the Prime Minister of India Atal Bihari Vajpayee.

Samuldrala opened the House's day with the following prayer:

O God, You are Omnipresent, Omnipotent, and Omniscient. You are in everything and nothing is beyond You. You are our Mother and Father and we are all Your children. Whatever You do is for our good. You are the ocean of mercy and You forgive our errors. You are our teacher and You guide us into righteousness.

Today, in this great Hall, are assembled the elected Representatives of the people of the Nation. They are ready to perform their duties. God, please guide them in their thoughts and actions so they can achieve the greatest good of all.

We end this invocation with a prayer from the ancient scriptures of India:

May all be happy
May all be free from disease
May all realize what is good
May none be subject to misery
Peace, peace, peace be unto all

== Rep. Brown's comments ==
After the prayer, Rep. Brown made the following statement:

Today is a great day for Indian-American relations. For the first time, a Hindu priest has given the opening prayer at a session of Congress, and the Prime Minister of India [Atal Bihari Vajpayee] later this morning will address a joint session of Congress... The United States is also home to an Indian-American community of 1.4 million people. I requested the House Chaplain and Speaker to invite Mr. Samuldrala to give today's prayer as a testimony to the religious diversity that is the hallmark of our great nation.

I want to thank Mr. Samuldrala for his thoughtful prayer that reminds us that, while we may differ in culture and traditions, we are all alike in the most basic aspiration of peace and righteousness.

I thank the House Chaplain for inviting Mr. Samuldrala and look forward to the future efforts to strengthen the bonds between our two great nations.

== Family Research Council response ==
On September 21, 2000 the Family Research Council (FRC) published a response to the prayer on their website and in mailings of their weekly newsletter. In the FRC's article "Religious Pluralism or Tolerance?", Robert Regier and Timothy Dailey said:

A Hindu priest was recently invited to give the opening invocation in the House of Representatives. What's wrong with this?

What's wrong is that it is one more indication that our nation is drifting from its Judeo-Christian roots... Alas, in our day, when "tolerance" and "diversity" have replaced the 10 Commandments as the only remaining absolute dictums, it has become necessary to "celebrate" non-Christian religions – even in the halls of Congress... Our founders expected that Christianity – and no other religion – would receive support from the government as long as that support did not violate people's consciences and their right to worship. They would have found utterly incredible the idea that all religions, including paganism, be treated with equal deference. Many people today confuse traditional Western religious tolerance with religious pluralism. The former embraces biblical truth while allowing for freedom of conscience, while the latter assumes all religions are equally valid, resulting in moral relativism and ethical chaos...

And further stated:

As for our Hindu priest friend, the United States is a nation that has historically honored the One True God. Woe be to us on that day when we relegate Him to being merely one among countless other deities in the pantheon of theologies.

== Aftermath of the FRC response ==
In response to news media reporting the FRC's response, Rep. Brown's spokesperson said that it is "unfortunate that the Family Research Council interprets the Constitution to say that religious freedom means Christian supremacy". Brown personally responded to the FRC statement, saying "I'm disappointed the Family Research Council doesn't understand what this country is all about. This country was founded on freedom of religion and religious diversity." He said their comments were "bigotry, plain and simple".

Reverend Barry W. Lynn, executive director of Americans United for Separation of Church and State, said the FRC's statement "reeks of religious bigotry...[showing a] remarkable lack of respect for religious diversity". He also said, "It is truly rare, even within the Religious Right, to see a group display simultaneously such a poor understanding of history and a remarkable lack of respect for religious diversity. Usually such profound ignorance like this is commonly found in the 18th, not the 21st century."

After the FRC's comments were reported by the Associated Press, the original critical article was removed from the FRC website, and Kristin Hansen, an FRC spokesperson, told reporters that "the piece had not been approved by FRC officials and was published accidentally". Chuck Donovan, the Executive Vice President of the FRC, issued a press release on September 22, 2000, which said, "It is the position of the Family Research Council that governments must respect freedom of conscience for all people in religious matters ... We affirm the truth of Christianity, but it is not our position that American's [sic] Constitution forbids representatives of religions other than Christianity from praying before Congress." Donovan also decried secularization in the American culture, but pointed out his group's support for religious freedom legislation. Donovan also wrote against the persecution of Christians across the globe, calling on India to protect the Christian minority there just as the United States ensures the rights of the American Hindu minority.

== Timothy Lamer article ==
The issue continued to resonate among the Christian right, which led author, and managing editor of the Christian magazine World, Timothy Lamer to publish an essay on October 7, 2000, entitled "Spiritual adultery - A case of infidelity in the public square". He began it by stating that "the U.S. House and Senate basically bowed down to Baal". He went on to say "the event showcased everything that is wrong, from an evangelical perspective, with the congressional chaplaincy in particular and civil religion in general". He called for evangelicals "who have fought so hard for a resurgence of civil religion" to demand that legislators who attended the "officially sanctioned Hindu prayer in the halls of Congress" be "call[ed] to repentance and, if he doesn't repent, excommunicate him".

God's Word teaches that a Christian who bows down to a false god—or takes part in a prayer that denies Christ—is engaged in spiritual adultery, which is every bit as serious as physical adultery. Christ demands our exclusive spiritual allegiance, and the church must not tolerate violations of the first two commandments among its members.

Lamer postulated that "another response is appropriate: Perhaps Mr. Samuldrala's invocation will cause evangelicals to rethink their devotion to civil religion. As the United States increasingly becomes a gigantic Vanity Fair of false religions, it will become more difficult every year for Christians to see religion in the public square as a good thing."

Lamer held that a denial of what he saw as basic Christian doctrine among "nominal Christians in theologically liberal churches" had fully detached them from Christianity, thus making actual Christians a minority, but that this is no surprise in light of Matthew 7:13-14. With this in mind he stated:

Nor should we be surprised that an unchristian [sic] majority would reserve an honored place for untruth in its civil religion. A Hindu invocation is only an extreme version of this habit. Other forms of civil religion routinely are calculated to be inoffensive to those who deny Christ....Polite universalism is America's civil religion, and it is an absolute enemy of the gospel. It assumes that those who are not in Christ are on good terms with God—a lie, according to the Bible.

Lamer warned Christians that they should "Get ready for Mormons, Muslims, New Age shamans, and, with the rise of Wicca, even Wiccans leading congressmen in prayer on the floor of the House." He therefore called for a reconsideration in evangelical policy regarding their support of legislative chaplains:

We could recognize that under the new covenant, civil government doesn't have authority over spiritual matters, and that legislatures shouldn't have chaplains. (For centuries some evangelicals, such as Baptists, made this argument.) We also could recognize that civil religion, by affirming unbelievers in their unbelief, hinders the spread of the gospel. Or evangelicals could continue to fight for symbolic civil religion. But, increasingly, the result of their effort will be a golden calf in America's pluralistic public square. How will they react? If Mr. Samuldrala's invocation is any indication, they will silently bow and not make waves, for the sake of having religion—any religion, even soul-destroying religion—in the public square."

== Responses to Lamer's article ==
=== Neuhaus ===
Richard John Neuhaus pointed out that Lamer's position in World was in contrast to another article entitled "Genuine pluralism" in the same issue, by James Skillen of the Center for Public Justice, who held that "most Americans are not convinced that secularizing the public square is the way to do justice to diverse faiths", and that the government should "make room for all faiths—both religious and secular—without giving a privileged position to any of them....The United States is not a Jewish state or a Catholic state; not a Protestant state or Muslim state. And it certainly should not be a secularized state."

Neuhaus noted that "Skillen thinks the chaplaincy program in the military, government support for faith-based social services, and parental choice in education are indicative of the ways to go in a pluralistic society." He agreed with Skillen and maintained that:

Mr. Lamer is wrong, I think, to claim that bowing one's head in respect means that one is joining in a prayer to Hindu gods. Presumably Christian legislators, if they were praying, were praying to the God and Father of Jesus Christ....I would recast the World debate to argue that it is precisely because of the Judeo-Christian ethic that the public square should be hospitable to all faiths. Because, first, we do not sacralize the public square, mistaking it for the Church. And, second, because we recognize that all people, whatever their religious or other errors, are made in the image of God and therefore bearers of a human dignity that demands our respect. The Lamer-Skillen exchange usefully poses questions about which all Christians need greater clarity.

=== Marty ===
Among the voices responding to Lamer's article was Martin E. Marty who, while apparently disagreeing with much of Lamer's view, applauded him for calling for a more serious examination of the issue of civil religion, saying:

...he is struggling with a genuine issue, offering an alert to which observers of American religion should pay close attention. Lamer's editorial is a "distant early warning" signal of the sort we hear and read ever more frequently: not all evangelicals – the camp that has agitated most for school prayer, football-game invocations, and legislative chaplains – are pleased with the bargain they'll be getting in a richly pluralist America....Lamer may do a disservice to civil religion, chaplains, tolerance, amity, and public-prayer advocates. He does a service to those who want more serious second-thinking about what exactly comes with public worship in a society condemned to be diverse.

=== The Raden Report ===
The Christian authors of "The Raden Report" in an article titled "Religion and Politics Can't Mix" agreed with Lamer's position but took him to task for not realizing that the full-time Chaplain of the House was a Roman Catholic (the guest chaplain a week before Samuldrala had been the first Catholic nun in the post). The authors of "The Raden Report" maintained that recent statements of the Roman Catholic Church downplayed Christianity's traditional claim that belief in Jesus is necessary to achieve an afterlife of eternal bliss. They sought to point out to Lamer and like-minded readers that:

F.Y.I... Roman Catholic priest Daniel Coughlin is the official chaplain for the US House of Representatives, a position funded annually by tax payers to the tune of $138,000.00. Of course, as a Roman Catholic priest, Mr. Coughlin must uphold official declarations from the Vatican.

Pope says some can be saved without faith in Jesus...

Related to this issue of Hindu prayers, a recent Vatican document, Dominus Iesus, says "various religious traditions contain and offer religious elements which come from God... Indeed some prayers and rituals of the other religions may assume a role of preparation of the Gospel...." Shocking? Only if you are unfamiliar with Roman Catholicism’s pursuit of ecumenical and interreligious dialogue over the past 35 years.

And if that heresy isn't clear enough, earlier this month the Pope restated his position, saying that among the saved are 'All who seek God with a sincere heart, including those who do not know Christ and his church.'

== Rajan Zed prayer ==
In 2007, after it was announced that Hindu cleric Rajan Zed would be the first to offer a Hindu prayer to the United States Senate, Americans United for Separation of Church and State (AU) recalled the controversy over Samuldrala and called on the Family Research Council (FRC) to live up to its statement of 2000, saying:

Now the FRC gets a chance to really make amends. We challenge the group to issue a public statement affirming religious diversity in America and welcoming Hindus to our rich tapestry of faiths. If we must have such prayers before Congress, they should respect religious diversity. Surely the FRC has no problem with that?

The FRC made no response.

== See also ==
- Chaplain of the United States House of Representatives
- Rajan Zed prayer protest
