= Siva Vishnu Temple =

Siva Vishnu Temple or Vishnu Siva Temple may refer to temples dedicated to both deities Shiva and Vishnu:

- Sri Siva Vishnu Temple, Maryland, United States
- Shiva Vishnu Hindu Temple of Greater Cleveland, Ohio, United States
- Thirumangalam Sree Maha Vishnu Siva Temple, Kerala, India

== See also ==
- Harihara, the dual representation of Vishnu (Hari) and Shiva (Hara)
- Harihareshwara Temple, Karnataka, India
