= Reuben Post =

American Presbyterian clergyman

The Reverend Reuben Post D.D.

19th & 21st Chaplain of the United States House of Representatives
- In office December 13, 1831 – December 12, 1832
- Preceded by: Ralph Randolph Gurley
- Succeeded by: William Hammett
- In office December 9, 1824 – December 13, 1830
- Preceded by: Henry Bidleman Bascom
- Succeeded by: Ralph Randolph Gurley

19th Chaplain of the United States Senate
- In office December 9, 1819 – November 17, 1820
- Preceded by: John Clark
- Succeeded by: William Ryland

Personal details
- Born: January 17, 1792 Cornwall, Vermont, U.S.
- Died: September 24, 1858 (aged 66) Charleston, South Carolina, U.S.
- Resting place: Circular Church Courtyard; Charleston, South Carolina, U.S.
- Spouse: Harriet Moffitt (m. 1823)
- Children: 5
- Education: Middlebury College (BA); Princeton Theological Seminary
- Occupation: Clergyman

Reuben Post (January 17, 1792 – September 24, 1858) was a Presbyterian clergyman who served two separate terms as Chaplain of the United States House of Representatives (1824 and 1831) and also served as Chaplain of the Senate of the United States (1819).

== Early life ==
Post was born January 17, 1792, in Cornwall, Vermont, the son of Roswell and Martha (Mead) Post. He graduated from Middlebury College, Vermont, in 1814, then studied for the ministry at Princeton Theological Seminary.

== Ministry ==
Post was ordained in Washington, D.C., on June 24, 1819. He was immediately installed as the second pastor of First Presbyterian Church, Washington D.C., succeeding Rev. John Brackenridge, D.D. John Quincy Adams was a regular worshiper there during Post's tenure.

On December 9, 1819, Post was named Chaplain of the Senate. On December 6, 1824, and again on December 5, 1831, Rev. Reuben Post was named Chaplain of the United States House of Representatives.

Post continued at First Presbyterian Church until June 24, 1836, when he was called to serve the Circular Church in Charleston, South Carolina. His inaugural sermon at the Circular Church was from Acts 10:29.

== Personal life ==
Reuben Post married Harriet Moffitt, a granddaughter of Richard Henry Lee, on January 7, 1823. Their children were: William, Harriet Lee (Mrs. Henry L. Pinckney), Emily, Frances, and Richard Henry Lee Post.

== Later years ==
Post served as pastor of the Circular Church for 23 years. He was also president of the board of supervisors of the high school in Charleston. In 1858, Post took a vacation to his native Vermont; while there a yellow fever epidemic broke out in Charleston. Post returned at once to care for members of his congregation, and soon fell victim himself and died in the 23rd year of his pastorate there. A memorial tablet was placed in the church and his gravestone is in the church courtyard, along with those of his wife and daughter—they are in the shapes of chess pieces: a king, a queen and a rook.

Religious titles
Preceded by John Clark	Chaplain of the United States Senate; December 9, 1819 – November 17, 1820	Succeeded by William Ryland
Preceded by Henry Bidleman Bascom	Chaplain of the United States House of Representatives; December 26, 1824 – December 6, 1830	Succeeded by Ralph Randolph Gurley
Preceded by Ralph Randolph Gurley	Chaplain of the United States House of Representatives; December 5, 1831 – December 3, 1832	Succeeded by William Hammett
