= John Maffitt =

John Maffitt may refer to:

- Reverend John Newland Maffitt (preacher), Methodist itinerant preacher in the United States
- Commander John Newland Maffitt (privateer), officer in the United States Navy and Confederate States Navy, nicknamed the "Prince of Privateers", son of the above
