= Jesse Lee (Methodist) =

American Methodist Episcopal clergyman and pioneer

- Born: March 12, 1758; Prince George's County, Va.
- Died: September 12, 1816 (aged 58); Baltimore, Maryland
- Occupations: Preacher and chaplain

Jesse Lee (March 12, 1758 – September 12, 1816) was an American Methodist Episcopal clergyman and pioneer, born in Prince George's County, Virginia. A preacher after 1783, in 1789 he visited New England and established Methodism from the Connecticut River to the farthest settlement in Maine. He formed the first Methodist class in New England, at Stratford, Connecticut, September 26, 1787. He preached his first sermon (outdoors) on June 7 or 17, 1789 in Norwalk, Connecticut. He held the first Methodist class in Boston, Massachusetts on July 13, 1792. For his pioneer work in New England he was often called the Apostle of Methodism. He was a friend of Francis Asbury, and served as his assistant from 1797 to 1800. He lacked only one vote of being elected Bishop by the General Conference of 1800, but was appointed to be a presiding elder of the south district of Virginia in 1801. He wrote A Short Account of the Life and Death of the Rev. John Lee (1805) and a History of Methodism in America (1807), which has value for the early period. On May 22, 1809, Lee was appointed Chaplain of the United States House of Representatives He was reappointed on November 2, 1812, and served for two sessions. Upon leaving the chaplaincy of the House he was appointed Chaplain of the United States Senate on September 27, 1814, where he served until December 1815.

== Speech at Norwalk ==
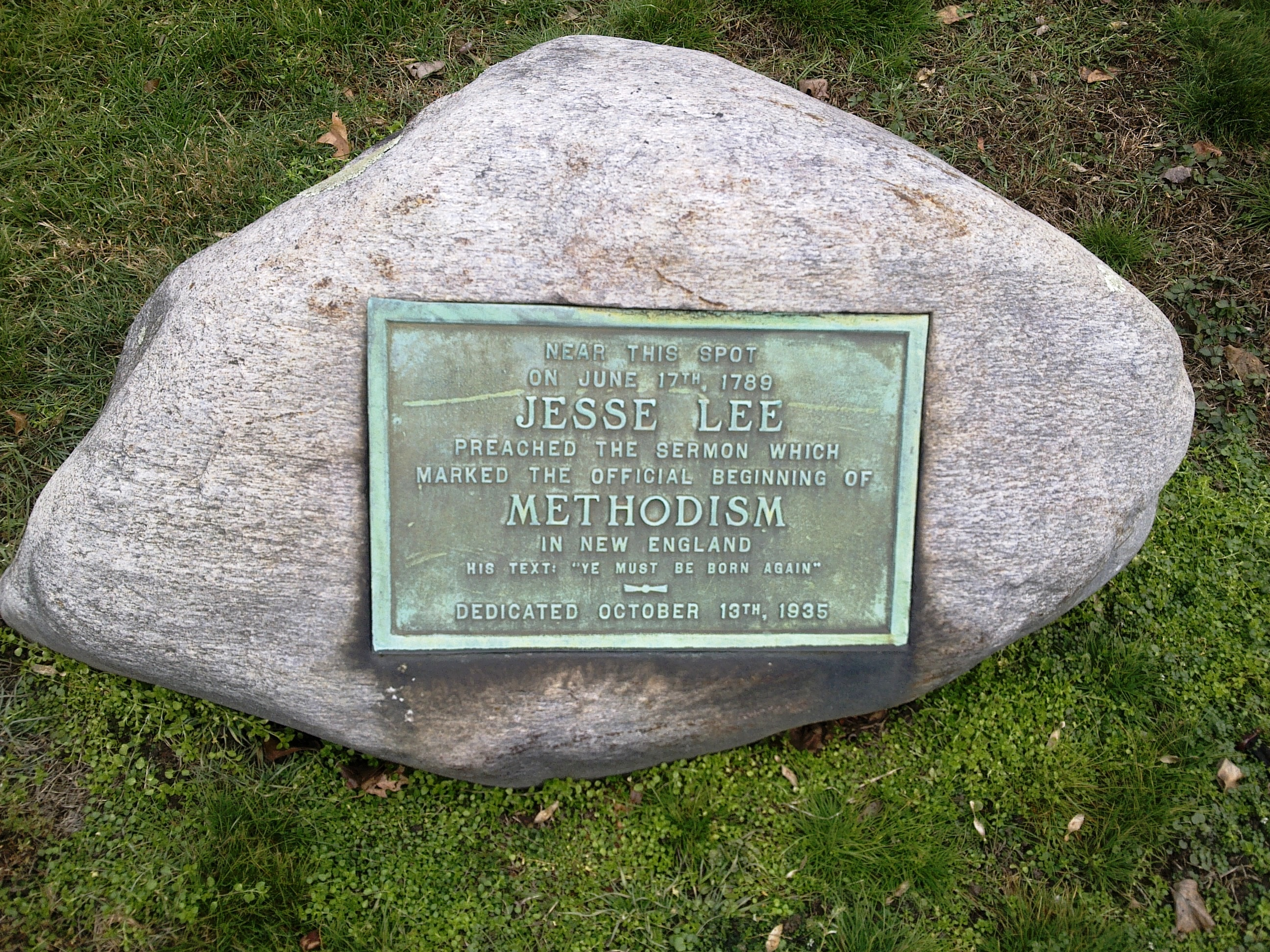
Stone marker at the intersection of North Avenue and Main Street in Norwalk, Connecticut.

In June 1789, Lee, came to Norwalk to preach his first sermon in Connecticut. He had some reason to believe that the Hezekiah Rogers house on Cross Street would be available for the meeting, and word had been sent around among those interested to assemble there. When Lee arrived, Hezekiah was not at home, and his wife hesitated to open the house to a public meeting. A neighbor refused to let Lee use her orchard for concern that the gathering would trample down the grass. Finally, Lee assembled his audience under an apple tree by the roadside and preached his sermon from the text "Ye must be born again." Such was the beginning of Methodism in Norwalk. Today, there is a stone marker at the location.

== Church at Granville ==
In 1797 the first Methodist Episcopal church west of the Connecticut River was built in Granville, Massachusetts. On September 19, 1798, Jesse Lee and Francis Asbury led the Third New England Annual Conference there.

== See also ==
- Second Great Awakening
- Mount Olivet Cemetery (Baltimore)
- Jesse Lee Home for Children
- Jesse Lee Church, the oldest Methodist church in Maine

== Literature ==
- Minton Thrift, Memoir of the Rev. Jesse Lee, with Extracts from his Journals (New York, 1823)
- L. M. Lee, Life and Times of Jesse Lee (Richmond, Va., 1848)
- W. H. Meredith, Jesse Lee, A Methodist Apostle (New York, 1909)

Religious titles
Preceded by Obadiah Bruen Brown	Chaplain of the United States House of Representatives; May 22, 1809 – November 4, 1811	Succeeded by Nicholas Snethen
Preceded by Nicholas Snethen	Chaplain of the United States House of Representatives; November 2, 1812 – September 19, 1814	Succeeded by Obadiah Bruen Brown
Preceded by John Brackenridge, D.D.	Chaplain of the United States Senate; September 27, 1814 – December 8, 1815	Succeeded by John Glendy
