= Chaplain of the United States House of Representatives =

Officer of the United States House of Representatives

- Seal of the House of Representatives

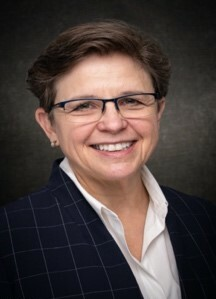
- Incumbent; Margaret G. Kibben; Acting
- Type: Chaplain
- Appointer: House of Representatives; with a majority vote
- Term length: 2 years, elected at the start of each Congress
- Constituting instrument: Constitution of the United States, Article I, Section 2
- Formation: May 1, 1789
- First holder: William Linn

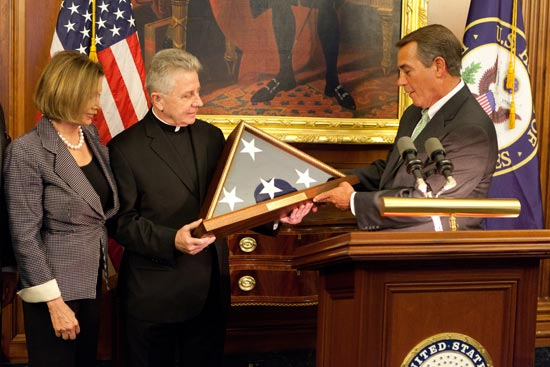
House Speaker John Boehner and Minority Leader Nancy Pelosi present a flag flown over the U.S. Capitol to Fr. Daniel Coughlin, in recognition of his 11 years of service as the 59th chaplain of the House of Representatives, April 2011

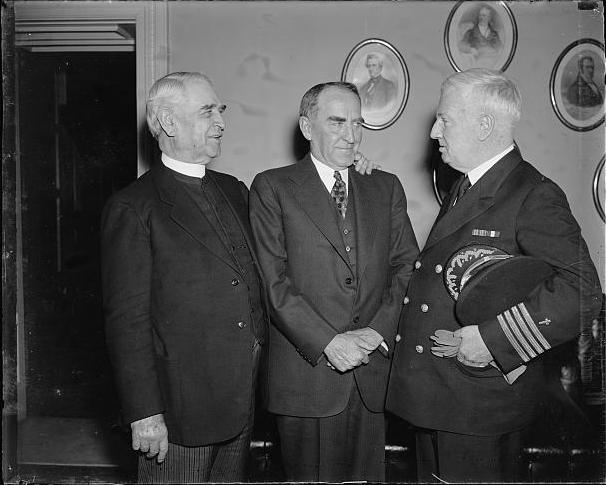
House Chaplain James Shera Montgomery and Speaker William Bankhead welcome Navy Chief of Chaplains Edward A. Duff, the first Navy chaplain in 117 years (since 1820) to open a House session as guest chaplain, March 25, 1937

The chaplain of the United States House of Representatives is the officer of the United States House of Representatives responsible for beginning each day's proceedings with a prayer. The House cites the first half of Article 1, Section 2, Clause 5 in the United States Constitution as giving it the authority to elect a chaplain, "The House of Representatives shall choose their speaker and other officers".

The office of the clerk of the House explains "The other officers have been created and their duties defined by the rules of the House, which also are made pursuant to the authority of the Constitution, hence one of the rules prescribes the duties of the chaplain."

In addition to opening proceedings with prayer, the chaplain provides pastoral counseling to the House community, coordinates the scheduling of guest chaplains, and arranges memorial services for the House and its staff. In the past, chaplains have performed marriage and funeral ceremonies for House members.

Chaplains are elected as individuals and not as representatives of any religious community, body, or organization. As of 2022, all House chaplains have been Christian but can be members of any religion or faith group. Guest chaplains, recommended by congressional members to deliver the session's opening prayer in place of the House chaplain, have represented many different religious groups, including Judaism and Islam.

== Duties ==
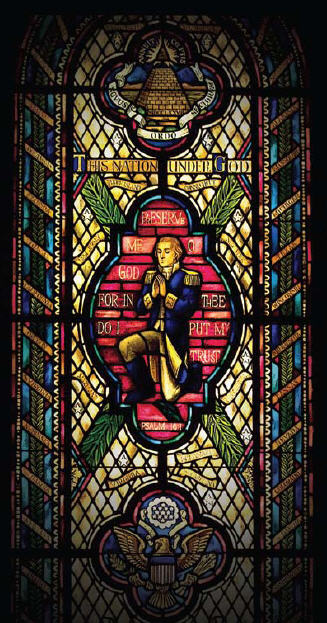
Stained glass window of George Washington in prayer, Capitol Prayer Room

The chaplain of the United States House of Representatives is chosen to "perform ceremonial, symbolic, and pastoral duties". These responsibilities include opening House sessions with a prayer or coordinating the delivery of the prayer by guest chaplains recommended by members of the House.

The House chaplain is also responsible for "hosting" guest chaplains on the day they deliver prayers.

The chaplain also provides pastoral care for members of Congress, their staffs, and their families, and provides or oversees religious programs such as Bible study, reflection groups, and the weekly Senate Prayer Breakfast. The chaplain also often presides over religious ceremonies such as funerals and memorial services for current or past members and participates, offering delivering the invocation or benediction, at many official U.S. ceremonies, including White House events. In a January 2011 post on "On Watch in Washington", the chaplain of the Senate as well as the chaplain of the House were included as part of "Obama's Spiritual Cabinet".

Along with the Senate chaplain, the House chaplain is responsible for overseeing the Capitol Prayer Room, located near the Capitol Rotunda. Dedicated in 1955, there are no worship services held in the room, nor is it normally open to the public. Instead, as described by House Speaker Sam Rayburn during the room's dedication, it is a place for members "who want to be alone with their God."

While all House chaplains have been Christian, guest chaplains have been selected to deliver occasional prayers to open House sessions "for many decades", and have represented both Christian and non-Christian faiths, including Judaism, Islam, Hinduism, and Sikhism. Congressional members are limited to one guest chaplain recommendation per Congress,

=== Opening prayer ===
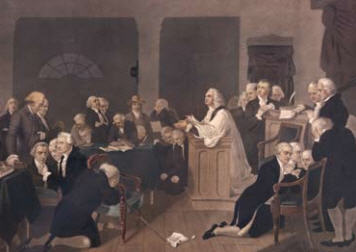
The Rev. Jacob Duché leading the first prayer for the Second Continental Congress, Philadelphia, September 7, 1774

Prayer before the opening of a legislative body traces its origins back to the colonial period. At that time, before the Constitution and its amendments separated church and colonial assemblies would open proceedings with prayer.

According to John Adams, when the Second Continental Congress gathered in September 1774, Thomas Cushing (who opposed independence and was replaced in the Congress the next year) requested that the proceedings open with a prayer. Adams wrote that John Jay and John Rutledge, who would become the first and second Chief Justices of the U.S. Supreme Court, opposed the prayer "because we were so divided in religious Sentiments." Samuel Adams spoke in favor and the motion carried. The Congress selected Anglican priest Jacob Duché to "read Prayers to the Congress" on September 5, 1774. On that day, Rev. Duché read the service of the Church of England and an extemporaneous prayer before debates continued. Rev. Duché was later made the official chaplain of the Continental Congress and served in that capacity until five days after the signing of the Declaration of Independence. Duché eventually betrayed the cause of American independence and maligned the Continental army in a letter to George Washington. Of Independence, Duché wrote: "independency was the idol, which they had long wished to set up, & that rather than sacrifice this, they would deluge their Country in Blood" and of the "Necessity of rescinding the hasty & ill-advised declaration of Independency." Of the army, "Have you, can you have the least Confidence in a Sett of undisciplined Men, & Officers, many of whom have been taken from the lowest of the People, without Principle, without Courage."

The tradition of prayers ended at the Constitutional Convention. When Benjamin Franklin proposed a prayer on June 28, 1787, the Convention rejected his proposal. Alexander Hamilton supposedly argued against the motion because the delegates did not need to call in "foreign aid," though the story is perhaps apocryphal. However, it is certain that the Constitutional Convention did not even vote on Franklin's prayer motion, let alone pass the resolution. “After several unsuccessful attempts for silently postponing the matter by adjourning,” it failed. Franklin himself wrote that “The [Constitutional] Convention, except three or four persons, thought Prayers unnecessary."

The clerk of the House notes that "On December 22, 1776; on December 13, 1784; and on February 29, 1788, it was resolved that two chaplains should be appointed. So far for the old [unicameral] American Congress [under the Articles of Confederation]."

In 1789, chaplain's prayers opened Congress, both House and Senate. Different (mainstream Christian) denominations were appointed to House and Senate, presumably with the goal of pluralism. (A recent letter by James Madison, future president and considered primary impetus to the U.S. Constitution, opposed hiring chaplains, on the grounds it violated the Bill of Rights' requirement of disestablishment of religion, and also discriminated against religious groups such as Quakers and Catholics, who "could scarcely be elected to the office".)

The clerk of the House points out "The chaplain opens each day's session with prayer, for which he receives a salary...It is not stipulated that prayers be short, or that Members stand during the service, but brevity and reverence are usually observed."

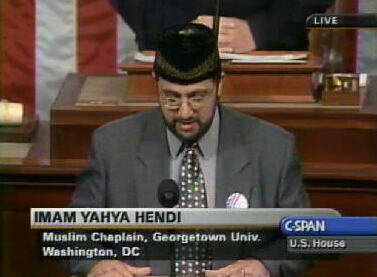
Imam Yahya Hendi delivers opening prayer as guest chaplain, November 15, 2001

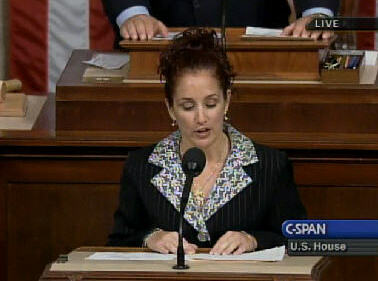
Rabbi Amy Rader delivers opening prayer as guest chaplain, September 14, 2006

=== Ministry of Outreach ===
The official brochure of the chaplain of the United States House of Representatives lists the following elements of the "ministry of outreach" provided by the chaplain:

- To bring a dimension of faith to human events, giving praise and thanks to God for what God is doing in the world, in the nation, and in and through leaders and ordinary citizens
- To offer counsel for Members of Congress, families, and staff
- To welcome and assist guest chaplains on their day of service to the House
- To receive religious leaders from across the nation and around the world
- To develop interfaith dialogue for better understanding and relationships
- To meet representatives of other nations to discuss how religion and politics interface on Capitol Hill
- To provide answers to religious questions and research information about religious organizations and services in the area of Capitol Hill
- To sponsor occasional activities of a religious nature for Members of Congress and staff
- To offer a Web site with pertinent information about the Chaplain's Office

== History ==
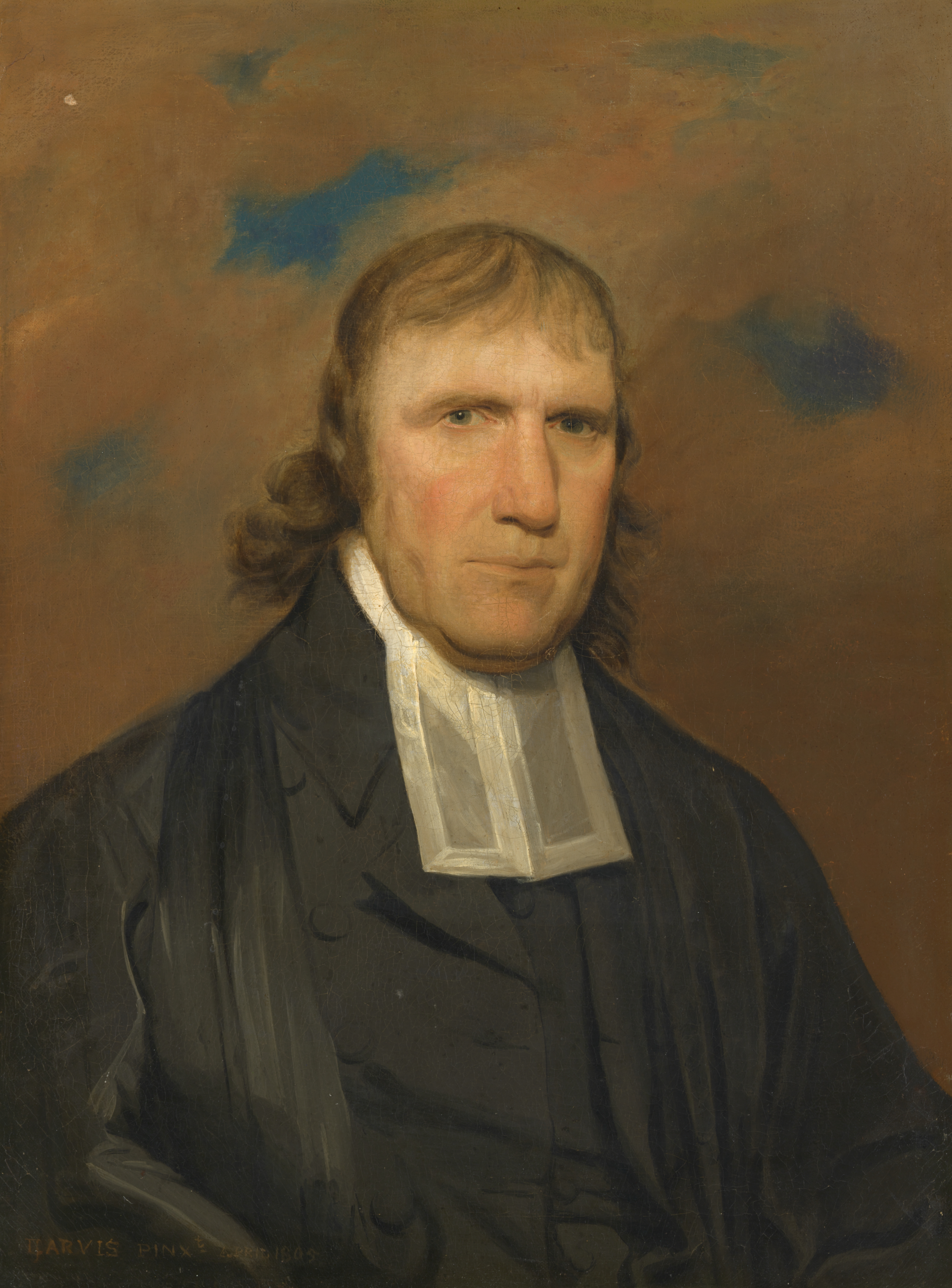
William Linn, the first Chaplain of the U.S. House of Representatives

Rev. Daniel Waldo (1762–1864), Chaplain of the U.S. House of Representatives 1856-1857

The election of William Linn as first chaplain of the House on May 1, 1789, continued the tradition established by the Second Continental Congress of each day's proceedings opening with a prayer by a chaplain.

Shortly after Congress first convened in April 1789 in New York City, one of its "first orders of business" was to convene a committee to recommend a chaplain, eventually selecting the Reverend William Linn as the first chaplain of the United States House of Representatives. The clerk of the House relates "The First Congress under the Constitution began on the 4th of March, 1789; but there was not a quorum for business till the 1st of April. On the 9th of that month Oliver Ellsworth was appointed, on the part of the Senate, to confer with a committee of the House on Rules, and on the appointment of chaplains. The House chose five men - Boudinot, Bland, Tucker, Sherman, and Madison. The result of their consultation was a recommendation to appoint two chaplains of different denominations - one by the Senate and one by the House - to interchange weekly. The Senate appointed Dr. Provost, on the 25th of April. On the 1st day of May, Washington's first speech was read to the House, and the first business after the speech was the appointment of Dr. Linn as chaplain. ...The law of 1789 was passed in compliance with their [the joint committee's] plan, giving chaplains a salary...It was reenacted in 1816, and continues to the present time. ...Originally the chaplain was not an official of the House. A concurrent resolution named two clergymen of different denominations, who, interchanging weekly supplied the Senate and House." The two chaplains also conducted Sunday services for the Washington community in the House chamber every other week.

When the body moved to Philadelphia in 1790, and then to Washington, D.C., clergy from various Christian denominations ("mainline Protestant denominations--usually Episcopalians or Presbyterians") continued to be selected, delivering prayers and presiding at funerals and memorial services. During this early period, chaplains "typically served" for less than a year while concurrently serving in non-congressional positions.

Clergy have served in the official position of House Chaplain for all years since the office was created except for the brief period of 1855-1861 (and the Senate has had chaplains for every year except 1857–1859). According to the clerk of the House, "During a protracted struggle over the organization of the House [due to internal division within the ruling party over slavery] in the 34th Congress, and before a chaplain was elected the House was opened alternately with prayer daily by minister of the gospel of Washington."

The "status [of the chaplain] remained unfixed. It was objected that neither the Constitution nor the law recognized such an officer, and not until the payment of his salary depended upon his taking the ironclad oath, adopted in 1862 did his official character become established."

Since 1914, the Chaplain's Prayer has been included in the Congressional Record.

The chaplain of the House of Representatives and the chaplain of the Senate became full-time positions in the middle of the 20th century.

== Selection ==
The chaplain must be elected to a two-year term at "the beginning of each Congress". Both the House and Senate chaplains are elected as individuals, "not as representatives of any religious body or denominational entity".

Selection of House chaplains has "generally not been subject to party considerations".

== Constitutionality ==
The question of the constitutionality of the position of the House chaplain (as well as that of the Senate chaplain, and at times, that of military chaplains as well), has been a subject of study and debate over the centuries. Opponents have argued that it violates the separation of church-and-state and proponents have argued, among other factors, that the fact that the same early legislators who wrote the United States Constitution and its Bill of Rights, from which the position of "non-establishment" and church and state separation is derived, were the same ones who approved and appointed the chaplains.

=== Madison ===
President James Madison was an example of one U.S. leader who ultimately came to think that the positions of Senate and House chaplains could not be constitutionally supported, although whether he always held this view (and to what extent he believed it at various times during his life) is a subject of debate. However it is clear from his "Detached Memoranda" writings during his retirement that he had come to believe the positions could not be justified:

Is the appointment of Chaplains to the two Houses of Congress consistent with the Constitution, and with the pure principle of religious freedom?

In strictness the answer on both points must be in the negative. The Constitution of the U. S. forbids everything like an establishment of a national religion. The law appointing Chaplains establishes a religious worship for the national representatives, to be performed by Ministers of religion, elected by a majority of them; and these are to be paid out of the national taxes. Does not this involve the principle of a national establishment, applicable to a provision for a religious worship for the Constituent as well as of the representative Body, approved by the majority, and conducted by Ministers of religion paid by the entire nation.

The establishment of the chaplainship to Congress is a palpable violation of equal rights, as well as of Constitutional principles: The tenets of the chaplains elected [by the majority] shut the door of worship against the members whose creeds & consciences forbid a participation in that of the majority. To say nothing of other sects, this is the case with that of Roman Catholics & Quakers who have always had members in one or both of the Legislative branches. Could a Catholic clergyman ever hope to be appointed a Chaplain? To say that his religious principles are obnoxious or that his sect is small, is to lift the evil at once and exhibit in its naked deformity the doctrine that religious truth is to be tested by numbers, or that the major sects have a right to govern the minor.

=== 1857 challenge ===
Due to the prolonged struggle to elect a Speaker of the House in 1855 no official chaplain was named either. To continue the tradition of opening with prayer local D.C. ministers were employed. According to the clerk of the House "Their prayers, it seems, too often evinced something of the partisan spirit [over slavery and State's rights] that characterized the pending controversy, and in the following Congress (1857) certain Members who claimed that the employment of chaplains conflicted with the spirit of the Constitution and tended to promote a union of church and state, made a determined effort to discontinue their use. This aroused the churches of the country". This led to "an acrimonious debate [in] the House" which resulted in an overwhelming majority resolving "That the daily sessions of this body be opened with prayer".

=== Court cases ===
The constitutionality question has been examined in a number of court cases. According to "House and Senate Chaplains: An Overview", an official 2011 CRS Report created by the Congressional Research Service for "Members and Committees of Congress":

The constitutionality of legislative chaplains was upheld in 1983 by the Supreme Court (Marsh v. Chambers, 463 U.S. 783, related to chaplains in the Nebraska Legislature) on the grounds of precedent and tradition. The Court cited the practice going back to the Continental Congress in 1774 and noted that the custom "is deeply embedded in the history and tradition of this country" from colonial times and the founding of the republic. Further, the Court held that the use of prayer "has become part of the fabric of our society," coexisting with "the principles of disestablishment and religious freedom." This decision was cited in Murray v. Buchanan, which challenged the House chaplaincy, the next year. On appeal, the U.S. Court of Appeals for the District of Columbia dismissed the complaint "for want of a substantial constitutional question." Subsequently, on March 25, 2004, the U.S. District Court for the District of Columbia, citing Marsh v. Chambers, dismissed a suit that challenged the congressional practice of paid chaplains as well as the practice of opening legislative sessions with prayer.

In 2000, a C-SPAN "public affairs on the web" response to the question of constitutional challenges noted that:

In 1983, the Supreme Court upheld the practice of having an official chaplain as deeply ingrained in the history and tradition of this country. They stated the ultimate authority for the position lies in the Constitution which states that the House and Senate may each choose their officers, with no restrictions on what kind of officers may be chosen. Using that authority, both chambers have chosen to continue to elect an officer to act as Chaplain.

== Controversies ==
In addition to court cases, controversy regarding the chaplain's position included a number of petitions to abolish both the Senate and House chaplains that were submitted as early as the 1850s, for reasons including claims that the positions represented a violation of the separation of church and state and that the choice of chaplains had become too politicized. From 1855 to 1861, the election of chaplains for the House and from 1857 to 1859, the election of chaplains for the Senate were suspended, with local clergy invited to serve on a voluntary basis, instead. However, as a result of "the difficulty in obtaining volunteer chaplains" and the opportunity for volunteer chaplains to get to know "their flock", Congress returned to the practice of selecting official chaplains for both the House and the Senate.

Reverend William H. Milburn while serving as chaplain in the 52nd Congress "got into the habit of praying against gambling in stocks and bonds". "So regular and persistent were the chaplain's daily attacks upon 'bucket shops'" that Rep. Dunham from Chicago ("a prominent member of the Chicago Stock Exchange") "went to [House Speaker] 'Tom' Reed and objected vehemently to what he said was getting 'personal'". Reed dismissed Dunham's concerns out of hand, claiming "it's only the Chaplain's way of telling the Lord all the news".

In September 2000, guest chaplain Venkatachalapathi Samuldrala opened a session with a Hindu prayer sparking protests from some conservative Christian media figures.

== Current chaplain ==
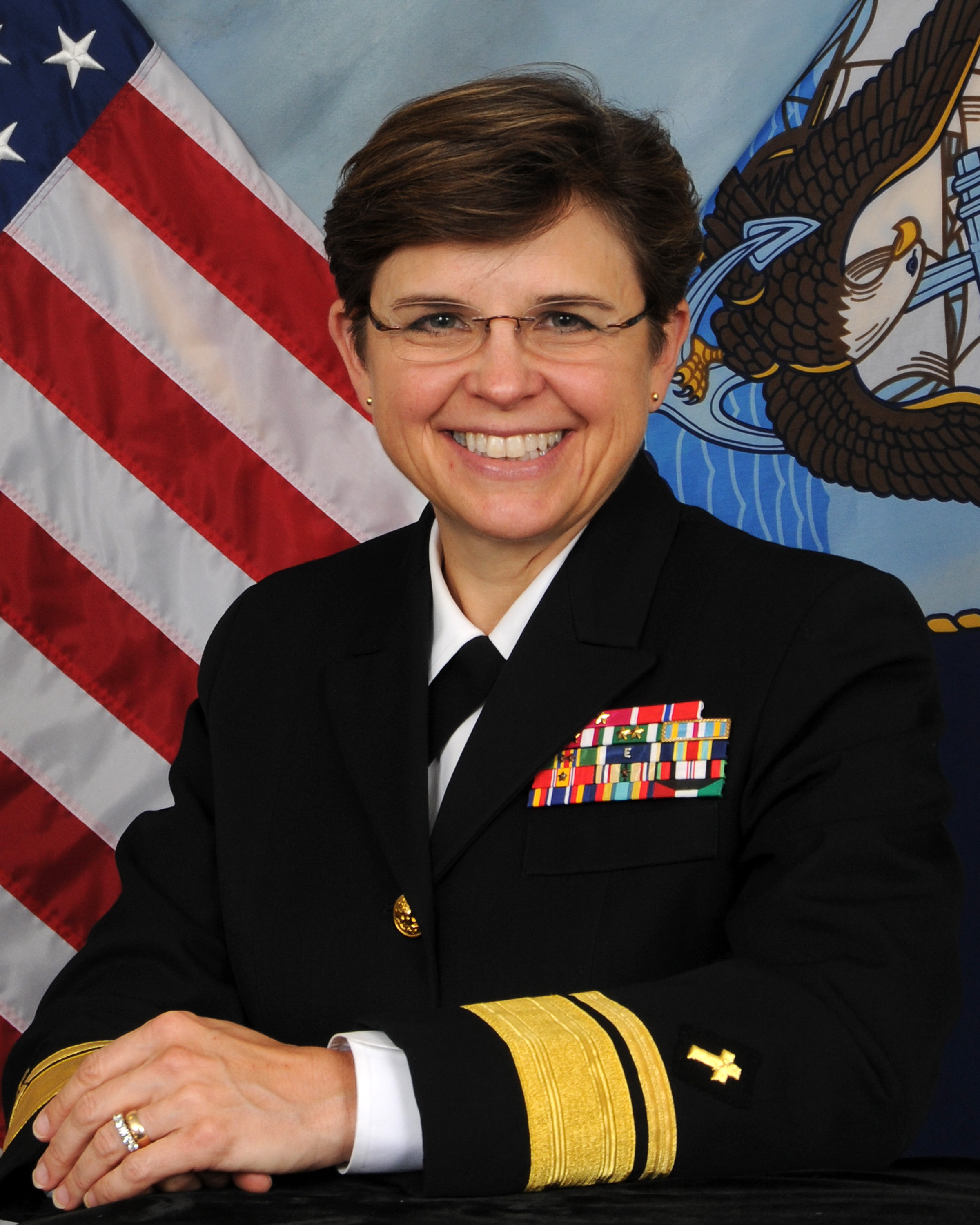
Retired Navy Rear Adm. Margaret Grun Kibben, 62nd chaplain of the House of Representatives

Retired Navy Rear Adm. Margaret Grun Kibben, a Presbyterian minister, currently serves as the 62nd chaplain of the House of Representatives. Her selection was announced by the office of Nancy Pelosi, Speaker of the United States House of Representatives, on December 31, 2020, and she was sworn in as the new House chaplain on January 3, 2021. She is the first woman to serve in the role.

== List of House chaplains ==
Information regarding past and current House chaplains, taken from the official House of Representatives website, includes the following:

No.	Date of Appointment	Chaplain	Photo	Denomination	Notes
1.	May 1, 1789	William Linn		Presbyterian	
2.	December 10, 1790	Samuel Blair		Presbyterian	
3.	November 5, 1792	Ashbel Green		Presbyterian	
4.	November 27, 1800	Thomas Lyell		Methodist	
5.	December 10, 1801	William Parkinson		Baptist	
6.	November 30, 1804	James Laurie		Presbyterian	
7.	December 4, 1806	Robert Elliott		Presbyterian	
8.	October 30, 1807	Obadiah Bruen Brown		Baptist	Also No. 12
9.	May 27, 1809	Jesse Lee		Methodist	Also No. 11
10.	November 13, 1811	Nicholas Snethen		Methodist	
11.	November 6, 1812	Jesse Lee		Methodist	Also No. 9
12.	September 23, 1814	Obadiah Bruen Brown		Baptist	Also No. 8
13.	December 7, 1815	Spencer Houghton Cone		Baptist	
14.	December 5, 1816	Burgiss Allison		Baptist	
15.	November 16, 1820	John Nicholson Campbell		Presbyterian	
16.	December 10, 1821	Jared Sparks		Unitarian	
17.	December 5, 1822	John Brackenridge, D.D.		Presbyterian	
18.	December 8, 1823	Henry Bidleman Bascom		Methodist	
19.	December 9, 1824	Reuben Post		Presbyterian	Also No.21
20.	December 13, 1830	Ralph Randolph Gurley		Presbyterian	Also No. 38
21.	December 13, 1831	Reuben Post		Presbyterian	Also No. 19
22.	December 12, 1832	William Hammett		Methodist	
23.	December 9, 1833	Thomas H. Stockton		Methodist	Also Nos. 25, 43
24.	December 10, 1834	Edward Dunlap Smith		Presbyterian	
25.	December 24, 1835	Thomas H. Stockton		Methodist	Also Nos. 23, 43
26.	December 20, 1836	Oliver C. Comstock		Baptist	
27.	September 12, 1837	Septimus Tustin		Presbyterian	
28.	December 11, 1837	Levi R. Reese		Methodist	
29.	February 4, 1840	Joshua Bates		Congregationalist	
30.	December 15, 1840	Thomas W. Braxton		Baptist	
31.	June 9, 1841	John W. French		Episcopalian	
32.	December 13, 1841	John Newland Maffitt		Methodist	
33.	December 14, 1842	Frederick T. Tiffany		Episcopalian	
34.	December 16, 1843	Isaac S. Tinsley		Baptist	
35.	December 4, 1844	William Mitchel Daily		Methodist	
36.	December 1, 1845	William Henry Milburn		Methodist	Also Nos. 41, 52
37.	December 7, 1846	William T.S. Sprole		Presbyterian	
38.	December 6, 1847	Ralph Randolph Gurley		Presbyterian	Also No. 20
39.	December 1, 1851	Lyttleton Morgan		Methodist	
40.	December 6, 1852	James Gallaher		Presbyterian	
41.	December 5, 1853	William Henry Milburn		Methodist	Also Nos. 36, 52
N/A	March 4, 1855	None		N/A	
42.	February 21, 1856	Daniel Waldo		Congregationalist	
43.	July 4, 1861	Thomas H. Stockton		Methodist	Also Nos. 23, 25
44.	December 7, 1863	William Henry Channing		Unitarian	
45.	December 4, 1865	Charles B. Boynton		Congregationalist	
46.	March 4, 1869	John George Butler		Lutheran	
47.	December 6, 1875	Israel Leander Townsend		Episcopalian	
48.	October 15, 1877	John Poise		Methodist	
49.	December 3, 1877	W.P. Harrison		Methodist	
50.	December 5, 1881	Frederick Dunglison Power		Disciples of Christ	
51.	December 3, 1883	John Summerfield Lindsay		Episcopalian	
52.	December 7, 1885	William Henry Milburn		Methodist	Also Nos. 36, 41
53.	August 7, 1893	Samuel W. Haddaway		Methodist	
54.	December 4, 1893	Edward B. Bagby		Disciples of Christ	
55.	December 2, 1895	Henry N. Couden		Universalist	
56.	April 11, 1921	James Shera Montgomery		Methodist	
57.	January 3, 1950	Bernard Braskamp		Presbyterian	
58.	January 10, 1967	Edward G. Latch		Methodist	
59.	January 15, 1979	James D. Ford		Lutheran	
60.	March 23, 2000	Daniel P. Coughlin		Roman Catholic	
61.	May 25, 2011	Patrick J. Conroy		Roman Catholic	
62.	January 3, 2021	Margaret G. Kibben		Presbyterian	

== Demographics ==
The following table represents a breakdown by religion of past and current House chaplains. It also shows the median year that chaplains of that denomination served. The total number does not match the official number of House chaplains, which as of 2021 is 62, because the numbers in this table represent individuals and some individuals served in the position more than once.

Gender	Count
Male	52
Female	1

Denomination	Count	Most Recent Appointment
Methodist	16	1967
Presbyterian	15	2021
Baptist	7	1843
Episcopalian	4	1883
Lutheran	2	1979
Unitarian	2	1863
Congregationalist	2	1865
Disciples of Christ	2	1893
Roman Catholic	2	2011
Universalist	1	1895
Total	53	2021

== See also ==
- Chaplain of the United States Senate
