= Patrick J. Conroy =

American lawyer and priest (born 1950)

The Reverend Patrick J. Conroy SJ

60th Chaplain of the United States House of Representatives
- In office May 25, 2011 – January 3, 2021
- Preceded by: Daniel Coughlin
- Succeeded by: Margaret G. Kibben

Personal details
- Born: October 31, 1950 (age 75) Everett, Washington, U.S.
- Education: Claremont McKenna College (BA); Gonzaga University (MA); Saint Louis University (JD); Santa Clara University (MDiv); University of Toronto (STM)

Patrick J. Conroy SJ (born October 31, 1950) is an American lawyer and a Jesuit priest who served as the 60th Chaplain of the United States House of Representatives. His selection was announced by the Speaker of the United States House of Representatives on May 6, 2011, and he was sworn in as the new House Chaplain May 25, 2011, following a unanimous vote by the House. Conroy delivered his first prayer as House Chaplain on May 26, 2011. In mid-April 2018, Conroy was asked to resign by House Speaker Paul Ryan, and did so with an effective resignation date of May 24, 2018. Approximately two weeks later, Conroy rescinded his resignation and announced his intention to remain in the role after objections to Ryan's actions were raised by lawmakers on both sides of the aisle. Speaker Ryan accepted the withdrawal of Conroy's resignation letter and reinstated him as House Chaplain on May 3, 2018.

== Life and works ==
=== Early life ===
Conroy was born October 31, 1950, in Everett, Washington. When his parents divorced in 1958, he moved with his mother to Arlington, Virginia, living there until midway through his sophomore year in high school. Halfway through his sophomore year he moved back to Washington to live with his father. He transferred to Snohomish High School and graduated in 1968. Conroy's mother, Ruth, has lived in Naples, Florida, since 1984. His mother died on July 30, 2021, 3 days before her 99th birthday. In her instructions, she requested that Conroy "do his job". He led the Rite of Committal at her graveside on August 10, 2021.

He received a bachelor's degree from Claremont Men's College in Claremont, California, in 1972.

In 1977, he received a master's degree in philosophy from Gonzaga University in Spokane, Washington; in 1979, a J.D. degree from St. Louis University; in 1983, a Masters of Divinity (M.Div.) from the Jesuit School of Theology of Santa Clara University, in Berkeley, California; and in 1984, a Masters of Sacred Theology (S.T.M.) from Regis College, University of Toronto.

=== Pastor and teacher ===
Ordained in 1983, his past work includes service as a parish priest, pastor of St. Michael's Mission in Inchelium, Washington, where the members of his congregation included residents of the Colville Indian Reservation and the Spokane Indian Reservation.

From 1986 to 1989, he served as pastor of St Philip Benizi in Ford, Washington, Sacred Heart Mission in Wellpinit, Washington, and Our Lady of Lourdes in West End, Washington, serving the people of the Spokane Indian Reservation. From 1990 to 1994 and again from 1997 to 2003, he was chaplain at Georgetown University. In between, Conroy was chaplain at Seattle University.

While at Georgetown, Conroy – then universally known as "Father Pat" – was director of ESCAPE, a special student retreat program. Although described as non-religious (and therefore open to all students) the program "grows out of Georgetown's Catholic traditions ... Jesuit education is not designed to force you into a way of life imposed from the outside, but to help you discover in yourself what it is that gives you the most meaning, the most peace and the most joy", Conroy explained.

On the occasion of Conroy's 25th anniversary of his ordination as a priest, the Northwest Province of the Society of Jesus used these words to describe him: "Pat's talent for connecting with people is legendary. He remembers names, faces, and notable facts of all he meets. He cares for people, and they remember him as a true friend, a true equal, and a priest they trust and in whom they can confide."

Prior to his selection as House Chaplain, he had been teaching freshman theology and coaching JV II softball at Jesuit High School in Portland, Oregon, since 2004. While working at the high school, Conroy was formation assistant for the Oregon Province of the Society of Jesus from 2006 to 2010, where his responsibilities included helping future priests work toward ordination.

=== Attorney ===
Information on the website for the Chaplain of the United States House of Representatives includes a description of Conroy's experience as a lawyer:

"During his years of training, Fr. Conroy did practice law for the Colville Confederated Tribes in Omak, Washington, representing tribal members in state courts, he represented Salvadoran refugees for the Conference of Catholic Bishops' Immigration Office in San Francisco while studying theology, and again worked for the Colville Tribes helping to develop the case for the Tribes' treaty fishing rights in the mid 1980s. He has not practiced law since 1986."

== Public prayer ==
Conroy's work with students of all religions has helped him feel comfortable with prayers that are inclusive. For example, saying that when he "know[s] there are non-Christians in the group with whom I am praying, I never pray in the name of Jesus – except when I'm doing something Catholic – saying Mass, for example."

== House chaplain ==
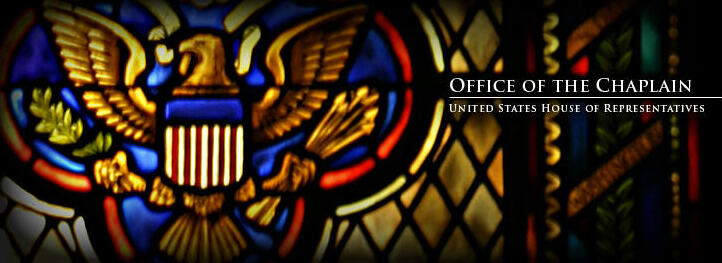

=== Selection ===
According to the Catholic Sentinel, Speaker John Boehner had positive memories of Jesuits during his time at Xavier University, and decided he preferred a Jesuit priest as the next House Chaplain.

He consulted House Minority Leader Nancy Pelosi, who "also knows and trusts Jesuits via the University of San Francisco and having sent her son to Georgetown." Fr. Daniel Coughlin, the House Chaplain preparing to retire, contacted the Jesuit office in Washington, D.C., which sent out notices to Jesuit provincials around the country, requesting that each provincial nominate one candidate. After interviews that included a May 4 meeting with Boehner and Pelosi, Conroy was offered the chance to be nominated for the position. When he announced Conroy's selection, Boehner said that Conroy, has shown a "dedication to God's work, commitment to serving others and experience working with people of faith from all traditions."

Conroy said of his nomination:

"One does not aspire to become the Chaplain to a chamber of Congress. This opportunity to serve is an extraordinary gift, and I hope to be worthy of the trust the Speaker of the House and the Minority Leader are extending to me. I am also humbled by the confidence my Jesuit superiors are demonstrating in making me available to answer this call to serve the People's House."

Conroy said that Jesuit spirituality focuses on making good decisions, based on the writings of St. Ignatius of Loyola in the 16th century. According to Conroy, that "could fit well in the business of the House of Representatives. I would hope I'd be able to remind everyone what they're about. They are not about winning something so someone else loses, but winning so everyone wins. They are there to serve, not to gain glory." He said that one of his goals would be to "help House members and staff discern which urges are coming from God and which are coming from them ... [because] you need to know the difference."

Conroy says that the understands that counseling will be a large part of his responsibilities as House Chaplain, and his past experiences have prepared him for that role: "As chaplain, I won't be responsible for the religious life of the people working on the Hill, how they practice their faith in their respective congregations. A chaplain is not a cultic figure, but more like a counselor. They know I am capable of that. It's what I did at Georgetown and what I do here (at Jesuit High School)."

Coughlin, who retired April 14, 2011, was the first Catholic priest to serve as House Chaplain; Conroy was the second Catholic priest, and the first Jesuit priest, to hold that position.

As a Jesuit, he lives in a Jesuit community in Washington, D.C., keeping a small amount of the salary he received to pay the amount he is charged to stay with them in addition to other basic needs, but donated the rest to his order.

"Jesuit communities charge a per diem. In Washington, D.C., it might be $50 a day. I'll pay that. And I'll keep enough for my working budget – something I'll decide with my provincial (supervisor) – and the rest will go to my province. The Jesuits paid for my education. The Jesuits pay for my health care, for my housing, for my transportation when I need it."

==== Controversy ====
On May 6, 2011, when his selection was announced, it was made clear that his name would be submitted to the full House for confirmation.

On May 11, Pelosi announced she was "reconsidering" support when it was revealed that the group for which Conroy worked had paid $166 million for more than 400 claims of child sexual abuse. Boehner's reaction was to say that Conroy was vetted and that the nomination would stand.

However, The Seattle Times reported that Conroy had written a letter in 1986 to then-Seattle Archbishop Raymond Hunthausen about an accusation of abuse by a priest in Hunthausen's archdiocese, and when Conroy received no reply, he did not follow up on the issue. Fr. Dennis Champagne, the accused priest, remained in the ministry until 2002, when he finally resigned after the boy made his accusations public.

The Oregon Province of the Society of Jesus paid the largest sex-abuse settlement of any order in the Catholic Church. A spokesperson for Pelosi's office stated that "new information has arisen" since the initial review of Conroy's candidacy, and would be reviewed "as expeditiously as possible" with no "pre-judgment."

According to Fox News Channel, Pelosi did not have information about the $166 million settlement when she initially supported the nomination.

A number of groups supporting alleged victims of sexual abuse said that appointing any priest from the Oregon Province of the Society of Jesus would be inappropriate, and some like the Survivors Network of those Abused by Priests (SNAP) opposed the nomination because of what they believed was insufficient action on Conroy's part to follow up to a greater extent on the knowledge of abuse that he had.

Supporters of Conroy insisted he should be judged on the fact that he was never accused of abuse or molestation, not on past problems associated with others within the group. For example, the Very Rev. Patrick Lee, the group's superior, said that "Fr. Conroy is an excellent priest worthy of the nomination made by Speaker Boehner. He has never been the subject of an allegation of child abuse."

The views of many were summed up in the statement made in a May 11 report that, "It would be a shame if the first Jesuit House chaplain is denied confirmation due to guilt by association with events that did not involve him, not even in the most tangential way." Conroy himself described the controversy like being in the middle of "a firestorm ... It's a pretty clear case of guilt by association, but my conscience is clear."

After a flurry of news reports, Drew Hamill, a spokesman for Pelosi, made the statement that "Father Conroy has responded to additional questions" and "the leader sees no obstacle to him being named chaplain."

=== Swearing in ===
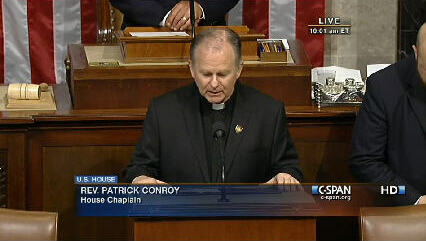
Conroy delivers his first prayer as House Chaplain, May 26, 2011

At the May 25 ceremony to swear in Conroy as the new House Chaplain, Pelosi mistakenly referred to the Speaker as "Father Boehner", with Boehner replying that he has been called "a lot of things – but not that." Pelosi told Conroy, "We pray for you. Please pray for us."

=== Resignation ===
At the request of Speaker Paul Ryan, Conroy resigned on April 16, 2018, with May 24 being his last day in office. According to Conroy, Speaker Ryan's office had admonished him for his prayers, as well as Ryan personally telling him: "Padre, you just got to stay out of politics." Approximately two weeks later, Conroy rescinded his resignation and announced his intention to remain in the role after objections to Ryan's actions were raised by lawmakers on both sides of the aisle.

With the start of the 117th Congress, Conroy was replaced by Margaret Kibben in January 2021.

== See also ==
- Chaplain
- Chaplain of the United States Senate

Religious titles
Preceded by Daniel Coughlin	Chaplain of the United States House of Representatives; 2011–2021	Succeeded by Margaret G. Kibben
