= John Nicholson Campbell =

American Presbyterian clergyman (1798–1864)

John Nicholson Campbell (March 4, 1798 – March 27, 1864) was an American Presbyterian clergyman who served as Chaplain of the United States House of Representatives.

Campbell was born in Philadelphia, Pennsylvania, on March 4, 1798. He was a pupil of James Ross, a celebrated teacher of Philadelphia, and at an early age entered the University of Pennsylvania, but was never graduated. He studied theology with Rev. Ezra Stiles, and afterward in Virginia, where he was for a few months teacher of languages in Hampden-Sydney College. On May 10, 1817, he was licensed to preach by the Presbytery of Hanover, Virginia.

On November 16, 1820, the 22-year-old Campbell was named Chaplain of the U.S. House of Representatives, serving the Sixteenth Congress. His term as Chaplain ended March 3, 1821.

After preaching in Petersburg, Virginia, and New Bern, North Carolina, he became the assistant of Rev. Dr. Balch, of Georgetown, District of Columbia, in 1823. In 1825, he accepted a call to the pastorate of Second Presbyterian Church in Washington, D.C., where Presidents John Quincy Adams and Andrew Jackson, as well as Vice President John C. Calhoun, worshipped in the 1820s. He was active in the American Colonization Society.

In 1830, Campbell and others were accused by Peggy Eaton of repeating the rumour that before her marriage, she had dined with John Eaton in Philadelphia without a chaperone. Jackson had appointed John Eaton Secretary of War, and Peggy Eaton was snubbed by Cabinet wives and other prominent Washingtonians, in what became known as the Petticoat Affair. This ultimately led to the resignations of Vice-president Calhoun and of all but one member of Jackson's Cabinet, and Campbell's stepping down from his pulpit.

In 1831, Campbell was called to the First Presbyterian Church in Albany, New York, and remained there until his death.

Religious titles
Preceded by Burgiss Allison	Chaplain of the United States House of Representatives; November 18, 1820 – December 3, 1821	Succeeded by Jared Sparks
