= John W. French =

American Episcopal clergyman and educator

John W. French (November 9, 1809 – July 8, 1871) was an American Episcopal clergyman and educator.

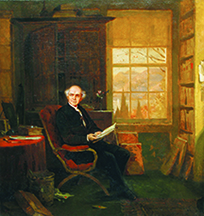
John Ferguson Weir, Portrait of John William French

== Early years ==
French was born November 9, 1809, son of Edmund French and Sarah Baldwin. His parents died when he was a child, and he was raised in Troy, New York, by his aunt, Sarah French Baldwin, and her husband William Baldwin.

== Career ==
French graduated from Washington College (now Trinity College), Hartford, Connecticut, in 1832, and from General Theological Seminary, New York City, NY. He was a professor at Bristol College, Bucks County PA, Rector of an Episcopal Church in Portland, Maine, and then first rector of the Church of the Epiphany, Washington, DC. He was appointed chaplain of the U.S. House of Representatives on May 31, 1841, and was the first Episcopalian to hold this position.

In 1856, French was named chaplain of the U.S. Military Academy, West Point, New York, and concurrently professor of geography, history, and ethics there. He served in those positions until his death.

He was the author of "Short Course of Instruction in the Practical Part of Ethics", 1858; and "Grammar: Part of a Course on Language", 1865.

== Family life ==
He married Clara Miller, and they had 6 children who survived childhood. Their son, John William French, Jr., was an officer in the U.S. Army, as were the husbands of 3 of their daughters. Their daughter Mary French married American Painter, Sculptor and Professor John Ferguson Weir. And their daughter Lillie Hamilton French was a prolific author and a long-time editor at Harper's Bazaar. Another daughter Sarah Bradley French married West Point graduate Lt. John T. Greble, who was the first USMA graduate to be killed during the Civil War.

== Death ==
French died July 8, 1871, at West Point, and is buried at the U.S. Military Academy cemetery.

== Notes ==
Religious titles
Preceded by Thomas W. Braxton	Chaplain of the United States House of Representatives; June 9, 1841 – December 13, 1841	Succeeded by John Newland Maffitt
