= Thomas H. Stockton =

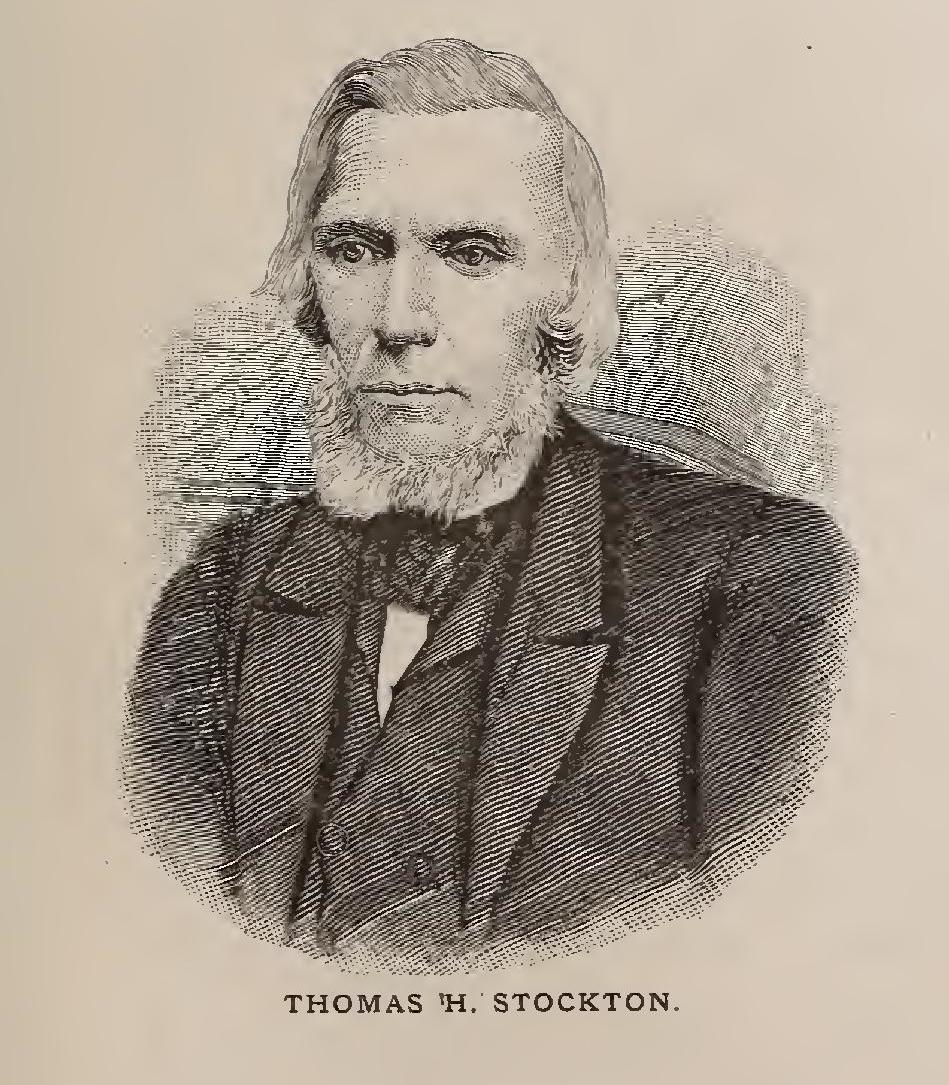
- Born: 1808
- Died: 1868
- Resting place: Mount Moriah Cemetery

Thomas H. Stockton (1808–1868) served as the Chaplain of the United States House of Representatives in 1833, 1835, 1859 and 1861. He was also the pastor of the First Methodist Church in Philadelphia and the editor of Christian World.

Stockton was born at Mount Holly, New Jersey. His father, William S. Stockton, was the founder and editor of the Wesleyan Repository. He joined the Methodist Protestant Church and was closely associated with their founder, Thomas Dunn. He began his career as a minister as a preacher on the Eastern Shore of Maryland. In 1830 ,he was appointed minister of two Methodist Churches in Baltimore. He was involved in the formal organization of the Methodist Protestant Church in 1830. In 1837. Stockton compiled a hymnbook.

He was minister at the Methodist Church in Georgetown in Washington, D.C., where he served as the chaplain in the U.S. House of Representatives. He then served from 1838 to 1847 as a minister in Philadelphia and as a minister in Cincinnati, Ohio. In 1850, Stockton attempted to set up an independent, non-denomination church. He was elected president of Miami University, but declined the appointment.

In 1850, Stockton returned to Baltimore and the Methodist Protestants.

Stockton gave the opening prayer at the consecration of the National Cemetery Gettysburg, the ceremony during which Abraham Lincoln later gave the Gettysburg Address.

Stockton is buried in Section 7, Lot 58, in Mount Moriah Cemetery in Philadelphia.

== Works ==
- The Book Above All - The Holy Bible the Only Sensible, Infallible and Divine Authority on Earth (1871)

== Sources ==
- Library of Congress prints and photos section
- Mount Moriah Cemetery bio of Stockton
- Ancel Henry Bassett. A Concise History of the Methodist Protestant Church From its Origin. Pittsburgh: Press of Charles A Scot, 1877.

Religious titles
Preceded by William H. Hammett	23rd US House Chaplain; December 9, 1833 – December 10, 1834	Succeeded by Edward Dunlap Smith
Preceded by Edward Dunlap Smith	25th US House Chaplain; December 24, 1835 – December 20, 1836	Succeeded by Oliver C. Comstock
Preceded by None	43rd US House Chaplain; July 4, 1861 – December 7, 1863	Succeeded by William Henry Channing
