= Rajan Zed prayer protest =

U.S. Congress protest

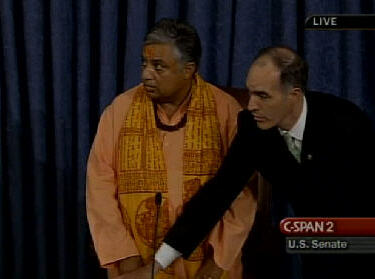
- Senator Bob Casey Jr. as Presiding Officer of the Senate directs that "The Sergeant-at-Arms will restore order in the Senate" as Christian protestors interrupt Guest Chaplain Rajan Zed
- Date: July 12, 2007
- Location: United States Senate

The Rajan Zed prayer protest were events surrounding the first official offering of a Hindu prayer at the United States Senate.

On July 12, 2007, Rajan Zed, a Hindu cleric and a leader in Interfaith Relations from the Indian Association of Northern Nevada based in Reno, appeared at the United States Senate as its guest Chaplain.

== Prelude to the protest ==
Rajan Zed, an Indian immigrant and American citizen, had served as guest Chaplain for the Nevada State Senate and Assembly and delivered the first Hindu prayer there (on March 19 and May 7, 2007). The American Family Association called on its members to contact their senators to complain about a non-monotheistic prayer being offered in the Senate.

== Prayer and protest ==
At the Senate chambers on July 12, 2007 Rajan Zed (wearing the traditional sandalpaste tilak on his forehead, a rudraksha mala, and saffron-colored clothing) approached the podium. He was prepared to give the first official Hindu prayer ever offered at the Senate as a guest chaplain upon the request of Senate Majority Leader Harry Reid of Nevada. This would also open the day's proceedings (which were largely centered around the Iraq war).

The prayer was interrupted by three Christian protesters who were arrested by the United States Capitol Police and charged with a misdemeanor for disrupting Congress.

== State legislatures ==
Soon after the protest at the U.S. Senate Rajan Zed served as guest chaplain offering a Hindu prayer before the California State Senate. Zed delivered the prayer without incident on August 27, 2007 with the appreciation of State Senator Elaine Alquist and the official State Senate Chaplain, Reverend James Richardson, an Episcopal priest. There was no complaints over the prayer from California's Conservative Christian Community, and the Reverend Louis Sheldon, who founded the state's Traditional Values Coalition declared "I don't see any problem with it at all. I would have no problems with a Hindu praying, just as I wouldn't an evangelical Christian." National groups continued in their opposition to Hindu legislative prayers with Wildmon speaking for the AFA stating "We're not opposed to the ability of people to worship their own gods or god, but when it comes to our civil government...it's always been the recognition of the God of the Bible. Every religion is not equal. That's my belief. That's logic." California's Chief Sergeant-at-Arms for the state Senate said that extra security precautions had been taken in case of protests against Zed's prayer.

Seeking to promote understanding of Hinduism and "emphasizes the multicultural and religious freedom aspect of this country" throughout the end of 2007 and into 2008 Zed made requests and was granted a guest chaplaincy to recite Hindu prayers at state legislatures in New Mexico, Colorado, Utah, Washington, Oregon and Arizona.

== Calls for candidates to denounce ==
As the 2008 presidential election approached, American Hindu organizations urged presidential candidates to denounce the protestors. The executive director of the Hindu American Foundation, Ishani Chowdhury, stated "if you look at it as a reflection of a larger number of people... we need people to condemn what happened and highlight the need for dialogue".

== Zed's later legislative invocations and the 2015 Idaho prayer boycott ==
Since the 2007 protest Rajan Zed offered Hindu opening prayers in various State Senates and State Assemblies/Houses-of-Representatives and at various County Commissions/Boards and City Councils across the United States. On June 19, 2014 he offered the opening prayer as a guest chaplain at the United States House of Representatives. These events occurred without any notable public controversy.

In March 2015 Rajan Zed was the focus of another protest of legislators over his leading a legislative invocation at the Idaho State Senate. Senator Steve Vick, with reported support from his constituents, tried to prevent Zed from offering the prayer. Failing to prevent the prayer, Vick and two other Republican state senators refused to enter the chamber until Zed had finished. Vick held that having a Hindu invocation would "send a message we're not happy with the way America is" and held that people under Hinduism "have a caste system. They worship cows." Joining in the boycott of the prayer was Senator Sheryl Nuxoll who stated "Hindu is a false faith with false gods. I think it's great that Hindu people can practice their religion, but since we're the Senate, we're setting an example of what we, Idaho, believe." Senator Lori Den Hartog joined the boycott holding it would be disingenuous to her Christian faith to attend and "It was a personal decision, I didn't want to announce it prior to the event." Zed's prayer as guest chaplain was in English and Sanskrit focusing on selflessness and peace.

== See also ==
- Chaplain of the United States Senate
- Venkatachalapathi Samuldrala prayer controversy
