= Burgiss Allison =

American Baptist minister (1753–1827)

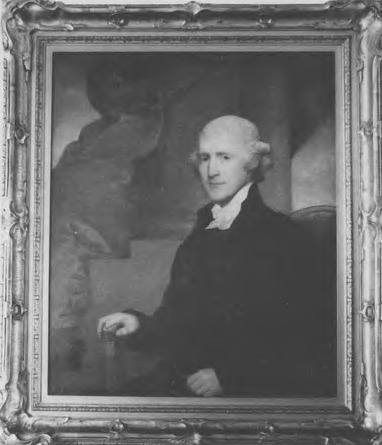
- portrait by Gilbert Stuart
- Born: 1753; Bordentown
- Died: 20 February 1827 (aged 73–74); Washington, D.C.
- Alma mater: Brown University
- Occupation: Minister, educator
- Awards: Master of Arts (1879, college of Rhode Island, Brown University)

Burgiss Allison (1753–1827) was the Chaplain of the United States House of Representatives from 1816 to 1820 and a trustee of what is now George Washington University from 1821 to 1826.

Allison was born in Bordentown, New Jersey. He studied at Brown University. He became a Baptist minister. He also worked on developing improvements to the steam engine.

Allison also wrote a dictionary, The American Standard of Orthography and Pronunciation, and Improved Dictionary of the English Language, Abridged for the Use of Schools (1815). He was elected to the American Philosophical Society in 1789.

Religious titles
Preceded by Spencer Houghton Cone	Chaplain of the United States House of Representatives; December 5, 1816 – November 16, 1820	Succeeded by John Nicholson Campbell
