= William H. Hammett =

American politician

William Henry Hammett (March 25, 1799 – July 9, 1861) was an American clergyman and politician who served one term as a U.S. representative from Mississippi from 1843 to 1845.

== Biography ==
Born in Dunmanway, County Cork, Ireland, Hammett studied theology. He was chaplain of the University of Virginia at Charlottesville 1832–1834 and of the Virginia House of delegates.

=== Congress ===
Hammett was elected as a Democrat to the Twenty-eighth Congress (March 4, 1843 – March 3, 1845).

=== Death ===
He died July 9, 1861, in Washington County, Mississippi at the age of 62.

Religious titles
Preceded by Reuben Post	22nd US House Chaplain; December 12, 1832 – December 9, 1833	Succeeded by Thomas H. Stockton
U.S. House of Representatives
Preceded by William M. Gwin	Member of the U.S. House of Representatives from Mississippi's at-large congressional district 1843 – 1845	Succeeded by Stephen Adams
