= Henry Couden =

American minister (1842–1922)

Henry Noble Couden
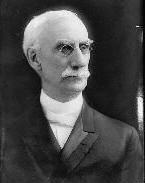
- Born: November 21, 1842; Plymouth, Indiana, US
- Died: August 22, 1922 (aged 79); Fort Myer, Virginia, US
- Resting place: Arlington National Cemetery
- Education: St. Lawrence University
- Occupation: Chaplain of the U.S. House of Representatives
- Spouses: Lydia Jane Dickinson; Harriet Dunbar
- Children: 2

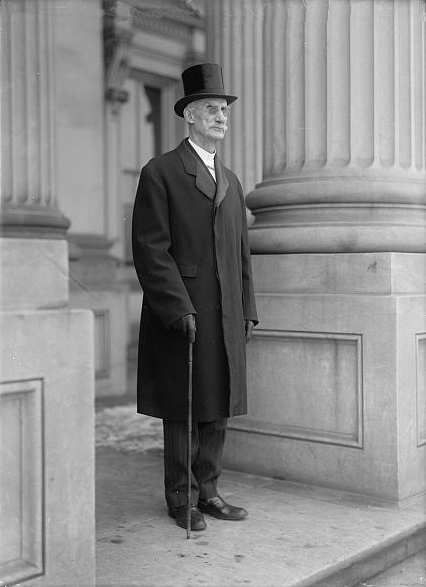
Henry N. Couden

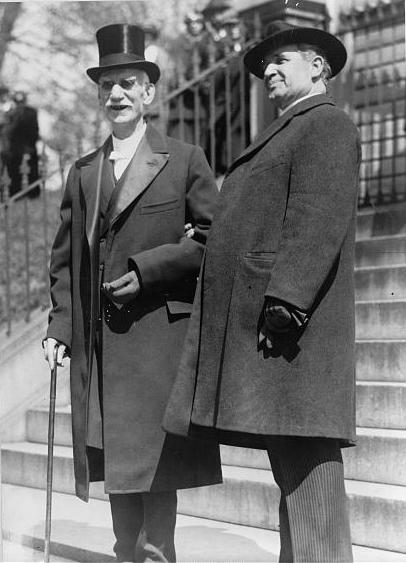
Former House Chaplains James Shera Montgomery and Henry N. Couden

Henry Noble Couden (November 21, 1842 – August 22, 1922) was a Universalist minister who was the 54th Chaplain of the United States House of Representatives from December 2, 1895, to February 21, 1921. He was the second blind religious leader to serve in this position, the other is William Henry Milburn.

== Birth ==
He was born on November 21, 1842, in Plymouth, Indiana, the nephew of Noah Noble, governor of Indiana.

== Civil War ==
Days after the outbreak of the American Civil War, on 16 April 1861, he enlisted in the 6th Regiment, Ohio Volunteer Infantry, serving in Company K, with the rank of corporal upon entering and the rank of sergeant upon leaving. He was also a corporal in Company D, 1st Cavalry Battalion, Mississippi Marine Brigade. He was wounded at the Battle of Beaver Dam Lake on May 24, 1863, losing his sight. He described his activity during this battle in a 24 January 1903 letter to Warren D. Crandall, author of History of the Ram Fleet and Mississippi Marine Brigade.

== Education and ordination ==
He studied at the State School for the Blind in Columbus, Ohio, and the Divinity School of St. Lawrence University. He graduated from St. Lawrence in 1878 and was ordained to the Universalist ministry that same year.

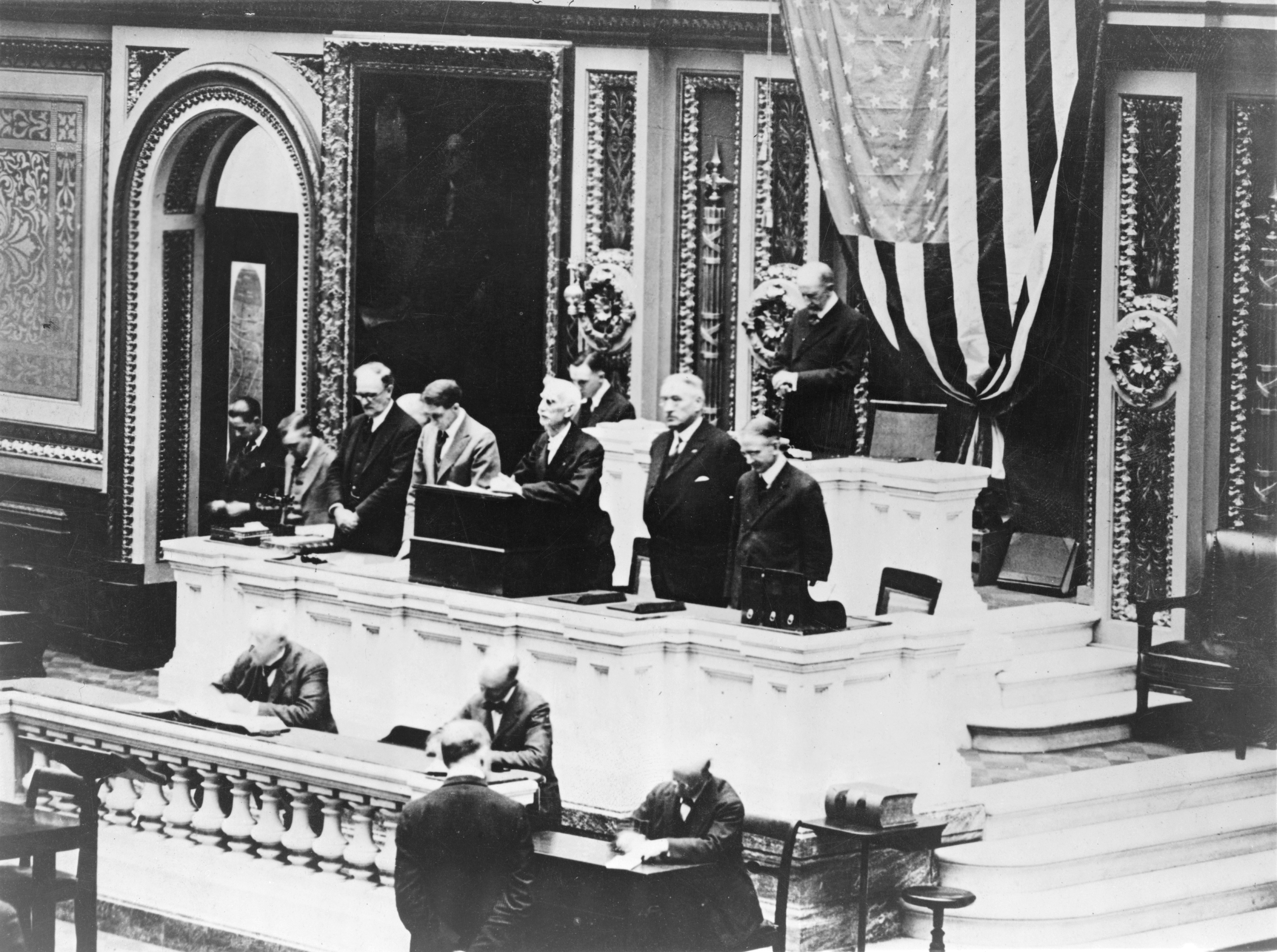
Offering prayer in Congress for the speedy recovery of President Woodrow Wilson, 1919

== Career ==
=== Universalist minister ===
After his ordination, he served churches in Madrid, New York; Willoughby, Ohio; Chatham, Massachusetts; and Port Huron, Michigan.

=== Chaplain of the U.S. House of Representatives ===
He became chaplain of the U.S. House of Representatives in 1895 and served in that post for 25 years, until February 21, 1921.

A collection of his daily opening prayers for the 62nd Congress was issued in 1913. In his foreword, Rep. Champ Clark praised Couden's "prayers of excellent character, in both form and matter ... full of piety, sympathy, and philanthropy ... voiced in choice English".

== Other service ==
He was a member of the board of directors of the Aid Association for the Blind of the District of Columbia. He served in post and departmental chaplaincies for the Grand Army of the Republic and as the chaplain for the Society of Marine Brigade Survivors.

== Death ==
He died on August 22, 1922, at his residence at Fort Myer, Virginia, of bronchial pneumonia, after a nine-month illness. He was buried at Arlington National Cemetery, in Arlington, Virginia. along with his second wife, Harriet Dunbar Couden, and one of his two sons, Henry N. Couden Jr.

Religious titles
Preceded by Edward B. Bagby	55th US House Chaplain; December 2, 1895 – February 21, 1921	Succeeded by James Shera Montgomery
