= Spencer Houghton Cone =

American clergyman

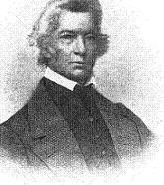
Spencer Houghton Cone

Spencer Houghton Cone (born April 13, 1785) was an American clergyman.

Cone was born on April 13, 1785, in Princeton, New Jersey. He entered Princeton University at the age of twelve, but two years later, because of his father’s illness, left his studies. At sixteen he was master in a school at Burlington. He then moved to Philadelphia. Finding his salary insufficient to support his family, he first studied law, but abandoned it and turned to the stage. This vocation did not especially appeal to him, and was strongly opposed by his devout mother who considered it not respectable. He first appeared in "Mahomet" in 1805 and subsequently was successful on the stage. But this profession was distasteful to him and he soon left it.

In 1812, he joined the Baltimore "American" newspaper as treasurer and bookkeeper. Soon afterward, in connection with his brother-in-law, John Norvell, he purchased and published the Baltimore "Whig." During the War of 1812, he was at the Battle of Bladensburg with Norvell and the account of this experience has been chronicled in "Some Account of the Life of Spencer Houghton Cone, A Baptist Preacher in America," published in New York in 1856.

He then became a clerk in the treasury department in Washington. After moving there, he began to preach with remarkable success. He was converted to the Baptist Church in 1814. In 1815-1816 he became Chaplain of the United States House of Representatives. About 1823, he moved to the Oliver street church, New York, where he remained for eighteen years. He then became pastor of the 1st Baptist church there. In 1832, he became president of the Baptist triennial convention, and was re-elected until 1841. From 1837 till 1850 he was president of the American and foreign Bible society. On the formation of the American Bible union, he was made its president, and so continued until his death on August 28, 1855.

At the zenith of his career he was probably the most popular and influential Baptist minister in the United States.

Religious titles
Preceded by Obadiah Bruen Brown	Chaplain of the United States House of Representatives; December 7, 1815 – December 5, 1816	Succeeded by Burgiss Allison
