= Bernard Braskamp =

American Presbyterian minister (1887-1966)

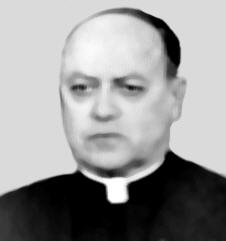
- The Rev. Bernard Braskamp

Personal life
- Born: February 18, 1887 Alton, Ohio, U.S.
- Died: February 22, 1966 (aged 79) Washington, D.C., U.S.
- Education: University of Michigan

Religious life
- Religion: Presbyterian
- Ordination: Presbyterian, 1911 (Ordained in Brooklyn)

Senior posting
- Previous post: 56th Chaplain, United States House of Representatives

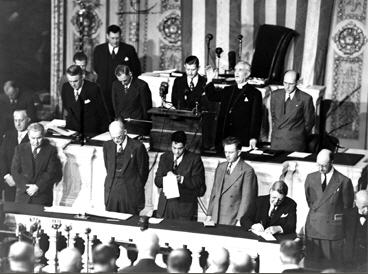
Chaplain Braskamp delivering the opening prayer for the 80th Congress, 1947

Bernard Braskamp (February 18, 1887 – February 22, 1966) was a Presbyterian minister who served as the 56th Chaplain of the United States House of Representatives, from 1950 until his death in 1966.

== Life and works ==
Braskamp, a Presbyterian minister, served as the 56th House Chaplain, January 3, 1950, until the time of his death in 1966. He was preceded by the Rev. James Shera Montgomery, a Methodist, and succeeded by the Rev. Edward G. Latch, also a Methodist.

Braskamp graduated from the University of Michigan in 1908 and the Theological School in Princeton, New Jersey in 1911. He was ordained a Presbyterian minister in 1911, beginning his ministry as Assistant Minister at the Church of the Covenant (which later became known as the National Presbyterian Church).

In 1955, he served on the advisory committee that helped create the U.S. Capitol Congressional Prayer Room.

During his time working with the House of Representatives, Braskamp's many prayers included the one that opened the session that passed the historic Civil Rights Act of 1964 The NY Times reported that "The air of a great occasion hung over the chamber from the moment that Chaplain Bernard Braskamp began his prayer with the quotation from Leviticus engraved on the Liberty Bell: "Proclaim liberty throughout all the land unto all the inhabitants thereof."

Prior to his official appointment as Chaplain of the House of Representatives in 1950 he served in that position as Acting Chaplain for three years.

Braskamp died in his Washington, D.C., home on February 22, 1966, of a stroke.

Religious titles
Preceded by James Shera Montgomery	57th US House Chaplain; January 3, 1950 – February 22, 1966	Succeeded by Edward G. Latch
