= James Shera Montgomery =

American Methodist minister

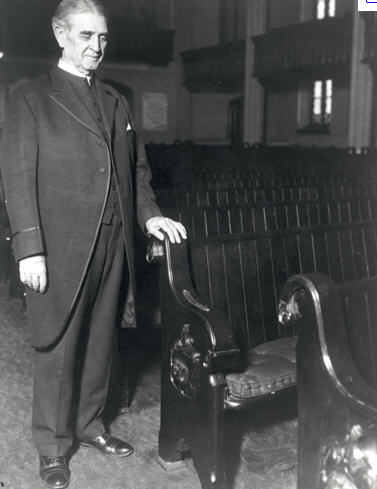
The Rev. James Shera Montgomery

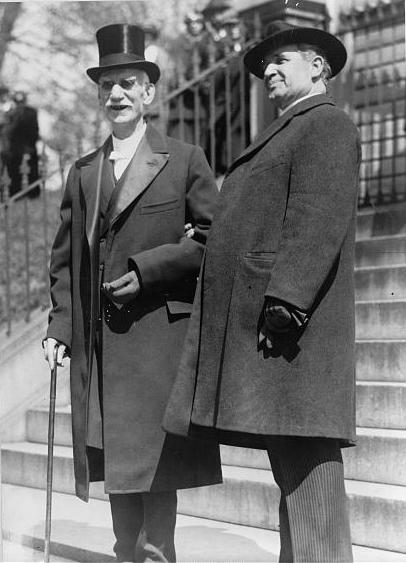
Former House Chaplains James Shera Montgomery and Henry N. Couden

James Shera Montgomery (17 October 1862 – 30 June 1952) was an American Methodist minister who served as the 55th Chaplain of the United States House of Representatives, April 11, 1921 - January 3, 1950.

== Life and works ==
Montgomery served as House Chaplain for 29 years. During that time he participated in many events, including the delivery of the invocation at the special joint session to honor the memory of President Franklin Delano Roosevelt on July 1, 1946. The House had introduced legislation for a joint session with the Senate (H. Con Res. 152) on May 23, 1946, with the Senate's concurrence filed on June 1, 1946. The historic session "included dignitaries from around the world as well as prominent figures in the U.S. government." The rostrum was covered in greens, and Robert Merrill of the Metropolitan Opera performed two solos in Roosevelt's memory.

Religious titles
Preceded by Henry N. Couden	56th US House Chaplain; April 11, 1921 – January 3, 1950	Succeeded by Bernard Braskamp
