= Edward Dunlap Smith =

Edward Dunlap Smith (1807 – March 28, 1883) was a Presbyterian clergyman and served as Chaplain of the United States House of Representatives (1834–1835).

== Early life ==
Edward Dunlap Smith was born in Philadelphia, Pennsylvania, the son of a prominent ironmaster. He was a graduate of Princeton University, the University of Virginia and Princeton Theological Seminary.

== Ministry ==
Smith served a Presbyterian church in Washington, D.C., before moving to New York City's Old Chelsea Presbyterian Church (West 22nd Street) in 1838 and preached there for 30 years before retiring.

== Chaplain of the House of Representatives ==
On December 1, 1834, Rev. Edward Dunlap Smith was appointed chaplain of the United States House of Representatives.

== Personal life ==
Smith met his wife Jane Blair Cary, daughter Virginia Randolph and Wilson Jefferson Cary, while a student at the University of Virginia. The Smiths were the parents of four sons, including, Archibald Cary Smith the celebrated marine architect, and two daughters.

Religious titles
| Preceded by Thomas H. Stockton | 24th US House Chaplain; December 10, 1834 – December 24, 1835 | Succeeded by Thomas H. Stockton |
