= Henry Bidleman Bascom =

American bishop (1796–1850)

The Right Reverend Henry Bidleman Bascom
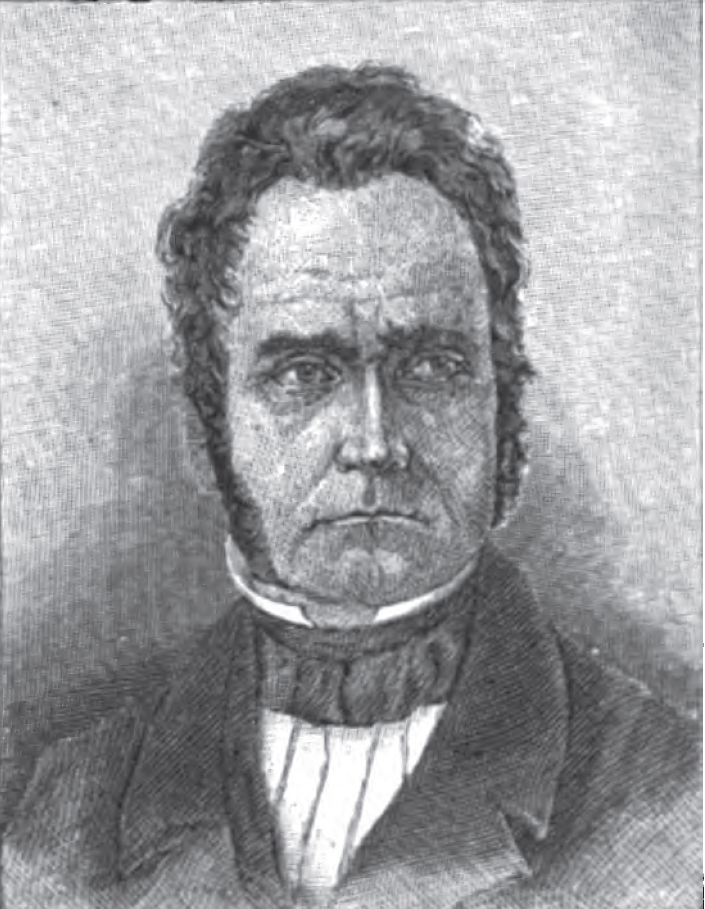

Bishop of the Methodist Episcopal Church, South
- In office May 1850 – September 8, 1850

President of Transylvania University
- In office 1842–1849
- Preceded by: Robert Morrison
- Succeeded by: H. B. Shannon

President of Madison College
- In office March 1827 – 1829
- Preceded by: Position established
- Succeeded by: John H. Fielding

18th Chaplain of the United States House of Representatives
- In office December 8, 1823 – December 5, 1825
- Preceded by: John Brakenridge
- Succeeded by: Reuben Post

Personal details
- Born: May 27, 1796 Hancock, New York, U.S.
- Died: September 8, 1850 (aged 54) Louisville, Kentucky, U.S.
- Resting place: Eastern Cemetery; Louisville, Kentucky, U.S.
- Spouse: Eliza Van Antwerp (m. 1839)
- Children: 2
- Occupation: Clergyman, academic administrator

Henry Bidleman Bascom (1796–1850) was an American Bishop of the Methodist Episcopal Church, South, elected in 1850. He also distinguished himself as a circuit rider, pastor and Christian preacher; as chaplain to the U.S. House of Representatives; and as an editor, a college academic, and a denominational leader.

== Early life and education ==
Of French Huguenot and Basque ancestry, Henry Bidleman Bascom was born 27 May 1796 in Hancock, Delaware County, New York. He was a descendant of Thomas Bascom, who came to the Massachusetts Bay Colony in 1634 and who later founded Windsor, Connecticut. The name Bidleman came from the family of Henry's maternal grandmother, Rosanna Bidleman.

Henry Bascom joined the Methodist Episcopal Church in western Pennsylvania in 1811 after his family migrated to the frontier area.

== Marriage and family ==
Bascom married Eliza Van Antwerp on 7 March 1839 in New York City.

== Ministry ==
At a time of expansion of the Methodist Church on the frontier during the Second Great Awakening, new men were accepted into preaching. Although with little formal education, Bascom was found to be a good speaker with knowledge of the Bible; he was licensed to preach in 1813 at the age of seventeen and was received on trial by the Ohio Annual Conference of the Methodist Episcopal Church. Rev. Bascom worked hard as a frontier circuit rider, traveling to scattered settlements across a wide territory. For example, one year he preached 400 times, receiving a salary of $12.10. He soon became noted as a pulpit orator.

His style was considered too florid to suit many in Ohio, so in 1816 he was transferred to Tennessee. He served appointments there and in Kentucky until 1822, when he returned to Ohio.

The Rev. Henry Bidleman Bascom was awarded the honorary degree Doctor of Divinity.

== Bascom as pulpit orator ==
The Bishop Matthew Simpson, in his Cyclopaedia of Methodism (1880), wrote about Rev. Henry Bidleman Bascom's pulpit ministry:

"At one point, he was perhaps the most popular pulpit orator in the United States. His sermons, though long, did not weary the people. They were evidently prepared with great care. As is often the case, in reading his sermons we miss the brilliancy and vivacity of the living speaker. He was a man of remarkably fine personal appearance, and had a voice of great compass and power."

== Congressional chaplain ==
In 1823 the Congressman Henry Clay from Kentucky, then Speaker of the House, obtained for Bascom the appointment of Chaplain of the U.S. House of Representatives, where he served 1824–26. At one time Bascom visited Baltimore, where his fervid oratory made a great sensation. He was known as a powerful speaker, fond of strong epithets and extravagant metaphors.

== Academic and editorial ministry ==
Rev. Bascom was selected as the first president of Madison College, Uniontown, Pennsylvania (1827–29). He became an agent of the American Colonization Society (1829–31), working to help resettle American free blacks in Liberia, Africa.

In 1832 Bascom was hired as professor of moral science and belles-lettres at Augusta College, an early Methodist school in Kentucky. He taught there until 1842.

Rev. Bascom was selected as president of Transylvania University in Lexington, Kentucky (1842–49; he had declined two other offers).

From 1846 until 1850, Rev. Bascom edited the Southern Methodist Quarterly Review. He was a delegate to every M.E. General Conference from 1828 until 1844.

== Methodist schism ==
Rev. Bascom played an important role at the M.E. General Conference of 1844, when the denomination divided over the question of slavery. The Church suspended Bishop James Osgood Andrew because he refused to manumit his slaves.

Dr. Bascom wrote the "protest of the minority" of the Southern members against this action by the majority, which became known as the denomination split. He was a member of the convention held the next year at Louisville, at which the M.E. Church, South, was organized. Bascom wrote its report.

Bascom was selected as chairman of the commission appointed to settle the differences between the two branches of the Church, but it did not reunite until 1939, long after the end of the American Civil War. He published a book in defense of the Southern church, entitled Methodism and Slavery; with Other Matters in Controversy between the North and the South; Being a Review of the Manifesto of the Majority, in Reply to the Protest of the Minority, of the Late General Conference of the Methodist E. Church, in the Case of Bishop Andrew (1845; available free on line at Google Books).

== Elected bishop ==
Bascom was elected to the episcopacy by the General Conference of the Methodist Episcopal Church, South in 1850 at St. Louis. He was consecrated a Bishop in May 1850, a few months before his death.

== Death and burial ==
Bishop Bascom died 8 September 1850 in Louisville, Kentucky.

The communities of Bascom, Florida, and Bascom, Texas, were named in his honor.

== Selected writings ==
- Methodism and Slavery(1845), free e-text available
- Sermons from the Pulpit
- Lectures on Infidelity
- Lectures on Moral and Mental Science
- His collected works (4 volumes) were edited by Rev. T.N. Ralston and printed at Nashville (1850 and 1856).

== Biographies ==
- Henkle, M.M., Life of Bishop Bascom, Nashville, 1854.

== See also ==
- List of bishops of the United Methodist Church

== Notes ==
Religious titles
Preceded by John Brackenridge, D.D.	Chaplain of the United States House of Representatives; December 8, 1823 – December 6, 1824	Succeeded by Reuben Post
