= Jesse Lee Church =

Historic church in Maine, United States

- U.S. National Register of Historic Places
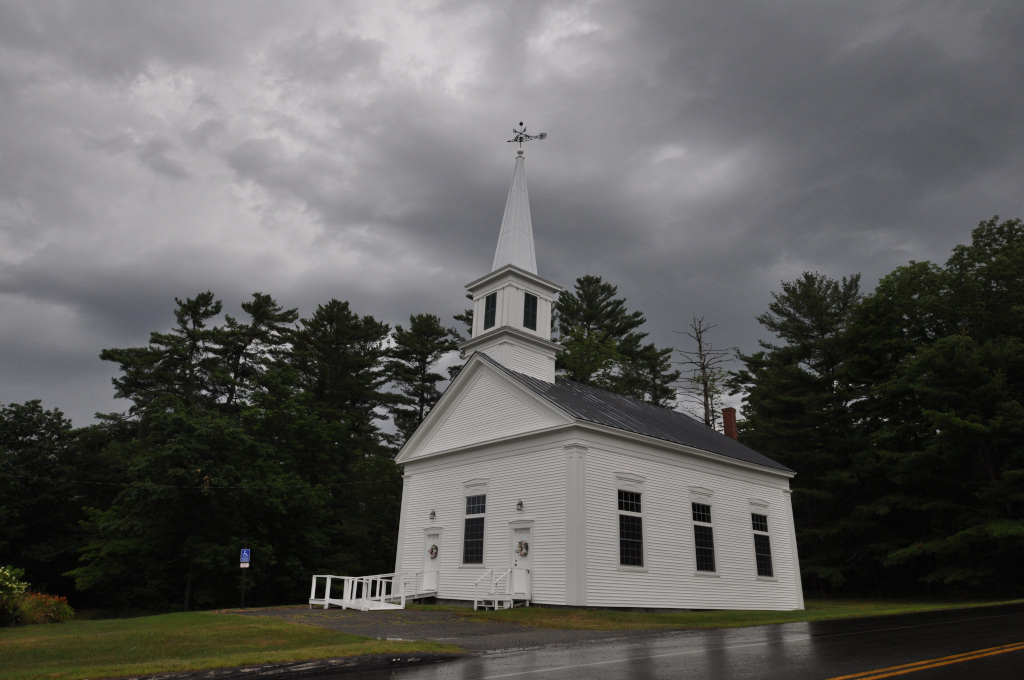

- Location within Maine Location within the United States
- Location: ME 17 at Plains Rd., Readfield, Maine
- Coordinates: 44°21′44″N 69°54′44″W
- Area: 0.5 acres (0.20 ha)
- Built: 1795
- Architectural style: Greek Revival
- NRHP reference No.: 84001378
- Added to NRHP: July 19, 1984

The Jesse Lee Church is a historic church at Maine State Route 27 and Plains Road in Readfield, Maine. Built in 1795 through the missionary work of Jesse Lee, it is the oldest surviving Methodist church in the state of Maine. It is still used seasonally for services, organized by the Readfield United Methodist Church. It was listed on the National Register of Historic Places in 1984.

== Description and history ==
The Jesse Lee Church stands in a rural area of eastern Readfield, at the northwest corner of Plains Road and Main Street (State Routes 17 and 135). It is a modest single-story wood frame structure, with a gabled rood and clapboard siding. A square tower with belfry and steeple rises from the roof ridge. The front facade has a pair of entrances, one on each side of a central sash window. The gable above is fully pedimented. The building corners have paneled pilasters rising to an entablature, and the square elements of the tower are also pilastered.

The church was built in 1795 by the local community, after Jesse Lee, a charismatic Methodist minister from Virginia, preached to them. The building was original located further up the hill to its rear; it was moved in 1825 to its present location, at which time its Greek Revival stylisting elements were added. The building continues to be used periodically for Methodist religious services.

== See also ==
- National Register of Historic Places listings in Kennebec County, Maine
