= Ralph Randolph Gurley =

American clergyman (1797–1872)

- Born: May 26, 1797; Lebanon, Connecticut, U.S.
- Died: July 30, 1872 (aged 75)
- Education: Yale College
- Occupation: Clergyman

Ralph Randolph Gurley (May 26, 1797 – July 30, 1872) was an American clergyman, an advocate of the separation of the races, and a major force for 50 years in the American Colonization Society. It offered passage to free black Americans to the ACS colony in west Africa. It bought land from chiefs of the indigenous Africans. Because of his influence in fundraising and education about the ACS, Gurley is considered one of the founders of Liberia, which he named.

== Biography ==
Gurley was born in Lebanon, Connecticut, and gained an early education. He graduated from Yale College, B.A. in 1818. He moved to Washington, D.C., where he was licensed to preach as a Presbyterian.

On May 25, 1827, he married Eliza McLellan (1810?-1872). – (Note: different spelling in Gurley source – Eliza McLellen (1812–1872, uncertain). They had a large family, including William Henry Fitzhugh (1820) (this seems questionable as this birth was seven years before the couple married), Felicia Liberia Heneaus (1829), Ralph Randolph (1832–1833), Eliza (1834), Julia (1835), Mary Custis (1836), Ralph Randolph Gurley (b. 1841), Archibald Alexander (1841), Marion Ann Muirhead (1844), John McDonough "Mackie" (1846), and Caroline Rose Gurley (1847-died in infancy).

From 1822, Gurley began to work with the American Colonization Society. Although he was never ordained as a minister, Gurley was also appointed to serve as Chaplain of the United States House of Representatives for the 21st and 22nd Congresses (1829–1833), and again for the 30th and 31st (1847–1851), opening each day's proceedings with a prayer.

== American Colonization Society ==
Starting as a young man of about 25, Gurley acted as the agent and secretary of the American Colonization Society from 1822, soon after its founding, until 1872. By that time the West African colony founded by the Society had declared independence in 1847 as the Republic of Liberia.

The ACS was founded as an uneasy alliance of abolitionists and slaveholders. Members of each group were seeking solutions to the place of free people of color or free blacks in United States society. Together members of this group proposed to relocate free American blacks to a new colony in West Africa. Chapters of the ACS were set up in several southern states, some of which initially funded their own relocation efforts to property they purchased in contiguous parcels along the African coast. Eventually they allowed it to be absorbed into the larger ACS enterprise.

While some ACS members referred to this transportation of blacks as "repatriation", by this time most blacks in America, including slaves, were native born. Most free blacks, some of whom had achieved freedom before the Revolution, wanted to gain equal civil rights in the nation they regarded as their own. But over time, the ACS did attract some black pioneers willing to settle in West Africa.

Because of continued discrimination against free blacks in American society, and especially among the slave societies of the South, where they were thought to threaten the stability of the slave regimes, even some abolitionists believed that free American blacks and newly manumitted slaves might be better off founding their own society in West Africa, with the eventual goal of self-government. Such members believed that if alternative settlement for free blacks were available, with financial support by the ACS, more slaveholders might be encouraged to manumit their slaves. After Nat Turner's Rebellion of 1831, most Southern states repealed the already limited rights of free blacks and free people of color, and strengthened laws meant to control them through banning education, worship without white ministers, and group assemblies, for instance. Manumissions were sharply limited, generally available only by individual act of the state legislatures for each person to be freed. This procedure was so difficult that few slaveholders pursued freeing their slaves.

During the first ten years of Gurley's agency, the annual income of the society increased from $778 to $40,000. He traveled widely to deliver addresses in its behalf, as it needed funds to support the ships and relocation expenses of new settlers to Monrovia. He is considered one of the founders of Liberia, which he named.

Gurley also edited the public-relations organ of the ACS, the African Repository and Colonial Journal. He sailed to England to solicit aid in the work of colonization. As in the British effort, American missionaries accompanied the settlers to the major settlement, Monrovia, in order to aid in converting the indigenous Africans they encountered. He continued to express the highest motives for the project, even after Liberia gained independence from the ACA:

"How should Virginians universally rejoice in the great evidences of Civilization growing & expanding on the west coast of Africa, through civilized Africans sent forth from their homes!" (letter, November 4, 1857)

The British had earlier established their own colony in West Africa, at Freetown (now the capital of Sierra Leone), for resettlement of blacks from London, Nova Scotia (Black Loyalists had been settled there from the American colonies after the Revolutionary War), and Jamaican Maroons. In time, the British also resettled here captives who had been liberated from illegal slave ships after the banning of the Atlantic slave trade.

Former President James Madison was among prominent American slaveholders who supported the work of the ACS. He bequeathed $2000 (~$3,548 in 2025) in his will through Gurley to the Society.

Gurley visited Africa three times: in 1824 for the ACS, in order to resolve a dispute between the settlers and the appointed governor, Jehudi Ashmun; in 1849 representing the US government, in order to report to it on the newly independent republic; and late in life, in 1868, on an independent trip on an ACS ship in a desire to see Liberia again, his life's work.

Gurley also wrote a biography, Life of Jehudi Ashmun (1835), about the secretary of the Society who served as an early governor of the colony. He reported his Mission to England for the American Colonization Society (1841), and wrote an encomium, the Life and Eloquence of Reverend Sylvester Larned (1844).

In his biography of Ashmun (1835), Gurley wrote

The friends of African Colonization have thought, that the consent of the South was indispensable for the safe abolition of slavery; that the work should be done with caution and preparation; that circumstances and consequences should be regarded; that a separation of races so distinct as the coloured and white in complexion, habits and condition is desirable for the happiness of both.

Religious titles
Preceded by Reuben Post	Chaplain of the United States House of Representatives; December 6, 1830 – December 5, 1831	Succeeded by Reuben Post
Preceded by William T.S. Sprole	Chaplain of the United States House of Representatives; December 6, 1847 – December 1, 1851	Succeeded by Lyttleton Morgan
