= William Dickinson Hawley =

American Episcopal clergyman

William Dickinson Hawley (1784 – January 23, 1845) was an Episcopal clergyman who served as Chaplain of the Senate.

== Early years ==
Dickinson Hawley was born in 1784 in Manchester, Vermont, the fifth child of Jabez Hawley and Phoebe Peet. He first studied for the law under Judge Peter Radcliffe in New York City. While in New York he also served in the state militia and was court martialed in 1813 for unofficerlike conduct; he was acquitted of the charges against him. General Bogardus was outraged at the acquittal. Hawley was permitted to resign his commission and thereafter studied for the ministry.

== Ministry ==
He was ordained a deacon on November 4, 1814 by New York Bishop James Hobart. His first charge was St. Stephen parish, Culpeper County, Virginia; he was ordained a priest in May 1815 by Bishop of Virginia Richard Channing Moore.

He was called to serve St. John's Episcopal Church, Lafayette Square (Washington, D.C.), also known as The Church of the Presidents. He was essentially the church's first rector. When invited to serve it was for "six or twelve months" on a trial basis. He in fact served as rector from 1817 to 1845. Hawley was a friend of Andrew Jackson and Martin Van Buren. The church's Presidential pew was set apart for that use in December 1817, it was occupied by every president thereafter through Buchanan. In Hawley's rectorship, Presidential worshipers included President John Quincy Adams who was a regular at afternoon services during his term of office. Hawley conducted the funeral of President William Henry Harrison in the East Room of the White House on April 7, 1841. His successor John Tyler was an Episcopalian who, with his family, became regular worshipers at St John's Church. Hawley officiated in the White House for the weddings of Samuel L. Gouverneur to Maria Hester Monroe (the President's youngest daughter) and John Adams II to Mary Catherine Hellen.

Hawley was among those responsible for the establishment of the new Protestant Episcopal Theological Seminary in Fairfax, Virginia.

Following his death on January 23, 1845, Hawley's remains were buried outside the north wall of the church; the grave was left undisturbed during expansions in 1883, which made the gravesite now within the church.

== Personal life ==
On August 25, 1818, at Christ Church, Alexandria, Virginia, Hawley married Wilhelmina Douglass Potts, daughter of John and Eliza Ramsey Potts. Their nine children were: Elizabeth Potts, Phoebe Mary, Thomas Semmes, Wilhelmina, Catherine Ramsay, Peter William Radcliffe, Fanny Lear, Anna Sophia and William H. Hawley.

Religious titles
Preceded by Sereno Edwards Dwight	Chaplain of the United States Senate; December 9, 1817 – November 18, 1818	Succeeded by John Clark
