= John Clark (chaplain) =

John Flavel Clark (December 10, 1784 – October 7, 1853) was a Presbyterian clergyman who served as Chaplain of the United States Senate.

== Early years ==
John Flavel Clark was born on December 10, 1784, in Allentown, New Jersey, the oldest of three sons of Margaret Imlay Clark and Dr. Joseph Clark who was pastor of First Presbyterian Church of New Brunswick, New Jersey (1796–1813). Joseph Clark also served on George Washington's general staff during the Revolutionary War. John F. Clark graduated valedictorian from Princeton University in 1807. After graduation he was engaged in teaching in Georgia. He began studying for the ministry at Andover Theological Seminary in 1810. There he became acquainted with Adoniram Judson, Samuel Newell and Samuel John Mills, thus beginning a lifelong commitment to the cause of foreign missions. He was one of the founders of the American Board of Commissioners for Foreign Missions.

He was chosen to be a tutor at Princeton, where he continued his divinity studies under its president Ashbel Green. He was called to be stated supply at First Presbyterian Church Flemington, New Jersey, and then to be its pastor, resulting in his ordination in June 1815.

== Ministry ==
He became stated supply for the First English Presbyterian Church of Amwell, New Jersey, in 1820—he would pastor both that congregation and the Flemington Church until 1836. He was elected Chaplain of the Senate on November 18, 1818; this was the 15th United States Congress, meeting in the Old Brick Capitol in Washington. Thereafter, Clark served as pastor of these Presbyterian churches in succession: Paterson, New Jersey (1837–1841), Cold Spring, New York (1841–1845), Oyster Bay, New York (1845–1846), and Fishkill, New York (1847 until his death).

Clark died on October 7, 1853, in his sixty-ninth year.

== Personal life ==
Clark married Mary Sherrerd, daughter of Samuel and Ann (Maxwell) Sherrerd of Pleasant Valley. Their children were: Anna Sherrerd Clark, Margaret Imlay Clark Elizabeth May Clark, Joseph C. Clark, Samuel Sherrerd Clark, and Sarah Browne Clark. Mary Sherrerd Clark died 8 August 1837, Clark married a second time, his second wife's name was Petrina.

Religious titles
Preceded by William Dickinson Hawley	Chaplain of the United States Senate; November 19, 1818 – December 8, 1819	Succeeded by Reuben Post
