= Stephen Adams (politician) =

American politician (1807–1857)

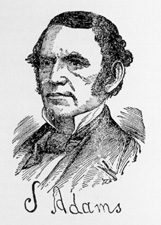

United States Senator from Mississippi
- In office March 17, 1852 – March 3, 1857
- Preceded by: John J. McRae
- Succeeded by: Jefferson Davis

Member of the U.S. House of Representatives from Mississippi's at-large district
- In office March 4, 1845 – March 3, 1847
- Preceded by: William H. Hammett
- Succeeded by: no at-large seat

Member of the Mississippi House of Representatives
- In office 1850

Personal details
- Born: October 17, 1807 Pendleton, South Carolina, United States
- Died: May 11, 1857 (aged 49) Memphis, Tennessee, United States
- Resting place: Elmwood Cemetery
- Party: Democratic

Stephen Adams (October 17, 1807 – May 11, 1857) was an American clergyman, lawyer and politician who served as a United States representative (1845 to 1847) and senator (1852 to 1857) from Mississippi.

== Early years ==
Adams was born on October 17, 1807, in Pendleton, South Carolina, the son of Baptist clergyman David Adams. he moved with his parents to Franklin County, Tennessee in 1812. He attended the public schools, studied law, was admitted to the bar in 1829, practiced in Franklin County. He was an slaveowner.

== Career ==
Adams was a member of the Tennessee Senate from 1833 to 1834, when he removed to Aberdeen, Mississippi and commenced the practice of law. He was circuit court judge from 1837 to 1846, and was elected as a Democratic representative to the Twenty-ninth Congress, serving from March 4, 1845, to March 3, 1847. He again became a judge of the circuit court in 1848, was a member of the Mississippi House of Representatives in 1850, and was a delegate to the State constitutional convention in 1851.

=== Senate ===
Adams was elected to the U.S. Senate on February 19, 1852, to fill the vacancy caused by the resignation of Jefferson Davis and served from March 17, 1852 to March 3, 1857; while in the Senate he was chairman of the Committee on Retrenchment (Thirty-third and Thirty-fourth Congresses).

== Last years ==
At the close of his term, Adams removed to Memphis, Tennessee and resumed the practice of law until he died there of smallpox on May 11, 1857, and was interred in Elmwood Cemetery.

== Sources ==
- United States Congress. "Stephen Adams (id: A000048)". Biographical Directory of the United States Congress.

U.S. House of Representatives
Preceded by William H. Hammett	Member of the U.S. House of Representatives from Mississippi's at-large congressional district 1845 – 1847	Succeeded by no at-large seat
U.S. Senate
Preceded by John J. McRae	U.S. senator (Class 1) from Mississippi; March 17, 1852 – March 3, 1857; Served alongside: Walker Brooke and Albert G. Brown	Succeeded by Jefferson Davis
