= James D. Ford =

American clergyman (~1930-2001)

Rev. Dr. James Ford
- Born: 1930 or 1931; Sioux Falls, South Dakota, US
- Died: 27 August 2001 (age 70); Washington, D.C., US
- Occupation: Clergyman
- Known for: 58th Chaplain of the United States House of Representatives
- James D. Ford's voice Ford opens a House session with a prayer Recorded July 26, 1999

James David Ford (né Anderson; c. 1930 – 27 August 2001) was an American clergyman, most known for being the youngest chaplain of a US military academy and as the Chaplain of the United States House of Representatives. While Chaplain of the House, he was the first-full time chaplain, second Lutheran to hold the role, and second-longest ever serving.

== Early life ==
James Anderson was born in Sioux Falls, South Dakota, and primarily grew up in Minnesota. Due to the commonality of the name Anderson, James gave himself the last name of Ford as the Ford Motor Company was an American icon. He graduated from Gustavus Adolphus College and received a doctorate of divinity from Wagner College before his ordination as a Lutheran pastor in 1957. Between 1958 and 1961, Ford was a pastor of Ivanhoe, Minnesota. In 1961, he moved to work at the United States Military Academy, and was appointed as the academy's chaplain in 1965. Assuming the title at the age of 33, he is the youngest person to have held the role.

== House of Representatives ==
On 15 January 1979, Ford was appointed to be the 58th Chaplain of the United States House of Representatives. He was the first person of the title to serve full time, as all previous House Chaplains were either retired or held other pastorates. In addition, he was the first and only Lutheran to hold the title. Although the position of House Chaplain is voted on by the House of Representatives every two year, Ford became the second-longest serving person to hold the role. He credited his long term to his good standing with the representatives, even when cost-cutting measures threatened to make the chaplain a voluntary position. Ford triggered a political controversy when he retired in 2000, forcing a long debate in the House of Representatives regarding who his successor would be. Eventually, the Roman Catholic Daniel Coughlin was chosen as his successor.

== Personal life ==
On 27 August 2001, he committed suicide on his boat while moored at a marina in Washington, DC. The District of Columbia medical examiner listed cause of death as a self-inflicted gunshot wound. He was 70 years old at death.

Religious titles
Preceded by Edward G. Latch	59th US House Chaplain; January 10, 1979 – March 23, 2000	Succeeded by Daniel Coughlin
