= John Brackenridge (clergyman) =

John Brackenridge (c. 1772 – May 2, 1844) was a Presbyterian minister who served as Chaplain of the United States House of Representatives (from 1822 to 1823) and Chaplain of the United States Senate (from 1811 to 1814).

== Early years ==
Brackenridge was born in Cumberland County, Pennsylvania, the son of Scots-Irish Presbyterians Robert and Margaret (née Douglas) Brackenridge. Thereafter the family moved to the Juniata Valley, Hopewell, now Penn Township in Huntingdon County, Pennsylvania. In 1779 in what came to be known as the “Brackenridge Massacre”, his father and an older sister named Nancy were killed during an Indian raid. John and his brother James escaped death because they had been in the wilds hunting for a lost horse, but each was given to other families to be raised. The family who took John moved almost at once to the part of Virginia which became Washington, D.C., and it was not until 1839, that an overheard conversation resulted in the two brothers being reunited after 60 years' time.

Brackenridge’s formal education included studies at Dickinson College in Carlisle, Pennsylvania. Brackenridge was ordained by the Presbytery of Baltimore in 1795 and thereafter, he was charged to serve in the new federal capital at Washington, D.C. The initial congregation he served was known as St. Andrew’s Church.

== Ministry ==
John Brackenridge has the distinction of having been the first pastor of the Presbyterian Church to serve in the new Federal City of Washington, D.C.

Brackenridge was sent by the Presbytery of Baltimore to serve as a missionary in the area around the navy yard in Washington, D.C., a post he filled between 1811 and 1819, forming what became the First Presbyterian Church of Washington, D.C. That congregation’s building was left intact when the hill on which the Capitol stands was created using fill. So the foundation of the Capitol is, literally, First Presbyterian Church of Washington, D.C.

While serving there, Brackenridge was elected to serve as Chaplain of the Senate, and held that position from 1811 to 1814. Brackenridge was one of fourteen Presbyterian ministers to serve as Chaplain of the Senate to date. A sermon he preached in the House chambers in mid-summer 1814 accurately predicted that the British would reach and burn the federal buildings in the new capital city.

On May 11, 1824, the new Presbytery of the District of Columbia first met in Alexandria, Virginia. Previously part of the Presbytery of Baltimore, the new presbytery had church membership of 277 and the first moderator was the reverend John Brackenridge, who at that time was Chaplain of the U.S. House of Representatives. He went on to serve as pastor to the Bladensburg (MD) Presbyterian Church for more than 40 years, and supervised the creation of the Rockville Academy.

== Personal life ==
Brackenridge was married to (Elisa) Eleanor White, the daughter of Zachariah and Mary Beall White of Maryland. Three sons and two daughters were born to them, including a daughter, Mary, who pre-deceased them, their other children were James Madison Brackenridge, John Adams Brackenridge, Thomas Jefferson Brackenridge and Attilia Ann Brackenridge (who married Edward G. Handy).

His son, John A. Brackenridge (1800–1862), was an attorney who practiced in Indiana and was famous for his oratory; he lent the young Abraham Lincoln books and Lincoln traveled far to hear his closing arguments. John's son George Washington Brackenridge was a philanthropist in San Antonio, Texas.

The Brackenridge family lived on the site of the Soldier’s Home in Washington, D.C.; he sold the 40 acres (160,000 m^{2}) of land to William Wilson Corcoran who then sold it to the United States Government. Brackenridge died May 2, 1844, and was buried beside his wife on the grounds of the Soldier’s Home. The inscription on the tombstone reads: “In memory of Rev. John Brackenridge, who died May 2, 1844, he was the first Presbyterian minister in Washington. Fully supplied the congregation of Bladensburg for 40 years. The Rockville Academy was reared under his superintendence. He sleeps after a prudent, useful, pious life beside his wife. The Orphans Asylum of Washington her unassuming labor of love.”

Religious titles
| Preceded by Walter Dulaney Addison | Chaplain of the United States Senate; November 13, 1811 – September 27, 1814^{1} | Succeeded by Jesse Lee |
| Preceded by Jared Sparks | Chaplain of the United States House of Representatives; December 2, 1822 – December 1, 1823^{2} | Succeeded by Henry Bidleman Bascom |
Notes and references
1. "Senate Chaplain". www.senate.gov. United States Senate.; 2. "History of the Chaplaincy, Office of the Chaplain".
