= John Newland Maffitt (preacher) =

Irish-born nationally recognized American Methodist clergyman and itinerant preacher

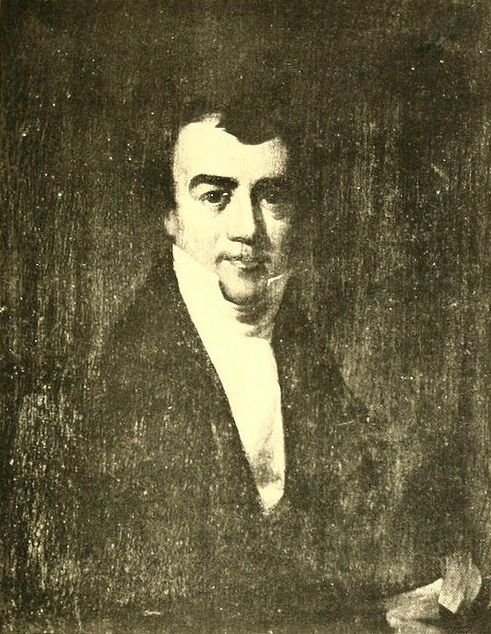
Rev. John Newland Maffitt

John Newland Maffitt Sr. (December 28, 1795, in Dublin, Ireland – May 28, 1850, in Alabama), was an Irish-born, nationally recognized American Methodist clergyman and itinerant preacher.

== Career ==
Maffitt emigrated from Ireland in 1819 and in 1822 began preaching in the New England conference of the Methodist Episcopal Church. He won fame as a charismatic orator with an unconventionally dramatic preaching style which attracted large crowds in cities up and down the Eastern seaboard and as far west as New Orleans. Though Maffit's showmanship brought suspicion from religious leaders and others, he gained national recognition after he was reported to have converted President-elect William Henry Harrison in the winter of 1840-41.

In 1841 he served as chaplain in the House of Representatives. Maffitt's preaching career suffered following a divorce and accusations of sexual impropriety.

== Family ==
Maffitt's son, John Newland Maffitt, the "Prince of Privateers," was a famous officer in the Confederate Navy during the American Civil War.

Religious titles
Preceded by John W. French	Chaplain of the United States House of Representatives; December 13, 1841 – December 14, 1842	Succeeded by Frederick T. Tiffany
