= Daniel Coughlin =

American politician (born 1934)

The Reverend Daniel P. Coughlin

59th Chaplain of the United States House of Representatives
- In office March 23, 2000 – April 14, 2011
- Preceded by: James D. Ford
- Succeeded by: Patrick J. Conroy

Personal details
- Born: Daniel P. Coughlin; November 8, 1934 (age 91) Illinois, U.S.
- Education: St. Mary of the Lake Seminary; Loyola University, Chicago

Daniel P. Coughlin (born November 8, 1934) is an American Catholic priest who served as the 59th Chaplain of the United States House of Representatives from 2000, to 2011. He was the first Catholic to serve in the position, and the process that led to his selection included some controversy.

== Life and early priesthood ==
Coughlin was born November 8, 1934, in Illinois. The son of Dan and Lucille Coughlin, he was raised on the North side of Chicago and graduated from Saint Mary of the Lake Seminary in Mundelein, Illinois, with a degree in Theology. Coughlin was ordained for the Archdiocese of Chicago on May 3, 1960. In 1968 he received a degree in Pastoral Studies from Loyola University, Chicago.

From 1985 to 1990 Coughlin was pastor at St. Francis Xavier Parish in La Grange, Illinois. He then became Director of the Cardinal Stritch Retreat House in Mundelein, Illinois. In 1995 he began working as Vicar for Priests of the Archdiocese of Chicago under Joseph Bernardin and later Francis George. His work both at the retreat house and in his role as Vicar for Priests—a position that included offering pastoral care to priests, including those involved in sexual abuse cases—would later lead to accusations of impropriety (that he was somehow involved with the overall problem of covering up sex crimes within the Catholic Church) later in his career.

Coughlin's role was, in his words, a "pastor for priests," helping priests "comply with whatever protocols the archdiocese mandated," rather than making decisions about how accused priests should be managed. The Catholic League for Religious and Civil Rights called any allegations of wrongdoing on Coughlin's part a "witch hunt." Coughlin held the position of Vicar for Priests until he was sworn in as House Chaplain.

During the mid-1980s, during a sabbatical from his work in Illinois, he lived and worked with Trappist monks in Kentucky's Gethsemani Abbey, and worked in India with Calcutta's Missionaries of Charity. He has also served on numerous national and international committees focusing on the subjects of spirituality and renewal in prayer, and served as a scholar-in-residence at the North American College in Rome. He is also a contributor to "The Spiritual Renewal of the American Priesthood," a publication of the National Conference of Catholic Bishops.

== House of Representatives ==
=== Selection process controversy ===
The selection of the 59th Chaplain of the House of Representatives was a controversial process prior to Coughlin's eventual selection. Then House Speaker Dennis Hastert appointed a bipartisan search committee made up of 18 congressional members to recommend a new chaplain to him, but when that committee reportedly recommended a Catholic priest, Fr Timothy O'Brien (selected by secret ballot after consideration of more than 50 applicants and nominees for the position), Hastert chose Presbyterian minister Charles Parker Wright instead.

In a "personal privilege" address to Congress on March 20, 2009, Hastert denied that O'Brien's name was given to him as the first choice of the committee, instead saying that O'Brien's name was the first of the final three names submitted to him because the names were in alphabetical order, not numerical ranking.

Hastert's decision not to select O'Brien led to accusations of anti-Catholic bias, and ultimately resulted in Wright's decision to withdraw his name from consideration. Hastert, a native of and representative from Illinois, had his staff reach out to Chicago's archbishop, Francis Cardinal George, for a recommendation of a priest to fill the role of House Chaplain, leading to the selection of Coughlin.

Coughlin was described as a 65-year-old "gentle, soft-spoken priest," who said he was "blown away" by the news that he had been "plucked out of obscurity for the job and thrust into the middle of a political maelstrom." Responding to a reporter's comment that he was being thrown into a "lion's den," Coughlin noted that perhaps it was fitting that his name was "Daniel."

Hastert formally interviewed Coughlin on March 13, 2000, and Coughlin was sworn in as the fifty-ninth Chaplain of the House of Representatives on March 23, beginning his service with the 106th Congress. Since he was named while congress was in session, he served as Acting Chaplain throughout the remainder of the 106th Congress, formally elected to a full term as House Chaplain on January 3, 2001, when the 107th Congress convened.

=== Service ===
As House Chaplain, Coughlin opened every session with a prayer, either delivering it himself or coordinating the service of a guest chaplain (often nominated by members of the House, representing their home districts). Coughlin has noted that "Welcoming guest chaplains is one of the very rewarding things I do. It shows the breadth and depth of the religious experience in the U.S., and is a shining beacon of religious liberty." He has also shared his belief in "prayer and the power of prayer," and its power to "bring about change in the nation's capital."

As House Chaplain, he also offered and coordinated pastoral counseling to the House community, and his office coordinated a website with information about worship services and upcoming special events in the areas of religion and faith in the Capitol Hill and Washington, D.C., area.

Coughlin has noted that he "sensed how deeply lawmakers value prayer and the presence of the chaplain in the halls of Congress" after the September 11 attacks. He has noted that his understanding of this need brought "a further gravity to his duties."

Coughlin has sometimes referred to the "House family," to which he offers pastoral care regardless of the religions of its members and staffers, or whether individuals identify with a religious faith at all. For example, during the 110th Congress, when six House members died, Coughlin sensed the pain of Congress, even while he worked with families and ceremonies linked to this unusually high number of deaths.

He has spoken of a special pain on the part of Catholic members during debates within the Catholic Church over withholding Holy Communion from public officials whose votes (especially votes that could be interpreted as "pro-choice") were interpreted as being antithetical to Church teaching.

Referring to such debates as "very upsetting," Coughlin said that he "talked to members of the hierarchy on that as well as members of the House," telling Church leaders that he would "stay with my people whatever you do. I will be with my people whatever you do. I will hear them out. I will be with them." Coughlin has called this situation – the threat of using the liturgy "as a threat" – "one of the saddest stories I heard."

When asked whether a Catholic priest with his own theological beliefs can minister to the spiritual needs of men and women of all faiths, he acknowledged his own "limitations". Therefore, he met with ministers, rabbis, and other religious leaders to "refer members of Congress to people who speak their spiritual language." He also noted that "We have many more common concerns than differences," and that many conversations are not linked to any one religion's theological beliefs.

Coughlin's service to the members and staffs of the House have earned him praise from both sides of the aisle. In 2010, then-Speaker Nancy Pelosi described him by saying that "He has seen us through the dark and through the bright," and Representative Jim Sensenbrenner (R-Wis.) confessed to being "a better person for having known Father Coughlin and having been counseled by him." Representative Daniel Lipinski (D-Ill.) called him "an inspiration."

As a 2010 article in The Washington Post noted, on the occasion of Coughlin's tenth anniversary in the House Chaplain position, "there is ample evidence that the rancor that accompanied his selection has disappeared: Last week, lawmakers from both parties streamed onto the House floor to honor his decade of service."

== Honors and awards ==
His awards and recognitions include the Distinguished Service Award from the Washington Theological Union in October 2006, the Alumni Extraordinary Service Award from the Institute of Pastoral Studies at Loyola University, and an Honorary Doctorate in Theology from Lewis University. In addition, House Resolution 1216, introduced in 2010 by Congressman Dan Lipinski to honor Coughlin's first ten years as House Chaplain, was passed by a vote of 412–0. In 2002 he received the John F. Kennedy National Award by the Saint Patrick's Committee of Holyoke, MA, presented annually to an American of Irish descent who has distinguished oneself in one's chosen field.

== Successor ==
A search for Coughlin's successor as House Chaplain was begun shortly before his retirement, with final approval in the hands of House Speaker John Boehner. In a 2011 audio interview with America magazine conducted two weeks before his retirement, Coughlin asked that citizens not only pray for all congressional members "by name," but also pray for the new House Chaplain.

Coughlin noted that "If the chaplain is not a man of prayer -- or a person of prayer -- and a person of peace, we're good for nobody." On May 6, 2011, an announcement was made that the Jesuit priest Patrick J. Conroy was nominated to succeed Coughlin.

== Picture gallery ==
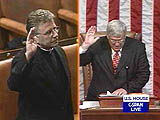
House Speaker Dennis Hastert swears in Coughlin as House Chaplain, March 23, 2000

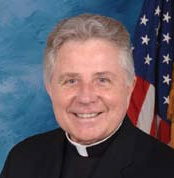
Photo from House of Representatives Chaplain Office brochure

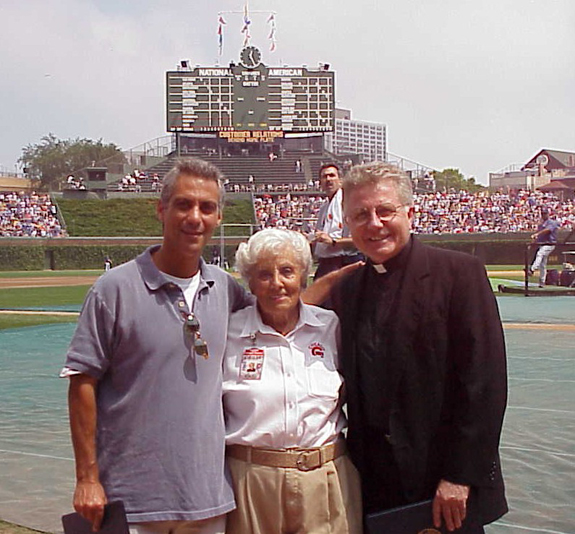
Coughlin with his mother Louise Coughlin and Rahm Emanuel, Wrigley Field, 2003

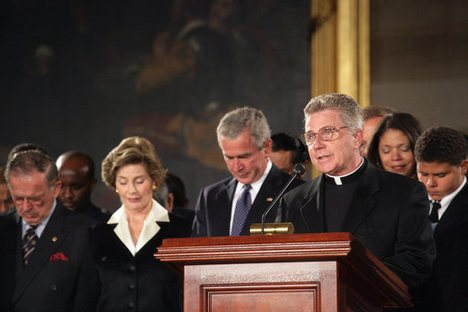
Delivering invocation at ceremony honoring Rosa Parks, with President George W. Bush and first lady Laura, 2005
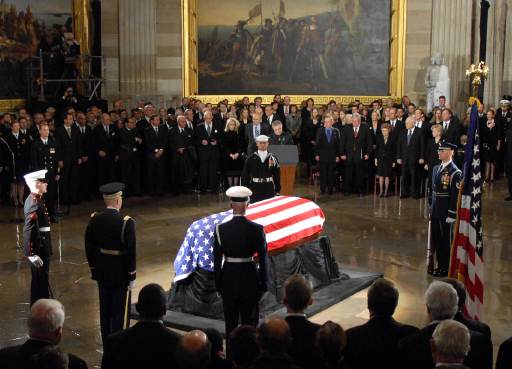
Coughlin (at podium) delivering invocation at memorial service for former President Gerald Ford, 2006.

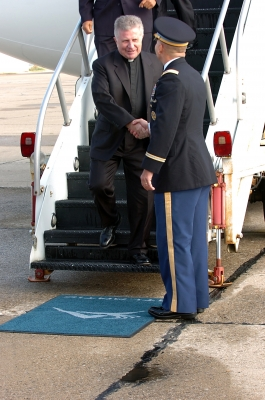
Coughlin arrives in Cleveland for funeral of Representative Stephanie Tubbs, 2008.

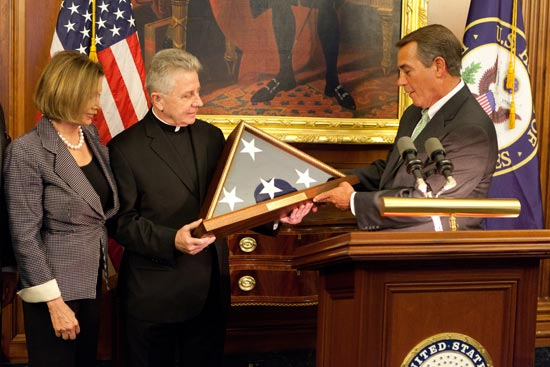
Speaker Boehner and Minority Leader Pelosi present Coughlin with a flag flown over the Capitol, 2011.

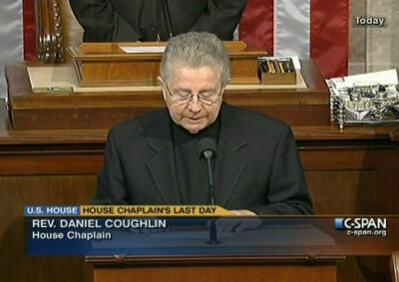
Coughlin delivers his final prayer as House Chaplain, April 14, 2011.

== See also ==
- Chaplain
- Chaplain of the United States House of Representatives
- Chaplain of the United States Senate

Religious titles
| Preceded by James D. Ford | 60th US House Chaplain; March 23, 2000 – April 14, 2011 | Succeeded by Patrick J. Conroy |
