= Nicholas Snethen =

American farmer, itinerant preacher, minister and church leader

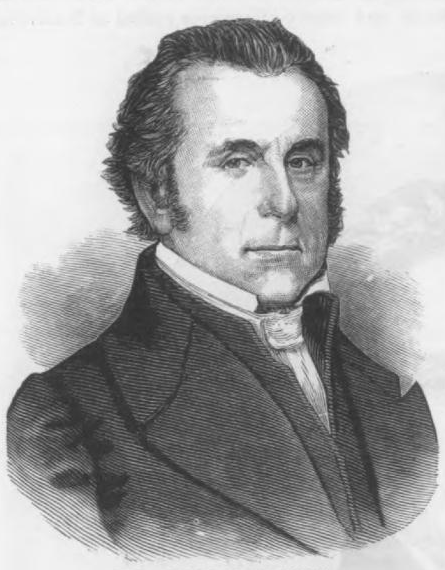
- Born: November 15, 1769; Long Island, Province of New York
- Died: May 30, 1845 (aged 75); Princeton, Indiana
- Occupation(s): Clergyman, farmer
- Spouse: Susannah Hood Worthington (m. 1804)

Nicholas Snethen (November 15, 1769 – May 30, 1845) was an American farmer, itinerant preacher, minister, and church leader.

He served as chaplain of the US House of Representatives and was a founder of the Methodist Protestant Church in the United States. He was referred to as "my silver trumpet" by Rev. Francis Asbury.

== Early years ==
Snethen was born to Barak Snethen and Ann Weeks on November 15, 1769 in Fresh Pond, a settlement near present day Glen Cove, in the British Province of New York. Barak Snethen was an officer in the American militia during the French and Indian War and participated in the Montreal Campaign.

Nicholas Snethen helped his father and grandfather in various family businesses during his youth. At various times, his family operated a schooner, ferrying people and goods around New York harbor, farming operations on both Long Island and Staten Island, and milling services in New Jersey. Snethen attended a country school and was instructed in religious matters by his mother, who came from a Quaker family, and his father, whose family belonged to the Dutch Reformed Church. Snethen first professed religion to a Bishop in the Episcopal Church at age 18, but he soon converted to Methodism.

== Ministry ==
While upgrading his education, Snethen served as the first Methodist class leader in the Old Sands Street Methodist Episcopal Church in Brooklyn, New York. He was accepted into the Methodist Ministry in September, 1794 at age 25. For the next four years, Snethen served the church followers in remote rural areas of Connecticut, Vermont and Maine. He returned to New York in 1798,

From 1798 to 1800 Snethen ministered in Charleston, South Carolina. In 1800, he was ordained an Elder at a regional Methodist conference there at age 31. That same year, he traveled with Asbury to the General (National) Conference of Methodists in Baltimore.

After the conference, Snethen stayed in Baltimore. While there, he met Susannah Hood Worthington, whom he married 1804. The couple then moved to New York, where Snethen served as senior preacher. In 1806, the couple moved back to his wife's farm in Linganore, Maryland,

Living in Lignanore, Snethen preached in Baltimore, Georgetown and Alexandria, Virginia. In 1811, he was appointed Chaplain to the US House of Representatives. During this assignment, Snethen met Henry Clay of Kentucky and John Randolph of Virginia.

== Church schism ==
From at least 1800 onward, the Methodist Church in America was divided over the question of how much authority the congregants should have to select their own preachers, and how much authority preachers should have to select their own assignments, rather than leaving the authority to make these decisions solely in the power of the church's bishops.

Snethen always took the Republican side, favoring power over these decisions being vested in the laity and ministers rather than the bishops. Eventually the Methodist Church divided over this issue, one side becoming the Methodist Episcopal Church and the other the Methodist Protestant Church. Mr. Snethen was one of the founding fathers of the Methodist Protestant Church.

Although his views on lay representation were opposed to those of Asbury, the two men remained on good terms. Snethen delivered a eulogy of Asbury following the latter's death in 1816. That same year, Snethen ran for a seat in the U S House of Representatives from the Third Congressional District of Maryland on the Federalist party ticket, but lost the election.

== Later years ==
In 1829, financial reversals and moral compulsions led Snethen and his wife to sell their farm in Maryland and emancipate their slaves. The family moved to Merom, Indiana, . A year and a half later both Snethen's wife and one of his daughters were dead, probably from milk sickness caused by snakeroot poisoning

After his wife's death, Snethen returned to itinerant preaching for the church, traveling extensively. He went back to New York for a time and lived in Louisville, Kentucky and Cincinnati, Ohio for extended periods.

In 1844 Snethen was called to preside over the new Snethen School for Young Ministers in Iowa City, Iowa. While there, he officiated as Chaplain to the Iowa State Territorial Legislature during its session that year. He was then named headmaster of the school

In 1845, while traveling from Cincinnati to Iowa, he stopped in Princeton, Indiana to visit his two daughters. After a short illness, Snethen died there on May 30, 1845 at age 75. He was buried next to his wife and three of their children in Warnock Cemetery.
