= Shiva Vishnu Hindu Temple of Greater Cleveland =

Hindu temple in Cleveland Metropolitan Area US

- Location in Ohio

Religion
- Affiliation: Hinduism
- Deity: Vishnu, Shiva

Location
- Location: 7773 Ridge Road, Parma, Ohio, 44129
- State: Ohio
- Country: United States
- Interactive map of Shiva Vishnu Hindu Temple of Greater Cleveland
- Coordinates: 41.355853°N 81.733529°W

Architecture
- Completed: 1989

Website
- www.shivavishnutemple.org

The Shiva Vishnu Hindu Temple of Greater Cleveland is a Hindu Temple in Parma, Ohio and serves the Hindu population of the Greater Cleveland Area. The central deities at the temple are Shiva and Vishnu.

== History ==
In 1983, a group of Hindus began organizing religious gathering at Cleveland State University. In 1984, a charter was granted to the group and the name of the temple was established. In 1985, the group began renting a closed restaurant to hold temple gatherings. For several years, the search for a permanent place of worship continued amidst the perceived antagonism from the local community toward the development of a Hindu temple in North Royalton, Ohio. In 1987, the group purchased a building that sat on 22 acres of land in Parma, Ohio. In 1989, the building was renovated and transformed into a Hindu temple.

On 10 September 1989, the temple was inaugurated with the sacred images of the deities previously worshiped at the rented location in the presence 2,000 Hindus. In 1997, the temple was remodeled to accommodate the growing Hindu population and expanded to 32 Acres. In 2001, the priests' housing was constructed and the installation of the temple's shikhars were completed. In 2007 and 2008, the temple further expanded.

== Design and Deities ==
The temple houses 18 shrines with various deities. The central deities are Shiva and Vishnu, making up the two main shrines of the temple. The sacred image of Shiva is located centrally-left and the sacred image of Vishnu is located centrally-right.

An altar of Ganesh is right outside the Shiva altar and Durga and Laxmi are in the middle of the Shiva and Vishnu altar. Nandi the bull is also outside the Shiva altar and looks directly at Shiva. The walls are sculpted with the designs of many Hindu Gods and Goddesses. The temple is flanked on all sides by wetlands. The temple itself is over 11,000 Square feet.
