= Montgomery D. Corse =

Confederate States Civil War general and businessman

Montgomery Dent Corse
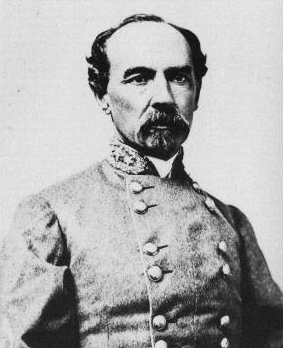
- Born: March 14, 1816; Alexandria, Virginia, US
- Died: February 11, 1895 (aged 78); Alexandria, Virginia, US
- Burial place: St. Paul's Cemetery (Alexandria, Virginia)
- Military career
- Allegiance: Confederate States of America
- Branch: Confederate States Army
- Service years: 1861–1865 (CSA)
- Rank: Brigadier General
- Conflicts: American Civil War

Montgomery Dent Corse (March 14, 1816 – February 11, 1895) was an American banker, gold prospector, and soldier who served as a general in the Confederate States Army during the Civil War. He commanded the 17th Virginia Infantry and then Corse's Brigade of Pickett's Division in the Army of Northern Virginia, and served in several of that army's most important battles.

== Early life and career ==
Montgomery D. Corse was born in Alexandria, Virginia in 1816, the eldest son of John and Julia Corse. He attended Major Bradley Lowe's military school at Colross and Benjamin Hallowell's school on Washington Street. As a young boy he witnessed Lafayette's 1825 visit to Alexandria and participated in the inauguration of President Andrew Jackson in 1829.

He worked in business with his father and was then a captain in the 1st Virginia Regiment during the Mexican–American War. He sailed for California in 1849 and participated in the Gold Rush. He returned permanently to Alexandria in 1856 and entered the banking business with his brothers, J. D. and William Corse. Three years later became the first lieutenant of the Alexandria Home Guard. In 1860, he organized a militia company known as the Old Dominion Rifles and became its captain.

== Civil War service ==
In early 1861 he was given an appointment as the major of the 6th Virginia Infantry Battalion and soon after that he received the colonelcy of the 17th Virginia Infantry. He commanded the 17th at Blackburn's Ford during the First Battle of Manassas, as well during the 1862 Peninsula Campaign. He saw action at the battles of Yorktown, Williamsburg, Seven Pines, and throughout the Seven Days Battles. During the subsequent Northern Virginia Campaign, Corse commanded Kemper's Brigade during the Second Battle of Manassas until he was wounded. He was healthy enough to participate in the Maryland Campaign and was wounded at both South Mountain and Antietam at the head of his regiment. A new brigade was created for him, and he was promoted to brigadier general on November 1. His brigade was placed in a division commanded by General George E. Pickett and was only lightly engaged at Fredericksburg.

Corse married Elizabeth Beverley on November 22, 1862. They had four children.

In early 1863 he accompanied Lt. Gen. James Longstreet on an expedition to southeastern Virginia, resulting of the absence of Corse and his brigade from the rest of the army during the Battle of Chancellorsville. During the Gettysburg campaign, Corse's Brigade was detached from Pickett's Division to guard Hanover Junction, north of Richmond. Because of this, the brigade did not participate in the battle nor the disastrous assault known as Pickett's Charge.

Pickett's Division was detached from Longstreet's Corps when they were transferred to Georgia and Tennessee in late 1863, operating in western Virginia. In January 1864, Corse and his brigade participated in Pickett's operations against New Bern, North Carolina. After seeing action at Drewry's Bluff against Benjamin Butler's Bermuda Hundred operation, the brigade finally rejoined the Army of Northern Virginia and fought at Cold Harbor and through the Siege of Petersburg. Following the disaster at the Battle of Five Forks, they began the retreat which would eventually end at Appomattox Court House. Corse himself was captured at the Battle of Sayler's Creek on April 6, 1865.

After his surrender, General Corse was conveyed to Fort Warren near Boston, Massachusetts, on the day that Abraham Lincoln was assassinated, and he and the fourteen generals accompanying him narrowly escaped the violence of a mob at a town in Pennsylvania on the next morning. They were only saved by the determination of their small guard of Union soldiers and officers.

== Postbellum career ==
Following the war, he took the Oath of Allegiance to the United States of America on July 24, 1865, and was released from Fort Warren. He subsequently returned to his banking profession in Alexandria, Virginia, with his brothers. He was a charter member of the R.E. Lee Camp of the United Confederate Veterans. In 1870, he was seriously injured when part of the Virginia State Capitol building in Richmond collapsed. He suffered partial blindness for several years thereafter. On May 24, 1880, Corse was a distinguished guest along with Governor Fitzhugh Lee and General Joseph E. Johnston at the dedication of the Confederate monument at Washington and Prince Streets in Alexandria.

M. D. Corse died at his home in Alexandria on February 11, 1895, following a brief illness. He and his wife are buried in the town's Episcopal Cemetery. His personal and wartime papers are in the special collections of the Alexandria Library.

== See also ==
- List of American Civil War generals (Confederate)
