= Gadsby's Tavern =

Historic building in Virginia, US

- U.S. National Register of Historic Places
- U.S. National Historic Landmark
- Virginia Landmarks Register
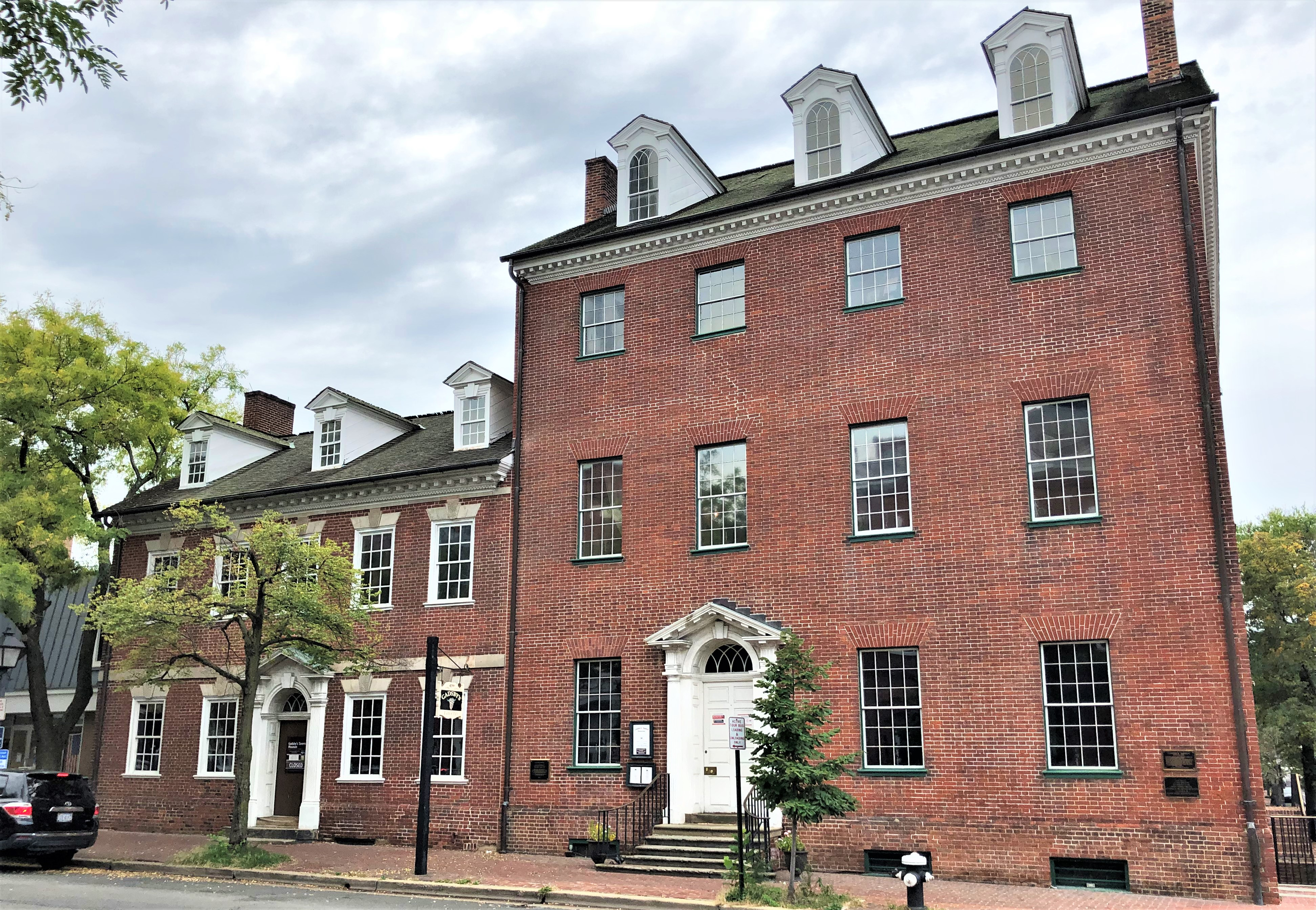
- (2021)

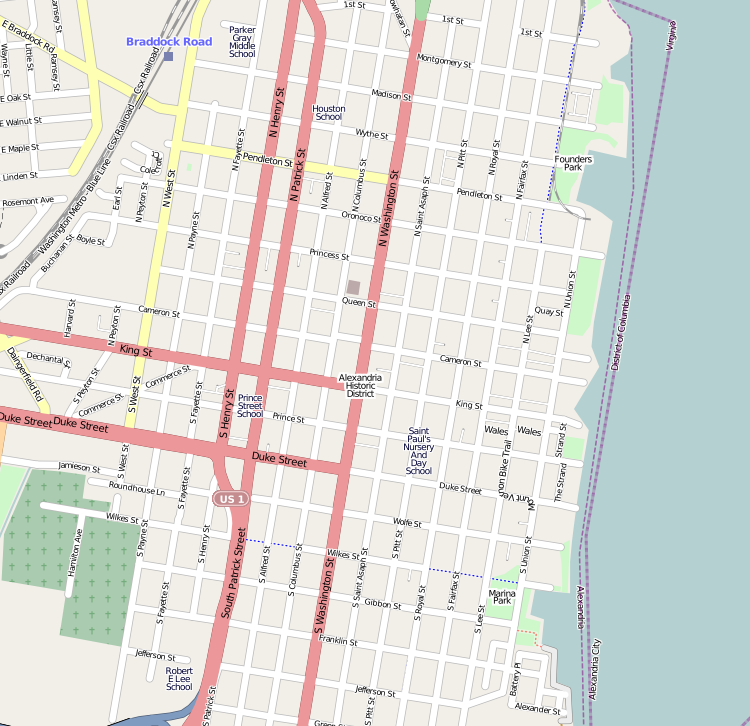
- Location within Alexandria Historical District Location within Alexandria Location within Northern Virginia Location within Virginia Location within the United States
- Location: 138 N. Royal St., Alexandria, Virginia
- Coordinates: 38°48′20″N 77°2′37″W
- Built: 1752
- NRHP reference No.: 66000913
- VLR No.: 100-0029

Significant dates
- Added to NRHP: October 15, 1966
- Designated NHL: November 4, 1963
- Designated VLR: September 9, 1969

Gadsby's Tavern is a complex of historic buildings at 134 and 138 North Royal Street at the corner of Cameron Street in the Old Town district of Alexandria, Virginia. The complex includes a c.1785 tavern, the 1792 City Tavern and Hotel, and an 1878 hotel addition. The taverns were a central part of the social, economic, political, and educational life of the city of Alexandria at the time. Currently, the complex is home to Gadsby's Tavern Restaurant, American Legion Post 24, and Gadsby's Tavern Museum, a cultural history museum. The museum houses exhibits of early American life in Virginia, and the restaurant operates in the original 1792 City Tavern dining room, serving a mixture of period and modern foods.

The complex was designated a National Historic Landmark in 1963 and was added to the National Register of Historic Places in 1966.

== Tavern history ==
Gadsby's Tavern consists of two buildings: one is the tavern, built around 1785, and the other is the 1792 City Hotel. John Gadsby leased and operated them from 1796 to 1808, and it is his name attached to the location.

=== Early history ===
Gadsby's Tavern was not the first tavern on its lot. Between 1749 and 1752, Charles and Anne Mason had begun a tavern business they called Mason's Ordinary. In the 1770s, Mary Hawkins opened a tavern on the lot around the corner from what is now the Gadsby's Tavern Museum. The original lot where Hawkin's tavern sat extended from the southwest corner of Royal and Cameron streets to about mid-block on both streets. In 1778, the plot was subdivided, and Edward Owens purchased the lot on the corner of the two streets. With the end of the Revolutionary War, and the booming economy that followed, Marylander John Wise purchased the plot in 1782 from Owens, and built the existing Georgian-style tavern ca. 1785, and the Federal City Tavern in 1792. Englishman Gadsby leased the City Tavern, the most prominent tavern in Alexandria in 1796. He renewed the lease in 1802 to include the smaller 1785 tavern from Wise, and operated both until 1808 when he moved to Baltimore, Maryland.

John Wise died in 1815, and with his death the buildings went through different hands, being run as a hotel, lawyers' offices, and auction houses. It remained a hotel during the American Civil War.

In 1816, a 23-year-old woman succumbed to a disease at the city tavern after she travelled to Alexandria with her husband. On her deathbed, she made the people surrounding her swear an oath that they would never reveal her identity. The promise was kept; her grave, a table-like structure in St. Paul's Cemetery is marked "Female Stranger". Her ghost is said to haunt the cemetery and Room 8 of Gadsby's Tavern, the room in which she died. The unusual monument and story surrounding it have long been noted as a peculiar oddity of the town.

=== 19th and 20th century ===
In the 1890s, Frederick Schwab (a veteran who had served in the Alexandria Artillery also known as Kemper's Battery) was proprietor of a saloon located in the original 1785 tavern portion of Gadsby's Tavern at 132 N. Royal Street (See 132 street number with “Sal.” for Saloon at the site of the 1785 tavern in the 1891, 1896, and 1902 Sanborn Maps of Alexandria, VA.). He lived there with his family until his death in 1901. By the turn of the 20th century, the building no longer operated as a hotel. Once considered one of the finest establishments of its kind in the country, the building had fallen into complete disrepair. The rooms that had been the setting for political dinners, grand balls, and elaborate public affairs were relegated to housing odd shops and rental apartments. On May 21, 1917, the Metropolitan Museum of Art in New York City purchased some of Alexandria's most important pieces of history, the ballroom woodwork. In doing so, they inadvertently preserved the original historic ballroom when it was moved to New York.

The Met negotiated with the owners of the 1792 City Tavern & Hotel to purchase architectural elements from the hotel. The Met purchased the unique musicians gallery, cornice, door frames, and mantelpieces from the ballroom. Two mantelpieces from the City Hotel dining rooms and the exterior doorway were also sold. On November 11, 1924, the American Wing of The Metropolitan Museum of Art — featuring the permanent installation of the recreated Gadsby's Tavern Ballroom with original woodwork (now named the "Alexandria Ballroom") — opened to the public

=== Famous guests ===
George Washington frequently visited the taverns, and twice attended the annual Birthnight Ball held in his honor. Other prominent customers of the tavern included John Adams, Thomas Jefferson, James Madison, and James Monroe. Thomas Jefferson was feted in 1801 with a banquet in the ballroom of the City Tavern. The Marquis de Lafayette was also guest to festivities at the City Tavern during his tour of the United States in 1824.

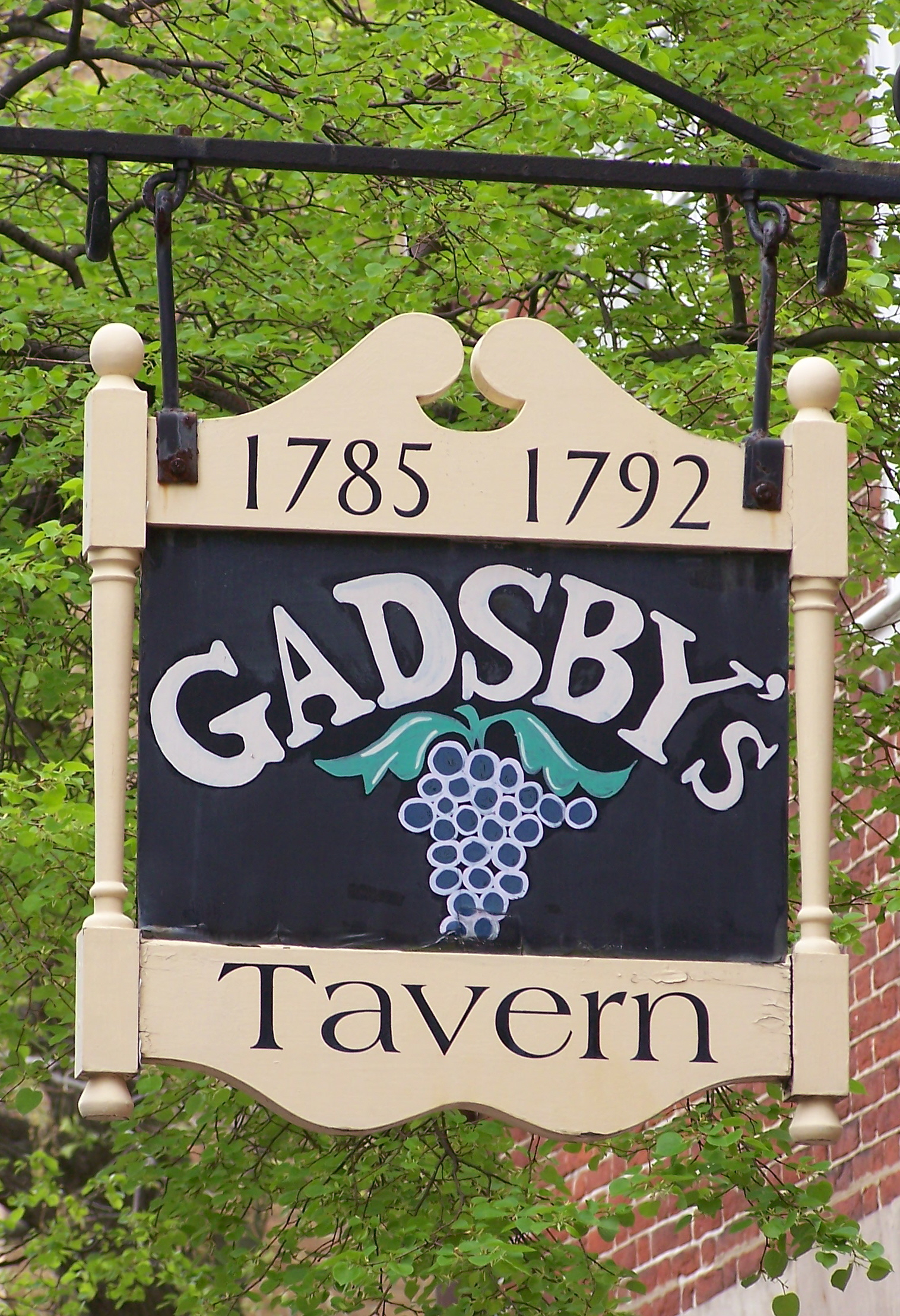
Gadsby's Tavern and Museum sign

=== The Tavern Museum restoration ===
Threatened with demolition in the early 20th century, the buildings were saved and preserved by efforts first undertaken by F. Clinton Knight and carried on by the American Legion, Post 24, along with other patriotic groups. The buildings were reopened in 1976, after extensive renovation, by the City of Alexandria as a museum dedicated to preserving and interpreting the social and cultural heritage of Alexandria by teaching the public about the site and its significant contributions. Clint Knight, a former city councilman, postmaster, and commander of Post 24 mortgaged his home to help purchase the Tavern. The renovators reproduced on the second floor of the Tavern the woodwork of the ballroom that the Metropolitan Museum of Art had earlier acquired.

It was declared a National Historic Landmark in 1963.

== The Tavern Museum today ==
Today, the City of Alexandria continues their preservation and interpretation through Gadsby's Tavern Museum and by leasing the restaurant space, in the 1792 hotel building, to a private restaurateur. The original ballroom woodwork can still be seen at Metropolitan Museum of Art in New York.

The museum offers self guided and guided tours, and group tours by appointment. Self guided tours are $5, and guided tours are $8. Admission is free for city of Alexandria residents and employees, as well as active duty military and veterans.

The museum is part of the American Whiskey Trail, which provides an educational journey into the history and cultural heritage of distilled spirits in American society.

== See also ==
- Thirteen Colonies
- American Revolution
- Confederation Period
- Federalist Era
- Founding Fathers
- Mount Vernon
- Monticello
- List of American Legion buildings
- List of National Historic Landmarks in Virginia
- National Register of Historic Places listings in Alexandria, Virginia
