= Female Stranger =

Site in Alexandra, Virginia, US

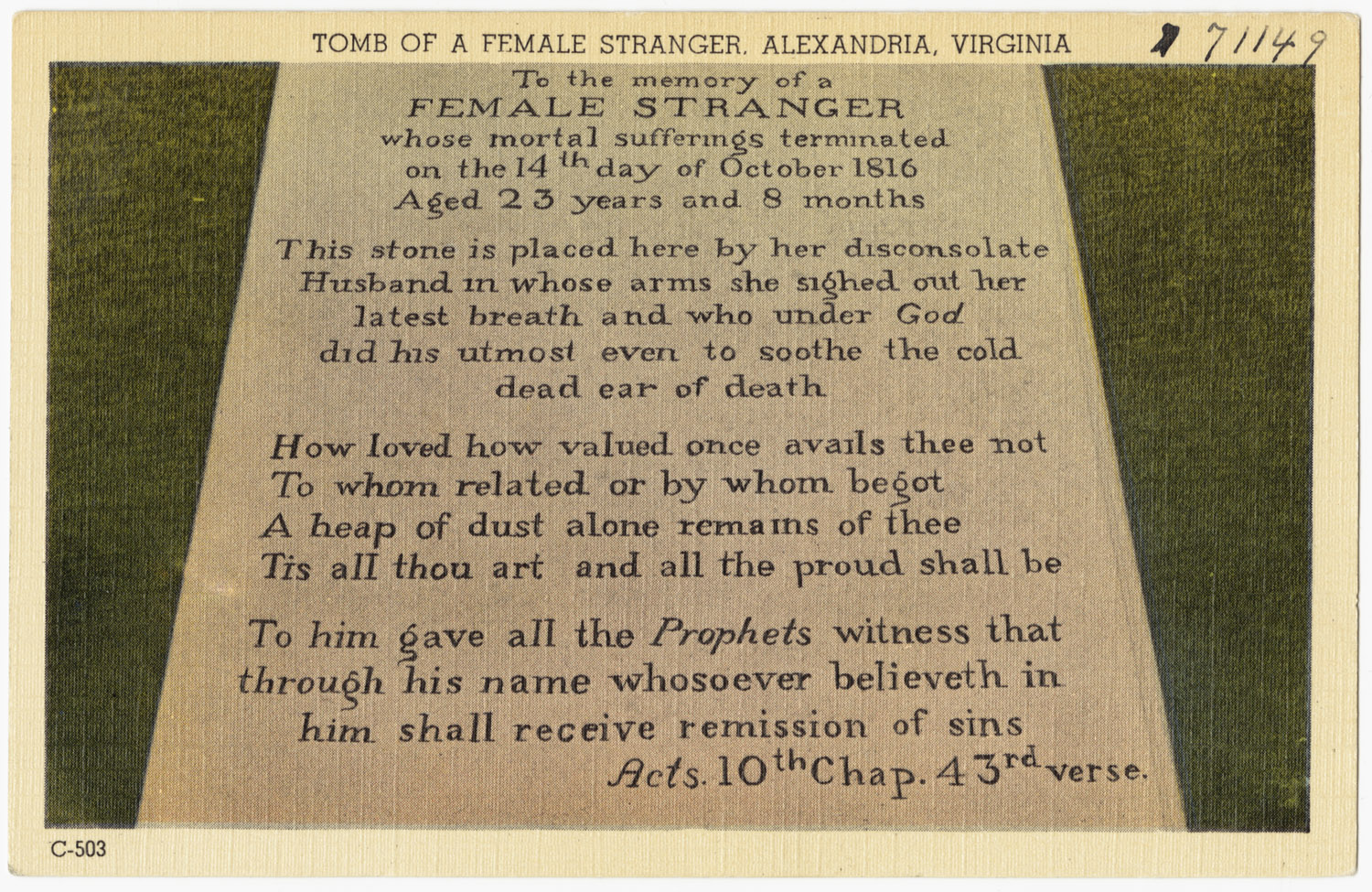
The Grave of the Female Stranger

The Grave of the Female Stranger is a famous historical oddity, local landmark and visitor's attraction in the cemetery of St. Paul's Episcopal Church in Alexandria, Virginia, United States. The grave is the resting place of an unnamed individual who died in 1816 and was elevated to national intrigue by the mysterious headstone and romanticized tale. Accounts of the Female Stranger increased in oddity over time and helped to incite further speculation as to the identity of the person buried in the grave. The reported location of the woman's death, Room 8 at Gadsby's Tavern, is also a visitor's attraction, and her ghostly visage can supposedly be seen standing at the window.

The story has sparked conjecture that has continued for more than two centuries. In addition to various articles and reports, there have also been novels including Narrative of John Trust (1883) by William Francis Carne, author of George Washington's Boyhood.

== Inscription ==
To the memory of a
FEMALE STRANGER
whose mortal sufferings terminated
on the 14th day of October 1816
Aged 23 years and 8 months

This stone is placed here by her disconsolate
Husband in whose arms she sighed out her
latest breath, and who under God
did his utmost even to soothe the cold
dead ear of death

How loved how valued once avails thee not
To whom related or by whom begot
A heap of dust alone remains of thee
Tis all thou art and all the proud shall be

To him gave all the Prophets witness that
through his name whosoever believeth in
him shall receive remission of sins
Acts. 10th Chap. 43rd verse.

The second to last stanza was intended to be taken from Elegy to the Memory of an Unfortunate Lady by Alexander Pope, though there are some differences.

== Accounts and speculation ==
=== Early accounts ===
In May 1833, a poem regarding a visit to the Grave of the Female Stranger was composed for the Alexandria Gazette and published almost a year later, in March 1834. This was at first submitted under the initials S.D.; it was later found to be the work of poet Susan Rigby Dallam Morgan of Baltimore, Maryland, when her husband, the Rev. Lyttleton Morgan, published his wife's poems posthumously. The earliest appeal to the national audience was in 1836 when columnist "Lucy Seymour", a pen name for Dallam Morgan, recorded the account in The Philadelphia Saturday Courier.

In "Seymour's" account, the Female Stranger had been a young, foreign woman with a tearful face and a pale complexion. The woman also seemed ill and troubled. The Stranger's male companion appeared inauthentic to the locals as her husband. True to form, the man quickly left after the Stranger was buried. The only person that the Stranger confided in was a local pastor. "Seymour's" sources are not explicitly named. She implies that she took interest in the cemetery first and then began to ask questions about the interesting gravesite. This pattern of discovery closely mirrors Dallam Morgan's earlier poem. Furthermore, "Seymour" speculates that the tombstone inscription was written in a manner "strangely calculated to awaken interest and elicit sympathy."

In September 1848, the Gazette published a response to an article about the Female Stranger written in The Baltimore Sun. The Gazette writer stated that the Stranger was indeed a beautiful woman of a pale complexion and further elaborated on her grace and the admiration of those around her. The author added that the man's surname was "Clermont" and that after his sudden departure it was revealed that the $1,500 in English currency he had used to pay his bills was counterfeit. Lawrence Hill, one of the men to whom the money was owed, purportedly confronted Clermont sometime later at Sing Sing prison.

Hill was indeed a businessman living in Alexandria at the time. He sold his house in Alexandria in 1830, moved to New York City and died of cholera in the spring of 1849.

=== Later accounts ===
Since the 1880s, there has been speculation that the Stranger may have been Theodosia Burr Alston, the daughter of disgraced Vice President Aaron Burr, who was lost at sea in 1813. However, this idea seems contrived, and the dates given for Theodosia's apparent death and the Stranger's appearance are not consistent.

In September 1886, the Hyde Park Herald published Frank George Carpenter's piece about Alexandria, including a section about the Stranger. This telling includes a doctor sworn to secrecy, two French maids and a reclusive English husband who would not allow anyone to see his wife's face or attend her funeral. The author touched on how Alexandria was a wealthy trading port at the time, and it would not have been odd for foreign diplomats to land there, giving a plausible reason for Theodosia to visit the city.

By 1887, Col. Fred D Massey of Alexandria wrote to the Cincinnati Commercial Gazette (which was later published nationally) that while the legend was well spread, it only helped to further tangle the story and add to the confusion. Massey's version of the story was that a noble couple, seemingly English, arrived by ship with a valet. The wife was a voluptuous blonde with large eyes and a small mouth. She became ill in Alexandria while the couple lived at the "leading hotel" at the time. According to Massey's story, the husband, the valet and a doctor a were the only ones to see her during the illness. The woman died in her husband's arms locked in a kiss. Further, only the husband and the valet were present at the burial. The husband left by ship and was later reported to have been seen in New Orleans. He was rumored to have returned to Alexandria in the dead of night with a crew of seamen and exhumed the body, taking it with him.

The New Orleans Times-Picayune rather boldly published in January 1893 that the grave was Theodosia's and that her husband, South Carolina Governor Joseph Alston (misspelled as Ashton), was seen visiting the grave approximately seventy years prior to the article.

In the 1890s, the concept of the couple being star-crossed lovers was first introduced. In May 1898, the Washington Evening Star reported that two elderly people visited the grave and told the church superintendent that the Stranger was a "connection" of theirs, an English noblewoman who ran away with a British officer for love. They also said that they would visit again with more details but never returned.

Many subsequent accounts have included all or most of these elements. There is also an addition of two local women, also sworn to secrecy, helping the Stranger during her illness.

== Modern retelling ==
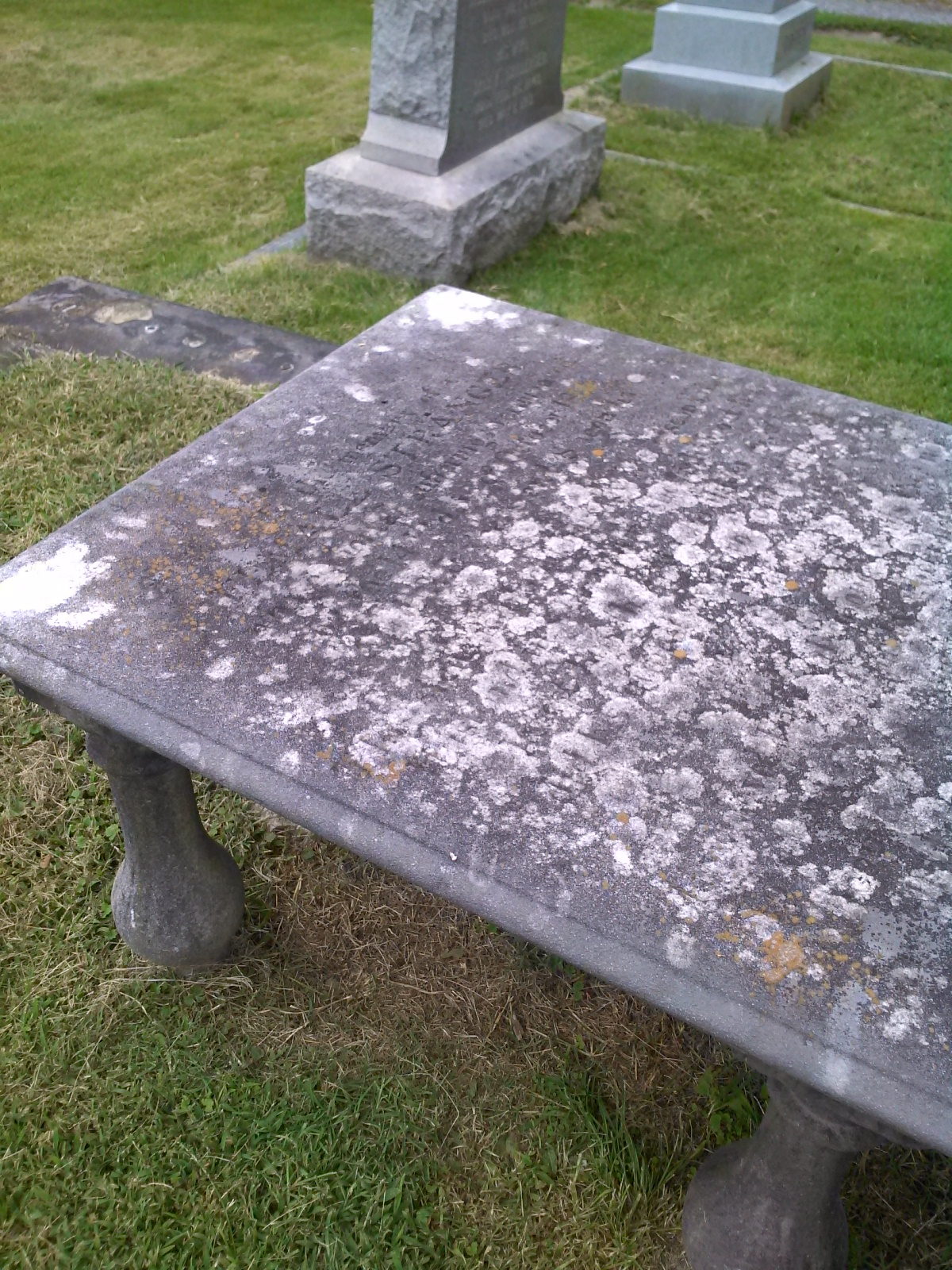
Gravesite of the Female Stranger in Alexandria, Virginia in September 2017

The most modern retelling of the story was recorded as early as 1904 and is quite elaborate, given that it was published nearly a century after Stranger had died. A large spread, including a dramatic illustration, was featured in the Washington Times on December 18 of that year. It tells of the brig Four Sons en route from Halifax, Nova Scotia, to the West Indies, diverting her course for the Potomac River and letting off a small boat carrying a man and a woman. A sick woman covered in a black veil was lifted out of the boat and carried to "Bunch-of-Grapes Tavern" (a misnomer for Gadsby's Tavern, due to the image on the establishment's sign). The man, assumed to be the husband, found the best room at the tavern and sent for the doctor. The doctor was sworn to secrecy, and the woman's face remained covered. Two women staying at the hotel were also sworn to secrecy and helped to nurse the sick woman.

The husband alone witnessed the death, prepared the body for burial and sealed the coffin. He disappeared but returned every fall on the anniversary to put flowers on the grave, ferrying directly over from Washington. After a dozen years, his visits ceased, and the grave fell into disrepair. Years later, three elderly people appeared at the site. When questioned by the church sexton, they revealed that they were relatives of the woman, and that she had married a British officer who had left for France.

Another account stipulated that the woman was indeed Theodosia and the supposed husband was a pirate. Another theory suggests that the woman was Sarah Curran, fiancée of Irish Revolutionist Robert Emmet, who may have been forced to marry a British naval officer. However, the unknown author further acknowledges that this is "pure speculation."

These accounts are detailed in many urban legends from the 21st century with relatively few changes from the original details written in 1913.

== See also ==
- List of unsolved deaths
