= Tom Thumb's Picture Alphabet =

1850s rhyming children's book

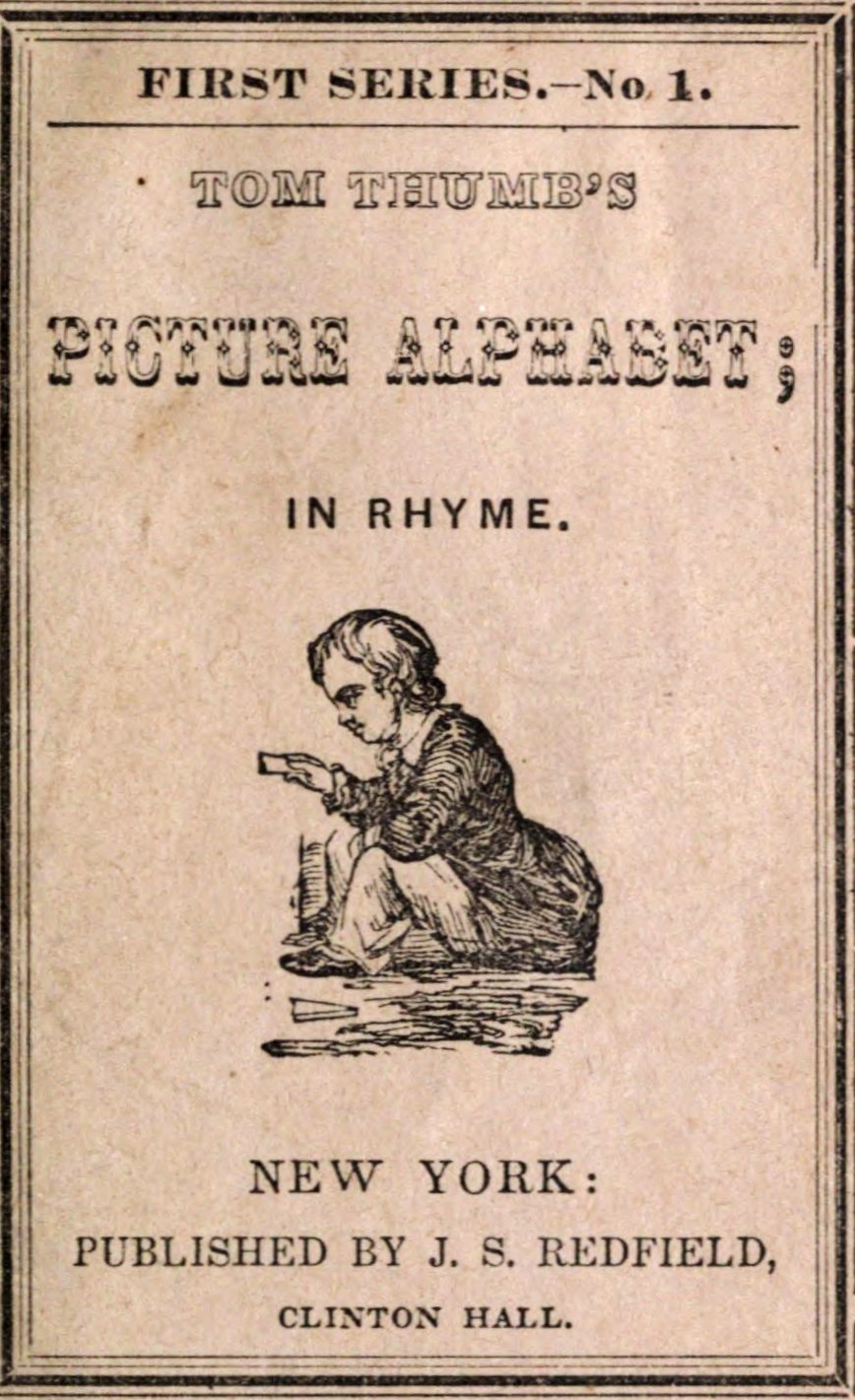
- Cover of the c. 1850 publication.
- Illustrator: John Gadsby Chapman
- Language: English
- Genre: Children's literature
- Publisher: J. S. Redfield
- Publication place: United States
- Media type: Print (chapbook)
- Pages: 7 pp
- OCLC: 21722065
- Text: Tom Thumb's Picture Alphabet at Wikisource

Tom Thumb's Picture Alphabet is an illustrated picture book for children published in 1850s.

== Publication ==
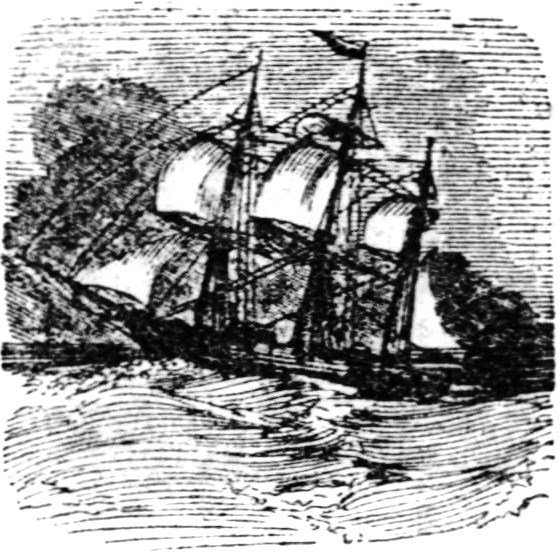
Wood-engraving for "S is a large Ship."

Published at Clinton Hall in New York in the 1850s, Tom Thumb's Picture Alphabet is an illustrated chapbook consisting of a rhyming English alphabet; considered part of the New England Primer. It was the first book in the first of the "Redfield's Toy Books" series, a four-part series of 48 children's books. The selling price for Tom Thumb's Picture Alphabet was 1 cent. The wood engravings, designed by John Gadsby Chapman, were considered plain and simple illustrations. Printed on seven pages, Tom Thumb's Picture Alphabet book height was 9 centimetres (3.5 in). It also features an advertisement for other J. S. Redfield publications for toy books, school books, and medical books.

It was advertised in many publications, including The consumptive's guide to health, Americans warned of Jesuitism, and others.

Tom Thumb's Picture Alphabet is considered one of several schoolbooks of the early 19th century in competition, during a period where there was a great expansion of educational books for children made available. A review from the School Library Journal is mixed, saying that while some of the book provided "a tidy sentence for each letter," other words used in the rhyme schemes would either be unfamiliar to many children, or they would "stretch to rhyme."

== Reprints and derivatives ==
Tom Thumb's Picture Alphabet has been republished and reprinted many times, by publisher's such as Kiggins and Kellogg. A version published by Scholastic in 2002 includes new illustrations by Tiphanie Beeke, which appears in Treasury Of Alphabets.

== Sources ==
- Baker, Liza (2002). Treasury Of Alphabets. Scholastic. ISBN 9780439404334. (92 pages)
- Carpenter, Charles H. (1963). History of American schoolbooks. University of Pennsylvania Press. p. 322. ISBN 9780598353436.
- Goetzmann, William H. (2008). Ideas Make a Nation. Basic Books. ISBN 9780465004959. (480 pages)
- Tom Thumb's Picture Alphabet . J. S. Redfield – via Wikisource. (12 pages)
- Pitrat, John Claudius (1851). Americans warned of Jesuitism. J.S. Redfield. p. 266. ISBN 9781425525033.
- Potter, J. Hamilton (1852). The consumptive's guide to health (2 ed.). J. S. Redfield. p. 176.
- School Library Journal. Vol. 49. R.R. Bowker Company. 2003.
