= Conrad Wise Chapman =

American painter

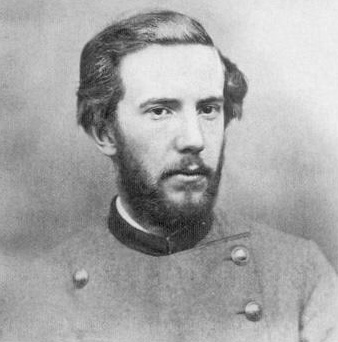
- Chapman in uniform, c. 1862
- Born: February 14, 1842; Washington, D.C., U.S.
- Died: December 10, 1910 (aged 68); Hampton, Virginia, U.S.
- Known for: Painting, drawing
- Military career
- Allegiance: Confederate States
- Branch: Confederate States Army
- Service years: 1861–1865
- Rank: Ordnance Sergeant
- Units: 3d Kentucky Infantry; 46th Virginia Infantry; 59th Virginia Infantry
- Conflicts: American Civil War: Battle of Shiloh (WIA)

Conrad Wise Chapman (February 14, 1842 – December 10, 1910) was an American painter who served in the Confederate States Army from 1861 to 1865.

== Early life ==
Conrad Wise Chapman was born in Washington, D.C. and grew up in Europe where his father, John Gadsby Chapman, was working as an artist. His older brother, John Linton Chapman, was also an artist.

== Career ==
In 1861, Chapman returned to America and enlisted in Company D, 3rd Kentucky Infantry Regiment. He was wounded in Shiloh along with seeing action in Mississippi and Louisiana, before a transfer to the 46th Virginia Infantry at the request of his father to Henry Alexander Wise. Over the next 10 months, he also served with the 59th Virginia Infantry, known as the Wise Legion or Wise Brigade, with both the 46th and 59th at Chaffin's Farm on the James River in Henrico County. (Note: Later in the war, it would be the site of the Battle of Chaffin's Farm.)

In September 1863, the Wise Brigade was ordered south to take part in the defence of Charleston, South Carolina. Chapman was commissioned to create thirty one paintings of the city's defenses by Brig. Gen. Thomas Jordan, chief of staff to commanding Gen. P. G. T. Beauregard. This was part of a campaign by Beauregard to increase support for his ideas about the defense of the harbor in the Confederate government. Chapman served in the city from early September 1863 to March 1864. He intended to paint the entire series in Charleston, but having received word of his mother's illness, Chapman was granted furlough in April 1864 and left for Rome, Italy to visit his family. It is there that he painted 25 works—with five also done by his father—from sketches he made in Charleston.

Chapman created art while he was on active duty during the war. While there were several artists on the Union side who captured the war in painting, who were also active, this was not the case on the Confederate side. His works may be the only set of battle subjects painted by a Confederate artist during the war.

After the end of the American Civil War, unable to reconcile to the Confederacy's loss, Chapman traveled to Mexico where he painted a series of views of the Valley of Mexico. He also spent time in France and England. In 1898, his entire collection of paintings went on view at the Union League Club in New York, where they attracted attention, but no buyers. He then moved his family to Richmond where the following year he sold 31 paintings to the Confederate Memorial Literary Society, which later became the Museum of the Confederacy and is now the American Civil War Museum.

== Gallery ==
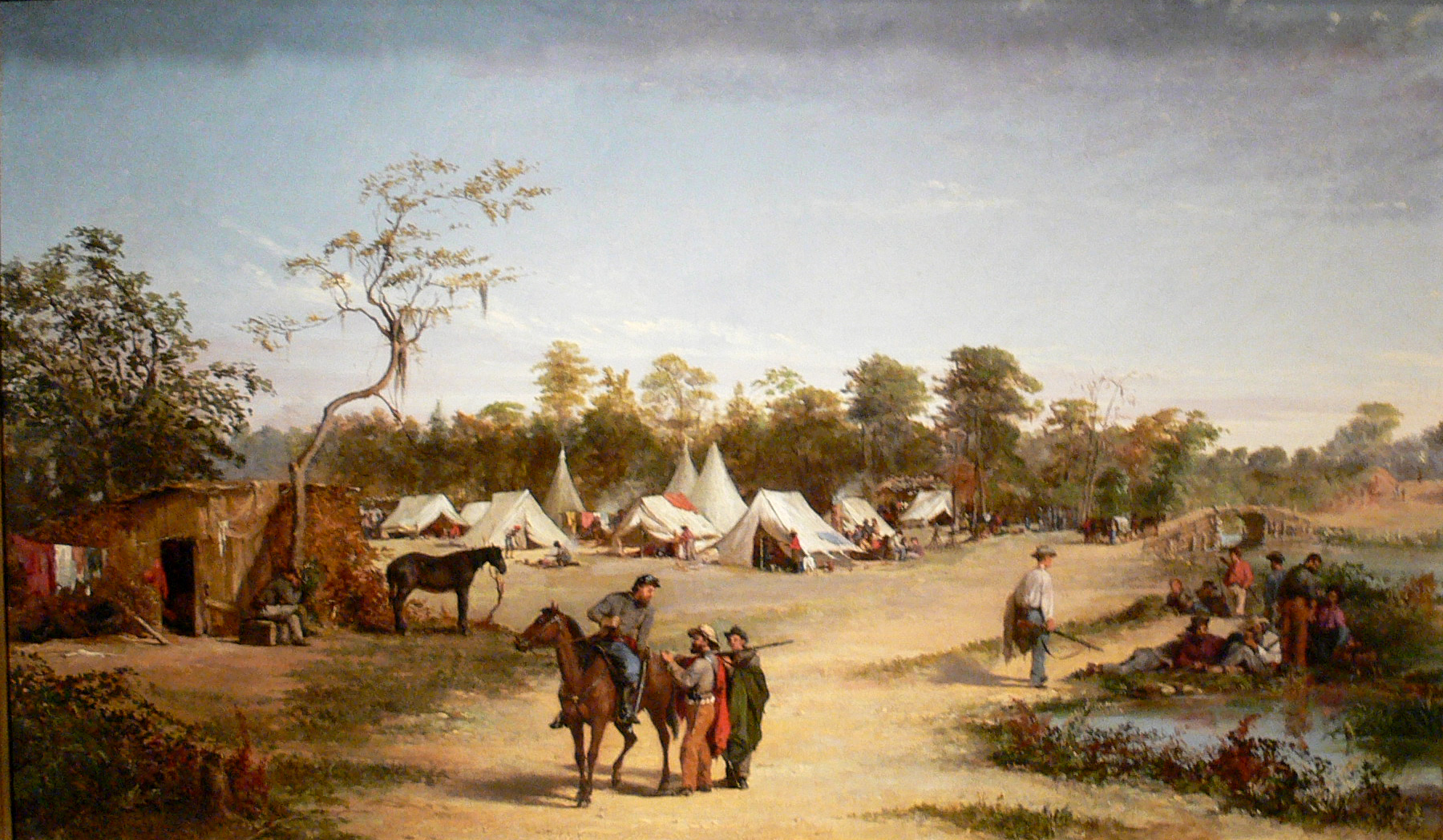
The 59th Virginian Infantry, Amon Carter Museum

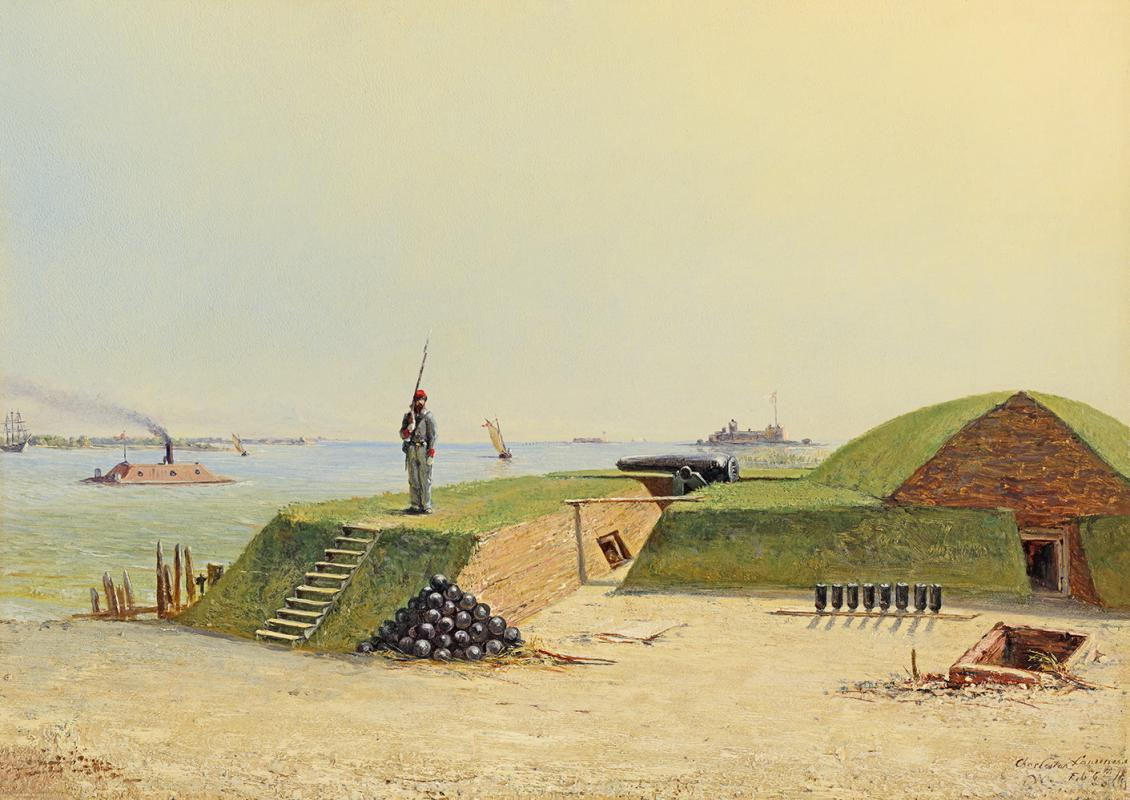
Battery Laurens Street Charleston, Feb. 7, 1864, American Civil War Museum

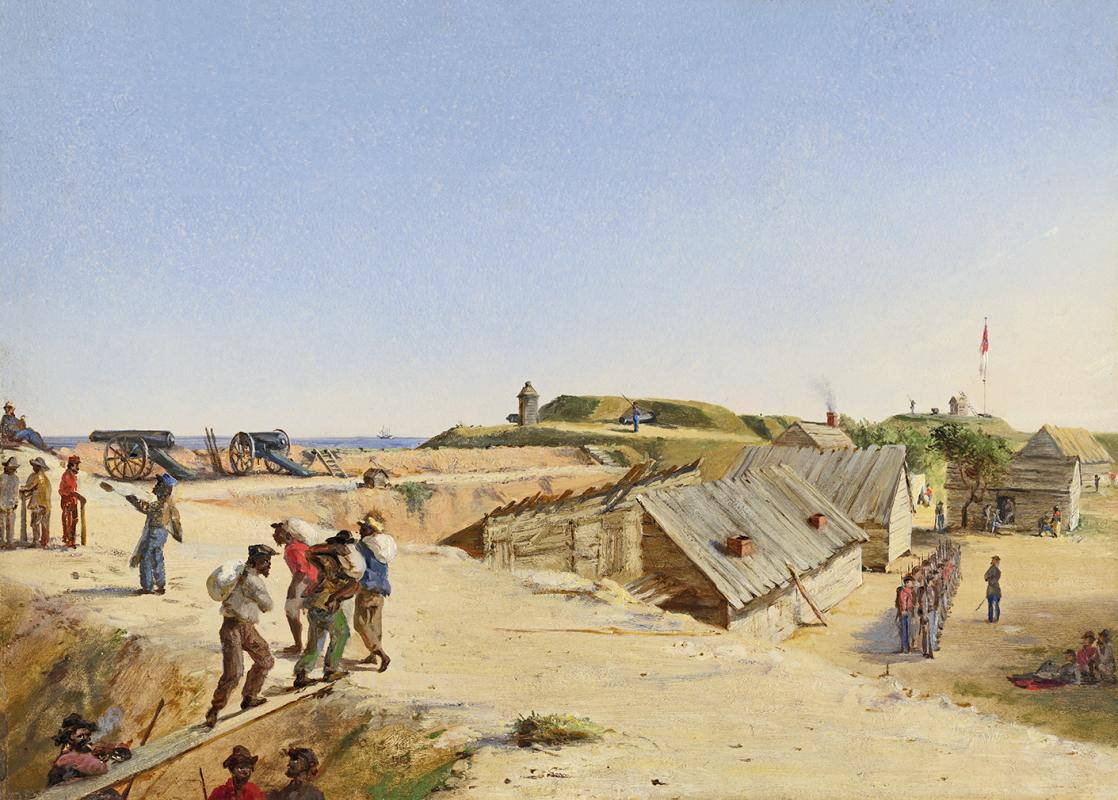
Battery Marshall, Sullivan's Island, Dec. 4, 1863, American Civil War Museum

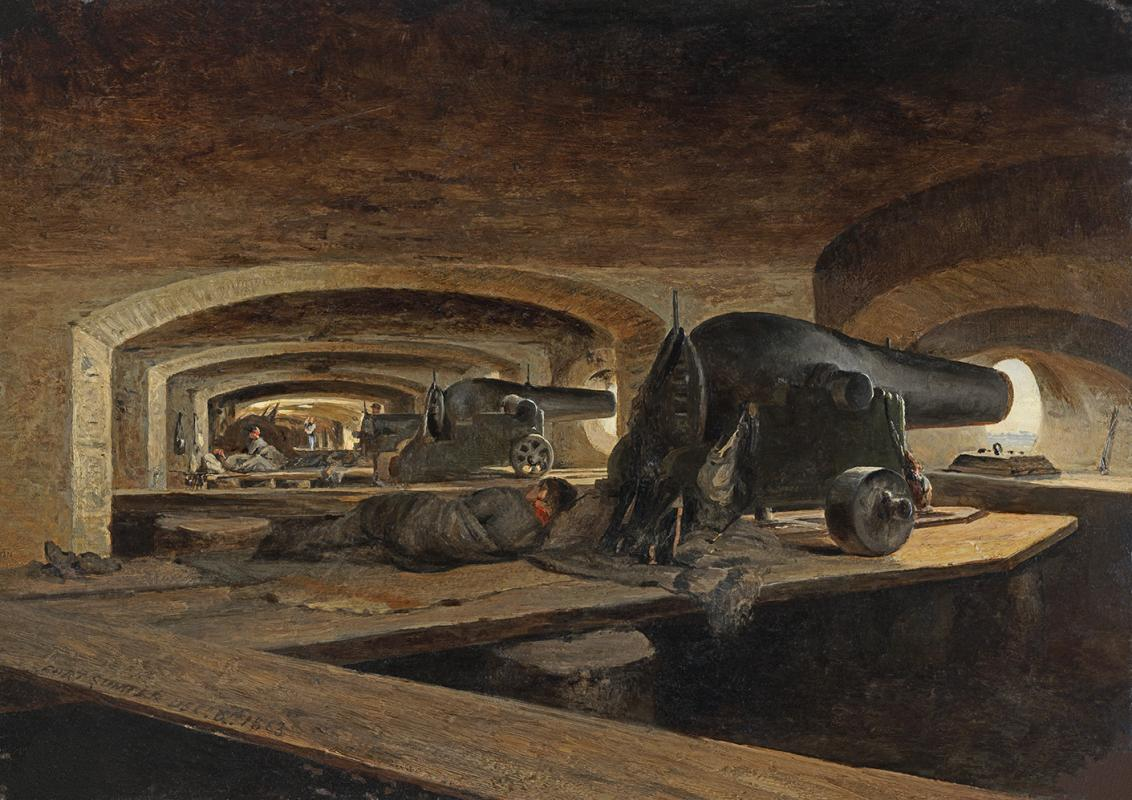
Fort Sumter Gun Gallery, Dec. 8, 1863, American Civil War Museum

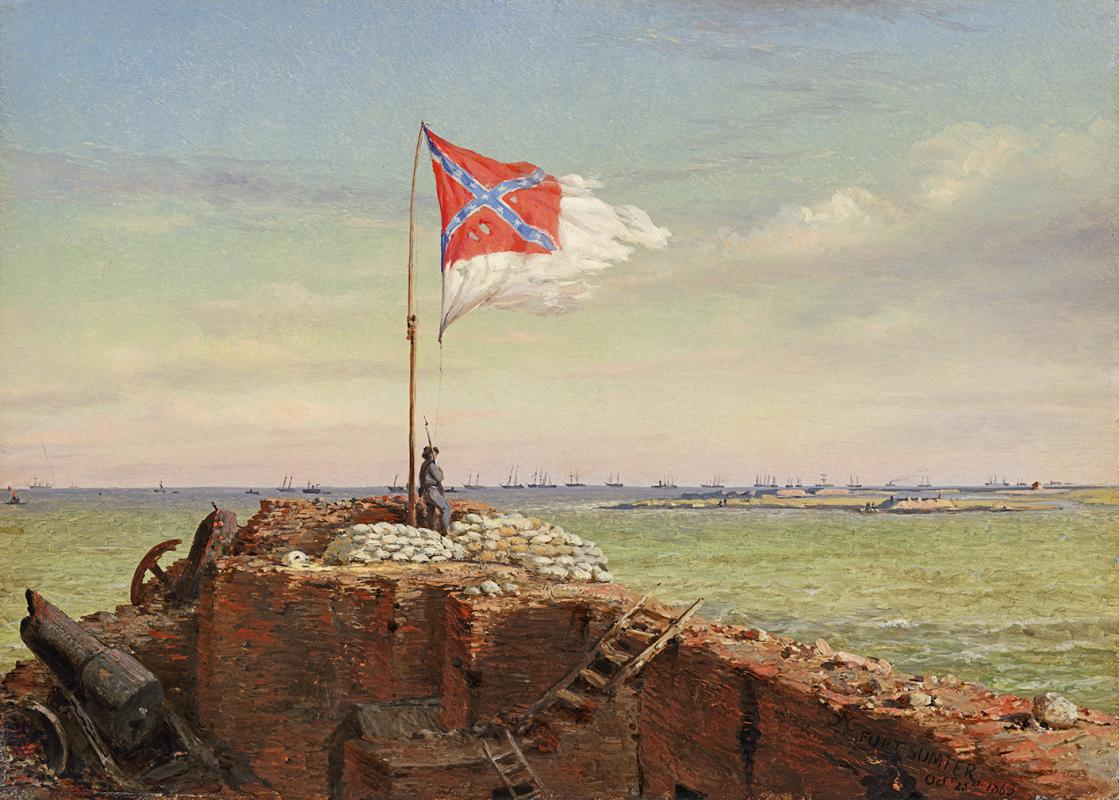
The Flag of Sumter, Oct. 20, 1863, American Civil War Museum

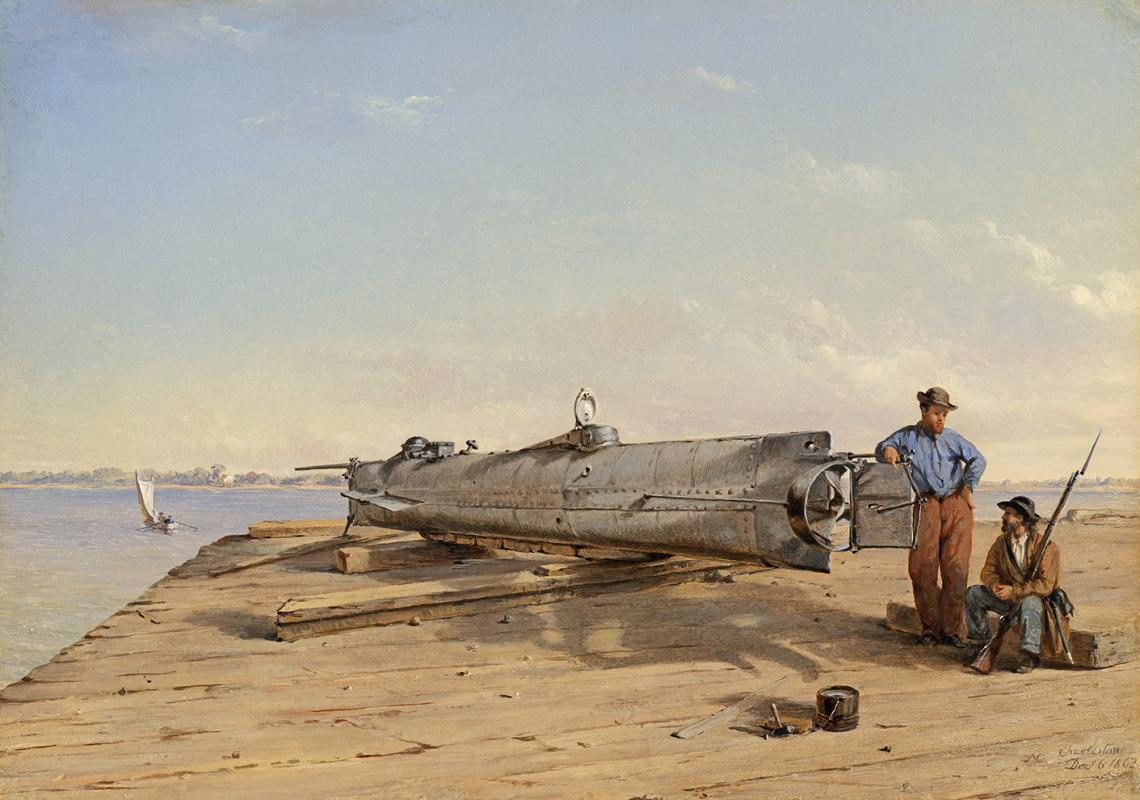
Submarine Torpedo Boat H.L. Hunley, Dec. 6, 1863, American Civil War Museum

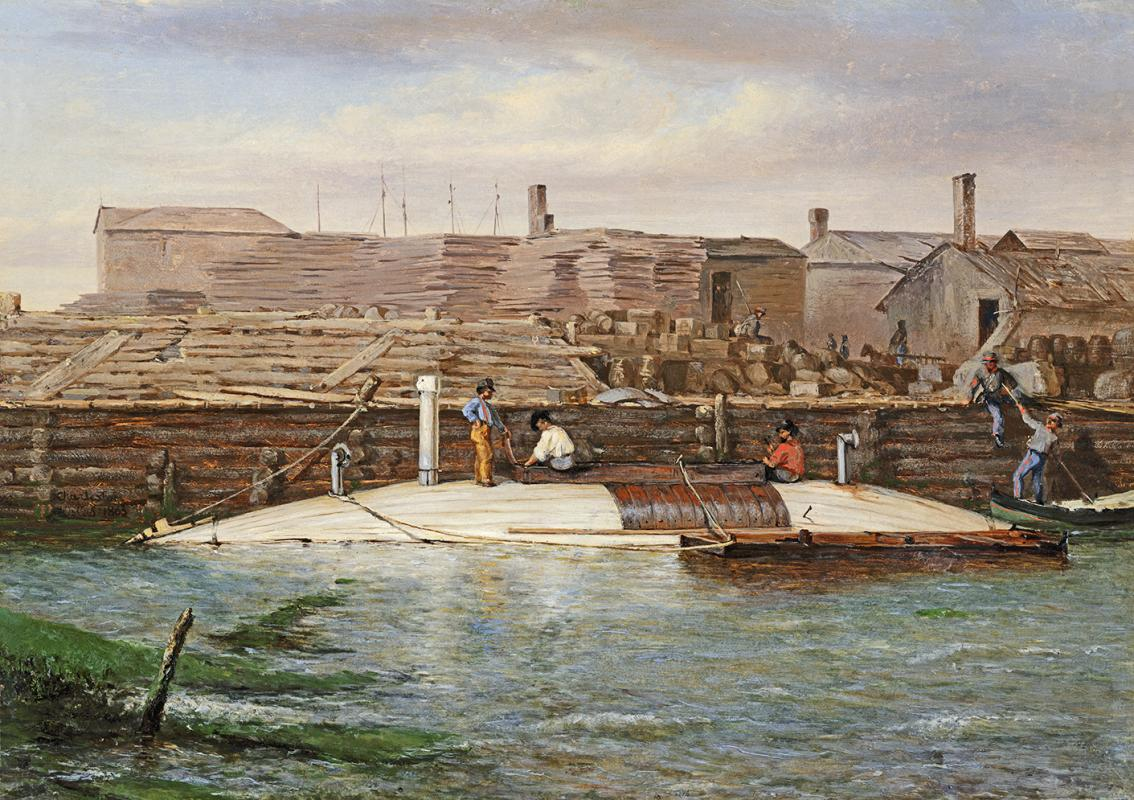
Torpedo Boat David at Charleston Dock, Oct. 25, 1863, American Civil War Museum

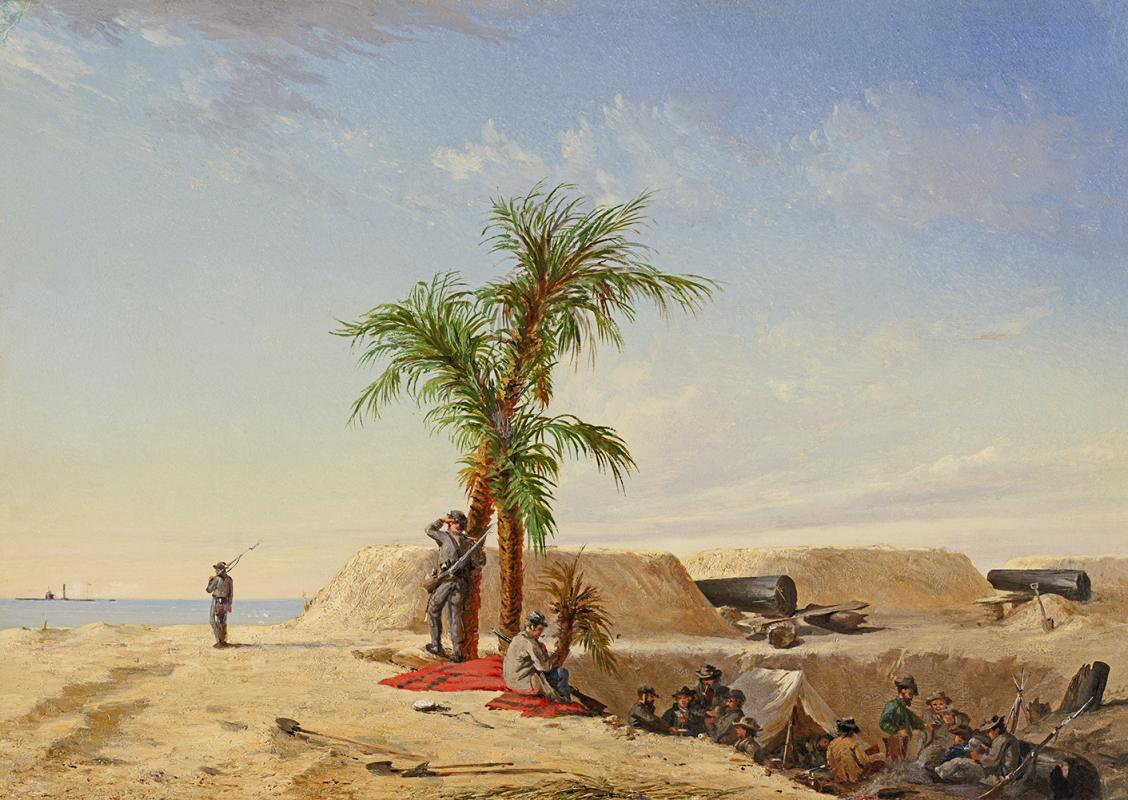
Quaker Battery, 1864, American Civil War Museum

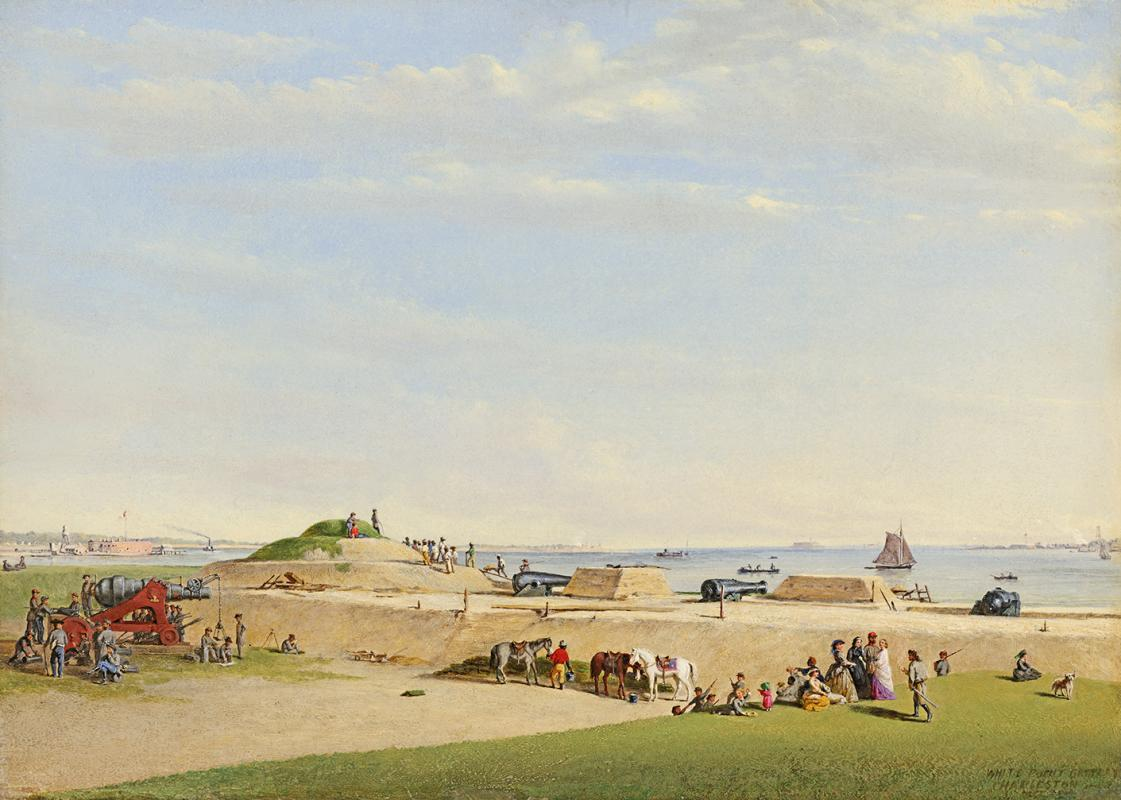
White Point Battery Charleston, Dec. 24, 1863, American Civil War Museum

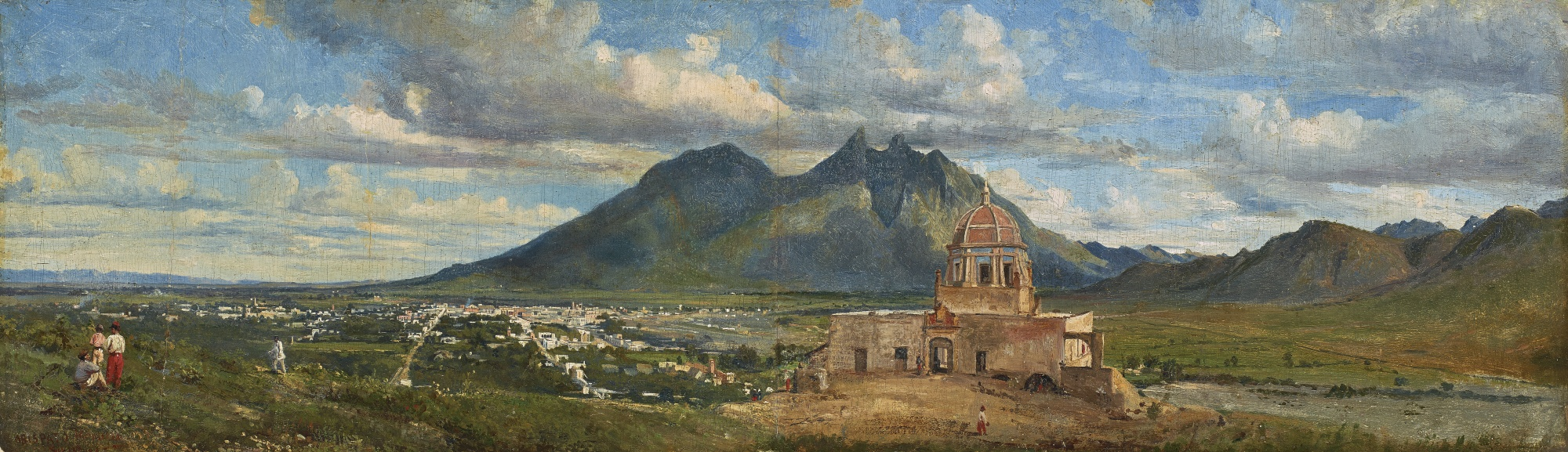
View of Bishop's Palace near Monterrey, Private collection
