= John Linton Chapman =

American painter (1839–1905)

- Born: 1839; Washington, D.C., US
- Died: May 2, 1905 (aged 65–66); Westchester County, New York
- Occupations: Painter; photographer

John Linton Chapman (1839 – May 2, 1905) was an American painter and photographer. The son of the painter John Gadsby Chapman, he and his family moved to Rome in 1850, where he and his brother Conrad studied art under their father. There, Chapman began producing paintings of Italian peasants, scenes, and landscapes. Although described as a talented painter, he was also "lazy and unambitious" and made a living selling repeated versions of the same works. He left Rome and returned to the United States in 1878, where he lived in poverty due to his exorbitant spending and lack of ambition. He died in Westchester County, New York, on May 2, 1905, divorced and destitute.

== Biography ==
John Linton Chapman was born in Washington, D.C., in 1839. His father, John Gadsby Chapman, and younger brother, Conrad Wise Chapman, were also painters. Chapman was named after one of his father's first patrons. In the spring of 1848, the Chapman family left America for Europe, staying in London, Paris, and Florence before settling in Rome in 1850. Chapman and his brother Conrad both studied art under their father. In 1858 and 1859, two writers for the art magazine The Crayon noted the boys' potential; the first highlighted Chapman's "vigor" and "fine feeling for color", while the second wrote that Chapman and his brother were "rapidly preparing to take [their father's] place in the first rank of American painters".

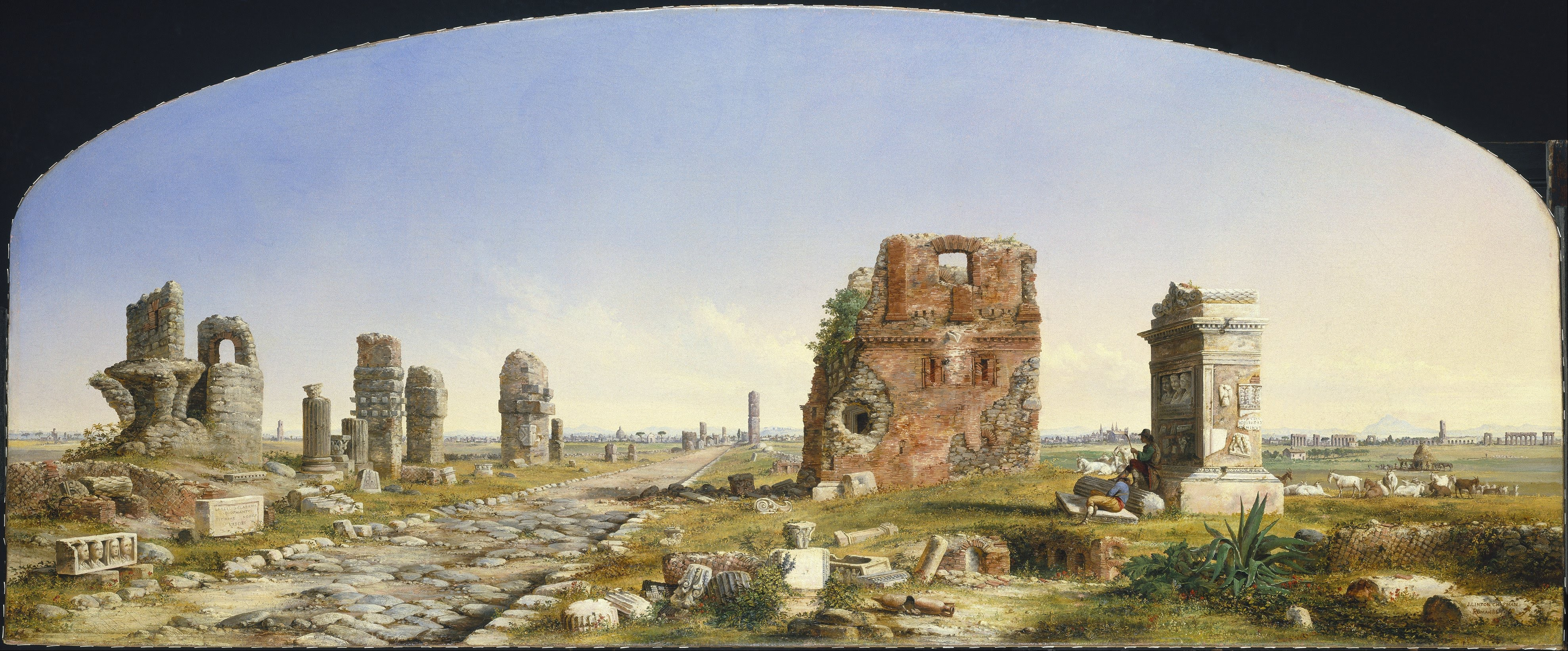
The Appian Way, 1869

While living in Rome, Chapman frequently produced and sold paintings of Italian peasants, scenes, and landscapes. One of his more common subjects was the Via Appia, of which he created numerous versions. He was also skilled in photography, which he practiced in Rome. Conrad left Italy to serve in the Confederate Army; after the end of the war, he and Chapman planned to open a photography business in Mexico, but nothing came of their plans. Instead, Chapman stayed in Italy and continued to paint.

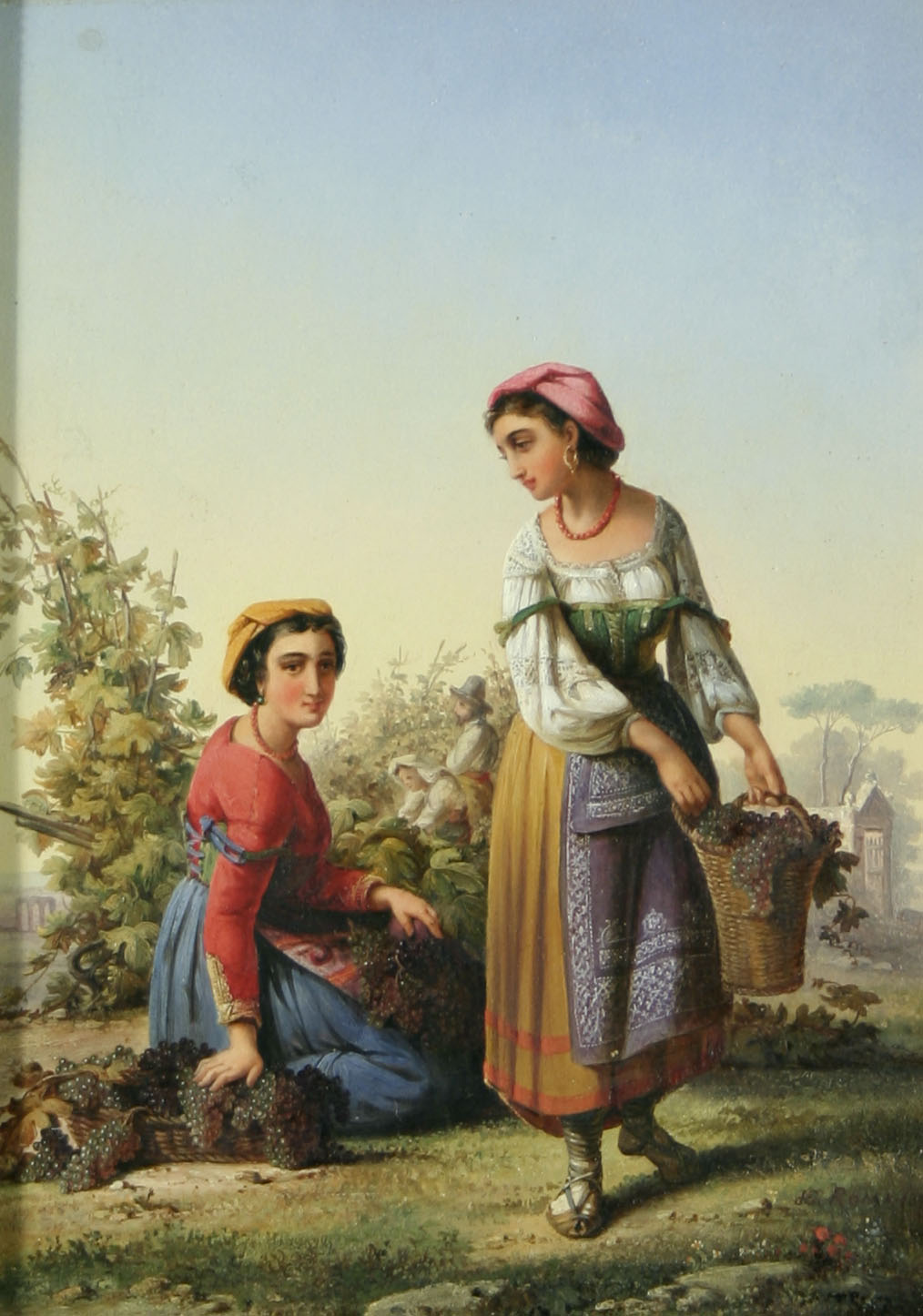
Roman Women, 1873

In 1878, Chapman left Italy and moved to New York, living in the city and its environs for the remainder of his life. He married at one point, but the marriage failed and the couple divorced. Chapman was noted for living well beyond his means and spent most of his life in poverty, with a friend of his commenting that he seemed incapable of taking care of himself. Chapman illustrated one of the author John Sergeant Wise's books, Diomed: The Life, Travels, and Observations of a Dog, published in 1897; Wise later described him harshly, labeling him "lazy and unambitious" despite his "very decided artistic talent". He also lamented the fact that Chapman continued to paint the same paintings repeatedly in order to sell them as potboilers, as well as the fact that he had sold his father and brother's valuable paintings to make a living.

Chapman continued to live impoverished in New York, painting Italian and American scenes, until his death in Westchester County, New York, on May 2, 1905. It took months for his brother to raise the funds needed to bury him next to their father. Although Chapman is remembered as a talented painter, he is also known for his prodigal lifestyle and lack of ambition that contributed to his destitution.
