= Susan Rigby Dallam Morgan =

American poet

Susan Rigby Dallam Morgan (September 9, 1810 – June 3, 1887) was an American author and poet.

== Life and career ==
Susan Ribgy Dallam was born in Harford County, Maryland to Dr. William M. Dallam and Frances Smith, the eldest of six children. Her mother died when Susan was 20 years old, and the responsibility of taking care of her younger siblings fell to her.

In 1833, Dallam Morgan wrote an anonymous poem regarding a visit to the grave of the Female Stranger which was published in the Alexandria Gazette. She also wrote a guest column for the Philadelphia Saturday Courier, using the pen name "Lucy Seymour." Her writings contributed to the widely publicized legend of the Female Stranger. Dallam Morgan was a guest columnist and wrote short stories for periodicals including The Baltimore Monument, The Boston Evening Gazette, The Saturday Morning Visitor, and The Methodist Protestant.

In 1836, her book, The Swiss Heiress, Or, The Bride of Destiny: A Tale, was critiqued by Edgar Allan Poe in a review for the Southern Literary Messenger. In his review, he wrote "[it] should be read by all who have nothing better to do."

=== Marriage ===
On March 26, 1840, she married Lyttleton Morgan who served as chaplain to the U.S. House of Representatives and as first chairman of the board of trustees of Morgan State University. Shortly after her death, Lyttleton published a book containing over 90 of her poems.

== Death ==
Dallam Morgan died in Baltimore in 1887 and is buried in Green Mount Cemetery.

== Bibliography ==
=== Books ===
- The Swiss Heiress, Or, The Bride of Destiny: A Tale, 1836.
- The Polish Orphan, Or, Vicissitudes: A Tale, 1838
- The Haunting Shadow, 1848

=== Poetry ===
- The Female Stranger, 1834.
- The Poems of Mrs. Lyttleton F. Morgan, with a Memoir by her Husband, 1888.

=== Short stories ===
- The Young Statesman, Or, Code of Honor, 1839
- Sister Ellen
- An Old Man's Story
- The Art of Shining
- The Deserter, a Tale of the Revolution
- Moral Ophthalmy
