= John Gadsby (tavern keeper) =

American tavern keeper (1766–1844)

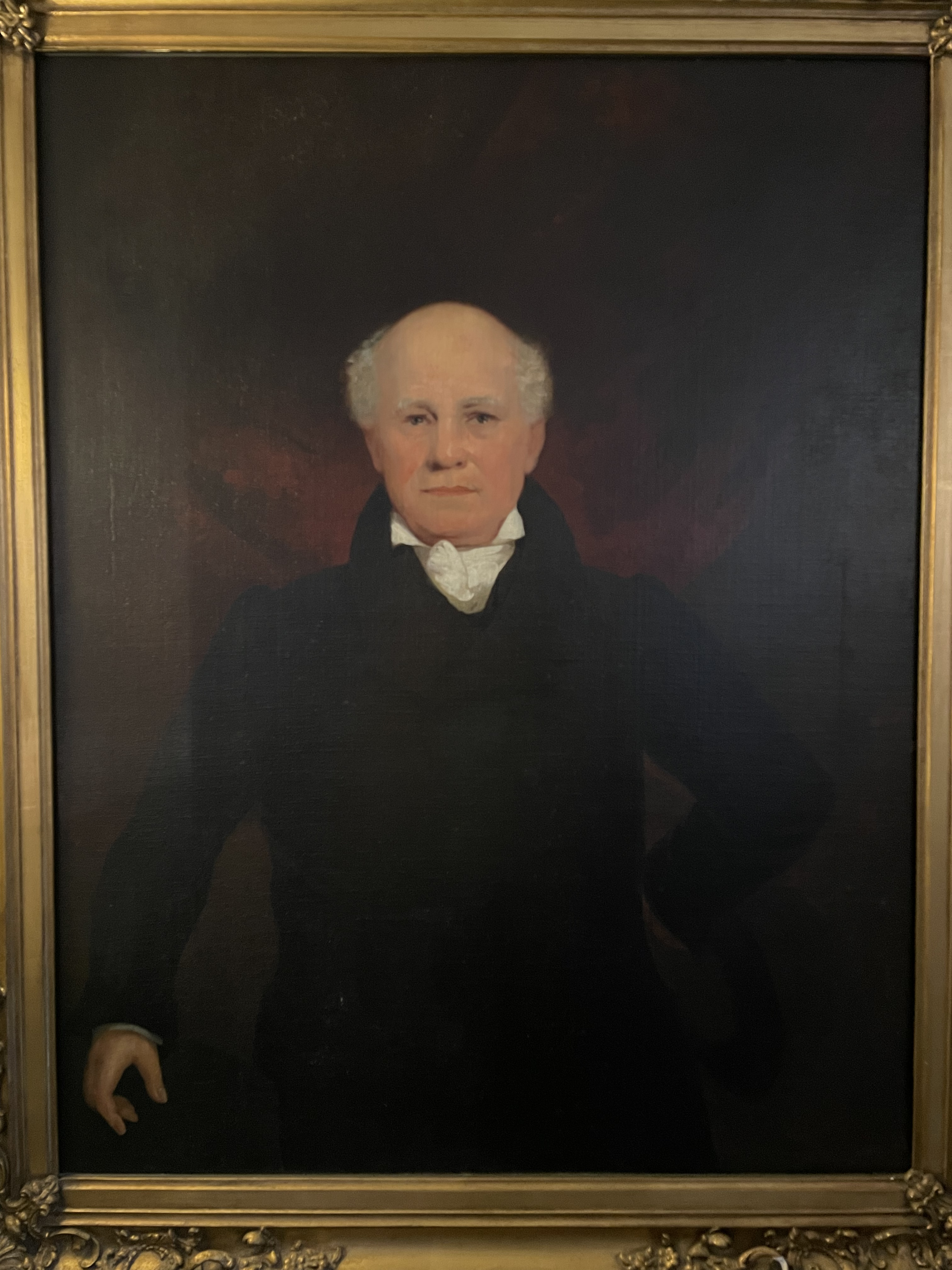
- portrait by his grandson John Gadsby Chapman
- Born: Possibly Brighton, Essex County, England
- Died: May 15, 1844 (aged 78); Washington, D.C., United States
- Occupations: tavernkeeper, hosteller and businessman
- Spouse(s): Margaret Smelt (?-1805?, her death); Margaret "Peggy" McLaughlin (1805-1812, her death) Providence "Provey" (Norris) Langworthy (m. 1813)

John Gadsby (1766 – 15 May 1844) was an English tavernkeeper in Alexandria, Baltimore, and Washington, D.C.

== Early life and migration to Alexandria ==
Born in 1766 in England, John Gadsby's earliest known record in the United States is in 1795. He traveled with his wife, Margaret Smelt, and his two daughters, Ann Sophia and Margaret Sarah, to Alexandria, Virginia, then a major shipping port.

His first establishment was at the Union Tavern and Coffee House in Alexandria, a subscription coffee house that catered to business men in the middle and upper classes.

== City Hotel ==
On October 6, 1796, Gadsby leased the City Hotel from John Wise, now the site of Gadsby's Tavern Museum in Alexandria. The tavern quickly became the center for community events, from the George Washington birthnight ball to dancing assemblies to meetings of local clubs, particularly the Alexandria Jockey Club of which Gadsby was a benefactor. He made money renting his carriages and investing in a stagecoach line.

When he renegotiated his lease, Gadsby's property and possessions totaled $22,441. His most valuable "possessions" were the enslaved African-Americans who comprised the majority of his staff.

By 1805, Gadsby's first wife Margaret had died, and he married Peggy McLaughlin of Georgetown. He then quickly married off his daughters. First, Margaret Sarah Gadsby was married to Charles Thomas Chapman in 1807, and the couple had a son, John Gadsby Chapman, by 1808. In July of that year Ann Sophia Gadsby married Augustine Newton.

Though at that point Gadsby still had eight years remaining on his lease with John Wise, he abruptly sold it and moved to Baltimore, possibly for economic opportunity.

== Indian Queen Hotel ==
The Indian Queen Hotel, at Hanover and Baltimore Streets, was a sizeable tavern that showed off new mechanical innovations, including a steam kitchen, stew stove, patent oven, and smoke jacks to move a large coffee roaster and mechanical spits. In addition to his tavern's position as a stagecoach station on four lines, this hostelry par excellence brought Gadsby both a fortune and an excellent reputation in Baltimore. Guest Samuel Breck wrote:

We alighted at the Indian Queen in Market Street, John Gadsby in a style exceeding anything that I recollect to have seen in Europe or America. This inn is so capacious that it accommodates two hundred lodgers, and has two splendid billiard-rooms, large stables and many other appendages. The numerous bed-chambers have all bells, and the servants are more attentive than in any public or private house I ever knew.

On May 10, 1808, Gadsby and Peggy had a son, William. But on February 12, 1812, Peggy died, and a short 11 months later, Gadsby married Providence "Provey" (Norris) Langworthy, twenty years his junior. The Norris family was prominent in Baltimore and attended numerous events at the Indian Queen Hotel. The patriarch of the family, Provey's father Benjamin Bradford Norris, was significant in town for being a signer of the Bush Declaration. The couple had three children in Baltimore: Virginia (1813), Augusta (1816), and Julia (1818). They also had a son, Charles, who died as a young child.

Of the many notable guests Gadsby welcomed before, during, and after the Battle of Baltimore, Francis Scott Key would become the most significant. Key finished his song the "Defence of Fort McHenry," now better known as "The Star-Spangled Banner," at the Indian Queen on September 16, 1814.

During the Panic of 1819, Gadsby sold his lease and left Baltimore nearly penniless. The reasons behind his financial downfall are unsure.

Gadsby looked toward Washington Hall Hotel in Philadelphia, the next stop on his stagecoach line to the north, for his next venture. He was in negotiations to take over the hotel, but its loss by fire rendered his plans moot. Instead he looked to the next stagecoach stop to the south: Franklin Hotel in Washington, D.C.

== Franklin Hotel ==
In 1824, Gadsby bought up the Franklin Hotel, which had a reputation for hosting the most distinguished men in the nation as they visited Washington. Quickly, the Franklin Hotel became known as Gadsby's Hotel.

By 1826, Gadsby's Hotel boasted a billiard room and an extensive coach house as well as parlors, private suites, and rooms for dozens of men. Not all visitors were impressed, however; Lukas Vischer, a Swiss traveler, chronicled the following:

This inn passes for the foremost in the metropolis. Gadsby ... in Baltimore ... went bankrupt, and now truly starveling conditions reign in his house. All is aimed at pretense. Five chafing-dishes permanently decorate the table; butter and occasionally radish is put upon them. The lunch consisted of a poor soup and two main dishes, roast beef and ham, roast veal and fish, and so on; vegetables scarcely sufficient for 2 or 3 persons, almost every day fried chicken which in fact are parched cocks with really not the least to gnaw off ... Gadsby is a scoundrel who want to do it right by making empty compliments ...

Since the carriage ride from the Franklin to the Capitol took forty minutes, the location was not ideal and Gadsby looked elsewhere. The Franklin Hotel became a rental property, and Gadsby began to deal in the real estate business with other private dwellings.

== National Hotel ==
The grand dining rooms, premier ballrooms, and private suites of the National Hotel, located on Pennsylvania Avenue at Sixth Street, hosted presidents, foreign ministers, congressmen, and prominent travelers. The hotel was originally a series of rowhouses which Gadsby converted into one and contained several stores under the same roof: a bank, a stage office, a wine store, and a lottery office. Two years after the grand opening – the February 22, 1827, George Washington Birthnight Ball at which President John Quincy Adams and most of his administration was present – the hotel was still under construction.

By all accounts, the hotel could accommodate several hundred people. A large number of Congressmen resided at Gadsby's Hotel for the season, mostly Congressmen from Massachusetts and South Carolina. Some lived at Gadsby's for as many as seven years. Andrew Jackson stayed at the National Hotel before his inauguration.

In 1830, Gadsby owned 39 slaves and employed 4 free black women.

Jonathan Elliot praised Gadsby's individualism and perseverance as a businessman as his personal charm:

Mr. Gadsby, who superintends indefatigably and courteously, possesses ample experience and peculiar skill in his profession. His spirit of enterprise, liberal system, and moderate charges, and the various conveniences and attractions which are combined in his Hotel, form very strong claims upon the patronage of travelers, and deserve to be widely made known through the press.

In 1835, Gadsby's daughter Augusta married John Hollins McBlair, a grocer and eventual army officer. Another of his daughters, Virginia, died in July 1836 at the age of 20. She was much lamented in the local papers, where she was remembered as her kindred's "centre of light and life."

== Retirement to Decatur House ==
Gadsby retired in September 1836 at the age of 70, leaving the business to his son William. He bought Decatur House, one of the largest residences in DC that had a history of grand entertaining, for $12,000 at auction on October 24, 1836.

Ten slaves moved with the Gadsbys from the National Hotel to Decatur House. Two families of slaves, the Kings and the Williams, lived in the two-story structure added to the property by the Gadsbys, one of the few extant examples of urban slave quarters. In addition, an enslaved African American named Rosa Marks lived there even through emancipation, and is now buried in the family vault. Occupants of the house included John and Provey, unmarried daughter Julia, married daughter Augusta (with her husband and children), and a young cousin, Mary Augusta Bruff. In 1845, Julia married well to John Conover Ten Eyck who went on to serve as a US Senator from New Jersey.

Two sources describe Gadsby as a slave trader who had a private jail where he housed the enslaved prior to transport for resale in the lower South. Sarah E. Vedder wrote of the jail in her 1909 memoirs of a long life in the District: "This brings us to the crab apple and hawthorne hedge I have mentioned before; also to the jail, or ell, where Gadsby kept his negroes until they were sold to Georgia. It was a long, one-story brick, with windows barred with iron, and sometimes at night you could hear their howls and cries. The Gadsbys lived on the corner of H and Eighteenth streets, and kept a very large hotel on Pennsylvania avenue, near Four and a half street. It was the first-class hotel in the city. Their dwelling, on the corner, was a large, square, brick, with balconies of iron at the windows above and below."

Gadsby died on May 15, 1844, at the age of 78 and was buried in Congressional Cemetery. He was remembered as a "well-respected and useful citizen."

His wife, Provey, died in 1858, operating Decatur House as a boarding house before her death.
