= John Gadsby Chapman =

American painter

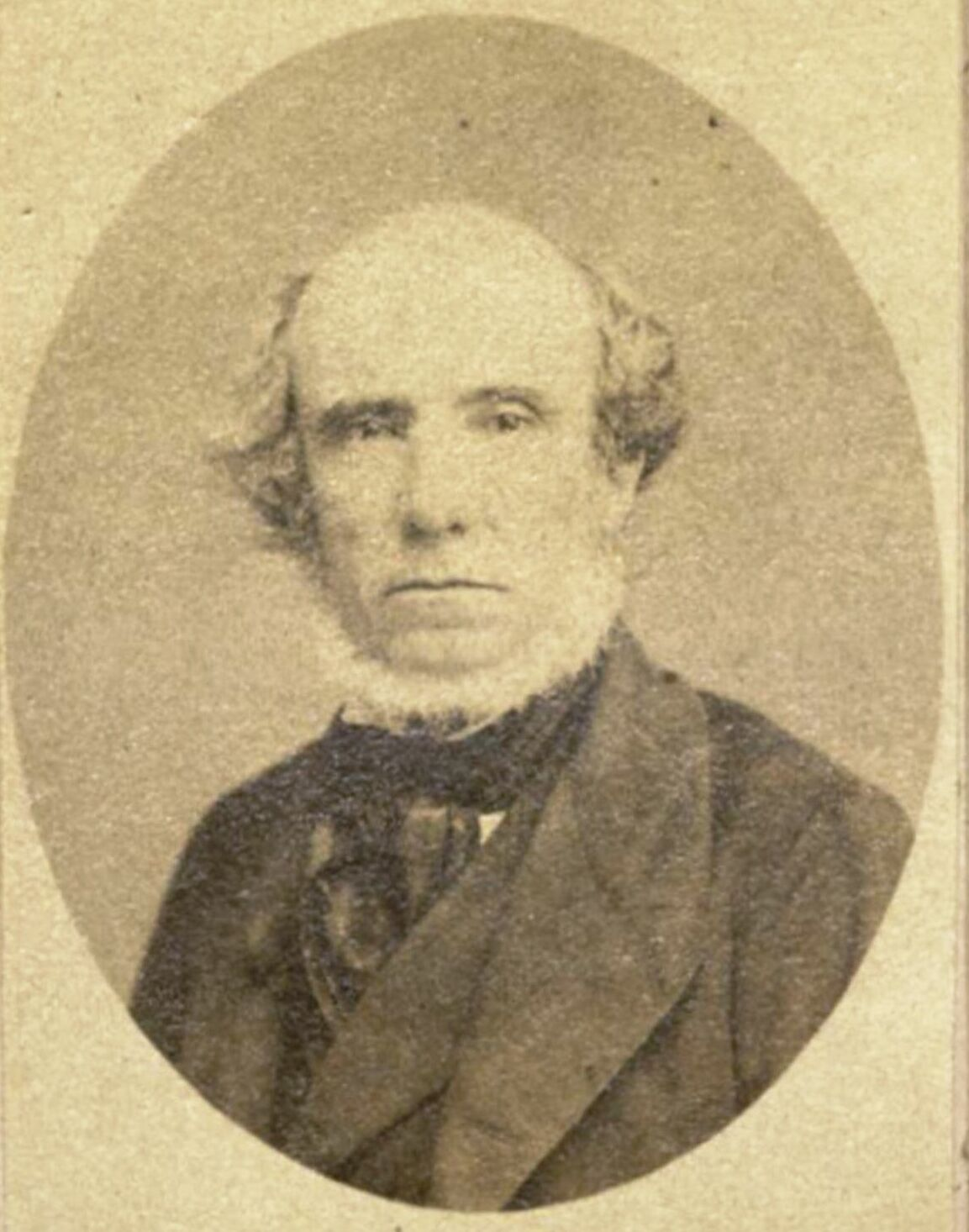
- Born: August 11, 1808; Alexandria
- Died: November 28, 1889; Brooklyn
- Occupation: artist
- Children: Conrad Wise Chapman

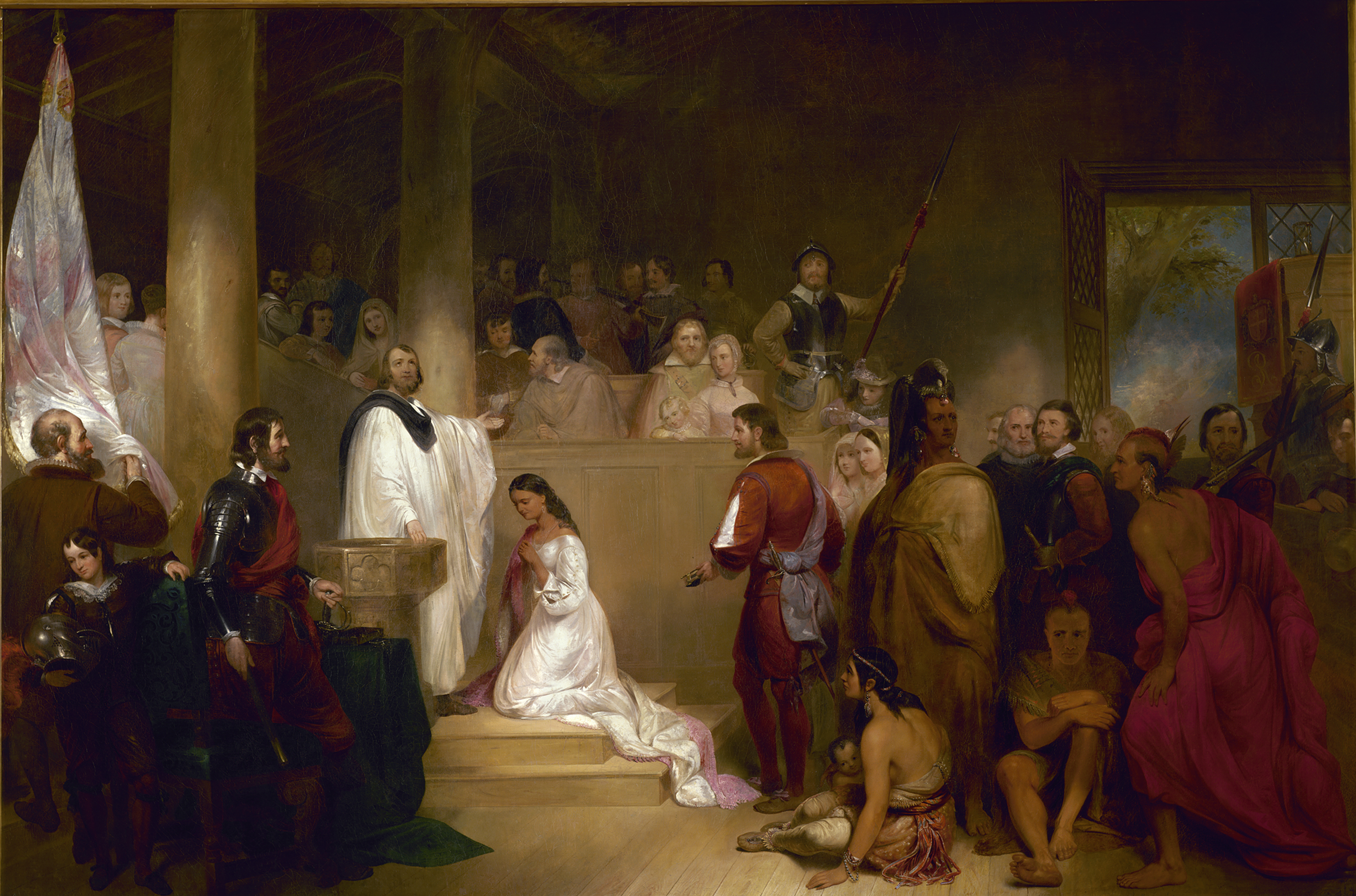
Baptism of Pocahontas by John G. Chapman, 1840.

John Gadsby Chapman (December 3, 1808 – November 28, 1889) was an American artist famous for Baptism of Pocahontas, which was commissioned by the United States Congress and hangs in the United States Capitol rotunda.

== Life and career ==
A grandson of famed tavernkeeper John Gadsby, John Chapman was born in 1808 in Alexandria, Virginia. Chapman began his study of art in Philadelphia for two years, then departed for Europe where he eventually spent time in Italy. In 1831, Chapman returned to his hometown of Alexandria, and exhibited his artwork in the nearest metropolitan areas, such as Washington, D.C., Richmond, and Philadelphia. He specialized in landscapes and portraits.

By 1834, Chapman had moved to New York City and become a member of the National Academy of Design, and found work as an illustrator. In New York, Chapman embarked on a series of historical paintings, such as Landing at Jamestown and the Crowning of Powhatan. Between 1833 and 1860, the National Academy exhibited 100 of his paintings – twenty-one in 1836 alone. The success of these paintings helped Chapman land a commission from the United States Congress in February 1837 to paint a historical scene for the rotunda of the Capitol building. For this work, Chapman received a total payment of $10,000. On November 30, 1840, Baptism of Pocahontas was formally unveiled in the Capitol rotunda.

Besides historical paintings and portraits, Chapman also produced wood engravings and etchings, and frequently contributed illustrations to Harper Brothers' publications. Chapman's American Drawing Book, published in 1847, became a standard text for art students. Fifteen of his paintings were engraved and featured in The Token and Atlantic Souvenir annual gift book, making him the second-most featured American artist in that publication. Historian David S. Lovejoy classified these contributions as exhibiting a "sentimental genre of a nauseous nature".

On the swell of these successes, Chapman moved his family to Rome, and made an earnest living selling paintings of rural Campania to American visitors. However, at the onset of the American Civil War, the tourist industry dried up, affecting Chapman's fortunes greatly. In addition, Chapman's own son, Conrad Wise Chapman, returned to America to fight on the side of the Confederate States of America.

The economic deprivation inflicted on Chapman during the 1860s became insurmountable. In Rome, he was forced to live off the kindness of fellow expatriates, and finally returned to America, sick and poor, to spend his last days with another son, John Linton Chapman, in Brooklyn, New York. It was there, in 1889, that he died a pauper.

== Publications ==
- The Elements of Art: A Manual for the Amateur, and Basis of Study for the Professional Artist (1848)
