= Lyttleton Morgan =

American academic, preacher and university administrator

- Born: June 10, 1813; Bath County, Virginia, U.S.
- Died: February 28, 1895 (aged 81); Baltimore, Maryland, U.S.
- Resting place: Green Mount Cemetery; Baltimore, Maryland, U.S.
- Occupations: Preacher; Chairman of the board of trustees of Centenary Biblical Institute; Chaplain of the United States House of Representatives
- Spouse: Susan Rigby Dallam Morgan (m. 1840; died 1887)

Lyttleton Morgan (June 10, 1813 – February 28, 1895) was the first chairman of the board of trustees of Morgan State University, which was renamed in his honor (it was founded as the Centenary Biblical Institute).

== Career ==
Rev. Morgan was "station-preacher" meaning that he generally traveled to different churches to preach the Gospel, without having a church of his own. He had preached at every prominent church in the Baltimore Methodist Episcopal Conference. Morgan also served as chaplain to the United States House of Representatives from 1851 to 1852. He was married to Susan Rigby Dallam Morgan, a poet of the Poe era.

Morgan was buried in Green Mount Cemetery.

Morgan State University, in Baltimore, used to be the Centenary Biblical Institute of the Methodist Episcopal, but was renamed in his honor in 1890.

Religious titles
Preceded by Ralph Gurley	Chaplain of the United States House of Representatives; December 1, 1851 – December 6, 1852	Succeeded by James Gallagher
