= 17th Virginia Infantry Regiment =

- Flag of Virginia, 1861
- Active: June 1861 – Spring 1865
- Disbanded: April 1865
- Country: Confederacy
- Allegiance: Confederate States of America
- Branch: Confederate States Army
- Type: Infantry
- Engagements: First Battle of Bull Run; Seven Days' Battles; Second Battle of Bull Run; Battle of Antietam; Battle of Fredericksburg; Siege of Suffolk; Battle of Cold Harbor; Siege of Petersburg; Battle of Five Forks; Battle of Sailor's Creek

Commanders
- Notable commanders: Colonel Montgomery Dent Corse

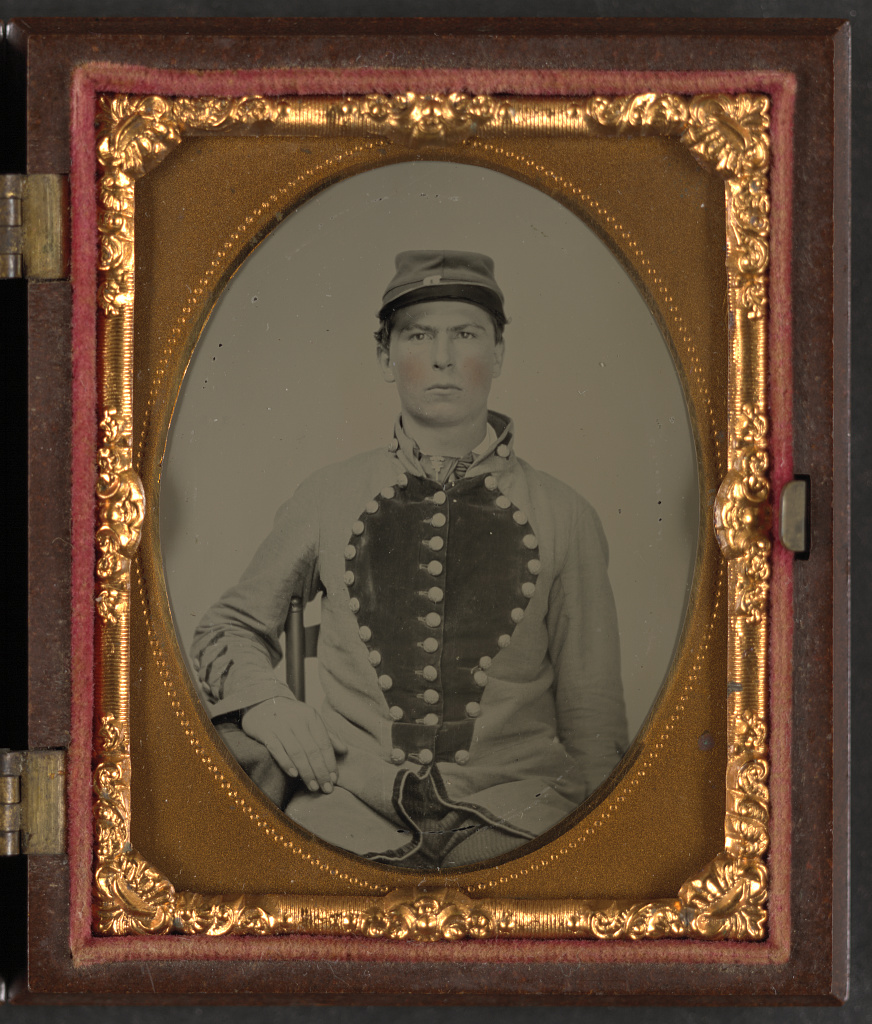
Unidentified soldier of Co. D, 17th Virginia Infantry Regiment

The 17th Virginia Infantry Regiment was an infantry regiment raised in Virginia for service in the Confederate States Army during the American Civil War. It fought mostly with the Army of Northern Virginia.

17th Infantry Regiment was organized at Manassas Junction, Virginia, in June, 1861, using the 6th Battalion Virginia Militia as its nucleus. Men of this unit were recruited in the city of Alexandria, counties of Arlington(Then called Alexandria County), Fairfax, Fauquier, Loudoun, Prince William, and Warren.

After fighting at First Manassas in a brigade under James Longstreet, it was assigned to General Ewell's, A.P. Hill's, Kemper's, and Corse's Brigade. The 17th fought with the Army of Northern Virginia from Williamsburg to Fredericksburg, then participated in Longstreet's Suffolk Expedition. During the Gettysburg Campaign it was on detached duty at Gordonsville and later served in Tennessee and North Carolina. Returning to Virginia it fought at Drewry's Bluff and Cold Harbor, saw action in the Petersburg trenches, and ended the war at Appomattox.

This regiment totaled 600 men in April, 1862, lost 17 killed and 47 wounded at Williamsburg, had 18 killed and 41 wounded at Seven Pines, and had 17 killed, 23 wounded, and 73 missing at Frayser's Farm. It reported 48 casualties at Second Manassas, 13 at South Mountain, and of the 55 engaged at Sharpsburg about seventy-five percent were disabled. At Drewry's Bluff 7 were killed and 23 wounded. Many were captured at Sayler's Creek, and 2 officers and 46 men surrendered on April 9, 1865.

The field officers were Colonels Montgomery D. Corse, Arthur Herbert, and Morton Marye; Lieutenant Colonels William Munford and Grayson Tyler; and Majors George W. Brent and Robert H. Simpson.

== See also ==
- List of Virginia Civil War units
