= St. Paul's Episcopal Church (Alexandria, Virginia) =

Historic church in Virginia, United States

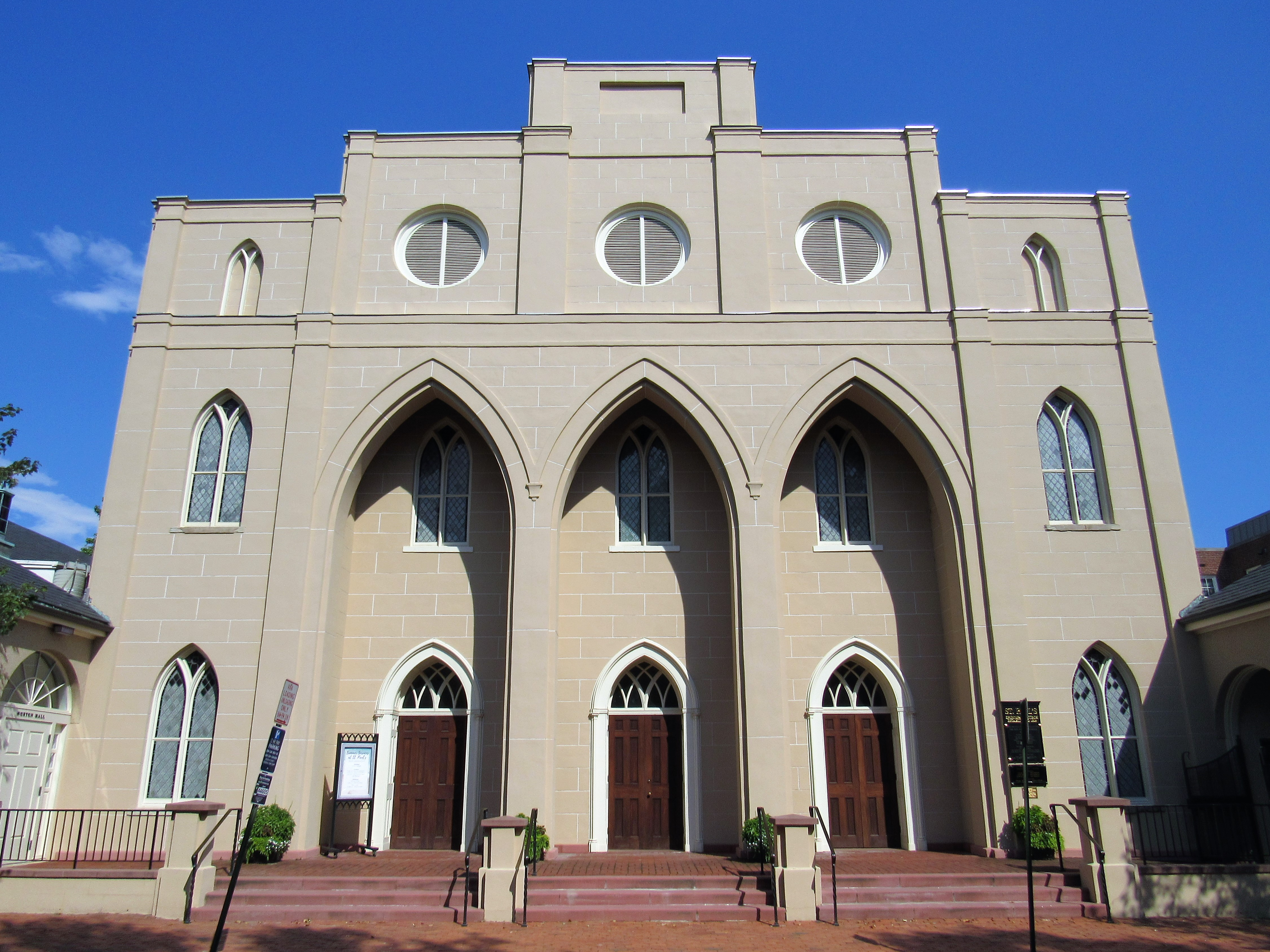
- Façade, 2019

Religion
- Affiliation: Episcopal Church in the United States of America
- Year consecrated: 1818

Location
- Location: Alexandria, Virginia
- Interactive map of St. Paul's Episcopal Church
- Coordinates: 38°48′11″N 77°2′43″W

Architecture
- Architect: Benjamin Latrobe
- Style: Gothic Revival
- General contractor: Jeremiah Bosworth
- Groundbreaking: 1817
- Completed: 1818
- Direction of façade: West

U.S. National Register of Historic Places
- Added to NRHP: 1985
- NRHP Reference no.: 85000987 (National Register Information System)
- Virginia Landmarks Register
- Designated: April 16, 1985
- Reference no.: 100-0104

Website
- www.stpaulsalexandria.com

St. Paul's Episcopal Church is an historic Episcopal church in the Anglican Communion located in the Old Town area of Alexandria, Virginia. The church, consecrated in 1818, was designed by Benjamin Latrobe, the second architect of the United States Capitol. It is one of the few buildings designed by Latrobe in a Gothic style and one of the earliest examples of Gothic Revival architecture in the United States. The church was placed on the National Register of Historic Places in 1985. During the year 2009, St. Paul's Episcopal Church celebrated the bicentennial of its founding.

== History ==
=== William Holland Wilmer and the rebuilding of the Episcopal Church in Virginia ===
During his term as rector of St. Paul's, 1812–1826, William Holland Wilmer was a major figure in the rebuilding of the Episcopal Church in Virginia in the aftermath of its disestablishment. In addition to founding St. John's Episcopal Church, Lafayette Square, in 1815, he wrote extensively on church matters, published numerous sermons on special occasions, and contributed regularly to church publications of the time including the "Washington Theological Repertory," which he founded in 1819. In recognition of his many contributions, Wilmer was awarded an honorary doctorate (D.D.) by Brown University in 1820.

In 1823, Wilmer obtained permission from the vestry to build at his own expense a small lecture room on church property at the corner of Pitt and Duke Streets. The building was used as a Sunday school, schoolhouse, and lecture room, and also as a town hall. This building was eventually purchased by the vestry and stood until 1855 when the structure was sold and plans were made for a larger replacement. A larger building in Gothic style was constructed on the same site in 1859 that was also used as a Sunday school, lecture hall and meeting place until its demolition in 1955. While serving as rector of St. Paul's, Wilmer declined calls to serve other churches: St. John's, Lafayette Square, in 1817; and Monumental Church, Richmond, Virginia, in 1826. That year, Wilmer became President of The College of William and Mary and rector of Bruton Parish Church in Williamsburg.

=== The founding of Virginia Theological Seminary ===
One of Wilmer's continuing concerns was the recruitment and education of clergy. In 1818, he founded the Society for the Education of Young Men for the Ministry of the Protestant Episcopal Church in Virginia and Maryland (Education Society). In 1823, after the Bishop of Maryland withdrew support for the Education Society and an effort to found a seminary in Williamsburg had failed, Wilmer and the Rev. Reuel Keith determined to hold classes in the St. Paul's lecture hall.

The first class of 14 young men met in the St. Paul's lecture hall that year. The founding of Virginia Theological Seminary is dated from those classes.

=== War of 1812 and saving of Alexandria ===
Wilmer was part of a three-person delegation that parleyed with British Admiral George Cockburn during the Burning of Washington to save Alexandria from destruction. As result of the negotiations, Cockburn's troops burned Alexandria's docks, seized naval stores and looted warehouses, but did not burn the town.

=== Sunday school ===
The St. Paul's Sunday school was organized in 1818. In England, Sunday schools began in order to educate the industrial poor. The schools taught reading, writing and rudiments of knowledge of the Bible and the liturgy. The Sunday school educated Negroes as well as Whites until the Virginia legislature forbad teaching reading to Negroes after Nat Turner's slave rebellion.

=== Civil War ===
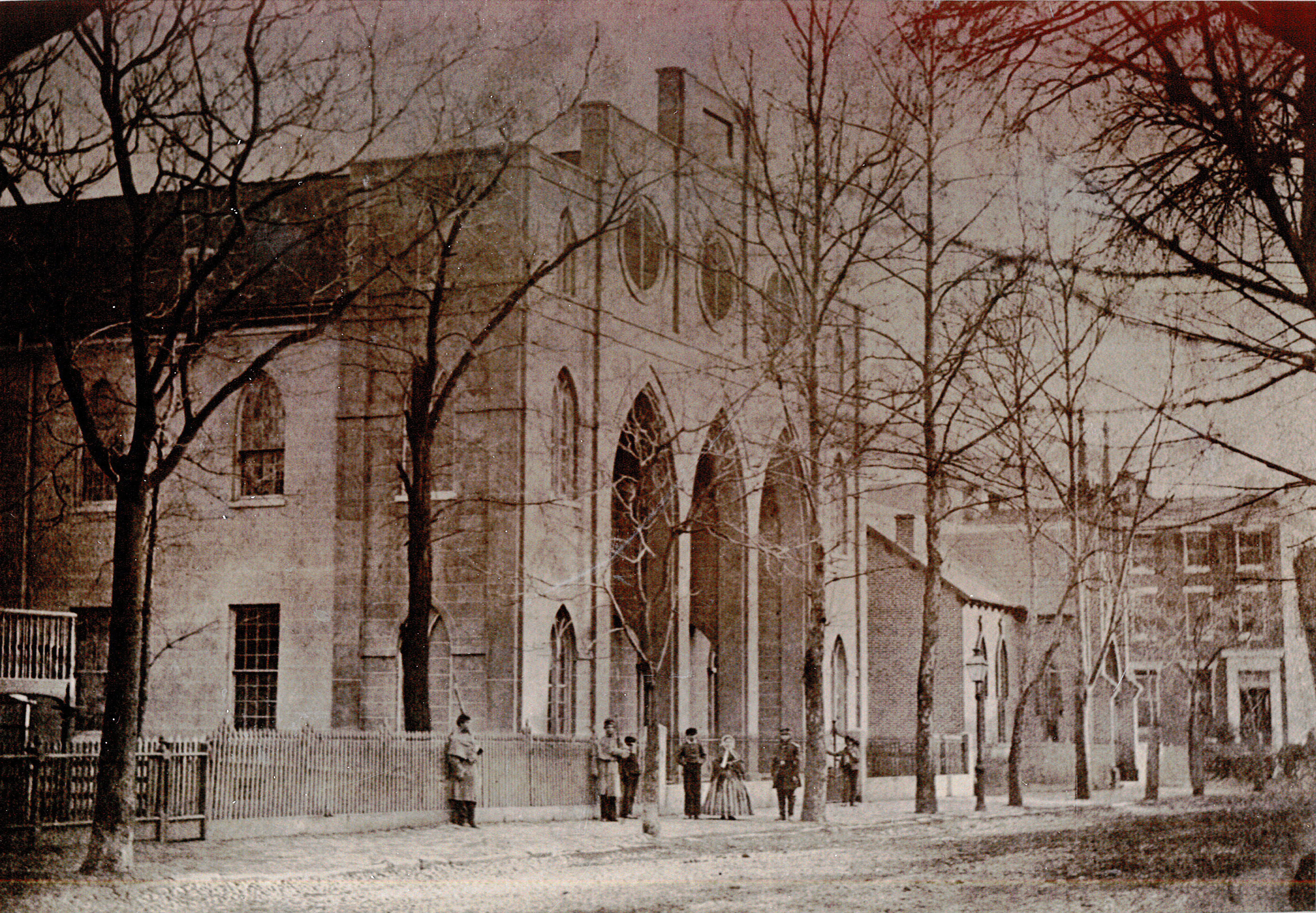
St. Paul's Church under military occupation, 1862

Virginia ceded Alexandria as part of the original organization of the District of Columbia, but demanded it back in 1846. The congregation of St. Paul's overwhelmingly supported the Confederacy after Virginia seceded from the Union. The rector at the time, George Hatley Norton, took leave to serve as chaplain with the 17th Virginia Infantry. Though he traveled to Lexington, Virginia, where he remained for the duration of the war, due to ill health, he never served with Confederate forces, but instead took the oath of allegiance to the Union imposed by the martial law authority. Some of St. Paul's most promising youth, including Randolph Fairfax, confirmed in St. Paul's, died in arms as Confederate soldiers.

Union troops occupied Alexandria immediately following the bombardment of Fort Sumter and the town remained subject to military occupation for the duration of the war, even after a loyalist Virginia government was organized in 1863. Because the prayer book service made distinct mention of both the executive and the legislative departments of the government, Episcopal clergy were exposed to embarrassment whenever any part of the territory of the Confederate States was occupied by Union forces.

An early and particularly notorious incident was the arrest of St. Paul's interim minister, the Rev. Dr. K. J. Stewart, in the sanctuary on February 9, 1862, by Union troops who attended with the stated purpose of provoking an incident. During the Litany, Dr. Stewart was ordered by an attending Union officer to say the Prayer for the President of the United States that Dr. Stewart had omitted without saying any other prayer in its place. Dr. Stewart proceeded without paying any attention to the interruption; but a captain and six of his soldiers, who were present in the congregation to provoke an incident, drew their swords and pistols, strode into the chancel, seized the clergyman while he was still kneeling, held pistols to his head, and forced him out of the church, and through the streets, just as he was, in his surplice and stole, and committed him to the guard-house of the 8th Illinois Cavalry. Dr. Stewart was soon released, but was not allowed to continue to officiate at services. Immediately thereafter, the St. Paul's sanctuary was closed and was used for the duration of the War as a hospital for the wounded.

Members with Southern sympathies from St. Paul's, and also members from Christ Church, continued to meet in the St. Paul's lecture hall until it too was closed in 1863 and also used as a hospital until the end of the War in 1865. When the church regained possession of its buildings in May 1865, they had suffered extensive damage. One month later, on June 23, 1865, the vestry submitted to the Federal occupation force a statement of charges for repairs to restore the church to its former condition. The church was not reimbursed until 1912 for these expenses.

== Bicentennial observances ==
In honor of the church's 200th anniversary, St. Paul's has commissioned bicentennial service music composed by William Bradley Roberts, a series of lectures by eminent scholars on various historical subjects relating to worship in the church and its architecture, as well as other celebrations. All of these events culminated in a visit from the Presiding Bishop of the Episcopal Church USA, the Most Reverend Katharine Jefferts Schori. In June 2009, the St. Paul's Choir went on a pilgrimage to England where it performed in St. Paul's Cathedral, Canterbury Cathedral, St. James's Church, Piccadilly, and other venues.

== St. Paul's and controversy in the Episcopal Church ==
=== 19th-century liturgical controversy ===
St. Paul's' owes its inception at least in part to the liturgical controversy over vestments and liturgical details that roiled the Episcopal Church during much of the Nineteenth Century. One of the offenses committed by the first rector of St. Paul's, William Lewis Gibson, before his abrupt resignation as rector of Christ Church and the resulting split in that congregation leading to the establishment of St. Paul's was that he chose to wear a white surplice over his cassock during services.

By 1873, the controversy over vestments and ritual accoutrements had become so acute that the Diocese of Kentucky seceded from the Episcopal Church. It is said that if Bishop Francis M. Whittle, Bishop of the Virginia Diocese, and well known in the Church for his opposition to "decorations" of any kind, had joined the schism, the Episcopal Church would have divided then as it had not in the Civil War.

While services at St. Paul's now reflect the Broad Church consensus, services throughout the 19th century were notably less austere than at Christ Church. By the 1880s, the decorations on the St. Paul's altar were a stark contrast to Christ Church that attracted comment. The divergent liturgical practices within the Diocese of Virginia and the intensity of feelings engendered by that controversy in its time are now recognized by some as precedent for dealing with current rifts in a tolerant and civil manner without schism.

=== Civil War ===
The Civil War did not produce a formal division of the Episcopal Church, only a substitution of prayers for those in authority. Services in the Confederate States included prayers for the Confederate authorities rather than for the President of the United States. The services otherwise remained the same. In the North, the General Convention of 1862 declined to adopt resolutions that would have denounced the Southern Churchmen as seditious and schismatical.

Reconciliation within the Episcopal Church after the Civil War concluded was strained by the suffering and losses of life on both sides during that conflict, but helped to heal by mutual expressions of good will. Within a year of the end of the conflict the dioceses in the South had resolved to resume relations with the dioceses in the Union states. A resolution in the Diocese of Virginia to resume relations with the national church was adopted overwhelmingly by both clergy and laity at a meeting of the diocese on May 16, 1866. The meeting that adopted the resolution convened at St. Paul's.

=== Current rifts and controversies in the Anglican Communion ===
Two members of St. Paul's congregation, David Abshire, and The Very Rev. Ian Markham, priest associate and Dean, Virginia Theological Seminary, wrote in 2008 regarding the rifts in the Episcopal Church (United States) and the Anglican Communion arising from controversies in the previous few years. In urging a respect for civility, "respect, listening, dialogue, and the possibility of higher ground," Abshire and Markham suggest that civility does not mean giving up what are considered sacred values, but means "searching for transcendent values with which to advance the common good."

With regard to an alleged abandonment of the final authority of scripture, sola scriptura, Abshire and Markham contend that the final authority of scripture in matters of faith and practice as historically understood in the Roman Catholic Church, in Anglicanism, and by Luther during the Reformation never meant literalism, but attention to the spiritual content of scripture. The literalism of fundamentalist Christianity, as articulated by American Baptists in the early Twentieth Century, is out of place, they contend, in the Anglican tradition, "which embraces both faith and reason and a sense of proportion." Anglicanism, they maintain, favors civility in dealing with differences.

== Architecture ==
=== Latrobe's design ===
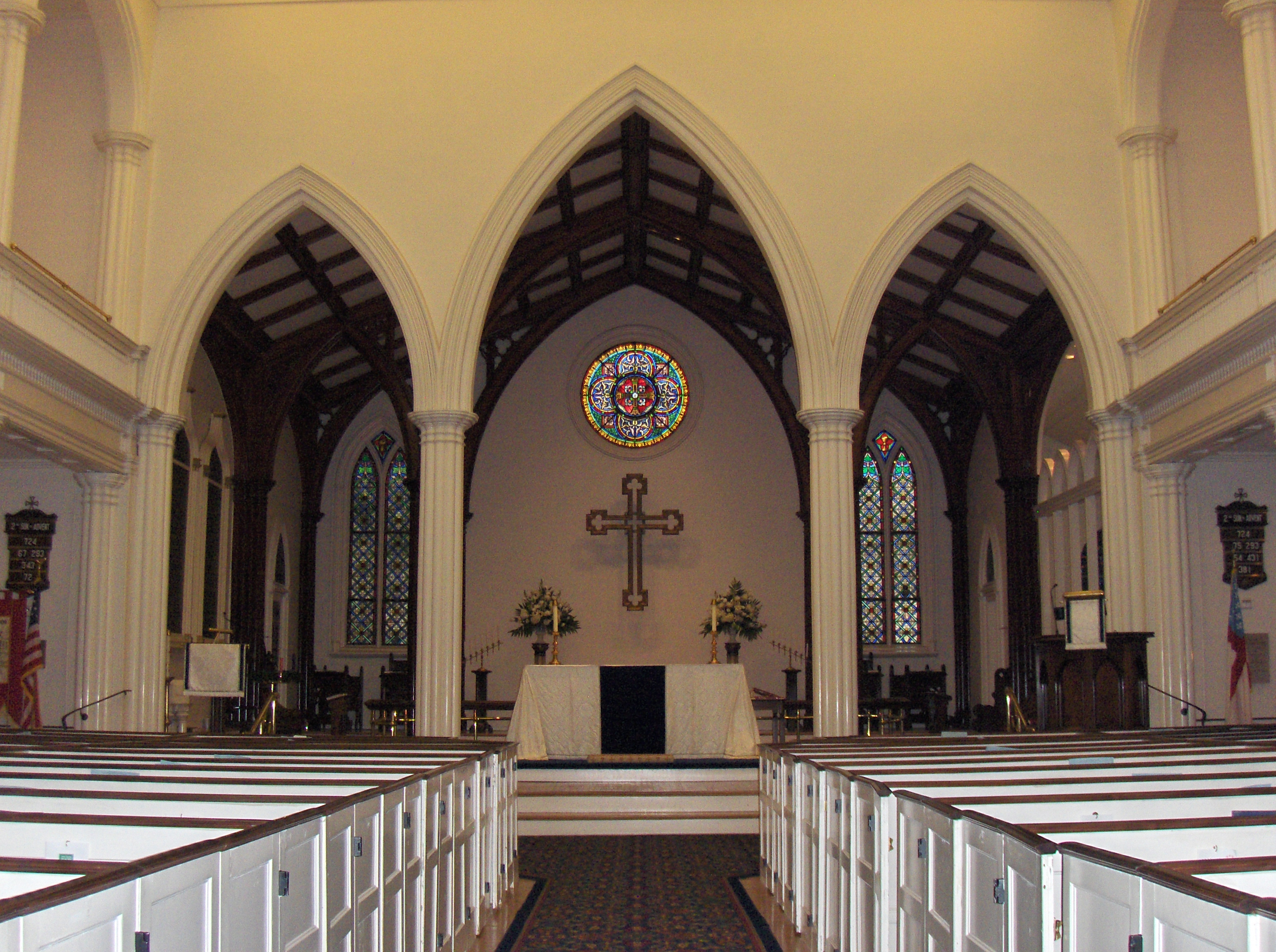
St. Paul's Church Interior, 2008

The design of St. Paul's reflects a close collaboration between Latrobe as architect and William Holland Wilmer (1782–1827), the second rector of St. Paul's, from February 1812 until October 19, 1826. During his term as rector of St. Paul's, Wilmer also founded St. John's Episcopal Church, Lafayette Square, Washington, D.C. and served between 1815 and 1817 as rector of that church also. It was during his term as rector of St. John's that Latrobe designed and supervised the construction of that church in a classical style. Bushrod Washington, nephew of George Washington, Supreme Court Justice, and an active layman in the St. Paul's congregation may, as a friend of Latrobe, also have had a role in Latrobe's retention as architect by the St. Paul's vestry.

Though mainly known for buildings executed in a neoclassical style, including the United States Capitol, the Baltimore Cathedral, and St. John's Episcopal Church, Latrobe had developed a Gothic plan for the Baltimore cathedral as an alternative to the Greco-Roman plan that was selected by Bishop Carroll.

Latrobe's design for the St. Paul's façade derives from that rejected Gothic plan. The three equal arches in the St. Paul's façade that rise the full height of the building below the gable create a shallow porch, through which the church is entered. Though clearly differing in scale and ornamental elaboration, the façade is said to be reminiscent of Peterborough Cathedral. Wilmer favored the Gothic style. Unlike a classical building, a church in Gothic style would recall the fervor of the medieval English Church and would be free of "Popish" and pagan connotations.

Latrobe conceived of the interior of the church as a preaching place like the Congregational meeting houses of New England. The preaching space was to be open, unencumbered by piers and columns, with a central pulpit centered on the east wall with only an alcove behind for a chancel. As conceived by Latrobe, the interior of St. Paul's would afford all in the congregation an unobstructed view of a raised central pulpit in front of the altar.

This pure conception was subverted during construction of St. Paul's. At the instigation of the vestry and over Latrobe's strident objections, the builder constructed galleries on the north, south and west sides of the church. Latrobe, however, was correct that members of the congregation in the galleries would be unable to see the pulpit. In 1872, the galleries were modified by raising the pews as if on steps specifically to address that limitation.

With the galleries, St. Paul's is said to be similar to St. James Church, Piccadilly in its overall scheme and scale although simpler and different in architectural style from the Baroque architecture of that church.

=== Later modifications ===
Over the course of the 19th century, the simplified liturgy with an emphasis on preaching that was prevalent in Virginia when St. Paul's was built gave way in the Episcopal Church and in St. Paul's to a greater emphasis on ritual. By the late 1800s, the high pulpit in front of the altar had been replaced by a pulpit set to the side, and in 1906 the chancel alcove in the Latrobe design was recessed 40 feet.

As a result of further change in liturgical emphasis to give the Eucharist a more central role in worship, the altar was moved in 1968 from the rear of the recessed chancel to its center. At that time, the organ in the chancel was replaced. A new organ constructed by Casavant Frères was installed in the West gallery.

Throughout, the church façade has experienced only periodic repairs and has remained true to Latrobe's design.

== Organ ==
Casavant Frères Ltée. (Opus 2972, 1968)

Technical Details: Chests: Electro-pneumatic (EP) 41 ranks. 1,972 pipes. 3 divisions. 2 manuals. 32 stops. 32 registers.

Stoplists

GREAT

16' Quintaden     
8' Prinzipal         
8' Bordun              
8' Gemshorn             
4' Oktav                
4' Rohrflöte            
2' Oktav            
2' Blockflöte          
II  Sesquialtera       
IV  Mixtur              
8' Trompete             

SWELL

8' Gedackt          
8' Salizional      
8' Schwebung  
4' Prinzipal       
4' Waldflöte      
2' Oktav       
1 1/3' Quintflöte     
IV  Scharf      
16' Dulzian      
8' Oboe           
Tremulant

PEDAL

32' Bourdon (digital)
16' Prinzipal     
16' Subbass      
8' Oktav        
8' Gedacktflöte 
4' Choralbass   
4' Rohrpfeife   
2' Nachthorn    
III  Mixtur       
16' Posaune  
8' Trompete  
4' Schalmei

== Cemetery ==
The church's cemetery is located about a half-mile away, adjacent to other cemeteries. It was established in 1809. Notable interments are:

- Female Stranger – Site in Alexandra, Virginia, US
- Wilmer McLean – American businessman involved in the American Civil War (1814-1882)
- Abraham Myers – United States and Confederate States Army officer (1811–1889)

== See also ==
- National Register of Historic Places listings in Alexandria, Virginia
