= National Presbyterian Church =

The National Presbyterian Church
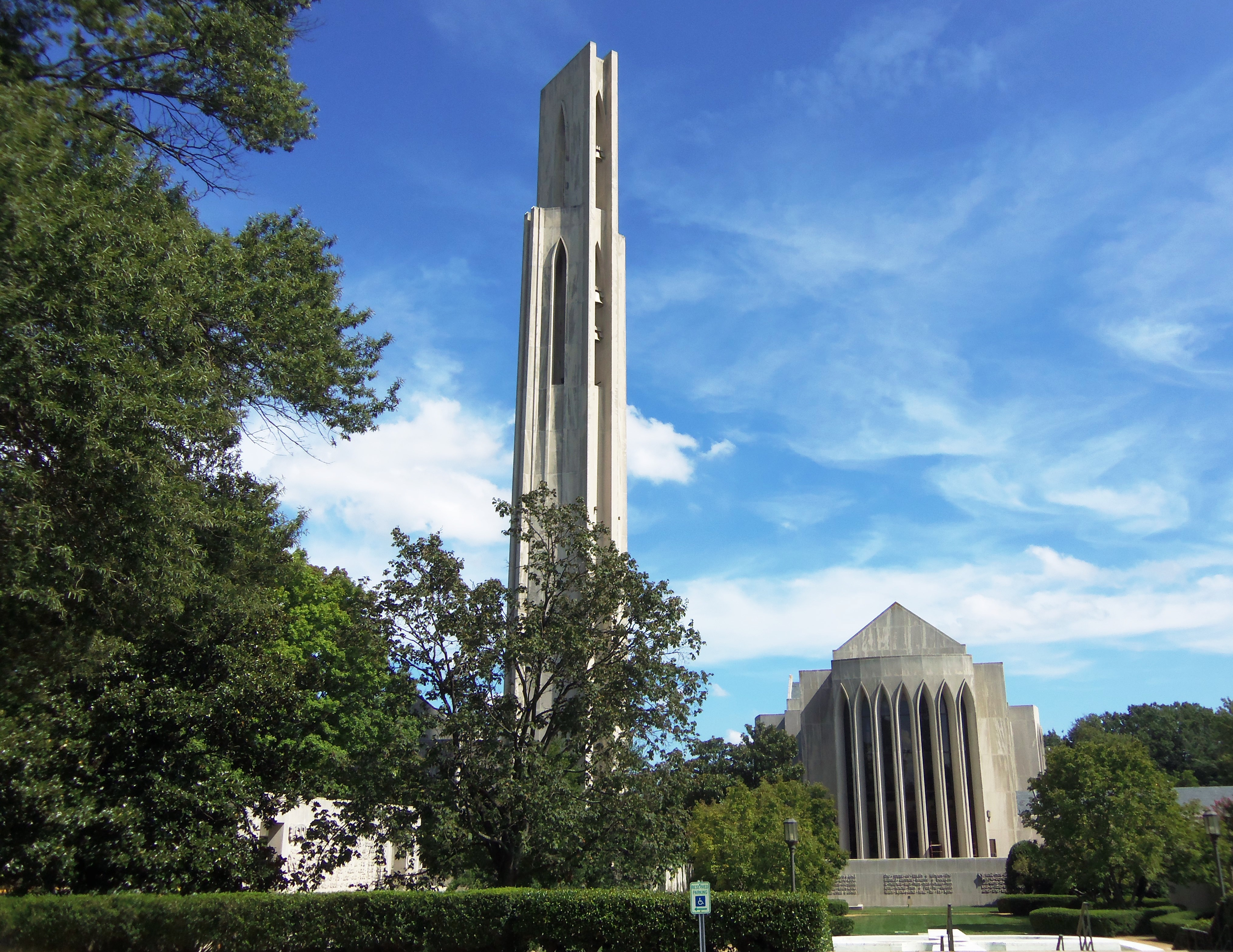
- Exterior view of the church from Nebraska Avenue (2012)

- Location within District of Columbia Location within the United States
- 38°56′30″N 77°04′51″W
- Location: 4101 Nebraska Ave NW; Washington, D.C.
- Country: United States
- Denomination: Presbyterian Church (USA)
- Previous denomination: United Presbyterian Church in the United States of America; Presbyterian Church in the United States of America
- Website: www.nationalpres.org

History
- Status: Active
- Founded: September 15, 1812
- Dedicated: September 7, 1969

Architecture
- Functional status: National church
- Architect: Harold E. Wagoner
- Architectural type: Church
- Style: Modernist

Clergy
- Pastor: The Rev. Dr. Ray Hylton

The National Presbyterian Church is a Christian congregation of approximately 1,500 members of all ages from the greater metropolitan Washington, D.C., area. The mission statement of the church is "Leading People to Become Faithful Followers of Jesus Christ Together in God's World"

The congregation meets at 4101 Nebraska Avenue NW, Washington, D.C. Designated as the national church of the Presbyterian Church (U.S.A.), the building complex occupies a 12-acre campus comprising six separate structures. It includes a mid century modern style main church which is the third largest religious center in the nation's capital. President Dwight D. Eisenhower laid the cornerstone on October 14, 1967. The campus was listed on the National Register of Historic Places in 2022.

The site also includes the National Presbyterian School, which provides pre-school-to-Grade 6 education. The school is accredited by the Middle States Association of Colleges and Schools and the Association of Independent Maryland and DC Schools and is open to all children.

The National Presbyterian Church dates its origins to 1795, when a group of Scottish stonemasons working on the construction of the White House met for worship. Since then, the congregation has been housed in several buildings across the city. Numerous presidents as well as other national and international leaders have attended the church. In 1866, the pastor invited Frederick Douglass, noted black abolitionist, to speak from the church's pulpit when no other church in Washington other than New York Avenue Presbyterian Church would do so. The church has hosted the British royal family, Mother Teresa and many other notable leaders.

== The church today ==
The National Presbyterian Church conducts several weekly worship services as well as many other teachings, caring and music services for the community.

These services include biblical preaching, a full choir, hymns traditional and modern, and organ music of all periods. On special occasions, the musical offerings are augmented by members of local or visiting orchestral and choral groups, including members of the National Symphony Orchestra. Communion is served on the first Sunday of each month and is open to all persons within the Christian faith. Live video of the worship service is available online.

=== Teaching ministries ===
Adult Christian education classes are held on Sunday mornings, and small group studies occur throughout the week. Sessions include Bible classes, as well as classes dealing with current issues and personal growth. Lectures, conferences, and seminars are frequently hosted, including meetings of the National Capital Presbytery and the Reformed Institute. The Children's Sunday School includes preschool, elementary and youth group classes. Child care is also provided.

The church also houses archives of historical documents, and contains a library with a full range of theological and historical books.

=== Caring ministries ===
The congregation and staff support numerous caring ministries, both in the local area and at many locations around the globe. They include:

- Local/regional outreach: food and hunger relief (Martha's Table and Central Union Mission), housing (Habitat for Humanity), youth services (Unique Learning Center), and social services (Community Council for the Homeless at Friendship Place)
- International missions
- Care, connection and support to congregants through a variety of ministries from Deacons and Stephen Ministers to hospital visits and prayer opportunities. Referrals are made to partner ministries such as GriefShare and DivorceCare as well as to professional counselors.

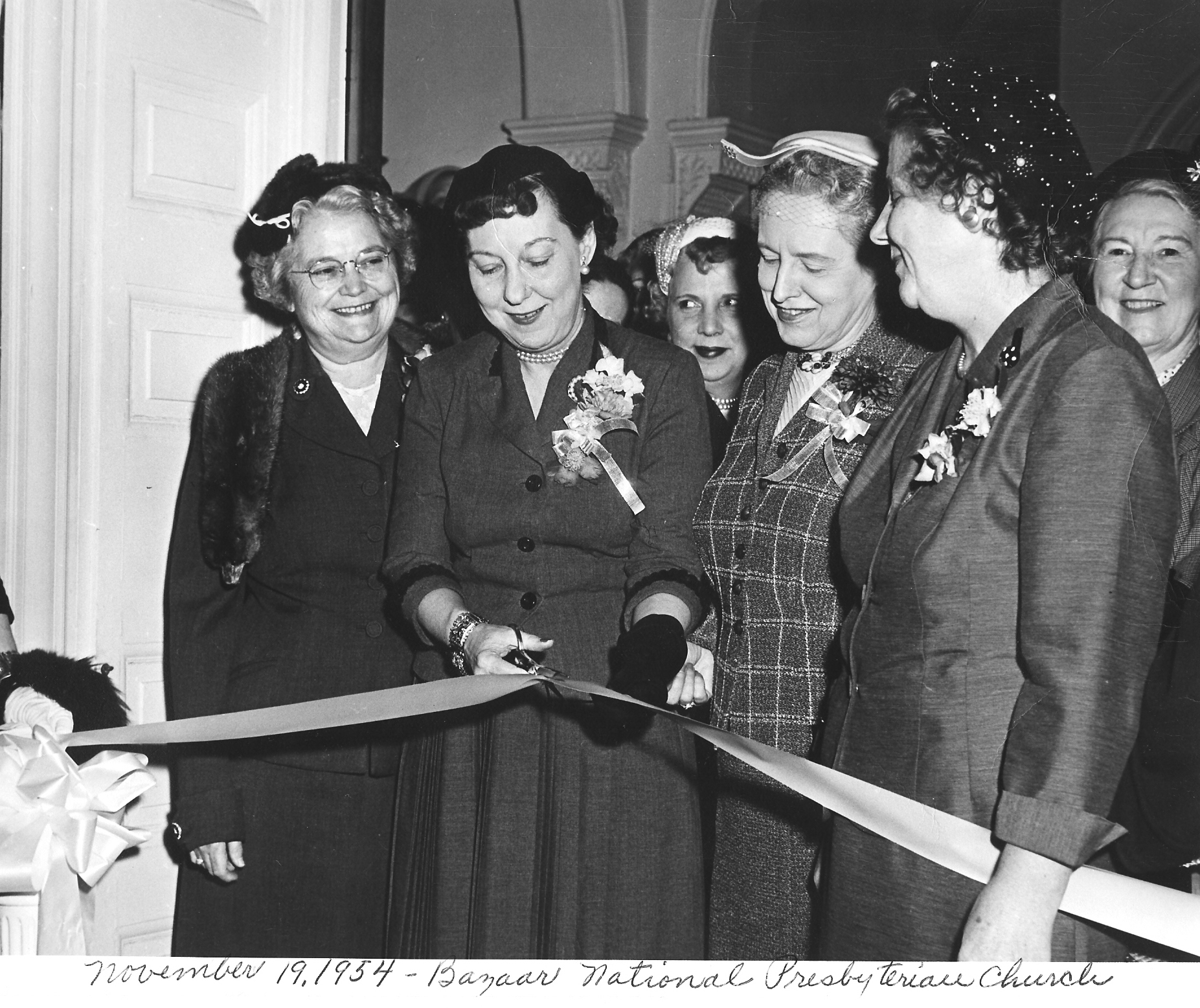
First Lady Mamie Eisenhower opening Women's Bazaar at National Presbyterian Church

Other programs include small groups, men's ministry, women's ministry, older adult fellowship, children's and youth ministries and the Board of Deacons.

=== Music ministries ===
The 1,000-seat main sanctuary has one of the largest pipe organs in Washington, D.C. It accommodates a variety of musical styles in its worship and concerts.

The church's musical organizations include:

- Chancel Choir: leads worship singing at the traditional Sunday morning services and during special performances during the Christmas and Easter seasons or other times of the year. The choir includes both volunteers and professional artists.
- Festival Choir: performs larger choral works with orchestra and around 100 singers drawn equally from the congregation and the larger community.
- Contemporary Band: a keyboard based ensemble of singers and instruments such as guitar, bass, and drums leads the contemporary Sunday service.

=== Concert Series ===
The church is home to the “Music at National” concert series featuring major arts organizations for their subscription series and special events. Regulars include the Washington Bach Consort, the City Choir of Washington, Washington Master Chorale, the Washington Chorus, Choralis, the United States Army Chorus, the U. S. Navy Sea Chanters, and the Children's Chorus of Washington. College and university choruses or orchestras also perform during tours to the nation's capital.

=== Pipe organs ===
The sanctuary's John Jay Hopkins Memorial Organ, with 115 ranks and four manuals, is matched to the scale of the edifice. It was built by the Aeolian-Skinner Organ Company in 1968–1969 (Opus 1456). It is one of two Aeolian-Skinner organs in the church complex, the other being the 38-rank, 3-manual Allen Memorial Organ in the Chapel of the Presidents.

The main six divisions of the Hopkins Organ are located behind the choir at the front of the sanctuary with the pipework shielded from view behind a series of vertical screens. At the rear of the sanctuary, a 23-rank antiphonal division is located in the gallery balcony. It includes a brilliant state trumpet, which is mounted horizontally. The organ's inaugural concert was performed in April 1970 with Ernest Ligon at the manuals.

A new solo division of orchestral instrument “voices” was added to the Hopkins Organ in 2010. This enhanced the organ's versatility and size to over 6,500 pipes.

== Architecture ==
In January 1966, the congregation acquired the current property and began the design and construction of a new church complex. A building committee considered several designs, and selected the Modernist/Neo-Gothic design by ecclesiastical architect Harold E. Wagoner. The limestone and steel structure was constructed by the Charles H. Tompkins Co. of Washington, D.C.

=== Main sanctuary ===
The white marble and limestone sanctuary of The National Presbyterian Church seats 1,450 and has a traditional cathedral floor plan in the shape of a cross. The design of its 65-foot (20 m) ceiling gives the appearance of an inverted ship's bow, more specifically Noah's Ark, symbolizing its purpose as a place of refuge and safety. In accordance with Reformed Christian principles, the walls of the sanctuary were unadorned to focus attention on the preaching from the pulpit. The chancel area contains the liturgical cent with the pulpit, communion table and lectern which are the focus of the corporate worship. A raised tiered choir loft is behind the chancel with the screened organ chambers behind.

=== Faceted glass windows ===
The sanctuary is illuminated by 73 faceted stained glass windows designed by Willet Studios of Philadelphia. The windows comprise one of the largest collections of faceted glass in the United States. Described in detail in a book published in 2012, the windows range from the shorter windows lining the chancel sides that depict Bible stories to the two larger transept windows, each made of eight 31-foot (9.4 m) tall lancets. The north transept window contains abstract designs drawn from images in the book of Revelation. The text at the top reads "I know that my Redeemer liveth and at last will stand upon the earth" (Job 19:25).

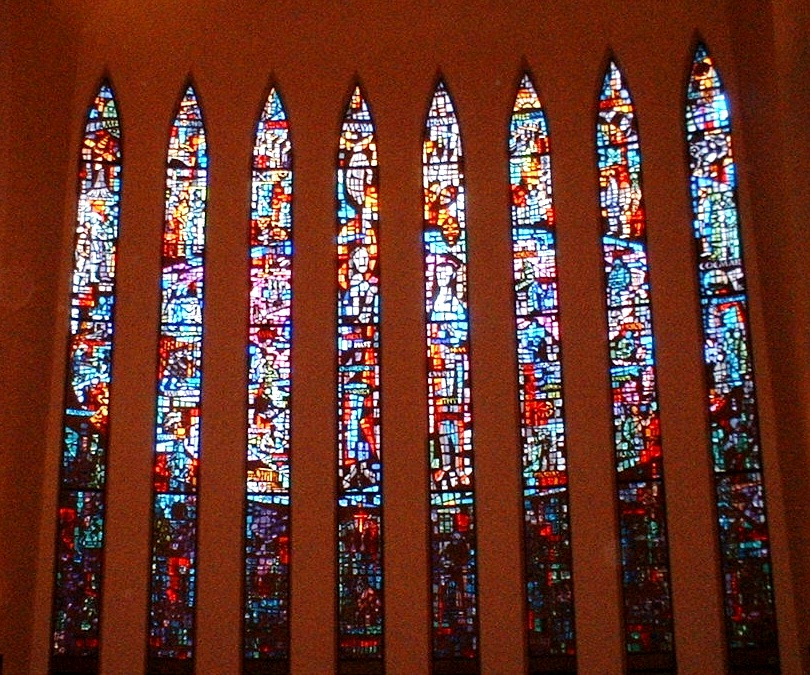
South transept stained-glass windows depicting the mission of the church, National Presbyterian Church in Washington, DC. The text at top reads "I came that they may have life and have it abundantly." (John 10:10)

The south transept window depicts the mission of the church, showing historical figures in science, art, politics, and ecclesiastical endeavors such as astronauts. The text at the top reads "I came that they may have life and have it abundantly." (John 10:10).

The designers of the main church building also incorporated space for the traditional 19th century Tiffany and Booth stained glass windows saved from the historic previous church. Other stained glass windows, new and antique, are visible around the campus.

=== Chapel of the Presidents ===
The Chapel of the Presidents, which seats 255, provides a more intimate setting. Another series of Willet Studios windows located in the Chapel of Presidents depicts, in the major window, the history of the struggle to maintain religious freedom in America. There are also six windows portraying specific Presidents (Washington, Lincoln, Theodore Roosevelt, Wilson, Franklin Delano Roosevelt, and Eisenhower, for whom the chapel is named and whose original prayer is printed on the outer wall).

=== Tower of Faith ===
The Tower of Faith is a 178 feet (54 m) structure that provides a landmark for the site. It contains a bell carillon consisting of 61 Flemish bell-tone generators in bronze struck by hammers, manufactured by the Schulmerich Carillon Company. In addition, there are 25 English bells, relocated from the tower of the Church of the Covenant. Both sets are playable from either organ console in the main sanctuary or the chapel.

The Tower of Faith sustained some minor damage during the 2011 Virginia earthquake, and required structural repairs.

=== Courtyard and other buildings ===
Six other buildings surround the main sanctuary structure. Originally part of the Hillcrest Children's Home, the Cotswold-style stone structures now house the National Presbyterian School, offices, and meeting spaces. The rear of the site includes a parking area, which is used during the work week by employees from adjacent sites including WRC (NBC4) TV. An acre immediately in front of the sanctuary building (facing Nebraska Avenue, NW) is landscaped and contains a marble Fountain Court and stone walls engraved with Biblical verses.

== History ==
=== Early years ===
The congregation that eventually became The National Presbyterian Church traces its heritage to the 18th century when Scottish stonemasons constructing the White House began holding Sunday morning worship services in a carpenters' shed on the White House grounds. By 1795, the group had grown large enough to form St. Andrew's Church and to install John Brackenridge as its minister. Church members met in private homes until 1800 when they occupied a frame structure at 10th and F Streets, NW. The small group persisted, meeting in several places between 1802 and 1811 including a school on East Capitol Street, a Masonic Lodge between 1st and 2nd Streets near the Washington Navy Yard, and even the Supreme Court of the United States chamber on the ground floor of the unfinished United States Capitol.

=== First Presbyterian Church ===
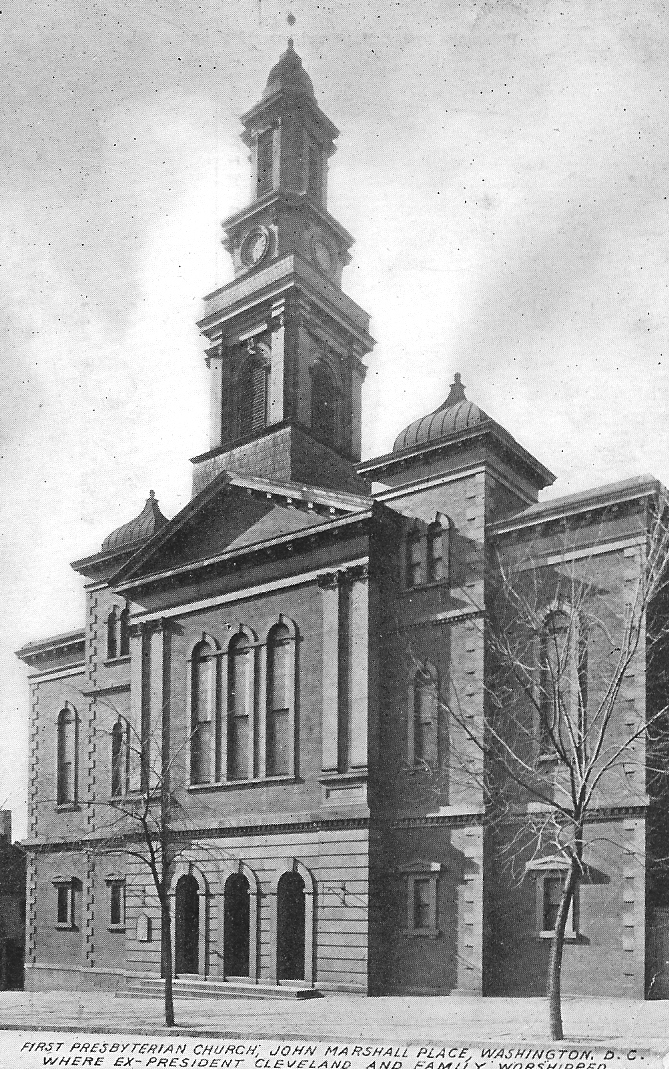
First Presbyterian Church (1812), 4½ Street, Washington DC

Members from the St. Andrew's group officially established First Presbyterian Church on September 15, 1812. With contributions from James Madison and James Monroe, among others, the congregation erected a frame structure. This “Little White Church under the Hill” was located on East Capitol Street on the south slope of Capitol Hill, where the Rayburn House Office Building now stands.

The first service in the new church was held on June 20, 1812. When the British burned and ransacked the Capitol in August 1814, the church was spared despite its proximity to the hostilities.

By 1821 the congregation numbered 114 members. Under the leadership of Ruben Post, First Presbyterian Church erected a substantial brick edifice on 4½ Street NW, which stood for over 100 years.

In 1853, Byron Sunderland began a distinguished 45-year tenure as senior pastor of the church. In 1857, Sunderland began to preach in favor of the abolition of slavery, a bold act in a city that was essentially a conservative Southern town. In 1866, Sunderland invited Frederick Douglass, noted black abolitionist, to speak from the church's pulpit when no other church in Washington would do so.

At this time the Presbyterian denomination split when Southern presbyteries seceded as a body (the Presbyterian Church in the United States). Although “Old First” was at the time a member of the Virginia Presbytery, one of the seceding groups, a vote of the church's congregation was split. As a result, the church was not attached to any presbytery for five years. In 1862, under a new presbytery it became part of the Philadelphia Synod.

Sunderland served as Chaplain of the United States Senate during the Civil War and again in the 1870s and was a friend and adviser to President Abraham Lincoln. Among the pastor's many contributions to the Presbyterian denomination and the Washington area was his role as a founder of what is today Gallaudet University. Presidents John Quincy Adams, Andrew Jackson, James K. Polk, Franklin Pierce, James Buchanan, Ulysses S. Grant, Grover Cleveland, and Benjamin Harrison worshiped at “Old First.” Sunderland performed the marriage ceremony of President Grover Cleveland and Frances Folsom at the White House. Orators of the day who spoke from the church's pulpit included Daniel Webster, Henry Clay, Henry Ward Beecher, and T. DeWitt Talmage, who later became pastor of First Presbyterian Church and then editor of the Christian Herald magazine.

In addition to Sunderland (who served as Senate Chaplain from 1861 to 1864), four other pastors of National Presbyterian Church congregations served as Senate Chaplains: John Brackenridge (1811–1814); John Clark (1818–1819); Reuben Post (1819–1820); and Edward L.R. Elson (1969–1981). (A total of 14 Senate Chaplains have been Presbyterians).

By the early 20th century, First Presbyterian's neighborhood had become largely commercial, and members were increasingly dispersed throughout the city. The Federal Government changed the name of 4½ Street to John Marshall Place and acquired the church site to erect court buildings. The congregation worshiped there for the last time on May 11, 1930, and then merged with the Covenant Presbyterian Church.

=== The Church of the Covenant (Presbyterian) ===
The urban growth that ultimately led to the destruction of the old First Church gave rise to many other Presbyterian congregations in the late 19th and early 20th centuries, including the Church of the Covenant. On March 11, 1883, eleven men, meeting in the home of Supreme Court Justice William Strong at 1141 H Street, N.W., formed the nucleus of The Church of the Covenant.

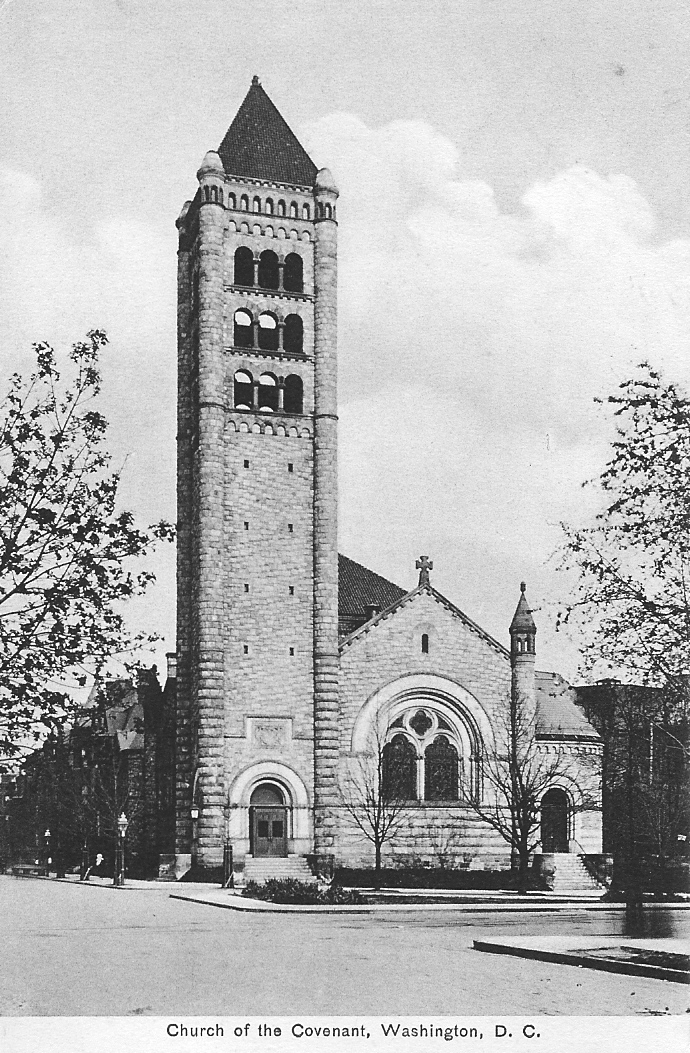
Church of the Covenant

Officially organized on October 13, 1885, with 53 charter members, this congregation acquired a strategic site at the intersection of N and 18th Streets and Connecticut Avenue NW, the heart of a fast-growing and affluent residential area. On June 28, 1887, the cornerstone of the greystone Romanesque Revival church was laid. The first service was held there on September 25, 1889. It was dedicated January 6, 1901, after the construction debt was paid. President Benjamin Harrison and inventor Alexander Graham Bell were among the new congregation's worshipers.

The Church of the Covenant flourished with strong lay leadership and a succession of pastors whose reputations extended throughout the denomination and the nation. Teunis S. Hamlin, a strong preacher, helped secure a site for the George Washington University. He also served as President of the Board of Trustees of Howard University for many years.

Members of Covenant Church were active on many fronts. In 1885, its women founded the Society of the Covenant, which became the Women's Association. One of Covenant's early missions (in 1908) was to establish a tuberculosis clinic in Beirut, Lebanon. In the early 1900s, the congregation established in Georgetown the Peck Memorial Chapel, which provided, in addition to Sunday services, a vocational education program for minorities and disadvantaged youth.

Under Charles Wood, pastor from 1908 to 1928, Covenant's membership grew to 1,800. Wood, an outstanding preacher, organized and became the first president of the Washington Federation of Churches.

It was with this ample Covenant congregation that First Presbyterian Church merged. That it chose Covenant rather than another Presbyterian congregation in Washington was due in large measure to the movement for a national Presbyterian church in the nation's capital. Throughout the 19th century, the General Assembly received numerous proposals for a national church and in 1923 established a commission to explore formally and officially create such a church in Washington. In 1930, the Church of the Covenant was selected to “furnish the congregational nucleus about which this National Church should be organized.” It was considered appropriate that the congregation of the now-demolished First Presbyterian church, with so rich a history, should move across the city and merge with Covenant in June 1930.

=== Covenant-First Presbyterian Church ===
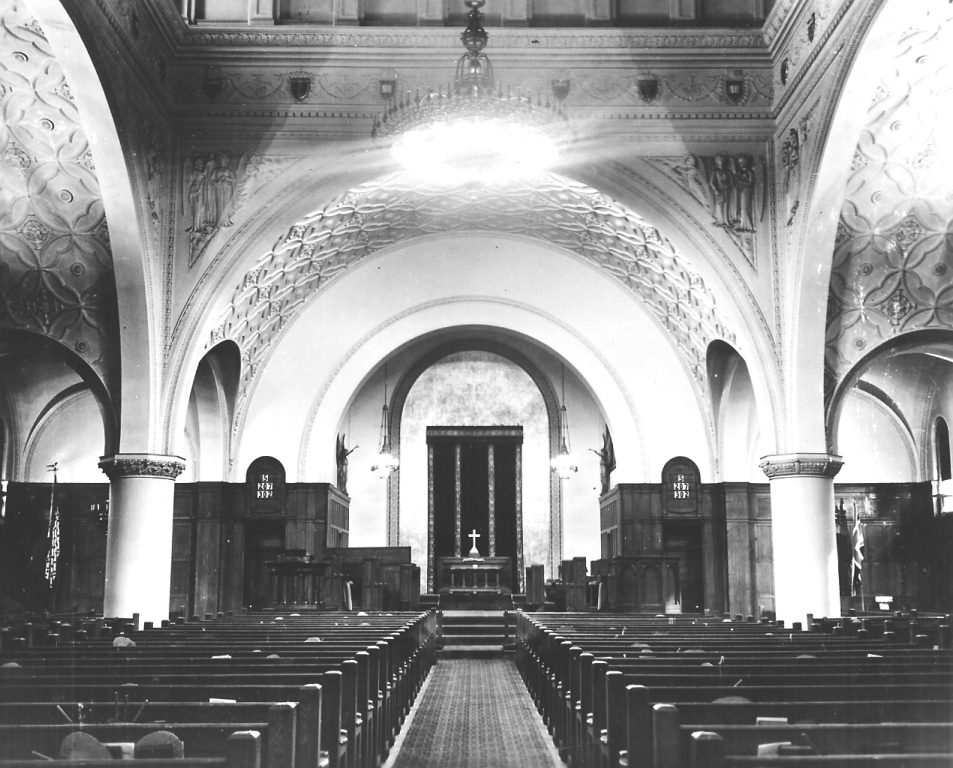
Sanctuary of combined Covenant-First Presbyterian Church 1930-1967

The pastor of the combined Covenant-First Presbyterian congregation from 1930 to 1946 was Albert Joseph McCartney. McCarthy advocated a great national church. His efforts were rewarded when the General Assembly took official steps to designate Covenant-First as “The National Presbyterian Church.” The designation became effective at services held on October 19, 1947, when President Harry S. Truman unveiled a bronze tablet bearing the church's new name. Today, that bronze tablet is displayed outside the Chapel of the Presidents.

=== The National Presbyterian Church ===
Edward L. R. Elson, who succeeded McCarthy in 1946, worked to inspire the denomination to the potential for Christian witness and service by a national church. On October 15, 1947, clergy throughout the denomination and the city of Washington converged at the Covenant-First Presbyterian Church for a dedicatory service to establish that church as The National Church of the Presbyterian denomination. For the new national church of the denomination, the General Assembly, in conjunction with church leaders, was eager to expand the facilities to support a wider array of religious, educational, and cultural activities. His parishioner, President Dwight D. Eisenhower, whom Elson baptized in 1953, supported him in meetings with denomination leaders.

The obsolescence of the existing church building, along with the lack of space to expand, were among the determining factors for selecting a new location. In January 1966 the congregation acquired its current property and began the design and construction of a new church complex. For three years during construction, the congregation worshipped in the Capital Memorial Seventh Day Adventist Church. The cornerstone of the new church was laid by President Eisenhower on October 14, 1967, and the congregation first worshipped in its new home on September 7, 1969.

The year 1969 also marked the opening of the National Presbyterian School, a private school that now serves preschool through sixth-grade students. The school is open to children of all faiths in the Washington area.

Edward L. R. Elson, who had overseen the conception, design, and construction of the new church, retired in 1973 to devote full-time to his duties as Chaplain of the United States Senate, a position to which he had been elected in 1969.

== Notable milestones ==
Over the span of more than two centuries, The National Presbyterian Church or its antecedents have sponsored, hosted, or participated in a long list of events of historic interest. The church's library and archives contain books, manuscripts, and photographs documenting occasions such as the following:

1. Anti-slavery speeches by Frederick Douglass – During the pastorate of Byron Sunderland, Senior Minister at The First Presbyterian Church, the abolitionist Frederick Douglass was looking for a site within the city of Washington to give some speeches regarding the abolitionist movement. When Sunderland heard of the difficulty Douglass had in securing another location for his speech, he asked the Session if the church might host the famous orator. The Session was divided; some members of the Session resigned and a number of parishioners even left the church. However Sunderland prevailed, saying that it was better to err on the side of justice and Christian values. Douglass gave his presentations.

2. First religious radio station – On December 22, 1921, the federal government issued a broadcast station license with the call letters WDM to then-Church of the Covenant. This was the first radio station operated by a religious institution. The station debuted on January 1, 1922, broadcasting the Sunday morning worship services. WDM remained licensed until the spring of 1925. Its transmitter is now in the collection of the Smithsonian Institution.

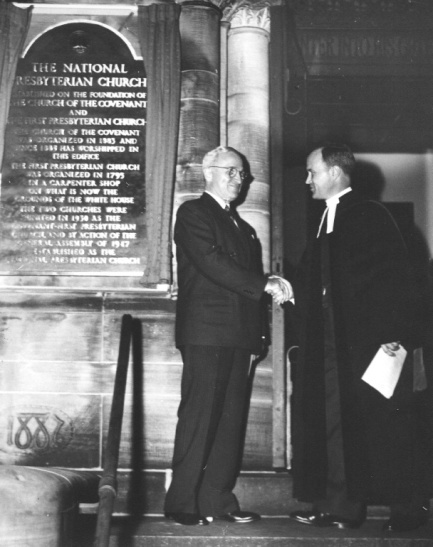
U.S. President Harry S. Truman with Edward Elson unveiling plaque establishing the National Church of the Presbyterian denomination in 1947

3. Attendance of President Harry S. Truman at the consecration of The National Presbyterian Church – On October 15, 1947, clergy throughout the denomination and the city of Washington converged at the Covenant-First Presbyterian Church for a dedicatory service to establish that church as The National Church of the Presbyterian denomination. Senior Minister Edward L. R. Elson unveiled the plaque to the president of the United States, Harry S. Truman.

4. Baptism of President Eisenhower – When he became president, Dwight D. Eisenhower expressed an interest in joining The National Presbyterian Church. On February 1, 1953, Elson baptized the new president. After the baptism, the President and Mrs. Eisenhower occupied a pew that would become habitual for them for the next eight years.

5. Performance by Duke Ellington and his Orchestra – A number of special programs and activities were organized to celebrate the opening and the move to the new church site in 1970. One of these programs was a concert of sacred music composed and performed by jazz maestro Duke Ellington and his orchestra.

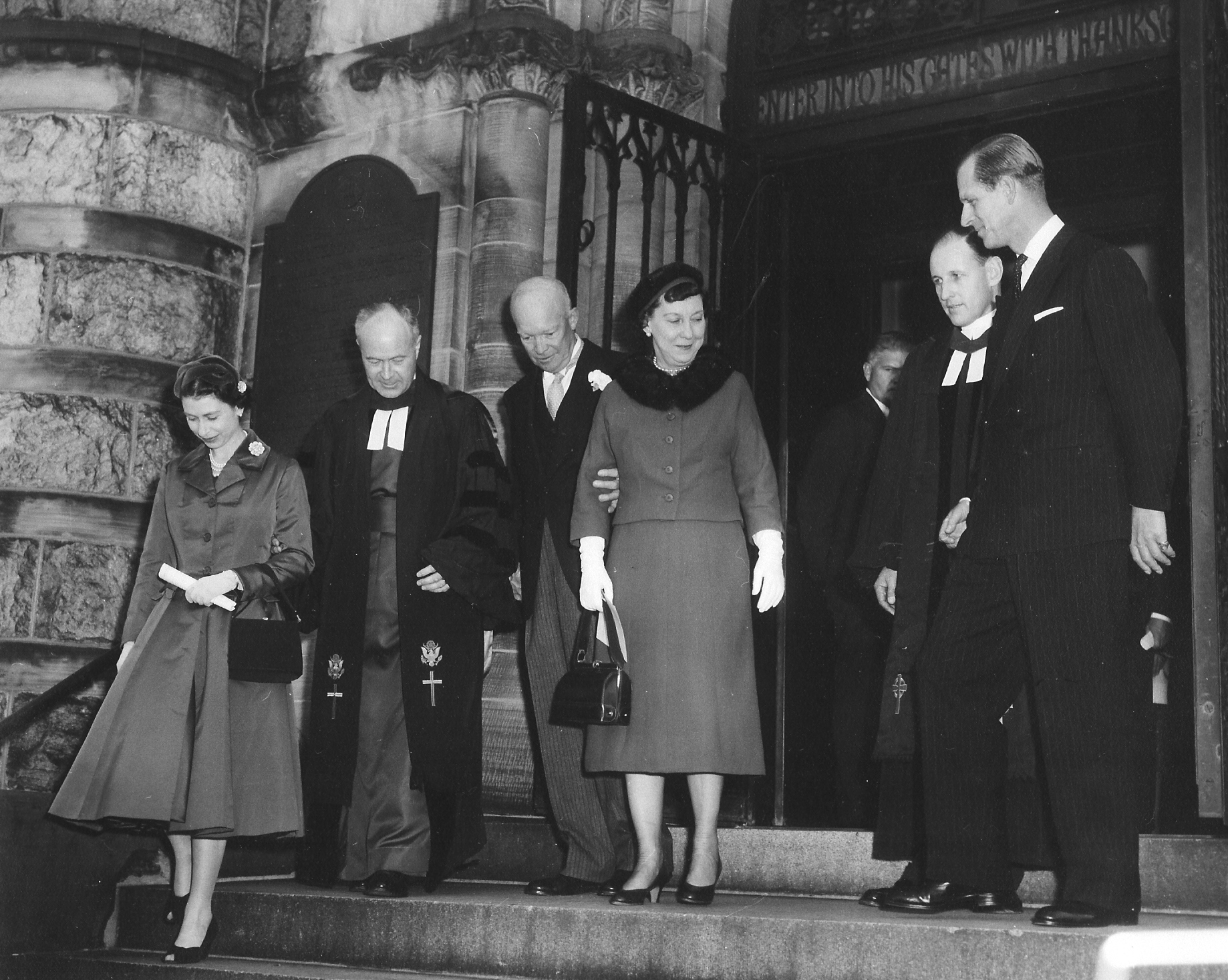
1957 Royal Visit: L to R: Queen Elizabeth II, Senior Pastor Elson, President Eisenhower, Mamie Eisenhower, Associate Minister John Edwards and Prince Philip

6. Visit by Queen Elizabeth II – In 1957, President Eisenhower invited Queen Elizabeth II and Prince Philip of the United Kingdom, who were in the United States for a state visit, to join him and Mrs. Eisenhower for a worship service at The National Presbyterian Church.

7. Presentation by Mother Teresa of Calcutta – In 1983, U.S. Senator Mark Hatfield, informed the church of Mother Teresa's upcoming visit to the United States. Mother Teresa to spoke at a scheduled Forum on women in the church.

8. Visit by the President of South Africa – During a state visit to the United States, the President of South Africa, Mr. F. W. de Klerk, attended worship services at The National Presbyterian Church with the United States Ambassador to the Netherlands. Following the service, the President and his party were invited to meet the Session of the church and provide remarks on the status of apartheid in South Africa, which he later helped bring to an end.

9. Participation of national leaders in television programs – The National Presbyterian Center invited a number of national leaders to participate in discussion programs on world events, which were broadcast on the church's television program "Religion and the World". Participants included Martin Luther King Jr. and Norman Vincent Peale.

10. Interview with former hostage and Presbyterian minister, Benjamin Weir – Shortly after his release by Shiite militants in Lebanon in 1985, Benjamin Weir, who became Moderator of the General Assembly of the Presbyterian Church (U.S.A.), was interviewed on national television to explain his captivity and subsequent release. As the national church for the denomination, the church was selected as the appropriate venue for this event.

== Leadership ==
=== Governance ===
The headquarters of the Presbyterian Church (USA) are located in Louisville, Kentucky. As a member of this body, The National Presbyterian Church is governed according to the polity of the denomination. Responsibility for governance rests with an elected group of Ruling Elders (presbyters) of the church called the Session. Pastors or ministers are elected by the Session; they are called Teaching Elders. Regional groups of churches are gathered into Presbyteries, and overall policy is decided by a representative gathering in even years, the General Assembly.

=== Current clergy ===
Led by the Senior Minister and supported by professional staff and volunteers, the program ministries of The National Presbyterian Church are performed by ordained clergy:

- Ray Hylton Sr., Senior Pastor
- Lisa Larsen, Associate Pastor of Care Ministries
- Craig Meek, Associate Pastor for Adult Discipleship
- Kristin Franke, Associate Pastor for Next Generation Formation

== Theology ==
As a “creedal” and “Reformed” church within the Presbyterian Church (USA) denomination, The National Presbyterian Church accepts and confirms the eleven documents that comprise its Book of Confessions, beginning with the Nicene Creed and Apostles' Creed, and moving to the Barmen Declaration and the Confession of 1967. In accordance with these confessions, the church's members, clergy, and officers of The National Presbyterian Church adopted the following statement of faith:

We are forgiven, redeemed and made whole by Jesus Christ. God is the Creator who made the universe and made us. We know and worship God as our heavenly Father, through relationship with his Son by the power of the Holy Spirit. Jesus Christ is our Lord and the world's only Savior. Through his life, death and resurrection, God offers us forgiveness and the opportunity to renew our relationship with God now and forever. Scripture is more than a set of guidelines or ideals. It is the Word of God, and our authority in faith and life. It tells us how human beings are to be in relationship with God and how our relationships with God and others become broken. It proclaims who Jesus Christ is and how he saves us. All Jesus-followers are called to live out their faith within his Church.

== The library and archives ==
In 1947, when The National Presbyterian Church was consecrated, one of the stipulations of the denominational designation was the establishment and maintenance of a library and archives. In 2012 the William Smith Culbertson Memorial Library was designated by the national Church and Synagogue Library Association as the Outstanding Congregational Library of the United States. With a collection of over 18,000 items, the library is one of the largest religious church libraries on the eastern seaboard of the nation. The Chapman Memorial Archives is a collection of over 450,000 documents and records of the church, its three predecessor congregations, as well as a repository of minutes of the General Assembly of the Presbyterian Church (USA) denomination.

Many of the library's resources are available online through the church web site.

== See also ==
Earl F. Palmer, minister from 2008 to 2010
