= John Price Durbin =

American priest

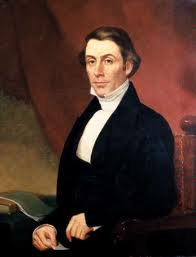
- Born: October 10, 1800; Paris, Kentucky, U.S.
- Died: October 18, 1876 (aged 76); New York, New York, U.S.
- Resting place: Laurel Hill Cemetery, Philadelphia, Pennsylvania, U.S.
- Occupations: Chaplain of the Senate, president of Dickinson College

John Price Durbin (October 10, 1800 - October 18, 1876) was an American Methodist clergyman and educator who served as Chaplain of the United States Senate from 1831 to 1832 and president of Dickinson College from 1833 to 1844.

== Early life ==
Durbin was born on October 10, 1800, in Paris, Kentucky, to Elizabeth "Betsy" Nunn and Hozier Durbin; he was the oldest of their five sons. While he was still young, his father died and he went to work for a cabinetmaker. He continued in this trade until his religious conversion at age 18. Durbin studied Latin, Greek and English grammar with tutors.

== Career ==
Licensed to preach by the Methodist church, Durbin went to Ohio in 1819 in order to begin his ministry. His first church was in Hamilton, Ohio (1821); he entered classes at Miami University while serving there. After another relocation, Durbin continued his college education at Cincinnati College, from which he earned a bachelor's degree and a Master of Arts degree (1825). He was appointed professor of languages at Augusta College in Kentucky.

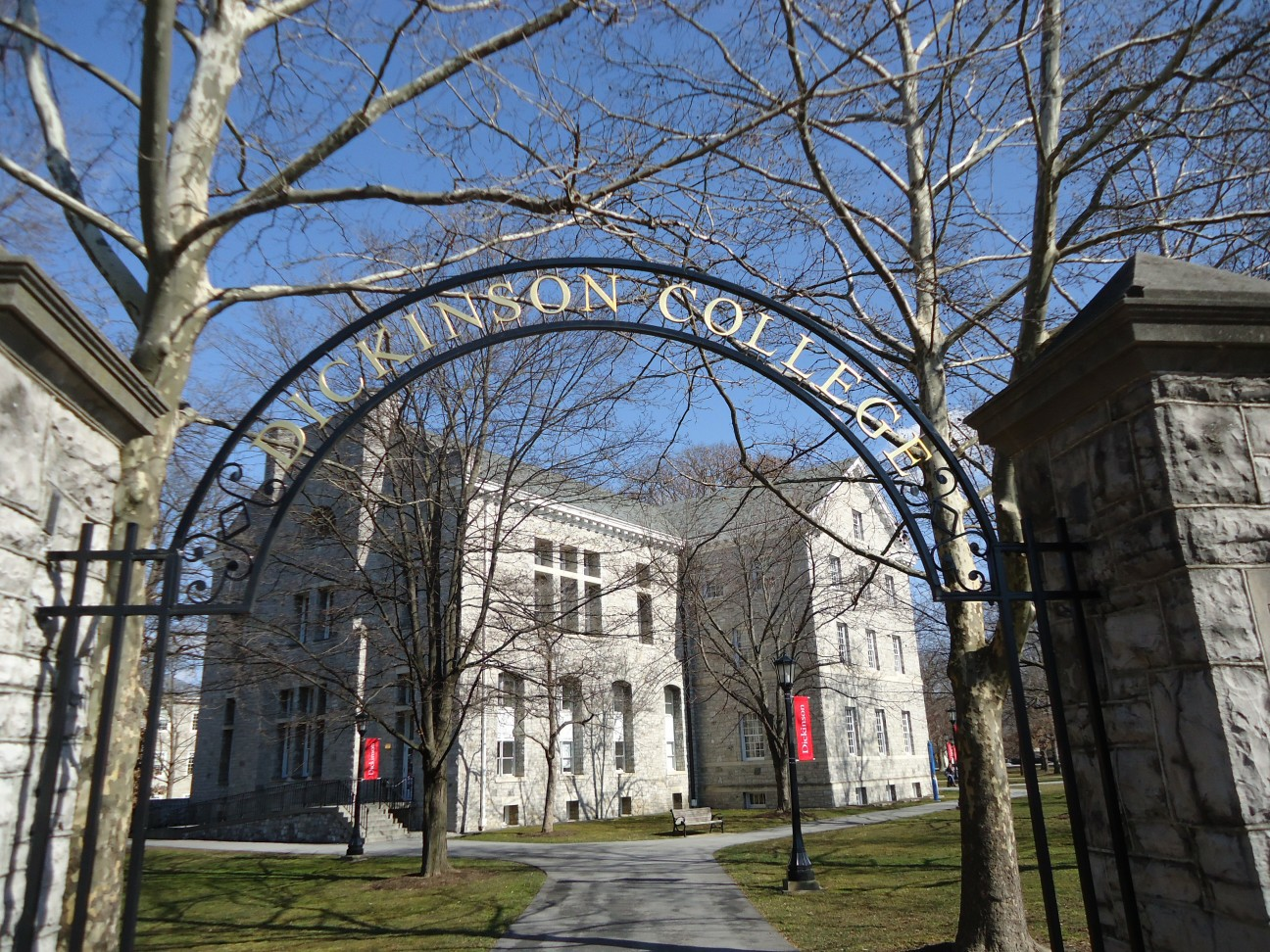
Durbin served as president of Dickinson College in Carlisle, Pennsylvania, from 1833 to 1844.

In 1829, while teaching at Augusta College, his colleagues nominated him as Chaplain of the Senate. His nomination ended in a tie in the Senate, and Vice President John C. Calhoun voted for another chaplain who was from the church his mother attended. Durbin was reconsidered as Chaplain of the Senate in 1831 and this time won the vote. He had not solicited the position and had been offered a position as professor of natural science at Wesleyan University in Middletown, Connecticut, but declined it so as to accept the position of Chaplain of the Senate. Thereafter, he was editor of the Christian Advocate (1832). In 1833, Dickinson College became part of the Baltimore Conference of the Methodist Church; Durbin was called to be the new president, serving until 1844.

Following retirement from the college, Durbin served Union Methodist Church in Philadelphia. In 1850 he became secretary of the Missionary Society, serving until 1872, when ill health led to his retirement. His several tours of Europe and the Middle East led to well-received books which he authored.

Durbin died in New York City on October 18, 1876. He was interred in Laurel Hill Cemetery, Philadelphia.

== Personal life ==
Durbin married Frances Budd Cook of Philadelphia on September 6, 1827, in Pennsylvania. His children with Frances Cook were Lucretia, Augusta, Margaret, Alexander Cook, John Price and William. Following Frances' death he married her sister Margaret Cook in 1839.

== Bibliography ==
- Observations in Europe, Principally in France and Great Britain, Harper & Brothers, New York, 1844
- Observations in the East: Chiefly in Egypt, Palestine, Syria, and Asia Minor, Harper & Brothers, New York, 1845

== Sources ==
- Curry, Daniel (1887). The Methodist Review. (Bimonthly.) Volume LXIX. - Fifth Series, Volume III. Phillips & Hunt.
- Morgan, James Henry (1933). Dickinson College: The History of One Hundred Fifty Years 1783-1933. Dickinson College.
- Roche, John A. (1893). The Life of John Price Durbin, D.D., LL.D., With an Analysis of His Homiletic Skill and Sacred Oratory. Hunt & Eaton.

Religious titles
Preceded by Henry Van Dyke Johns	27th US Senate Chaplain; December 19, 1831 – December 11, 1832	Succeeded by Charles Constantine Pise
