= Congressional Prayer Room =

Room in the United States Capitol

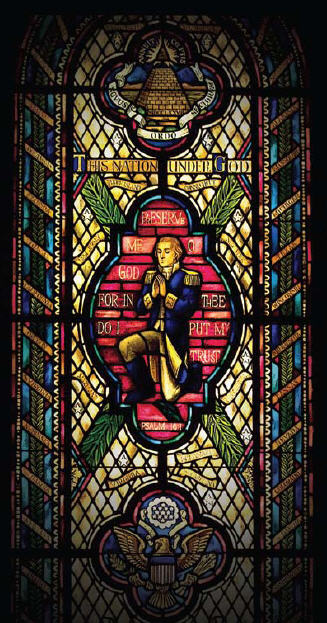
Stained-glass window of George Washington at prayer in the Congressional Prayer Room

The Congressional Prayer Room near the rotunda in the United States Capitol is a place set aside for the use of members of Congress who seek a quiet place for meditation or prayer. The space is not open to tour groups or visitors to the Capitol.

== History ==
The prayer room was established by Concurrent Resolution number 60 for the United States Senate and United States House of Representatives, passed in 1954, and officially opened in 1955.

The Concurrent Resolution included the following text:

"Resolved by the House of Representatives (the Senate concurring), That the Architect of the Capitol is hereby authorized and directed to make available a room, with facilities for prayer and meditation, for the use of Members of the Senate and House of Representatives. The Architect shall maintain the Prayer Room for individual use rather than assemblies and he shall provide appropriate symbols of religious unity and freedom of worship."

=== Congressional involvement ===
The official Congressional brochure describing the development of the Prayer Room credits a number of specific Congressional members with its establishment:

"Representative Brooks Hays of Arkansas introduced House Concurrent Resolution 60, Eighty-third Congress, in the House February 12, 1953, directing the setting apart of a place for this purpose. Senator Monroney of Oklahoma introduced a companion resolution, Senate Concurrent Resolution 14, Eighty-third Congress, in the Senate, February 13, 1953. House Concurrent Resolution 60 was passed by the House, July 17, 1953, and by the Senate May 4, 1954. Following passage of this resolution by the House, Joseph W. Martin, Jr., Speaker of the House of Representatives, made available an appropriate room on the House Side of the Capitol near the Rotunda and shortly after passage of the resolution by the Senate, named a special committee to arrange for the design and equipment of the Prayer Room. This Committee consisted of Representatives LeCompte of Iowa and St. George of New York, with Representative Hays as Chairman."

== Design ==
An interfaith or non-partisan design was integral to the vision of the prayer room so that it could be used by any Senator or Representative regardless of their faith. To that end, an interfaith advisory committee was established, including the Chaplain of the Senate, the Chaplain of the House of Representatives, and since they were both Protestant, two additional members representing the Roman Catholic and Jewish faiths.

The room includes a stained glass window of George Washington kneeling in prayer, with the words from Psalm 16:1, "Preserve me, O God, for in thee do I put my trust," and the words from President Abraham Lincoln's Gettysburg Address, "This Nation Under God".

The designers of the Prayer Room felt that the image of Washington was particularly appropriate, given his words from his first inaugural address:

"...it would be peculiarly improper to omit in this first official act, my fervent supplications to that Almighty Being who rules over the universe, who presides in the councils of nations, and whose providential aids can supply every human defect, that His benediction may consecrate to the liberties and happiness of the people of the United States, a Government instituted by themselves for these essential purposes, and may enable every instrument employed in its administration to execute with success the functions allotted to his charge."

In addition to an open Bible, the simple furnishings include two prayer benches, six chairs, two candles, plants, and an American flag. The Congressional brochure notes the importance of both the symbolism and the color schemes employed in the Prayer Room:

"On the altar, two vases constantly filled with fresh flowers tell of the beauty of God's world. At the right and left are two candelabra, each with the traditional seven lights. An American flag is at the right of the altar. In front of each candelabrum is a plain prie-dieu, or prayer bench, at which those who desire to do so may kneel. There are ten chairs facing the central window. The walls are pastel blue. The ceiling is the original painting, with cloud panels trimmed with gold. The rug is deep blue. The altar and prayer benches are of white oak. When illumined by the indirect lights of the shielded wall brackets, the room is a soft color harmony of blue and gold. Neither large enough for nor designed for a religious assembly, it is adequate for its avowed purpose --- a shrine at which the individual may renew his faith in his God and his loyalty to his country."

== Room 219 ==
In 2005, a group of congressional members began looking for a room in the Capitol large enough for voluntary group prayer, ultimately receiving permission to use Room 219. Although many individuals and small groups use Room 219, the original group now tries to meet weekly and calls itself the "Congressional Prayer Caucus."

== Prayers and Congressional sessions ==
The inclusion of a prayer before the opening of each session of both the House and the Senate traces its origins back to the days of the Continental Congress. The first prayer at that congress was delivered by Jacob Duché, who eventually betrayed the cause of American independence and maligned the Continental army in a letter to George Washington. The tradition of prayers ended at the Constitutional Convention and when Benjamin Franklin proposed a prayer on June 28, 1787, the Convention rejected his proposal. Said Franklin:

"I have lived, Sir, a long time, and the longer I live, the more convincing proofs I see of this truth: that God Governs in the affairs of men. And if a sparrow cannot fall to the ground without his notice, is it probable that an empire can rise without his aid? We have been assured, Sir, in the sacred writings, that 'except the Lord build the House they labour in vain that build it.' I firmly believe this; and I also believe that without his concurring aid we shall succeed in this political building no better, than the Builders of Babel . . . I therefore beg leave to move— that henceforth prayers imploring the assistance of Heaven, and its blessings on our deliberations, be held in this Assembly every morning before we proceed to business, and that one or more of the Clergy of this City be requested to officiate in that Service."

Supposedly, Alexander Hamilton argued against the motion because the delegates did not need to call in "foreign aid," though the story is perhaps apocryphal. However, it is certain that the Constitutional Convention did not even vote on Franklin's prayer motion, let alone pass the resolution. "After several unsuccessful attempts for silently postponing the matter by adjourning," it failed. Franklin himself wrote that "The [Constitutional] Convention, except three or four persons, thought Prayers unnecessary."

== Past religious usage ==
In its early days, the Capitol building was actually used for religious services in addition to governmental functions, with Sunday church services regularly held until after the Civil War. According to the Library of Congress exhibit "Religion and the Founding of the American Republic" "It is no exaggeration to say that on Sundays in Washington during the administrations of Thomas Jefferson (1801–1809) and of James Madison (1809–1817) the state became a church. Within a year of his inauguration, Jefferson began attending church services in the House of Representatives. Madison followed Jefferson's example, although unlike Jefferson, who rode on horseback to church in the Capitol, Madison came in a coach and four. Worship services in the House were acceptable to Jefferson because they were nondiscriminatory and voluntary. Preachers of every Protestant denomination appeared. (Catholic priests began officiating in 1826.)"

== See also ==
- Chaplain of the United States Senate
- Chaplain of the United States House of Representatives
- United States Capitol Rotunda
