= John Johnson Sayrs =

American Episcopal clergyman

John Johnson Sayrs (1774 – January 6, 1809) was an American Episcopal clergyman who served as Chaplain of the Senate.

== Early years ==
John Johnson Sayrs was born in 1774 in Newark, New Jersey, the son of Caleb Sayrs and his wife Sarah Johnson. Sayrs graduated from the College of New Jersey (Princeton University) in 1792.

== Ministry ==
On January 5, 1795, Sayrs became minister of Trinity Church, Fishkill, New York, and Christ Church, Poughkeepsie, New York. On January 14, 1799, he became rector of Durham Parish, Charles County, Maryland; there he also operated a flourishing school. In 1804 he became the first rector of St. John’s Parish, Georgetown, D.C., a post in which he continued until his early death at age 36 in 1809. His body was buried beneath the chancel of the church, which was designed by William Thornton, architect of the Capitol.

In 1806-1807 he served as Chaplain of the Senate. Francis Scott Key was a friend and vestryman of his congregation. Key penned Sayrs’ epitaph which appears on a tablet in St. John’s Church.

== Personal life ==
Sayrs married Sophia Sprake (sometimes, spelled ‘’Speake’’) during his time at Durham Parish. They were the parents of two sons, one of whom died unmarried, the other, John Johnson Sayrs, Jr.

Religious titles
Preceded by Edward Gantt	7th US Senate Chaplain; December 3, 1806 – November 9, 1807	Succeeded by A. T. McCormick
