= William Henry Milburn =

American clergyman

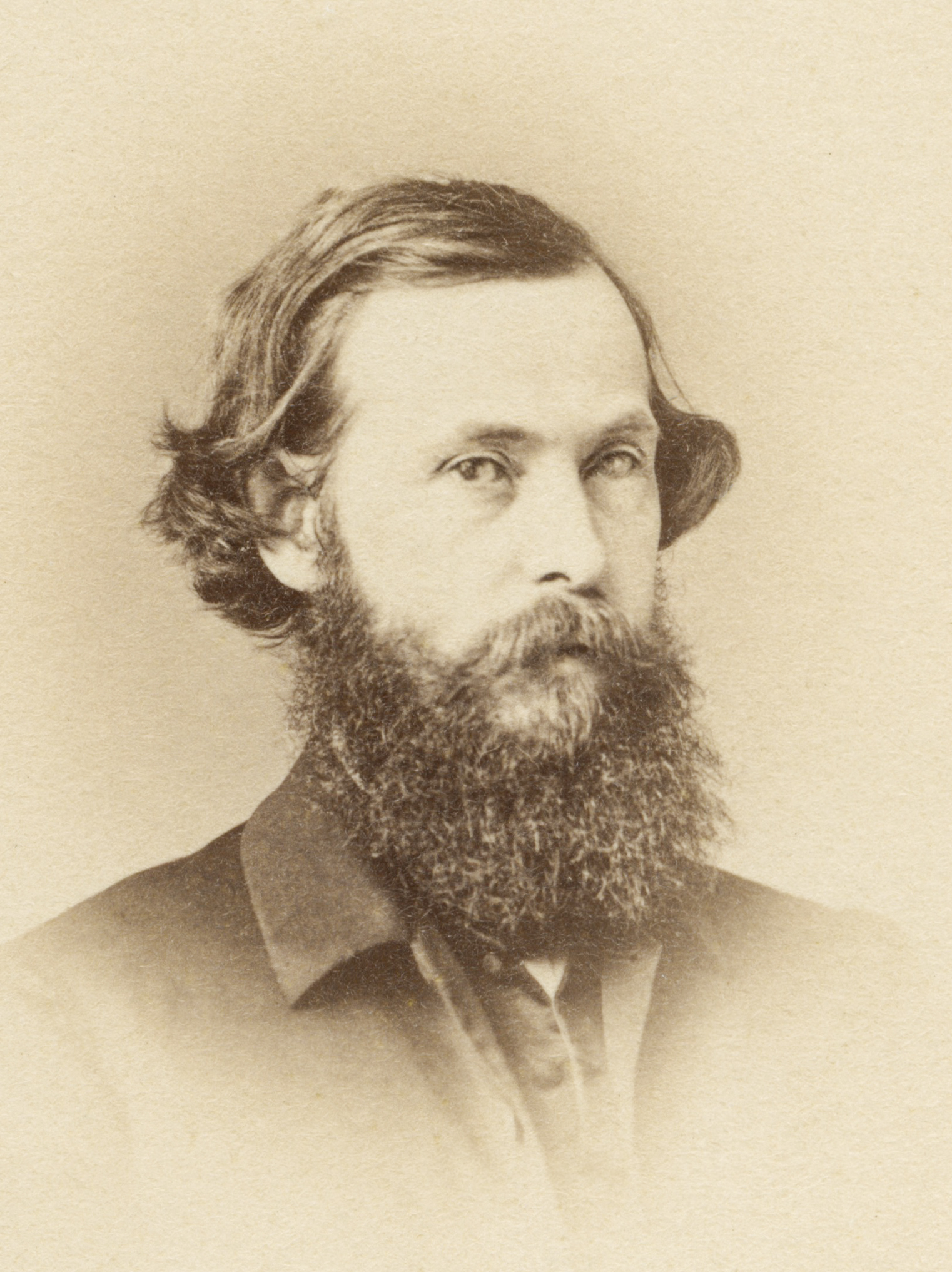
Reverend William Henry Milburn by J Gurney & Son photographists at 707 Broadway, NYC c.1863

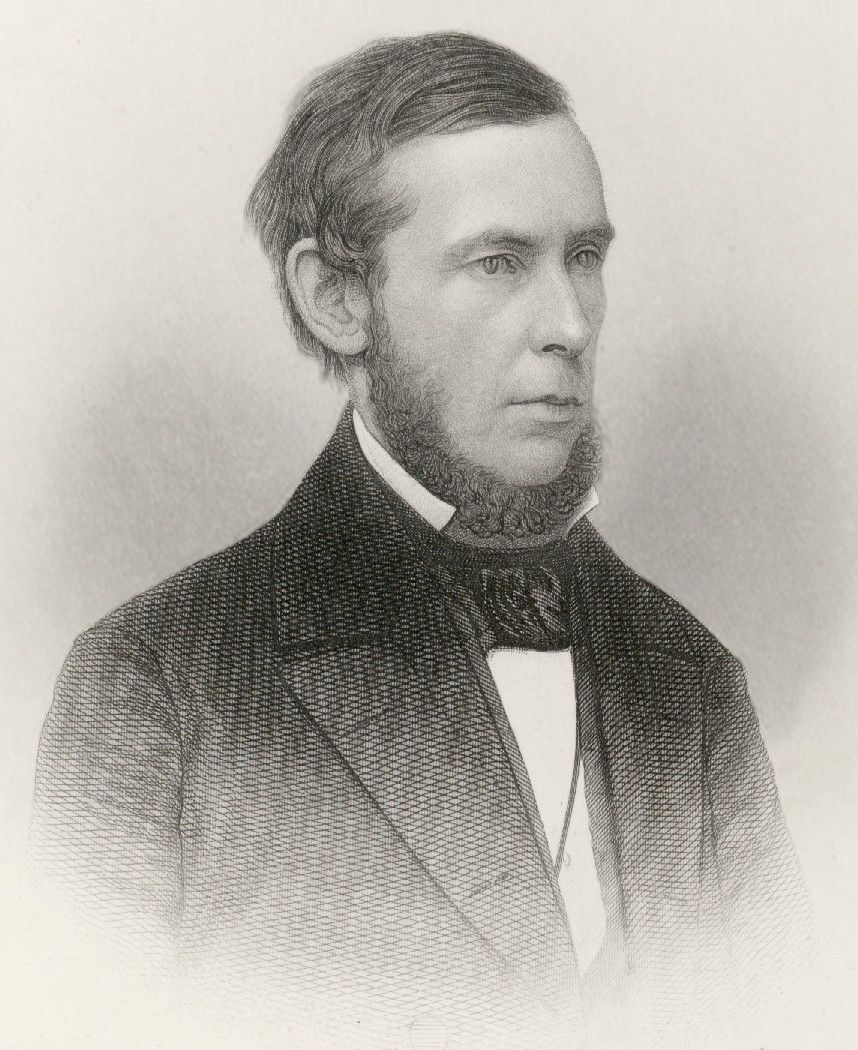
The Rev. William Henry Milburn

William Henry Milburn (September 26, 1823 – April 11, 1903) was a blind Methodist clergyman. A friend of notables including Henry Wadsworth Longfellow, he was Chaplain of the United States House of Representatives in the years 1845 and 1853, and from 1885 to 1893. Thereafter, he served as Chaplain of the Senate from 1893 until his death in 1903.

== Early life ==
William Henry Milburn was born September 26, 1823, in Philadelphia, Pennsylvania, to Nicholas and Ann (Wyeth) Milburn, who were devout Methodists and often hosted well-known Methodist preachers in their home. His father was a prosperous merchant, until reverses in the economy led to the failure of his business. The family relocated to Jacksonville, Illinois, then still "the West" in 1838. There, Milburn was raised.

Before their move to Philadelphia, Milburn's left eye had been injured by a piece of glass thrown by a playmate. Kept in a dark room for over a year to attempt to aid healing, the eye was permanently blinded when doctors tried to remove the callus that had formed over it, using some kind of caustic. The impairment of that eye led to a similar impairment in the other, causing him to be partially blind in his youth, and totally blind by his forties. Milburn recounts this incident in his autobiography.

Milburn was chiefly self-educated, though he had tutors in Latin and Greek, until enrolling Illinois College from which he was unable to graduate due to his waning eyesight. At the urging of minister friends including Peter Cartwright, Milburn became a Methodist circuit rider in 1843.

== Ministry ==
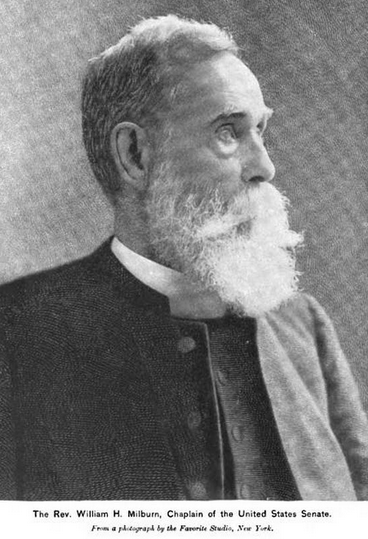
William H. Milburn later in life, from an 1896 publication.

His early ministry consisted of hundreds of miles of travel on horseback each month, throughout the Midwest. On a steamboat in the Ohio he delivered a sermon in which he rebuked Congressmen on board for their intemperate behavior. This led to his name being proposed for Chaplain of the House of Representatives, a post to which he was elected in 1845 and reelected in 1853.

Thereafter, in succession Milburn served Methodist churches in Montgomery, Alabama and Mobile, Alabama, where, having been tried for heresy, he spent several years serving a free church. After serving his second term as House Chaplain (1853) Milburn moved to New York City where he was pastor of the Pacific Street Methodist Church, and then the John Street Methodist Church, while also engaged in a life of lecturing. He was elected for two more terms as Chaplain of the House in 1885 and in 1887. From 1893 to 1903, he served as the Chaplain of the United States Senate. He preached and lectured throughout the United States, Canada, Great Britain and Ireland. Among his published works, his autobiography, Ten Years of Preacher-Life remains a vivid work of non-fiction and is readily available on line.

Milburn died in Santa Barbara, California, on April 11, 1903.

== Personal life ==
On August 13, 1843, in Baltimore, Maryland, Milburn was married to Cornelia Wilmot. She was the author of Poems of Faith and Affection. Their four children (including a daughter Fanny), all died young. He adopted two children of Rev John Gemley.

Religious titles
Preceded by William Mitchel Daily	36th US House Chaplain; December 1, 1845 – December 7, 1846	Succeeded by William T.S. Sprole
Preceded by James Gallagher	41st US House Chaplain; December 5, 1853 – March 4, 1855	Succeeded by None
Preceded by John Summerfield Lindsay	52nd US House Chaplain; December 7, 1885 – August 7, 1893	Succeeded by Samuel W. Haddaway
Preceded by John George Butler	49th US Senate Chaplain; April 6, 1893 – November 23, 1903	Succeeded by F.J. Prettyman
