= Frederick Brown Harris =

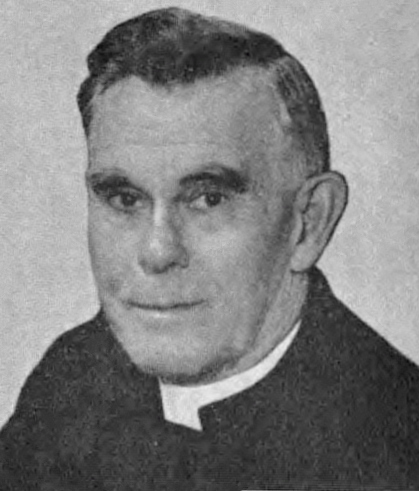
Frederick Brown Harris

Frederick Brown Harris (April 10, 1883 – August 18, 1970), a Methodist clergyman has the distinction of the longest service record as Chaplain of the Senate (24 years), in a term of service interrupted by the chaplaincy of Peter Marshall.

== Early life ==
Frederick Brown Harris was born April 10, 1883, in Worcester, England, the son of George Thomas and Ellen (Griffiths) Harris; his father was also a minister. He came with his family to the United States as a small boy. He was raised in New Jersey and studied at Dickinson College and Drew Theological Seminary (1912). He was ordained to the Methodist ministry in 1909.

== Ministry ==
Harris served these pastorates in succession: Greenwood Avenue Methodist Church, Trenton, New Jersey, 1909–13; St. Luke's Methodist Church, Long Branch, New Jersey, 1914–18; Grace Methodist Church, New York City (1918–1924).

In 1924 he was called to serve Foundry United Methodist Church, Washington, D.C., a pastorate he would hold for more than thirty years. During his pastorate there, he would serve as Chaplain of the Senate (1942–1947) and (1949–1969), his time of service interrupted by the chaplaincy of Peter Marshall.

Illustrious world leaders were numbered among those who attended worship at Foundry or became his friends in Congress, including President Franklin D. Roosevelt and Prime Minister Winston Churchill who attended a special service at Foundry on December 25, 1941., Madame Chaing Kai-Shek (Soong Mei-ling), and Syngman Rhee He conducted the funerals of President Herbert Hoover, Senator Robert A. Taft, and General Douglas MacArthur. Harris retired from Foundry in June 1955.

== Personal life ==
Harris married Helen Louise Streeter on June 4, 1914 at the John Street Methodist Church in New York City; her father Dr. Lewis Richard Streeter was pastor of that church.

Religious titles
Preceded by ZeBarney Thorne Phillips	56th US Senate Chaplain; October 10, 1942 – January 4, 1947	Succeeded by Peter Marshall
Preceded by Peter Marshall	58th US Senate Chaplain; February 3, 1949 – January 9, 1969	Succeeded by Edward L.R. Elson
