= Peter Marshall (Presbyterian minister) =

Scottish-born American clergy (1902–1949)

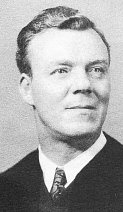
- Peter Marshall

Personal life
- Born: May 27, 1902 Coatbridge, North Lanarkshire, Scotland
- Died: January 26, 1949 (aged 46) Washington, D.C., US
- Education: Columbia Theological Seminary

Religious life
- Religion: Presbyterian
- Ordination: Presbyterian

Senior posting
- Previous post: Chaplain

Peter Marshall (May 27, 1902 – January 26, 1949) was a Scottish-born American preacher, pastor of the New York Avenue Presbyterian Church in Washington, D.C., and was appointed as Chaplain of the United States Senate. He is remembered popularly from the success of A Man Called Peter (1951), a biography written by his widow, Catherine Marshall, and the book's 1955 film adaptation, which was nominated for an Academy Award for its cinematography.

== Early life and education ==
Born in Coatbridge, North Lanarkshire, Scotland, a poverty-stricken coal-mining community, where he was reared by his mother and stepfather. From 1916-1921 he studied electrical engineering at Coatbridge Technical School. He enrolled in evening classes to study for the ministry, while working in the mines by day, but his progress was slow. In 1927, a cousin offered to pay Peter's way to the U.S., where he could receive proper ministerial training. He graduated from Columbia Theological Seminary in 1931.

== Ministry ==
He was called as the pastor of the First Presbyterian Church, a small, rural church in Covington, Georgia. After a brief pastorate, Marshall accepted a call to Atlanta's Westminster Presbyterian Church in 1933.

In 1937, Marshall became pastor of the New York Avenue Presbyterian Church in Washington, D.C. In 1946, he was appointed as U.S. Senate Chaplain, serving from January 4, 1947, until his sudden death of a heart attack just over two years later, at age 46.

== Marriage and family ==
In Atlanta, Marshall met his future wife, Catherine Wood, then a student at Agnes Scott College. They married on November 4, 1936, and had one son, Peter John Marshall (January 21, 1940 – September 8, 2010), who followed his father into the Presbyterian clergy and ran a national ministry, Peter Marshall Ministries, from Orleans, Massachusetts.

== Legacy ==
The Dr. Peter Marshall School in Anaheim, California was named after him.

Marshall's life has been portrayed through literary, theatrical, and staged adaptations:

- Catherine Marshall wrote a biography of her husband, A Man Called Peter (1951), which was a popular success.
- It was adapted as a a film of the same title, released in 1955, which was nominated for the Oscar for Best Cinematography. Directed by Henry Koster, it featured Richard Todd as Peter Marshall, and Jean Peters as Catherine Marshall. Todd studied tape recordings of several Marshall sermons from 1947 to 1948; some of these historic recordings were later released to the public by Caedmon Records.
- The biography was also adapted as a stage play by the same name, produced in 1955.

== Archival collections ==
The Presbyterian Historical Society in Philadelphia, Pennsylvania, has an undated carbon copy transcript of Catherine Marshall’s biography, A Man Called Peter. The undated transcript includes penciled annotations. The Society also holds a collection of Marshall’s sermons from his years as a pastor at Westminster Presbyterian Church and New York Avenue Presbyterian Church. The McCain Library at Agnes Scott College in Decatur, Georgia holds a large collection of papers donated by the estate of Catherine Marshall. Some of these papers included correspondence from Peter Marshall, photographs and recordings of him. Catherine Marshall donated a number of audio recordings of Peter Marshall's sermons to the U.S. Library of Congress.

Religious titles
Preceded by Frederick Brown Harris	57th US Senate Chaplain; January 4, 1947 – January 26, 1949	Succeeded by Frederick Brown Harris
