= F. J. Prettyman =

Methodist clergyman (1860-1945)

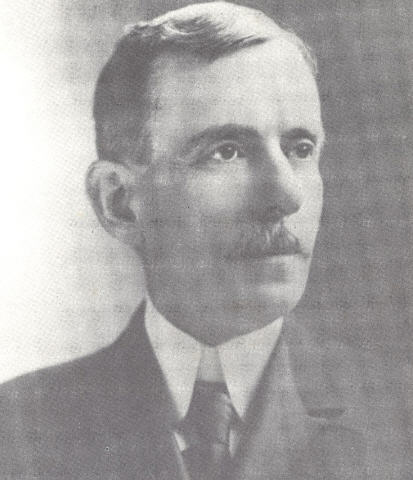
The Rev. Forrest Johnston Prettyman

Forrest Johnston Prettyman (April 7, 1860 – October 12, 1945) was a Methodist clergyman who served as Chaplain of the Senate from 1903 to 1904 and 1913 to 1921.

== Early years ==
Prettyman was born on April 7, 1860, in Brookeville, Maryland, the son of Elijah Barrett Prettyman and Lydia Forrest Prettyman. He was educated at Rockville Academy, Emerson Institute, St. John's College, Annapolis, Maryland, and Washington and Lee University.

== Ministry ==
He served in Baltimore as a supply pastor in 1884-5. Thereafter he served these churches in succession: St Paul’s, Baltimore, 1888–1891; Lexington, Virginia; Martinsburg, West Virginia; Staunton, Virginia; Mt Vernon Place, Washington, D.C.; Trinity & Calvary, Baltimore, 1905-1909. He served as Chaplain of the Senate (1903–1904) and (1913–1921). Following his ministry in Washington, he returned to Baltimore to serve Wilson Memorial 1927-1931. Thereafter he was pastor in Fredericksburg, Virginia (1930–37). He retired in October 1937.

Prettyman died October 12, 1945, and was buried in Rockville Cemetery, Maryland, alongside his wife, parents and children.

== Personal life ==
Prettyman married Elizabeth Rebecca Stonestreet on October 17, 1888. Their son, E. Barrett Prettyman, was a U.S. federal judge.

Religious titles
Preceded by William Henry Milburn	50th US Senate Chaplain; November 23, 1903 – December 14, 1903	Succeeded by Edward Everett Hale
Preceded by Ulysses Grant Baker Pierce	53rd US Senate Chaplain; March 13, 1913 – January 21, 1921	Succeeded by Joseph Johnston Muir
