= Joseph Johnstone Muir =

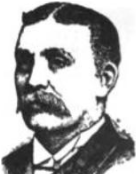

Chaplain of the United States Senate
- In office January 21, 1921 – November 17, 1927

Personal details
- Born: July 30, 1847 Parsonstown, Ireland
- Died: November 17, 1927 (aged 80) Washington, D.C., U.S.
- Resting place: Rock Creek Cemetery; Washington, D.C., U.S.
- Spouse: Lizzie Glover (m. 1868)
- Occupation: Clergyman

Joseph Johnstone Muir (July 30, 1847 – November 17, 1927) was a Baptist clergyman who served as Chaplain of the United States Senate.

== Early years ==
Joseph Johnstone Muir was born in Parsonstown, Ireland, on July 30, 1847, to Scots-Irish parents, Alexander Johnstone and Mary Faith Stothard Muir. He worked for a time in business in Dublin before moving to the United States in 1863. He continued in business in New York.

== Ministry ==
In 1869 he was licensed to preach by the Baptist church. He served in succession: the Baptist church in Oxford, New Jersey; the East Marion Baptist Church on Long Island; First Baptist Church of Ticonderoga, New York; McDougal Street Baptist Church, New York City; the Park Baptist Church in Port Richmond, New York, on Staten Island; North Street Baptist Church, Philadelphia; the E Street or Third Baptist Church of Washington, D.C., and the Temple Baptist Church also in Washington.

He was elected Chaplain of the Senate on January 21, 1921, serving until his death in Washington on November 17, 1927. He was buried at Rock Creek Cemetery.

== Personal life ==
In 1868 he married Lizzie Glover; they were the parents of three sons and two daughters – Edward A. T. Muir, Charles Stothard Muir, John McM. Glover Muir, Florence Evelyn May Muir and Edna Alexandra Muir.

Religious titles
Preceded by F.J. Prettyman	54th US Senate Chaplain; January 21, 1921 – November 21, 1927	Succeeded by ZeBarney Thorne Phillips
