= Ulysses Grant Baker Pierce =

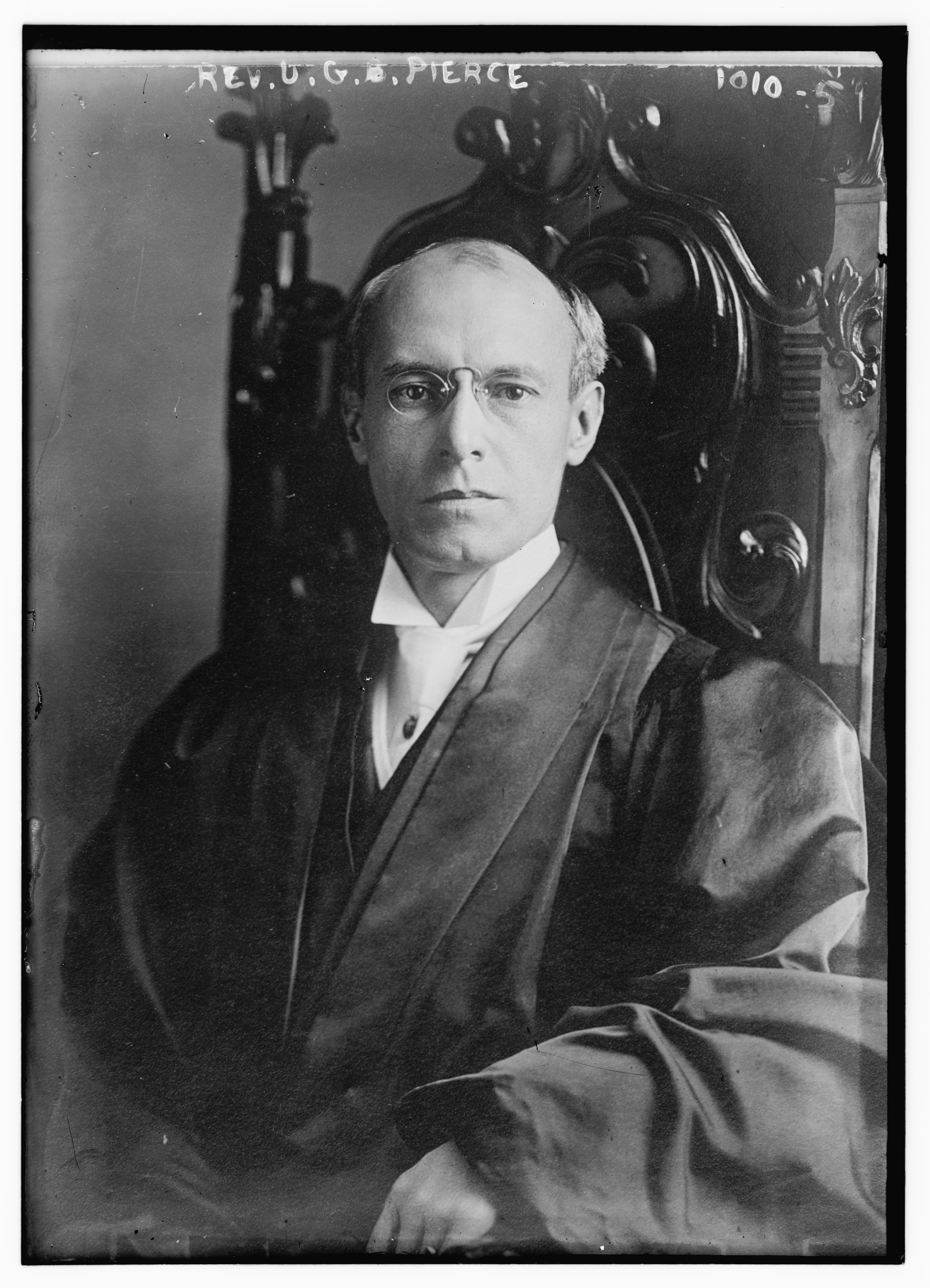
Rev. U.G.B. Pierce

Ulysses Grant Baker Pierce (1865–1943) was a Unitarian minister who served as Chaplain of the United States Senate (1909–1913).

== Early years ==
Pierce was born in Providence, Rhode Island on July 17, 1865. He received degrees from Hillsdale College and Harvard Divinity School (1890–1891). He was ordained in July 1891 at Decorah, Iowa.

== Ministry ==
Following his ordination, he served congregations in Decorah, Iowa (1891–1892), Pomona, California (1893–1897), and Ithaca, New York (1898–1901).

From 1901 to 1943, Pierce was the pastor of All Souls Unitarian Church in Washington, D.C. He held the position of Chaplain of the United States Senate from 1909 to 1913, under President William Howard Taft.

Pierce died on October 10, 1943, at the age of 78. His ashes were entombed in a niche in the southwest corner of the Court of the Founders, All Soul's Unitarian Church, Washington, D.C.

== Personal life ==
On July 27, 1891, at Allegan, Michigan, Pierce married Helen Florence Lonsbury, daughter of George and Sarah Lonsbury.

Religious titles
Preceded by Edward Everett Hale	52nd US Senate Chaplain; June 18, 1909 – March 13, 1913	Succeeded by F.J. Prettyman
