= James Jones Wilmer =

James Jones Wilmer (January 15, 1750 – 1814) was an Episcopal clergyman who served as Chaplain of the Senate of the United States.

== Early life ==
James Jones Wilmer was born in 1750 to Simon Wilmer and his wife Mary Price Wilmer, in Kent County, Maryland. He studied at St Paul's School (London), before matriculating at Christ Church, Oxford. He was ordained in England in 1773.

== Ministry ==
In 1779, Wilmer was rector of Shrewsbury Church, South Sassafras, Kent County. In 1780, the rectors of the local parishes gathered at Emmanuel's Parish Hall (Chestertown, Maryland). Wilmer proposed renaming the church to the Protestant Episcopal Church, which was adopted as the name of the American branch of the Anglican Church.

In 1783 he was rector of St John's and St. George's, Harford County. In 1786 he moved to North Sassafrass and Augustine in Cecil County. He was residing in Havre de Grace in 1793, and had adopted some of the tenets of Emanuel Swedenborg. Upon his renouncing them in 1799, he took charge of Trinity Church, Wilmington, Delaware. Returning to Maryland the following year, he served parishes in Baltimore, in Harford County and in Prince George's County. He spent four years from 1805 in Virginia.

In 1809 he was Chaplain of the Senate. Thereafter he returned to Havre de Grace, then to Baltimore, where he edited the "Baltimore American". He was made chaplain of the army in 1813, and died in 1814, his sixty-sixth year.

== Personal life ==
On 21 May 1783, he married Sarah Magee. They were the parents of five children including Mary Ann Wlmer. His nephew, Rev. William Holland Wilmer, wrote a popular manual of Episcopal church practices and also became the 11th President of the College of William and Mary.

Religious titles
Preceded by Robert Elliott	10th US Senate Chaplain; May 24, 1809 – December 4, 1809	Succeeded by Obadiah Bruen Brown
