= Edward L. R. Elson =

American Presbyterian clergyman and chaplain of the US Senate (1906–1993)

The Reverend Edward L. R. Elson
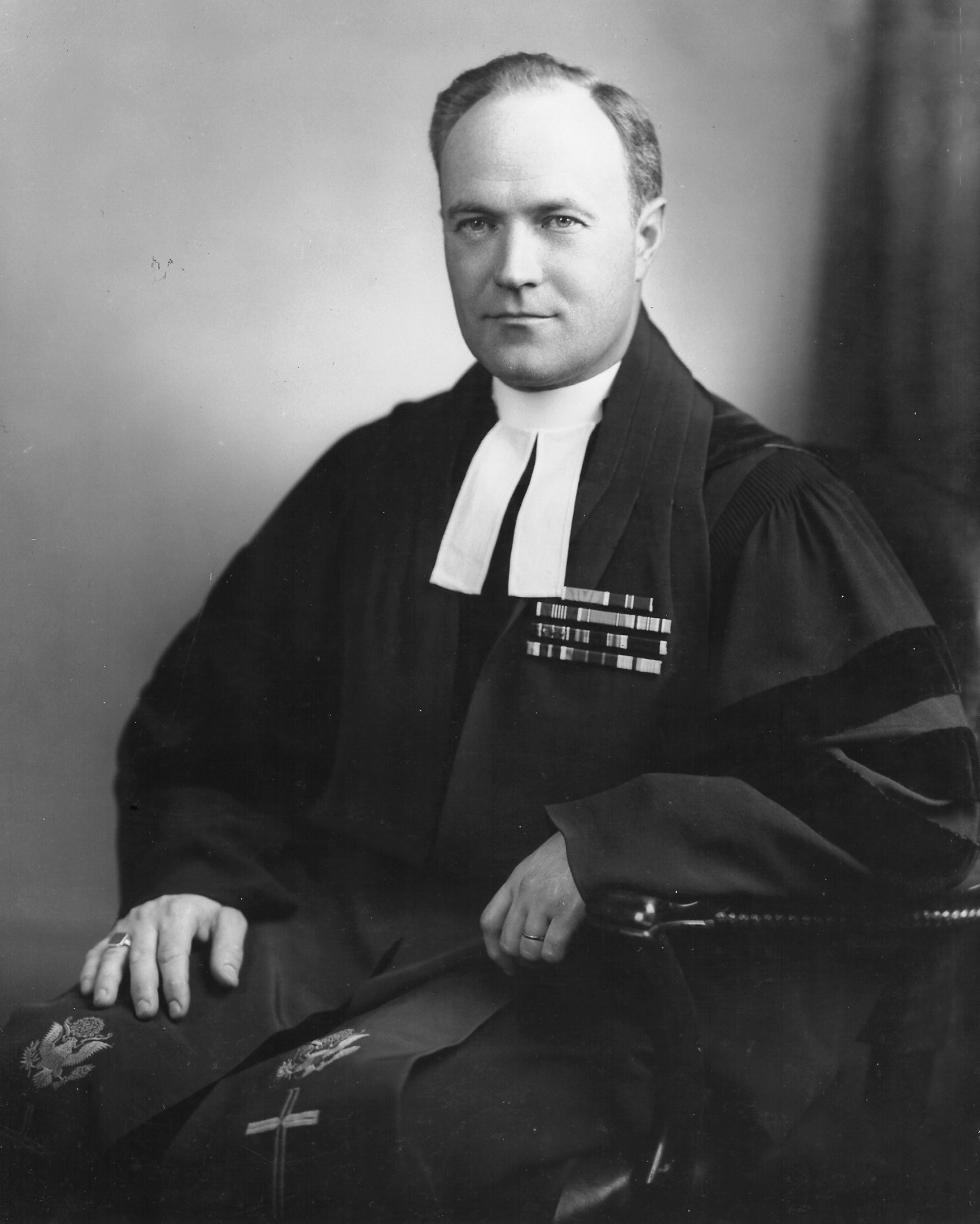
- Elson photographed with military ribbons reflecting his U.S. Army Chaplain service in 1940s
- Born: December 23, 1906; Ohio
- Died: August 25, 1993 (aged 86); Washington, DC
- Resting place: Arlington National Cemetery
- Education: Asbury College
- Occupation: Presbyterian minister
- Office: Chaplain of the United States Senate
- Term: 1969–1981
- Predecessor: Frederick Brown Harris
- Successor: Richard C. Halverson
- Military career
- Branch: United States Army Reserve, United States Army
- Service years: 1931–1944
- Rank: Colonel
- Unit: Chaplain Corps

Edward Lee Roy Elson (December 23, 1906 – August 25, 1993) was a Presbyterian minister and Chaplain of the United States Senate.

== Life ==
Edward Lee Roy Elson, the first of nine children, was born in Ohio, to Leroy Elson, a locomotive engineer, and his wife, Pearl. Early on he was encouraged to study music and gave concerts in the Pittsburgh area on the cornet with his sister Hazel playing the piano. One of his favorite memories of high school was the time he and his sister gave a concert in the very early days of radio on KDKA, the pioneer radio station.

Dr. Elson had his education at Asbury College in Wilmore, Kentucky, and then went to University of Southern California for a master's in theology. He married Frances Sandys, a fellow Asbury College student in 1929. At about the time of his ordination in 1930, he learned that his young wife had a very serious illness, and owing largely to this, he chose to go and serve at the La Jolla Presbyterian Church because of its proximity to the Scripps Clinic in La Jolla, California. His wife died three years later on his birthday.

Having been invited to join the American Seminar in Europe and Russia, Elson took an eye-opening trip to Europe in the summer of 1936. Shortly after returning from Europe, Elson married Helen Chittick, a member of his church.

After having been in the chaplain reserves for ten years, he resigned his position with the church and went on active duty with the Army in 1941, arriving in France in December 1944. Not long after, General Frank Wilburn requested that Elson be his personal representative at the execution by firing squad of a soldier for desertion. This soldier, Eddie Slovik, was the first to be so executed by the American military since the American Civil War. Another of his wartime assignments was to interview members of the clergy who had been imprisoned at Dachau. After the German surrender, he was asked to represent Dwight D. Eisenhower before the Consistory, a ruling body of the German Protestant church, in order to determine how the German Church would be rebuilt.

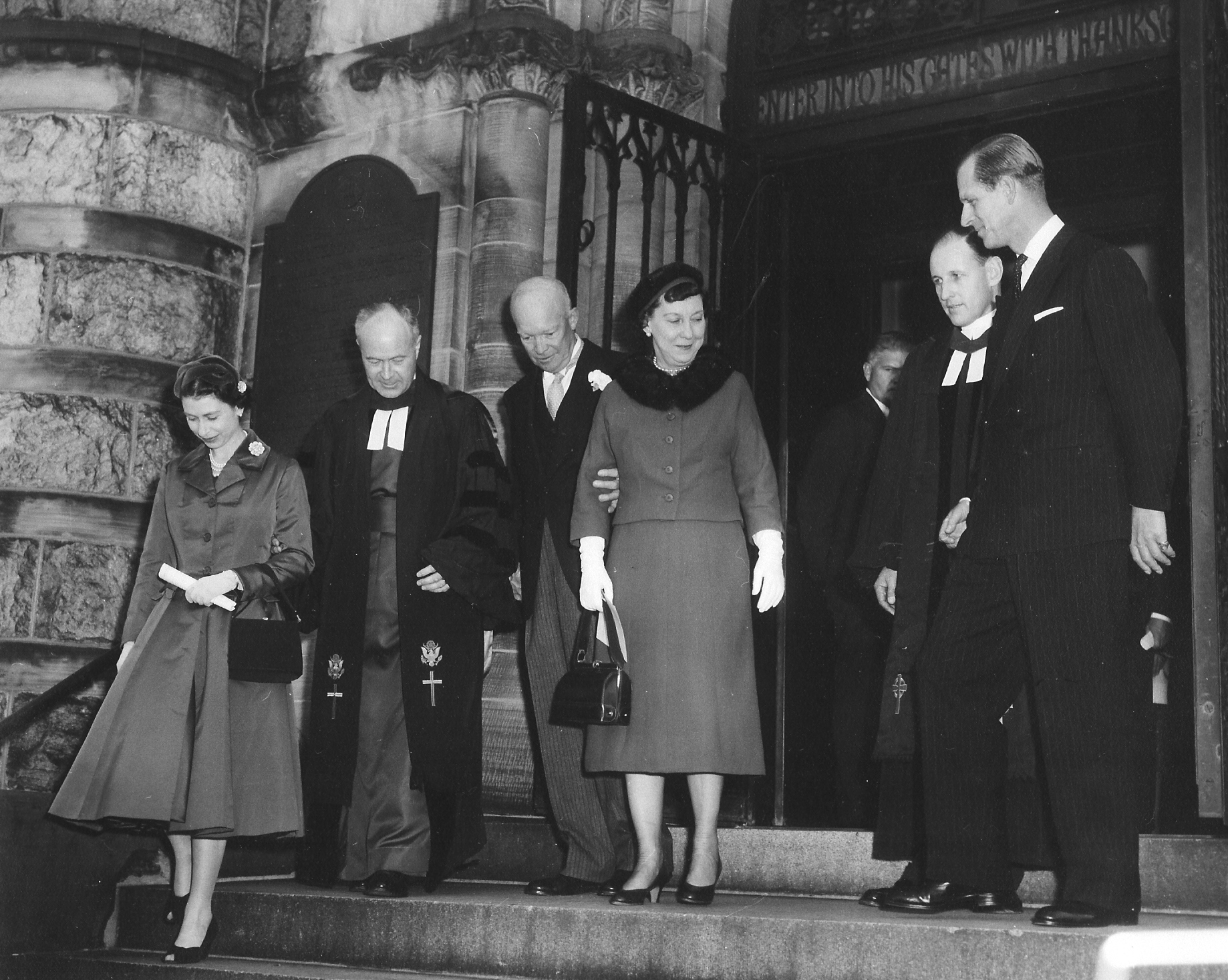
Elson (second from left) accompanies (from left) Queen Elizabeth II, Dwight and Mamie Eisenhower, and Prince Philip on a visit to National Presbyterian Church in 1957.

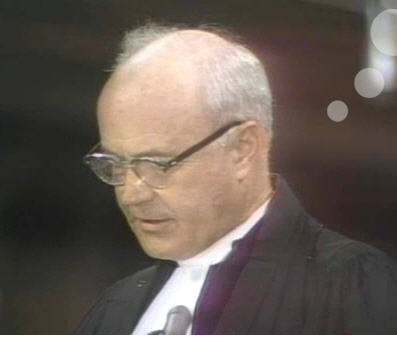
Elson at the funeral of former President Dwight D. Eisenhower on 31 March 1969.

Upon returning to the U.S. from the war, he soon learned that he was a candidate for the pastorate of the Covenant-First Presbyterian Church in Washington, D.C. and ultimately became its pastor in 1946. One of his first duties there was to oversee the transition of the Covenant-First Presbyterian Church to the National Presbyterian Church, a move that had been in the works for many years. Eisenhower attended a pre-inaugural service at the church. A few days later, on February 1, 1953, Dr. Elson baptized the president and admitted him to formal membership of the church. The baptism came after the president's brother, Milton, confirmed that though Ike had regularly attended the River Brethren Church in Abilene, Kansas, he had never officially joined the church nor had he been baptized. In the 1960s, Elson oversaw, along with the building committee, the construction of a large new church, which was dedicated in 1967 on Eisenhower's birthday, October 14.

In 1967, he was named to a special committee of the Presbyterian General Assembly to study the Vietnam War. In September 1967, while he and his wife were still at their summer home in Cape Breton Island, he received a phone call from the White House asking him to be on a team to observe the upcoming elections in South Viet Nam.

Dr. Elson was elected to the position of Chaplain of the United States Senate in 1969, retiring from that position after having served for a little over twelve years in February, 1981. During his tenure at the Senate, he invited the first woman, Wilmina Rowland, to offer the opening prayer.

Elson and his wife Helen Chittick (1915–2007) are buried in Arlington National Cemetery.

== Works ==
- America's Spiritual Recovery, 1954
- And Still He speaks, The words of the Risen Christ, 1960
- Inevitable encounter, 1962
- Prayers offered by the chaplain of the Senate of the United States/ Edward L.R. Elson, at the opening of the daily sessions of the United States Senate during the 96th and 97th congresses, 1979–1981, 1980
- Prayers offered by the chaplain of the Senate of the United States/ Edward L.R. Elson, during the Ninety-second Congress, 1971–72, 1973
- Wide was His Parish, An Autobiography, 1986

== Bibliography ==
- Wide was His Parish, An Autobiography, Tyndale Press, 1986, ISBN 978-0-8423-8205-2

Religious titles
Preceded by Frederick Brown Harris	59th US Senate Chaplain; January 9, 1969 – February 2, 1981	Succeeded by Richard C. Halverson
