= A. T. McCormick =

American chaplain (1761–1841)

Andrew Thomas McCormick (1761 – April 27, 1841) was an Episcopal clergyman and Chaplain of the United States Senate. Historians sometimes render his name as Alexander Thomas McCormick, likely confusing him with his brother Alexander Hugh McCormick, but his tombstone reads "Andrew Thomas McCormick".

== Early years ==
McCormick was born in County Donegal in Ireland in 1761. He was brought up as a Presbyterian. He came to the United States and became an Episcopalian. He was made a deacon by the Rt. Rev. Dr. Thomas John Claggett, Bishop of Maryland, on June 15, 1794. The date he was ordained as a priest is not on record.

== Ministry ==
McCormick became assistant rector in Queen Anne Parish, (St. Barnabas Church (Upper Marlboro, Maryland)), Prince George's County, Maryland. In 1796, he took charge of a classical school in the new city of Washington, D.C. prior to the creation of a public school system. The Rev. George Ralph, his predecessor in the school, had recently resigned to take charge of the newly organized parish of Washington, known as Christ Church, Washington Parish.

In 1798, Mr. McCormick helped Ralph establish the first Episcopal Church in Washington, Christ Church, and became assistant at it. It was opened in a converted barn. Many notable early residents attended services there, including Presidents Jefferson and John Quincy Adams. On May 4, 1806, he was elected rector, a position he would continue to fill through 1823. In 1807, the church moved to a larger brick structure near the Navy Yard. John Quincy Adams was a Unitarian, not an Episcopalian, but decided while Secretary of State to go to Christ Church. The reason, he wrote in his diary in 1819, was that its rector, Andrew McCormick, was the only preacher in town worth hearing. I have at last given the preference to Mr. McCormick, of the Episcopal Church, Adams noted in the entry for October 24, and spoke to him last week for a pew.

During this period, McCormick served as Chaplain of the Senate (1804–1805 and 1807–1808).

== Later years ==
McCormick served on the board of trustees of Washington's Eastern Free School, one of only two schools in the city, from 1802 to 1816 and as its president from 1816 to 1841 and was credited with the school's survival. His nephew Hugh was the teacher at the school from 1825 to 1844. McCormick died in 1841 at age of 80.

The McCormick School located on the east side of the 1200 block of 3rd St., SE and opened in 1870 was either named for him or for his nephew Hugh. It was closed in 1909 and torn down around 1915.

Religious titles
| Preceded by Edward Gantt | 5th US Senate Chaplain; December 9, 1801 – November 6, 1804 | Succeeded by Edward Gantt |
| Preceded by John Johnson Sayrs | 8th US Senate Chaplain; November 10, 1807 – November 9, 1808 | Succeeded by Robert Elliott |
