= Edward Young Higbee =

American clergyman (1810–1871)

Edward Young Higbee (1810 – December 10, 1871) was an Episcopal clergyman. Born in New Jersey in 1812, Higbee was ordained a deacon in 1829, and became rector of Trinity Church in Washington, D.C., in 1834. From 1835 to 1836 he served as Chaplain of the United States Senate before becoming assistant rector of Trinity Church, New York, where he served for the remainder of his career. He married twice, and had four children by his second wife. He died unexpectedly in 1871.⋅

== Early years ==
Higbee was born in 1810 in Mount Holly Township, New Jersey, the son of Rev. Daniel Higbee and his wife Beulah Hollinshead. He was educated at General Theological Seminary from which he graduated in 1829.

== Ministry ==
On July 9, 1829, he was ordained a deacon, and at once took charge of the parishes of St. John and St. George in Harford County, Maryland, his ministry being based in Havre de Grace. He was ordained a priest on June 27, 1833, in St. John's Church, Havre de Grace.

In 1834 he accepted the rectorship of the recently organized Trinity Church in Washington, D.C., Daniel Webster being among his friends there. He was elected to Chaplain of the Senate in 1835–1836. In 1836 he was elected to serve as assistant rector of Trinity Church, New York, which he served admirably during the remaining years of his active ministry (1836–1871). Much of his work centered upon Trinity Chapel, one of six houses of worship under the auspices of Trinity Church. During his ministry, Trinity Church built its current building, whose tower was at the time of its completion in 1846, the tallest building in New York and would not be surpassed until 1890. Higbee was found dead in his room early on Sunday morning, December 10, 1871.

== Personal life ==
Higbee married first Mary Sophia Thomas (1815–1836), the daughter of Abraham and Mary Thomas. Their only child, Edward, died at birth. Higbee married secondly, Frances Henley in December 1837. Their children were: John Henley Higbee, Fanny Lear Higbee, Beulah Alice Higbee, Eliza Henley Higbee and Daniel Higbee.

Religious titles
Preceded by Frederick Winslow Hatch	30th US Senate Chaplain; December 23, 1835 – December 28, 1836	Succeeded by John Reinhard Goodman
