= Robert Elliott (chaplain) =

Scots-Irish Presbyterian clergyman

Robert Elliott was a Scots-Irish Presbyterian clergyman who served as the chaplain of the United States House of Representatives (1806–1807) and Chaplain of the Senate of the United States (1808–1809).

Prior to 1779, Elliott along with Rev. Edward Markland, founded a classical school at Easton, Maryland. This school was combined in 1779 with a school conducted by Rev. John Bowie to form the Easton Academy. In this venture, Elliott was professor of mathematics, history and geography. The venture was not a lasting success due to the incompatible temperaments of the various professors.

Thereafter Elliott relocated to Strasburg, Pennsylvania, where in late October 1802, he advertised the opening of an academy under his superintendence, on January 1, 1803. Elliott remained there until he and his wife sold their house and moved to Washington, D.C., so that Elliott could accept the responsibility of chaplain to Congress.

On December 1, 1806, Elliot was appointed chaplain of the U.S. House of Representatives. Reverend Elliot later served as Chaplain of the Senate. In Washington, Elliott was also the principal of the Eastern Academy school on Capitol Hill, which opened on May 19, 1806.

== Personal life ==
On April 12, 1800, he was married to Eliza King, Daughter of Robert King, Esq., of Chestnut Level, Lancaster County, Pennsylvania. The ceremony was performed by the Rev. Francis Allison Latta.

Religious titles
Preceded by James Laurie	7th US House Chaplain; December 4, 1806 – October 30, 1807	Succeeded by Obadiah Bruen Brown
Preceded by A. T. McCormick	9th US Senate Chaplain; November 10, 1808 – May 23, 1809	Succeeded by James Jones Wilmer
