= Obadiah Bruen Brown =

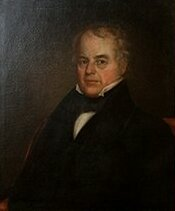
Obadiah Bruen Brown

Obadiah Bruen Brown (July 20, 1779 – May 2, 1852) was a Baptist clergyman who served as Chaplain of the House (1807–1809 and 1814–1815) and as Chaplain of the Senate (1809–1810).

== Early life ==
Obadiah Bruen Brown was born in Newark, New Jersey, on July 20, 1779, the son of Mary Bruen Brown and Brown. Raised a Presbyterian, Brown started attending the Baptist Church when it was organized in Newark. At age 24, he joined this church and soon the members of the congregation began encouraging him to enter the ministry. Within a few months, O.B. Brown had gone to Scotch Plains, New Jersey, to study theology with the Rev. William Van Horn, pastor of the most prominent Baptist church in the New Jersey-New York area.

== Ministry ==
Brown was invited to Washington, D.C. in 1807 to preach several sermons as a test of his ability. The Washington First Baptist Church voted, without a dissenting vote, to appoint him as their first pastor. The church could not financially support a pastor. So Brown obtained a clerkship in the United States Post Office and eventually held the post of Chief of the Contract Division. He became the fiscal agent representing several Congressmen in Washington during the months they returned to their home states. He and his wife Elizabeth turned their home into a boardinghouse. Brown was the pastor of the First Baptist Church in Washington for more than 40 years.

Brown served as Chaplain of the House (1807–1809 and 1814–1815) and as Chaplain of the Senate (1809–1810).

At the encouragement of President James Monroe, Brown was among a group of Baptist leaders who created the Columbian College, which decades later became the George Washington University. On February 8, 1821, the college was formally chartered by Congress. The college property was in Obadiah Brown's name on the deed. He was the President of the college's board of trustees.

== Personal life ==
Brown married Elizabeth Jackson Reilly. Their four children include Mary Elizabeth Brown, Dr. William Van Horne Brown and Thomas B. Brown.

Brown died on May 2, 1852. For years, Washingtonians still thought of the sanctuary he had built for the second meetinghouse of the First Baptist Church as "Brown's Church"; when the congregation moved, it was renovated to become Ford's Theater. O. B. Brown's body was buried in the Congressional Cemetery; the remains were moved to Oak Hill Cemetery on November 10, 1868.

Religious titles
Preceded by Robert Elliott	8th US House Chaplain; October 30, 1807 – May 27, 1809	Succeeded by Jesse Lee
Preceded by James Jones Wilmer	11th US Senate Chaplain; December 5, 1809 – December 11, 1810	Succeeded by Walter Dulaney Addison
Preceded by Jesse Lee	12th US House Chaplain; September 23, 1814 – December 7, 1815	Succeeded by Spencer Houghton Cone
