= ZeBarney Thorne Phillips =

American clergyman (1875–1942)

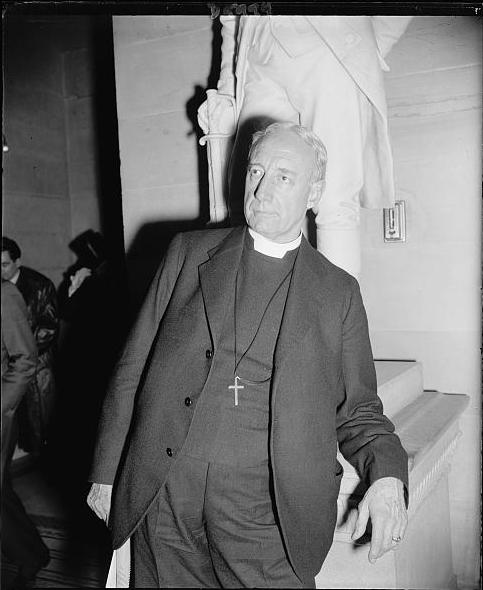
- Rev. ZeBarney Thorne Phillips
- Born: May 1, 1875; Springfield, Ohio, U.S.
- Died: May 10, 1942 (aged 67); Washington, D.C., U.S.
- Burial place: Washington National Cathedral
- Education: Wittenberg College (AB, AM); General Theological Seminary (BD, DD)
- Known for: Chaplain of the Senate
- Spouse: Sallie Hews Winston (m. 1906)
- Children: 2
- Ordained: May 1, 1900

ZeBarney Thorne Phillips (May 1, 1875 – May 10, 1942) was an Episcopal clergyman who served as Chaplain of the Senate (1927–1942).

== Early years ==
ZeBarney Thorne Phillips was born on May 1, 1875, in Springfield, Ohio, to ZeBarney and Sallie Essex Sharp Phillips. The elder Phillips died when his son was four years old. The younger Phillips was educated at Wittenberg College, Springfield, Ohio. He graduated from Wittenberg with a Bachelor of Arts in 1895 and a Master of Arts in 1896. For the next twelve years, his profession was church organist and choirmaster. Then, he became a student at the General Theological Seminary of New York City, graduating in 1899 or 1910, sources differ, with a Bachelor of Divinity and a Doctor of Divinity.

== Ministry ==
On July 9, 1899, he was ordained a deacon of the Episcopal church. Following work at St. Luke's church, Cincinnati, he took charge of St. Mary's church at Hillsboro, Ohio (1899). On May 1, 1900, he was ordained to the priesthood and became rector of St. Mary's church, where he remained until June of the following year. Thereafter, he served these churches in succession: the Church of Our Saviour, Mount Auburn, Cincinnati, Ohio (1900–1903) and Trinity church, Chicago (1903–1909). Following two years of study in Oxford, England, and a year of lecturing in New York, he was called to become the rector of St. Peter's Church, St. Louis, Missouri, in 1919. He remained in St. Louis until 1924. From 1922 to 1924, he joined the Church of the Savior in Philadelphia.

He became rector of the Church of the Epiphany in Washington, D.C. (1924–1942). On December 5, 1927, he was elected Chaplain of the Senate, a post he filled until his death. In 1928, he was elected president of the House of Deputies of the Episcopal Church, described as "a liberal evangelical, is a compromise president... pleasing to the liberal (quasi-Roman) high church & to the evangelical (Methodistic) low church".

He was elected Dean of the Washington National Cathedral on November 26, 1941; he served until his death. During his short tenure as dean, Phillips' professional music training as an organist led directly to the founding of the Cathedral Choral Society, the resident symphonic chorus of the Cathedral.

== Personal life ==
On September 4, 1906, Phillips married Mrs. Sallie Hews Winston, daughter of Edson Lawrence Hews, of New Orleans, Louisiana; their children were Sallie Hews and Faith Phillips.

Phillips died of respiratory failure following hydromorphone use on May 10, 1942, at the Church of the Ephiphany in Washington, D.C. He was cremated and buried at the columbarium of the Chapel of Joseph of Arimathea at the National Cathedral. The Cathedral Choral Society gave their inaugural concert at Phillips's memorial. Their performance was Verdi's Requiem.

Religious titles
Preceded by Joseph Johnston Muir	55th US Senate Chaplain; December 5, 1927 – May 1942	Succeeded by Frederick Brown Harris
