= Henry Van Dyke Johns =

American clergyman (1803–1859)

Henry Van Dyke Johns (1803–1859) was an Episcopal clergyman who served as Chaplain of the Senate.

== Early years ==
Johns was born October 23, 1803, in New Castle County, Delaware, the son of the son of Kensey and Anne (Van Dyke) Johns. His was a prominent political family in New Castle, Delaware. His father was Chief Justice of the state and his grandfather was Governor of Delaware, Nicholas Van Dyke. His older brother John Johns was to become the Episcopal Bishop of Virginia.

== Ministry ==
Johns was confirmed and ordained to the office of deacon in the Episcopal church, in Holy Trinity Church (Old Swedes), Wilmington, Delaware, by William White (Bishop of Pennsylvania), in August, 1827. He became the first rector of Trinity Episcopal Church in Georgetown, D.C. Rev. Johns served as Chaplain of the Senate (1829). In 1832, he moved to Rochester, New York, but returned to Maryland in 1833 to become rector of All Saints Church in Frederick, Maryland, and three years later of Trinity Church in Baltimore, Maryland. In 1837 Rev. Johns served as rector of St. Andrew’s, Baltimore. In 1838 he moved to St. Paul's Church, Cincinnati, Ohio, but again returned to Maryland in 1843 and became rector of Christ Church, Baltimore. Thereafter he served as the first rector of Emmanuel Church, Baltimore.

== Personal life ==
Johns married Lavinia Montgomery in 1827. They were the parents of seven children, Montgomery, Mary Lavinia, Henry Van Dyke, Jr., John Kinsey, Fidelia Rogerson, Lavinia M., and James Carroll Johns. Johns died on April 22, 1859. Ten thousand people attended his funeral on foot. Memorial Episcopal Church, Bolton Hill, Baltimore, Maryland (built between 1861 and 1864 ), is a memorial to Henry Van Dyke Johns; the Marble Pulpit, Communion Table and Reading Desk, now in Memorial Church, are those formerly used in Christ Church during the ministry of Rev. Dr. Johns, and his brother who preceded him and thereafter became Bishop of Virginia.

Religious titles
Preceded by William Ryland	26th US Senate Chaplain; December 14, 1829 – December 19, 1831	Succeeded by John Price Durbin
