= John Reinhard Goodman =

American Episcopal clergyman

John Reinhard Goodman (died July 8, 1865) was an Episcopal clergyman who served as Chaplain of the Senate (1836–1837).

== Early life ==
Goodman was born in Philadelphia. He graduated from the University of Pennsylvania (Bachelor of Arts, 1813, Master of Arts 1817).

== Ministry ==
John R. Goodman became pastor of the Episcopal congregation in Brunswick, New York, in April 1821 and continued there until 1828. He then served as rector of Christ Church, New Bern, North Carolina, from 1828 to 1834 Thereafter, until 1837, he was rector of St. John's Church, Carlisle, Pennsylvania. He served as Chaplain of the Senate (1836–1837). In later years he lived in Philadelphia and remained active in denominational gatherings up until the year of his death. He died in Philadelphia on July 8, 1865.

He was the author of ‘’Pennsylvania Biography, or Memoirs of Eminent Pennsylvanians’’ (1840).

== Personal life ==
Goodman married Julia W (Woodbridge) Rodman, They had three children: Catherine Goodman, Charlotte Goodman and Julia M. Goodman, who married. Byron Pomeroy.

Religious titles
Preceded by Edward Young Higbee	30th US Senate Chaplain; December 28, 1836 – September 11, 1837	Succeeded by Henry Slicer
