= Chaplain of the United States Senate =

Position in the U.S. Senate

Chaplain of United States Senate
- Seal of the United States Senate

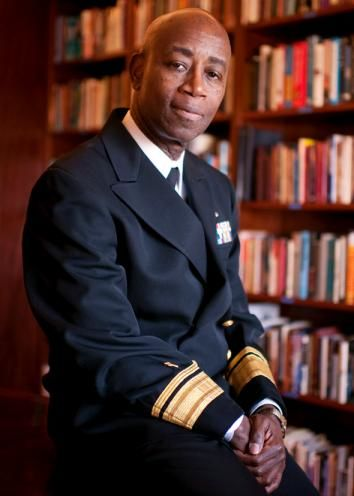
- Incumbent; Barry C. Black since July 7, 2003
- United States Senate
- Type: Chaplain
- Appointer: Elected by the Senate
- Formation: April 25, 1789
- First holder: Samuel Provoost
- Website: Office of the Senate Chaplain, U.S. Senate

The chaplain of the United States Senate opens each session of the United States Senate with a prayer, and provides and coordinates religious programs and pastoral care support for senators, their staffs, and their families. The chaplain is appointed by a majority vote of the members of the Senate on a resolution nominating an individual for the position. The three most recent nominations have been submitted based on a bipartisan search committee although that procedure is not required.

Chaplains are elected as individuals and not as representatives of any religious community, body, or organization. As of 2024, all Senate chaplains have belonged to various denominations of Christianity, though there are no restrictions against members of any religion or faith group. Guest chaplains, recommended by senators to deliver the session's opening prayer in place of the Senate chaplain, have represented "all the world's major religious faiths."

The current chaplain is Barry C. Black, a retired Navy Rear Admiral and former Chief of Navy Chaplains. He is the first Seventh-day Adventist and the first African-American to hold the position.

== Duties ==
The chaplain of the United States Senate is chosen to "perform ceremonial, symbolic, and pastoral duties." These responsibilities include opening Senate sessions with a prayer or coordinating the delivery of the prayer by guest chaplains recommended by members of the Senate. The chaplain's prayer is referred to as "one of the Senate's most enduring traditions" in the official Senate pamphlet "Traditions of the U.S. Senate."

The Senate chaplain is also responsible for "hosting" guest chaplains on the day they deliver prayers. According to the U.S. Senate website, these guest chaplains have represented "many of the world's major religious faiths," and their participation is a sign that the Senate is sensitive to the "increasing religious diversity of the nation."

According to Robert C. Byrd in his book The Senate: 1789-1989, "The Duties that chaplains perform...are not all written down, but they are numerous and have evolved over the centuries." His description continues:

"The Chaplain visits senators when they go to the hospital, represents the Senate in appearances before church groups across the nation, and is host to visiting religious figures who come to the Capitol. On occasion, chaplains of the Senate have led groups of saffron-robed Tibetan monks on tours of the building."

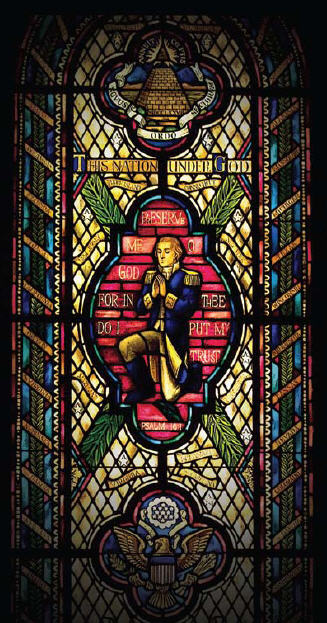
Stained glass window of George Washington in prayer, Capitol Prayer Room

The chaplain also provides pastoral care for the senators, their staffs, and their families, and provides or oversees religious programs such as Bible study, reflection groups, and the weekly Senate Prayer Breakfast. The chaplain also often presides over religious ceremonies such as funerals and memorial services for current or past members and participates, offering delivering the invocation or benediction, at many official U.S. ceremonies, including White House events. For example, Chaplain Barry Black delivered the keynote address at the National Prayer Breakfast held February 2, 2017 before President Trump and previously at the "inaugural prayer breakfast" and the benediction at the "inaugural luncheon" for President Barack Obama. In a January 2011 post on "On Watch in Washington," the chaplain of the Senate as well as the chaplain of the United States House of Representatives were included as part of "Obama's Spiritual Cabinet."

Along with the House chaplain, the Senate chaplain is responsible for overseeing the Capitol Prayer Room, located near the Capitol Rotunda. Dedicated in 1955, there are no worship services held in the room, nor is it normally open to the public. Instead, as described by Sam Rayburn during the room's dedication, it is a place for members "who want to be alone with their God."

The Senate chaplain has a staff that includes a Chief-of-Staff, Director of Communications, and Executive Assistant, and works with a volunteer liaison in each Senate office. While the annual salary for the first Senate chaplains was $500, the salary is now set as a Level IV position in the Executive Schedule, which is $155,500.00 in 2011. The total annual budget for the office, including salaries and expenses, is $415,000 as of 2011.

Guest chaplains have been selected to deliver occasional prayers to open Senate sessions "for many decades." In 1948 Wilmina Rowland Smith became the first female guest chaplain to deliver the opening prayer, in 1992 Warith Deen Mohammed was the first Muslim, in 2007 Rajan Zed was the first Hindu, and in 2014 Tenzin Gyatso, the 14th Dalai Lama was the first Buddhist. Senators are limited regarding the number of recommendations they can make regarding guest chaplains (in the House of Representatives, members are limited to one recommendation per Congress), and although there was originally no limit to the number of times per month a guest chaplain could deliver the prayer in the place of the Senate chaplain, that number is now limited to two.

=== Opening prayer ===
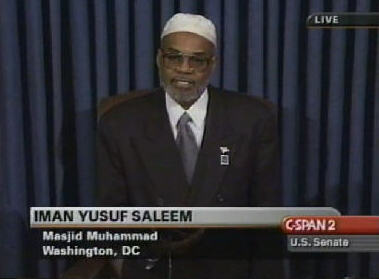
Imam Yusuf Saleem delivers opening prayer as Guest Chaplain, October 24, 2001

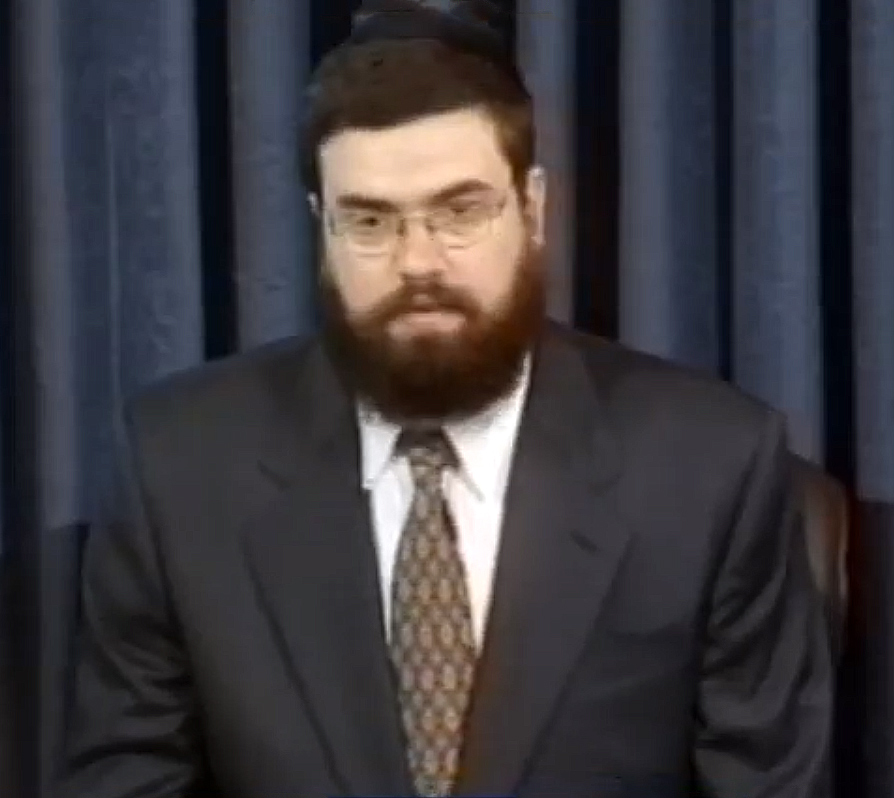
Rabbi Levi Shemtov delivers opening prayer as Guest Chaplain, September 17, 1998

The inclusion of a prayer before the opening of each session of both the House and the Senate, traces its origins back to the days of the Continental Congress, and the official recommendation of Benjamin Franklin, June 28, 1787:

“I have lived, Sir, a long time, and the longer I live, the more convincing proofs I see of this truth: that God Governs in the affairs of men. And if a sparrow cannot fall to the ground without his notice, is it probable that an empire can rise without his aid?

We have been assured, Sir, in the sacred writings, that ‘except the Lord build the House they labour in vain that build it.’ I firmly believe this; and I also believe that without his concurring aid we shall succeed in this political building no better, than the Builders of Babel . . .

I therefore beg leave to move— that henceforth prayers imploring the assistance of Heaven, and its blessings on our deliberations, be held in this Assembly every morning before we proceed to business, and that one or more of the Clergy of this City be requested to officiate in that Service.”

== History ==
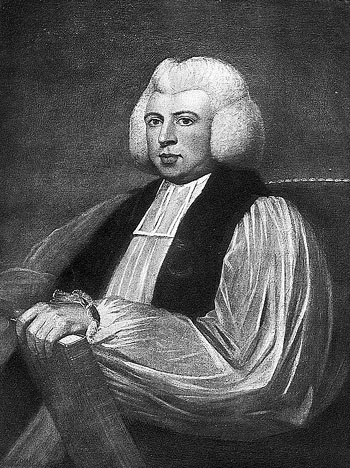
The Right Reverend Samuel Provoost, first chaplain of the United States Senate

Shortly after the Senate first convened in April 1789 in New York City, one of its "first orders of business" was to convene a committee to recommend a chaplain, selecting the Right Reverend Samuel Provoost, Episcopal Bishop of New York. When the Senate moved to Philadelphia the next year, the Right Reverend William White, that city's Episcopal bishop was selected. In 1800, when the Senate relocated to Washington, D.C., clergymen from various Christian denominations ("mainline Protestant denominations--usually Episcopalians or Presbyterians") continued to be selected, delivering prayers and presiding at funerals and memorial services.

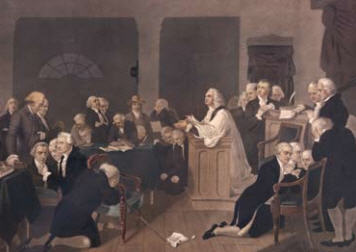
The Rev. Jacob Duche leads the first prayer before the Continental Congress, Philadelphia, September 7, 1774

During this early period, chaplains "typically served" for less than a year while concurrently serving in non-congressional positions. Also, early Senate and House chaplains, although elected separately by their respected chambers, shared Congressional responsibilities by alternating service in the House and Senate on a weekly basis, also conducting Sunday worship for the Washington, D.C. community in the House Chamber on an alternating basis. Clergymen have served in the official position of Senate Chaplain for all years since the office was created except for the brief period of 1857-1859. In 1914, the Senate began adding the chaplain's prayer to the Congressional Record.

In 1970 New Jersey Senator Harrison A. Williams "reminded his colleagues of James Madison's strong objection when the post was created in 1793", and "noted the modern fulfillment of another of Madison's warnings, that there would inevitably be discrimination in the appointment of such a chaplain against the (then) smaller denominations such as Catholics and Jews." Williams pointed out "that although Catholics have for some time comprised the largest single religious affiliation in both the Senate and the population as a whole, there has been only one Roman Catholic Senate chaplain since 1793, and not a single rabbi." He noted "Only eight denominations have been represented in the office."

In light of this, Williams put forward Senate Resolution 90 which "resulted in the Senate's decision to appoint a new chaplain annually, rather than let the incumbent serve for life." The appointment would also "rotate among the nation's three major religious groups." When asked by reporters about the question of Constitutionality raised by his citing Madison he replied "If this were tested, I would say that it could go either way. It could be declared unconstitutional. Any taxpayer could question this, but no one ever has."

He held that in places where people were isolated by acts of government, such as people in the armed services, hospitals or prisons that chaplains serving them would be Constitutional, "But, I don't know anybody less isolated than members of Congress." In following eras the courts would rule on the constitutionality of the chaplaincy.

The chaplain of the United States Senate became a full-time position in the middle of the 20th century.

According to a Senate Historical Office review of the records concerning guest chaplains, it was in 1965 that James Kirkland became the first African-American to open the Senate with prayer. In 1971 Wilmina Rowland became the first woman to do so. Wallace Mohammed was the first Muslim to do so in 1992, and Rajan Zed was the first Hindu to say the opening prayer for the Senate in 2007. Tenzin Gyatso, the 14th Dalai Lama became the first Buddhist to lead the Senate in prayer, and as of 2014 was the highest religious official to do so.

== Selection ==
Unlike the chaplain of the United States House of Representatives, who must be elected to a two-year term at "the beginning of each Congress," the Senate chaplain (like other Senate officers) does not have to be reelected. Both the House and Senate chaplains are elected as individuals, "not as representatives of any religious body or denominational entity."

When a vacancy occurs, the Senate chooses a new chaplain through a vote on the adoption of a resolution. According to a 2011 Congressional Research Service congressional report, "The three most recent Senate candidates for chaplain have been nominated by a bipartisan search committee that examined possible applicants. This method has not always been Senate practice and may differ from any future nomination." Ultimately, it is the "leadership" of the Senate that can decide on what names can be put forth as nominations.

The report also notes that "The post of chaplain to the Senate has generally not been subject to party considerations."

== Constitutionality ==
The question of the constitutionality of the position of the Senate chaplain (as well as that of the House chaplain, and at times, that of military chaplains as well), has been a subject of study and debate over the centuries. Opponents have argued that it violates the separation of church-and-state and proponents have argued, among other factors, that the same early legislators who wrote the United States Constitution and its Bill of Rights, from which the position of "non-establishment" and church and state separation is derived, were the same ones who approved and appointed the chaplains.

President James Madison was an example of a leader who ultimately came to think that the positions of Senate and House chaplains could not be constitutionally supported, although whether he always held this view (and to what extent he believed it at various times during his life) is a subject of debate. However it is clear from his "Detached Memoranda" writings during his retirement that he had come to believe the positions could not be justified:

Is the appointment of Chaplains to the two Houses of Congress consistent with the Constitution, and with the pure principle of religious freedom?

In strictness the answer on both points must be in the negative. The Constitution of the U.S. forbids everything like an establishment of a national religion. The law appointing Chaplains establishes a religious worship for the national representatives, to be performed by Ministers of religion, elected by a majority of them; and these are to be paid out of the national taxes. Does not this involve the principle of a national establishment, applicable to a provision for a religious worship for the Constituent as well as of the representative Body, approved by the majority, and conducted by Ministers of religion paid by the entire nation.

The establishment of the chaplainship to Congress is a palpable violation of equal rights, as well as of Constitutional principles: The tenets of the chaplains elected [by the majority] shut the door of worship agst the members whose creeds & consciences forbid a participation in that of the majority. To say nothing of other sects, this is the case with that of Roman Catholics & Quakers who have always had members in one or both of the Legislative branches. Could a Catholic clergyman ever hope to be appointed a Chaplain? To say that his religious principles are obnoxious or that his sect is small, is to lift the evil at once and exhibit in its naked deformity the doctrine that religious truth is to be tested by numbers, or that the major sects have a right to govern the minor.

The constitutionality question has been examined in a number of court cases. According to "House and Senate Chaplains: An Overview," an official 2011 CRS report created by the Congressional Research Service for "Members and Committees of Congress":

The constitutionality of legislative chaplains was upheld in 1983 by the Supreme Court (Marsh v. Chambers, 463 U.S. 783, related to chaplains in the Nebraska Legislature) on the grounds of precedent and tradition. The Court cited the practice going back to the Continental Congress in 1774 and noted that the custom "is deeply embedded in the history and tradition of this country" from colonial times and the founding of the republic. Further, the Court held that the use of prayer "has become part of the fabric of our society," coexisting with "the principles of disestablishment and religious freedom." This decision was cited in Murray v. Buchanan, which challenged the House chaplaincy, the next year. On appeal, the U.S. Court of Appeals for the District of Columbia dismissed the complaint "for want of a substantial constitutional question." Subsequently, on March 25, 2004, the U.S. District Court for the District of Columbia, citing Marsh v. Chambers, dismissed a suit that challenged the congressional practice of paid chaplains as well as the practice of opening legislative sessions with prayer.

In 2000, a C-SPAN "public affairs on the web" response to the question of constitutional challenges noted that:

In 1983, the Supreme Court upheld the practice of having an official chaplain as deeply ingrained in the history and tradition of this country. They stated the ultimate authority for the position lies in the Constitution which states that the House and Senate may each choose their officers, with no restrictions on what kind of officers may be chosen. Using that authority, both chambers have chosen to continue to elect an officer to act as Chaplain.

== Controversies ==
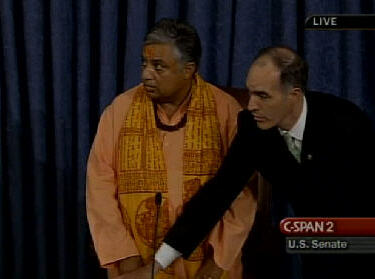
The Presiding Officer of the Senate directs that "The Sergeant-at-Arms will restore order in the Senate" when a group of Christian protestors interrupt Guest Chaplain Rajan Zed, the first Senate Hindu guest chaplain, July 12, 2007

In addition to court cases, controversy regarding the chaplain's position included a number of petitions to abolish both the Senate and House chaplains that were submitted as early as the 1850s, for reasons including claims that the positions represented a violation of the separation of church and state and that the choice of chaplains had become too politicized. From 1855-1861, the election of chaplains for the House and from 1857-1859, the election of chaplains for the Senate were suspended, with local clergy invited to serve on a voluntary basis, instead. However, as a result of "the difficulty in obtaining volunteer chaplains" and the opportunity for volunteer chaplains to get to know "their flock," Congress returned to the practice of selecting official chaplains for both the House and the Senate.

There have also been occasions when actions or decisions of individuals serving in the position have created controversy. For example, in 2007 Senate Chaplain Barry C. Black canceled his scheduled appearance at the "Evangelical conference" "Reclaiming America for Christ." According to news reports, "Black reconsidered his appearance after "Americans United for Separation of Church and State" objected. Black announced he had reconsidered his participation because it would not be appropriate considering the Senate chaplain's "historic tradition of being nonpolitical, nonpartisan, nonsectarian." Black said that he had received a "very generic invitation" to speak, and felt that the information about the event had been "incomplete."

In 1984, Dr. Paul Kurtz, "a professor of philosophy and advocate of secular humanism," sued the government in a case that reached the United States Supreme Court for the right to offer comments in place of the prayer that would normally be delivered by the Senate chaplain or guest chaplain. The Court denied his suit on the grounds that no individual has the "right" to address Congress, and that the delivery of the prayer, coordinated by the Senate chaplain, was governed by policies that dealt with "prayers" (not "remarks") which Kurtz did not seem prepared to offer.

In 2007, the prayer delivered by Rajan Zed, the first Hindu guest chaplain was briefly interrupted by protestors described by news reports as members of the Christian Right. Activists had organized supporters to lobby Congress to stop the delivery of the prayer and failing that action to interrupt the prayer itself. The protestors were removed by the United States Capitol Police, charged with disrupting Congress, and barred from the Capitol and its grounds for twelve months.

== Current chaplain ==
The current chaplain, the 62nd chaplain of the United States Senate, Barry C. Black, is the first African-American and the first Seventh-day Adventist to serve in the position. He previously served as Chief of Chaplains of the United States Navy, holding the rank of Rear Admiral. Although some news reports note that Black is the "first military chaplain" to serve as Senate Chaplain, the Rev. Edward L. R. Elson, the 59th chaplain of the United States Senate, served as an Army chaplain during World War II. Black has the longest consecutive tenure among senate chaplains.

== List of Senate chaplains ==
The website for the U.S. Senate includes the following list of past and present Senate chaplains:

No.	Chaplain	Photo	Religion	Denomination	Appointed
1	Samuel Provoost		Christian	Episcopal	April 25, 1789
2	William White		Christian	Episcopal	December 9, 1790
3	Thomas John Claggett		Christian	Episcopal	November 27, 1800
4	Edward Gantt		Christian	Episcopal	December 9, 1801
5	A. T. McCormick		Christian	Episcopal	November 7, 1804
6	Edward Gantt		Christian	Episcopal	December 4, 1805
7	John Johnson Sayrs		Christian	Episcopal	December 3, 1806
8	A. T. McCormick		Christian	Episcopal	November 10, 1807
9	Robert Elliott		Christian	Presbyterian	November 10, 1808
10	James Jones Wilmer		Christian	Episcopal	May 24, 1809
11	Obadiah Bruen Brown		Christian	Baptist	December 5, 1809
12	Walter Dulaney Addison		Christian	Episcopal	December 12, 1810
13	John Brackenridge, D.D.		Christian	Presbyterian	November 13, 1811
14	Jesse Lee		Christian	Methodist	September 27, 1814
15	John Glendy		Christian	Presbyterian	December 8, 1815
16	Sereno Edwards Dwight		Christian	Congregationalist	December 16, 1816
17	William Dickinson Hawley		Christian	Episcopal	December 9, 1817
18	John Clark		Christian	Presbyterian	November 19, 1818
19	Reuben Post		Christian	Presbyterian	December 9, 1819
20	William Ryland		Christian	Methodist	November 17, 1820
21	Charles Pettit McIlvaine		Christian	Episcopal	December 9, 1822
22	William Staughton		Christian	Baptist	December 10, 1823
23	Charles Pettit McIlvaine		Christian	Episcopal	December 14, 1824
24	William Staughton		Christian	Baptist	December 12, 1825
25	William Ryland		Christian	Methodist	December 8, 1826
26	Henry Van Dyke Johns		Christian	Episcopal	December 14, 1829
27	John Price Durbin		Christian	Methodist	December 19, 1831
28	Charles Constantine Pise		Christian	Roman Catholic	December 11, 1832
29	Frederick Winslow Hatch		Christian	Episcopal	December 10, 1833
30	Edward Young Higbee		Christian	Episcopal	December 23, 1835
31	John Reinhard Goodman		Christian	Episcopal	December 28, 1836
32	Henry Slicer		Christian	Methodist	September 11, 1837
33	George Grimston Cookman		Christian	Methodist	December 31, 1839
34	Septimus Tustin		Christian	Presbyterian	June 12, 1841
35	Henry Slicer		Christian	Methodist	December 16, 1846
36	Clement Moore Butler		Christian	Episcopal	January 9, 1850
37	Henry Slicer		Christian	Methodist	December 7, 1853
38	Henry Clay Dean		Christian	Methodist	December 4, 1855
39	Stephen P. Hill		Christian	Baptist	December 8, 1856
40	Phineas Densmore Gurley		Christian	Presbyterian	December 15, 1859
41	Byron Sunderland		Christian	Presbyterian	July 10, 1861
42	Thomas Bowman		Christian	Methodist	May 11, 1864
43	Edgar Harkness Gray		Christian	Baptist	March 9, 1865
44	John Philip Newman		Christian	Methodist	March 8, 1869
45	Byron Sunderland		Christian	Presbyterian	December 8, 1873
46	Joseph J. Bullock		Christian	Presbyterian	March 24, 1879
47	Elias DeWitt Huntley		Christian	Methodist	December 18, 1883
48	John George Butler		Christian	Lutheran	March 15, 1886
49	William Henry Milburn		Christian	Methodist	April 6, 1893
50	F.J. Prettyman		Christian	Methodist	November 23, 1903
51	Edward Everett Hale		Christian	Unitarian	December 14, 1903
52	Ulysses Grant Baker Pierce		Christian	Unitarian	June 18, 1909
53	F.J. Prettyman		Christian	Methodist	March 13, 1913
54	Joseph Johnston Muir		Christian	Baptist	January 21, 1921
55	ZeBarney Thorne Phillips		Christian	Episcopal	December 5, 1927
56	Frederick Brown Harris		Christian	Methodist	October 10, 1942
57	Peter Marshall		Christian	Presbyterian	January 4, 1947
58	Frederick Brown Harris		Christian	Methodist	February 3, 1949
59	Edward L.R. Elson		Christian	Presbyterian	January 9, 1969
60	Richard C. Halverson		Christian	Presbyterian	February 2, 1981
61	Lloyd John Ogilvie		Christian	Presbyterian	March 11, 1995
62	Barry C. Black		Christian	Seventh-day Adventist	July 7, 2003

== Demographics ==
The U.S. Senate website focusing on the history of Senate chaplains includes the following information on the religious backgrounds of past and current Senate chaplains:

Episcopalian	19
Methodist	17
Presbyterian	14
Baptist	6
Unitarian	2
Congregationalist	1
Lutheran	1
Roman Catholic	1
Seventh-day Adventist	1
Total	62

Of these, three of the Episcopalians served two terms; three of the Methodists served twice and one thrice; and one each of the Presbyterians and Baptists served twice.

== See also ==
- Chaplain of the United States House of Representatives
