= Christy: Return to Cutter Gap =

- Based on: Christy by Catherine Marshall
- Screenplay by: Tom Blomquist
- Directed by: Chuck Bowman
- Starring: Lauren Lee Smith; Stewart Finlay-McLennan; James Waterston; Diane Ladd; Emily Perkins

Production
- Running time: 89 minutes

Original release
- Network: Pax TV
- Release: November 19, 2000

Related
- Christy; Christy, Choices of the Heart

Christy: Return to Cutter Gap (originally aired under the title Christy: The Movie) is a 2000 American drama television film directed by Chuck Bowman, starring Lauren Lee Smith, Stewart Finlay-McLennan, James Waterston, Diane Ladd, Dale Dickey, Andy Stahl, Bruce McKinnon, and Claudette Mink. The film aired on Pax TV on November 19, 2000.

== Plot ==
Set in early-20th-century Tennessee, this film tells the story of schoolteacher Christy Huddleston who attempts to force a small community into progressing with the outside world. Considered an outsider by the residents of Cutter Gap, North Carolina native Christy is beloved as a teacher but has begun to stir up conflict with her pleas for progress and stories of an outside world of skyscrapers and modern conveniences. When an aviatrix crash lands in Cutter Gap, the attention is taken off Christy, until a series of robberies occur. Believing the thieves would never have come if it weren't for the new road Christy had built, the town unites against her. Faced with this series of setbacks, Christy contemplates returning home to North Carolina, but is persuaded to stay.

== Production ==
Based on Catherine Marshall's novel Christy and the follow-up of the TV series Christy, this Pax television adaptation features Lauren Lee Smith as the 19-year-old schoolteacher who flounders and perseveres in an isolated mountain community in the early 20th century. Set against the backdrop of Tennessee's Great Smoky Mountains, this film begins with an elderly Christy (played by Sheila Moore) returning to the long-abandoned mission where she once taught. Claudette Mink appears as a fictional version of pioneering pilot Harriet Quimby.

It premiered on the Pax television network in the United States on November 19, 2000.

Developed for television by executive producer Tom Blomquist the film was the first of three Christy films to continue and resolve the storylines presented in the original CBS series and the novel. Return to Cutter Gap re-established the themes and characters of the previous Christy productions for longtime fans and newcomers, alike.

== DVD release ==
The release of the DVD set for the Christy series of television movies for Region 1 was August 28, 2001.
