= Christy, Choices of the Heart =

- Written by: Catherine Marshall
- Directed by: George Kaczender; Don McBrearty
- Starring: Lauren Lee Smith; Stewart Finlay-McLennan; James Waterston; Diane Ladd; Emily Perkins
- Music by: Ron Ramin
- Country of origin: United States
- Original language: English
- No. of episodes: 2

Production
- Executive producer: Tom Blomquist
- Cinematography: Laszlo George
- Editor: Roger Mattiussi

Original release
- Network: Pax TV
- Release: May 13 – May 14, 2001

Related
- Christy: The Movie

Christy, Choices of the Heart is a 2001 American two-part television miniseries starring Lauren Lee Smith, Stewart Finlay-McLennan, James Waterston, Diane Ladd, Dale Dickey, Andy Stahl, and Bruce McKinnon. Individually, the first part is known as Christy: A Change of Seasons and the second part is known as Christy: A New Beginning. The miniseries was developed for television by executive producer Tom Blomquist, and aired on the Pax TV on May 13–14, 2001.

The storyline was an adaptation of a section of the Christy novel that was not presented in the original CBS television series – the typhoid fever epidemic that took the life of a popular character, Fairlight Spencer.
