= Randall Batinkoff =

American actor

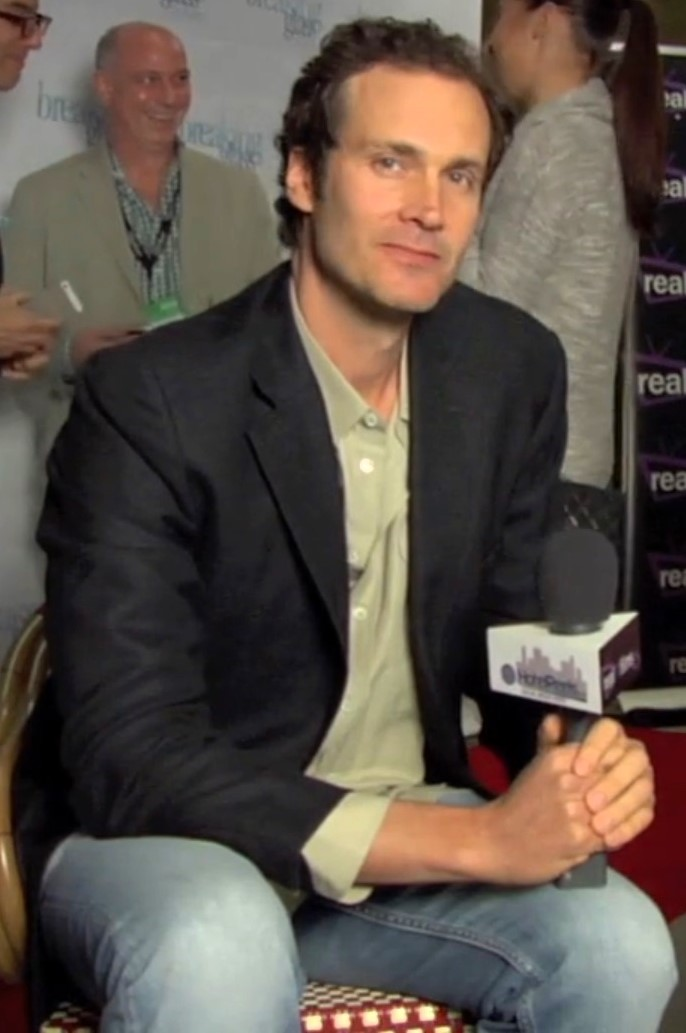
- Batinkoff in 2014
- Born: Randall Matthew Batinkoff; October 16, 1968 (age 57); Monticello, New York, U.S.
- Occupations: Film, stage, television
- Years active: 1974–present
- Spouse: Hilary Lambert (wife)
- Children: Isabel Lambert Batinkoff (daughter)
- Parents: Bruce Winston (father); Barbara Winston (mother)
- Relatives: Stephanie Winston Wolkoff (sister); Harry Winston (grandfather)

Randall Matthew Batinkoff (born October 16, 1968) is an American actor. He began his career in commercials at the age of eight before transitioning to film and television. He gained recognition for his role opposite Molly Ringwald in the 1988 drama For Keeps. Throughout the 1990s, he appeared in notable films such as The Player, Buffy the Vampire Slayer, School Ties, The Peacemaker, and As Good as It Gets. On television, he starred as Reverend David Grantland in the CBS series Christy.

In 2013, Batinkoff made his directorial debut with 37: A Final Promise, a psychological drama that he also co-wrote and starred in. He has produced and appeared in the Nicolas Cage film, Gunslingers. Throughout his career, Batinkoff has taken on various roles in the entertainment industry, contributing as an actor, director, writer, and producer in both independent and mainstream cinema.

== Personal life and education ==
Batinkoff was born in Monticello, New York, the son of Barbara Winston. His family is Jewish. His sister is event planner Stephanie Winston Wolkoff. His step-father, Bruce Winston, is the son of world renowned jeweler Harry Winston. Batinkoff attended Phillips Academy in Andover, Massachusetts, for his high school education. After graduating Brown University and receiving a Bachelor of Arts in international relations, Batinkoff moved to Los Angeles, California, where he met his wife, Hilary Lambert; also a Brown University graduate. In 2010, the two welcomed their daughter, Isabel Batinkoff. Batinkoff now resides in New York City, and is actively acting, producing, and directing.

== Career ==
Randall Batinkoff began his career in the entertainment industry at the age of eight, starring in various commercials before making the transition to film and television. His early experience in front of the camera provided him with a strong foundation in acting, leading to significant opportunities in both film and television throughout his career.

Batinkoff's breakout film role came in 1988 when he starred opposite Molly Ringwald in the coming-of-age drama For Keeps. In the film, he played Stan Bobrucz, a high school student navigating the complexities of teenage pregnancy and responsibility. The film showcased Batinkoff's ability to bring emotional depth to his roles and helped establish him as a rising young actor in Hollywood. His performance, along with his charm and on-screen presence, cemented his status as a teenage heartthrob of the late 1980s.

Throughout the 1990s, Batinkoff continued to build his filmography with a series of notable performances. In 1992, he appeared in The Player, a satirical drama directed by Robert Altman that explored the inner workings of Hollywood. The same year, he had roles in Buffy the Vampire Slayer, the original film that inspired the popular television series, and School Ties, a drama set in the 1950s that tackled themes of antisemitism and social class at a prestigious prep school. His performance in School Ties placed him alongside future stars such as Matt Damon, Ben Affleck, and Brendan Fraser.

Batinkoff's work continued into the late 1990s with roles in high-profile films. In 1997, he appeared in The Peacemaker, an action thriller starring George Clooney and Nicole Kidman. That same year, he had a supporting role in As Good as It Gets, the Academy Award-winning romantic comedy-drama starring Jack Nicholson and Helen Hunt, sharing an on-screen kiss with Hunt. The film received critical acclaim, and Batinkoff's involvement further solidified his presence in major Hollywood productions.

In addition to his work in film, Batinkoff took on a significant television role in Christy, a CBS drama series that aired from 1994 to 1995. Based on the novel by Catherine Marshall, Christy followed the journey of a young woman teaching in an Appalachian village. Batinkoff played Reverend David Grantland, a key character in the story's central love triangle. His performance in the series demonstrated his versatility as an actor and his ability to bring depth to period dramas.

After years of working in front of the camera, Batinkoff expanded his career into directing. In 2013, he made his directorial debut with 37: A Final Promise, a psychological drama that he also co-wrote and starred in. The film follows a rock star who has planned his own death but finds his outlook changed when he falls in love. This project marked an important milestone in Batinkoff's career, showcasing his talents beyond acting and proving his capability as a filmmaker.

== Filmography ==
=== Film ===
Year	Title	Role	Notes
1985	Streetwalkin'	Tim	
1988	For Keeps	Stan Bobrucz	
1992	The Player	Reg Goldman	
1992	Buffy the Vampire Slayer	Jeffrey	
1992	School Ties	Rip Van Kelt	
1995	Higher Learning	Chad Shadowhill	
1996	Walking and Talking	Peter	
1997	The Peacemaker	Ken	
1997	Mad City	CTN Junior Executive	
1997	As Good as It Gets	Carol's Date	
1998	The Curve	Rand	
1998	Heartwood	Johnny Purfitt	
1999	Let the Devil Wear Black	Bradbury	
1999	The Last Marshal	Jamie	
2000	Just Sue Me	Gardner	
2000	Forever Lulu	Terry Cowens	
2001	Free	Lawrence	
2002	The Month of August	Sam	
2003	Detonator	Beau Stoddard	
2003	I Love Your Work	Frat Brat Date Rapist	
2003	April's Shower	Pauly	
2004	Blue Demon	Nathan Collins	Direct-to-video
2005	Walking on the Sky	Nick	
2005	Touched	Scott Davis	
2005	Venice Underground	Sgt. Frank Mills	
2006	Ring Around the Rosie	Jeff	Direct-to-video
2006	Love Hollywood Style	Max Sherman	
2006	Broken	Cliff	
2007	Bordertown	Frank Kozerski	
2007	True Love	Jim	
2008	The Last Lullaby	Rick	
2010	Kick-Ass	Tre Fernandez	
2010	Raspberry Magic	Dylan	
2011	X-Men: First Class	Man In Black Suit Agent	
2011	Munger Road	Deputy Hendricks	
2011	Ties That Bind	Dan Dubick	
2012	Shadow Witness	Ty Saunders	
2014	37: A Final Promise	Adam	Also director
2016	Who Gets the Dog?	Glenn Hannon	
2017	Bad Grandmas	Detective Randall Mclemore	
2017	DriverX	Ryan	
2020	Angie: Lost Girls	Dan	
2020	The Last Champion	Bobby Baker	
2023	Dead Man's Hand	Winters	
2025	Gunslingers	Doc	Also producer

=== Television ===
Year	Title	Role	Notes
1986	Better Days	Terence Dean	11 episodes
1987	The Stepford Children	David Harding	Television film
1994–1995	Christy	Rev. David Grantland	20 episodes
1996–1997	Relativity	Everett	6 episodes
1999	Hefner: Unauthorized	Hugh Hefner	Television film
2000	Touched by an Angel	Calvin Chilcutt	Episode: "Finger of God"
2002	Son of the Beach	Guido Greasy	Episode: "Saturday Night Queefer"
2003	She Spies	James Green	Episode: "Learning to Fly"
2004	CSI: Miami	Ken Dawson	Episode: "Rap Sheet"
2007	Dirt	Jimmy Rembar	Episode: "The Thing Under the Bed"
2008	Black Widow	Danny Keegan	Television film
2008	Skip Tracer	Scott Colbert	Television film
2010	Castle	Brad Williams	Episode: "Nikki Heat"
2012	Touch	Patrick McGrath	Episode: "1+1=3"
2014	Mind Games	Jonah	Episode: "Pet Rock"
2015	Allegiance	Steven Gallagher	Episode: "Chasing Ghosts"
2017	Legends of Tomorrow	George Washington	2 episodes
TBA	Head Trip	Randal	Post-production

=== Video games ===
Year	Title	Role	Notes
2010	Kick-Ass: The Game	Kick-Ass / Big Daddy / Red Mist	
