= Divided Loyalties =

Divided Loyalties may refer to:

- Divided Loyalties (film), a 1990 Canadian television film
- "Divided Loyalties" (Babylon 5), a 1995 television episode
- "Divided Loyalties" (Mutant X), a 2004 television episode
- Divided Loyalties (novel), a 1999 novel in the Doctor Who franchise
