= Christy (TV series) =

American period drama series

- Based on: Christy by Catherine Marshall
- Developed by: Patricia Green
- Starring: Kellie Martin; Tyne Daly; Randall Batinkoff; Stewart Finlay-McLennan
- Composer: Ron Ramin
- Country of origin: United States
- Original language: English
- No. of seasons: 2
- No. of episodes: 21; 3 Television movies

Production
- Running time: 60 minutes
- Production companies: The Rosenzweig Company; MTM Enterprises

Original release
- Network: CBS
- Release: April 3, 1994 – August 2, 1995

Christy is an American period drama series that aired on CBS from April 1994 to August 1995 for 20 episodes.

Christy was based on the 1967 novel Christy by Catherine Marshall, the widow of Senate chaplain Peter Marshall. Inspired by the experiences of the author's mother, the novel was a bestseller in 1968, and the week following the debut of the TV movie and program, the novel jumped from number 120 up to number 15 on the USA Today bestseller list. Series regular Tyne Daly won an Emmy Award for her work on the series.

== Cast ==
Primary Cast

- Kellie Martin as Christy Huddleston
- Randall Batinkoff as Reverend David Grantland
- Stewart Finlay-McLennan as Dr. Neil MacNeill
- Tyne Daly as Alice Henderson
- Emily Schulman as Ruby Mae Morrison
- Tess Harper as Fairlight Spencer
- LeVar Burton as Daniel Scott (Season 2)

Secondary Cast

- Scott Michael Campbell as Lundy Taylor, the school bully
- Judy Collins as Aunt Hattie McCabe, folk singer
- Dale Dickey as Opal McHone
- Mike Hickman as Bird's Eye Taylor, Lundy's abusive father
- Richard Kiley as Dr. Jacob Ferrand, the mission director
- Scott Latham as Festus Allen
- Bruce McKinnon as Jeb Spencer, Fairlight's husband
- Chelcie Ross as Ben Pentland, who delivers mail to the community
- Sally Smithwick as Bessie Coburn
- Andy Stahl as Tom McHone, Opal's husband
- Sam Tyler Wayman as John Spencer, Fairlight's son
- Collin Wilcox as Swannie O'Teale

== Storyline and characters ==
The show starred Kellie Martin as Christy Huddleston, a new teacher arriving in the fictional Appalachian village of Cutter Gap, Tennessee, in 1912. The villagers have old-fashioned ways. For example, they maintain rules and vengeance similar to the Highland clans of old Scotland. They also have a strong belief in folk medicine. At the same time, many of their ways are portrayed in an idealized fashion. The show emphasized their culture by making Christy and most of the main cast to be outsiders in one fashion or another. These "outsiders" included a minister, David Grantland, played by Randall Batinkoff; Quaker missionary woman Alice Henderson, played by Tyne Daly; and physician, Dr. Neil MacNeill (played by Stuart Finlay McLennan), who while born and raised in Cutter Gap, also grew up and was educated outside of the Appalachia. The television show maintained the book's romance novel element by showing Christy drawn both to the minister and the doctor.

The show's last episode was a cliffhanger concerning Christy's fate in the town and with the two rival male love interests. Later TV movies resolved the love triangle according to the ending of the novel.

Christy was developed for television by Emmy Award-winning writer Patricia Green. Executive producer Ken Wales used his life savings and mortgaged his home to buy the rights to produce the TV series.

== Reception and cancellation ==
The show received mixed reviews from critics. Writing for the Washington Post, Tom Shales said: "It is earnest, well intentioned, based on a beloved book by Catherine Marshall, handsomely photographed, wholesome as a tea cozy, cute as a kitten, and almost unspeakably humdrum." He criticized the performances of Martin and Batinkoff.

John J. O’Connor of the New York Times was more positive. "This is an impressive production," he wrote. "The cast is generally quite good; Ms. Martin is extraordinary, making Christy's fresh-faced innocence utterly captivating on these beautiful and sometimes dangerous mountains." Howard Rosenberg of the Los Angeles Times called it "highly appealing" and "too nice to pick apart."

The series developed a loyal following among readers of the novel and families. It was an initial ratings success, with the pilot episode placing fifth in the weekly Nielsen ratings and inspiring hundreds of letters to CBS from grateful viewers, but it later faltered, as it came on in a period of two years where CBS lost strong affiliates to Fox due to NFL football rights and issues with CBS that had built up years before. Episodes were also expensive to produce, with each installment costing $1.2 million despite generating advertising revenues of only $900,000, in part because it performed poorly among young urban viewers most highly sought by advertisers. The series was cancelled by the network to make way for an attempt to program for younger audiences, but the show's fanbase remained strong despite the cancellation.

== Episodes ==
=== Season 1 (1994) ===
| No. overall | No. in season | Title | Directed by | Written by | Original release date |
|---|---|---|---|---|---|
| 1 | 1 | "Pilot" | Michael Rhodes | Patricia Green | April 3, 1994 |
| 2 | 2 | "Pilot" | Michael Rhodes | Patricia Green | April 3, 1994 |
Nineteen-year-old Christy Huddleston leaves her home to be a school teacher for a mission in the fictional village of Cutter Gap in the Appalachian mountains of Tennessee. She soon learns how hard life is in the poverty-stricken community.
| 3 | 3 | "Lost and Found" | Michael Rhodes | Pamela K. Long | April 7, 1994 |
Christy wishes to start a hygiene program with the help of Dr. MacNeill. Rev. David Grantland tries to woo Christy and is seen by a parent. Rob, a student at the school, is upset when his father wants him to leave school to work with him. While he is walking in the woods, Little Burl follows him and gets lost.
| 4 | 4 | "Both Your Houses" | Michael Rhodes | Patricia Green | April 14, 1994 |
Christy is upset when Opal’s baby dies from ignorance. The feud between the Taylors and the Allens worsens. The children practice the play Romeo and Juliet. Christy hopes that the play will teach the children about the consequences of feuds.
| 5 | 5 | "A Closer Walk" | Michael Rhodes | Dawn Prestwich and Nicole Yorkin | April 21, 1994 |
David tries to fix up the school with the help of volunteers but pushes some of them a little too far. Christy teaches Fairlight to read. David is tested on whether he has enough faith. The oldest living resident needs David because she is dying but he resists at first.
| 6 | 6 | "Judgment Day" | Michael Ray Rhodes | Tom Blomquist | April 28, 1994 |
A new telephone line causes an accident in which Alice gets hurt. Christy receives donated supplies from her hometown. The mission director surprises them with a visit and is not pleased with some of Christy’s ways. Alice shares a secret with Christy about having a daughter who died.
| 7 | 7 | "Eye of the Storm" | Michael Ray Rhodes | Pamela K. Long & Patricia Green | May 5, 1994 |
Dr. MacNeill helps Christy with teaching the children science. Fairlight begins working at the mission while her husband is away. Alice seems to be angry at Christy. Dr. MacNeill gets a job offer in Baltimore. Christy discovers Becky, a student, has a terrible eye infection. A storm keeps Becky and Christy at Dr. MacNeill’s for the night. He tells Christy the story about his wife, Margaret (Alice’s daughter).
| 8 | 8 | "Amazing Grace" | Michael Rhodes | Kathryn Ford | May 5, 1994 |
Christy meets Hattie, who happens to be blind from trachoma. She is a beautiful singer and writer of music. A new visitor (Mr. Harland) brings a familiar face home to Alice— her daughter, Margaret, who was thought to be dead. Mr. Harland tries to take advantage of Hattie and steal her songs. Dr. MacNeill hears about his wife’s return and is upset by the news. Margaret is ill with tuberculosis and Alice pleads with her to seek help. Margaret leaves before Alice can go with her.

=== Season 2 (1994–95) ===
| No. overall | No. in season | Title | Directed by | Written by | Original release date |
|---|---|---|---|---|---|
| 9 | 1 | "The Sweetest Gift" | Michael Rhodes | Patricia Green & Philip Gerson | November 24, 1994 |
| 10 | 2 | "The Sweetest Gift" | Michael Rhodes | Patricia Green & Philip Gerson | November 24, 1994 |
Christy's father visits. Her father has a stroke, which may force Christy to leave Cutter Gap to care for him. Rev. Grantland waits for a new bell for the church. The mission tries to help the folks of Cutter Gap during a food shortage.
| 11 | 3 | "To Have and to Hold" | Michael Rhodes | Patricia Green | April 15, 1995 |
A proposal for Christy makes her think about whether or not she is ready for marriage. Lundy Taylor is found but in bad condition. It is decided that Lundy will stay at the mission until he gets better. Christy tries to help Lundy and his father reconcile.
| 12 | 4 | "The Hunt" | Michael Ray Rhodes | Pamela K. Long | April 22, 1995 |
The men of Cutter Gap go on their annual hunt for deer. Rev. Grantland's old friend visits from out of town. To Christy's surprise, his old friend is a woman and his first love. Miss Alice goes on a retreat only to be interrupted by a boy and his dog.
| 13 | 5 | "A Man's Reach" | Michael Rhodes | Nicole Yorkin & Dawn Prestwich | April 26, 1995 |
Christy helps Rob Allen prepare for a college scholarship program. Zadie, a fellow student, feels neglected by Christy.
| 14 | 6 | "Ghost Story" | Michael Rhodes | Philip Gerson | June 14, 1995 |
An old ghost story has Christy realizing that her students are very superstitious. Ruby's father returns but treats her badly. Christy sets out with her students to prove that ghost stories are not real.
| 15 | 7 | "Echoes" | Michael Rhodes | Tom Blomquist and Tyne Daly | June 21, 1995 |
Christy and Alice travel to a black community to visit Alice's first mission. They have a run-in with Klan members. Guest-starring Joe Seneca, LeVar Burton, and Olivia Cole.
| 16 | 8 | "The Lie" | Michael Rhodes | Pamela K. Long | June 28, 1995 |
Bessie is jealous when John Spencer has a crush on Christy. Daniel Scott moves to Cutter Gab to be an apprentice to Dr. MacNeill. Bessie spreads a rumor about Christy.
| 17 | 9 | "Green Apples" | Michael Rhodes | Pamela K. Long | July 5, 1995 |
Christy tries to encourage Dr. MacNeill to take Daniel Scott on as his apprentice. Scarlet fever comes to Cutter Gap, and the school is placed under quarantine.
| 18 | 10 | "The Hostage" | Michael Rhodes | Philip Gerson | July 12, 1995 |
Ellie Tatum dies from a neighboring town. Her husband Jarvis believes it is Dr. MacNeill's fault. Jarvis comes across Christy and Rev. Grantland and has them take him to Dr. MacNeill's house. David is shot and Christy is held captive.
| 19 | 11 | "Babe in the Woods" | Michael Rhodes | Kellie Martin and Tom Blomquist | July 19, 1995 |
A baby is found by the children on their way to school. Her birth mother is young and unmarried and cannot keep her. Christy wishes to keep the baby for herself, but Alice thinks it is not a good idea.
| 20 | 12 | "Second Sight" | Gene Reynolds | Kathryn Ford | July 26, 1995 |
Fairlight has a premonition that trouble is coming. A benefactor (Nathan Stone) comes to Cutter Gap. The McHones's son is ill. Nathan Stone wants to purchase land for a lumber mill. Alice is worried about her daughter.
| 21 | 13 | "The Road Home" | Michael Ray Rhodes | Pamela K. Long | August 2, 1995 |
Christy is torn between Dr. MacNeill and Rev. Grantland. The men of Cutter Gap have been going to the "Tea Room" on Saturdays, where "city girls" entertain the men. Daniel Scott's home is burned down. Margaret returns.

== Television movies ==
In 2000, the family-friendly network Pax TV produced three made-for-television movies based on unresolved stories from the novel and original CBS series in response to demand from loyal fans, though Kellie Martin did not return as Christy, with Lauren Lee Smith taking over the role. On November 19, 2000, Pax aired Christy: The Movie. The second and third films aired in 2001 as a two part mini-series entitled Christy, Choices of the Heart, with Part 1 entitled Christy: A Change of Seasons and airing on May 13, 2001, and Part 2 entitled Christy: A New Beginning and airing on May 14, 2001. Stewart Finlay-McLennan (who played Doctor MacNeill), Bruce McKinnon (Jeb Spencer), Mike Hickman (Bird's Eye Taylor), Andy Stahl (Tom McHone), and Dale Dickey (Opal McHone) were the only original TV-series cast members to appear in the telefilms.

The Christy movies were developed for television by executive producer Tom Blomquist, who served as supervising producer of the original CBS series.

== Syndication ==
The show began airing on Gospel Music Channel in June 2009, with a later migration to INSP.

== Home media ==
20th Century Fox released the complete series on DVD in Region 1 on March 20, 2007.

== Festival ==
An annual festival, called "ChristyFest," dedicated to Christy, the novel, television series and movies, was held in Townsend, Tennessee, also home to a private, non-profit museum called Great Smoky Mountains Heritage Center. Taking place during summer, it was a gathering of those dedicated to the preservation of "Christy" and Southern Appalachian culture. Early in 2018 it was announced that the ChristyFest event would never again be held, but that a successor organization called "Christy Friends" would preserve its spirit.

== See also ==
- 1994 in American television
- 1995 in American television
- Appalachian stereotypes
- Great Smoky Mountains Heritage Center
- Music of East Tennessee
