= James Waterston =

American actor

- Born: James Smallwood Waterston; January 17, 1969 (age 57); New York City, U.S.
- Years active: 1980–present
- Spouse: Line Lillevik (m. 2000)
- Father: Sam Waterston
- Relatives: Katherine Waterston (paternal half-sister)

James Waterston (born January 17, 1969) is an American actor. His first role was playing Gerard Pitts in the 1989 film Dead Poets Society, and he has subsequently worked mostly in television.

== Personal life ==
Waterston grew up in New York City, the son of actor Sam Waterston and Barbara Rutledge Johns. His father later remarried, making Waterston the older half-brother of actresses Elisabeth Waterston and Katherine Waterston, and filmmaker Graham Waterston.

Waterston studied at Yale, where he was a member of The Society of Orpheus and Bacchus, an all-male a cappella group. While still in college, but having already appeared in films and television, he formed the theater company Malaparte with numerous friends, including Ethan Hawke and Robert Sean Leonard. During the 1991 to 2000 life of Malaparte, Waterston and his colleagues did everything from directing to taking tickets. Waterston also formed an improv/sketch group called Circus Maximus.

== Career ==
Waterston first came to attention playing Gerard Pitts in the 1989 film Dead Poets Society. While much of his screen work has been in television productions, he did appear in the 2015 film And It Was Good, working with his father Sam and sister Katherine.

Waterston has a number of stage credits, such as the lead role in the 2011 world premiere of Chinglish, by David Henry Hwang, at Chicago's Goodman Theatre. He has starred in many off-Broadway plays in New York City, and New England.

Waterston has appeared in different roles across the Law & Order television franchise over the years. He played a doctor in the Law & Order 1999 episode, "Refuge (Part II)". He also appeared on Law & Order: Special Victims Unit, in the 2008 episode "Inconceivable", as a husband whose wife couldn't conceive without in-vitro fertilization. He returned to Law & Order: Special Victims Unit, in the 2017 episode “Real Fake News”, playing Congressman Luke Bolton, who gets falsely accused of soliciting underage girls.

Waterston has numerous other appearances on episodes of television dramas, such as Diagnosis: Murder, The Good Wife, The Blacklist and others. He played the role of Rev. David Grantland in three made-for-television movies that served as a wrap-up to the Christy television series: Christy: Return to Cutter Gap (2000) and the two-part Christy, Choices of the Heart (2001) (part 1: Christy: A Change of Seasons and part 2: Christy: A New Beginning).

== Filmography ==
=== Film ===
| Year | Title | Role |
|---|---|---|
| 1989 | Dead Poets Society | Gerard Pitts |
| 1989 | Little Sweetheart | Richard |
| 2015 | And It Was Good | Bridegroom |
| 2019 | Human Capital | Andy |

=== Television ===
| Year | Title | Role | Notes |
|---|---|---|---|
| 1999 | Law & Order | Dr. Shimo | Episode: "Refuge (Part II)" |
| 2000 | Christy: Return to Cutter Gap | Rev. David Grantland | Television film |
| 2001 | Shrinking Violet | Greg Stanley | Television film |
| 2001 | Christy, Choices of the Heart | Rev. David Grantland | Miniseries; 2 episodes |
| 2002 | Diagnosis: Murder | Craig Burke | Episode: "Without Warning" |
| 2002 | ER | Mr. Barney | Episode: "Insurrection" |
| 2002 | Live from Baghdad | Eric | Television film |
| 2004 | Six Feet Under | Kyle | 2 episodes |
| 2004 | Wedding Daze | Lyle Mills | Television film |
| 2008-2017 | Law & Order: Special Victims Unit | Mr. Harvey/Congressman Luke Bolton | Episodes: "Inconceivable" and "Real Fake News" |
| 2009 | The Electric Company | Dr. Pinklepurpy Goozibindanansky | Episode: "The Skeleckian Hiccups" |
| 2009 | Law & Order: Criminal Intent | Paul Walters | Episode: "The Glory That Was" |
| 2010 | The Good Wife | Jason Rucker | Episode: "Hi" |
| 2010 | Treme | Street musician | Episode: "Wish Someone Would Care" |
| 2011 | Unforgettable | Ian Smith | Episode: "Check Out Time" |
| 2012 | 666 Park Avenue | John Barlow | Episode: "Pilot" |
| 2013 | Zero Hour | Young Roland | Episode: "Escapement" |
| 2013 | Dear Dumb Diary | Assistant Principal Devon | Television film |
| 2015 | Red Oaks | Dr. Dale Blum | 5 episodes |
| 2015 | Flesh and Bone | Prescott Hawthorn | Miniseries; 4 episodes |
| 2016 | Chicago Fire | Rich Corbin | Episode: "Bad for the Soul" |
| 2017 | The Deuce | —N/a | Episode: "Pilot" |
| 2018 | The Blacklist | Dale Rayburn | Episode: "Anna-Gracia Duerte (No. 25)" |
| 2019 | Blindspot | Calvin Meeks | Episode: "Coder to Killer" |
| 2019 | Modern Love | Chris | Episode: "The Race Grows Sweeter Near Its Final Lap" |
| 2020 | The Politician | —N/a | 2 episodes |
| 2021 | Halston | Mike | Miniseries; episode: "The Sweet Smell of Success" |

=== Theatre ===
| Year | Title | Role | Notes |
|---|---|---|---|
| 2026 | Rope | Judge Kentley | |
