= Gunslingers (2025 film) =

Film by Brian Skiba

- Theatrical release poster
- Directed by: Brian Skiba
- Written by: Brian Skiba
- Produced by: Randall Batinkoff; Brian Skiba; Laurie Love; Scott Reed
- Starring: Stephen Dorff; Heather Graham; Nicolas Cage
- Cinematography: Patrice Lucien Cochet
- Edited by: Brian Skiba
- Music by: Richard Patrick
- Production companies: Milestone Studios: Grindstone Entertainment Group; ZTA Entertainment; Skibavision; Aarimax Films
- Distributed by: Lionsgate
- Release date: April 11, 2025
- Running time: 104 minutes
- Country: United States
- Language: English

Gunslingers is a 2025 American Western action film written, produced, directed, and edited by Brian Skiba. It stars Stephen Dorff, Heather Graham and Nicolas Cage.

== Plot ==
Thomas Keller, an outlaw with the largest reward in history, is on the run after killing a member of the Rockefeller family four years prior. He joins the town of Redemption, a town where outlaws fake their deaths and reintegrate into society under false names. The townsfolk, led by another ex-outlaw named Jericho, help Thomas to fake his death.

Several months after his supposed death, a woman named Val comes into town with her young daughter Gracie, looking for Thomas. Val has been shot in the leg. Meanwhile, a mercenary discovers Thomas's empty coffin, and calls in a larger posse. This posse, led by Thomas's brother Robert Keller, confront Jericho at the saloon. Robert reveals himself as Val's husband, and the man who shot her. He offers to take Thomas and his wife and leave in peace, or to arrest all of the outlaws in Redemption.

A gunfight breaks out. Upon hearing the commotion, Thomas makes his way to the saloon from the outskirts of town. He confronts Robert, who says that if he does not bring Thomas back to New York to hang, the Rockefellers will kill him. Thomas refuses.

Robert's men surround the saloon. Robert gives the saloon occupants fifteen minutes to leave before he attacks, promising safety for any who do. The outlaws decide to stay and fight, but send out civilian patrons. Robert and his men shoot all the patrons who exit.

During a lull in the fighting, Kelly, one of the outlaws, slips out of the saloon and makes a deal with Robert in exchange for his own freedom. In the morning, Kelly sneaks Robert's men into the saloon. Thomas, Val, and Gracie leave at gunpoint. Robert then tosses dynamite into the saloon, causing a large explosion that kills or stuns most of the outlaws inside. He rounds up all of the living outlaws except Jericho and his daughter, Bella.

Robert attempts to hang the outlaws, but is interrupted by Jericho and Bella. In the ensuing gunfight, Val and Gracie are dragged away, and Thomas chases after them. After a scuffle, Robert grabs Gracie and points a gun at her. He reveals Gracie is Thomas's child, and that if Thomas does not kill himself, he will kill her. Thomas instead shoots Robert.

An undisclosed amount of time later, the outlaws pay Kelly a visit.

== Cast ==
- Stephen Dorff as Thomas Keller
- Heather Graham as Val
- Nicolas Cage as Ben
- Scarlet Rose Stallone as Bella
- Tzi Ma as Lin
- Jeremy Kent Jackson as Robert Keller
- Costas Mandylor as Jericho
- Cooper Barnes as Levi
- Bre Blair as Mary
- Randall Batinkoff as Doc
- William McNamara as Kelly
- Mohamed Karim as Hoodoo
- Forest Wilder as Kid
- Forrie J. Smith as Barker
- Laurie Love as Thalia
- Ava Monroe Tadross as Grace
- Eric Mabius as Edward
- Mitchell Hoog as Jesse Rockefeller
- Brooklen Wilkes as Hope
- Dan O'Brien as Josh
- Kartuah Chapman as Tim

== Production ==
In May 2024, it was announced that post-production had begun on a western action film titled Gunslingers, after filming occurred in Cave City, Kentucky, Barren County, Hart County, and Edmonson County. Brian Skiba wrote, co-produced, and directed the film, with Nicolas Cage, Stephen Dorff, Heather Graham, Scarlet Rose Stallone, Randall Batinkoff, Tzi Ma, Costas Mandylor, Cooper Barnes, and Bre Blair starring.

== Release ==
Gunslingers was released in selected theaters in the United States, and on video on demand on April 11, 2025.

== Reception ==
On the review aggregator website Rotten Tomatoes, 5% of 21 critics' reviews are positive, with an average rating of 3.2/10. Metacritic, which uses a weighted average, assigned the film a score of 20 out of 100, based on six critics, indicating "generally unfavorable" reviews.

=== Accolades ===
Accolades received by Gunslingers
Award	Date of ceremony	Category	Recipient(s)	Result	Ref.
Golden Raspberry Awards	March 14, 2026	Worst Supporting Actor	Nicolas Cage	Nominated	
Golden Raspberry Awards	March 14, 2026	Worst Supporting Actress	Scarlet Rose Stallone	Won	
