= Mutant X (TV series) =

Superhero television series

- Genre: Superhero
- Created by: Avi Arad
- Starring: Forbes March; Victoria Pratt; Lauren Lee Smith; Victor Webster; John Shea; Karen Cliche
- Composers: Donald Quan; Lou Natale
- Countries of origin: Canada; United States
- Original language: English
- No. of seasons: 3
- No. of episodes: 66 (list of episodes)

Production
- Executive producers: Avi Arad; Jay Firestone; Adam Haight; Peter Mohan
- Cinematography: Colin Hoult; Nikos Evdemon; Alwyn Kumst; Jim Westenbrink
- Editors: David B. Thompson; Dave Goard; Eric Goddard; Dean Balser; Paul Whitehead
- Running time: 44 minutes
- Production companies: Fireworks Entertainment; Marvel Studios; Global Television Network; Tribune Entertainment

Original release
- Network: Syndicated
- Release: October 6, 2001 – May 17, 2004

Mutant X is a superhero television series created under a Marvel Comics license, but with no connection to the Mutant X comic book series at all. It debuted in first-run syndication on October 6, 2001. The show was created by Avi Arad, and it centers on Mutant X, a team of "new mutants" who possess extraordinary powers as a result of genetic engineering. The members of Mutant X were used as test subjects in a series of covert government experiments. The mission of Mutant X is to seek out and protect their fellow new mutants. The series was described as where the X Men meets The Matrix. The series was filmed in Toronto, Ontario, Canada.

Despite being announced for a fourth season, the series was abruptly cancelled in 2004 after the dismantling of Fireworks Entertainment, one of the show's production companies, ending the show with an unresolved cliffhanger.

== Characters ==
=== Main ===
- Jesse Kilmartin (Forbes March) can alter the density of his body at will. Kilmartin is the only known new mutant to have surpassed his "expiration date". As a molecular new mutant, he can become intangible or super-dense, making him almost impervious to harm. He can only maintain these forms for as long as he can hold his breath, and is able to extend his powers to people or objects through physical contact. He serves as the technology and computer expert of the team.
- Shalimar Fox (Victoria Pratt) is a recombination of human and animal DNA – a "feline feral" – giving her superhuman strength, agility and senses, and healing powers. After further mutation, she develops a sixth sense which allows her to anticipate incoming danger to herself. Adam found her starving and frightened in a sleazy motel. Like all feline ferals, Shalimar is extremely territorial, has a heightened fear of fire, and is immune to hypnosis.
- Emma DeLauro (Lauren Lee Smith) is a "tele-empath" who can communicate feelings and emotions to, and receive them from, others around her. She has limited precognition, and also has the ability to induce hallucinations into the minds of others by drawing upon their own emotions and feelings. Emma later developed the power to project blasts of pure psychic energy which she uses to knock her opponents unconscious, alter and erase memories, and even kill. Before Adam found her, DeLauro sold clothes and used her control of emotions to become a successful businesswoman. Initially resistant to joining Mutant X, she eventually developed an attachment to Brennan. DeLauro was killed in an explosion at Naxcon Corporation Industries, Nicholas Fox's company. (seasons 1–2)
- Brennan Mulwray (Victor Webster) is an "elemental electrical" mutant with the ability to generate electricity, enough to power a small city. He can shoot electrical bolts from his hands which, if fired downward, are capable of launching him high into the air. His primary weakness is water, which causes him to short-circuit. Before Adam Kane found Mulwray, he had been a thief; Mason Eckhart captured him and used him to hunt down the other new mutants. However, Mulwray escaped and managed to join Mutant X along with Emma DeLauro.
- Adam Kane (John Shea) is the strategist and moral center of Mutant X. Head chief bio-geneticist of the scientific experiments that led to the creation of the new mutants, Kane created Mutant X to atone for his mistakes. The group seeks to protect new mutants and help them control their powers. Viewing the new mutants as his responsibility, Kane is looking for treatments for their various conditions. To this end, Kane has stolen the creator's database, which can be used to track other new mutants. (seasons 1–2; recurring, season 3)
- Lexa Pierce (Karen Cliche) is the first member added to the original Mutant X team. As a "chromatic elemental-molecular hybrid" mutant, she can bend light to make herself and anything she is touching temporarily invisible. In addition, she can shoot beams of light from her fingertips and can project blinding flashes. She is searching for her long-lost brother, and her methods and motives leave her untrusted by her teammates. (season 3)

=== Recurring ===
- Mason Eckhart (Tom McCamus) is the former head of security of Genomex and the current head of the Genetic Security Agency, GSA. After an accident involving Adam and the production of the new mutants, Eckhart's immune system has been severely weakened, forcing him to wear a white wig, synthetic skin and thick gloves. He formed the GSA to protect the public from what he deemed as a threat from the new mutants, capturing them to perform further genetic testing to find a "cure". He is put into stasis after being double-crossed by one of his agents and Dr. Harrison, allowing Ashlocke to rise to power. Sometime before the season 2 finale, he escaped his imprisonment and convinced Shalimar's father to fund his research to cure Eckhart, but he is ultimately killed by Brennan.
- Dr. Kenneth Harrison (Andrew Gillies) is a biogeneticist working for Tricorp Botanicals and a former employee of Genomex. Eckhart seeks him out to produce a mind-controlling toxin from the plants he studies so he can create new mutants under his own control. He continues to work with the GSA, but ultimately double-crosses Eckhart to allow Ashlocke to take control of Genomex.
- Gabriel Ashlocke (Michael Easton) is patient zero of the new mutants. He possesses the abilities of all known kinds of new mutants, particularly the Mutant X team. In the past, Adam was hired by Genomex to attempt to hamper the young Ashlocke's powers and psychopathy, but he failed to prevent the boy from killing his parents in a powerful rage and only damaged the young boy's genome. To prevent his death, Ashlocke was put in stasis, only to be freed by a member of the GSA to usurp Eckhart's power. Ashlocke takes his revenge against Adam and Mutant X in his attempts to prevent his own death, but is ultimately unsuccessful. However, his loyal followers known as the "Links" use the genetic material of four similarly-powered new mutants, including Brennan, to produce a child that would effectively be Ashlocke's second coming. Another new mutant whose DNA was used to make this child took the boy into her own care to raise him to be a kind person instead of the monster Ashlocke turned out to be. (seasons 1–2)
- An unnamed individual (played by George Buza) acts as the liaison between Lexa and the Dominion, as the Mutant X team works for the Dominion to solve new mutant-related mysteries and crimes. (season 3)

== Episodes ==
Season	Episodes	Originally released	
Season	Episodes	First released	Last released
1	22	October 6, 2001	July 6, 2002
2	22	October 5, 2002	May 12, 2003
3	22	September 29, 2003	May 17, 2004

== Home media ==
ADV Films released all three seasons on DVD in region 1 in 2004 and 2005. In late 2008, a complete series collection was scheduled to be released by ADV Films, but was later cancelled.

In 2008, Beyond Home Entertainment also re-released each season for region 4.

In 2010, Alliance Home Entertainment re-released each season on DVD in Canada. Season 1 was released on August 31, season 2 on September 28, and season 3 on October 26.

In region 2, Revelation Films released all three seasons individually on March 25, 2013. They released a complete series set on DVD in the UK on June 20, 2016. On October 24, 2016, Revelation Films released a region free complete series Blu-ray set.

Lionsgate Home Entertainment released the complete series on DVD on February 26, 2019.

The complete series was made available to stream on Disney+ in Canada on May 17, 2025.

== Comic book tie-ins ==
In May 2002, Marvel Comics released a tie-in comic called Mutant X: Origin, which chronicled the early life of Adam Kane. In the story, Adam and a friend Paul did research on the DNA of the mustard plant in college that drew the attention of the U.S. government, who offered them the Genomex company to work on a cure to genetic diseases. During this story, Eckhart is exposed to radiation, which leads to his vulnerability to diseases. A second tie-in comic called Mutant X: Dangerous Decisions was released in June 2002.

== Lawsuits ==
On April 15, 2001, 20th Century Fox sued Marvel, Tribune Entertainment, and Fireworks Entertainment for breach of their licensing agreement and false advertisement. Fox stated it had exclusive rights from Marvel to develop the X-Men property, and anything similar was an infringement. Fox claimed that Mutant X was too similar to X-Men, and Mutant X was being advertised as an "X-Men replacement".

Marvel countersued Fox, saying that the two were dissimilar and asking the courts to allow Mutant X production to go forward. Production was allowed, as long as X-Men material was not used in the promotion of Mutant X.

On March 9, 2003, Fox and Marvel resolved their differences in a confidential settlement of their suits. Meanwhile, Fox continued to pursue their case against Tribune and Fireworks. Tribune sued Marvel for fraud and breach of contract, claiming Marvel encouraged Tribune to connect Mutant X to the X-Men, misrepresented what they were getting in their license, and caused millions in losses due to the need to alter storylines and characters to ensure the mandated distance between Mutant X and X-Men, as well as fighting Fox's litigation. In November 2005, the dispute was settled out of court.
