= For Keeps (film) =

1988 film by John G. Avildsen

- Theatrical release poster
- Directed by: John G. Avildsen
- Written by: Denise DeClue; Tim Kazurinsky
- Produced by: Jerry Belson; Walter Coblenz
- Starring: Molly Ringwald; Randall Batinkoff; Kenneth Mars
- Cinematography: James Crabe
- Edited by: John G. Avildsen
- Music by: Bill Conti
- Production company: ML Delphi Premier Productions
- Distributed by: Tri-Star Pictures
- Release date: January 15, 1988
- Running time: 98 minutes
- Country: United States
- Language: English
- Box office: $17.5 million

For Keeps is a 1988 American coming of age comedy drama film directed by John G. Avildsen. Starring Molly Ringwald and Randall Batinkoff as Darcy Elliot and Stan Bobrucz, two high school seniors in love, complications ensue when Darcy becomes pregnant just before graduation and decides to keep her baby Thea. This movie is noted for being Ringwald's final "teen" film, and is cited as one of her most mature performances, particularly in a scene where Darcy is suffering from postpartum depression after the birth of her child.

== Plot ==
In Kenosha, Wisconsin, high school seniors Darcy Elliot, editor of the school paper, and her boyfriend Stan Bobrucz have both been accepted to college: Darcy to the University of Wisconsin–Madison to study journalism, and Stan to Caltech to study architecture. Before starting college, Darcy is to travel to Paris with her single mother, Donna, as a graduation present.

With the help of Darcy's best friend, Lila, Darcy and Stan spend a weekend together, and Darcy becomes pregnant. They tell their families at Thanksgiving. Neither family is supportive: Donna urges the young couple to have an abortion, and Stan's Catholic parents urge them to give the baby up for adoption. Darcy plans to have an abortion but does not go through with it, to Stan's relief.

At Christmas, the couple announces their plans to keep the baby, causing a rift with their parents. They rent a run-down apartment and marry in front of their cheering friends, although without parental consent the marriage is not legal.

Darcy's guidance counselor, Miss Giles, urges her to leave school, saying that other girls would follow her example and become teenage mothers themselves; Darcy drops out but works toward her GED. Her water breaks at the prom.

Their daughter, Thea (short for Theodosia), is born healthy, but Darcy develops post-partum depression and is unable even to hold the baby, while Stan struggles to pay the bills on a part-time wage. Darcy comes out of her depression only when she hears an intruder (Stan's father, Vic) and picks up the baby to protect her.

Without telling Darcy, Stan gives up his Caltech scholarship because the school has no married housing for undergraduates. They begin to fight. Although Stan takes a second job, the bills pile up; when Thea falls ill, their landlady evicts them, and the couple moves in with Donna. The move alienates Stan and Darcy and drives Stan to drink heavily.

When Michaela, a girl from the neighborhood, tells Darcy that Stan has given up the scholarship, Darcy enlists Stan's best friend, Chris, in a plan to make sure Stan takes the scholarship and goes to Caltech after all. The plan involves throwing Stan out and annulling the marriage. Stan takes the news badly and, later that night, flies into a rage outside the house. He reconciles with his parents but is heartbroken over the split with Darcy, who holds to her decision but is visibly angered by her mother's coldness.

At Darcy's night-school graduation, Stan tells her that he has applied for scholarships to the University of Wisconsin–Madison for both of them. Darcy lets slip her part in the Caltech plan with Chris, and Stan chases after her as she drives away.

Darcy tells Donna that Stan is a good man and that she loves him, and that Donna can either accept them as a family or watch them live their lives without her. Donna lets go of her hurt over being abandoned by Darcy's father and, when Stan seeks her out, tells him about her daughter. The couple reconciles at the school and plans to attend college in Madison in the fall, as well as to set a curfew for Thea.

== Cast ==
- Molly Ringwald as Darcy Elliot Bobrucz
- Randall Batinkoff as Stan Bobrucz
- Kenneth Mars as Vic Bobrucz
- Miriam Flynn as Donna Elliot
- Conchata Ferrell as Mrs. Bobrucz
- Sharon Brown as Lila
- John Zarchen as Chris
- Pauly Shore as Retro
- Michelle Downey as Michaela
- Patricia Barry as Adoption Official
- Janet MacLachlan as Miss Giles
- Jaclyn Bernstein as Mary Bobrucz
- Matthew Licht as Lou Bobrucz
- Renée Estevez as Marnie
- Darcy DeMoss as Elaine
- Leslie Bega as Carlita
- Jack Ong as Reverend Kim
- Sean Frye as Wee Willy
- J. Trevor Edmond as Ace
- Brandon Douglas as Trapper
- Peggy Walton-Walker as Bookkeeper
- Larry Drake as Night Clerk
- Steven Eckholdt as Ronald
- Hailey Ellen Agnew as Theodosia "Thea" Bobrucz
- Tino Insana as Captain O'Connell
- Steven Barr as Sergeant Blaine
- Alex Trebek as himself

== Production ==
=== Filming ===
The film is set in Kenosha, Wisconsin, and was partially filmed there. Primary filming took place in Winnipeg, Manitoba, Canada.

The film had a number of titles while in production, possibilities including Maybe, Baby (by which it is known in some overseas territories) and For Keeps?, before settling on the final question mark-less version.

John Zarchen suffered a life-threatening head injury while driving in Hollywood. He survived a brief period of being comatose and actually returned to the film, although director John Avildsen, due to his medical absence, reduced his role. This movie also marks the debut film appearance of Alex Trebek as himself, as well as of Pauly Shore, who appears in a small role as Retro, another friend of Stan Bobrucz (Randall Batinkoff).

The musical score features a lullaby-like version of the song "Be My Baby".

=== Casting ===
Actor Adam Silbar was originally cast in the lead role of Stan but, for unknown reasons, the role was later re-cast with Randall Batinkoff just weeks before the first day of production. Author and casting director Paul G. Bens Jr., then an actor, was one of the two finalists to replace Silbar. The role ultimately went to Batinkoff.

== Box office ==
In January 1988, the film debuted at #4 at the box office (behind Good Morning, Vietnam, Three Men and a Baby, and Moonstruck). It ultimately grossed $17,514,553 domestically.

== Reception ==
On review aggregate website Rotten Tomatoes, For Keeps has an approval rating of 17% based on 12 reviews. Roger Ebert gave the film a positive review saying, "The movies of Molly Ringwald have been responsible for a revolution in the way Hollywood regards teenagers. Before Ringwald (and her mentor, John Hughes) there were only horny teenagers, dead teenagers, teenage vampires and psychotic crackups. Now teenage movies are working their way through some of the aspects of the normal life of American teenagers, and in For Keeps, Ringwald plays a popular high school senior who gets pregnant and gets married."

Janet Maslin of The New York Times said, "Most of For Keeps is entirely predictable, but that should do little to diminish its interest for audiences of high-school age. Here again, Miss Ringwald is the very model of teen-age verisimilitude, and she's most impressive in making even the most hackneyed situations seem real. In fact, she's so good she's almost a problem. Mr. Batinkoff, while pleasant, is no real match for her, and the glowering parents who make their kids' lives miserable for a time are no real threat. There is the feeling that Miss Ringwald's Darcy can triumph over anything. But perhaps that's just what Mr. Avildsen had in mind."

The Chicago Tribune found much to criticize: “In the mawkish, unconvincing ‘For Keeps,’ Molly Ringwald stars as the brightest, prettiest high school student in Kenosha, Wis….newcomer Randall Batinkoff, playing the brightest, prettiest high school student in Kenosha.…The film is full of carefully balanced moral proclamations, to the point where it begins to resemble an episode of ‘Nightline’….Once the ‘issues’ have been swept away, director Avildsen can get down to his real agenda: ‘For Keeps’ turns into a conventional ‘go-for-it’ movie, designed to communicate the joy of triumph over unimaginable odds….The screenplay…does have its moments of verbal cleverness, which probably would have seemed a lot funnier had Avildsen given any sign whatever of getting the jokes. Instead he surrounds the dialogue with awkward pauses and enforces blunt line readings that give the film the rhythm of a rusty pile-driver. Ringwald retains enough of her natural charm to avoid disgrace, though Avildsen’s thick direction makes it seem as if she’d lost a few crucial IQ points since ‘The Pick-up Artist.’ Batinkoff, for his part, carries on the noble teen hunk tradition of Martin Hewitt in ‘Endless Love.’ More callow you do not get.”

Brian Pope of DVD Verdict gave a positive review in 2004, saying, "Pretty but approachable, smart but funny, cool but sweet, Ringwald represented everything most high-school girls wanted to be: the girl next door who always got the guy without compromising her values. Small wonder she is still regarded as an icon of 1980s teen cinema. It wasn't until Ringwald began dipping her toes into slightly more adult roles that she lost her footing. Take For Keeps, for instance. This movie dared to suggest that even a popular honors student is capable of making wrong decisions that result in life-changing consequences. More crucially, Ringwald suggested to her fans that the qualities they found so endearing in her aren't always adequate substitutes for natural maturity. Perhaps that was a bitter pill for her fans to swallow, but it's not such a bad message, and, more than 15 years after its release, For Keeps isn't such a bad movie."

David Nusair of Reel Film gave a more negative review in 2001: "For Keeps takes a potentially intriguing subject (two teenagers attempting to start their lives together) and piles on cliché after cliché, until it's about as compelling as an afterschool special."

== Home media ==
On March 23, 2004, the film was released on DVD.
