= Helen (2009 film) =

- Theatrical release poster
- Directed by: Sandra Nettelbeck
- Screenplay by: Sandra Nettelbeck
- Produced by: Christine Haebler; Judy Tossell
- Starring: Ashley Judd; Goran Višnjić; Lauren Lee Smith
- Cinematography: Michael Bertl
- Edited by: Barry Egan
- Music by: James Edward Barker; Tim Despic
- Production companies: Egoli Tossell Film; Insight Film Studios
- Distributed by: Warner Bros. Pictures (Germany); Alliance Films (Canada)
- Release dates: January 16, 2009 (Sundance Film Festival); November 26, 2009 (Germany); January 29, 2010 (Canada)
- Running time: 120 minutes
- Countries: Germany; Canada
- Language: English
- Budget: $8 million

Helen is a 2009 drama film starring Ashley Judd and directed by Sandra Nettelbeck. It follows a professor (Judd) who overcomes severe depression after a massive breakdown, with the help of new friend Matilda (Smith). Filming took place late 2007 in Vancouver.

== Cast ==
- Ashley Judd as Helen Leonard, a college professor who is married to David, the ex-wife of Frank and mother of Julie.
- Goran Višnjić as David Leonard, Helen's husband and Julie's stepfather.
- Lauren Lee Smith as Mathilda, a young woman who Helen befriends during her treatment.
- Alexia Fast as Julie, Helen and Frank's daughter and David's stepdaughter.
- Alberta Watson as Dr. Sherman
- Leah Cairns as Susanna
- David Hewlett as Frank, Julie's biological father and Helen's ex-husband. It is later revealed that Frank has been aware of Helen's fragile mental state and her illness for quite some time which presumably later caused their marriage to fail.
- David Nykl as John
- Chelah Horsdal as Kara
- Conrad Coates as Stephen
- Veena Sood as Defense Attorney

== Release ==
The film was released at the Sundance Film Festival in January 2009, and later at the Atlantic Film Festival in Canada. Lauren Lee Smith won the award for Best Supporting Actress at the 2010 Leo Awards, beating co-star Alexia Fast. It was nominated for Best Feature and Production Design. Helen was released to DVD in August 2010. It currently holds a score of 44% on Rotten Tomatoes, based on 9 reviews.
