= Pathology (film) =

2008 film by Marc Schölermann

- Theatrical release poster
- Directed by: Marc Schölermann
- Written by: Neveldine/Taylor
- Produced by: Neveldine/Taylor; Gary Lucchesi; Tom Rosenberg; Richard S. Wright; Gary Gilbert; Skip Williamson
- Starring: Milo Ventimiglia; Alyssa Milano; Lauren Lee Smith; Dan Callahan; Michael Weston; Johnny Whitworth; Keir O'Donnell; Larry Drake
- Cinematography: Ekkehart Pollack
- Edited by: Todd E. Miller
- Music by: Johannes Kobilke; Robb Williamson
- Production companies: Metro-Goldwyn-Mayer Pictures; Lakeshore Entertainment; Camelot Pictures
- Distributed by: MGM Distribution Co.
- Release dates: April 11, 2008 (United Kingdom); April 18, 2008 (United States)
- Running time: 95 minutes
- Country: United States
- Language: English
- Budget: $8 million
- Box office: $3.2 million

Pathology is a 2008 crime horror film directed by Marc Schölermann, written by Mark Neveldine and Brian Taylor, and starring Milo Ventimiglia, Michael Weston, Alyssa Milano, and Lauren Lee Smith. The film premiered in the United Kingdom on April 11, 2008, and opened in limited release in the United States on April 18, 2008.

== Plot ==
The intro shows a camera recording faces of corpses, with their mouths being moved by medical residents.

Dr. Teddy Grey graduates at the top of his class from Harvard Medical School and joins one of the nation's most prestigious pathology residency programs. There, a rivalry develops between a group of interns and Teddy. They invite him into their group, which entertains itself with a secret after-hours game at the morgue of who can commit the perfect undetectable murder. Eventually the group's leader, Jake Gallo, realizes that Teddy is sleeping with his girlfriend, Juliette Bath. When Teddy catches several members of the group in lies, he realizes that what initially seemed like vigilante killings are, in reality, innocent people murdered for sport.

Teddy's fiancée Gwen arrives to stay with him in his apartment. Gallo, angered by Juliette's infidelity, kills her for the next game. However, just as they are about to begin the autopsy on Juliette (in the meantime plotting Teddy's death), Gallo realizes that the gas has been left on in the room. Teddy rigged the gas to kill everyone in the group. This results in a massive explosion as one of the group lights a crystal-meth pipe. Everyone in the room is caught in the explosion. Gallo realizes what is about to happen and survives. Teddy is seen walking away from the explosion.

Later, Gallo manages to kill Gwen in what he believes to be the "perfect murder". Upon completing his autopsy report on his murdered fiancée, Teddy is knocked out by Gallo and then is forced to trade verbal barbs with him. Teddy uses some of Gallo's own rhetoric against him in reverse psychology fashion, after which fellow pathologist Ben Stravinsky frees Teddy and together they kill Gallo in exactly the same way that he killed Teddy's fiancée. In the process, they vivisect Gallo.

== Cast ==
- Milo Ventimiglia as Ted Grey
- Michael Weston as Jake Gallo
- Alyssa Milano as Gwen Williamson
- Lauren Lee Smith as Juliette Bath
- Johnny Whitworth as Griffin Cavanaugh
- John de Lancie as Dr. Quentin Morris
- Mei Melançon as Catherine Ivy
- Keir O'Donnell as Ben Stravinsky
- Dan Callahan as Chip Bentwood
- Larry Drake as Fat Bastard
- Buddy Lewis as Harper Johnson
- Alan Blumenfeld as Mr. Williamson
- Deborah Pollack as Mrs. Williamson
- Sam Witwer as Party Boy

== Production ==
The cast was announced on April 4, 2007, and filming started in May 2007.

== Critical reception ==
The film received mixed reviews from critics. As of December 8, 2012, the review aggregator Rotten Tomatoes reported that 43% of critics gave the film positive reviews, based on 21 reviews. Metacritic reported the film had an average score of 55 out of 100, based on 8 reviews.

== Soundtrack ==
The soundtrack to Pathology was released on April 29, 2008.

No.	Title	Artist	Length
1.	"The List"	Danny Lohner a.k.a. Renholder	3:58
2.	"Unintended Consequences"	Legion of Doom featuring Triune	2:07
3.	"Parade Of The Horribles"	Circle Jerks	1:28
4.	"F*ck Me, Please / Meeting the Interns"	Robert Williamson	4:37
5.	"We Don't Like You"	Robert Williamson	1:27
6.	"Harper Johnson"	Robert Williamson	0:55
7.	"Disagreement"	Robert Williamson	7:56
8.	"Ohrenschmerz"	Robert Williamson	6:18
9.	"Dr. Crack"	Robert Williamson	2:54
10.	"Killing Daddy"	Robert Williamson	2:07
11.	"Who Is The Best"	Robert Williamson	1:08
12.	"Juliette And Ted"	Robert Williamson	1:11
13.	"Liebeszauber"	Robert Williamson	1:33
14.	"Smoking Kills"	Robert Williamson	1:17
15.	"The Morgue"	Robert Williamson	3:58
16.	"Confrontation"	Robert Williamson	2:10
17.	"Meeting At The Morgue"	Robert Williamson	2:33
18.	"Ted Runs"	Robert Williamson	1:23
19.	"Gwen's Theme"	Robert Williamson	2:12
20.	"Final Meeting"	Robert Williamson	4:56
21.	"Bibo no Aozora"	Selectracks Studio Ensemble	2:55
Total length:			59:03
