= A Man Called Peter =

1955 film

- Directed by: Henry Koster
- Screenplay by: Eleanore Griffin
- Based on: A Man Called Peter by Catherine Marshall
- Produced by: Samuel G. Engel
- Starring: Richard Todd; Jean Peters
- Cinematography: Harold Lipstein
- Edited by: Robert L. Simpson
- Music by: Alfred Newman
- Production company: 20th Century Fox
- Distributed by: Twentieth Century-Fox Film Corporation
- Release date: March 31, 1955
- Running time: 119 minutes
- Country: United States
- Language: English
- Budget: $1.74 million
- Box office: $4.5 million (US rentals)

A Man Called Peter is a 1955 American drama film directed by Henry Koster, and starring Richard Todd. The film is based on the life of preacher Peter Marshall, who served as Chaplain of the United States Senate and pastor of the New York Avenue Presbyterian Church in Washington, D. C., before his early death. It is adapted from the 1951 biography of the same name, written by his widow, Catherine Marshall.

The film was a box-office hit in 1955, and it was nominated for an Oscar in 1956 for its color cinematography.

This was the final feature film of the actress Jean Peters, who played Catherine Marshall. Alfred Newman reused much of his score from his 1948 film The Walls of Jericho.

== Plot ==
As a boy growing up in Coatbridge, Scotland, Peter Marshall loves the sea and wishes to work on a ship. Several years later, he is caught in a fog, and nearly falls over a ledge. Survival compels him to dedicate his life to the ministry. He begins working double-shifts to save enough money to go to school in America. He gets there, and again works very hard to save enough to pay for divinity school. Upon graduation, he is called to serve as pastor at a rural church in Covington, Georgia.

His sermons are well-received, and soon, people are coming from near and far. Catherine Wood, from nearby Agnes Scott College, falls in love with Peter the first time she hears him speak.

Catherine impresses Peter by helping him at an event for college students where she gives an extemporaneous speech using quotes from his sermons. They eventually marry. Their honeymoon is spent on an ocean voyage and fishing trip. Catherine gets seasick, and refuses to get into a fishing boat.

They return from their honeymoon to Washington, D.C., where Peter has accepted a position as pastor of the New York Avenue Presbyterian Church. Services are sparsely attended, and Peter invites people from all walks of life. This incurs the wrath of the local church snob, but despite this the services are soon overflowing.

Peter's son, Peter John, is born the morning of December 7, 1941. That morning, as Pearl Harbor is attacked, Peter preaches at the United States Naval Academy in Annapolis. He is inspired to change his planned sermon to a sermon about death and eternal life. He describes death as going to sleep in one room and waking up the next morning in the room where you belong.

Catherine contracts tuberculosis and is bedridden. She listens to Peter's sermon about a woman healed by touching the hem of Jesus' robes. When Peter returns home, Catherine has left her bed and walked down the stairs of her home for the first time in three years.

Peter and Catherine buy a vacation home in Cape Cod. Peter takes his son fishing, but Catherine refuses to go on the water.

When they return, Peter is stricken ill while preaching, and is rushed to the hospital. He has suffered a coronary thrombosis. After a short time of rest, he returns to preaching, and accepts an appointment as Chaplain of the United States Senate. One night, Peter wakes Catherine, telling her that he is in pain. As an ambulance is taking him away, she asks to come along. He says she must stay with their son, and that he will see her in the morning. Later, the hospital calls to let her know Peter has died. That summer, she takes her son to the cottage at Cape Cod. He wants to go out on the boat. She realizes he can't go alone and she gets in the boat with him.

== Cast ==
- Richard Todd as The Reverend Peter Marshall
- Jean Peters as Catherine Wood Marshall
- Marjorie Rambeau as Miss Laura Fowler
- Jill Esmond as Mrs. Findlay
- Les Tremayne as Senator Willis K. Harvey
- Robert Burton as Mr. Peyton
- Gladys Hurlbut as Mrs. Peyton
- Richard Garrick as Colonel Evanston Whiting
- Gloria Gordon as Barbara
- Billy Chapin as Peter John Marshall
- Ricky Kelman (uncredited)
- Charles Evans as the President of Senate

== Production ==
Richard Burton was originally meant to play the lead.

Richard Todd later recalled "The subject matter of A Man Called Peter seemed to have cast a spell over everybody concerned with the picture. Shooting was by no means leisurely, but we were all imbued with a team spirit even greater than was usual on the studio floor."

== Premiere ==
The film premiered simultaneously in Glasgow, Scotland; London, England; and New York City, USA. A parade to the theater featured members of the Scottish War Veterans, members of the Royal Canadian Legion, nurses from the Caledonian Hospital, and a seventy-man color guard. Author Catherine Marshall attended the premiere, as did several prominent religious leaders of New York City, including the Reverend Phillips P. Elliott, president of the Protestant Council of New York City; Dr. Franklin Clark Fry, president of the United Lutheran Church in America; and the Right Reverend Charles F. Boynton, Suffragan Bishop at New York's Cathedral of St. John the Divine.

== Reception ==
"... It shows us events no more spectacular than the preaching of sermons, the doing of good deeds and the bickering of a strong and forthright preacher with the more conservative members of his flock. And yet this CinemaScope picture ... has a form and a dramatic cohesion deriving from the magnetism of the leading character that render it much more absorbing than many a heavily plotted film."

—Bosley Crowther, reviewing A Man Called Peter in The New York Times

Bosley Crowther, the notoriously acerbic movie critic for The New York Times, gave the film a glowing review. Calling it "a surprising and extraordinary film", he also heaped praise on Richard Todd's acting, saying he "brings a fervor and eloquence to his acting that fairly lift him right out of the large screen".

== See also ==
- List of American films of 1955

== Bibliography ==
- Solomon, Aubrey (1989), Twentieth Century Fox: A Corporate and Financial History, Scarecrow Press.
- Brode, Douglas (1988), Lost Films of the Fifties, Citadel Press.
