= 37: A Final Promise =

- Film poster
- Directed by: Randall Batinkoff
- Screenplay by: Randall Batinkoff; Jesse Stratton
- Produced by: Randall Batinkoff; Guy Blews; Leila Jewel Djansi
- Starring: Randall Batinkoff; Scottie Thompson
- Cinematography: Wes Cardino
- Edited by: Chris W. Hill
- Music by: Cathleen Flynn
- Production company: Gravitas Ventures
- Release date: 8 August 2014
- Running time: 92 minutes
- Country: United States
- Language: English

37: A Final Promise (shown onscreen as 37) is a 2014 American romantic drama film directed by Randall Batinkoff and starring himself and Scottie Thompson. The film is about a rockstar who plans to commit suicide at age 37 and released to negative reviews.

== Cast ==
- Randall Batinkoff as Adam
  - Gianni DeCenzo as young Adam
- Scottie Thompson as Jemma
- Tricia Helfer as Christina
- Kate Nauta as Dani
- Scott Wolf as Sean Raydo
- Leon Robinson as Dr. Koehm
- Bruce Davison as Psychic

== Soundtrack ==
The music was composed by Cathleen Flynn.

No.	Title	Singer(s)	Length
1.	"Under Control"	Carey Ott	5:03
2.	"Pablo Picasso"	Carey Ott	4:01
3.	"Q"	Carey Ott	5:30
4.	"No Answer"	Dark Chapter	4:13
5.	"Burn Away"	Dark Chapter	4:50
6.	"Temporary Suicide"	Dark Chapter	4:36
7.	"Let's Go"	Francesco Riva	1:34
8.	"True Lies"	Monroe	3:24
9.	"Photograph"	Kate Nauta	4:14
10.	"Seagulls in Flight"	Cathleen Flynn, Francesco Riva	3:19
11.	"Love in Mind"	Alex Wise	4:07
12.	"Jemma Angel"	Cathleen Flynn, Francesco Riva	1:42
13.	"I Do"	Cathleen Flynn, Francesco Riva	1:58
14.	"Jemma's Wish"	Cathleen Flynn, Francesco Riva	2:09
15.	"The End Montage"	Cathleen Flynn	2:43
16.	"Jemma's Song"	Francesco Riva	3:08
17.	"Be All You Can Be"	Hilary Lambert	3:20
Total length:			59:51

== Reception ==
A critic from The Hollywood Reporter wrote that "But ultimately 37: A Final Promise proves as awkward as its ungainly title". A critic from Variety wrote that "Although it slyly teases its audience with hints of paranormal activity in the early going, “37: A Final Promise” gradually emerges an old-fashioned tearjerker set to a goth-rock soundtrack". A critic from The New York Times wrote that "The film announces at the beginning that it was “inspired by actual events,” but it feels manipulative more often than genuine". A critic from Los Angeles Times wrote that "Based in part on the story of author-life coach-stylist-musician Guy Blews, the film “37: A Final Promise” comes off as a paranormal and schizophrenic take on a Lifetime movie with themes of terminal illness and assisted suicide".
