= Harold Lipstein =

American cinematographer

- Born: June 14, 1898; Russia
- Died: October 8, 1974 (aged 76); California, U.S.
- Occupation: Cinematographer

Harold Lipstein (June 14, 1898 – October 8, 1974) was an American cinematographer. He was nominated for an Academy Award in the category Best Cinematography for the film A Man Called Peter.

== Selected filmography ==
- A Man Called Peter (1955)
