= Sally Jaye =

American folk singer-songwriter

- Singer/Songwriter Sally Jaye

Background information
- Born: Georgia
- Genres: Folk, americana, traditional
- Occupation(s): singer, songwriter
- Instrument(s): Voice, guitar, piano
- Website: www.sallyjaye.com

Sally Jaye is an American folk singer-songwriter who has recorded one major solo album, "Amarillo," but has also appeared on several other albums as a member of a group. She currently tours year round from coast to coast both as a solo artist and with the band Brian Wright And The Waco Tragedies.

== The band ==
Sally Jaye's band members include: Fil Krhonengold, Brian Allen, Josh Day, and Jason Cope. She also supplies supplementary vocals for Brian Wright And The Waco Tragedies. Though born in Georgia, and often going back to play local gigs, Sally currently plays most often in the Southern California area.

== Career ==
Sally grew up in Lawrenceville, Georgia where she studied piano, singing and acting. She studied at the Cincinnati Conservatory of Music, had a recurring role as a child actor in the TV series Christy, recorded an independent cd for the Atlanta area, and in 2000 joined the band Paper Sun. This was a rock band where Sally Jaye split the lead singing duties with artist Joel Eckels and briefly also with Krister Axel (who came on board for the Paper Sun release 'Humanity'). Sally left "Paper Sun" in 2005 and soon thereafter recorded her album Amarillo. Sally Jaye is a regular at The Hotel Café in Los Angeles, and Zoey's Cafe in Ventura and has been nominated for four 2009 Mavric awards.

== Recordings ==
Along with her 2006 release of Amarillo Sally Jaye has recorded songs with many prominent artists and bands. She has sung with Alan Friedman, Gabriel Mann, Jay Nash, Brian Wright, Bennett Cale Project, and Paper Sun, and has written songs for various film and television projects including an end credit title, "Grateful," for the film "If Only," starring Jennifer Love Hewitt and Tom Wilkinson. A live Gospel recording from late 2008 is being mastered for release in 2009 and another solo album is taking shape for later the same year.

== Discography ==
- Too Many Heartaches, Pt. 1 (2014)
- Amarillo (2006)

Sally Jaye has also appeared on the following albums -

- Humanity (2003)
- The Test of Time (2003)
- Good Things (2004)
- Some Kind Of Comfort (2005)
