= Bad Grandmas =

- United States release poster
- Directed by: Srikant Chellappa
- Written by: Srikant Chellappa; Jack Snyder
- Produced by: Chris Benson; Daniel Byington; Srikant Chellappa; Patrick Englert; Brian Jun; Kevin Charles Lewis; Jan Paul Miller
- Starring: Florence Henderson; Pam Grier; Judge Reinhold; Randall Batinkoff; Susie Wall; Sally Eaton
- Cinematography: Chris Benson
- Edited by: Patrick Lawrence; Jack Snyder
- Music by: Brandon Armstrong; Andy Bean
- Distributed by: WOWNOW Entertainment
- Release date: October 6, 2017
- Running time: 92 minutes
- Country: United States
- Language: English
- Box office: $17,688

Bad Grandmas is a 2017 American action comedy film directed by Srikant Chellappa starring Pam Grier, Judge Reinhold, Florence Henderson, and Randall Batinkoff. It is an independent film written by Chellappa and Jack Snyder. Filming took place in 2015, before veteran actress Florence Henderson's death in November of the following year. The film was released in late 2017.

== Plot ==
The comedy follows the activities of four grandmothers whose lives seem normal and unremarkable. After they accidentally kill a sleazy insurance agent, a con man whom the insurance agent owed money to comes looking for his money. Things go from bad to worse when the four grandmas go to work covering up the crime and trying to outwit the con man.

== Cast ==
- Florence Henderson as Mimi
- Pam Grier as Coralee
- Randall Batinkoff as Detective Randall McLemore
- Judge Reinhold as Harry (the con-man)
- Susie Wall as Bobbi
- Sally Eaton as Virginia
- Miriam Parrish as Ava
- David Wassilak as Jim
- Brian Jun as William
- Jilanne Klaus as Lisa
- Jason Allen Wolfe as Stan
- Daniel Byington as the store manager

== Production ==
The film was shot during 2015 in Columbia, Illinois and Fenton, Missouri At the end of filming, director Srikant Chellappa started a crowd-funding campaign to raise funds for post-production expenses, eventually raising $20,000.

=== Final film for Henderson ===
The film was veteran actress Florence Henderson's final starring role. The film's director stated in an interview with The Hollywood Reporter that he "...was looking for someone who had had a successful career but would play a different role that they were known for in the past." Saying that Henderson signed up for the right after being asked to play the main female character, he praised her professionalism on set as well as her ability to "...put everyone at ease. She took care of everyone on set, buying them food. She took all the PAs out to lunch. She loved spicy food and would always bring back Thai food for everyone." Henderson's character, "a pot-smoking grandmother turned ringleader of older women trying to outwit a conman" was noted as being the antithesis of what audiences were used to seeing from her. In an interview with Seth Ferranti for the online magazine Vice, co-star Pam Grier said of working with Henderson, "After work, we’d sit at the bar in the hotel and have dinner and share our past. It was just very comfortable. I wish she could have been around for a few more years."

== Release ==
The film had a Limited theatrical release on November 5, 2017, through December 10, 2017. The DVD was released on December 21, 2017, and the film became available for streaming on Amazon Video in 2018.

=== Critical reception ===
Bad Grandmas was generally panned by critics. Edward Douglas of Film Journal International wrote, "The embarrassment a few fine, august actors have to go through in the name of "comedy" is lost on a movie that never warrants a single laugh." Michael Rechtshaffen of the Los Angeles Times said the film was "An excruciatingly flat, forced Southern-fried farce about a bunch of old friends who have accidentally killed a man and must find a way to dispose of his body."

On Rotten Tomatoes, Bad Grandmas has 3 reviews, all negative.

=== Box office ===
The film took in $3,380 when it opened on November 5, 2017, grossing $17,688 for the entire run.
