= List of Mutant X episodes =

Mutant X is a science fiction television series that debuted on October 6, 2001. The show was created by Marvel Studios, and it centers on Mutant X, a team of "New Mutants" who possess extraordinary powers as a result of genetic engineering. Although it was said that a fourth season would be produced, it was canceled in 2004 after the dismantling of Fireworks Entertainment, one of the show's production companies, ending the show with an unsolved cliffhanger.

Mutant X follows the classic "Villain of the week" pattern. In nearly every episode a New Mutant appears which is later never seen of or heard from again. A continuing story arc appears only two times: the story arc revolving around Gabriel Ashlocke, which spans the final episode of the first season and the first several episodes of the second season and the second story arc revolving around The Dominion, a secret society, in the second half of the third season.

== Series overview ==
| Season | Episodes | Originally released | |
| Season | Episodes | First released | Last released |
|---|---|---|---|
| 1 | 22 | October 6, 2001 | July 6, 2002 |
| 2 | 22 | October 5, 2002 | May 12, 2003 |
| 3 | 22 | September 29, 2003 | May 17, 2004 |

== Episodes ==
=== Season 1 (2001–02) ===
The first season starts off with a two-part episode that introduces the main characters. Afterward, the episodes become stand-alone episodes. In nearly every episode a New Mutant appears, who Mutant X wants to help, while Genomex wants to capture this New Mutant. This work is often done by a special member of Genomex, who most times is also a New Mutant, who nearly always fails at the end of the episode and then vanishes to be never seen again. Although "Dancing on the Razor" aired after "A Breed Apart", the latter episode is the season finale episode.

| No. overall | No. in season | Title | Directed by | Written by | Original release date |
|---|---|---|---|---|---|
| 1 | 1 | "The Shock of the New" | T.J. Scott | Howard Chaykin | October 6, 2001 |
Emma DeLauro comes in contact with a secret group named Mutant X, which is a team of New Mutants formed and led by Adam Kane, a scientist who created the New Mutants. Meanwhile a secret agency, the GSA, led by Adam's old friend turned enemy Mason Eckhart, is created to deal with these New Mutants.
| 2 | 2 | "I Scream the Body Electric" | Jon Cassar | Howard Chaykin | October 13, 2001 |
A New Mutant named Brennan Mulwray is captured by the GSA and turned into one of their agents. He however betrays them and together with Emma joins Mutant X.
| 3 | 3 | "Russian Roulette" | T.J. Scott | Elizabeth Keyishian | October 20, 2001 |
While saving a New Mutant from two Russian bounty hunters who work for the GSA, Brennan is hit by a blast of an unknown weapon, which can kill him in a short time. Meanwhile, a New Mutant teenager wants to sell his father and step-sister, both New Mutants to Eckhart.
| 4 | 4 | "Fool for Love" | T.J. Scott | David Newman | October 27, 2001 |
While searching for a Feral New Mutant, Shalimar Fox meets another male Feral New Mutant and quickly falls in love with him. It turns out that he works for the GSA and used their material to create a "cure" for mutation.
| 5 | 5 | "Kilohertz" | Andrew Potter | David Newman | November 3, 2001 |
A New Mutant with the ability to control computers wreaks havoc in the country. Now both Mutant X and the GSA have to search for him before he can reveal the existence of New Mutants to the world.
| 6 | 6 | "The Meaning of Death" | Graeme Campbell | Brad Falchuk | November 10, 2001 |
A deadly plague causes New Mutants to lose control of their powers. Now both Mutant X and the GSA have to work together to find a cure. Jesse Kilmartin and Emma DeLauro were later infected with it as well.
| 7 | 7 | "Lit Fuse" | John Bell | Tom Fudge & Elizabeth Keyishian & David Newman | November 17, 2001 |
Adam leads the Mutant X team on a mission to protect Ashley Elliot, a New Mutant whose insatiable consumption of electricity is causing city-wide blackouts.
| 8 | 8 | "In the Presence of Mine Enemies" | John Bell | Howard Chaykin | November 24, 2001 |
Jesse Kilmartin is in love with Toni Quintana, a Psionic Telekinetic New Mutant expert in computer science. Eckhart decides to contact New Mutant the GS Agent, Kendra MacEvoy who possesses superhuman strength to kidnap Toni.
| 9 | 9 | "Crime of the New Century" | Graeme Campbell | Joe Johnson | December 1, 2001 |
Joshua Valentine, a New Mutant newly disclosed that possesses uncontrollable pyrokinetic abilities, is kidnapped in his own house. Adam knows that Joshua's mother is also a New Mutant.
| 10 | 10 | "Dark Star Rising" | Jon Cassar | Philip LaZebnik | January 19, 2002 |
Shalimar interferes three Feline Feral New Mutants trying to destroy Tricorp Botanicals. She tried to stop them, but they managed to escape. Back at Sanctuary, they were able to identify them: they are members of an international anti-terrorist organization called the Dark Star Unit fielded by Interpol who were all allegedly killed in a South American drug war fight two months ago in the jungles of Bogota.
| 11 | 11 | "Whiter Shade of Pale" | Terry Ingram | Tony Di Franco | January 26, 2002 |
A New Mutant able to live without sleeping is developing the Genetic Sequencer that is stolen by someone invisible. Adam traces it up to locating another New Mutant.
| 12 | 12 | "Double Vision" | Jon Cassar | Darrell Fetty | February 2, 2002 |
A former crime associate of Brennan, also New Mutant, leads Brennan and Emma to a trap arranged by agents of the GSA. This way, the New Mutant manages to develop new power. But due to a freak accident between this New Mutant and Brennan's powers colliding causes Emma's passive and aggressive aspects to be split into two people.
| 13 | 13 | "Blood Ties" | John Fawcett | Perry Dance | February 9, 2002 |
Jesse's estranged father obtains proof of the concealment of an accident related to New Mutants in a company that is actually a subsidiary of Genomex and tricks Jesse by leaving him with it. When the rest of the team learns that he plans to blackmail the head of the company or turn the information to the public, Jesse refuses to believe their story. Meanwhile, a New Mutant with hypersensitive hearing will be the manager of recovering the information for Genomex.
| 14 | 14 | "Altered Ego" | Andrew Potter | Elizabeth Keyishian | February 16, 2002 |
A New Mutant capable of infecting people by touching them with a toxin that alters their moral polarity makes appearance. She only affects other New Mutants for a minute, but with Non-New Mutants the toxin lasts permanently unless if she comes back and reverses it herself.
| 15 | 15 | "Lazarus Syndrome" | John Bell | Mark Amato | February 23, 2002 |
Emma and Brennan met an attractive New Mutant, Caleb Mathias. When he tries to absorb the vital energy of Emma, Brennan prevents it from happening. Soon, they discovered that Emma is not the first person attacked by Caleb.
| 16 | 16 | "Interface" | Ken Girotti | Mark Lisson | March 2, 2002 |
In a video in which shows the agents of the GSA capturing New Mutants in Mutant X's safehouses, Emma recognizes a friend from high school who could control computers with the mind that is working for the GSA.
| 17 | 17 | "Presumed Guilty" | Ken Girotti | Darrell Fetty | April 20, 2002 |
Adam is accused of a crime that he has not committed after knowing Mark Griffin, a New Mutant with the power of enhancing and erasing peoples' memories through his powerful memory absorbing gaze.
| 18 | 18 | "Ex Marks the Spot" | Jorge Montesi | Mark Amato & Howard Chaykin & David Newman | April 27, 2002 |
An ex-boyfriend of Shalimar, the New Mutant Zack Lockhart, joins Mutant X in a mission that leads them to trying to steal a genetic secret formula.
| 19 | 19 | "Nothing to Fear" | T.J. Scott | Elizabeth Keyishian | May 4, 2002 |
Shalimar and Brennan rescue a New Mutant who was being prosecuted by the GSA. In the pursuit, Shalimar turns out to be infected and submerges in a coma that shows her worst fear.
| 20 | 20 | "Deadly Desire" | Brad Turner | David Newman | May 11, 2002 |
The GSA track a scorpion-based Feral New Mutant, who kills one of its members in her escape, and infects other one, Carl Ames, with New Mutant pheromones which leaves him under her irresistible sexual control. Brennan is later infected as well.
| 21 | 21 | "Dancing on the Razor" | Jorge Montesi | Mark Amato | July 6, 2002 |
Mutant X, and the GSA are filmed using their powers and fighting skills by a disgraced reporter who wants to make his comeback by revealing them to the world. This way, Mutant X and the GSA have to work together to destroy the recording before this one goes out to the light and the existence of the New Mutants is discovered.
| 22 | 22 | "A Breed Apart" | Brad Turner | Howard Chaykin | May 18, 2002 |
Brennan and Shalimar interfere with a squadron of the GSA formed by New Mutants, but they have to move back when Brennan's power became uncontrollable and soon learn that all four of them are developing new powers. Meanwhile, a traitor in Genomex revives Patient Zero, Gabriel Ashlocke who is potentially the most deadliest and powerful New Mutant alive.

=== Season 2 (2002–03) ===
As shown at the end of season one, Genomex is defeated while Mason Eckhart is put into a stasis capsule. The main villain is now Gabriel Ashlocke, a powerful New Mutant who suffers from the fatal side effects of his mutations. Most of the first episodes of season two revolve around Ashlocke and his plans to cure himself from his deadly mutations. After he is killed, the next episodes are again stand-alone episodes which follows "The New Mutant of the Week" pattern.

| No. overall | No. in season | Title | Directed by | Written by | Original release date |
|---|---|---|---|---|---|
| 23 | 1 | "Past as Prologue" | T.J. Scott | Howard Chaykin | October 5, 2002 |
Ashlocke successfully revives an ancient Egyptian alchemist who possesses the power to cure him since his mutations will kill him. Mutant X tries to prevent this, but they are unsuccessful.
| 24 | 2 | "Power Play" | Milan Cheylov | Turi Meyer & Al Septien | October 12, 2002 |
Adam sends Brennan and Jesse to prevent a military official from stealing a laser defense system. Despite this, the mission fails and Jesse has an accident that destabilizes his molecular structure.
| 25 | 3 | "Time Squared" | John Bell | Elizabeth Keyishian | October 19, 2002 |
Mutant X chases Gabriel to a psychiatric hospital, but escapes traveling back in time to the year of 1978 where he tries to heal himself in his own ailment.
| 26 | 4 | "Whose Woods These Are" | Jorge Montesi | Darrell Fetty | October 26, 2002 |
Brennan and Shalimar investigate a series of deaths for which a New Mutant is seemingly responsible. Shortly later they face a cryptozoologist who is accompanied by a group of hunters.
| 27 | 5 | "The Future Revealed" | John Bell | Mark Amato & Peter Mohan | November 2, 2002 |
Gabriel manages to enter Sanctuary with his ally Kim, due to his Telepathic union with Shalimar. His proposal is to force Adam to heal him in his own ailment.
| 28 | 6 | "No Man Left Behind" | Jorge Montesi | David Newman | November 9, 2002 |
A military plane is knocked down in an enemy territory, Mutant X move up to the place of the accident to recover a stolen weapon from the government that was inside the vehicle.
| 29 | 7 | "Crossroads of the Soul" | Stacey Stewart Curtis | Mark Amato & Elizabeth Keyishian | November 16, 2002 |
When Brennan remains trapped inside an invisible city, which was founded by a man who hated the modern world, the rest of Mutant X must rescue him before he gets executed for a crime he did not commit by the man's descendant who wants to prevent the current population from learning of the modern world. Based on The Tempest.
| 30 | 8 | "Sign from Above" | John Bell | Tony Blake | November 23, 2002 |
Mutant X realize that they are being implacably chased by a group of aliens who want to capture specimens and take them with them out of the Earth.
| 31 | 9 | "Body and Soul" | Brenton Spencer | David Newman | November 30, 2002 |
A New Mutant is able to jump from body to another uses his powers to take revenge of Genomex and three scientists who experimented with him to prevent him from getting a normal life.
| 32 | 10 | "Understudy" | John Bell | Darrell Fetty | January 13, 2003 |
When Shalimar gets injured, Mutant X decides to replace her temporarily. The problems come when her replacement decides that she wants to remain in Mutant X permanently, and they are unaware that this replacement is behind Shalimar's injury in the first place.
| 33 | 11 | "The Grift" | Oley Sassone | Elizabeth Keyishian | January 20, 2003 |
An ex-girlfriend of Brennan, Becky Dolan comes to Mutant X asking for help, due to her being in danger after discovering a politician's darkest secrets. In addition, she has a surprise; she assures that Brennan is the father of her son, Connor.
| 34 | 12 | "At Destiny's End" | Oley Sassone | Jeff King | January 27, 2003 |
Emma infiltrates a group of ecoterrorists with being discovered by the chief of the group, who is a Psionic Precognitive.
| 35 | 13 | "Within These Walls" | Manfred Guthe | Peter Mohan | February 3, 2003 |
A New Mutant with the power to shoot photon daggers from both of his fingertips escapes from prison and goes after Adam seeking revenge.
| 36 | 14 | "Hard Time" | Oley Sassone | Turi Meyer & Al Septien | February 10, 2003 |
Jesse and Brennan go undercover to investigate a prison gladiatorial scheme. But despite Brennan not being conformable of having Jesse with him, due to his different background, he is infected with a drug that causes him to become more violent and out of control.
| 37 | 15 | "Under the Cloak of War" | Andrew Potter | Nelu Ghiran | February 17, 2003 |
Adam is the target of an assassination league. After their first failure, he sends Shalimar to infiltrate the group but the situation quickly becomes dangerous for her.
| 38 | 16 | "Once Around" | Bruce Pittman | Mark Amato | February 24, 2003 |
Mutant X must protect a defense witness against a New Mutant who can tune into the senses of others that he had touched.
| 39 | 17 | "Final Judgment" | Bill Corcoran | David Newman | April 7, 2003 |
Adam is put on trial by a mysterious group called the Tribunal for crimes against humanity.
| 40 | 18 | "Inferno" | Andrew Potter | Charles Heit | April 14, 2003 |
Mutant X tracks down a Pyromaniac New Mutant but matters are complicated when Emma is "possessed" by the spirit of his most recent victim, while Shalimar who felt useless earlier decides to work on fighting her natural fear of fire.
| 41 | 19 | "One Step Closer" | Bill Corcoran | Freddie Prinze, Jr. | April 21, 2003 |
Mutant X must protect a senator's daughter but Brennan's powers grew out of control, endangering the mission.
| 42 | 20 | "Reality Check" | Jorge Montesi | Story by : David Young; Teleplay by : Peter Mohan & Mark Amato | April 28, 2003 |
A New Mutant with the power to alter a person's reality, shattering their minds in the process sets out to locate Sanctuary, and captures Shalimar to do so.
| 43 | 21 | "Reawakening" | T. W. Peacocke | Mark Amato | May 5, 2003 |
Mutant X travels to an oil rig to find the Protocanth, a prehistoric humanoid creature believed to be extinct.
| 44 | 22 | "Lest He Become" | Jonathan Hackett | Peter Mohan | May 12, 2003 |
Shalimar learns that her father, Nicholas' company is involved in genetic testing and the person backing him, has plans of his own.

=== Season 3 (2003–04) ===
Season three sees several major cast changes. In the beginning of the first episode it is revealed that Emma is dead while Adam is also presumed dead, which later turns out to be false. A new fourth New Mutant, named Lexa Pierce, joins Mutant X. Mutant X now works for the secret society known as the Dominion, which forces them in most episodes to solve problems revolving around New Mutants or other genetic problems.

| No. overall | No. in season | Title | Directed by | Written by | Original release date |
|---|---|---|---|---|---|
| 45 | 1 | "Into the Moonless Night" | Philip Segal | Peter Mohan | September 29, 2003 |
In the aftermath of disaster, Mutant X find out that Emma is dead while Adam is missing, upon search they find out that Mason Eckhart has abducted Adam and Eckhart in exchange wants Adam's research to get his body in natural state. The team finds trouble unlocking Adam's files and a New Mutant, named Lexa Pierce steps in to help revealing that Adam's disappearance has stirred things up in the world of genetic research and that a lot of people are angry and in someways is able to convince the team that she's on their side. Eckhart reveals that Adam is dead, and steals the research and later abducts Brennan to find the codes and access to Sanctuary, but as he does, Mutant X comes to rescue and Mason is shot to death by an angry Brennan. The team lay over the past and Jesse discovers Lexa has plans of her own.
| 46 | 2 | "Wages of Sin" | Jorge Montesi | Bob Carney | October 6, 2003 |
A prion disease weapon is put up for an auction amongst the bio-terrorists, but Lexa's contact wants to keep that from happening and lets Mutant X work out the mission of getting them the weapon. The mission happens to be very challenging when they are all captured but with the weapon replaced by Shalimar they manage to escape but Lexa reveals to Jesse about a mysterious woman named Dominique who is known to be the greatest Genetic Engineer. Meanwhile as Dominique learns that weapon's missing she orders for a search against Mutant X.
| 47 | 3 | "The Breed" | Jorge Montesi | Michelle Lovretta | October 13, 2003 |
When Mutant X receives an SOS message from a mysterious source they go to is a military base that has become infected with a deadly disease. The team finds out that the scientist who created the virus was an acquaintance of Adam and has ulterior motives, regarding the infectious deadly virus.
| 48 | 4 | "Where Evil Dwells" | Andrew Potter | Bob Carney | October 20, 2003 |
Shalimar helps her friend, Andrea Marshall, who is also a Psionic to stop a serial killer who mimics the infamous puzzle killer and leaves clues to his next victims in the form of puzzles, though down the line when his next victim is revealed to be Shalimar, Mutant X finds out that Andrea's brain has been corrupted and she is the serial killer.
| 49 | 5 | "The Taking of Crows" | Bill Corcoran | Mark Amato | October 27, 2003 |
While on a night out, Lexa has been unknowingly drugged with a deadly substance that wreaks havoc on her powers. Lexa is eventually stabilized but the team soon learn that she is going to die in 72 hours unless a cure can be found. As such, Shalimar and Lexa go undercover, successfully getting arrested where they end up in a woman's prison meeting Dr. Sara Stanton who also happens to be the creator of the deadly drug Lexa was dosed with. But the mission is threatened when Stanton attempts to get her revenge against her boyfriend, Hector Friemark, who is the true mastermind behind the entire drug operation and who was also responsible for Stanton getting arrested while Shalimar and Jesse must pick up the pieces and get the necessary injection required to save Lexa's life when Lexa collapses and begins suffering seizures.
| 50 | 6 | "Shadows of Darkness" | Andrew Potter | Mark Amato | November 3, 2003 |
An acquaintance of Brennan, Dr. Victor Palance, who helped Brennan contemplate with his powers when he was young, calls Brennan to investigate bizarre deaths occurring at a local psychiatric hospital that has been reopened after a long while. Brennan discovers a New Mutant with power to create illusions is the one who has been killing the people and posing as ghost of one of the children, who had died in a fire long ago in that hospital.
| 51 | 7 | "The Hand of God" | Terry Ingram | Rick Drew | November 10, 2003 |
Lexa's contact set Mutant X on a mission to locate and capture a powerful New Mutant, named Kristoff, who possesses the power to take life and give life to someone else. But there is another group looking to capture him for themselves, and lets Mutant X into miseries that cost the life of Brennan and Shalimar but Kristoff heals Shalimar and takes the life of a framed person in his cult. Shalimar feels bad for Kristoff as he dies saving Brennan but soon takes life of a traitor to live again and Brennan learns what he means to Shalimar.
| 52 | 8 | "Wasteland" | René Bonnière | Turi Meyer & Al Septien | November 17, 2003 |
Jesse tries reconnect with his ex-fiancée, Alisha when the team learns that her company is involved in the genetic manipulation of crops, but it later turns out that Alisha's trusted executive was going behind her back to create genetically modified locusts to destroy other farm's crops to earn more money. Brennan and Shalimar with the help of a doctor from the Dominion find cure for the situation and Jesse reveals his secret to Alisha but even though she accepts him Jesse explains his new life to her and says they cannot be together so she tells him to not let go of true love again.
| 53 | 9 | "No Exit" | Bill Corcoran | Elizabeth Keyishian | January 12, 2004 |
A Tele-Cybernetic New Mutant plots to take revenge on Mutant X for putting his body in paralysis and uses his powers to takes over Sanctuary's security system, and locks Brennan and Jesse inside where as Shalimar and Lexa escape. When the Mutant leads Shalimar and Lexa into a trap she realizes who they are dealing with, Shalimar finds clues to locate the Mutant, and stops him before he could kill Jesse and Brennan.
| 54 | 10 | "Brother's Keeper" | Timothy Bond | Michelle Lovretta | January 19, 2004 |
When Shalimar discovers that Lexa is sneaking into her own missions, the team learns about Lexa's estranged twin brother, Leo Pierce, who has a multiple personality disorder, but as he is a New Mutant, who is able to shape shift into different personalities, as he becomes the main target of an underground operation harvesting New Mutant organs, Brennan helps Lexa in finding him meanwhile Jesse and Shalimar look into Leo's history. As Lexa finds him one of his aggressive personalities, Troy defeats Brennan and to save him she shoots Troy with a laser killing Leo as well.
| 55 | 11 | "Possibilities" | René Bonnière | Lisa Steele | January 26, 2004 |
Lexa gets information from the Dominion about a bomb that would take out an entire building. Brennan and a time-traveling New Mutant, named Samantha go through several alternate realities to defuse the bomb with help of Mutant X, but fail every time except in the last run, when Samantha sacrifices herself to let the mission succeed.
| 56 | 12 | "Conspiracy Theory" | Bill Corcoran | Peter Mohan | February 2, 2004 |
Brennan and Shalimar investigate a mystery of a secret group working while they find a person, who thinks that Mutants are aliens and everything including the GSA, Genomex and Adam Kane is a conspiracy meanwhile Lexa struggles to make a decision of continuing as a part of Mutant X or leaving it since her deal with the Dominion of finding her brother is over.
| 57 | 13 | "Art of Attraction" | Andrew Potter | Alfonse Ruggiero | February 9, 2004 |
Lexa's contact sets Mutant X to acquire a number of paintings that has immense importance and Shalimar is given vital information from a mysterious source. Lexa finds competition in a New Mutant, who has the power to manipulate energy while stealing the paintings, and teams with up him to get it and Jesse gets jealous, meanwhile Brennan and Shalimar investigate the mysterious voice and find out that the paintings contains clues to a formula of a new fuel source that can change economic powers in the world.
| 58 | 14 | "A Normal Life" | Alan Goluboff | Peter Mohan | February 16, 2004 |
A man, named Anthony Gervais has taken a few members of the Dominion Council hostage by putting them in state of suspended animation and is demanding a ransom to release them. Adam reveals to Shalimar that he is the mysterious voice and asks her to secretly save a scientist, who discovered the process of inflicting suspended animation. Shalimar goes rogue to save the scientist meanwhile Lexa and her contact learn that Shalimar has been receiving a communication from outside. The team eventually trusts Shalimar and with Adam's help the scientist discovers a cure for suspended animation and frees the hostages.
| 59 | 15 | "Divided Loyalties" | Richard Flower | David Wilks & Elizabeth Keyishian | February 23, 2004 |
Brennan is forced to return to his criminal past when Mutant X discovers that his old partner is involved in stealing secrets from the Dominion.
| 60 | 16 | "Age of Innocence" | Bill Corcoran | Mark Amato | April 5, 2004 |
Mutant X unearths an old military experiment involving an age-reversal serum and is surprised to discover that Jesse's grandfather is one of the test subjects.
| 61 | 17 | "She's Come Undone" | Timothy Bond | Michelle Lovretta | April 12, 2004 |
Discovering that their teammate Lexa is the subject of a covert experiment that is controlling her, Mutant X hunts for the doctor, who is responsible.
| 62 | 18 | "In Between" | Andrew Potter | Gil Grant | April 19, 2004 |
When Jesse's life hangs in the balance, Brennan must connect to him and lead him through past memories they have shared in order to save his life.
| 63 | 19 | "Dream Lover" | Bill Corcoran | Mark Amato | April 26, 2004 |
Mutant X must stop a rogue scientist from cloning women for use as slaves in his ultra-exclusive men's club.
| 64 | 20 | "The Prophecy" | Timothy Bond | Michelle Lovretta | May 3, 2004 |
Brennan battles with the Guardian of the Prophecy to stop the late New Mutant Ashlocke's plan from beyond the grave of world domination.
| 65 | 21 | "Cirque des Merveilles" | Jonathan Hackett | Mark Amato | May 10, 2004 |
Lexa's suspicions lead Mutant X to unveil a traveling death camp, which is posed as a circus for New Mutant refugees and Mutant X's enemy within the Dominion.
| 66 | 22 | "The Assault" | Andrew Potter | Peter Mohan | May 17, 2004 |
When the Dominion captures Lexa, Jesse and the rest of Mutant X rush to help her. Later, they learn, who the Creator really is, that he is generic template of Adam, who is his clone.
