= Lauren Lee Smith =

Canadian actress (born 1980)

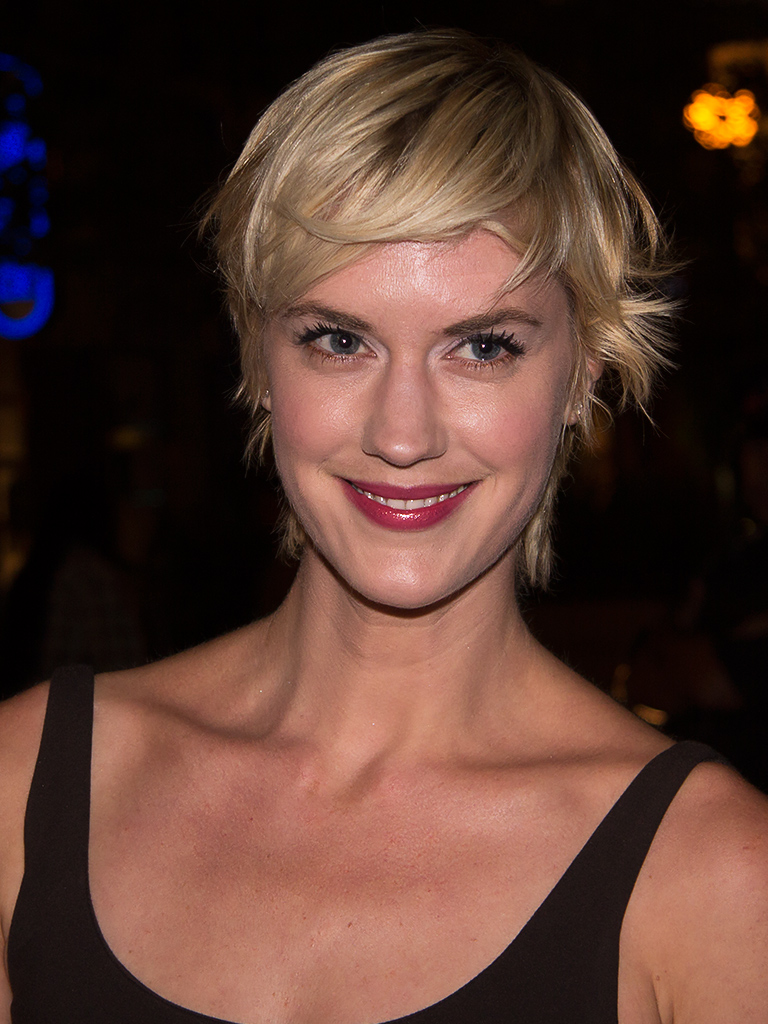
- Smith at the 2013 Toronto International Film Festival
- Born: June 19, 1980 (age 46); Vancouver, British Columbia, Canada
- Occupation: Actress
- Years active: 1997–present
- Spouse: Dillon Casey (m. 2024)
- Children: 1
- Relatives: Myles Ferguson (cousin)

Lauren Lee Smith (born June 19, 1980) is a Canadian actress. She is known for her television roles, including Emma DeLauro in the syndicated science fiction drama Mutant X, Riley Adams in the CBS forensics drama CSI: Crime Scene Investigation, police Sergeant Michelle McCluskey in the CTV fantasy drama The Listener and Frankie Drake in the CBC detective series Frankie Drake Mysteries.

== Early life ==
Smith was born in Vancouver, British Columbia, Canada. When she was 14, her family moved to Los Angeles, California. There, she began a modelling career.

== Career ==
At the age of 19, Smith was cast in the remake of Get Carter. Later that year, Smith was cast in the starring role of Christy Huddleston in the television film Christy: The Movie, and its follow-up two-part miniseries Christy, Choices of the Heart. She starred in the show Mutant X, where she played the character of Emma deLauro from 2001 to 2003.

Throughout the 2000s, she guest-starred in episodes of The Dead Zone, The Twilight Zone, and Blade: The Series, among others. Smith was also a recurring character in the Showtime drama series The L Word, playing sous chef Lara Perkins. In a 2005 change of pace, Smith filmed the sexually explicit movie Lie with Me, where she played the character of Leila. The same year, she was cast in the 2006 romance film The Last Kiss.

In 2006, she had a recurring part on the Canadian drama Intelligence. In early 2007, she played Kath in the CBC miniseries Dragon Boys. The same year, Smith was cast in starring roles in the 2008 thriller film Pathology, and in the 2009 drama film Helen with Ashley Judd.

In 2008, Smith became a series regular in the ninth season on the long-running CBS forensics drama CSI: Crime Scene Investigation playing Riley Adams (originally named Bryce Adams), "a smart, flirtatious, and witty non-conformist who entered law enforcement to rebel against her judgmental psychiatrist father", who joins Grissom's team, to fill the void left by the departure of Jorja Fox's Sara Sidle. She and her character did not return for the tenth season.

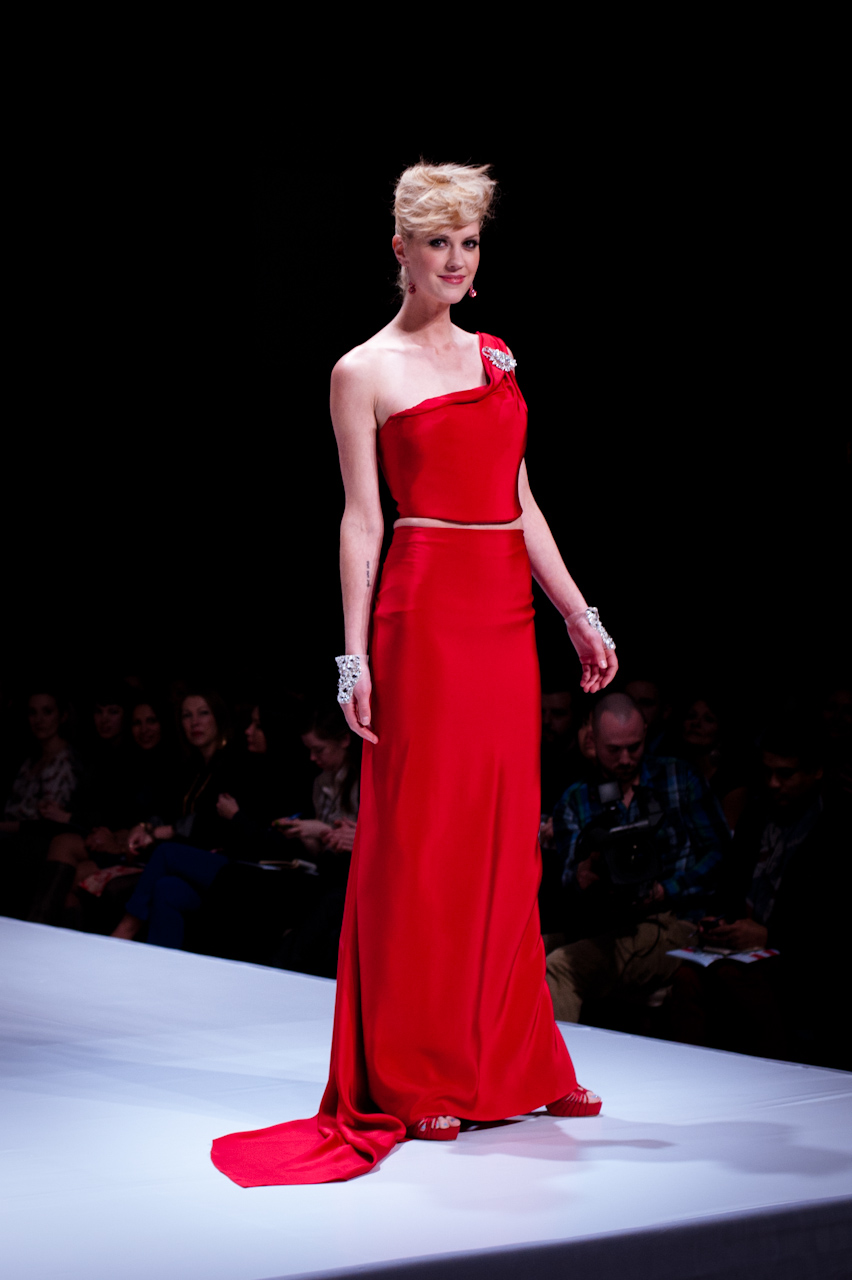
Smith at a fashion show in 2012

In 2009 Smith was cast in one of the lead roles in the German television film Hindenburg: The Last Flight by RTL, which aired in February 2011 in Germany and was broadcast by American premium channel Encore in March 2013. In 2010, Smith returned to Canada and joined the cast of the CTV drama series The Listener for its second season.

In 2012, she was cast in the starring role of Grace in the 2013 Canadian comedy film Cinemanovels alongside Jennifer Beals, with whom Smith had previously appeared in The L Word and the 2010 film A Night for Dying Tigers.

In 2014, Smith played government investigator Samantha Krueger on the CBC/Syfy science-fiction miniseries Ascension. In 2015, Smith joined the cast of the CBC drama series This Life, playing Maggie, the sister of the lead character (Torri Higginson) who is suffering from stage four cancer; Smith's portrayal of the character was well received by The Globe and Mail's John Doyle.

In 2017, she was cast in the lead role in the CBC drama series Frankie Drake Mysteries. The series ran for four seasons, and received generally positive reviews from critics. The Globe and Mail wrote that Smith played the role "with glorious oomph".

== Personal life ==
She has been married to actor Dillon Casey since 2024. She has one daughter born in 2016.

== Filmography ==
=== Film ===
Year	Title	Role	Notes
2000	Get Carter	Girl #2	
2005	Lie with Me	Leila	
2006	Art School Confidential	Beat Girl	
2006	The Last Kiss	Lisa	
2006	One Way	Angelina Sable	
2007	Normal	Sherri	
2007	Late Fragment	Lea	
2007	Trick 'r Treat	Danielle	
2008	Pathology	Juliette Bath	
2008	An American Carol	Voice of Reason	
2009	Helen	Mathilda	
2010	A Night for Dying Tigers	Karen	
2011	Girl Walks into a Bar	Karen	
2012	Three Days in Havana	Grace	
2013	Hunting Season	Samantha	
2013	Cinemanovels	Grace	
2014	If I Stay	Willow	
2015	How to Plan an Orgy in a Small Town	Heather Mitchell	
2017	The Shape of Water	Elaine	
2025	Steal Away	Florence	

=== Television ===
Year	Title	Role	Notes
1997	Beyond Belief: Fact or Fiction	Michelle Lambert	Episode: "Murder of Roy Hennessey"
2000	Homewood P.I.	N/A	Unsold television pilot
2000	Dark Angel	Natalie	Episode: Pilot
2000	2gether	Erin	Television film (MTV)
2000	2gether: The Series	Erin Evans	Recurring role, 11 episodes
2000	Christy: The Movie	Christy Huddleston	Television film (Pax); aka. Christy: Return to Cutter Gap
2001	Christy, Choices of the Heart	Christy Huddleston	Television miniseries (Pax) (Note: Also known as Christy: A Change of Seasons (i.e. Part I) and Christy: A New Beginning (i.e. Part II).)
2001	The Wedding Dress	Hannah Pinkham	Television film
2001–2003	Mutant X	Emma DeLauro	Main role (seasons 1–2)
2003	The Twilight Zone	Eve	Episode: "Sunrise"
2004	I Want to Marry Ryan Banks	Lauren	Television film
2004	The Survivors Club	Meg Pesaturo	Television film
2004	The Dead Zone	Bonnie Gibson	Episode: "Total Awareness"
2004–2006	The L Word	Lara Perkins	Recurring role, 20 episodes
2006	Blade: The Series	Bethany	Episode: "Hunters"
2006–2007	Intelligence	Tina	Recurring role, 10 episodes
2007	Dragon Boys	Kath	Television miniseries
2008–2009	CSI: Crime Scene Investigation	Riley Adams	Main role (season 9)
2009	Anatomy of Hope	Cynthia Morgan	Unsold television pilot
2009	Can Openers	Susan	Unsold television pilot
2009	CSI: Deadly Intent	Riley Adams	Video game; voice role
2010	Psych	Lillian	Episode: "Feet Don't Kill Me Now"
2011	Hindenburg: The Last Flight	Jennifer van Zandt	Television film
2011	Good Dog	Claire	Main role
2011–2014	The Listener	Michelle McCluskey	Main role (seasons 2–5)
2012	Good God	Claire	Episode: "One Station Under God"
2012	Ring of Fire	Emily Booth	Unsold television pilot
2014	Murdoch Mysteries	Elva Gordon	Episode: "Journey to the Centre of Toronto"
2014	Saving Hope	Astrid Ray	Episode: "The Other Side of Midnight"
2014	Ascension	Samantha Krueger	Television miniseries (SyFy)
2015–2016	This Life	Maggie Lawson	Main role; 20 episodes
2017–2021	Frankie Drake Mysteries	Frankie Drake	Lead role
2019	Hudson and Rex	Gabrielle Bullock	Episode: "S1, Ep. 8, Fast Eddie's, "
2021	The Wedding Ring	Kate Sterling	Television film (UPTV)
2021	Doomsday Mom: The Lori Vallow Story	Lori Vallow	Television film (Lifetime)
2022	Departure	Linda Halley	4 episodes (season 3)
2026	Skymed	Captain Riley	Season 4

== Accolades ==
Year	Award	Category	Work	Result	Refs
2002	Gemini Awards	Best Performance by an Actress in a Featured Supporting Role in a Dramatic Series	Mutant X	Nominated	
2008	Leo Awards	Best Supporting Performance by a Female in a Feature Length Drama	Normal	Nominated	
2009	Leo Awards	Best Supporting Performance by a Female in a Feature Length Drama	Helen	Won	
2011	Gemini Awards	Best Performance by an Actress in a Continuing Leading Dramatic Role	The Listener	Nominated	
2011	Leo Awards	Best Lead Performance by a Female in a Feature Length Drama	A Night for Dying Tigers	Nominated	
2014	Leo Awards	Best Lead Performance by a Female in a Feature Length Drama	Cinemanovels	Won	
2016	Leo Awards	Best Supporting Performance by a Female in a Dramatic Series	This Life	Won	
2017	Canadian Screen Awards	Best Performance by an Actress in a Featured Supporting Role in a Dramatic Program or Series	This Life	Nominated	
2017	Leo Awards	Best Supporting Performance by a Female in a Dramatic Series	This Life	Nominated	
