= Great Smoky Mountains Heritage Center =

Museum in Tennessee

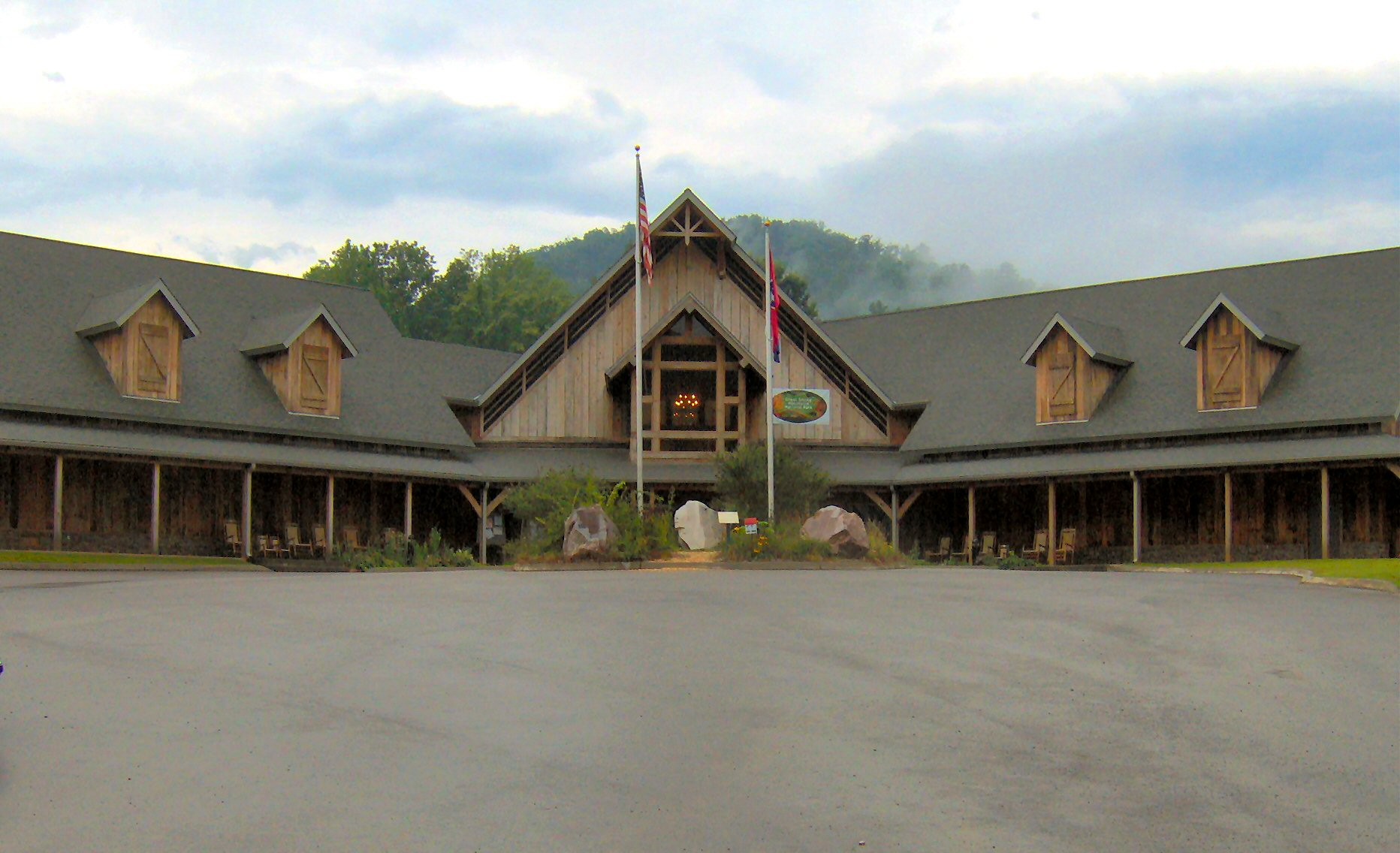
- Established: 2006
- Location: 123 Cromwell Drive, Townsend, Tennessee, United States
- Coordinates: 35°40′36″N 83°43′20″W
- Directors: Francis Graffeo, CEO
- Website: gsmheritagecenter.org

The Great Smoky Mountains Heritage Center is a private non-profit museum located in Townsend, Tennessee, United States, near the city's entrance to the Great Smoky Mountains National Park. Its mission is to preserve the heritage and culture of the inhabitants of the Great Smoky Mountains, including both the region's Native American inhabitants and the pioneers and residents of the region's Appalachian communities. The center was organized in the early 2000s, and officially opened in February 2006.

The center houses over 17,000 square feet (1,600 m^{2}) of indoor and outdoor exhibits. The outdoor area includes several structures from around the region, including a log cabin, two cantilever barns, an AME Zion chapel, a logging town "setoff" house, a sawmill, and a still once operated by a local moonshiner. The indoor gallery displays tools, furniture and musical instruments used in the mountain region, as well as a sizable collection of Cherokee and other Native American artifacts, some dating to the Archaic period (c. 8000–2000 B.C.).

== History ==
The Great Smoky Mountains Heritage Center was conceptualized in the early 2000s by local preservationist and antique collector Richard Way. Early organizational efforts were led by Bob Patterson and several Townsend-area civic organizations. The Great Smoky Mountains Heritage Center Guild hosted fundraisers for the proposed center in 2004 and 2005. Ground for the new center was broken in the Summer of 2004. The center officially opened February 12, 2006.

Early displays included Cherokee artifacts and masks representing the seven Cherokee clans, and tools and vehicles used by early pioneers and mountaineers. A mountain medicine exhibit displayed bags and equipment used by Dr. Granville Dexter LeQuire, who practiced in the rural parts of the region during the first half of the 20th century. The center's "Tennessee on the Move" gallery included a small car with a video screen that gave visitors the experience of driving on a mountain road in 1925. The center's outdoor displays included the Cardwell Cabin, an 1890s-era hewn log cabin donated to the center by Gatlinburg resident Wilma Maples, one of the center's benefactors.

In 2008, a moonshine still built and operated by Townsend-area resident Charlie Williams (1908–1992) was donated to the center by Williams' son, Mike. In 2010, the Wilders Cemetery Association donated the 100-year-old meeting house of the Wilders Chapel AME Zion Church, which had stood on Amerine Road in Maryville since 1910.

The center reported over 75,000 visitors during its first three years of operation. In 2010, the center announced plans to build a new climate-controlled facility to house additional displays and artifacts. In 2011, the Tennessee Association of Museums presented the center and its organizers with three Awards of Excellence.

== Collections ==
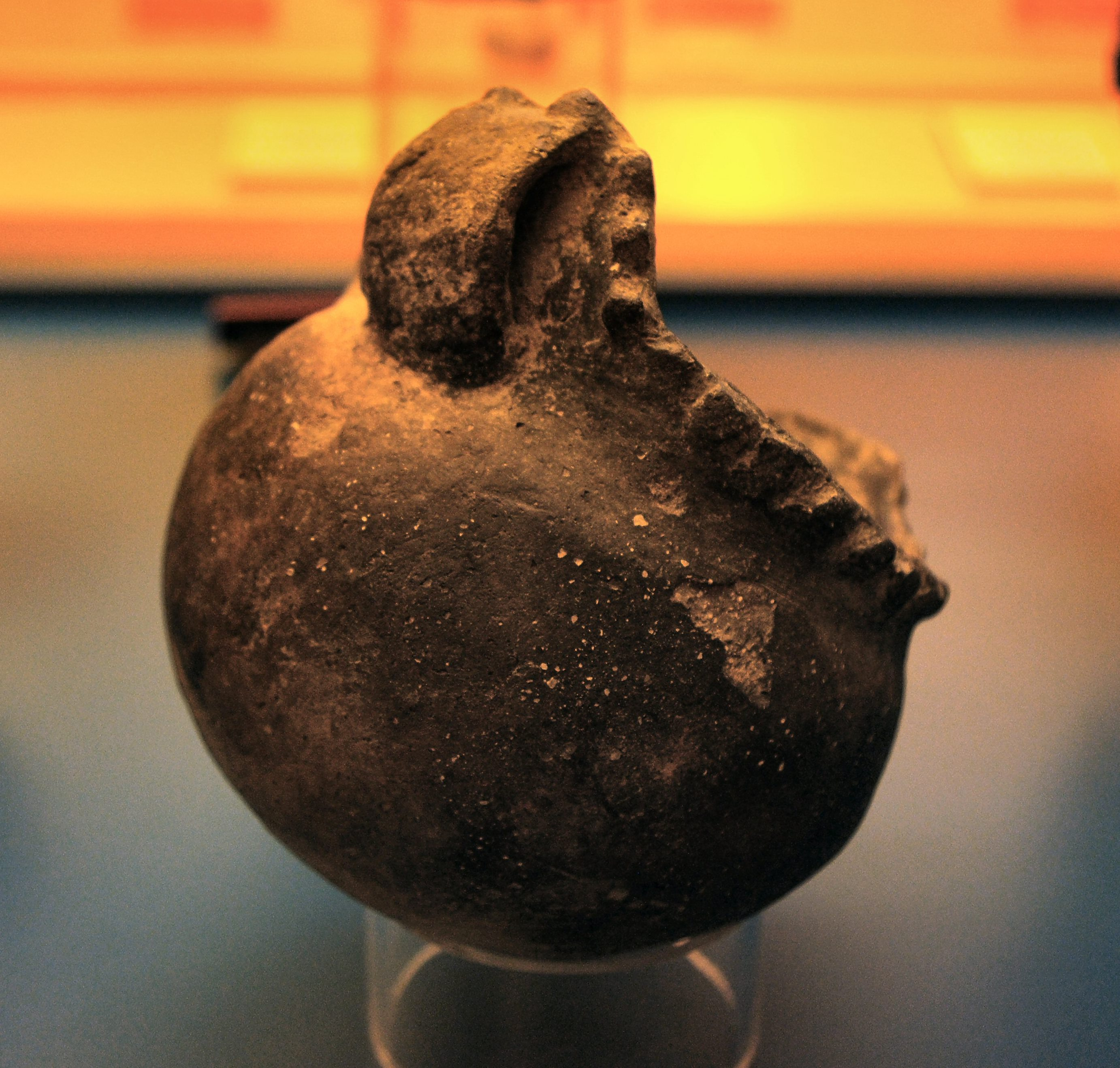
Mississippian-period jar on display in the main gallery

Along with its outdoor exhibits, the Great Smoky Mountains Heritage Center has two indoor galleries: the main gallery and the transportation gallery. Half of the main gallery is dedicated to the region's Native American history, and the other to the region's pioneer and mountaineer periods. The center's transportation gallery interprets the region's evolving types of transportation, from wagons to railroads and automobiles. The center also includes a 100-seat auditorium and a 500-seat amphitheater.

Along with the Cardwell Cabin, Wilders Chapel, and Williams still, the outdoor section consists of nearly a dozen structures from around the region, many of which are decorated with furniture, tools, and other items from their respective periods. The Montvale Station represents a stagecoach stop that once stood in the nearby late-19th century resort of Montvale Springs. The center is home to two cantilever barns, a type of barn commonly used by farmers in East Tennessee, as well as a smokehouse and granary, which were once common on rural farms. The "setoff" house on display is a type of home commonly found in late-19th century logging towns, such as nearby Tremont and Elkmont.

The main gallery's Native American section contains artifacts dating from the Archaic (8000–2000 B.C.), Woodland (1000 B.C. – 1000 A.D.), and Mississippian (1000–1600 A.D.) periods, as well as from the historic Cherokee period. Many of the artifacts on display were uncovered during the Townsend Archaeological Project, which was conducted just up the road from 1999 to 2001. The pioneer gallery includes late-19th and early-20th century items commonly used in rural areas around the region, including a bedroom suite, and tools such as a horseshoeing box and a banjo once played by a resident of Cades Cove.

The Proffitt's Gallery, at the end of the center's main gallery, hosts traveling and temporary exhibits. These have included an exhibit showcasing items once sold by the Alcoa-based department store, Proffitt's, a collection of Civil War memorabilia to honor the war's sesquicentennial, an exhibition of old toys, and an exhibit dedicated to Great Smoky Mountains National Park promoters and conservationists, Horace Kephart and Harvey Broome.

=== Comprehensive list of historical structures ===
| Structure | Image | Constructed | Original location | Builder/principal owner |
|---|---|---|---|---|
| Cardwell Cabin | | 1892–1895 | Sevier County, Tennessee | James Andrew Cardwell |
| Outhouse | | | | |
| Smokehouse | | | | |
| Cantilever barn | | | | |
| Williams moonshine still | | 1960 | Townsend, Tennessee | Charlie Williams |
| Wilders Chapel A.M.E Zion Church | | 1910 | Maryville, Tennessee | |
| Montvale Station | | | Montvale Springs, Tennessee | |
| Long granary | | 1890s | Loudon County, Tennessee | Isaac Long |
| Long cantilever barn | | 1886 (appx.) | Loudon County, Tennessee | Isaac Long |
| Wheelwright shop | | | | |
| Sawmill | | 1885 (appx.) | | |
| Setoff house | | | | |

== See also ==
- Museum of Appalachia
