= Stewart Finlay-McLennan =

Australian actor

- Born: 7 September 1957 (age 69); Broken Hill, New South Wales, Australia
- Other names: Stewart McLennan, Stuart McLennan
- Education: Charles Sturt University
- Occupation: Actor
- Years active: 1986–2015

Stewart Finlay-McLennan (born 7 September 1957) is an Australian actor.

Finlay-McLennan was born and raised in Broken Hill. He earned a degree from Charles Sturt University in Bathurst, New South Wales, where he majored in Art and Drama.

Finlay-McLennan made his television debut in an episode of Jake and the Fatman in 1989. From 1994 to 1995, he played Dr. Neil MacNeill on the CBS television series, Christy. He appeared in National Treasure and the first season of Six Feet Under. He later appeared in The Last Sin Eater and Prep School.

Finlay-McLennan appeared in a TV commercial for Outback Steakhouse in 2000 and Down an Alley Filled with Cats on Broadway.

Finlay-McLennan has retired from acting.

== Filmography ==
Year	Title	Role	Notes
1993	Aspen Extreme	Rudy Zucker	
1993-1995	Christy	Dr. Neil MacNeill	tv series
1998	Spoiler	Lory	
1998	The Survivor	Benter	
2004	The Alamo	James Grant	
2004	Monk	Ian Blackburn	Episode: "Mr. Monk and the Panic Room"
2004	National Treasure	Powell	
2006	Jane Doe: The Harder They Fall	Tom Shaunessy	tv film
2007	The Last Sin Eater	Brogan Kai	
2015	Prep School	Coach Winters	
