= Christy (novel) =

1967 novel by Catherine Marshall

- First edition
- Author: Catherine Marshall
- Language: English
- Genre: Historical fiction
- Publisher: McGraw Hill
- Publication date: October 9, 1967
- Publication place: United States
- Media type: Print
- Pages: 498 (first edition)
- ISBN: 0-310-24163-4 (paperback edition) (Zondervan)

Christy is a 1967 historical fiction Christian novel by American author Catherine Marshall, set in the fictional Appalachian village of Cutter Gap, Tennessee, in 1912. The novel was inspired by the work of Marshall's mother, Leonora Whitaker, who taught impoverished children in the Appalachian region when she was a young, single woman. The novel explores faith, and mountain traditions such as moonshining, folk beliefs, and folk medicine.

Marshall made notes for a sequel, but she never completed it. These were found by her family some 34 years later. Christianity Today ranked Christy as 27th on a list of the 50 books (post-World War II) that had most shaped evangelicals' minds, after surveying "dozens of evangelical leaders" for their nominations. The novel was adapted for a TV series of the same name, which was aired in 1994 and 1995.

== Plot ==
While attending a 1912 Christian revival meeting, 19-year-old Christy Huddleson is fascinated to learn about an Appalachian mission program when the founder describes the work his group is doing and the needs of the Cutter Gap community. Christy, the daughter of a well-to-do family in Asheville, North Carolina, is drawn to the idea of volunteering to teach the needy Cutter Gap students. Her parents are initially reluctant, but she persists and soon travels to the remote area in eastern Tennessee.

From her first day in the Appalachians, she is challenged by the primitive conditions and the folk medicine beliefs of the mountain people. Her mentor at the mission, a Quaker named Alice Henderson, encourages her to notice also the beauty in the community and people, and to help preserve the best of the Appalachians in ways that will help the locals to become self-sustaining. Christy and her co-worker, minister David Grantland, try to educate local students. They also try to teach their neighbors an alternative to the family feuding and cycle of revenge that have been a tradition for decades. Local physician Neill MacNeill is an agnostic who grew up in the mountains; he seeks to make Christy more sympathetic to locals' concerns and traditions.

Plot threads include Christy's experiences in the school house and her burgeoning friendships with local women, David's challenges in reaching a community that views him as an interfering outsider, family feuds, moonshiners who use schoolchildren as workers, and questions of faith. As Christy becomes better acquainted with MacNeill and Miss Alice, she discovers that the physician's late wife was Miss Alice's daughter (conceived when a predatory visiting minister raped Alice as a young woman). She learns that the physician's agnosticism was partly a reaction to the apparent injustice of his wife's death. Christy's faith is tried by these and other revelations, at the same time that she is romantically drawn both to the minister and the physician.

=== Allusions to history, geography, and science ===
The fictional village of Cutter Gap is based on a community centered on the Chapel Hollow in the small Morgan Branch valley (NOT to be confused with Morgan Branch), a few miles west of Del Rio in Cocke County, Tennessee. Local landmarks associated with the story are marked for visitors, including the site of the Ebenezer Mission in Chapel Hollow.

At a women's society meeting where Christy was giving a talk regarding the plight of those living in Cutter Gap, a woman shares with her information regarding the Danish folk high school folk schools established by Grundtvig, in which adults learned to use traditional folkways and crafts to become self-sustaining.

A wholly fictional MacNeill performs trepanation on an accident victim and studies trachoma in the local population. Several characters suffer from typhoid fever. The physician and others work to teach better hygiene to the local population to prevent the disease. MacNeill lectures Christy on the origins of moonshining and the reasons why many locals — including MacNeill — consider its prohibition to be an unfair block to their earning money from their crops. Christy eventually marries the physician.

Catherine Marshall, the widow of Dr. Peter Marshall when she wrote the book, has been quoted as saying the book was about 75% historical. The main characters (the physician) and mountain woman descended from ancient royalty, are fictionalized. Catherine Marshall's mother, the model for Christy, married a minister. A detailed comparison between aspects of the novel and the history is detailed in the essay Christy and Leonora: City Girl, Country Gal.

== Film, TV, or theatrical adaptations ==
Christy was adapted as a TV movie and television series in 1994. The week after the movie and program debuted, the novel jumped from number 120 up to number 15 on the USA Today bestseller list. Together, the novel and the TV series inspired ChristyFest, an annual celebration in Townsend, Tennessee, from 1999 to 2018.
