= Catherine Marshall =

American novelist (1914–1983)

- Born: Catherine Sarah Wood Marshall; September 27, 1914; Johnson City, Tennessee, United States
- Died: March 18, 1983 (aged 68)
- Education: Agnes Scott College
- Occupation: Author
- Spouse(s): Peter Marshall, m. 1936–1949, his death Leonard LeSourd m. 1959- till her death in 1983
- Writing career
- Period: 1951–83
- Notable works: Christy (1967), A Man Called Peter (1955)

Catherine Sarah Wood Marshall LeSourd (September 27, 1914 – March 18, 1983) was an American author of nonfiction, inspirational, and fiction works. She was the wife of well-known minister Peter Marshall.

== Biography ==
Marshall was born in Johnson City, Tennessee in 1914. She was the daughter of the Reverend John Ambrose Wood and Leonora Whitaker Wood. From the age of nine until her graduation from high school, Marshall was raised in Keyser, West Virginia, where her father served as pastor of a Presbyterian church from 1924 to 1942.

While a junior at Agnes Scott College, she met Peter Marshall, marrying him in 1936. The couple moved to Washington, D.C., where her husband served as pastor of the New York Avenue Presbyterian Church and Chaplain of the United States Senate.

In 1940, Marshall contracted tuberculosis, for which at that time no antibiotic treatment was available. She spent nearly three years recovering from the illness. Her husband died in 1949 of a heart attack, leaving her to care for their nine-year-old son, Peter John Marshall. He later also became a minister and author.

Marshall wrote a biography of her husband, A Man Called Peter, published in 1951. It became a nationwide success and was adapted as a film of the same name, released in 1955. Her success encouraged her to keep writing.

Marshall appeared as a contestant on the CBS television program, I've Got a Secret, on the March 30, 1955 episode.

Marshall wrote or edited more than 30 books, which have sold over 16 million copies. They include edited collections of Peter Marshall's sermons and prayers, and her own inspirational writings. Her most successful books were A Man Called Peter (1951); and her novel, Christy (1967), which was inspired by the story of her mother's time in the mountains teaching the impoverished children of Appalachia. Christy was adapted as a CBS television series, starring Kellie Martin, beginning in 1994.

In 1959, Marshall married Leonard LeSourd, who was the editor of Guideposts Magazine for 28 years. Together they founded a book imprint, Chosen Books. Marshall had three stepchildren, Linda, Chester and Jeffery.

Marshall died of heart failure at the age of 68 in 1983. She was buried alongside her first husband.

== Works published ==
- A Closer Walk (co-author)
- A Man Called Peter
- Adventures in Prayer
- Beyond Our Selves
- Catherine Marshall's Story Bible
- Catherine Marshall's Storybook for Children
- Christy
- Footprints in the Snow
- Friends with God
- God Loves You
- Heart of Peter Marshall's Faith
- John Doe, Disciple
- Julie
- Let's Keep Christmas
- Light in my Darkest Night
- Meeting God at Every Turn
- Mr. Jones, Meet the Master (co-author)
- Moments that Matter
- My Personal Prayer Diary
- Prayers of Peter Marshall
- Quiet Times with Catherine Marshall
- Something More
- The Best of Catherine Marshall
- The Best of Peter Marshall
- The Collected Works of Catherine Marshall
- The First Easter (co-author)
- The Helper
- The Inspirational Writings of Catherine Marshall
- To Live Again
