= List of members of the United States Congress who died in office (1790–1899) =

The following is a list of United States senators and representatives who died of natural or accidental causes, or who killed themselves, while serving their terms between 1790 and 1899. For a list of members of Congress who were killed while in office, see List of members of the United States Congress killed or wounded in office.

Member	Party	State (district)	Date of death	Age at death (years)	Cause	Place of death	Place of burial	Successor	Serving since (in the House/Senate)	Date of birth	Place of birth	U.S. Congress
William Grayson	Federalist	Virginia (Senator)	March 12, 1790	49/50	Gout	Dumfries, Virginia	Grayson Family Vault, Belle Aire, Virginia	John Walker	March 4, 1789	Sometime in 1740	Prince William County, Virginia	1st
Theodorick Bland	Federalist	Virginia (9th district)	June 1, 1790	49	"influenza united with the effects & remains of previous indisposition"	New York City, New York	Congressional Cemetery, Washington, D.C.	William B. Giles	March 4, 1789	March 21, 1741	Prince George County, Virginia	1st
Roger Sherman	Federalist	Connecticut (Senator)	July 23, 1793	72	Typhoid fever	New Haven, Connecticut	Grove Street Cemetery, New Haven, Connecticut	Stephen M. Mitchell	June 13, 1791 (U.S. House tenure March 4, 1789 – March 3, 1791)	April 19, 1721	Newton, Massachusetts	3rd
Abraham Clark	Federalist	New Jersey (at-large)	September 15, 1794	68	Sunstroke	New Jersey	Rahway Cemetery, New Jersey	Aaron Kitchell	March 4, 1791	February 15, 1726	Elizabethtown, New Jersey	3rd
Alexander Gillon	Federalist	South Carolina (5th district)	October 6, 1794	52/53	Unknown	Orangeburg District, South Carolina	Orangeburg County, South Carolina	Robert G. Harper	March 4, 1793	Sometime in 1741	Rotterdam, Dutch Republic	3rd
James Davenport	Federalist	Connecticut (at-large)	August 3, 1797	38	Unknown	Stamford, Connecticut	Northfield Cemetery, Stamford, Connecticut	Samuel W. Dana	December 5, 1796	October 12, 1758	Stamford, Connecticut	5th
Nathan Bryan	Democratic-Republican	North Carolina (10th district)	June 4, 1798	49/50	Unknown	Philadelphia, Pennsylvania	Congressional Cemetery, Washington, D.C.	Richard D. Spaight	March 4, 1795	Sometime in 1748	Craven County, North Carolina	5th
John Swanwick	Democratic-Republican	Pennsylvania (1st district)	July 31, 1798	57/58	Yellow fever	Philadelphia, Pennsylvania	Saint Peter's Episcopal Churchyard, Philadelphia, Pennsylvania	Robert Waln	March 4, 1795	Sometime in 1740	Liverpool, England	5th
Joshua Clayton	Federalist	Delaware (Senator)	August 11, 1798	54	Yellow fever	New Castle County, Delaware	Bethel Church Cemetery, Chesapeake City, Maryland	William H. Wells	January 19, 1798	July 20, 1744	Wyoming, Delaware	5th
Joshua Coit	Federalist	Connecticut (at-large)	September 5, 1798	39	Yellow fever	New London, Connecticut	Cedar Grove Cemetery, New London, Connecticut	Zephaniah Swift	March 4, 1793	October 7, 1758	New London, Connecticut	5th
Henry Tazewell	Federalist	Virginia (Senator)	January 24, 1799	45	Unknown	Philadelphia, Pennsylvania	Saint Peter's Episcopal Churchyard, Philadelphia, Pennsylvania	Wilson C. Nicholas	December 29, 1794	November 27, 1753	Brunswick County, Virginia	5th
Jonathan Nicoll Havens	Democratic-Republican	New York (1st district)	October 25, 1799	42	Unknown	Shelter Island, Suffolk County, New York	Presbyterian Church Burial Ground, Shelter Island, Suffolk County, New York	John Smith	March 4, 1795	June 18, 1757	Shelter Island, New York	6th
Thomas Hartley	Federalist	Pennsylvania (8th district)	December 21, 1800	52	Unknown	York, Pennsylvania	St. John's Churchyard, York, Pennsylvania	John Stewart	March 4, 1789	September 7, 1748	Colebrookdale Township, Berks County, Pennsylvania	6th
James Jones	Federalist	Georgia (at-large)	January 11, 1801	31/32	Unknown	Washington D.C.	Congressional Cemetery, Washington, D.C.	John Milledge	March 4, 1799	Sometime in 1769	Maryland	6th
Narsworthy Hunter	Federalist	Mississippi (Delegate)	March 11, 1802	45/46	Unknown	Washington D.C.	Congressional Cemetery, Washington, D.C.	William Lattimore	December 7, 1801	1756	Virginia	7th
Charles Johnson	Democratic-Republican	North Carolina (8th district)	July 23, 1802	49/50	Unknown	Bandon, North Carolina	Edenton Cemetery, Edenton, North Carolina	Thomas Wynns	March 4, 1801	Sometime in 1752	Scotland	7th
John Ewing Colhoun	Democratic-Republican	South Carolina (Senator)	October 26, 1802	52/53	Unknown	Pendleton, South Carolina	Family cemetery in Pickens County, South Carolina	Pierce Butler	March 4, 1801	Sometime in 1749	Staunton, Virginia	7th
Isaac Bloom	Democratic-Republican	New York (6th district)	April 26, 1803	54	Unknown	Poughkeepsie, New York	Pittsbury Presbyterian Churchyard, Washington Hollow, New York	Daniel C. Verplanck	March 4, 1803	Sometime in 1748	Jamaica, Queens County, New York	8th
Stevens T. Mason	Democratic-Republican	Virginia (Senator)	May 10, 1803	42	Unknown	Philadelphia, Pennsylvania	Family burying ground at Raspberry Plain in Loudoun County, Virginia	John Taylor	November 18, 1794	December 29, 1760	Chopawamsic, Stafford County, Virginia	8th
Daniel Hiester	Democratic-Republican	Maryland (4th district)	March 7, 1804	56	Unknown	Washington D.C.	Zion Reformed Graveyard, Hagerstown, Maryland	Roger Nelson	March 4, 1801 (previously served March 4, 1789 – July 1, 1796)	June 25, 1747	Berks County, Pennsylvania	8th
John Johns Trigg	Democratic-Republican	Virginia (13th district)	May 17, 1804	55/56	Unknown	Bedford County, Virginia	Bedford County, Virginia	Christopher H. Clark	March 4, 1797	Sometime in 1748	Bedford County, Virginia	8th
Samuel J. Potter	Democratic-Republican	Rhode Island (Senator)	October 14, 1804	51	Unknown	Washington, D.C.	Kingston, Rhode Island	Benjamin Howland	March 4, 1803	June 29, 1753	South Kingstown, Rhode Island	8th
James Gillespie	Democratic-Republican	North Carolina (5th district)	January 11, 1805	57/58	Unknown	Washington, D.C.	Congressional Cemetery, Washington, D.C.	Thomas Kenan	March 4, 1803 (previously served March 4, 1793 – March 3, 1799)	Sometime in 1747	Kenansville, North Carolina	8th
John A. Hanna	Democratic-Republican	Pennsylvania (4th district)	July 23, 1805	42/43	Unknown	Harrisburg, Pennsylvania	Harrisburg Cemetery, Harrisburg, Pennsylvania	David Bard	March 4, 1797	Sometime in 1762	Flemington, New Jersey	9th
James Jackson	Democratic-Republican	Georgia (Senator)	March 19, 1806	48	Unknown	Washington, D.C.	Congressional Cemetery, Washington, D.C.	John Milledge	March 4, 1801 (U.S. House tenure March 4, 1789 – March 3, 1791/previously served March 4, 1793 – March 3, 1795)	September 21, 1757	Moretonhampstead, Devonshire, England	9th
Christian Lower	Democratic-Republican	Pennsylvania (3rd district)	December 19, 1806	66	Unknown	Tulpehocken Township, Pennsylvania	Tulpehocken Church Burial Ground, Tulpehocken Township, Pennsylvania	Isaac Anderson	March 4, 1805	January 7, 1740	Tulpehocken Township, Pennsylvania	9th
Levi Casey	Democratic-Republican	South Carolina (6th district)	February 3, 1807	53/54	Unknown	Washington, D.C.	Congressional Cemetery, Washington, D.C.	Joseph Calhoun	March 4, 1803	Sometime in 1752	South Carolina	9th
Abraham Baldwin	Democratic-Republican	Georgia (Senator)	March 4, 1807	52	Unknown	Washington, D.C.	Rock Creek Cemetery, Washington, D.C.	George Jones	March 4, 1799 (U.S. House tenure March 4, 1789 – March 3, 1799)	November 22, 1754	Guilford, Connecticut	9th
Uriah Tracy	Federalist	Connecticut (Senator)	July 19, 1807	52	Dropsy	Washington, D.C.	Congressional Cemetery, Washington, D.C.	Chauncey Goodrich	October 13, 1796 (U.S. House tenure April 8, 1793 – October 13, 1796)	February 2, 1755	Franklin, Connecticut	10th
Ezra Darby	Democratic-Republican	New Jersey (at-large)	January 27, 1808	39	"a consumptive complaint"	Washington, D.C.	Congressional Cemetery, Washington, D.C.	Adam Boyd	March 4, 1805	June 7, 1768	Scotch Plains, New Jersey	10th
Jacob Crowninshield	Democratic-Republican	Massachusetts (2nd district)	April 15, 1808	38	Consumption	Washington, D.C.	Harmony Grove Cemetery, Salem, Massachusetts	Joseph Story	March 4, 1803	March 31, 1770	Salem, Massachusetts	10th
Nehemiah Knight	Democratic-Republican	Rhode Island (at-large)	June 13, 1808	62	Unknown	Cranston, Rhode Island	Nehemiah Knight Lot, Knightsville, Cranston, Rhode Island	Richard Jackson Jr.	March 4, 1803	March 23, 1746	Cranston, Rhode Island	10th
John Claiborne	Democratic-Republican	Virginia (17th district)	October 9, 1808	30/31	Unknown	Brunswick County, Virginia	Family burning ground, Dinwiddie, Virginia	Richard Jackson Jr.	March 4, 1805	Sometime in 1777	Brunswick County, Virginia	10th
Francis Malbone	Federalist	Rhode Island (Senator)	June 4, 1809	50	Unknown	Washington, D.C.	Congressional Cemetery, Washington, D.C.	Christopher G. Champlin	March 4, 1809 (U.S. House tenure March 4, 1793 – March 3, 1797)	March 20, 1759	Newport, Rhode Island	11th
Samuel White	Federalist	Delaware (Senator)	November 4, 1809	38	Unknown	Wilmington, Delaware	Old Swedes Episcopal Church Cemetery, Wilmington, Delaware	Outerbridge Horsey	February 28, 1801	December 1770	Kent County, Delaware	11th
James Cox	Democratic-Republican	New Jersey (at-large)	September 12, 1810	56	Stroke	Upper Freehold Township, New Jersey	Yellow Meeting House Cemetery, Upper Freehold Township, New Jersey	John A. Scudder	March 4, 1809	October 16, 1753	Monmouth County, New Jersey	11th
Thomas Blount	Democratic-Republican	North Carolina (3rd district)	February 7, 1812	52	Unknown	Washington, D.C.	Congressional Cemetery, Washington, D.C.	William Kennedy	March 4, 1811 (previously served March 4, 1793 – March 3, 1799 and March 4, 1805 – March 3, 1809)	May 10, 1759	Craven County, North Carolina (now Pitt County, North Carolina)	12th
John Smilie	Democratic-Republican	Pennsylvania (9th district)	December 30, 1812	70/71	Unknown	Washington, D.C.	Congressional Cemetery, Washington, D.C.	Isaac Griffin	March 4, 1799 (previously served March 4, 1793 – March 3, 1795)	Sometime in 1741	Newtownards, County Down, Ireland	12th
Robert Whitehill	Democratic-Republican	Pennsylvania (5th district)	April 8, 1813	74	Unknown	Cumberland County, Pennsylvania	Silver Spring Presbyterian Church Cemetery, Hampden Township, Cumberland County, Pennsylvania	William Crawford	March 4, 1805	July 21, 1738	Pequea, Pennsylvania	13th
John Dawson	Democratic-Republican	Virginia (11th district)	March 31, 1814	51/52	Unknown	Washington, D.C.	Congressional Cemetery, Washington, D.C.	Philip P. Barbour	March 4, 1797	Sometime in 1762	Virginia	13th
Nicholas Gilman	Democratic-Republican	New Hampshire (Senator)	May 2, 1814	58	Unknown	Philadelphia, Pennsylvania	Exeter Cemetery, Exeter, New Hampshire	Thomas W. Thompson	March 4, 1805 (previously served March 4, 1797 – March 3, 1803)	August 3, 1755	Exeter, New Hampshire	13th
Jacob Hufty	Federalist	New Jersey (at-large)	May 20, 1814	63/64	Unknown	Salem, New Jersey	St. John's Episcopal Cemetery, Salem, New Jersey	Thomas Ward	March 4, 1809	1750	New Jersey	13th
Richard Brent	Democratic-Republican	Virginia (Senator)	December 30, 1814	57	Unknown	Washington, D.C.	Stafford County, Virginia	James Barbour	March 4, 1809 (U.S. House tenure March 4, 1795 – March 3, 1799 and March 4, 1801 – March 3, 1803)	Sometime in 1757	Stafford County, Virginia	13th
David Bard	Democratic-Republican	Pennsylvania (9th district)	March 12, 1815	70/71	Unknown	Alexandria, Pennsylvania	Sinking Valley Cemetery, Arch Spring, Pennsylvania	Thomas Burnside	March 4, 1803 (previously served March 4, 1795 – March 3, 1799)	Sometime in 1744	Adams County, Pennsylvania	14th
Jonathan Williams	Democratic-Republican	Pennsylvania (1st district)	May 16, 1815	63	Gout	Philadelphia, Pennsylvania	Laurel Hill Cemetery, Fairmount Park, Pennsylvania	John Sergeant	March 4, 1815	May 20, 1751	Boston, Massachusetts	14th
Matthew Clay	Democratic-Republican	Virginia (15th district)	May 27, 1815	61	Unknown	Halifax Court House, Virginia	Old family burying ground, Pittsylvania County, Virginia	John Kerr	March 4, 1815 (previously served March 4, 1797 – March 3, 1813)	March 25, 1754	Halifax County, Virginia	14th
John Sevier	Democratic-Republican	Tennessee (2nd district)	September 24, 1815	70	Unknown	Alabama Territory	Old Knox County Courthouse Grounds, Knoxville, Tennessee	William Grainger Blount	March 4, 1811 (previously served June 16, 1790 – March 3, 1791)	September 23, 1745	Augusta County, Virginia (now Rockingham County, Virginia)	14th
Elijah Brigham	Federalist	Massachusetts (11th district)	February 22, 1816	64	Unknown	Washington, D.C.	Congressional Cemetery, Washington, D.C.	Benjamin Adams	March 4, 1811	July 7, 1751	Northborough, Massachusetts	14th
Richard Stanford	Democratic-Republican	North Carolina (8th district)	April 9, 1816	49	Erysipelas	Georgetown (Washington, D.C.)	Congressional Cemetery, Washington, D.C.	Samuel Dickens	March 4, 1797	March 2, 1767	Vienna, Maryland	14th
Thomas Gholson Jr.	Democratic-Republican	Virginia (18th district)	July 4, 1816	35/36	Unknown	Gholsonville, Virginia	Congressional Cemetery, Washington, D.C.	Thomas M. Nelson	November 7, 1808	Sometime in 1780	Gholsonville, Virginia	14th
John Clopton	Democratic-Republican	Virginia (23rd district)	September 11, 1816	60	Unknown	Tunstall, New Kent County, Virginia	Family burying ground	John Tyler	March 4, 1801 (previously served March 4, 1795 – March 3, 1799)	February 7, 1756	New Kent County, Virginia	14th
John Woods	Federalist	Pennsylvania (14th district)	December 16, 1816	54/55	Unknown	Brunswick County, Virginia	Family burying ground	Henry Baldwin	March 4, 1815	Sometime in 1761	Bedford, Pennsylvania	14th
William C. C. Claiborne	Democratic-Republican	Louisiana (Senator)	November 23, 1817	42/45	Unknown	New Orleans, Louisiana	Metairie Cemetery, New Orleans, Louisiana	Henry Johnson	March 4, 1817 (U.S. House tenure November 23, 1797 – March 3, 1801)	Sometime between 1772 and 1775	Sussex County, Virginia	15th
Peterson Goodwyn	Democratic-Republican	Virginia (18th district)	February 21, 1818	72/73	Unknown	Washington County, Virginia	Family cemetery in Dinwiddie County, Virginia	John Pegram	March 4, 1803	Sometime in 1745	Dinwiddie County, Virginia	15th
George Mumford	Democratic-Republican	North Carolina (10th district)	December 31, 1818	Unknown	Unknown	Washington, D.C.	Congressional Cemetery, Washington, D.C.	Charles Fisher	March 4, 1817	Unknown	Rowan County, North Carolina	15th
Alexander C. Hanson	Federalist	Maryland (Senator)	April 23, 1819	33	Unknown	Elkridge, Maryland	Family burial ground, Elkridge, Maryland	William Pinkney	December 20, 1816 (U.S. House tenure March 4, 1813 – 1816)	February 27, 1786	Annapolis, Maryland	15th
David Walker	Democratic-Republican	Kentucky (6th district)	March 1, 1820	56	Unknown	Washington, D.C.	Congressional Cemetery, Washington, D.C.	Francis Johnson	March 4, 1817	Unknown	Brunswick County, Virginia	16th
Nathaniel Hazard	Democratic-Republican	Rhode Island (at-large)	December 17, 1820	44	Unknown	Washington, D.C.	Congressional Cemetery, Washington, D.C.	Job Durfee	March 4, 1819	Sometime in 1776	Newport, Rhode Island	16th
Jesse Slocumb	Federalist	North Carolina (4th district)	December 20, 1820	40	Unknown	Washington, D.C.	Congressional Cemetery, Washington, D.C.	William S. Blackledge	March 4, 1817	Sometime in 1780	Dudley, North Carolina	16th
James Burrill Jr.	Federalist	Rhode Island (Senator)	December 25, 1820	48	Consumption	Washington, D.C.	Congressional Cemetery, Washington, D.C.	Nehemiah R. Knight	March 4, 1817	April 25, 1772	Providence, Rhode Island	16th
John Linn	Democratic-Republican	New Jersey (at-large)	January 5, 1821	57	Unknown	Washington, D.C.	North Hardyston Cemetery, Hardyston Township, New Jersey	Samuel Swan	March 4, 1817	December 3, 1763	Hardwick Township, New Jersey	16th
William A. Burwell	Democratic-Republican	Virginia (14th district)	February 16, 1821	40	Unknown	Washington, D.C.	Congressional Cemetery, Washington, D.C.	Jabez Leftwich	December 1, 1806	March 15, 1780	Boydton, Virginia	16th
Wingfield Bullock	Democratic-Republican	Kentucky (8th district)	October 13, 1821	54/55	Unknown	Shelbyville, Kentucky	Old family burying ground, Shelbyville, Kentucky	James D. Breckinridge	March 4, 1821	Sometime in 1766	Spotsylvania, Virginia	17th
William A. Trimble	Democratic-Republican	Ohio (Senator)	December 13, 1821	35	Attributed to previous battle wound	Washington, D.C.	Congressional Cemetery, Washington, D.C.	Ethan A. Brown	March 4, 1819	April 4, 1786	Woodford County, Kentucky	17th
William Pinkney	Democratic-Republican	Maryland (Senator)	February 25, 1822	57	Unknown	Washington, D.C.	Congressional Cemetery, Washington, D.C.	Samuel Smith	December 21, 1819 (U.S. House tenure March 4, 1791 – November 1791 and March 4, 1815 – April 18, 1816)	March 17, 1764	Annapolis, Maryland	17th
James Overstreet	Democratic-Republican	South Carolina (4th district)	May 24, 1822	49	Unknown	China Grove, North Carolina	Savitz Cemetery, China Grove, North Carolina	Andrew R. Govan	March 4, 1819	February 11, 1773	Barnwell District, Province of South Carolina	17th
Thomas Van Swearingen	Federalist	Virginia (2nd district)	August 19, 1822	38	Unknown	Shepherdstown, Virginia	Elmwood Cemetery, Shepherdstown, West Virginia	James Stephenson	March 4, 1819	May 5, 1784	Shepherdstown, Virginia	17th
Ludwig Worman	Federalist	Pennsylvania (7th district)	October 17, 1822	60/61	Unknown	Earl Township, Pennsylvania	Earl Township Cemetery, Earl Township, Pennsylvania	Daniel Udree	March 4, 1821	Sometime in 1761	Tinicum Township, Pennsylvania	17th
Elijah Boardman	Democratic-Republican	Connecticut (Senator)	August 18, 1823	63	Attributed to cholera and fever	Boardman, Ohio	Center Cemetery, New Milford, Connecticut	Henry W. Edwards	March 4, 1821	March 7, 1760	New Milford, Connecticut	18th
William Lee Ball	Democratic-Republican	Virginia (13th district)	February 29, 1824	43	Unknown	Washington, D.C.	Congressional Cemetery, Washington, D.C.	John Taliaferro	March 4, 1817	January 2, 1781	Lancaster County, Virginia	18th
John Taylor of Caroline	Democratic-Republican	Virginia (Senator)	August 21, 1824	70	Unknown	Caroline County, Virginia	Hazelwood Farm Cemetery, Caroline County, Virginia	Littleton W. Tazewell	December 18, 1822 (previously served October 18, 1792 – May 11, 1794 and June 4, 1803 – December 7, 1803)	December 19, 1753	Caroline County, Virginia	18th
Nicholas Ware	Democratic-Republican	Georgia (Senator)	September 7, 1824	48	Unknown	New York City, New York	Under the annex of Grace Church, New York City, New York	Thomas W. Cobb	November 10, 1821	February 16, 1776	Caroline County, Virginia	18th
William Prince	Democratic-Republican	Indiana (1st district)	September 8, 1824	41/42	Unknown	Princeton, Indiana	Old Cemetery, Princeton, Indiana	Jacob Call	March 4, 1823	1772	Ireland	18th
Charles Rich	Democratic-Republican	Vermont (3rd district)	October 15, 1824	53	Unknown	Shoreham, Vermont	Family vault, Shoreham, Vermont	Henry Olin	March 4, 1817 (previously served March 4, 1813 – March 3, 1815)	September 13, 1771	Warwick, Massachusetts	18th
Patrick Farrelly	Republican	Pennsylvania (18th district)	January 12, 1826	55/56	Unknown	Meadville, Pennsylvania	Greendale Cemetery, Meadville, Pennsylvania	Thomas Hale Sill	March 4, 1821	Sometime in 1770	Ireland	19th
Henry H. Chambers	Democratic-Republican	Alabama (Senator)	January 24, 1826	35	Unknown	Kenbridge, Virginia	Family burial ground, Kenbridge, Virginia	Israel Pickens	March 4, 1825	October 1, 1790	Kenbridge, Virginia	19th
John Gaillard	Democratic-Republican	South Carolina (Senator)	February 26, 1826	60	Unknown	Washington, D.C.	Congressional Cemetery, Washington, D.C.	William Harper	December 6, 1804	September 5, 1765	Province of South Carolina	19th
Christopher Rankin	Republican	Mississippi (at-large)	March 14, 1826	37/38	Unknown	Washington, D.C.	Congressional Cemetery, Washington, D.C.	William Haile	March 4, 1819	Sometime in 1788	Washington County, Pennsylvania	19th
Nicholas Van Dyke	Federalist	Delaware (Senator)	May 21, 1826	55	Unknown	New Castle, Delaware	Immanuel Episcopal Church Cemetery, New Castle, Delaware	Daniel Rodney	March 4, 1817 (U.S. House tenure October 6, 1807 – March 3, 1811)	December 20, 1769	New Castle, Delaware	19th
James Johnson	Democratic	Kentucky (5th district)	August 13, 1826	52	Unknown	Washington, D.C.	Family cemetery, Great Crossing, Kentucky	Robert L. McHatton	March 4, 1825	January 1, 1774	Orange County, Virginia	19th
Henry Wilson	Democratic	Pennsylvania (7th district)	August 14, 1826	47/48	Unknown	Allentown, Pennsylvania	Union Cemetery, Allentown, Pennsylvania	William Addams	March 4, 1823	Sometime in 1778	Dauphin, Pennsylvania	19th
Joseph McIlvaine	Republican	New Jersey (Senator)	August 19, 1826	56	Unknown	Burlington, New Jersey	Saint Mary's Episcopal Churchyard, Burlington, New Jersey	Ephraim Bateman	November 12, 1823	October 2, 1769	Bristol, Pennsylvania	19th
Robert P. Henry	Democratic	Kentucky (12th district)	August 25, 1826	37	Unknown	Hopkinsville, Kentucky	Pioneer Cemetery, Hopkinsville, Kentucky	John F. Henry	March 4, 1823	November 24, 1788	Henrys Mills, Kentucky	19th
William Wilson	Democratic-Republican	Ohio (8th district)	June 6, 1827	54	"a bilious complaint"	Newark, Ohio	Cedar Hill Cemetery, Newark, Ohio	William Stanbery	March 4, 1823	March 19, 1773	New Boston, New Hampshire	20th
William Burleigh	Republican	Maine (1st district)	July 2, 1827	41	Unknown	South Berwick, Maine	Portland Street Cemetery, South Berwick, Maine	Rufus McIntire	March 4, 1823	October 24, 1785	South Berwick, Maine	20th
William Singleton Young	Republican	Kentucky (11th district)	September 20, 1827	37	Unknown	Elizabethtown, Kentucky	Elizabethtown Cemetery, Elizabethtown, Kentucky	John Calhoon	March 4, 1825	April 10, 1790	Bardstown, Kentucky	20th
Henry Wharton Conway	Democratic-Republican	Arkansas (Delegate)	November 9, 1827	34	Killed in a duel	Napoleon, Arkansas	Scull Cemetery, Arkansas Post, Arkansas	Ambrose H. Sevier	March 4, 1823	March 18, 1793	Greeneville, Tennessee	20th
George Holcombe	Democratic-Republican	New Jersey (at-large)	January 4, 1828	41	Consumption	Allentown, New Jersey	Congressional Cemetery, Washington, D.C.	James F. Randolph	March 4, 1821	March 1786	Hunterdon County, New Jersey	20th
Hedge Thompson	Republican	New Jersey (at-large)	July 23, 1828	48	Pulmonary disease	Salem, New Jersey	St. John's Protestant Episcopal Churchyard, Salem, New Jersey	Thomas Sinnickson	March 4, 1827	January 28, 1780	Salem, New Jersey	20th
Gabriel Holmes	Republican	North Carolina (5th district)	September 26, 1829	59/60	Unknown	Clinton, North Carolina	John Sampson Cemetery, Clinton, North Carolina	Edward B. Dudley	March 4, 1825	Sometime in 1769	Clinton, North Carolina	21st
Thomas Buck Reed	Democratic	Mississippi (Senator)	November 26, 1829	42	Unknown	Lexington, Kentucky	Old Baptist Cemetery, Lexington, Kentucky	Robert H. Adams	March 4, 1829 (previously served January 28, 1826 – March 4, 1827)	May 7, 1787	Lexington, Kentucky	21st
Alexander Smyth	Democratic	Virginia (22nd district)	April 17, 1830	64/65	Unknown	Washington, D.C.	Congressional Cemetery, Washington, D.C.	Joseph Draper	March 4, 1827 (previously served March 4, 1817 – March 3, 1825)	Sometime in 1765	Rathlin Island, Ireland	21st
Robert H. Adams	Democratic	Mississippi (Senator)	July 2, 1830	37/38	Unknown	Natchez, Mississippi	Natchez City Cemetery, Natchez, Mississippi	George Poindexter	February 8, 1830	Sometime in 1792	Rockbridge County, Virginia	21st
John McLean	Democratic	Illinois (Senator)	October 14, 1830	37/38	Paralysis	Shawneetown, Illinois	Westwood Cemetery, Shawneetown, Illinois	David J. Baker	March 4, 1829 (U.S. House tenure December 3, 1818 – March 3, 1819/previously served November 24, 1824 – March 3, 1825)	February 4, 1791	Greensboro, North Carolina	21st
James Noble	Democratic-Republican	Indiana (Senator)	February 26, 1831	45	Unknown	Washington, D.C.	Congressional Cemetery, Washington, D.C.	Robert Hanna	December 11, 1816	December 16, 1785	Berryville, Virginia	21st
Rollin Carolas Mallary	Democratic-Republican	Vermont (2nd district)	April 15, 1831	46	Unknown	Baltimore, Maryland	East Poultney Cemetery, East Poultney, Vermont	William Slade	January 13, 1820	May 27, 1784	Cheshire, Connecticut	22nd
Spencer D. Pettis	Democratic	Missouri (at-large)	August 28, 1831	29	Killed in a duel	St. Louis, Missouri	Saint Louis City Cemetery-Rutger	William H. Ashley	March 4, 1829	Sometime in 1802	Culpeper County, Virginia	22nd
William Ramsey	Democratic	Pennsylvania (11th district)	September 29, 1831	52	Unknown	Carlisle, Pennsylvania	Ashland Cemetery, Carlisle, Pennsylvania	Robert McCoy	March 4, 1827	September 7, 1779	Sterretts Gap, Pennsylvania	22nd
Jonathan Hunt	Republican	Vermont (1st district)	May 15, 1832	44	Unknown	Washington, D.C.	Old Cemetery, Brattleboro, Vermont	Hiland Hall	March 4, 1827	August 12, 1787	Vernon, Vermont	22nd
Charles Clement Johnston	Republican	Virginia (22nd district)	June 17, 1832	37	Accidental drowning	Alexandria, Virginia	Congressional Cemetery, Washington, D.C.	Joseph Draper	March 4, 1831	April 30, 1795	Prince Edward County, Virginia	22nd
George E. Mitchell	Republican	Maryland (6th district)	June 28, 1832	51	Unknown	Washington, D.C.	Congressional Cemetery, Washington, D.C.	Charles S. Sewall	December 7, 1829 (previously served March 4, 1823 – March 3, 1827)	March 3, 1781	Elkton, Maryland	22nd
Philip Doddridge	Republican	Virginia (18th district)	November 19, 1832	59	Unknown	Washington, D.C.	Congressional Cemetery, Washington, D.C.	Joseph Johnson	March 4, 1829	May 17, 1773	Bedford County, Virginia	22nd
James Lent	Democratic	New York (1st district)	February 22, 1833	51	Unknown	Washington, D.C.	Presbyterian Cemetery, Long Island, New York	Abel Huntington	March 4, 1829	Sometime in 1782	Long Island, New York	22nd
Josiah S. Johnston	Democratic-Republican	Louisiana (Senator)	May 19, 1833	48	Resulting from an explosion aboard the steamship Lioness	Red River, Louisiana	Rapides Cemetery, Pineville, Louisiana	Alexander Porter	January 15, 1824 (U.S. House tenure March 4, 1821 – March 3, 1823)	November 24, 1784	Salisbury, Connecticut	23rd
John Randolph of Roanoke	Democratic-Republican	Virginia (5th district)	May 24, 1833	59	Consumption	Philadelphia, Pennsylvania	Hollywood Cemetery, Richmond, Virginia	Thomas T. Bouldin	March 4, 1833 (previously served March 4, 1799 – March 3, 1813, March 4, 1815 – March 3, 1817, March 4, 1819 – December 26, 1825 and March 4, 1827 – March 3, 1829/U.S. Senate tenure December 26, 1825 – March 3, 1827)	June 2, 1773	Cawsons, Virginia	23rd
Alexander Buckner	Democratic	Missouri (Senator)	June 6, 1833	47/48	Cholera	Cape Girardeau County, Missouri	City Cemetery, Cape Girardeau, Missouri	Lewis F. Linn	March 4, 1831	March 8, 1785	Jefferson County, Kentucky	23rd
Thomas D. Singleton	Nullifier	South Carolina (3rd district)	November 25, 1833	Unknown	Unknown	Raleigh, North Carolina	Congressional Cemetery, Washington, D.C.	Robert B. Campbell	March 4, 1833	Unknown	Kingstree, South Carolina	23rd
Thomas Bouldin	Nullifier	Virginia (5th district)	February 11, 1834	52/53	Unknown	Washington, D.C.	Private cemetery, Drakes Branch, Virginia	James Bouldin	August 26, 1833 (previously served March 4, 1829 – March 3, 1833)	Sometime in 1781	Charlotte Court House, Virginia	23rd
James Blair	Democratic	South Carolina (8th district)	April 1, 1834	47	Suicide	Washington, D.C.	Congressional Cemetery, Washington, D.C.	Richard Irvine Manning I	March 4, 1829 (previously served March 4, 1821 – May 8, 1822)	September 26, 1786	Waxhaws, Lancaster County, South Carolina	23rd
Littleton Purnell Dennis	Republican	Maryland (1st district)	April 14, 1834	47	Unknown	Washington, D.C.	Congressional Cemetery, Washington, D.C.	John Nevett Steele	March 4, 1833	July 21, 1786	Pocomoke City, Maryland	23rd
Benjamin F. Deming	Anti-Masonic	Vermont (5th district)	July 11, 1834	44	Unknown	Saratoga Springs, New York	Danville Green Cemetery, Danville, Vermont	Henry Fisk Janes	March 4, 1833	January 1, 1790	Danville, Vermont	23rd
Charles Slade	Democratic	Illinois (1st district)	July 26, 1834	36/37	Unknown	Vincennes, Indiana	Unknown	John Reynolds	March 4, 1833	Sometime in 1797	England	23rd
Warren R. Davis	Nullifier	South Carolina (6th district)	January 29, 1835	41	Unknown	Washington, D.C.	Congressional Cemetery, Washington, D.C.	Waddy Thompson Jr.	March 4, 1827	May 8, 1793	Columbia, South Carolina	23rd
Nathan Smith	Whig	Connecticut (Senator)	December 6, 1835	65	Unknown	Washington, D.C.	Grove Street Cemetery, New Haven, Connecticut	John M. Niles	March 4, 1833	January 8, 1770	Woodbury, Connecticut	24th
Zalmon Wildman	Democratic	Connecticut (at-large)	December 10, 1835	60	Unknown	Washington, D.C.	Wooster Cemetery, Danbury, Connecticut	Thomas T. Whittlesey	March 4, 1835	February 16, 1775	Danbury, Connecticut	24th
Elias Kane	Democratic	Illinois (Senator)	December 12, 1835	41	"autumnal fever"	Washington, D.C.	Evergreen Cemetery, Chester, Illinois	William L.D. Ewing	March 4, 1825	June 7, 1794	New York City, New York	24th
Richard Irvine Manning I	Democratic-Republican	South Carolina (8th district)	May 1, 1836	47	Pulmonary hemorrhage	Philadelphia, Pennsylvania	Trinity Episcopal churchyard, Columbia, South Carolina	John Peter Richardson II	December 8, 1834	May 1, 1789	Sumter County, South Carolina	24th
David Dickson	Republican	Mississippi (at-large)	July 31, 1836	42	Unknown	Hot Springs, Arkansas	Unknown	Samuel J. Gholson	March 4, 1835	March 22, 1794	Georgia	24th
John E. Coffee	Democratic	Georgia (at-large)	September 25, 1836	32/33	Unknown	Jacksonville, Georgia	McRae Cemetery, McRae, Georgia	William Crosby Dawson	March 4, 1833	December 3, 1782	Prince Edward County, Virginia	24th
Robert Henry Goldsborough	Whig	Maryland (Senator)	October 5, 1836	57	Unknown	Easton, Maryland	Ashby, Talbot County, Maryland	John S. Spence	January 13, 1835 (previously served May 21, 1813 – March 3, 1819)	January 4, 1779	Easton, Maryland	24th
George L. Kinnard	Republican	Indiana (6th district)	November 26, 1836	33	From injuries received in an explosion on the steamer Flora on the Ohio River	Ohio River	Presbyterian Burying Ground, Cincinnati, Ohio	William Herod	March 4, 1833	Sometime in 1803	Pennsylvania	24th
Francis J. Harper	Democratic	Pennsylvania (3rd district)	March 18, 1837	37	Unknown	Frankford, Philadelphia, Pennsylvania	Congressional Cemetery, Washington, D.C.	Charles Naylor	March 4, 1837	March 5, 1800	Frankford, Philadelphia, Pennsylvania	25th
James I. Standifer	Democratic	Tennessee (4th district)	August 20, 1837	58	Unknown	Kingston, Tennessee	Baptist Cemetery, Kingston, Tennessee	William Stone	March 4, 1829 (previously served March 4, 1823 – March 3, 1825)	April 19, 1779	Henry County, Virginia	25th
Joseph Kent	Whig	Maryland (Senator)	November 24, 1837	58	Following fall from horse	Bladensburg, Maryland	Unmarked grave	William D. Merrick	March 4, 1833 (previously served March 4, 1811 – March 3, 1815 and March 4, 1819 – January 6, 1826)	January 14, 1779	Calvert County, Maryland	25th
Jonathan Cilley	Democratic	Maine (3rd district)	February 24, 1838	36	Killed in a duel	Bladensburg, Maryland	Elm Grove Cemetery, Thomaston, Maine	Edward Robinson	March 4, 1837	July 2, 1802	Nottingham, New Hampshire	25th
Timothy J. Carter	Democratic	Maine (5th district)	March 14, 1838	37	Unknown	Washington, D.C.		Virgil D. Parris	March 4, 1837	August 18, 1800	Bethel, Massachusetts	25th
Isaac McKim	Democratic	Maryland (4th district)	April 1, 1838	62	Pleurisy	Baltimore, Maryland	Burying ground of St. Paul's Church, Baltimore, Maryland	John P. Kennedy	March 4, 1833 (previously served January 4, 1823 – March 3, 1825)	July 21, 1775	Baltimore, Maryland	25th
Joab Lawler	Whig	Alabama (3rd district)	May 8, 1838	41	"bilious pleurisy"	Washington, D.C.	Congressional Cemetery, Washington, D.C.	George W. Crabb	March 4, 1835	June 21, 1796	Union County, North Carolina	25th
Andrew DeWitt Bruyn	Democratic	New York (22nd district)	July 27, 1838	47	Unknown	Ithaca, New York	Ithaca City Cemetery, Ithaca, New York	Cyrus Beers	March 4, 1837	November 18, 1790	Wawarsing, New York	25th
William Patterson	Whig	New York (29th district)	August 14, 1838	49	"fever"	Warsaw, New York	Warsaw Town Cemetery, Warsaw, New York	Vacant	March 4, 1837	June 4, 1789	Londonderry, New Hampshire	25th
Eleazer Wheelock Ripley	Democratic	Louisiana (2nd district)	March 2, 1839	56	Unknown	West Feliciana Parish, Louisiana	Locust Grove Cemetery, St. Francisville, Louisiana	Thomas Withers Chinn	March 4, 1835	April 15, 1782	Hanover, New Hampshire	25th
Albert Galliton Harrison	Republican	Missouri (at-large)	September 7, 1839	39	Unknown	Fulton, Missouri	Congressional Cemetery, Washington, D.C.	John Jameson	March 4, 1835	June 26, 1800	Mt. Sterling, Kentucky	26th
James C. Alvord	Whig	Massachusetts (6th district)	September 27, 1839	31	Unknown	Greenfield, Massachusetts	Federal Street Cemetery, Greenfield, Massachusetts	Osmyn Baker	March 4, 1839	April 15, 1808	Greenwich, Massachusetts	26th
William W. Potter	Democratic	Pennsylvania (14th district)	October 28, 1839	46	Unknown	Bellefonte, Pennsylvania	Union Cemetery, Bellefonte, Pennsylvania	George McCulloch	March 4, 1837	December 18, 1792	Potters Mills, Pennsylvania	26th
Thaddeus Betts	Whig	Connecticut (Senator)	April 7, 1840	51	"nervous fever"	Washington, D.C.	Union Cemetery, Norwalk, Connecticut	Jabez W. Huntington	March 4, 1839	February 4, 1789	Norwalk, Connecticut	26th
Anson Brown	Whig	New York (11th district)	June 14, 1840	39/40	Unknown	Ballston Spa, New York	Ballston Spa Cemetery, Ballston Spa, New York	Nicholas B. Doe	March 4, 1839	Sometime in 1800	Charlton, New York	26th
Simeon H. Anderson	Whig	Kentucky (5th district)	August 11, 1840	38	Unknown	Lancaster, Kentucky	Anderson family cemetery, Lancaster, Kentucky	John B. Thompson	March 4, 1839	March 2, 1802	Lancaster, Kentucky	26th
William Sterrett Ramsey	Democratic	Pennsylvania (13th district)	October 17, 1840	30	Suicide	Baltimore, Maryland	Ashland Cemetery, Carlisle, Pennsylvania	Amos Gustine	March 4, 1839	June 12, 1810	Carlisle, Pennsylvania	26th
John S. Spence	Whig	Maryland (Senator)	October 24, 1840	52	Unknown	Berlin, Maryland	Episcopal Churchyard, Berlin, Maryland	John L. Kerr	December 31, 1836 (U.S. House tenure March 4, 1823 – March 3, 1825 and March 4, 1831 – March 3, 1833)	February 29, 1788	Snow Hill, Maryland	26th
Felix Grundy	Democratic	Tennessee (Senator)	December 19, 1840	63	Unknown	Nashville, Tennessee	Nashville City Cemetery, Nashville, Tennessee	Alfred O. P. Nicholson	December 14, 1839 (U.S. House tenure March 4, 1811 – 1814/previously served October 19, 1829 – July 4, 1838)	September 11, 1777	Berkeley County, Virginia	26th
Charles Ogle	Whig	Pennsylvania (18th district)	May 10, 1841	42/43	Tuberculosis	Somerset, Pennsylvania	Union Cemetery, Somerset, Pennsylvania	Henry Black	March 4, 1837	Sometime in 1798	Somerset, Pennsylvania	27th
Henry Black	Whig	Pennsylvania (18th district)	November 28, 1841	58	Apoplexy	Somerset, Pennsylvania	Family cemetery, Stonycreek Township, Somerset County, Pennsylvania	James M. Russell	June 28, 1841	February 25, 1783	Somerset, Pennsylvania	27th
Davis Dimock Jr.	Democratic	Pennsylvania (17th district)	January 13, 1842	40	Unknown	Montrose, Pennsylvania	Congressional Cemetery, Washington, D.C.	Almon Heath Read	March 4, 1841	September 17, 1801	Exeter, Pennsylvania	27th
Nathan F. Dixon I	Whig	Rhode Island (Senator)	January 29, 1842	67	"inflammation of the lungs"	Washington, D.C.	River Bend Cemetery, Westerly, Rhode Island	William Sprague	March 4, 1839	December 13, 1774	Plainfield, Connecticut	27th
Lewis Williams	Republican	North Carolina (13th district)	February 23, 1842	60	"bilious pleurisy"	Washington, D.C.	Panther Creek Cemetery, Lewisville, North Carolina	Anderson Mitchell	March 4, 1815	February 1, 1782	Surry County, North Carolina (present Forsyth County)	27th
Joseph Lawrence	Republican	Pennsylvania (21st district)	April 17, 1842	60	Attributed to fatigue and anxiety	Washington, D.C.	Congressional Cemetery, Washington, D.C.	Thomas McKean Thompson McKennan	March 4, 1841 (previously served March 4, 1825 – March 3, 1829)	Sometime in 1786	Hunterstown, Pennsylvania	27th
William Soden Hastings	Whig	Massachusetts (9th district)	June 17, 1842	44	Unknown	Red Sulphur Springs, Virginia	Old Cemetery, Mendon, Massachusetts	Henry Williams	March 4, 1837	June 3, 1798	Mendon, Massachusetts	27th
Samuel L. Southard	Whig	New Jersey (Senator)	June 26, 1842	55	Unknown	Fredericksburg, Virginia	Congressional Cemetery, Washington, D.C.	William L. Dayton	March 4, 1833 (previously served January 26, 1821 – March 3, 1823)	June 9, 1787	Basking Ridge, New Jersey	27th
Richard W. Habersham	Whig	Georgia (at-large)	December 2, 1842	55/56	"abscess of the liver"	U.S.	Old Cemetery, Clarkesville, Georgia	George W. Crawford	March 4, 1839	December 1786	U.S.	27th
James Wray Williams	Democratic	Maryland (3rd district)	December 2, 1842	50	Apoplexy	Prieshford Farm, Maryland	Family cemetery, Prieshford Farm, Maryland	Charles S. Sewall	March 4, 1841	October 8, 1792	U.S.	27th
Samuel McRoberts	Democratic	Illinois (Senator)	March 27, 1843	43	Consumption	Cincinnati, Ohio	Moore Cemetery, Waterloo, Illinois	James Semple	March 4, 1841	April 12, 1799	Maeystown, Illinois	28th
Barker Burnell	Whig	Massachusetts (10th district)	June 15, 1843	45	Consumption	Washington, D.C.	Prospect Hill Cemetery, Nantucket, Massachusetts	Joseph Grinnell	March 4, 1841	January 30, 1798	Nantucket, Massachusetts	28th
Lewis F. Linn	Democratic	Missouri (Senator)	October 3, 1843	46	"affection of the heart"	Ste. Genevieve, Missouri	Ste. Genevieve Memorial Cemetery, Ste. Genevieve, Missouri	David R. Atchison	October 25, 1833	November 5, 1796	Louisville, Kentucky	28th
John Millen	Democratic	Georgia (at-large)	October 15, 1843	38/39	Unknown	Savannah, Georgia	Laurel Grove Cemetery, Savannah, Georgia	Duncan Lamont Clinch	March 4, 1843	Sometime in 1804	Savannah, Georgia	28th
Henry Frick	Whig	Pennsylvania (13th district)	March 1, 1844	48	Consumption	Washington, D.C.	Congressional Cemetery, Washington, D.C.	James Pollock	March 4, 1843	March 17, 1795	Northumberland, Pennsylvania	28th
Heman A. Moore	Democratic	Ohio (10th district)	April 3, 1844	34	Consumption	Columbus, Ohio	Green Lawn Cemetery, Columbus, Ohio	Alfred P. Stone	March 4, 1843	August 27, 1809	Plainfield, Vermont	28th
Pierre Bossier	Democratic	Louisiana (4th district)	April 24, 1844	47	Unknown	Washington, D.C.	Catholic Cemetery, Natchitoches, Louisiana	Isaac Edward Morse	March 4, 1843	March 22, 1797	Natchitoches, Louisiana	28th
Henry R. Brinkerhoff	Democratic	Ohio (21st district)	April 30, 1844	56	Unknown	Huron County, Ohio	Pioneer Cemetery, Plymouth, Ohio	Edward S. Hamlin	March 4, 1843	September 23, 1787	Adams County, Pennsylvania	28th
Almon Heath Read	Democratic	Pennsylvania (12th district)	June 3, 1844	53	Unknown	Montrose, Pennsylvania	Montrose Cemetery, Montrose, Pennsylvania	George Fuller	March 18, 1842	June 12, 1790	Shelburne, Vermont	28th
William S. Fulton	Democratic	Arkansas (Senator)	August 15, 1844	49	Unknown	Little Rock, Arkansas	Mount Holly Cemetery, Little Rock, Arkansas	Chester Ashley	September 18, 1836	June 2, 1795	Cecil County, Maryland	28th
Isaac C. Bates	Whig	Massachusetts (Senator)	March 16, 1845	66	Unknown	Washington, D.C.	Bridge Street Cemetery, Northampton, Massachusetts	John Davis	January 13, 1841 (U.S. House tenure March 4, 1827 – March 3, 1835)	January 23, 1779	Granville, Massachusetts	29th
John Bennett Dawson	Democratic	Louisiana (3rd district)	June 26, 1845	47	Unknown	St. Francisville, Louisiana	Grace Episcopal churchyard, St. Francisville, Louisiana	John Henry Harmanson	March 4, 1841	March 17, 1798	Nashville, Tennessee	29th
Samuel G. Wright	Whig	New Jersey (2nd district)	July 30, 1845	63	"Abdominal dropsy"	Imlaystown, New Jersey	East Branch Cemetery, Imlaystown, New Jersey	George Sykes	March 4, 1845	November 18, 1781	Wrightstown, New Jersey	29th
Joseph H. Peyton	Whig	Tennessee (8th district)	November 11, 1845	37	Unknown	Gallatin, Tennessee	Family burying ground, Gallatin, Tennessee	Edwin H. Ewing	March 4, 1843	May 20, 1808	Gallatin, Tennessee	29th
William Taylor	Democratic	Virginia (11th district)	January 17, 1846	57	"seized with a convulsion"	Washington, D.C.	Congressional Cemetery, Washington, D.C.	James McDowell	March 4, 1843	April 5, 1788	Alexandria, Virginia	29th
Richard P. Herrick	Whig	New York (12th district)	June 20, 1846	55	"inflammation of the bowels"	Washington, D.C.	Greenbush Cemetery, Rensselaer County, New York	Thomas C. Ripley	March 4, 1845	March 23, 1791	Greenbush, New York	29th
Felix Grundy McConnell	Democratic	Alabama (7th district)	September 10, 1846	37	Stabbed himself to death	Washington, D.C.	Congressional Cemetery, Washington, D.C.	Franklin W. Bowdon	March 4, 1843	April 1, 1809	Nashville, Tennessee	29th
Alexander Barrow	Whig	Louisiana (Senator)	December 29, 1846	45	Intestinal complication	Baltimore, Maryland	Family cemetery, Afton Villa plantation, Bayou Sara, Louisiana	Pierre Soulé	March 4, 1841	March 27, 1801	Nashville, Tennessee	29th
Isaac S. Pennybacker	Democratic	Virginia (Senator)	January 12, 1847	41	"organic disease of the liver"	Washington, D.C.	Woodbine Cemetery, Harrisonburg, Virginia	James M. Mason	December 3, 1845 (U.S. House tenure March 4, 1837 – March 3, 1839)	September 3, 1805	New Market, Virginia	29th
George Dromgoole	Democratic	Virginia (2nd district)	April 27, 1847	49	Pleurisy and bilious pneumonia	Brunswick County, Virginia	Congressional Cemetery, Washington, D.C.	Richard K. Meade	March 4, 1843 (Previously served March 4, 1835 – March 3, 1841)	May 15, 1797	Lawrenceville, Virginia	30th
Jesse Speight	Democratic	Mississippi (Senator)	May 1, 1847	51	Erysipelas	Columbus, Mississippi	Friendship Cemetery, Columbus, Mississippi	Jefferson Davis	March 4, 1845 (U.S. House tenure March 4, 1829 – March 3, 1837)	September 22, 1795	Greene County, North Carolina	30th
Edward Bradley	Democratic	Michigan (2nd district)	August 5, 1847	39	Unknown	New York City, New York	Congressional Cemetery, Washington, D.C.	Charles E. Stuart	March 4, 1847	April 1808	East Bloomfield, New York	30th
Jabez W. Huntington	Whig	Connecticut (Senator)	November 1, 1847	58	Inflammation of the bowels	Norwich, Connecticut	Old Norwich Town Cemetery, Norwich, Connecticut	Roger S. Baldwin	May 4, 1840 (U.S. House tenure March 4, 1829 – August 16, 1834)	November 8, 1788	Norwich, Connecticut	30th
John Fairfield	Democratic	Maine (Senator)	December 24, 1847	50	Attributed to copper sulfate poisoning	Washington, D.C.	Laurel Hill Cemetery, Saco, Maine	Wyman B. S. Moor	December 4, 1843 (U.S. House tenure March 4, 1835 – December 24, 1838)	January 30, 1797	Saco, Maine	30th
John Westbrook Hornbeck	Whig	Pennsylvania (6th district)	January 16, 1848	43	Unknown	Allentown, Pennsylvania	Allentown Cemetery, Allentown, Pennsylvania	Samuel Augustus Bridges	March 4, 1847	January 24, 1804	Montague Township, New Jersey	30th
John Quincy Adams	Whig	Massachusetts (8th district)	February 23, 1848	80	Cerebral hemorrhage	Washington, D.C.	United First Parish Church, Quincy, Massachusetts	Horace Mann	March 4, 1831 (U.S. Senate tenure March 4, 1803 – June 8, 1808)	July 11, 1767	Braintree, Massachusetts (present Quincy)	30th
John M. Holley	Whig	New York (27th district)	March 8, 1848	45	Unknown	Jacksonville, Florida	Rural Cemetery, Lyons, New York	Esbon Blackmar	March 4, 1847	November 10, 1802	Salisbury, Connecticut	30th
James A. Black	Democratic	South Carolina (1st district)	April 3, 1848	54/55	Pneumonia	Washington, D.C.	First Presbyterian Church, Columbia, South Carolina	Daniel Wallace	March 4, 1843	Sometime in 1793	Ninety-Six District, South Carolina	30th
Chester Ashley	Democratic	Arkansas (Senator)	April 29, 1848	57	Peritonsillar abscess and a liver ailment	Washington, D.C.	Mount Holly Cemetery, Little Rock, Arkansas	William K. Sebastian	November 8, 1844	June 1, 1790	Amherst, Massachusetts	30th
Dixon Hall Lewis	Democratic	Alabama (Senator)	October 25, 1848	46	Attributed to obesity	New York City, New York	Green-Wood Cemetery, Brooklyn, New York	Benjamin Fitzpatrick	April 22, 1844 (U.S. House tenure March 4, 1829 – April 22, 1844)	August 10, 1802	Dinwiddie County, Virginia	30th
Alexander D. Sims	Democratic	South Carolina (4th district)	November 22, 1848	45	Unknown	Kingstree, South Carolina	First Baptist Cemetery, Darlington, South Carolina	John McQueen	March 4, 1845	June 12, 1803	Virginia	30th
Rodolphus Dickinson	Democratic	Ohio (6th district)	March 20, 1849	51	Unknown	Washington, D.C.	Oakwood Cemetery, Fremont, Ohio	Amos E. Wood	March 4, 1847	December 28, 1797	Hatfield, Massachusetts	31st
Alexander Newman	Democratic	Virginia (15th district)	September 8, 1849	44	Cholera	Pittsburgh, Pennsylvania	Old First Street Cemetery, Moundsville, Virginia	Thomas Haymond	March 4, 1849	October 5, 1804	Orange, Virginia	31st
John C. Calhoun	Democratic	South Carolina (Senator)	March 31, 1850	68	Tuberculosis	Washington, D.C.	St. Philip's Episcopal Church, Charleston, South Carolina	Franklin Elmore	November 26, 1845 (U.S. House tenure March 4, 1811 – November 3, 1817/previously served December 29, 1832 – March 4, 1843)	March 18, 1782	Abbeville, South Carolina	31st
Franklin H. Elmore	Democratic	South Carolina (Senator)	May 29, 1850	50	Neuralgia	Washington, D.C.	First Presbyterian Church, Columbia, South Carolina	Robert W. Barnwell	April 11, 1850 (U.S. House tenure December 10, 1836 – March 3, 1839)	October 15, 1799	Laurens District, South Carolina	31st
Daniel P. King	Whig	Massachusetts (2nd district)	July 25, 1850	49	Dysentery	South Danvers, Massachusetts	King Cemetery, Peabody, Massachusetts	Robert Rantoul Jr.	March 4, 1843	January 8, 1801	South Danvers, Massachusetts	31st
Henry Nes	Whig	Pennsylvania (15th district)	September 10, 1850	51	Unknown	York County, Pennsylvania	Prospect Hill Cemetery, York, Pennsylvania	Joel B. Danner	March 4, 1847 (previously served March 4, 1843 – March 3, 1845)	May 20, 1799	York, Pennsylvania	31st
Chester Pierce Butler	Whig	Pennsylvania (11th district)	October 5, 1850	52	Typhoid fever	Philadelphia, Pennsylvania	Hollenbeck Cemetery, Wilkes-Barre, Pennsylvania	John Brisbin	March 4, 1847	March 21, 1798	Wilkes-Barre, Pennsylvania	31st
John H. Harmanson	Democratic	Louisiana (2nd district)	October 24, 1850	47	Unknown	New Orleans, Louisiana	Moreau Plantation Cemetery, Pointe Coupee Parish, Louisiana	Alexander G. Penn	March 4, 1845	January 15, 1803	Norfolk, Virginia	31st
Amos E. Wood	Democratic	Ohio (6th district)	November 19, 1850	40	Erysipelas	Fort Wayne, Indiana	Woodville Cemetery, Woodville, Ohio	John Bell	December 3, 1849	January 2, 1810	Ellisburg, New York	31st
David S. Kaufman	Democratic	Texas (1st district)	January 31, 1851	37	Heart disease	Washington, D.C.	Texas State Cemetery, Austin, Texas	Richardson A. Scurry	March 30, 1846	December 13, 1813	Boiling Springs, Pennsylvania	31st
Charles Andrews	Democratic	Maine (4th district)	April 30, 1852	38	Unknown	Paris, Maine	Hillside Cemetery, Paris, Maine	Isaac Reed	March 4, 1851	February 11, 1814	Paris, Maine	32nd
Henry Clay	Whig	Kentucky (Senator)	June 29, 1852	75	Tuberculosis	Washington, D.C.	Lexington Cemetery, Lexington, Kentucky	David Meriwether	March 4, 1849 (U.S. House tenure March 4, 1811 – January 19, 1814, March 4, 1815 – March 3, 1821 and March 4, 1823 – March 3, 1825/previously served December 29, 1806 – March 3, 1807, January 4, 1810 – March 3, 1811 and November 10, 1831 – March 31, 1842)	April 12, 1777	Hanover County, Virginia	32nd
Robert Rantoul Jr.	Democratic	Massachusetts (2nd district)	August 7, 1852	47	Erysipelas	Washington, D.C.	Central Cemetery, Beverly, Massachusetts	Charles Sumner	March 4, 1851 (U.S. Senate tenure February 1, 1851 – March 3, 1851)	August 5, 1805	Beverly, Massachusetts	32nd
Orin Fowler	Whig	Massachusetts (9th district)	September 3, 1852	61	Bilious pneumonia	Washington, D.C.	North Burial Ground, Fall River, Massachusetts	Edward P. Little	March 4, 1849	July 29, 1791	Lebanon, Connecticut	32nd
Benjamin Thompson	Whig	Massachusetts (4th district)	September 24, 1852	54	Fever	Charlestown, Massachusetts	Congressional Cemetery, Washington, D.C.	Lorenzo Sabine	March 4, 1851 (previously served March 4, 1845 – March 3, 1847)	August 5, 1798	Charlestown, Massachusetts	32nd
James Whitcomb	Democratic	Indiana (Senator)	October 4, 1852	56	Tuberculosis	New York City, New York	Greenlawn Cemetery, Indianapolis, Indiana	Charles W. Cathcart	March 4, 1849	December 1, 1795	Windsor County, Vermont	32nd
William Upham	Whig	Vermont (Senator)	January 14, 1853	60	Tuberculosis	Washington, D.C.	Congressional Cemetery, Washington, D.C.	Samuel S. Phelps	March 4, 1843	August 5, 1792	Leicester, Massachusetts	32nd
Alexander H. Buell	Democratic	New York (17th district)	January 29, 1853	51	Erysipelas	Washington, D.C.	Episcopal Cemetery, Fairfield, New York	Bishop Perkins	March 4, 1851	July 14, 1801	Fairfield, New York	32nd
Charles G. Atherton	Democratic	New Hampshire (Senator)	November 15, 1853	49	Tuberculosis	Manchester, New Hampshire	Nashua Cemetery, Nashua, New Hampshire	Jared W. Williams	March 4, 1853 (U.S. House tenure March 4, 1837 – March 3, 1843/previously served March 4, 1843 – March 3, 1849)	July 4, 1804	Amherst, New Hampshire	33rd
Brookins Campbell	Democratic	Tennessee (1st district)	December 25, 1853	44/45	"affection of the kidneys and spine"	Washington, D.C.	Providence Presbyterian Churchyard, Greene County, Tennessee	Nathaniel G. Taylor	March 4, 1853	Sometime in 1808	Washington County, Tennessee	33rd
Henry Augustus Muhlenberg	Democratic	Pennsylvania (8th district)	January 9, 1854	30	Congestion of the lungs	Washington, D.C.	Charles Evans Cemetery, Reading, Pennsylvania	J. Glancy Jones	March 4, 1853	July 21, 1823	Reading, Pennsylvania	33rd
John F. Snodgrass	Democratic	Virginia (11th district)	June 5, 1854	50	Apoplexy	Parkersburg, Virginia	Riverview Cemetery, Parkersburg, Virginia	Charles S. Lewis	March 4, 1853	March 2, 1804	Berkeley County, Virginia	33rd
Presley Ewing	Whig	Kentucky (3rd district)	September 27, 1854	32	Cholera	Mammoth Cave, Kentucky	Maple Grove Cemetery, Russellville, Kentucky	Francis Bristow	March 4, 1851	September 1, 1822	Russellville, Kentucky	33rd
Moses Norris Jr.	Democratic	New Hampshire (Senator)	January 11, 1855	55	Tuberculosis	Washington, D.C.	Floral Park Cemetery, Pittsfield, New Hampshire	John S. Wells	March 4, 1849 (U.S. House tenure March 4, 1843 – March 3, 1847)	November 8, 1799	Pittsfield, New Hampshire	33rd
John Gaines Miller	Whig	Missouri (5th district)	May 11, 1856	43	Unknown	Marshall, Missouri	Mount Olive Cemetery, Marshall, Missouri	Thomas Peter Akers	March 4, 1851	November 29, 1812	Danville, Kentucky	34th
Thomas H. Bayly	Democratic	Virginia (1st district)	June 23, 1856	45	Consumption	Drummondtown, Virginia	Family cemetery, Accomac, Virginia	Muscoe Russell Hunter Garnett	May 6, 1844	December 11, 1810	Drummondtown, Virginia	34th
James Meacham	Whig	Vermont (1st district)	August 23, 1856	46	"congestion of the brain and lungs	Rutland, Vermont	West Cemetery, Middlebury, Vermont	George Tisdale Hodges	December 3, 1849	August 16, 1810	Rutland (town), Vermont	34th
John M. Clayton	Whig	Delaware (Senator)	November 9, 1856	60	Following a fever attack	Dover, Delaware	Old Presbyterian Cemetery, Dover, Delaware	Joseph P. Comegys	March 4, 1853 (previously served March 4, 1829 – December 29, 1836 and March 4, 1845 – February 23, 1849)	July 24, 1796	Dagsboro, Delaware	34th
Preston Brooks	Democratic	South Carolina (4th district)	January 27, 1857	37	Peritonsillar abscess	Washington D.C.	Edgefield, South Carolina	Milledge L. Bonham	August 1, 1856 (previously served March 4, 1853 – July 15, 1856)	August 5, 1819	Edgefield County, South Carolina	34th
Samuel Brenton	Democratic	Indiana (10th district)	March 29, 1857	46	Unknown	Fort Wayne, Indiana	Lindenwood Cemetery, Fort Wayne, Indiana	Charles Case	March 4, 1855 (previously served March 4, 1851 – March 3, 1853)	November 22, 1810	Gallatin County, Kentucky	35th
John Gallagher Montgomery	Democratic	Pennsylvania (12th district)	April 24, 1857	51	Victim of the National Hotel disease	Danville, Pennsylvania	Episcopal Cemetery, Danville, Pennsylvania	Paul Leidy	March 4, 1857	June 27, 1805	Northumberland, Pennsylvania	35th
Andrew Pickens Butler	Democratic	South Carolina (Senator)	May 25, 1857	60	Dropsy	Edgefield, South Carolina	Butler Family Cemetery, Saluda County, South Carolina	James H. Hammond	December 4, 1846	November 18, 1796	Edgefield, South Carolina	35th
James Bell	Whig	New Hampshire (Senator)	May 26, 1857	52	Unknown	Laconia, New Hampshire	Exeter Cemetery, Exeter, New Hampshire	Daniel Clark	July 30, 1855	November 13, 1804	Francestown, New Hampshire	35th
Thomas Jefferson Rusk	Democratic	Texas (Senator)	July 29, 1857	53	Suicide	Nacogdoches, Texas	Oak Grove Cemetery, Nacogdoches, Texas	James P. Henderson	February 21, 1846	December 5, 1803	Pendleton, South Carolina	35th
James Lockhart	Democratic	Indiana (1st district)	September 7, 1857	51	Consumption	Evansville, Indiana	Oak Hill Cemetery, Evansville, Indiana	William E. Niblack	March 4, 1857 (previously served March 4, 1851 – March 3, 1853)	February 13, 1806	Auburn, New York	35th
Josiah J. Evans	Democratic	South Carolina (Senator)	May 6, 1858	71	Heart disease	Washington, D.C.	Ancestral home, Society Hill, South Carolina	Arthur P. Hayne	March 4, 1853	November 27, 1786	Marlboro County, South Carolina	35th
J. Pinckney Henderson	Democratic	Texas (Senator)	June 4, 1858	50	Consumption	Washington, D.C.	Texas State Cemetery, Austin, Texas	Matthias Ward	November 9, 1857	March 31, 1808	Lincolnton, North Carolina	35th
John A. Quitman	Democratic	Mississippi (5th district)	July 17, 1858	59	"presumably from the effects of National Hotel disease"	Natchez, Mississippi	Natchez City Cemetery, Natchez, Mississippi	John J. McRae	March 4, 1855	September 17, 1798	Rhinebeck, New York	35th
Thomas L. Harris	Democratic	Illinois (6th district)	November 24, 1858	42	Consumption	Springfield, Illinois	Rose Hill Cemetery, Petersburg, Illinois	James C. Allen	March 4, 1855 (previously served March 4, 1849 – March 3, 1851)	October 29, 1816	Norwich, Connecticut	35th
Cyrus Spink	Republican	Ohio (14th district)	May 31, 1859	66	Apoplexy	Wooster, Ohio	Wooster Cemetery, Wooster, Ohio	Harrison G. O. Blake	March 4, 1859	March 24, 1793	Berkshire County, Massachusetts	36th
William Goode	Democratic	Virginia (4th district)	July 3, 1859	60	Consumption	Boydton, Virginia	Wheatland, Boydton, Virginia	Roger Atkinson Pryor	March 4, 1853 (previously served March 4, 1841 – March 3, 1843)	September 16, 1798	Inglewood, Virginia	36th
David C. Broderick	Democratic	California (Senator)	September 16, 1859	39	Killed in a duel	San Francisco, California	Cypress Lawn Memorial Park, Colma, California	Henry P. Haun	March 4, 1857	February 4, 1820	Washington, D.C.	36th
Silas M. Burroughs	Republican	New York (31st district)	June 3, 1860	49	Unknown	Medina, New York	Boxwood Cemetery, Medina, New York	Edwin R. Reynolds	March 4, 1857	July 16, 1810	Ovid, New York	36th
John Schwartz	Democratic	Pennsylvania (8th district)	June 20, 1860	66	Jaundice	Washington, D.C.	Charles Evans Cemetery, Reading, Pennsylvania	Jacob K. McKenty	March 4, 1859	October 27, 1793	Northumberland County, Pennsylvania	36th
George W. Scranton	Republican	Pennsylvania (12th district)	March 24, 1861	49	Tuberculosis	Scranton, Pennsylvania	Dunmore Cemetery	Hendrick Bradley Wright	March 4, 1859	May 11, 1811	Madison, Connecticut	37th
Stephen A. Douglas	Democratic	Illinois (Senator)	June 3, 1861	48	Typhoid fever	Chicago, Illinois	636 E. 35th St. Chicago, IL	Orville H. Browning	March 4, 1847 (U.S. House tenure March 4, 1843 – March 3, 1847)	April 23, 1813	Brandon, Vermont	37th
Kinsley S. Bingham	Republican	Michigan (Senator)	October 5, 1861	52	Apoplexy	Green Oak Township, Michigan	Old Village Cemetery, Brighton, Michigan	Jacob M. Howard	March 4, 1859 (U.S. House tenure March 4, 1847 – March 3, 1851)	December 16, 1808	Camillus, New York	37th
Edward D. Baker	Republican	Oregon (Senator)	October 21, 1861	50	Killed in action, Battle of Ball's Bluff	Ball's Bluff, Loudoun County, Virginia	San Francisco National Cemetery, California	Benjamin Stark	October 2, 1860 (U.S. House tenure March 4, 1845 – January 12, 1847 and March 4, 1849 – March 3, 1851)	February 24, 1811	London, England	37th
Thomas B. Cooper	Democratic	Pennsylvania (7th district)	April 4, 1862	38	Unknown	Coopersburg, Pennsylvania	Woodland Cemetery, Coopersburg, Pennsylvania	John D. Stiles	March 4, 1861	December 29, 1823	Coopersburg, Pennsylvania	37th
Goldsmith Bailey	Republican	Massachusetts (9th district)	May 8, 1862	38	Consumption	Fitchburg, Massachusetts	Laurel Hill Cemetery, Fitchburg, Massachusetts	Amasa Walker	March 4, 1861	July 17, 1823	East Westmoreland, New Hampshire	37th
John Renshaw Thomson	Democratic	New Jersey (Senator)	September 12, 1862	61	Unknown	Princeton, New Jersey	Princeton Cemetery, Princeton, New Jersey	Richard S. Field	March 4, 1853	September 25, 1800	Philadelphia, Pennsylvania	37th
Luther Hanchett	Republican	Wisconsin (2nd district)	November 24, 1862	37	"brain fever"	Plover, Wisconsin	Plover Cemetery, Plover, Wisconsin	Walter D. McIndoe	March 4, 1861	October 25, 1825	Middlebury, Ohio	37th
James Pearce	Democratic	Maryland (Senator)	December 20, 1862	57	Heart disease	Chestertown, Maryland	New Chester Cemetery, Chestertown, Maryland	Thomas H. Hicks	March 4, 1843 (U.S. House tenure March 4, 1835 – March 3, 1839 and March 4, 1841 – March 3, 1843)	December 14, 1805	Alexandria, Virginia	37th
John W. Noell	Democratic	Missouri (3rd district)	March 14, 1863	47	Typhoid fever	Washington, D.C.	St. Mary's Cemetery, Perryville, Missouri	John Guier Scott	March 4, 1859	February 22, 1816	Bedford, Virginia	38th
William Temple	Democratic	Delaware (at-large)	May 28, 1863	49	Unknown	Smyrna, Delaware	St. Peter's Episcopal Church Cemetery, Smyrna, Delaware	Nathaniel B. Smithers	March 4, 1863	February 28, 1814	Queen Anne's County, Maryland	38th
Lemuel J. Bowden	Republican	Virginia (Senator)	January 2, 1864	48	Unknown	Washington, D.C.	Congressional Cemetery, Washington, D.C.	John F. Lewis	March 4, 1863	January 16, 1815	Williamsburg, Virginia	38th
Owen Lovejoy	Republican	Illinois (5th district)	March 25, 1864	53	"affection of the liver and kidneys" and heart	Brooklyn, New York	Oakland Cemetery, Princeton, Illinois	Ebon C. Ingersoll	March 4, 1857	January 6, 1811	Albion, Maine	38th
Thomas Holliday Hicks	Republican	Maryland (Senator)	February 14, 1865	66	Unknown	Washington, D.C.	Cambridge Cemetery, Cambridge, Maryland	John A. J. Creswell	December 29, 1862	September 2, 1798	East New Market, Maryland	38th
Orlando Kellogg	Republican	New York (16th district)	August 24, 1865	56	Unknown	Elizabethtown, New York	Riverside Cemetery, Elizabethtown, New York	Robert S. Hale	March 4, 1863 (previously served March 4, 1847 – March 3, 1849)	June 18, 1809	Elizabethtown, New York	39th
Jacob Collamer	Republican	Vermont (Senator)	November 9, 1865	74	Congestion of the lungs	Woodstock, Vermont	River Street Cemetery, Woodstock, Vermont	Luke P. Poland	March 4, 1855 (U.S. House tenure March 4, 1843 – March 3, 1849)	January 8, 1791	Troy, New York	39th
Solomon Foot	Republican	Vermont (Senator)	March 28, 1866	63	Following an attack of jaundice	Washington, D.C.	Evergreen Cemetery, Rutland, Vermont	George F. Edmunds	March 4, 1851 (U.S. House tenure March 4, 1843 – March 3, 1847)	November 19, 1802	Cornwall, Vermont	39th
James Humphrey	Republican	New York (3rd district)	June 16, 1866	54	Unknown	Brooklyn, New York	Green-Wood Cemetery, Brooklyn, New York	John W. Hunter	March 4, 1865 (previously served March 4, 1859 – March 3, 1861)	October 9, 1811	Fairfield, Connecticut	39th
James Henry Lane	Republican	Kansas (Senator)	July 11, 1866	52	Suicide	Leavenworth, Kansas	U.S.	Edmund G. Ross	April 4, 1861 (U.S. House tenure March 4, 1853 – March 3, 1855)	June 22, 1814	Lawrenceburg, Indiana	39th
Henry Grider	Democratic	Kentucky (3rd district)	September 7, 1866	70	Unknown	Bowling Green, Kentucky	Old College Street Cemetery, Bowling Green, Kentucky	Elijah Hise	March 4, 1861 (previously served March 4, 1843 – March 3, 1847)	July 16, 1796	Garrard County, Kentucky	39th
William Wright	Democratic	New Jersey (Senator)	November 1, 1866	71	Unknown	Flemington, New Jersey	Mount Pleasant Cemetery, Newark, New Jersey	Frederick T. Frelinghuysen	March 4, 1863 (U.S. House tenure March 4, 1843 – March 3, 1847/previously served March 4, 1853 – March 3, 1859)	November 13, 1794	Clarkstown, New York	39th
Philip Johnson	Democratic	Pennsylvania (11th district)	January 29, 1867	49	"congestion of the liver"	Washington, D.C.	Easton Cemetery, Easton, Pennsylvania	Daniel Myers Van Auken	March 4, 1861	January 17, 1818	Knowlton Township, New Jersey	39th
George R. Riddle	Democratic	Delaware (Senator)	March 29, 1867	49/50	Unknown	Washington, D.C.	Wilmington and Brandywine Cemetery, Wilmington, Delaware	James A. Bayard Jr.	February 2, 1864 (U.S. House tenure March 4, 1851 – March 3, 1855)	Sometime in 1817	New Castle, Delaware	40th
Elijah Hise	Democratic	Kentucky (3rd district)	May 8, 1867	64	Suicide	Russellville, Kentucky	Maple Grove Cemetery, Russellville, Kentucky	Jacob Golladay	December 3, 1866	July 4, 1802	Allegheny County, Pennsylvania	40th
Charles Denison	Democratic	Pennsylvania (12th district)	June 27, 1867	49	Unknown	Wilkes-Barre, Pennsylvania	Forty Fort Cemetery, Kingston, Pennsylvania	George W. Woodward	March 4, 1863	January 23, 1818	Wyoming Valley, Pennsylvania	40th
Thomas E. Noell	Democratic	Missouri (3rd district)	October 3, 1867	28	Inflammation of the bowels	St. Louis, Missouri	St. Mary's Cemetery, Perryville, Missouri	James Robinson McCormick	March 4, 1865	April 3, 1839	Perryville, Missouri	40th
Cornelius S. Hamilton	Republican	Ohio (8th district)	December 22, 1867	46	Murdered	Marysville, Ohio	Oakdale Cemetery, Marysville, Ohio	John Beatty	March 4, 1867	January 2, 1821	Gratiot, Ohio	40th
Thaddeus Stevens	Republican	Pennsylvania (9th district)	August 11, 1868	76	Heart disease, dropsy and diarrheal disease	Washington, D.C.	Shreiner-Concord Cemetery, Lancaster, Pennsylvania	Oliver Dickey	March 4, 1859 (previously served March 4, 1849 – March 3, 1853)	April 4, 1792	Danville, Vermont	40th
Darwin A. Finney	Republican	Pennsylvania (20th district)	August 25, 1868	54	Bright's disease	Brussels, Belgium	Greendale Cemetery, Meadville, Pennsylvania	Solomon Newton Pettis	March 4, 1867	August 11, 1814	Shrewsbury, Vermont	40th
James Mann	Democratic	Louisiana (2nd district)	August 26, 1868	46	Congestion of the brain	New Orleans, Louisiana	U.S.	Lionel A. Sheldon	July 18, 1868	June 22, 1822	Gorham, Maine	40th
James M. Hinds	Republican	Arkansas (2nd district)	October 22, 1868	34	Assassinated	Monroe County, Arkansas	Evergreen Cemetery, Salem, New York	District inactive	June 22, 1868	December 5, 1833	Hebron, New York	40th
Thomas Haughey	Democratic	Alabama (6th district)	August 5, 1869	42/43	Assassinated	Courtland, Alabama	Green Cemetery, Pinson, Alabama	William Crawford Sherrod	July 21, 1868	Sometime in 1826	Glasgow, Scotland	41st
William P. Fessenden	Republican	Maine (Senator)	September 8, 1869	62	Inflammation of the bowels	Portland, Maine	Evergreen Cemetery, Portland, Maine	Lot M. Morrill	March 4, 1865 (U.S. House tenure March 4, 1841 – March 3, 1843/previously served February 1, 1854 – July 1, 1864)	October 16, 1806	Boscawen, New Hampshire	41st
Benjamin F. Hopkins	Republican	Wisconsin (2nd district)	January 1, 1870	40	Paralysis and a "complication of diseases"	Milwaukee, Wisconsin	Forest Hill Cemetery, Madison, Wisconsin	David Atwood	March 4, 1867	April 22, 1829	Granville, New York	41st
Truman H. Hoag	Democratic	Ohio (10th district)	February 5, 1870	53	"chills and fever"	Washington, D.C.	Forest Cemetery, Toledo, Ohio	Erasmus D. Peck	March 4, 1869	April 9, 1816	Manlius, New York	41st
David Heaton	Republican	North Carolina (2nd district)	June 25, 1870	47	Unknown	Washington, D.C.	National Cemetery, New Bern, North Carolina	Joseph Dixon	July 15, 1868	March 10, 1823	Hamilton, Ohio	41st
Daniel S. Norton	Republican	Minnesota (Senator)	July 14, 1870	41	Consumption	Washington, D.C.	Green Mount Cemetery, Baltimore, Maryland	William Windom	March 4, 1865	April 12, 1829	Mount Vernon, Ohio	41st
William Smyth	Republican	Iowa (2nd district)	September 30, 1870	46	Inflammation of the bowels	Marion, Iowa	Oak Shade Cemetery, Marion, Iowa	William P. Wolf	March 4, 1869	January 3, 1824	Eden, Ireland	41st
Robert Ridgway	Whig	Virginia (5th district)	October 16, 1870	47	Unknown	Amherst, Virginia	Family cemetery, Amherst, Virginia	Richard T.W. Duke	January 27, 1870	April 21, 1823	Lynchburg, Virginia	41st
John Covode	Whig	Pennsylvania (21st district)	January 11, 1871	62	Heart disease	Harrisburg, Pennsylvania	U.S.	Henry D. Foster	February 9, 1870 (previously served March 4, 1855 – March 3, 1863 and March 4, 1867 – March 3, 1869)	March 17, 1808	Fairfield Township, Westmoreland County, Pennsylvania	41st
James McCleery	Republican	Louisiana (4th district)	November 5, 1871	33	Consumption	New York City, New York	Christian Church Cemetery, Cortland, Ohio	Alexander Boarman	March 4, 1871	December 2, 1837	Mecca, Ohio	42nd
Thomas J. Speer	Republican	Georgia (4th district)	August 18, 1872	34	Unknown	Barnesville, Georgia	Zebulon Street Cemetery	Erasmus W. Beck	March 4, 1871	August 31, 1837	Monroe County, Georgia	42nd
Julius L. Strong	Republican	Connecticut (1st district)	September 7, 1872	43	Cerebro-spinal meningitis	Hartford, Connecticut	Cedar Hill Cemetery, Hartford, Connecticut	Joseph R. Hawley	March 4, 1869	November 8, 1828	Bolton, Connecticut	42nd
Garrett Davis	Democratic	Kentucky (Senator)	September 22, 1872	71	"Gangrenous affection of the lungs"	Paris, Kentucky	Paris Cemetery, Paris, Kentucky	Willis B. Machen	December 23, 1861 (U.S. House tenure March 4, 1839 – March 3, 1847)	September 10, 1801	Mount Sterling, Kentucky	42nd
James Brooks	Democratic	New York (6th district)	April 30, 1873	62	Stomach cancer	Washington, D.C.	Green-Wood Cemetery, Brooklyn, New York	Samuel S. Cox	March 4, 1867 (previously served March 4, 1849 – March 3, 1853 and March 4, 1863 – April 7, 1866)	November 10, 1810	Portland, Maine	43rd
William Whiting	Republican	Massachusetts (3rd district)	June 29, 1873	60	Enteritis and Nephritis	Boston, Massachusetts	Sleepy Hollow Cemetery, Concord, Massachusetts	Henry L. Pierce	March 4, 1873	March 3, 1813	Concord, Massachusetts	43rd
Joseph G. Wilson	Republican	Oregon (at-large)	July 2, 1873	46	Paralysis	Marietta, Ohio	Pioneer Cemetery, The Dalles, Oregon	James W. Nesmith	March 4, 1873	December 13, 1826	Acworth, New Hampshire	43rd
Wilder D. Foster	Republican	Michigan (5th district)	September 20, 1873	54	"Dropsy of the chest"	Grand Rapids, Michigan	Fulton Street Cemetery, Grand Rapids, Michigan	William B. Williams	December 4, 1871	January 8, 1819	Orange County, New York	43rd
Charles Sumner	Republican	Massachusetts (Senator)	March 11, 1874	63	Heart attack	Washington, D.C.	Mount Auburn Cemetery, Cambridge, Massachusetts	William B. Washburn	April 24, 1851	January 6, 1811	Boston, Massachusetts	43rd
David B. Mellish	Republican	New York (9th district)	May 23, 1874	43	Died of unknown causes while under psychiatric care	Washington, D.C.	Hillside Cemetery, Auburn, Massachusetts	Richard Schell	March 4, 1873	January 2, 1831	Oxford, Massachusetts	43rd
John B. Rice	Republican	Illinois (1st district)	December 17, 1874	65	Unknown	Chicago, Illinois	Rosehill Cemetery, Chicago, Illinois	Bernard G. Caulfield	March 4, 1873	May 28, 1809	Easton, Maryland	43rd
Alvah Crocker	Republican	Massachusetts (10th district)	December 26, 1874	73	Acute bronchitis; congestion of the lung	Fitchburg, Massachusetts	Laurel Hill Cemetery, Fitchburg, Massachusetts	Charles A. Stevens	January 2, 1872	October 14, 1801	Leominster, Massachusetts	43rd
Samuel F. Hersey	Republican	Maine (4th district)	February 3, 1875	62	Unknown	Bangor, Maine	Mount Hope Cemetery, Bangor, Maine	Harris M. Plaisted	March 4, 1873	April 12, 1812	Sumner, Maine	43rd
William A. Buckingham	Republican	Connecticut (Senator)	February 5, 1875	70	Rheumatic fever	Norwich, Connecticut	Yantic Cemetery, Norwich, Connecticut	William W. Eaton	March 4, 1869	May 28, 1804	Lebanon, Connecticut	43rd
Samuel Hooper	Republican	Massachusetts (4th district)	February 14, 1875	67	Pneunomia	Washington, D.C.	Oak Hill Cemetery, Washington, D.C.	Josiah G. Abbott	December 2, 1861	February 3, 1808	Marblehead, Massachusetts	43rd
James Buffington	Republican	Massachusetts (1st district)	March 7, 1875	57	Unknown	Fall River, Massachusetts	Oak Grove Cemetery, Fall River, Massachusetts	William W. Crapo	March 4, 1869 (previously served March 4, 1855 – March 3, 1863)	March 16, 1817	Fall River, Massachusetts	44th
George A. La Dow	Democratic	Oregon (at-large)	May 1, 1875	49	Rheumatism of the heart	Pendleton, Oregon	Pioneer Park Cemetery, Pendleton, Oregon	Lafayette Lane	March 4, 1875	March 18, 1826	Syracuse, New York	44th
Andrew Johnson	Democratic	Tennessee (Senator)	July 31, 1875	66	Paralysis and heart disease	Elizabethton, Tennessee	Andrew Johnson National Cemetery, Greeneville, Tennessee	David M. Key	March 4, 1875 (U.S. House tenure March 4, 1843 – March 3, 1853/previously served October 8, 1857 – March 4, 1862)	December 29, 1808	Raleigh, North Carolina	44th
Samuel McClary Fite	Democratic	Tennessee (4th district)	October 23, 1875	59	"neuralgia of the stomach and chest"	Hot Springs, Arkansas	Mount Olivet Cemetery, Nashville, Tennessee	Haywood Y. Riddle	March 4, 1875	June 12, 1816	Smith County, Tennessee	44th
Orris S. Ferry	Republican	Connecticut (Senator)	November 21, 1875	52	Spine disease	Norwalk, Connecticut	Union Cemetery, Norwalk, Connecticut	James E. English	March 4, 1867 (U.S. House tenure March 4, 1859 – March 3, 1861)	August 15, 1823	Bethel, Connecticut	44th
Henry H. Starkweather	Republican	Connecticut (3rd district)	January 28, 1876	49	Pneumonia	Washington, D.C.	U.S.	John T. Wait	March 4, 1867	April 29, 1826	Preston, Connecticut	44th
Edward Y. Parsons	Democratic	Kentucky (5th district)	July 8, 1876	33	"congestion of the brain"	Washington, D.C.	Cave Hill Cemetery, Louisville, Kentucky	Henry Watterson	March 4, 1875	December 12, 1842	Middletown, Kentucky	44th
Allen T. Caperton	Democratic	West Virginia (Senator)	July 26, 1876	65	Angina pectoris	Washington, D.C.	Green Hill Cemetery, Union, West Virginia	Samuel Price	March 4, 1875	November 21, 1810	Union, Virginia	44th
Michael C. Kerr	Democratic	Indiana (3rd district)	August 19, 1876	49	"Consumption of the bowels"	Rockbridge County, Virginia	U.S.	Nathan T. Carr	March 4, 1875 (previously served March 4, 1865 – March 3, 1873)	March 15, 1827	Titusville, Pennsylvania	44th
Lewis V. Bogy	Democratic	Missouri (Senator)	September 20, 1877	64	Malaria, followed by liver tumor	St. Louis, Missouri	Calvary Cemetery, St. Louis, Missouri	David H. Armstrong	March 4, 1873	April 9, 1813	Ste. Genevieve, Missouri	45th
Oliver P. Morton	Republican	Indiana (Senator)	November 1, 1877	54	"paralysis of the nervous centre"	Indianapolis, Indiana	Crown Hill Cemetery, Indianapolis, Indiana	Daniel W. Voorhees	March 4, 1867	August 4, 1823	Wayne County, Indiana	45th
John E. Leonard	Republican	Louisiana (5th district)	March 15, 1878	32	Yellow fever	Havana, Cuba	Friends' (Hicksite) Cemetery, Middletown Township, Delaware County, Pennsylvania	J. Smith Young	March 4, 1877	September 22, 1845	Fairville, Pennsylvania	45th
Terence J. Quinn	Democratic	New York (16th district)	June 18, 1878	41	Unknown	Albany, New York	St. Agnes Cemetery, Menands, New York	John M. Bailey	March 4, 1877	October 16, 1836	Albany, New York	45th
Frank Welch	Republican	Nebraska (1st district)	September 4, 1878	43	Apoplexy	Neligh, Nebraska	Forest Hills Cemetery, Jamaica Plain, Boston, Massachusetts	Thomas Jefferson Majors	March 4, 1877	February 10, 1835	Charlestown, Massachusetts	45th
Alpheus S. Williams	Democratic	Michigan (1st district)	December 21, 1878	68	Stroke	Washington, D.C.	Elmwood Cemetery, Detroit, Michigan	John S. Newberry	March 4, 1875	September 29, 1810	Deep River, Connecticut	45th
Beverly B. Douglas	Democratic	Virginia (1st district)	December 22, 1878	56	"inflammation of the bowels"	Washington, D.C.	Family burying ground, Aylett, Virginia	Richard L. T. Beale	March 4, 1875	December 21, 1822	Providence Forge, Virginia	45th
Julian Hartridge	Democratic	Georgia (1st district)	January 8, 1879	49	Pneumonia	Washington, D.C.	Laurel Grove Cemetery, Savannah, Georgia	William Bennett Fleming	March 4, 1875	September 29, 1829	Savannah, Georgia	45th
Gustav Schleicher	Democratic	Texas (6th district)	January 10, 1879	55	Erysipelas	Washington, D.C.	San Antonio National Cemetery, San Antonio, Texas	Christopher C. Upson	March 4, 1875	November 19, 1823	Darmstadt, Hesse	45th
Rush Clark	Republican	Iowa (5th district)	April 29, 1879	44	Meningitis	Washington, D.C.	Oakland Cemetery, Iowa City, Iowa	William G. Thompson	March 4, 1877	October 1, 1834	Schellsburg, Pennsylvania	46th
Zachariah Chandler	Republican	Michigan (Senator)	November 1, 1879	65	"Hemorrhage of the brain"	Chicago, Illinois	Elmwood Cemetery, Detroit, Michigan	Henry P. Baldwin	February 22, 1879 (previously served March 4, 1857 – March 3, 1875)	December 10, 1813added	Bedford, New Hampshire	46th
Alfred Morrison Lay	Democratic	Missouri (7th district)	December 8, 1879	43	Paralysis	Washington, D.C.	Woodlawn Cemetery, Jefferson City, Missouri	John F. Philips	March 4, 1879	May 20, 1836	Lewis County, Missouri	46th
George S. Houston	Democratic	Alabama (Senator)	December 31, 1879	68	"nervous prostration and fatty degeneration of the heart"	Athens, Alabama	Athens City Cemetery, Athens, Alabama	Luke Pryor	March 4, 1879 (U.S. House tenure March 4, 1841 – March 3, 1849 and March 4, 1851 – January 21, 1861)	January 17, 1811	Franklin, Tennessee	46th
Evarts W. Farr	Republican	New Hampshire (3rd district)	November 30, 1880	40	Pneumonia	Littleton, New Hampshire	Glenwood Cemetery, Littleton, New Hampshire	Ossian Ray	March 4, 1879	October 10, 1840	Littleton, New Hampshire	46th
Fernando Wood	Democratic	New York (9th district)	February 14, 1881	68	"Uremic poison"	Hot Springs, Arkansas	U.S.	John Hardy	March 4, 1867 (previously served March 4, 1841 – March 3, 1843 and March 4, 1863 – March 3, 1865)	June 14, 1812	Philadelphia, Pennsylvania	46th
Matthew H. Carpenter	Republican	Wisconsin (Senator)	February 24, 1881	56	Bright's disease	Washington, D.C.	Forest Home Cemetery, Milwaukee, Wisconsin	Angus Cameron	March 4, 1879 (previously served March 4, 1869 – March 3, 1875)	December 22, 1824	Moretown, Vermont	46th
Michael P. O'Connor	Democratic	South Carolina (2nd district)	April 26, 1881	49	Cancer	Charleston, South Carolina	St. Lawrence Cemetery, Charleston, South Carolina	Edmund W.M. Mackey	March 4, 1879	September 29, 1831	Beaufort, South Carolina	47th
Ambrose Burnside	Republican	Rhode Island (Senator)	September 13, 1881	57	Heart attack	Bristol, Rhode Island	Swan Point Cemetery, Providence, Rhode Island	Nelson W. Aldrich	March 4, 1875	May 23, 1824	Liberty, Indiana	47th
Thomas Allen	Democratic	Missouri (2nd district)	April 8, 1882	68	Bladder cancer	Washington, D.C.	Pittsfield Cemetery, Pittsfield, Massachusetts	James Henry McLean	March 4, 1881	August 29, 1813	Pittsfield, Massachusetts	47th
Robert M. A. Hawk	Republican	Illinois (5th district)	June 29, 1882	43	Apoplexy	Washington, D.C.	Oak Hill Cemetery, Mount Carroll, Illinois	Robert R. Hitt	March 4, 1879	April 23, 1839	Rushville, Indiana	47th
Benjamin Harvey Hill	Democratic	Georgia (Senator)	August 16, 1882	58	Cancer of the tongue	Gurley, Alabama	Oakland Cemetery, Atlanta, Georgia	Middleton Barrow	March 4, 1877 (U.S. House tenure May 5, 1875 – March 3, 1877)	September 14, 1823	Hillsboro, Georgia	47th
William M. Lowe	Republican	Alabama (8th district)	October 12, 1882	40	Tuberculosis	Huntsville, Alabama	Maple Hill Cemetery, Huntsville, Alabama	None	June 3, 1882 (previously served March 4, 1879 – March 3, 1881)	June 12, 1842	Huntsville, Alabama	47th
Jonathan T. Updegraff	Republican	Ohio (16th district)	November 30, 1882	60	Bright's disease	Mount Pleasant, Ohio	Short Creek Cemetery, Mount Pleasant, Ohio	Joseph D. Taylor	March 4, 1879	May 13, 1822	Mount Pleasant, Ohio	47th
Godlove Stein Orth	Republican	Indiana (9th district)	December 16, 1882	65	"Blood poisoning, superinduced by cancer"	Lafayette, Indiana	Greenbush Cemetery, Lafayette, Indiana	Charles T. Doxey	March 4, 1879 (previously served March 4, 1863 – March 3, 1871 and March 4, 1873 – March 3, 1875)	April 22, 1817	Lebanon, Pennsylvania	47th
John W. Shackelford	Democratic	North Carolina (3rd district)	January 18, 1883	38	"pneumonia and a complication of other diseases"	Washington D.C.	Wallace Graveyard, Richlands, North Carolina	Wharton J. Green	March 4, 1881	November 16, 1844	Richlands, North Carolina	47th
Thomas H. Herndon	Democratic	Alabama (1st district)	March 28, 1883	54	Unknown	Mobile, Alabama	Magnolia Cemetery, Mobile, Alabama	James T. Jones	March 4, 1879	July 1, 1828	Erie, Alabama	48th
Walter F. Pool	Republican	North Carolina (1st district)	August 25, 1883	32	Unknown	Elizabeth City, North Carolina	Pool Cemetery, Elizabeth City, North Carolina	Thomas G. Skinner	March 4, 1883	October 10, 1850	Elizabeth City, North Carolina	48th
Marsena E. Cutts	Republican	Iowa (6th district)	September 1, 1883	50	Tuberculosis	Oskaloosa, Iowa	Forest Cemetery, Oskaloosa, Iowa	John C. Cook	March 4, 1881	May 22, 1833	Orwell, Vermont	48th
Dudley C. Haskell	Republican	Kansas (2nd district)	December 16, 1883	41	Physicians had "different opinions regarding the nature of his illness" including Bright's disease	Washington, D.C.	Oak Hill Cemetery, Lawrence, Kansas	Edward H. Funston	March 4, 1877	March 23, 1842	Springfield, Vermont	48th
Edmund W. M. Mackey	Republican	South Carolina (7th district)	January 27, 1884	37	Inflammation of the bowels	Washington, D.C.	U.S.	Robert Smalls	May 31, 1882 (previously served March 4, 1875 – July 19, 1876)	March 8, 1846	Charleston, South Carolina	48th
Henry B. Anthony	Republican	Rhode Island (Senator)	September 2, 1884	69	Bright's disease	Providence, Rhode Island	Swan Point Cemetery, Providence, Rhode Island	William P. Sheffield	March 4, 1859	April 1, 1815	Coventry, Rhode Island	48th
John H. Evins	Democratic	South Carolina (4th district)	October 20, 1884	54	"Bright's disease, complicated by heart affections"	Spartanburg, South Carolina	Magnolia Street Cemetery, Spartanburg, South Carolina	John Bratton	March 4, 1877	July 18, 1830	Spartanburg District, South Carolina	48th
William A. Duncan	Democratic	Pennsylvania (19th district)	November 14, 1884	48	Consumption	Gettysburg, Pennsylvania	Evergreen Cemetery, Gettysburg, Pennsylvania	John Augustus Swope	March 4, 1883	February 2, 1836	Cashtown, Pennsylvania	48th
Reuben Ellwood	Republican	Illinois (5th district)	July 1, 1885	64	Cancer	Sycamore, Illinois	Elmwood Cemetery, Sycamore, Illinois	Albert J. Hopkins	March 4, 1883	February 21, 1821	Minden, New York	49th
Joseph Rankin	Democratic	Wisconsin (5th district)	January 24, 1886	52	Bright's disease	Washington, D.C.	Evergreen Cemetery, Manitowoc, Wisconsin	Thomas R. Hudd	March 4, 1883	September 25, 1833	Passaic, New Jersey	49th
John F. Miller	Republican	California (Senator)	March 8, 1886	54	Complications related to a lingering Civil War head injury	Washington, D.C.	Arlington National Cemetery, Arlington, Virginia	George Hearst	March 4, 1881	November 21, 1831	South Bend, Indiana	49th
Michael Hahn	Republican	Louisiana (2nd district)	March 15, 1886	55	Aneurysm	Washington, D.C.	Metairie Cemetery, New Orleans, Louisiana	Nathaniel Dick Wallace	March 4, 1885 (previously served December 3, 1862 – March 3, 1863)	November 24, 1830	Klingenmünster, Palatinate, Bavaria	49th
William H. Cole	Democratic	Maryland (3rd district)	July 8, 1886	49	Bright's disease	Washington, D.C.	Bonnie Brae Cemetery, Baltimore, Maryland	Harry Welles Rusk	March 4, 1885	January 11, 1837	Baltimore, Maryland	49th
Lewis Beach	Democratic	New York (15th district)	August 10, 1886	51	Typhoid fever and Bright's disease	Cornwall, New York	Green-Wood Cemetery, Brooklyn, New York	Henry Bacon	March 4, 1881	March 30, 1835	New York City, New York	49th
Austin F. Pike	Republican	New Hampshire (Senator)	October 8, 1886	66	Heart disease	Franklin, New Hampshire	Franklin Cemetery, Franklin, New Hampshire	Person C. Cheney	August 2, 1883 (U.S. House tenure March 4, 1873 – March 3, 1875)	October 16, 1819	Hebron, New Hampshire	49th
John Arnot Jr.	Democratic	New York (28th district)	November 20, 1886	55	Attributed to injuries from a previous gas explosion	Elmira, New York	Woodlawn Cemetery, Elmira, New York	Ira Davenport	March 4, 1883	March 11, 1831	Elmira, New York	49th
William T. Price	Republican	Wisconsin (8th district)	December 6, 1886	62	Cancer	Black River Falls, Wisconsin	Riverside Cemetery, Black River Falls, Wisconsin	Hugh H. Price	March 4, 1883	June 17, 1824	Huntingdon County, Pennsylvania	49th
Abraham Dowdney	Democratic	New York (12th district)	December 10, 1886	45	Apoplexy	New York City, New York	Calvary Cemetery, New York City, New York	William Bourke Cockran	March 4, 1885	October 31, 1841	Youghal, Ireland	49th
John A. Logan	Republican	Illinois (Senator)	December 26, 1886	60	"taken with rheumatism, and brain fever set in and caused his death"	Washington, D.C.	United States Soldiers' and Airmen's Home National Cemetery, Washington, D.C.	Charles B. Farwell	March 4, 1879 (U.S. House tenure March 4, 1859 – April 2, 1862 and March 4, 1867 – March 3, 1871/previously served March 4, 1871 – March 3, 1877)	February 9, 1826	Murphysboro, Illinois	49th
Edward W. Robertson	Democratic	Louisiana (6th district)	August 2, 1887	64	"bronchitis, contracted during a hunting expedition in the Parish of Livingston"	Baton Rouge, Louisiana	Magnolia Cemetery, Baton Rouge, Louisiana	Samuel Matthews Robertson	March 4, 1887 (previously served March 4, 1877 – March 3, 1883)	June 13, 1823	Nashville, Tennessee	50th
Nicholas T. Kane	Democratic	New York (19th district)	September 14, 1887	41	Tuberculosis	Albany, New York	St. Agnes Cemetery, Colonie, New York	Charles Tracey	March 4, 1887	September 12, 1846	County Waterford, Ireland	50th
Seth C. Moffatt	Republican	Michigan (11th district)	December 22, 1887	46	"Blood poison from Carbuncle"	Washington, D.C.	Oakwood Cemetery, Traverse City, Michigan	Henry W. Seymour	March 4, 1885	August 10, 1841	Battle Creek, Michigan	50th
James N. Burnes	Democratic	Missouri (4th district)	January 23, 1889	61	Paralysis	Washington, D.C.	Mount Mora Cemetery, St. Joseph, Missouri	Charles F. Booher	March 4, 1883	August 22, 1827	Marion County, Indiana	50th
Richard W. Townshend	Democratic	Illinois (19th district)	March 9, 1889	48	Pneumonia	Washington, D.C.	Rock Creek Cemetery, Washington, D.C.	James R. Williams	March 4, 1877	April 30, 1840	Upper Marlboro, Maryland	51st
Edward J. Gay	Democratic	Louisiana (3rd district)	May 30, 1889	73	General debility and inability to "assimilate properly the food taken."	Iberville Parish, Louisiana	Bellefontaine Cemetery, St. Louis, Missouri	Andrew Price	March 4, 1885	February 3, 1816	Liberty (Bedford), Virginia	51st
James Laird	Republican	Nebraska (2nd district)	August 17, 1889	40	Attributed to "blood poisoning, the result of a recent operation"	Hastings, Nebraska	Parkview Cemetery, Hastings, Nebraska	Gilbert L. Laws	March 4, 1883	June 20, 1849	Fowlerville, New York	51st
Samuel S. Cox	Democratic	New York (9th district)	September 10, 1889	64	Peritonitis	New York City, New York	Green-Wood Cemetery, Brooklyn, New York	Amos J. Cummings	November 2, 1886 (previously served March 4, 1857 – March 3, 1865, March 4, 1869 – March 3, 1873 and November 4, 1873 – May 20, 1885)	September 30, 1824	Zanesville, Ohio	51st
Newton W. Nutting	Republican	New York (27th district)	October 15, 1889	48	Cancer of the jaw	Oswego, New York	Riverside Cemetery, Oswego, New York	Sereno E. Payne	March 4, 1887 (previously served March 4, 1883 – March 3, 1885)	October 22, 1840	West Monroe, New York	51st
William D. Kelley	Republican	Pennsylvania (4th district)	January 9, 1890	75	"Intestinal catarrh"	Washington, D.C.	Laurel Hill Cemetery, Philadelphia, Pennsylvania	John E. Reyburn	March 4, 1861	April 12, 1814	Philadelphia, Pennsylvania	51st
David Wilber	Republican	New York (24th district)	April 1, 1890	69	Unknown	Oneonta, New York	Glenwood Cemetery, Oneonta, New York	George Van Horn	March 4, 1887 (previously served March 4, 1873 – March 3, 1875 and March 4, 1879 – March 3, 1881)	October 5, 1820	Duanesburg, New York	51st
Samuel J. Randall	Democratic	Pennsylvania (3rd district)	April 13, 1890	61	"internal cancer" after a long illness	Washington, D.C.	Laurel Hill Cemetery, Philadelphia, Pennsylvania	Richard Vaux	March 4, 1863	October 10, 1828	Philadelphia, Pennsylvania	51st
James B. Beck	Democratic	Kentucky (Senator)	May 3, 1890	68	Heart failure	Washington, D.C.	Lexington Cemetery, Lexington, Kentucky	John G. Carlisle	March 4, 1877 (U.S. House tenure March 4, 1867 – March 3, 1875)	February 13, 1822	Dumfriesshire, Scotland	51st
James P. Walker	Democratic	Missouri (14th district)	July 19, 1890	39	Apoplexy	Dexter, Missouri	Dexter Cemetery, Dexter, Missouri	Robert H. Whitelaw	March 4, 1887	March 14, 1851	Memphis, Tennessee	51st
Lewis Findlay Watson	Republican	Pennsylvania (27th district)	August 25, 1890	71	Heart disease	Washington, D.C.	Oakland Cemetery, Warren, Pennsylvania	Charles W. Stone	March 4, 1889 (previously served March 4, 1877 – March 3, 1879 and March 4, 1881 – March 3, 1883)	April 14, 1819	Crawford County, Pennsylvania	51st
James Phelan Jr.	Democratic	Tennessee (10th district)	January 30, 1891	34	Pulmonary consumption	Nassau, Bahamas	Elmwood Cemetery, Memphis, Tennessee	Josiah Patterson	March 4, 1887	December 7, 1856	Aberdeen, Mississippi	51st
Ephraim K. Wilson II	Democratic	Maryland (Senator)	February 24, 1891	69	"heart failure, following an attack of cholera morbus"	Washington, D.C.	Churchyard of Makemie Memorial Presbyterian Church, Snow Hill, Maryland	Charles H. Gibson	March 4, 1885 (U.S. House tenure March 4, 1873 – March 3, 1875)	December 22, 1821	Snow Hill, Maryland	51st
George Hearst	Democratic	California (Senator)	February 28, 1891	70	Bright's disease, heart trouble, and intestinal disorder	Washington, D.C.	Cypress Lawn Memorial Park, Colma, California	Charles N. Felton	March 4, 1887 (previously served March 23, 1886 – August 4, 1886)	September 3, 1820	Sullivan, Missouri	51st
Francis B. Spinola	Democratic	New York (10th district)	April 14, 1891	70	Pneumonia	Washington, D.C.	Green-Wood Cemetery, Brooklyn, New York	William Bourke Cockran	March 4, 1887	March 19, 1821	Old Field, New York	52nd
Melbourne H. Ford	Democratic	Michigan (5th district)	April 20, 1891	41	Apoplexy	Grand Rapids, Michigan	Oak Hill Cemetery, Grand Rapids, Michigan	Charles E. Belknap	March 4, 1891 (previously served March 4, 1887 – March 3, 1889)	June 30, 1849	Salem, Michigan	52nd
Leonidas C. Houk	Republican	Tennessee (2nd district)	May 25, 1891	54	Heart disease and accidental arsenic poisoning	Knoxville, Tennessee	Old Gray Cemetery, Knoxville, Tennessee	John C. Houk	March 4, 1879	June 8, 1836	Boyds Creek, Tennessee	52nd
John Rankin Gamble	Republican	South Dakota (at-large)	August 14, 1891	43	Paralysis	Yankton, South Dakota	Yankton City Cemetery, Yankton, South Dakota	John L. Jolley	March 4, 1891	January 15, 1848	Alabama, New York	52nd
William Henry Fitzhugh Lee	Democratic	Virginia (8th district)	October 15, 1891	54	Heart disease	Alexandria, Virginia	Lee Chapel, Lexington, Virginia	Elisha E. Meredith	March 4, 1887	May 31, 1837	Arlington, Virginia	52nd
Preston B. Plumb	Republican	Kansas (Senator)	December 20, 1891	54	Apoplexy	Washington, D.C.	Maple Wood Cemetery, Emporia, Kansas	Bishop W. Perkins	March 4, 1877	October 12, 1837	Delaware County, Ohio	52nd
John W. Kendall	Democratic	Kentucky (10th district)	March 7, 1892	57	Apoplexy	Washington, D.C.	Barber Cemetery, West Liberty, Kentucky	Joseph M. Kendall	March 4, 1891	June 26, 1834	Morgan County, Kentucky	52nd
John S. Barbour Jr.	Democratic	Virginia (Senator)	May 14, 1892	71	Heart failure	Washington, D.C.	Poplar Hill burial ground, Prince George's County, Maryland	Eppa Hunton	March 4, 1889 (U.S. House tenure March 4, 1881 – March 3, 1887)	December 29, 1820	Culpeper, Virginia	52nd
Eli T. Stackhouse	Democratic	South Carolina (6th district)	June 14, 1892	68	Heart disease	Washington, D.C.	Little Rock Cemetery, Little Rock, South Carolina	John L. McLaurin	March 4, 1891	March 27, 1824	Little Rock, South Carolina	52nd
Alexander K. Craig	Democratic	Pennsylvania (24th district)	July 29, 1892	64	Jaundice	Claysville, Pennsylvania	Claysville Cemetery, Claysville, Pennsylvania	William A. Sipe	February 26, 1892	February 21, 1828	Claysville, Pennsylvania	52nd
John G. Warwick	Democratic	Ohio (16th district)	August 14, 1892	61	Dysentery	New York City, New York	Protestant Cemetery, Massillon, Ohio	Lewis P. Ohliger	March 4, 1891	December 23, 1830	County Tyrone, Ireland	52nd
Edward F. McDonald	Democratic	New Jersey (7th district)	November 5, 1892	48	Pneumonia	Harrison, New Jersey	Holy Sepulchre Cemetery, East Orange, New Jersey	George B. Fielder	March 4, 1891	September 21, 1844	Ireland	52nd
Randall L. Gibson	Democratic	Louisiana (Senator)	December 15, 1892	60	Heart disease	Hot Springs, Arkansas	Lexington Cemetery, Lexington, Kentucky	Donelson Caffery	March 4, 1883 (U.S. House tenure March 4, 1875 – March 3, 1883)	September 10, 1832	Versailles, Kentucky	52nd
John E. Kenna	Democratic	West Virginia (Senator)	January 11, 1893	44	Heart disease	Washington, D.C.	U.S.	Johnson N. Camden	March 4, 1883 (U.S. House tenure March 4, 1877 – March 3, 1883)	April 10, 1848	St. Albans, West Virginia	52nd
Leland Stanford	Republican	California (Senator)	June 21, 1893	69	Heart attack	Palo Alto, California	Stanford Mausoleum, Stanford, California	George C. Perkins	March 4, 1885	March 9, 1824	Watervliet, New York	53rd
William Mutchler	Democratic	Pennsylvania (8th district)	June 23, 1893	61	Heart disease	Easton, Pennsylvania	Easton Cemetery, Easton, Pennsylvania	Howard Mutchler	March 4, 1889 (previously served March 4, 1875 – March 3, 1877 and March 4, 1881 – March 3, 1885)	December 21, 1831	Palmer Township, Pennsylvania	53rd
William H. Enochs	Republican	Ohio (10th district)	July 13, 1893	51	"attack of grip, which had affected his heart"	Ironton, Ohio	Arlington National Cemetery, Arlington, Virginia	Hezekiah S. Bundy	March 4, 1891	March 29, 1842	Middleburg, Ohio	53rd
John L. Chipman	Democratic	Michigan (1st district)	August 17, 1893	63	Pneumonia	Detroit, Michigan	Elmwood Cemetery, Detroit, Michigan	Levi T. Griffin	March 4, 1887	June 5, 1830	Detroit, Michigan	53rd
Charles O'Neill	Republican	Pennsylvania (2nd district)	November 25, 1893	72	Consumption	Philadelphia, Pennsylvania	West Laurel Hill Cemetery, Bala Cynwyd, Pennsylvania	Robert Adams Jr.	March 4, 1873 (previously served March 4, 1863 – March 3, 1871)	March 21, 1821	Philadelphia, Pennsylvania	53rd
William Lilly	Republican	Pennsylvania (at-large)	December 1, 1893	72	"congestion of the lungs"	Mauch Chunk, Pennsylvania	City Cemetery, Jim Thorpe, Pennsylvania	Alexander McDowell	March 4, 1893	June 3, 1821	Penn Yan, New York	53rd
George W. Houk	Democratic	Ohio (3rd district)	February 9, 1894	68	Heart failure	Washington, D.C.	Woodland Cemetery, Dayton, Ohio	Paul J. Sorg	March 4, 1891	September 25, 1825	Mount Holly Springs, Pennsylvania	53rd
Alfred H. Colquitt	Democratic	Georgia (Senator)	March 26, 1894	69	Paralysis	Washington, D.C.	Rose Hill Cemetery, Macon, Georgia	Patrick Walsh	March 4, 1883 (U.S. House tenure March 4, 1853 – March 3, 1855)	April 20, 1824	Monroe, Georgia	53rd
Zebulon B. Vance	Democratic	North Carolina (Senator)	April 14, 1894	63	Apoplexy	Washington, D.C.	Riverside Cemetery, Asheville, North Carolina	Thomas J. Jarvis	March 4, 1879 (U.S. House tenure December 7, 1858 – March 3, 1861)	May 13, 1830	Weaverville, North Carolina	53rd
Francis B. Stockbridge	Republican	Michigan (Senator)	April 30, 1894	68	"stomach and heart trouble"	Chicago, Illinois	Mountain Home Cemetery, Kalamazoo, Michigan	John Patton Jr.	March 4, 1887	April 9, 1826	Bath, Maine	53rd
Robert F. Brattan	Democratic	Maryland (1st district)	May 10, 1894	48	"complication of heart and kidney troubles"	Princess Anne, Maryland	St. Andrew's Cemetery, Princess Anne, Maryland	Winder Laird Henry	March 4, 1893	May 13, 1845	Somerset (now Wicomico) County, Maryland	53rd
Marcus C. Lisle	Democratic	Kentucky (10th district)	July 7, 1894	31	"complication of consumption and Bright's disease"	Winchester, Kentucky	Winchester Cemetery, Winchester, Kentucky	William M. Beckner	March 4, 1893	September 23, 1862	Winchester, Kentucky	53rd
George B. Shaw	Republican	Wisconsin (7th district)	August 27, 1894	40	Malaria	Eau Claire, Wisconsin	Lake View Cemetery, Eau Claire, Wisconsin	Michael Griffin	March 4, 1893	March 12, 1854	Alma, New York	53rd
Myron B. Wright	Republican	Pennsylvania (15th district)	November 13, 1894	47	Typhoid fever	Trenton, Ontario, Canada	Grand Street Cemetery, Susquehanna, Pennsylvania	Edwin J. Jorden	March 4, 1889	June 12, 1847	Forest Lake, Pennsylvania	53rd
Philip S. Post	Republican	Illinois (10th district)	January 6, 1895	61	"heart failure, resulting from acute gastritis"	Washington, D.C.	Hope Cemetery, Galesburg, Illinois	George W. Prince	March 4, 1887	March 19, 1833	Florida, New York	53rd
William Cogswell	Republican	Massachusetts (6th district)	May 22, 1895	56	"kidney trouble"	Washington, D.C.	Harmony Grove Cemetery, Salem, Massachusetts	William H. Moody	March 4, 1887	August 23, 1838	Bradford, Massachusetts	54th
Frederick Remann	Republican	Illinois (18th district)	July 14, 1895	48	"nervous prostration"	Vandalia, Illinois	South Hill Cemetery, Vandalia, Illinois	William F. L. Hadley	March 4, 1895	May 10, 1847	Vandalia, Illinois	54th
William H. Crain	Democratic	Texas (11th district)	February 10, 1896	47	"catarrhal pneumonia"	Washington, D.C.	Hillside Cemetery, Cuero, Texas	Rudolph Kleberg	March 4, 1885	November 25, 1848	Galveston, Texas	54th
Charles F. Crisp	Democratic	Georgia (3rd district)	October 23, 1896	51	Heart paroxysm, preceded by malaria	Atlanta, Georgia	Oak Grove Cemetery, Americus, Georgia	Charles R. Crisp	March 4, 1883	January 29, 1845	Sheffield, England	54th
Seth L. Milliken	Republican	Maine (3rd district)	April 18, 1897	65	Pneumonia, along with liver and kidney complications	Washington, D.C.	Grove Cemetery, Belfast, Maine	Edwin C. Burleigh	March 4, 1883	December 12, 1831	Montville, Maine	55th
William S. Holman	Republican	Indiana (4th district)	April 22, 1897	74	Spinal meningitis	Washington, D.C.	River View Cemetery, Aurora, Indiana	Francis M. Griffith	March 4, 1897 (previously served March 4, 1859 – March 3, 1865, March 4, 1867 – March 3, 1877 and March 4, 1881 – March 3, 1895)	September 6, 1822	Dearborn County, Indiana	55th
Joseph H. Earle	Democratic	South Carolina (Senator)	May 20, 1897	50	Bright's disease	Greenville, South Carolina	Christ Churchyard, Greenville, South Carolina	John L. McLaurin	March 4, 1897	April 30, 1847	Greenville, South Carolina	55th
Edward D. Cooke	Republican	Illinois (6th district)	June 24, 1897	47	Heart disease	Washington, D.C.	Rosehill Cemetery, Chicago, Illinois	Henry S. Boutell	March 4, 1895	October 17, 1849	Cascade, Iowa	55th
Isham G. Harris	Democratic	Tennessee (Senator)	July 8, 1897	79	Following an attack of the grip	Washington, D.C.	Elmwood Cemetery, Memphis, Tennessee	Thomas B. Turley	March 4, 1877 (U.S. House tenure March 4, 1849 – March 3, 1853)	February 10, 1818	Franklin County, Tennessee	55th
James Z. George	Democratic	Mississippi (Senator)	August 14, 1897	70	Heart ailment	Mississippi City, Mississippi	Evergreen Cemetery, North Carrollton, Mississippi	Hernando Money	March 4, 1881	October 20, 1826	Monroe County, Georgia	55th
Ashley B. Wright	Republican	Massachusetts (1st district)	August 14, 1897	56	Apoplexy	North Adams, Massachusetts	Hinsdale Cemetery, Hinsdale, Massachusetts	George P. Lawrence	March 4, 1893	May 25, 1841	Hinsdale, Massachusetts	55th
John Simpkins	Republican	Massachusetts (13th district)	March 27, 1898	35	"heart failure, induced by gastric complications"	Washington, D.C.	Woodside Cemetery, Yarmouth, Massachusetts	William S. Greene	March 4, 1895	June 27, 1862	New Bedford, Massachusetts	55th
Edward C. Walthall	Democratic	Mississippi (Senator)	April 21, 1898	67	Typhoid pneumonia	Washington, D.C.	Hillcrest Cemetery, Holly Springs, Mississippi	William V. Sullivan	March 4, 1895 (previously served March 9, 1885 – January 24, 1894)	April 4, 1831	Richmond, Virginia	55th
Stephen A. Northway	Republican	Ohio (19th district)	September 8, 1898	65	Bright's disease	Jefferson, Ohio	Oakdale Cemetery, Jefferson, Ohio	Charles W. F. Dick	March 4, 1893	June 19, 1833	Christian Hollow, New York	55th
William F. Love	Democratic	Mississippi (6th district)	October 16, 1898	48	"attack of slow fever"	Gloster, Mississippi	Gloster Cemetery, Gloster, Mississippi	Frank A. McLain	March 4, 1897	March 29, 1850	Liberty, Mississippi	55th
Justin Smith Morrill	Republican	Vermont (Senator)	December 28, 1898	88	Pneumonia, following the grip	Washington, D.C.	Strafford Cemetery, Strafford, Vermont	Jonathan Ross	March 4, 1867 (U.S. House tenure March 4, 1855 – March 3, 1867)	April 14, 1810	Strafford, Vermont	55th
Nelson Dingley Jr.	Republican	Maine (2nd district)	January 13, 1899	66	Heart failure, following pneumonia	Washington, D.C.	Oak Hill Cemetery, Auburn, Maine	Charles E. Littlefield	September 13, 1881	February 15, 1832	Durham, Maine	55th
Denis M. Hurley	Republican	New York (2nd district)	February 26, 1899	55	"Bright's disease and gout"	Hot Springs, Virginia	Holy Cross Roman Catholic Cemetery, Brooklyn, New York	John J. Fitzgerald	March 4, 1895	March 14, 1843	Limerick, Rhode Island	55th
John W. Cranford	Democratic	Texas (4th district)	March 3, 1899	36/37	Heart disease	Washington, D.C.	City Cemetery, Sulphur Springs, Texas	John L. Sheppard	March 4, 1897	Sometime in 1862	Grove Hill, Alabama	55th
William L. Greene	People's	Nebraska (6th district)	March 11, 1899	49	Heart disease	Omaha, Nebraska	Kearney Cemetery, Kearney, Nebraska	William Neville	March 4, 1897	October 3, 1849	Pike County, Indiana	56th
Samuel T. Baird	Democratic	Louisiana (5th district)	April 22, 1899	37	Endocarditis	Washington, D.C.	Christ Church Cemetery, Bastrop, Louisiana	Joseph E. Ransdell	March 4, 1897	May 5, 1861	Oak Ridge, Louisiana	56th
Richard P. Bland	Democratic	Missouri (8th district)	June 15, 1899	63	Cerebral congestion, nervous prostration, and catarrh, following the grippe	Lebanon, Missouri	Calvary Catholic Cemetery, Lebanon, Missouri	Dorsey W. Shackleford	March 4, 1897 (previously served March 4, 1873 – March 3, 1895)	August 19, 1835	Hartford, Kentucky	56th
Lorenzo Danford	Republican	Ohio (16th district)	June 19, 1899	69	Heart disease	St. Clairsville, Ohio	Friends Cemetery, St. Clairsville, Ohio	Joseph J. Gill	March 4, 1895 (previously served March 4, 1873 – March 3, 1879)	October 18, 1829	Belmont County, Ohio	56th
Daniel Ermentrout	Democratic	Pennsylvania (9th district)	September 17, 1899	62	Paralysis, following a choking incident	Reading, Pennsylvania	Charles Evans Cemetery, Reading, Pennsylvania	Henry Dickinson Green	March 4, 1897 (previously served March 4, 1881 – March 3, 1889)	January 24, 1837	Reading, Pennsylvania	56th
Evan E. Settle	Democratic	Kentucky (7th district)	November 16, 1899	50	Heart disease	Owenton, Kentucky	Odd Fellows Cemetery, Owenton, Kentucky	June Ward Gayle	March 4, 1897	December 1, 1848	Frankfort, Kentucky	56th
Monroe Hayward	Republican	Nebraska (Senator)	December 5, 1899	58	Paralysis	Nebraska City, Nebraska	Wyuka Cemetery, Nebraska City, Nebraska	William V. Allen	March 8, 1899	December 22, 1840	Willsboro, New York	56th

== See also ==
- List of members of the United States Congress who died in office (1900–1949)
- List of members of the United States Congress who died in office (1950–1999)
- List of members of the United States Congress who died in office (2000–present)
