= Tilden Township, Cherokee County, Iowa =

Township in Iowa, US

Tilden Township
- Township
- Coordinates: 42°41′28″N 095°48′16″W
- Country: United States
- State: Iowa
- County: Cherokee

Area
  - Total: 36.25 sq mi (93.88 km^{2})
  - Land: 36.25 sq mi (93.88 km^{2})
  - Water: 0 sq mi (0 km^{2})
- Elevation: 1,296 ft (395 m)

Population (2000)
  - Total: 194
  - Density: 5.4/sq mi (2.1/km^{2})
- FIPS code: 19-94113
- GNIS feature ID: 0468789

Tilden Township is one of sixteen townships in Cherokee County, Iowa, United States. As of the 2000 census, its population was 194.

== History ==
Tilden Township was named after Joseph White Tilden (1819–1903) a pioneer who emigrated first from Lebanon, Connecticut, to Forest Lake, Pennsylvania, to Springfield, Illinois, and then to Winneshiek County, Iowa. In 1866, he claimed as a homestead 480 acres (1.9 km^{2}) of section 26, residing there with his wife, Irene Elizabeth West, and five children. They moved to the Washington Territory in 1885.

== Geography ==
Tilden Township covers an area of 36.25 square miles (93.9 km^{2}) and contains no incorporated settlements. According to the USGS, it contains two cemeteries: Mount Pleasant and Trinity.
