= Davis Dimock Jr. =

American politician

Member of the U.S. House of Representatives from Pennsylvania's 17th district
- In office March 4, 1841 – January 13, 1842
- Preceded by: Samuel Wells Morris
- Succeeded by: Almon Heath Read

Personal details
- Born: September 17, 1801 Exeter, Pennsylvania
- Died: January 13, 1842 (aged 40) Montrose, Pennsylvania
- Party: Democratic

Davis Dimock Jr. (September 17, 1801 – January 13, 1842) served briefly as a Democratic member of the U.S. House of Representatives from Pennsylvania from 1841 to 1842.

== Biography ==
Davis Dimock Jr. was born in Exeter, Pennsylvania (near Wilkes-Barre, Pennsylvania). He attended the schools of the pioneer settlement of Montrose, Pennsylvania, and the Susquehanna County Academy at Montrose. He studied law, was admitted to the bar in 1833 and commenced practice in Montrose, and was also engaged in editorial work.

=== Political career ===
He was appointed Susquehanna County treasurer in 1834.

Dimock was elected as a Democrat to the Twenty-seventh Congress and served until his death in Montrose in 1842.

Interment is in Montrose Cemetery. Cenotaph at Congressional Cemetery in Washington, D.C.

== See also ==
- List of members of the United States Congress who died in office (1790–1899)

U.S. House of Representatives
Preceded by Samuel Wells Morris	Member of the U.S. House of Representatives from Pennsylvania's 17th congressional district 1841–1842	Succeeded by Almon H. Read
