= Samuel Caruthers =

American politician

Member of the U.S. House of Representatives from Missouri's 7th district
- In office March 3, 1853 – March 4, 1859
- Preceded by: District established
- Succeeded by: John William Noell

Personal details
- Born: October 13, 1820 Madison County, Missouri
- Died: July 20, 1860 (aged 39) Cape Girardeau, Missouri, U.S.
- Party: Whig (before 1857); Democratic (after 1857)
- Occupation: Lawyer and politician

Samuel Caruthers (October 13, 1820 – July 20, 1860) was a U.S. representative from Missouri.

Born in Madison County, Missouri, Caruthers graduated from Cumberland University, Lebanon, Tennessee. He studied law. He was admitted to the bar and commenced practice in Fredericktown, Missouri. He moved to Cape Girardeau, Missouri, in 1844. Congressman Caruthers held several local offices prior to being elected to the U.S. Congress.

Caruthers was elected as a Whig to the Thirty-third Congress. He was reelected as a Whig candidate to the Thirty-fourth Congresses (March 4, 1855 – March 3, 1857). Caruthers changed political party membership again and was reelected as a Democrat to the Thirty-fifth Congress (March 4, 1857 – March 3, 1859). He died in Cape Girardeau, Missouri, July 20, 1860.

Caruthersville, Missouri, was named in his honor.

== Notes ==
U.S. House of Representatives
Preceded by District created	Member of the U.S. House of Representatives from Missouri's 7th congressional district 1853–1859	Succeeded by John William Noell
