= Thomas E. Noell =

American lawyer, politician and military officer (1839–1867)

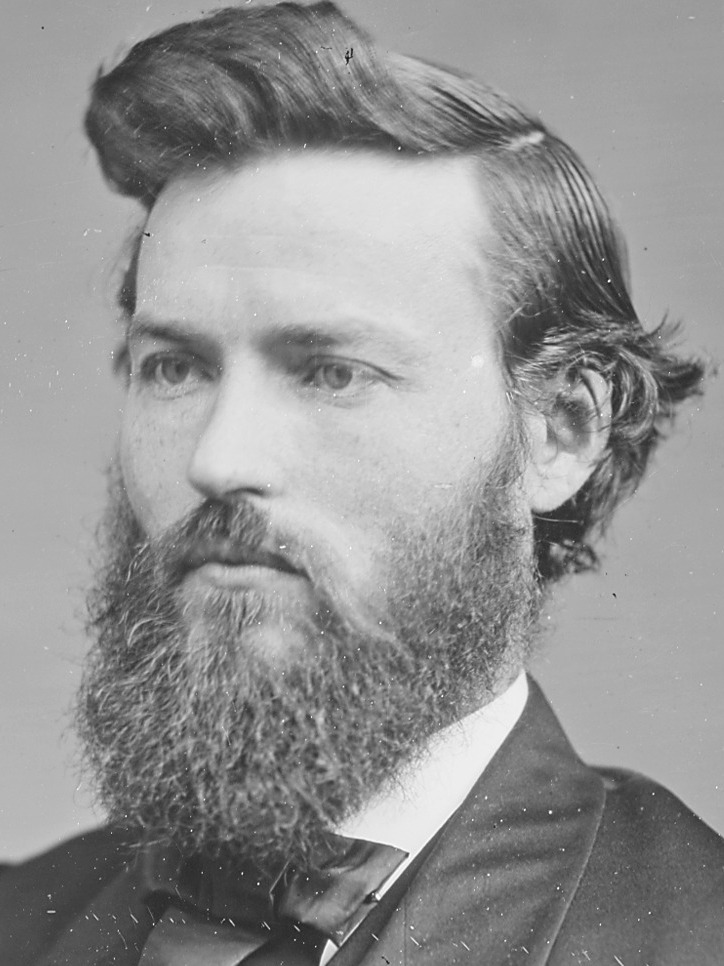
- Portrait of Noell by Mathew Brady, c. 1860–1865

Member of the U.S. House of Representatives from Missouri's 3rd district
- In office March 4, 1865 – October 3, 1867
- Preceded by: John Guier Scott
- Succeeded by: James Robinson McCormick

Personal details
- Born: Thomas Estes Noell; April 3, 1839 Perryville, Missouri, US
- Died: October 3, 1867 (aged 28) St. Louis, Missouri, US
- Party: Democratic, Republican
- Relations: John William Noell (father)
- Occupation: Politician, lawyer

Thomas Estes Noell (April 3, 1839 – October 3, 1867) was an American lawyer, politician, and military officer. He was a member of the United States House of Representatives from Missouri.

== Biography ==
Noell was born on April 3, 1839, in Perryville, Missouri, a son of politician John W. Noell. Educated at the seminary of St. Mary's of the Barrens Catholic Church, he later studied law under his father, and was admitted to the bar in 1858, after which he began practice in Perryville. He moved to Dubuque, Iowa for better opportunities, though returned to Missouri after contracting bronchitis due to Iowa's climate.

Noell served as a military commissioner in 1861, at the outbreak of the American Civil War. From July 1861 to April 1862, he was a major in the Missouri State Militia. On April 1, 1862, he was appointed an unassigned captain in Company C of the 19th Indiana Infantry Regiment. He resigned on February 20, 1865, to be seated in the United States House of Representatives.

In Congress, Noell represented the Missouri's 3rd district. He was elected for two terms, serving from March 4, 1865, to October 3, 1867. He was a Republican during his first term then a Democrat during his second. The St. Louis Democrat described him as politically inexperienced and unable to satisfy the wants of his constituents, particularly those who were more radical.

Noell was Christian. He died in office, on October 3, 1867, aged 28, in St. Louis, from bowel inflammation. He was buried at St. Mary's Cemetery, in Perryville. A cenotaph dedicated to him is present at the Congressional Cemetery.

== See also ==
- List of members of the United States Congress who died in office (1790–1899)

U.S. House of Representatives
Preceded by John Guier Scott	Member of the U.S. House of Representatives from Missouri's 3rd congressional district 1865–1867	Succeeded by James Robinson McCormick
