= Congestion of the brain =

Obsolete medical term

"Congestion of the brain" and "cerebral congestion" were medical terms used before hypertension was understood. The term was first proposed by Samuel Siegfried Karl von Basch in the nineteenth century and was widely used for the next 150 years, and had a major influence on the treatment of stroke. It was used for what are now known to be cerebral haemorrhage, lacunes, état criblé (widened perivascular spaces throughout the basal ganglia, particularly in the corpus striatum), depression, manic outbursts, headaches, coma, and seizures. It was said to be "more common... than any other affliction of the nervous system". The concept fell out of use with advances in medicine.
