= Almon Heath Read =

American politician

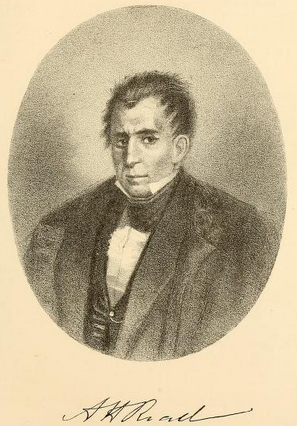
- Congressman Almon H. Read

Member of the U.S. House of Representatives from Pennsylvania
- In office March 18, 1842 – June 3, 1844
- Preceded by: David Dimock, Jr. (17th); James Cooper (12th)
- Succeeded by: James Irvin (17th); George Fuller (12th)
- Constituency: 17th district (1842-43); 12th district (1843-44)

Member of the Pennsylvania Senate from the 11th district
- In office 1833–1837
- Preceded by: Reuben Wilber
- Succeeded by: Luther Kidder

Member of the Pennsylvania House of Representatives
- In office 1827–1832

14th Treasurer of Pennsylvania
- In office 1840–1841

Personal details
- Born: June 12, 1790 Shelburne, Vermont
- Died: June 3, 1844 (aged 53) Montrose, Pennsylvania, US
- Party: Democratic
- Education: Williams College

Almon Heath Read (June 12, 1790 – June 3, 1844) was an American politician who served as a Democratic member of the U.S. House of Representatives for Pennsylvania's 17th congressional district from 1842 to 1843 and Pennsylvania's 12th congressional district from 1843 to 1844. He served in both houses of the Pennsylvania legislature and as Pennsylvania State Treasurer.

== Early life and education ==
Read was born in Shelburne, Vermont. He graduated from Williams College in Williamstown, Massachusetts in 1811. He served as county clerk from 1815 to 1820. He studied law, was admitted to the bar in 1816 and commenced practice in Montrose, Pennsylvania.

== Career ==
He was a member of the Pennsylvania House of Representatives from 1827 to 1832. He served in the Pennsylvania State Senate for the 11th district from 1833 to 1837 and as Pennsylvania State Treasurer from 1840 to 1841.

Read was elected as a Democrat to the Twenty-seventh Congress to fill the vacancy caused by the death of Davis Dimock, Jr. He was reelected to the Twenty-eighth Congress and served until his death in Montrose in 1844. Interment in Montrose Cemetery.

== See also ==
- List of members of the United States Congress who died in office (1790–1899)

== Sources ==
- United States Congress. "Almon Heath Read (id: R000090)". Biographical Directory of the United States Congress.
- The Political Graveyard

Pennsylvania House of Representatives
Preceded by	Member of the Pennsylvania House of Representatives; 1827-1832	Succeeded by
Pennsylvania State Senate
Preceded by Reuben Wilber	Member of the Pennsylvania Senate, 11th district 1833-1837	Succeeded by Luther Kidder
U.S. House of Representatives
Preceded by Davis Dimock, Jr.	Member of the U.S. House of Representatives from Pennsylvania's 17th congressional district 1842–1843	Succeeded by James Irvin
Preceded by James Cooper	Member of the U.S. House of Representatives from Pennsylvania's 12th congressional district 1843–1844	Succeeded by George Fuller
