= John W. Noell =

American politician (1816–1863)

John William Noell

Member of the U.S. House of Representatives from Missouri
- In office March 4, 1859 – March 14, 1863
- Preceded by: Samuel Caruthers (7th); William A. Hall (3rd)
- Succeeded by: Benjamin F. Loan (7th); John G. Scott (3rd)
- Constituency: 7th district (1859-63); 3rd district (1863)

Member of the Missouri Senate
- In office 1851–1855

Clerk of the Circuit Court of Perry County, Missouri
- In office 1841–1850

Personal details
- Born: February 22, 1816 Bedford, Virginia, U.S.
- Died: March 14, 1863 (aged 47) Washington, D.C., U.S.
- Resting place: St. Mary's Cemetery Perryville, Missouri; cenotaph at Congressional Cemetery, Washington, D.C.
- Party: Democratic (before 1862); Emancipation (1862–63)
- Spouse: Marie Ann Gregoire (m. 1836)
- Children: 9 (including Thomas E. Noell)
- Parents: John D Noell (father); Sarah Ann Estes (mother)
- Occupation: Attorney at law; US Congressman; State Senator

John William Noell (February 22, 1816 – March 14, 1863) was an American politician who represented Missouri in the United States House of Representatives from 1858 to 1863.

Noell was born and educated in Bedford County, Virginia. In 1833, he relocated to Perryville, Missouri, where he worked as a miller and storekeeper. He was admitted to the bar in 1843 and practiced law and Perryville. Concurrently, he became active in Missouri politics, serving as clerk of the circuit court of Perry County from 1841 to 1850 and as a member of the Missouri Senate from 1851 to 1858.

Noell was elected as a Democrat to the United States House of Representatives in 1858 and re-elected in 1860, representing Missouri's 7th congressional district. He remained loyal to the national government during the American Civil War and won reelection to a third and final term in the House in 1862 as an Emancipationist, having been redistricted to the 3rd congressional district in the interim. A Unionist, Noell proposed a plan for compensated emancipation in December 1862, wherein the United States government would pay loyal slaveholders a combined sum of $10 million over a period of 30 years; as a further condition, he proposed that freed people be colonized outside the United States. Noell was one of two slave state members to serve on a select committee of the House that produced the Confiscation Act of 1862. In an address to the House on December 17, 1862, he impugned his former colleagues in the Democratic Party for their reluctance to support the aggressive prosecution of the war. He denounced proposals for a negotiated peace and ridiculed the belief that slavery and the Union could both be preserved, stating, "when slavery comes in as an element of rebel strength, and the question is presented between its perpetuation and the preservation of the Union, then let the former die." He died on March 14, 1863, ten days into his third term.

== See also ==
- List of members of the United States Congress who died in office (1790–1899)

U.S. House of Representatives
Preceded by Samuel Caruthers	Member of the U.S. House of Representatives from Missouri's 7th congressional district 1859–1863	Succeeded by Benjamin F. Loan
Preceded by William Augustus Hall	Member of the U.S. House of Representatives from Missouri's 3rd congressional district 1863	Succeeded by John Guier Scott
