= James R. McCormick =

American politician

James Robinson McCormick

Member of the U.S. House of Representatives from Missouri's 3rd district
- In office December 17, 1867 – March 3, 1873
- Preceded by: Thomas E. Noell
- Succeeded by: William Henry Stone

Personal details
- Born: August 1, 1824 Irondale, Missouri
- Died: May 19, 1897 (aged 72) Farmington, Missouri,
- Party: Democratic

James Robinson McCormick (August 1, 1824 – May 19, 1897) was a United States representative from Missouri.

Born near Irondale, Washington County, Missouri, McCormick attended public schools in Washington County, Missouri. He received private instruction and entered Transylvania University, Lexington, Kentucky, as a medical student. He graduated from the Memphis (Tennessee) Medical College in 1849 and commenced practice in Wayne County, Missouri. He moved to Perry County in 1850 and continued the practice of medicine.

He served as a delegate to the state constitutional convention in 1861. During the Civil War he served as a surgeon in the Sixth Regiment, Missouri Volunteer Infantry, Union Army. He served in the Missouri State Senate in 1862, but resigned on account of duties in the Army. He became a brigadier general of militia in 1863. After the war he located in Arcadia, Missouri, and resumed the practice of medicine. He again served in the state senate in 1866, but resigned the following year.

McCormick was elected as a Democratic Representative for Missouri's 3rd congressional district to the Fortieth Congress to fill the vacancy caused by the death of Thomas E. Noell. He was reelected to the Forty-first and Forty-second Congresses and served from December 17, 1867, to March 3, 1873. He was not a candidate for reelection in 1872.

He moved to Farmington, Missouri, in 1874 where he practiced medicine and engaged in the pharmaceutical business. He died in Farmington, St. Francois County, Missouri, May 19, 1897. He was interred in Masonic Cemetery.

U.S. House of Representatives
Preceded by Thomas E. Noell	Member of the U.S. House of Representatives from Missouri's 3rd congressional district 1867-1873	Succeeded by William Henry Stone
