= George Fuller (American politician) =

American politician

Member of the U.S. House of Representatives from Pennsylvania's 12th district
- In office December 2, 1844 – March 3, 1845
- Preceded by: Almon Heath Read
- Succeeded by: David Wilmot

Personal details
- Born: November 7, 1802 Norwich, Connecticut, U.S.
- Died: November 24, 1888 (aged 86) Scranton, Pennsylvania, U.S.
- Party: Democratic

George Fuller (November 7, 1802 – November 24, 1888) was an American newspaperman and politician who served briefly as a Democratic member of the U.S. House of Representatives from Pennsylvania from 1844 to 1845.

== Biography ==
George Fuller was born in Norwich, Connecticut. He moved to Montrose, Pennsylvania and engaged in mercantile pursuits.

Fuller was elected as a Democrat to the Twenty-eighth Congress to fill the vacancy caused by the death of Almon H. Read.

He was editor of the Montrose Democrat, the Montrose Gazette, and the Susquehanna Register.

He served as treasurer of Susquehanna County, Pennsylvania. He was a member of the Republican Party during the last 25 years of his life. He died in Scranton, Pennsylvania in 1888 and was buried in Montrose.

== Sources ==
- United States Congress. "George Fuller (id: F000409)". Biographical Directory of the United States Congress.
- The Political Graveyard

U.S. House of Representatives
Preceded by Almon H. Read	Member of the U.S. House of Representatives from Pennsylvania's 12th congressional district 1844–1845	Succeeded by David Wilmot
