= Status cribrosum =

Widening of perivascular spaces of the brain

Status cribrosus
- Other names: État criblé; cribriform state; "Swiss cheese striatum"
- Specialty: Neurology; neuroradiology; neuropathology
- Symptoms: Often none (incidental imaging finding)
- Frequency: Reported in 1.3% of participants in one population-based cohort of elderly adults

Status cribrosum (French: état criblé) is a term used in neuropathology and neuroimaging for diffuse widening of perivascular (Virchow–Robin) spaces, most often in the basal ganglia, producing a "sieve-like" (cribriform) appearance of the affected brain tissue.

== Appearance ==
In the brain, perivascular spaces are fluid-filled compartments that accompany small penetrating vessels as they course from the subarachnoid space into the brain parenchyma. Dilated perivascular spaces most often occur in characteristic locations (for example, along the lenticulostriate arteries in the basal ganglia) and have signal characteristics identical to cerebrospinal fluid on routine MRI sequences. When perivascular spaces are numerous and markedly enlarged in the basal ganglia, the resulting cribriform appearance is termed status cribrosum (état criblé).

Status cribrosum is most often recognized on MRI. They are often seen along lenticulostriate vessels bilaterally and symmetrically, showing CSF-like signal without restricted diffusion.

== Epidemiology ==
MRI-visible perivascular spaces are common in older adults. Status cribrosum represents an extreme pattern. In the population-based 3C-Dijon study of 1,826 elderly participants, status cribrosum was reported in 1.3% of participants.

== Clinical significance ==
Status cribrosum is frequently an incidental imaging finding and its direct clinical correlates remain uncertain. When the cribriform appearance is especially prominent in the striatum on MRI, it has been called "Swiss cheese striatum". Swiss cheese striatum was not found to be associated with parkinsonism or dementia, although the imaging pattern correlated with the degree of leukoaraiosis (white matter changes) on MRI.

== History ==
The French physician Durand-Fardel described a sieve-like appearance of brain tissue (état criblé) in the mid-19th century, a description now considered an early account of enlarged perivascular spaces in neuropathology.
