= John G. Scott =

American businessman and politician (1819–1892)

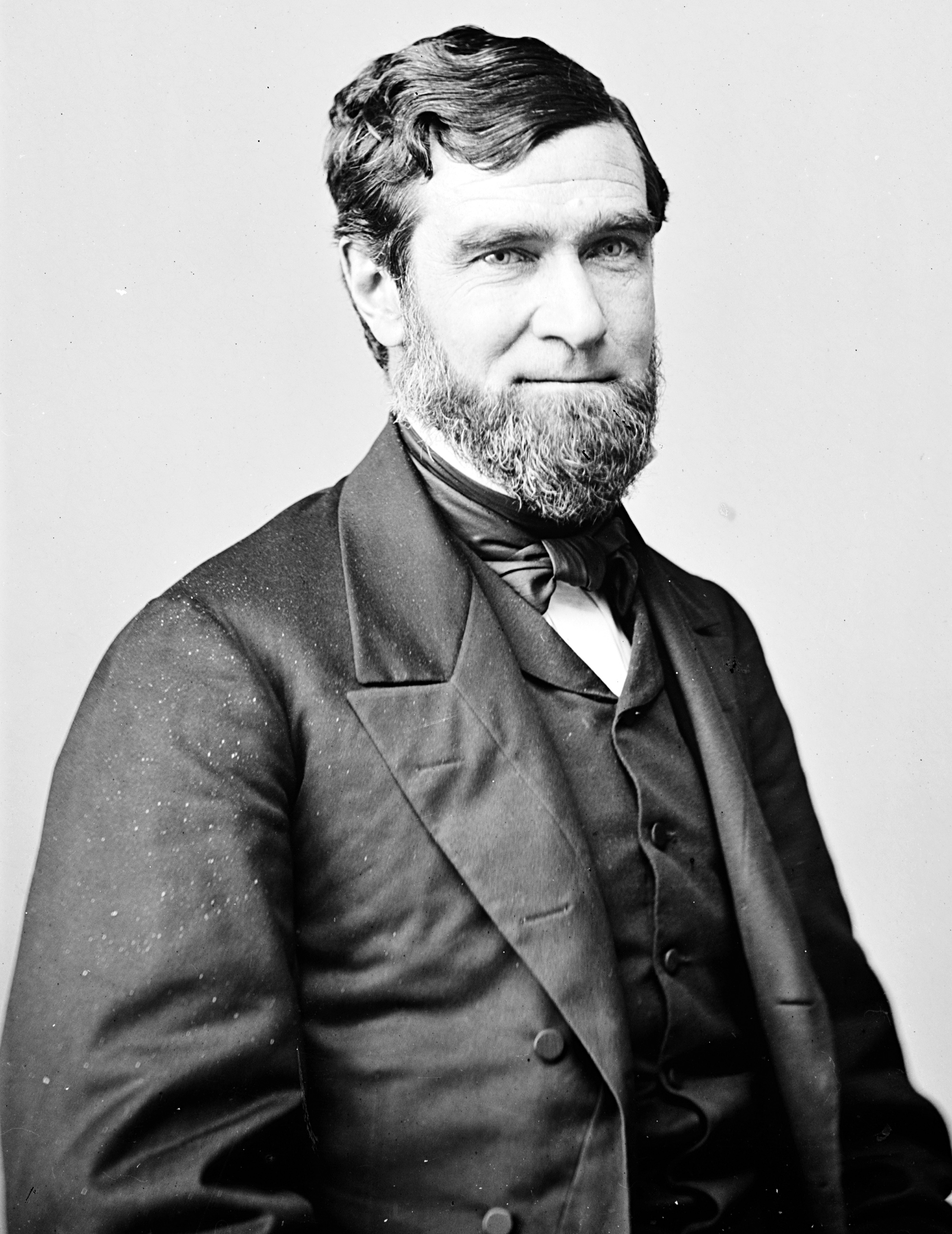
- Portrait of Scott by Mathew Brady, between 1855 and 1865

Member of the U.S. House of Representatives from Missouri's 3rd district
- In office December 7, 1863 – March 3, 1865
- Preceded by: John W. Noell
- Succeeded by: Thomas E. Noell

Personal details
- Born: John Guier Scott; December 26, 1819 Philadelphia, Pennsylvania, US
- Died: May 16, 1892 (aged 72) Oliver Springs, Tennessee, US
- Party: Democratic
- Occupation: Businessman, politician

John Guier Scott (December 26, 1819 – May 16, 1892) was an American businessman and politician. A Democrat, was a member of the United States House of Representatives from Missouri.

== Biography ==
Scott was born on December 26, 1819, in Philadelphia. Educated at preparatory schools, he studied civil engineering at Bethlehem Academy, graduating in 1842. He was the general manager of the Iron Mountain Company, and in 1858, founded the Irondale Iron Company. Edward King credited Scott as a major developer of Iron Mountain and of iron industry in Southeast Missouri.

A Democrat, Scott was an unsuccessful candidate in the 1862–63 United States House of Representatives elections. He was elected to Missouri's 3rd district, serving from December 7, 1863, to March 3, 1865, being elected to complete the unexpired term of John W. Noell following his death. In November 1863, politician James Lindsay claimed that Scott had moved to Kentucky to avoid participating in depositions. During his tenure, he was criticized for being politically inconsistent.

After serving in Congress, Scott moved to St. Louis, where he worked as a pharmacist and mining executive. In 1868, he began building furnaces, such as the Scotia Iron Furnace Stack, in Scotia, Missouri, which was the fifth furnace he built in the state. In 1869, he began building furnaces in Nova Scotia. He returned to St. Louis in 1870, moving to Tennessee c. 1880. He had a son. He died on May 16, 1892, aged 72, in Oliver Springs. He was buried at Bellefontaine Cemetery, in St. Louis.

U.S. House of Representatives
Preceded by John William Noell	Member of the U.S. House of Representatives from Missouri's 3rd congressional district 1863–1865	Succeeded by Thomas E. Noell
