= Forest Lake, Pennsylvania =

- Unincorporated community Census designated place
- Location of Susquehanna County in Pennsylvania

- Location within Pennsylvania Location within the United States
- Coordinates: 41°52′58.8″N 75°57′28.8″W
- Country: United States
- State: Pennsylvania
- County: Susquehanna
- Township: Forest Lake
- Elevation: 1,585 ft (483 m)

Population
  - Estimate (2023): 43
- Time zone: UTC-5 (Eastern (EST))
  - Summer (DST): UTC-4 (EDT)
- GNIS feature ID: 2830791

Forest Lake, Pennsylvania is an unincorporated community and census designated place (CDP) in Forest Lake Township, Susquehanna County, in the U.S. state of Pennsylvania.

== Demographics ==
Historical population
| Census | Pop. | Note | %± |
|---|---|---|---|
| 2023 (est.) | 43 |

The United States Census Bureau defined Forest Lake as a census designated place in 2023.
