= List of United States representatives in the 28th Congress =

This is a complete list of United States representatives during the 28th United States Congress listed by seniority.

As an historical article, the districts and party affiliations listed reflect those during the 28th Congress (March 4, 1843 – March 3, 1845). Seats and party affiliations on similar lists for other congresses will be different for certain members.

Seniority depends on the date on which members were sworn into office. Since many members are sworn in on the same day, subsequent ranking is based on previous congressional service of the individual and then by alphabetical order by the last name of the representative.

Committee chairmanship in the House is often associated with seniority. However, party leadership is typically not associated with seniority.

Note: The "*" indicates that the representative/delegate may have served one or more non-consecutive terms while in the House of Representatives of the United States Congress.

== U.S. House seniority list ==
U.S. House seniority
Rank	Representative	Party	District	Seniority date (Previous service, if any)	No.# of term(s)	Notes
1	Dixon H. Lewis	D	AL-03	March 4, 1829	8th term	Dean of the House; Resigned on April 22, 1844.
2	John Quincy Adams	W	MA-08	March 4, 1831	7th term	Dean of the House after Lewis resigned.
3	James Iver McKay	D	NC-06	March 4, 1831	7th term	
4	Edmund Deberry	W	NC-04	March 4, 1833; Previous service, 1829–1831.	7th term*	Left the House in 1845.
5	Henry A. Wise	D	VA-07	March 4, 1833	6th term	Resigned on February 12, 1844.
6	Reuben Chapman	D	AL-06	March 4, 1835	5th term	
7	Walter Coles	D	VA-03	March 4, 1835	5th term	Left the House in 1845.
8	John W. Jones	D	VA-06	March 4, 1835	5th term	Speaker of the House; Left the House in 1845.
9	George W. Hopkins	D	VA-13	March 4, 1835	5th term	
10	John White	W	KY-06	March 4, 1835	5th term	Left the House in 1845.
11	John Campbell	D	SC-04	March 4, 1837; Previous service, 1829–1831.	5th term*	Left the House in 1845.
12	William Parmenter	D	MA-04	March 4, 1837	4th term	Left the House in 1845.
13	Robert Rhett	D	SC-07	March 4, 1837	4th term	
14	Daniel D. Barnard	W	NY-13	March 4, 1839; Previous service, 1827–1829.	4th term*	Left the House in 1845.
15	Linn Boyd	D	KY-01	March 4, 1839; Previous service, 1835–1837.	4th term*	
16	Aaron V. Brown	D	TN-06	March 4, 1839	3rd term	Left the House in 1845.
17	Edmund Burke	D	NH	March 4, 1839	3rd term	Left the House in 1845.
18	Edward Cross	D	AR	March 4, 1839	3rd term	Left the House in 1845.
19	Garrett Davis	W	KY-08	March 4, 1839	3rd term	
20	Willis Green	W	KY-02	March 4, 1839	3rd term	Left the House in 1845.
21	Isaac E. Holmes	D	SC-06	March 4, 1839	3rd term	
22	Cave Johnson	D	TN-09	March 4, 1839; Previous service, 1829–1837.	7th term*	Left the House in 1845.
23	Kenneth Rayner	W	NC-09	March 4, 1839	3rd term	Left the House in 1845.
24	Lewis Steenrod	D	VA-15	March 4, 1839	3rd term	Left the House in 1845.
25	Jacob Thompson	D	MS	March 4, 1839	3rd term	
26	John B. Weller	D	OH-02	March 4, 1839	3rd term	Left the House in 1845.
27	Osmyn Baker	W	MA-06	January 14, 1840	3rd term	Left the House in 1845.
28	Archibald H. Arrington	D	NC-08	March 4, 1841	2nd term	Left the House in 1845.
29	Benjamin A. Bidlack	D	PA-11	March 4, 1841	2nd term	Left the House in 1845.
30	Jeremiah Brown	W	PA-08	March 4, 1841	2nd term	Left the House in 1845.
31	Milton Brown	W	TN-11	March 4, 1841	2nd term	
32	Barker Burnell	W	MA-10	March 4, 1841	2nd term	Died on June 15, 1843.
33	James G. Clinton	D	NY-09	March 4, 1841	2nd term	Left the House in 1845.
34	John Reeves Jones Daniel	D	NC-07	March 4, 1841	2nd term	
35	Richard D. Davis	D	NY-08	March 4, 1841	2nd term	Left the House in 1845.
36	John B. Dawson	D	LA-03	March 4, 1841	2nd term	
37	Ezra Dean	D	OH-18	March 4, 1841	2nd term	Left the House in 1845.
38	Thomas W. Gilmer	D	VA-05	March 4, 1841	2nd term	Resigned on February 16, 1844.
39	George S. Houston	D	AL-05	March 4, 1841	2nd term	
40	Edmund Hubard	D	VA-04	March 4, 1841	2nd term	
41	Charles J. Ingersoll	D	PA-04	March 4, 1841; Previous service, 1813–1815.	3rd term*	
42	James Irvin	W	PA-17	March 4, 1841	2nd term	
43	Andrew Kennedy	D	IN-10	March 4, 1841	2nd term	
44	John P. Kennedy	W	MD-04	March 4, 1841; Previous service, 1838–1839.	3rd term*	Left the House in 1845.
45	James Mathews	D	OH-16	March 4, 1841	2nd term	Left the House in 1845.
46	William W. Payne	D	AL-04	March 4, 1841	2nd term	
47	John Randall Reding	D	NH	March 4, 1841	2nd term	Left the House in 1845.
48	George B. Rodney	W	DE	March 4, 1841	2nd term	Left the House in 1845.
49	Romulus Mitchell Saunders	D	NC-05	March 4, 1841; Previous service, 1821–1827.	5th term*	Left the House in 1845.
50	George W. Summers	W	VA-14	March 4, 1841	2nd term	Left the House in 1845.
51	Charles Hudson	W	MA-05	May 3, 1841	2nd term	
52	Joseph R. Ingersoll	W	PA-02	October 12, 1841; Previous service, 1835–1837.	3rd term*	
53	Edward J. Black	D	GA	January 3, 1842; Previous service, 1839–1841.	3rd term*	Left the House in 1845.
54	Mark Anthony Cooper	D	GA	January 3, 1842; Previous service, 1839–1841.	3rd term*	Resigned on June 26, 1843.
55	Almon H. Read	D	PA-12	March 18, 1842	2nd term	Died on June 3, 1844.
56	Robert C. Winthrop	W	MA-01	November 29, 1842; Previous service, 1840–1842.	4th term*	
57	Joshua R. Giddings	W	OH-20	December 5, 1842; Previous service, 1838–1842.	5th term*	
58	Amos Abbott	W	MA-03	March 4, 1843	1st term	
59	Joseph H. Anderson	D	NY-07	March 4, 1843	1st term	
60	John B. Ashe	W	TN-10	March 4, 1843	1st term	Left the House in 1845.
61	Archibald Atkinson	D	VA-01	March 4, 1843	1st term	
62	Daniel Moreau Barringer	W	NC-02	March 4, 1843	1st term	
63	Samuel Beardsley	D	NY-20	March 4, 1843; Previous service, 1831–1836.	4th term*	Resigned on February 29, 1844.
64	James E. Belser	D	AL-02	March 4, 1843	1st term	Left the House in 1845.
65	Charles S. Benton	D	NY-17	March 4, 1843	1st term	
66	James Black	D	PA-16	March 4, 1843; Previous service, 1836–1837.	2nd term*	
67	James A. Black	D	SC-01	March 4, 1843	1st term	
68	Julius W. Blackwell	D	TN-03	March 4, 1843; Previous service, 1839–1841.	2nd term*	Left the House in 1845.
69	Gustavus Miller Bower	W	MO	March 4, 1843	1st term	Left the House in 1845.
70	James B. Bowlin	D	MO	March 4, 1843	1st term	
71	Francis Brengle	W	MD-02	March 4, 1843	1st term	Left the House in 1845.
72	Pierre Bossier	D	LA-04	March 4, 1843	1st term	Died on April 24, 1844.
73	Alcée Louis la Branche	D	LA-02	March 4, 1843	1st term	Left the House in 1845.
74	Henry R. Brinkerhoff	D	OH-21	March 4, 1843	1st term	Died on April 30, 1844.
75	Jacob Brinkerhoff	D	OH-11	March 4, 1843	1st term	
76	Richard Brodhead	D	PA-10	March 4, 1843	1st term	
77	William J. Brown	D	IN-05	March 4, 1843	1st term	Left the House in 1845.
78	Joseph Buffington	W	PA-24	March 4, 1843	1st term	
79	Armistead Burt	D	SC-05	March 4, 1843	1st term	
80	George Caldwell	D	KY-04	March 4, 1843	1st term	Left the House in 1845.
81	Jeremiah E. Cary	D	NY-21	March 4, 1843	1st term	Left the House in 1845.
82	George S. Catlin	D	CT-03	March 4, 1843	1st term	Left the House in 1845.
83	Charles H. Carroll	W	NY-29	March 4, 1843	1st term	
84	John Causin	W	MD-01	March 4, 1843	1st term	Left the House in 1845.
85	Augustus A. Chapman	D	VA-12	March 4, 1843	1st term	
86	Samuel Chilton	W	VA-09	March 4, 1843	1st term	Left the House in 1845.
87	Thomas L. Clingman	W	NC-01	March 4, 1843	1st term	Left the House in 1845.
88	Howell Cobb	D	GA	March 4, 1843	1st term	
89	Jacob Collamer	W	VT-02	March 4, 1843	1st term	
90	Henry Y. Cranston	W	RI-01	March 4, 1843	1st term	
91	Alvan Cullom	D	TN-04	March 4, 1843	1st term	
92	Amasa Dana	D	NY-26	March 4, 1843; Previous service, 1839–1841.	2nd term*	Left the House in 1845.
93	John W. Davis	D	IN-06	March 4, 1843; Previous service, 1835–1837 and 1839–1841.	3rd term**	
94	James Dellet	W	AL-01	March 4, 1843; Previous service, 1839–1841.	2nd term*	Left the House in 1845.
95	John Dickey	W	PA-20	March 4, 1843	1st term	Left the House in 1845.
96	David W. Dickinson	W	TN-07	March 4, 1843; Previous service, 1833–1835.	2nd term*	Left the House in 1845.
97	Paul Dillingham	D	VT-04	March 4, 1843	1st term	
98	Stephen A. Douglas	D	IL-05	March 4, 1843	1st term	
99	George Dromgoole	D	VA-02	March 4, 1843; Previous service, 1835–1841.	4th term*	
100	Alexander Duncan	D	OH-01	March 4, 1843; Previous service, 1837–1841.	3rd term*	Left the House in 1845.
101	Robert P. Dunlap	D	ME-02	March 4, 1843	1st term	
102	Chesselden Ellis	D	NY-16	March 4, 1843	1st term	Left the House in 1845.
103	Lucius Elmer	D	NJ-01	March 4, 1843	1st term	Left the House in 1845.
104	Isaac G. Farlee	D	NJ-03	March 4, 1843	1st term	Left the House in 1845.
105	Elias Florence	W	OH-09	March 4, 1843	1st term	Left the House in 1845.
106	Orlando B. Ficklin	D	IL-03	March 4, 1843	1st term	
107	Solomon Foot	W	VT-01	March 4, 1843	1st term	
108	Henry D. Foster	D	PA-19	March 4, 1843	1st term	
109	Richard French	D	KY-09	March 4, 1843; Previous service, 1835–1837.	2nd term*	Left the House in 1845.
110	Henry Frick	W	PA-13	March 4, 1843	1st term	Died on March 1, 1844.
111	Byram Green	D	NY-27	March 4, 1843	1st term	Left the House in 1845.
112	Henry Grider	W	KY-03	March 4, 1843	1st term	
113	John P. Hale	D	NH	March 4, 1843	1st term	
114	Hannibal Hamlin	D	ME-06	March 4, 1843	1st term	
115	William H. Hammett	D	MS	March 4, 1843	1st term	Left the House in 1845.
116	Hugh A. Haralson	D	GA	March 4, 1843	1st term	
117	John J. Hardin	W	IL-07	March 4, 1843	1st term	Left the House in 1845.
118	Alexander Harper	W	OH-14	March 4, 1843; Previous service, 1837–1839.	2nd term*	Left the House in 1845.
119	Samuel Hays	D	PA-22	March 4, 1843	1st term	Left the House in 1845.
120	Thomas J. Henley	D	IN-02	March 4, 1843	1st term	
121	Joshua Herrick	D	ME-01	March 4, 1843	1st term	Left the House in 1845.
122	Joseph P. Hoge	D	IL-06	March 4, 1843	1st term	
123	William Spring Hubbell	D	NY-30	March 4, 1843	1st term	Left the House in 1845.
124	James M. Hughes	D	MO	March 4, 1843	1st term	Left the House in 1845.
125	James B. Hunt	D	MI-03	March 4, 1843	1st term	
126	Washington Hunt	W	NY-34	March 4, 1843	1st term	
127	Orville Hungerford	D	NY-19	March 4, 1843	1st term	
128	John Jameson	D	MO	March 4, 1843; Previous service, 1839–1841.	2nd term*	Left the House in 1845.
129	Michael H. Jenks	W	PA-06	March 4, 1843	1st term	Left the House in 1845.
130	Andrew Johnson	D	TN-01	March 4, 1843	1st term	
131	Perley B. Johnson	W	OH-13	March 4, 1843	1st term	Left the House in 1845.
132	George W. Jones	D	TN-05	March 4, 1843	1st term	
133	Littleton Kirkpatrick	D	NJ-04	March 4, 1843	1st term	Left the House in 1845.
134	Daniel P. King	W	MA-02	March 4, 1843	1st term	
135	Preston King	D	NY-18	March 4, 1843	1st term	
136	John B. Lamar	D	GA	March 4, 1843	1st term	Resigned on July 29, 1843.
137	Moses G. Leonard	D	NY-05	March 4, 1843	1st term	Left the House in 1845.
138	William Lucas	D	VA-10	March 4, 1843; Previous service, 1839–1841.	2nd term*	Left the House in 1845.
139	John Henry Lumpkin	D	GA	March 4, 1843	1st term	
140	Lucius Lyon	D	MI-02	March 4, 1843; Previous service, 1833–1835.	2nd term*	Left the House in 1845.
141	William B. Maclay	D	NY-04	March 4, 1843	1st term	
142	George P. Marsh	W	VT-03	March 4, 1843	1st term	
143	William C. McCauslen	D	OH-17	March 4, 1843	1st term	Left the House in 1845.
144	Robert McClelland	D	MI-01	March 4, 1843	1st term	
145	John A. McClernand	D	IL-02	March 4, 1843	1st term	
146	Felix Grundy McConnell	D	AL-07	March 4, 1843	1st term	
147	Joseph J. McDowell	D	OH-07	March 4, 1843	1st term	
148	Abraham R. McIlvaine	W	PA-07	March 4, 1843	1st term	
149	John Millen	D	GA	March 4, 1843	1st term	Died on October 15, 1843.
150	Heman A. Moore	D	OH-10	March 4, 1843	1st term	Died on April 3, 1844.
151	Edward Joy Morris	W	PA-01	March 4, 1843	1st term	Left the House in 1845.
152	Joseph Morris	D	OH-15	March 4, 1843	1st term	
153	Freeman H. Morse	W	ME-04	March 4, 1843	1st term	Left the House in 1845.
154	William A. Moseley	W	NY-32	March 4, 1843	1st term	
155	Henry C. Murphy	D	NY-02	March 4, 1843	1st term	Left the House in 1845.
156	Henry Nes	W	PA-15	March 4, 1843	1st term	Left the House in 1845.
157	Willoughby Newton	W	VA-08	March 4, 1843	1st term	Left the House in 1845.
158	Moses Norris, Jr.	D	NH	March 4, 1843	1st term	
159	Robert D. Owen	D	IN-01	March 4, 1843	1st term	
160	Thomas J. Paterson	W	NY-28	March 4, 1843	1st term	Left the House in 1845.
161	John Pettit	D	IN-08	March 4, 1843	1st term	
162	Joseph Hopkins Peyton	W	TN-08	March 4, 1843	1st term	
163	Jonas P. Phoenix	W	NY-03	March 4, 1843	1st term	Left the House in 1845.
164	Elisha R. Potter	W	RI-02	March 4, 1843	1st term	Left the House in 1845.
165	Emery D. Potter	D	OH-05	March 4, 1843	1st term	Left the House in 1845.
166	Zadock Pratt	D	NY-11	March 4, 1843; Previous service, 1837–1839.	2nd term*	Left the House in 1845.
167	Jacob Alexander Preston	W	MD-05	March 4, 1843	1st term	Left the House in 1845.
168	Meade Purdy	D	NY-22	March 4, 1843	1st term	Left the House in 1845.
169	Alexander Ramsey	W	PA-14	March 4, 1843	1st term	
170	George O. Rathbun	D	NY-25	March 4, 1843	1st term	
171	Charles Manning Reed	W	PA-23	March 4, 1843	1st term	Left the House in 1845.
172	David Settle Reid	D	NC-03	March 4, 1843	1st term	
173	James H. Relfe	D	MO	March 4, 1843	1st term	
174	John Ritter	D	PA-09	March 4, 1843	1st term	
175	Robert W. Roberts	D	MS	March 4, 1843	1st term	
176	Orville Robinson	D	NY-23	March 4, 1843	1st term	Left the House in 1845.
177	Julius Rockwell	W	MA-07	March 4, 1843	1st term	
178	Charles Rogers	W	NY-14	March 4, 1843	1st term	Left the House in 1845.
179	Jeremiah Russell	D	NY-10	March 4, 1843	1st term	Left the House in 1845.
180	Samuel C. Sample	W	IN-09	March 4, 1843	1st term	Left the House in 1845.
181	Robert C. Schenck	W	OH-03	March 4, 1843	1st term	
182	Henry St. John	D	OH-06	March 4, 1843	1st term	
183	William Tandy Senter	W	TN-02	March 4, 1843	1st term	Left the House in 1845.
184	Luther Severance	W	ME-03	March 4, 1843	1st term	Left the House in 1845.
185	David L. Seymour	D	NY-12	March 4, 1843	1st term	Left the House in 1845.
186	Thomas H. Seymour	D	CT-01	March 4, 1843	1st term	Left the House in 1845.
187	Samuel Simons	D	CT-04	March 4, 1843	1st term	Left the House in 1845.
188	Richard F. Simpson	D	SC-02	March 4, 1843	1st term	
189	John Slidell	D	LA-01	March 4, 1843	1st term	
190	Albert Smith	W	NY-33	March 4, 1843	1st term	
191	Caleb B. Smith	W	IN-04	March 4, 1843	1st term	
192	John T. Smith	D	PA-03	March 4, 1843	1st term	Left the House in 1845.
193	Robert Smith	D	IL-01	March 4, 1843	1st term	
194	Thomas Smith	D	IN-03	March 4, 1843; Previous service, 1839–1841.	2nd term*	
195	Thomas Ara Spence	W	MD-06	March 4, 1843	1st term	Left the House in 1845.
196	Lemuel Stetson	D	NY-15	March 4, 1843	1st term	Left the House in 1845.
197	Andrew Stewart	W	PA-18	March 4, 1843; Previous service, 1821–1829 and 1831–1835.	6th term**	
198	John Stewart	D	CT-02	March 4, 1843	1st term	Left the House in 1845.
199	William H. Stiles	D	GA	March 4, 1843	1st term	Left the House in 1845.
200	James W. Stone	D	KY-05	March 4, 1843	1st term	Left the House in 1845.
201	Selah B. Strong	D	NY-01	March 4, 1843	1st term	Left the House in 1845.
202	George Sykes	D	NJ-02	March 4, 1843	1st term	Left the House in 1845.
203	William Taylor	D	VA-11	March 4, 1843	1st term	
204	William Thomasson	W	KY-07	March 4, 1843	1st term	
205	John W. Tibbatts	D	KY-10	March 4, 1843	1st term	
206	Daniel R. Tilden	W	OH-19	March 4, 1843	1st term	
207	Tilghman Tucker	D	MS	March 4, 1843	1st term	Left the House in 1845.
208	Asher Tyler	W	NY-31	March 4, 1843	1st term	Left the House in 1845.
209	Joseph Vance	W	OH-04	March 4, 1843; Previous service, 1821–1835.	8th term*	
210	John I. Vanmeter	W	OH-08	March 4, 1843	1st term	Left the House in 1845.
211	Samuel Finley Vinton	W	OH-12	March 4, 1843; Previous service, 1823–1837.	8th term*	
212	John Wentworth	D	IL-04	March 4, 1843	1st term	
213	John Wethered	W	MD-03	March 4, 1843	1st term	Left the House in 1845.
214	Horace Wheaton	D	NY-24	March 4, 1843	1st term	
215	Benjamin White	D	ME-05	March 4, 1843	1st term	Left the House in 1845.
216	William Wilkins	D	PA-21	March 4, 1843	1st term	Resigned on February 14, 1844.
217	Henry Williams	D	MA-09	March 4, 1843; Previous service, 1839–1841.	2nd term*	Left the House in 1845.
218	Joseph A. Wright	D	IN-07	March 4, 1843	1st term	Left the House in 1845.
219	William Wright	W	NJ-05	March 4, 1843	1st term	
220	Jacob S. Yost	D	PA-05	March 4, 1843	1st term	
221	Joseph A. Woodward	D	SC-03	March 4, 1843	1st term	
	Absalom Harris Chappell	W	GA	October 2, 1843	1st term	Left the House in 1845.
	Alexander H. Stephens	W	GA	October 2, 1843	1st term	
	Hamilton Fish	W	NY-06	December 4, 1843	1st term	Left the House in 1845.
	Joseph Grinnell	W	MA-10	December 7, 1843	1st term	
	Duncan Lamont Clinch	W	GA	February 15, 1844	1st term	Left the House in 1845.
	Cornelius Darragh	W	PA-21	March 26, 1844	1st term	
	James Pollock	W	PA-13	April 5, 1844	1st term	
	Thomas H. Bayly	D	VA-07	May 6, 1844	1st term	
	Shepard Cary	D	ME-07	May 10, 1844	1st term	Left the House in 1845.
	William L. Goggin	W	VA-05	May 10, 1844; Previous service, 1839–1843.	3rd term*	Left the House in 1845.
	Edward S. Hamlin	W	OH-21	October 8, 1844	1st term	Left the House in 1845.
	Alfred P. Stone	D	OH-10	October 8, 1844	1st term	Left the House in 1845.
	Levi D. Carpenter	D	NY-20	November 5, 1844	1st term	Left the House in 1845.
	George Fuller	D	PA-12	December 2, 1844	1st term	Left the House in 1845.
	Isaac E. Morse	D	LA-04	December 2, 1844	1st term	
	William L. Yancey	D	AL-03	December 2, 1844	1st term	

== Delegates ==
Rank	Delegate	Party	District	Seniority date (Previous service, if any)	No.# of term(s)	Notes
1	Augustus C. Dodge	D	IA	October 28, 1840	3rd term	
2	Henry Dodge	D	WI	March 4, 1841	2nd term	
3	David Levy Yulee	D	FL	March 4, 1841	2nd term	

== See also ==
- 28th United States Congress
- List of United States congressional districts
- List of United States senators in the 28th Congress
