= List of United States senators in the 28th Congress =

This is a complete list of United States senators during the 28th United States Congress listed by seniority from March 4, 1843, to March 3, 1845.

Order of service is based on the commencement of the senator's first term. Behind this is former service as a senator (only giving the senator seniority within their new incoming class), service as vice president, a House member, a cabinet secretary, or a governor of a state. The final factor is the population of the senator's state.

Senators who were sworn in during the middle of the two-year congressional term (up until the last senator who was not sworn in early after winning the November 1844 election) are listed at the end of the list with no number.

== Terms of service ==
Class	Terms of service of senators that expired in years
Class 1	Terms of service of senators that expired in 1845 (CT, DE, FL, IN, MA, MD, ME, MI, MO, MS, NJ, NY, OH, PA, RI, TN, VA, and VT.)
Class 2	Terms of service of senators that expired in 1847 (AL, AR, DE, GA, IL, KY, LA, MA, ME, MI, MS, NC, NH, NJ, RI, SC, TN, and VA.)
Class 3	Terms of service of senators that expired in 1849 (AL, AR, CA, CT, FL, GA, IL, IN, KY, LA, MD, MO, NC, NH, NY, OH, PA, SC, and VT.)

== U.S. Senate seniority list ==
U.S. Senate seniority
Rank	Senator (party-state)	Seniority date	Other factors
1	William Rufus de Vane King (D-AL)	December 14, 1819	
2	Thomas Hart Benton (D-MO)	August 10, 1821	
3	Silas Wright, Jr. (D-NY)	January 4, 1833	
4	Nathaniel Pitcher Tallmadge (W-NY)	March 4, 1833	
5	Lewis Fields Linn (D-MO)	October 25, 1833	
6	James Buchanan (D-PA)	December 6, 1834	
7	Robert John Walker (D-MS)	March 4, 1835	
8	William Cabell Rives (W-VA)	March 4, 1836	
9	Richard Henry Bayard (W-DE)	June 17, 1836	
10	Ambrose Hundley Sevier (D-AR)	September 18, 1836	Former delegate
11	William Savin Fulton (D-AR)	September 18, 1836	
12	Thomas Clayton (W-DE)	January 9, 1837	
13	William Allen (D-OH)	March 4, 1837	
14	William Duhurst Merrick (W-MD)	January 4, 1838	
15	Albert Smith White (W-IN)	March 4, 1839	Former representative
16	Benjamin Tappan (D-OH)	March 4, 1839	Ohio 5th in population (1830)
17	Samuel Shethar Phelps (W-VT)	March 4, 1839	Vermont 17th in population (1830)
18	John Henderson (W-MS)	March 4, 1839	Mississippi 22nd in population (1830)
19	Daniel Sturgeon (D-PA)	January 14, 1840	
20	Augustus Seymour Porter (W-MI)	January 20, 1840	
21	Jabez Williams Huntington (W-CT)	May 4, 1840	
22	Willie Person Mangum (W-NC)	November 25, 1840	
23	Isaac Chapman Bates (W-MA)	January 13, 1841	
24	Rufus Choate (W-MA)	February 23, 1841	
25	Levi Woodbury (D-NH)	March 4, 1841	Former senator (5 years)
26	John M. Berrien (W-GA)	March 4, 1841	Former senator (4 years)
27	William Segar Archer (W-VA)	March 4, 1841	Former representative (15 years)
28	George Evans (W-ME)	March 4, 1841	Former representative (11 years)
29	William Woodbridge (W-MI)	March 4, 1841	Former delegate (1 year)
30	James Turner Morehead (W-KY)	March 4, 1841	Former governor
31	Jacob Welsh Miller (W-NJ)	March 4, 1841	New Jersey 14th in population (1830)
32	Alexander Barrow (W-LA)	March 4, 1841	Louisiana 19th in population (1830)
33	Samuel McRoberts (D-IL)	March 4, 1841	Illinois 20th in population (1830)
34	James F. Simmons (W-RI)	March 4, 1841	Rhode Island 23rd in population (1830)
35	Arthur Pendleton Bagby (D-AL)	November 24, 1841	
36	William Sprague III (W-RI)	February 18, 1842	
37	John Jordan Crittenden (W-KY)	March 31, 1842	
38	William Lewis Dayton (W-NJ)	July 2, 1842	
39	George McDuffie (D-SC)	December 23, 1842	
40	John Milton Niles (D-CT)	March 4, 1843	Former senator
41	James Alfred Pearce (W-MD)	March 4, 1843	Former representative (6 years); Maryland 15th in population (1840)
42	Charles Gordon Atherton (D-NH)	March 4, 1843	Former representative (6 years); New Hampshire 22nd in population (1840)
43	Edward Allen Hannegan (D-IN)	March 4, 1843	Former representative (4 years)
44	Walter Terry Colquitt (D-GA)	March 4, 1843	Former representative (1 year)
45	William Henry Haywood, Jr. (D-NC)	March 4, 1843	North Carolina 7th in population (1840)
46	Daniel Elliott Huger (D-SC)	March 4, 1843	South Carolina 11th in population (1840)
47	Sidney Breese (D-IL)	March 4, 1843	Illinois 14th in population (1840)
48	William Upham (W-VT)	March 4, 1843	Vermont 21st in population (1840)
	David Rice Atchison (D-MO)	October 14, 1843	
49	Ephraim Hubbard Foster (W-TN)	October 17, 1843	Former senator
50	Spencer Jarnagin (W-TN)	October 17, 1843	
51	John Fairfield (D-ME)	December 4, 1843	Maine 13th in population (1840)
	James Semple (D-IL)	December 4, 1843	Illinois 14th in population (1840)
	John Brown Francis (LO-RI)	January 25, 1844	
52	Henry Johnson (W-LA)	February 12, 1844	
	Dixon Hall Lewis (D-AL)	April 22, 1844	
	Chester Ashley (D-AR)	November 8, 1844	
	Henry A. Foster (D-NY)	November 30, 1844	Former representative
	Daniel Stevens Dickinson (D-NY)	November 30, 1844	
	John Adams Dix (D-NY)	January 27, 1845	

== See also ==
- 28th United States Congress
- List of United States representatives in the 28th Congress
