= Bossier =

Bossier may refer to:

- Bossier City, Louisiana
- Bossier Parish, Louisiana
- Pierre Bossier, French explorer for whom Bossier City and Parish are named
