= Senator Root (disambiguation) =

Elihu Root (1845–1937) was a U.S. Senator from New York from 1909 to 1915. Senator Root may also refer to:

- Erastus Root (1773–1846), New York State Senate
- Joseph M. Root (1807–1879), Ohio State Senate
