= 28th United States Congress =

1843-1845 U.S. Congress

←	27th	29th	→
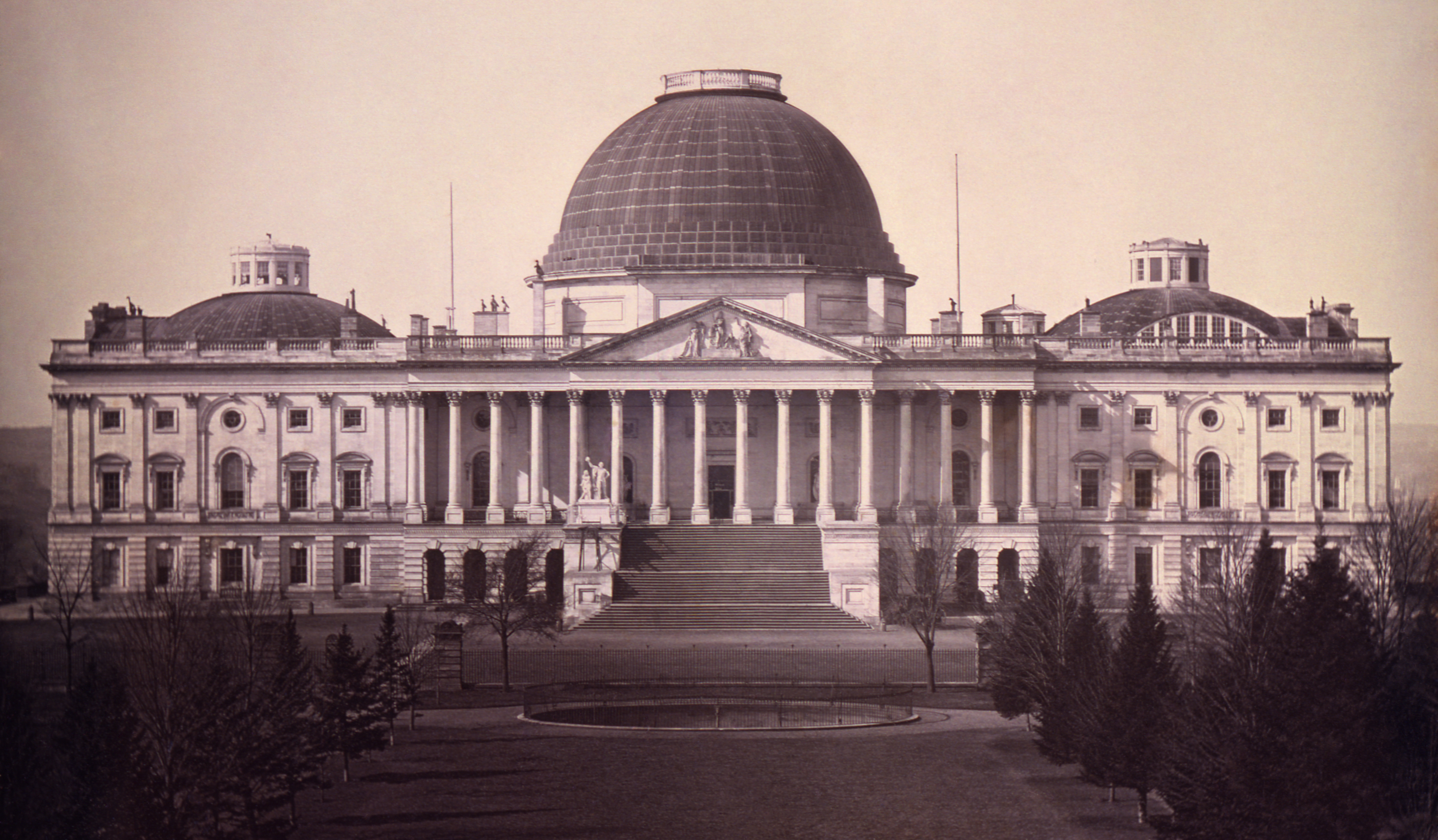
- United States Capitol (1846)

Overview
- Legislative body: United States Congress
- Jurisdiction: United States
- Term: March 4, 1843 – March 4, 1845

Senate
- Members: 54
- President: Vacant (Note: President Pro Tempore Willie P. Mangum acted his duties as the President of the Senate.)
- President pro tempore: Willie P. Mangum (W)
- Party control: Whig

House of Representatives
- Members: 223 representatives 3 non-voting delegates
- Speaker: John W. Jones (D)
- Party control: Democratic

Sessions
- 1st: December 4, 1843 – June 17, 1844
- 2nd: December 2, 1844 – March 3, 1845

The 28th United States Congress was a meeting of the legislative branch of the United States federal government, consisting of the United States Senate and the United States House of Representatives. It met in Washington, D.C., from March 4, 1843, to March 4, 1845, during the third and fourth years of John Tyler's presidency. The apportionment of seats in this House of Representatives was based on the 1840 United States census. The Senate had a Whig majority, and the House had a Democratic majority.

== Major events ==
- May 24, 1844: The first electrical telegram was sent by Samuel F. B. Morse from the U.S. Capitol to the B&O Railroad "outer depot" in Baltimore, Maryland, saying "What hath God wrought".
- December 4, 1844: U.S. presidential election, 1844: James K. Polk defeated Henry Clay

== Major legislation ==
- January 23, 1845: Presidential Election Day Act, ch. 1, 5 Stat. 721
- March 3, 1845: For the first time, Congress overrode a Presidential veto. An act relating to revenue cutters and steamers was thereby enacted as the last Act of the 28th Congress: session II, ch. 78, 5 Stat. 795.

== Treaties ==
- July 3, 1844: Treaty of Wanghia which was signed with the Qing Empire. The treaty established five U.S. treaty ports in China with extraterritoriality and was the first unequal treaty that the country imposed on the dynasty.

== States admitted ==
- March 1, 1845: Resolution for the Annexation of Texas, 5 Stat. 797 (Admitted in the next Congress, December 29, 1845.)
- March 3, 1845: Florida admitted, 5 Stat. 742. The statute also allowed for the provisional admission of Iowa, pending a referendum in that state. (Admitted in the next Congress, December 28, 1846.)

== Party summary ==
=== Senate ===
During this congress, two Senate seats were added for the new state of Florida.

	Party (shading shows control)			Total	Vacant
	Democratic (D)	Law and Order (LO)	Whig (W)	Total	Vacant
End of previous congress	20	0	29	49	3
Begin	22	0	27	49	3
End	23	1	27	51	3
Final voting share	45.1%	2.0%	52.9%		
Beginning of next congress	26	0	24	50	4

=== House of Representatives ===
Following the 1840 United States census, Congress reapportioned the House to include 223 seats. During this congress, one House seat was added for the new state of Florida.

	Party (shading shows control)						Total	Vacant
	Democratic (D)	Independent Democratic (ID)	Law and Order (LO)	Whig (W)	Independent Whig (IW)	Other	Total	Vacant
End of previous congress	100	1	0	139	0	0	240	1
Begin	147	1	2	72	1	0	223	0
End	141	1	2	78	1	0	223	1
Final voting share	63.2%	0.4%	0.9%	35.0%	0.4%	0.0%		
Beginning of next congress	138	0	0	78	0	6	222	2

== Leadership ==
=== Senate ===
- President: Vacant
- President pro tempore: Willie P. Mangum (W)

=== House of Representatives ===
- Speaker: John W. Jones (D)

== Members ==
This list is arranged by chamber, then by state. Senators are listed by class, and representatives are listed by district.

=== Senate ===
Senators were elected by the state legislatures every two years, with one-third beginning new six-year terms with each Congress. Preceding the names in the list below are Senate class numbers, which indicate the cycle of their election. In this Congress, Class 1 meant their term ended with this Congress, requiring reelection in 1844; Class 2 meant their term began in the last Congress, requiring reelection in 1846; and Class 3 meant their term began in this Congress, requiring reelection in 1848.

Skip to House of Representatives, below

==== Alabama ====
▌2. William R. King (D), until April 15, 1844

▌Dixon H. Lewis (D), from April 22, 1844

▌3. Arthur P. Bagby (D)

==== Arkansas ====
▌2. William S. Fulton (D), until August 15, 1844

▌Chester Ashley (D), from November 8, 1844

▌3. Ambrose H. Sevier (D)

==== Connecticut ====
▌1. Jabez W. Huntington (W)
▌3. John M. Niles (D)

==== Delaware ====
▌1. Richard H. Bayard (W)
▌2. Thomas Clayton (W)

==== Florida ====
1: Vacant from March 3, 1845, admission
2: Vacant from March 3, 1845, admission

==== Georgia ====
▌2. John MacPherson Berrien (W)
▌3. Walter T. Colquitt (D)

==== Illinois ====
▌2. Samuel McRoberts (D), until March 27, 1843

▌James Semple (D), from December 4, 1843

▌3. Sidney Breese (D)

==== Indiana ====
▌1. Albert S. White (W)
▌3. Edward A. Hannegan (D)

==== Kentucky ====
▌2. James T. Morehead (W)
▌3. John J. Crittenden (W)

==== Louisiana ====
▌2. Alexander Barrow (W)
▌3. Alexander Porter (W), until January 13, 1844

▌Henry Johnson (W), from February 12, 1844

==== Maine ====
▌1. John Fairfield (D), from December 4, 1843
▌2. George Evans (W)

==== Maryland ====
▌1. William D. Merrick (W)
▌3. James A. Pearce (W)

==== Massachusetts ====
▌1. Rufus Choate (W)
▌2. Isaac C. Bates (W)

==== Michigan ====
▌1. Augustus S. Porter (W)
▌2. William Woodbridge (W)

==== Mississippi ====
▌1. John Henderson (W)
▌2. Robert J. Walker (D)

==== Missouri ====
▌1. Thomas H. Benton (D)
▌3. Lewis F. Linn (D), until October 3, 1843

▌David R. Atchison (D), from October 14, 1843

==== New Hampshire ====
▌2. Levi Woodbury (D)
▌3. Charles G. Atherton (D)

==== New Jersey ====
▌1. William L. Dayton (W)
▌2. Jacob W. Miller (W)

==== New York ====
▌1. Nathaniel P. Tallmadge (W), until June 17, 1844

▌Daniel S. Dickinson (D), from November 30, 1844

▌3. Silas Wright Jr. (D), until November 26, 1844

▌Henry A. Foster (D), November 30, 1844 – January 27, 1845
▌John A. Dix (D), from January 27, 1845

==== North Carolina ====
▌2. Willie P. Mangum (W)
▌3. William H. Haywood Jr. (D)

==== Ohio ====
▌1. Benjamin Tappan (D)
▌3. William Allen (D)

==== Pennsylvania ====
▌1. Daniel Sturgeon (D)
▌3. James Buchanan (D)

==== Rhode Island ====
▌1. William Sprague III (W), until January 17, 1844

▌John B. Francis (LO), from January 25, 1844

▌2. James F. Simmons (W)

==== South Carolina ====
▌2. Daniel E. Huger (D), until March 3, 1845
▌3. George McDuffie (D)

==== Tennessee ====
▌1. Ephraim H. Foster (W), from October 17, 1843
▌2. Spencer Jarnagin (W), from October 17, 1843

==== Vermont ====
▌1. Samuel S. Phelps (W)
▌3. William Upham (W)

==== Virginia ====
▌1. William C. Rives (W)
▌2. William S. Archer (W)

Senators' party membership by state at the opening of the 28th Congress in March 1843. Tennessee's senators were not seated until October 17, 1843. 2 Democrats 1 Democrat and 1 Whig 2 Whigs

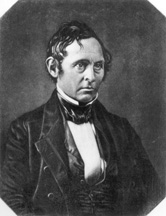
President pro tempore Willie P. Mangum

=== House of Representatives ===
Representatives are listed by their district numbers.

==== Alabama ====
▌1. James Dellet (W)
▌2. James E. Belser (D)
▌3. Dixon H. Lewis (D), until April 22, 1844

▌William L. Yancey (D), from December 2, 1844

▌4. William W. Payne (D)
▌5. George S. Houston (D)
▌6. Reuben Chapman (D)
▌7. Felix G. McConnell (D)

==== Arkansas ====
▌At-large. Edward Cross (D)

==== Connecticut ====
▌1. Thomas H. Seymour (D)
▌2. John Stewart (D)
▌3. George S. Catlin (D)
▌4. Samuel Simons (D)

==== Delaware ====
▌At-large. George B. Rodney (W)

==== Florida ====
At-large: Vacant from March 3, 1845, admission

==== Georgia ====
All representatives were elected statewide on a general ticket.

▌At-large. Edward J. Black (D)
▌At-large. Howell Cobb (D)
▌At-large. Mark A. Cooper (D), until June 26, 1843

▌Alexander H. Stephens (W), from October 2, 1843

▌At-large. Hugh A. Haralson (D)
▌At-large. John B. Lamar (D), until July 29, 1843

▌Absalom H. Chappell (W), from October 2, 1843

▌At-large. John H. Lumpkin (D)
▌At-large. John Millen (D), until October 15, 1843

▌Duncan L. Clinch (W), from February 15, 1844

▌At-large. William H. Stiles (D)

==== Illinois ====
▌1. Robert Smith (D)
▌2. John A. McClernand (D)
▌3. Orlando B. Ficklin (D)
▌4. John Wentworth (D)
▌5. Stephen A. Douglas (D)
▌6. Joseph P. Hoge (D)
▌7. John J. Hardin (W)

==== Indiana ====
▌1. Robert D. Owen (D)
▌2. Thomas J. Henley (D)
▌3. Thomas Smith (D)
▌4. Caleb B. Smith (W)
▌5. William J. Brown (D)
▌6. John W. Davis (D)
▌7. Joseph A. Wright (D)
▌8. John Pettit (D)
▌9. Samuel C. Sample (W)
▌10. Andrew Kennedy (D)

==== Kentucky ====
▌1. Linn Boyd (D)
▌2. Willis Green (W)
▌3. Henry Grider (W)
▌4. George Caldwell (D)
▌5. James W. Stone (D)
▌6. John White (W)
▌7. William P. Thomasson (W)
▌8. Garrett Davis (W)
▌9. Richard French (D)
▌10. John W. Tibbatts (D)

==== Louisiana ====
▌1. John Slidell (D)
▌2. Alcée L. La Branche (D)
▌3. John B. Dawson (D)
▌4. Pierre E. J. B. Bossier (D), until April 24, 1844

▌Isaac E. Morse (D), from December 2, 1844

==== Maine ====
▌1. Joshua Herrick (D)
▌2. Robert P. Dunlap (D)
▌3. Luther Severance (W)
▌4. Freeman H. Morse (W)
▌5. Benjamin White (D)
▌6. Hannibal Hamlin (D)
▌7. Shepard Cary (D) from May 10, 1844

==== Maryland ====
▌1. John M. S. Causin (W)
▌2. Francis Brengle (W)
▌3. John Wethered (W)
▌4. John P. Kennedy (W)
▌5. Jacob A. Preston (W)
▌6. Thomas A. Spence (W)

==== Massachusetts ====
▌1. Robert C. Winthrop (W)
▌2. Daniel P. King (W)
▌3. Amos Abbott (W)
▌4. William Parmenter (D)
▌5. Charles Hudson (W)
▌6. Osmyn Baker (W)
▌7. Julius Rockwell (W)
▌8. John Quincy Adams (W)
▌9. Henry Williams (D)
▌10. Barker Burnell (W), until June 15, 1843

▌Joseph Grinnell (W), from December 7, 1843

==== Michigan ====
▌1. Robert McClelland (D)
▌2. Lucius Lyon (D)
▌3. James B. Hunt (D)

==== Mississippi ====
All representatives were elected statewide on a general ticket.

▌At-large. William H. Hammett (D)
▌At-large. Robert W. Roberts (D)
▌At-large. Jacob Thompson (D)
▌At-large. Tilghman M. Tucker (D)

==== Missouri ====
All representatives were elected statewide on a general ticket.

▌At-large. Gustavus M. Bower (D)
▌At-large. James B. Bowlin (D)
▌At-large. James M. Hughes (D)
▌At-large. John Jameson (D)
▌At-large. James H. Relfe (D)

==== New Hampshire ====
All representatives were elected statewide on a general ticket.

▌At-large. Edmund Burke (D)
▌At-large. John P. Hale (D)
▌At-large. Moses Norris Jr. (D)
▌At-large. John R. Reding (D)

==== New Jersey ====
▌1. Lucius Q. C. Elmer (D)
▌2. George Sykes (D)
▌3. Isaac G. Farlee (D)
▌4. Littleton Kirkpatrick (D)
▌5. William Wright (Ind. W)

==== New York ====
▌1. Selah B. Strong (D)
▌2. Henry C. Murphy (D)
▌3. J. Phillips Phoenix (W)
▌4. William B. Maclay (D)
▌5. Moses G. Leonard (D)
▌6. Hamilton Fish (W)
▌7. Joseph H. Anderson (D)
▌8. Richard D. Davis (D)
▌9. James G. Clinton (D)
▌10. Jeremiah Russell (D)
▌11. Zadock Pratt (D)
▌12. David L. Seymour (D)
▌13. Daniel D. Barnard (W)
▌14. Charles Rogers (W)
▌15. Lemuel Stetson (D)
▌16. Chesselden Ellis (D)
▌17. Charles S. Benton (D)
▌18. Preston King (D)
▌19. Orville Hungerford (D)
▌20. Samuel Beardsley (D), until February 29, 1844

▌Levi D. Carpenter (D), from November 5, 1844

▌21. Jeremiah E. Cary (D)
▌22. Smith M. Purdy (D)
▌23. Orville Robinson (D)
▌24. Horace Wheaton (D)
▌25. George O. Rathbun (D)
▌26. Amasa Dana (D)
▌27. Byram Green (D)
▌28. Thomas J. Paterson (W)
▌29. Charles H. Carroll (W)
▌30. William S. Hubbell (D)
▌31. Asher Tyler (W)
▌32. William A. Moseley (W)
▌33. Albert Smith (W)
▌34. Washington Hunt (W)

==== North Carolina ====
▌1. Thomas L. Clingman (W)
▌2. Daniel M. Barringer (W)
▌3. David S. Reid (D)
▌4. Edmund Deberry (W)
▌5. Romulus M. Saunders (D)
▌6. James I. McKay (D)
▌7. John R. J. Daniel (D)
▌8. Archibald H. Arrington (D)
▌9. Kenneth Rayner (W)

==== Ohio ====
▌1. Alexander Duncan (D)
▌2. John B. Weller (D)
▌3. Robert C. Schenck (W)
▌4. Joseph Vance (W)
▌5. Emery D. Potter (D)
▌6. Henry St. John (D)
▌7. Joseph J. McDowell (D)
▌8. John I. Vanmeter (W)
▌9. Elias Florence (W)
▌10. Heman Allen Moore (D), until April 3, 1844

▌Alfred P. Stone (D), from October 8, 1844

▌11. Jacob Brinkerhoff (D)
▌12. Samuel F. Vinton (W)
▌13. Perley B. Johnson (W)
▌14. Alexander Harper (W)
▌15. Joseph Morris (D)
▌16. James Mathews (D)
▌17. William C. McCauslen (D)
▌18. Ezra Dean (D)
▌19. Daniel R. Tilden (W)
▌20. Joshua R. Giddings (W)
▌21. Henry R. Brinkerhoff (D), until April 30, 1844

▌Edward S. Hamlin (W), from October 8, 1844

==== Pennsylvania ====
▌1. Edward Joy Morris (W)
▌2. Joseph R. Ingersoll (W)
▌3. John T. Smith (D)
▌4. Charles J. Ingersoll (D)
▌5. Jacob S. Yost (D)
▌6. Michael H. Jenks (W)
▌7. Abraham R. McIlvaine (W)
▌8. Jeremiah Brown (W)
▌9. John Ritter (D)
▌10. Richard Brodhead (D)
▌11. Benjamin A. Bidlack (D)
▌12. Almon H. Read (D), until June 3, 1844

▌George Fuller (D), from December 2, 1844

▌13. Henry Frick (W), until March 1, 1844

▌James Pollock (W), from April 5, 1844

▌14. Alexander Ramsey (W)
▌15. Henry Nes (Ind. D)
▌16. James Black (D)
▌17. James Irvin (W)
▌18. Andrew Stewart (W)
▌19. Henry D. Foster (D)
▌20. John Dickey (W)
▌21. William Wilkins (D), until February 14, 1844

▌Cornelius Darragh (W), from March 26, 1844

▌22. Samuel Hays (D)
▌23. Charles M. Reed (W)
▌24. Joseph Buffington (W)

==== Rhode Island ====
1. Henry Y. Cranston (LO)
2. Elisha R. Potter Jr. (LO)

==== South Carolina ====
▌1. James A. Black (D)
▌2. Richard F. Simpson (D)
▌3. Joseph A. Woodward (D)
▌4. John Campbell (D)
▌5. Armistead Burt (D)
▌6. Isaac E. Holmes (D)
▌7. Robert Rhett (D)

==== Tennessee ====
▌1. Andrew Johnson (D)
▌2. William T. Senter (W)
▌3. Julius W. Blackwell (D)
▌4. Alvan Cullom (D)
▌5. George W. Jones (D)
▌6. Aaron V. Brown (D)
▌7. David W. Dickinson (W)
▌8. Joseph H. Peyton (W)
▌9. Cave Johnson (D)
▌10. John B. Ashe (W)
▌11. Milton Brown (W)

==== Vermont ====
▌1. Solomon Foot (W)
▌2. Jacob Collamer (W)
▌3. George P. Marsh (W)
▌4. Paul Dillingham Jr. (D)

==== Virginia ====
▌1. Archibald Atkinson (D)
▌2. George C. Dromgoole (D)
▌3. Walter Coles (D)
▌4. Edmund W. Hubard (D)
▌5. Thomas W. Gilmer (D), until February 16, 1844

▌William L. Goggin (W), from April 25, 1844

▌6. John W. Jones (D)
▌7. Henry A. Wise (D), until February 12, 1844

▌Thomas H. Bayly (D), from May 6, 1844

▌8. Willoughby Newton (W)
▌9. Samuel Chilton (W)
▌10. William Lucas (D)
▌11. William Taylor (D)
▌12. Augustus A. Chapman (D)
▌13. George W. Hopkins (D)
▌14. George W. Summers (W)
▌15. Lewis Steenrod (D)

==== Non-voting members ====
▌Florida Territory. David Levy Yulee (D), until March 3, 1845
▌Iowa Territory. Augustus C. Dodge (D)
▌Wisconsin Territory. Henry Dodge (D)

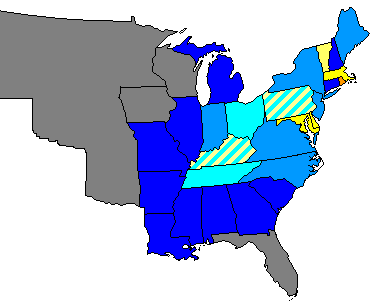
House seats by party holding plurality in state: 80+ to 100% Democratic / Up to 60% Whig; 60+ to 80% Democratic / 60+ to 80% Whig; Up to 60% Democratic / 80+ to 100% Whig; 100% Law and Order Party of RI

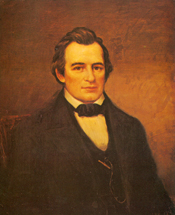
Speaker John Winston Jones

== Changes in membership ==
The count below reflects changes from the beginning of the first session of this Congress.

=== Senate ===
- Replacements: 7
  - Democrats (D): no net change
  - Whigs (W): 1 seat net loss
  - Law and Order (LO): 1 seat net gain
- Deaths: 3
- Resignations: 5
- Interim appointments: 1
- Total seats with changes: 10

Senate changes
State (class)	Vacated by	Reason for change	Successor	Date of successor's formal installation (Note: When seated or oath administered, not necessarily when service began.)
Tennessee (1)	Vacant	Senator Alfred O. P. Nicholson (D) resigned in 26th Congress. Successor elected October 17, 1843.	Ephraim H. Foster (W)	Elected October 17, 1843
Tennessee (2)	Vacant	Failure to elect. Successor elected October 17, 1843.	Spencer Jarnagin (W)	Elected October 17, 1843
Maine (1)	Vacant	Senator Reuel Williams (D) resigned in previous congress. Successor elected December 4, 1843.	John Fairfield (D)	Elected December 4, 1843
Louisiana (3)	Alexander Porter (W)	Elected but, due to ill health, never took his seat. Incumbent died January 13, 1844. Successor elected February 12, 1844.	Henry Johnson (W)	Elected February 12, 1844
Illinois (2)	Samuel McRoberts (D)	Died March 27, 1843. Successor appointed December 4, 1843, to continue the term until an election. Appointee was later elected, on an unknown date.	James Semple (D)	Seated December 4, 1843
Missouri (3)	Lewis F. Linn (D)	Died October 3, 1843. Successor appointed October 14, 1843, to continue the term until an election. Appointee was later elected, on an unknown date in 1843.	David R. Atchison (D)	Seated October 14, 1843
Rhode Island (1)	William Sprague (W)	Resigned January 17, 1844. Successor elected January 25, 1844.	John B. Francis (LO)	Seated January 25, 1844
Alabama (2)	William R. King (D)	Resigned April 15, 1844, after being appointed U.S. Minister to France. Successor appointed April 22, 1844, to finish the term.	Dixon H. Lewis (D)	Seated April 22, 1844
New York (1)	Nathaniel P. Tallmadge (W)	Resigned June 17, 1844, after being appointed Governor of Wisconsin Territory. Successor was appointed November 30, 1945. Appointee was later elected January 18, 1845.	Daniel S. Dickinson (D)	Seated December 9, 1844
Arkansas (2)	William S. Fulton (D)	Died August 15, 1844. Successor elected November 8, 1844.	Chester Ashley (D)	Seated November 8, 1844
New York (3)	Silas Wright (D)	Resigned November 26, 1844, after being elected Governor of New York. Successor appointed November 30, 1945.	Henry A. Foster (D)	Seated December 9, 1844
New York (3)	Henry A. Foster (D)	Appointee was not nominated for election. Successor elected January 18, 1845.	John A. Dix (D)	Seated January 27, 1845
South Carolina (2)	Daniel E. Huger (D)	Resigned March 3, 1845	Vacant	Not filled this term
Florida (1)	New state: Florida admitted to the Union March 3, 1845. First Senator wasn't elected until the next Congress.		Vacant	Not filled this term
Florida (2)	New state: Florida admitted to the Union March 3, 1845. First Senator wasn't elected until the next Congress.		Vacant	Not filled this term

=== House of Representatives ===
- Replacements: 14
  - Democrats (D): 6 seat net loss
  - Whigs (W): 6 seat net gain
- Deaths: 7
- Resignations: 7
- Contested election: 0
- Total seats with changes: 16

House changes
District	Vacated by	Reason for change	Successor	Date of successor's formal installation
Massachusetts 10th	Barker Burnell (W)	Died June 15, 1843	Joseph Grinnell (W)	Seated December 7, 1843
Georgia At-large	Mark A. Cooper (D)	Resigned June 26, 1843, to become candidate for Governor of Georgia	Alexander H. Stephens (W)	Seated October 2, 1843
Georgia At-large	John B. Lamar (D)	Resigned July 29, 1843	Absalom H. Chappell (W)	Seated October 2, 1843
Georgia At-large	John Millen (D)	Died October 15, 1843	Duncan L. Clinch (W)	Seated February 15, 1844
Virginia 7th	Henry A. Wise (D)	Resigned February 12, 1844, after being appointed Minister to Brazil	Thomas H. Bayly (D)	Seated May 6, 1844
Pennsylvania 21st	William Wilkens (D)	Resigned February 14, 1844, after being appointed United States Secretary of War	Cornelius Darragh (W)	Seated March 26, 1844
Virginia 5th	Thomas W. Gilmer (D)	Resigned February 16, 1844, after being appointed United States Secretary of the Navy	William L. Goggin (W)	Seated April 25, 1844
Pennsylvania 13th	Henry Frick (W)	Died March 1, 1844	James Pollock (W)	Seated April 5, 1844
Ohio 10th	Heman A. Moore (D)	Died April 3, 1844	Alfred P. Stone (D)	Seated October 8, 1844
Alabama 3rd	Dixon H. Lewis (D)	Resigned April 22, 1844, after being appointed US Senator	William L. Yancey (D)	Seated December 2, 1844
Louisiana 4th	Pierre Bossier (D)	Died April 24, 1844	Isaac E. Morse (D)	Seated December 2, 1844
New York 20th	Samuel Beardsley (D)	Resigned February 29, 1844, after being appointed associate judge of New York Supreme Court	Levi D. Carpenter (D)	Seated November 5, 1844
Ohio 21st	Henry R. Brinkerhoff (D)	Died April 30, 1844	Edward S. Hamlin (W)	Seated October 8, 1844
Pennsylvania 12th	Almon H. Read (D)	Died June 3, 1844	George Fuller (D)	Seated December 2, 1844
Florida Territory at-large	David L. Yulee (D)	Seat was eliminated when Florida achieved statehood March 3, 1845		
Florida at-large	Florida was admitted to the Union on March 3, 1845		Vacant	Not filled this term

== Committees ==
Lists of committees and their party leaders.

=== Senate ===
Committee	Chairman
Foreign Relations	William S. Archer (W-VA)
Finance	George Evans (W-ME)
Commerce	Jabez W. Huntington (W-CT)
Manufactures	James F. Simmons (W-RI)
Agriculture	William Upham (W-VT)
Military Affairs	John J. Crittenden (W-KY)
Militia	Alexander Barrow (W-LA)
Naval Affairs	Richard H. Bayard (W-DE)
Public Lands	William Woodbridge (W-MI)
Private Land Claims	John Henderson (W-MS)
Indian Affairs	Albert S. White (W-IN)
Claims	Ephraim H. Foster (W-TN)
Revolutionary Claims	Spencer Jarnagin (W-TN)
Judiciary	John M. Berrien (W-GA)
Post Office and Post Roads	William D. Merrick (W-MD)
Roads and Canals	Augustus S. Porter (W-MI)
Pensions	Isaac C. Bates (W-MA)
District of Columbia	Jacob W. Miller (W-NJ)
Patents and the Patent Office	Samuel S. Phelps (W-VT)
Retrenchment	James T. Morehead (W-KY)
Public Buildings	William L. Dayton (W-NJ)
Audit and Control the Contingent Expenses of the Senate	Benjamin Tappan (W-OH)
Printing	James F. Simmons (W-RI)
Engrossed Bills	Benjamin Tappan (W-OH)

=== House of Representatives ===
Committee	Chairman
Elections	Lucius Elmer (D-NJ)
Ways and Means	James I. McKay (D-NC)
Claims	Joseph Vance (W-OH)
Commerce	Isaac E. Holmes (D-SC)
Public Lands	John W. Davis (D-IN)
Post Office and Post Roads	George W. Hopkins (D-VA)
District of Columbia	John Campbell (D-SC)
Judiciary	William Wilkins (D-PA), until February 14, 1844; Romulus M. Saunders (D-NC), from February 14, 1844
Revolutionary Claims	Richard D. Davis (D-NY)
Public Expenditures	James G. Clinton (D-NY)
Private Land Claims	Edward Cross (D-AR)
Manufacturers	Jacob Collamer (W-VT)
Agriculture	Edmund Deberry (D-NC)
Indian Affairs	Cave Johnson (D-TN)
Military Affairs	Hugh A. Haralson (D-GA)
Militia	Ezra Dean (D-OH)
Naval Affairs	Henry A. Wise (D-VA), until February 12, 1844; William Parmenter (D-MA), from February 12, 1844
Foreign Affairs	Charles J. Ingersoll (D-PA)
Territories	Aaron V. Brown (D-TN)
Revolutionary Pensions	George O. Rathbun (D-NY), until 1844; David L. Seymour (D-NY), from 1844
Invalid Pensions	Jacob Brinkerhoff (D-OH)
Roads and Canals	Robert D. Owen (D-IN)
Patents	Alexander Harper (D-OH)
Public Buildings and Grounds	Zadock Pratt (D-NY)
Revisals and Unfinished Business	Elisha R. Potter (LO-RI)
Expenditures in the Navy Department	Amasa Dana (D-NY)
Expenditures in the Post Office Department	Alexander Harper (W-OH)
Expenditures on the Public Buildings	Daniel P. King (W-MA)
Rules (select)	Henry A. Wise (D-VA) until February 12, 1844; John Quincy Adams (W-MA) from February 12, 1844

=== Joint committees ===
- Enrolled Bills
- The Library
- Smithsonian Bequest

== Employees ==
- Librarian of Congress: John Silva Meehan

=== Senate ===
- Chaplain: Septimus Tustin (Presbyterian)
- Secretary: Asbury Dickins
- Sergeant at Arms: Edward Dyer

=== House of Representatives ===
- Chaplain: Isaac S. Tinsley (Baptist), elected December 16, 1843
  - William M. Daily (Methodist), from December 4, 1844
- Clerk: Matthew St. Clair Clarke, until December 7, 1843
  - Caleb J. McNulty, elected December 7, 1843
  - Benjamin B. French, elected January 18, 1845
- Doorkeeper: Jesse E. Dow, elected December 7, 1843
- Postmaster: William J. McCormick, until January 4, 1844
  - John M. Johnson, from January 4, 1844
- Sergeant at Arms: Eleazor M. Townsend, until December 8, 1843
  - Newton Lane, from December 8, 1843

== See also ==
- 1842 United States elections (elections leading to this Congress)
  - 1842–43 United States Senate elections
  - 1842–43 United States House of Representatives elections
- 1844 United States elections (elections during this Congress, leading to the next Congress)
  - 1844 United States presidential election
  - 1844–45 United States Senate elections
  - 1844–45 United States House of Representatives elections
