= Timothy Jenkins =

American politician

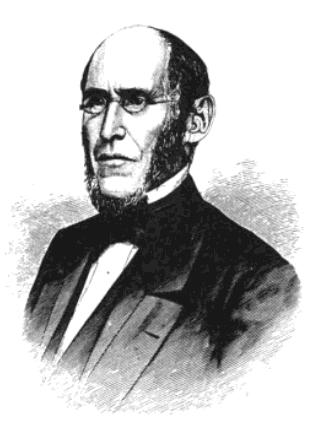

Member of the U.S. House of Representatives from New York's 20th district
- In office March 4, 1845 – March 3, 1849
- Preceded by: Levi D. Carpenter
- Succeeded by: Orsamus B. Matteson
- In office March 4, 1851 – March 3, 1853
- Preceded by: Orsamus B. Matteson
- Succeeded by: Orsamus B. Matteson

Personal details
- Born: January 29, 1799 Barre, Massachusetts, U.S.
- Died: December 24, 1859 (aged 60) Martinsburg, New York, U.S.
- Resting place: City Cemetery, Oneida Castle, New York, U.S.
- Party: Democratic (to 1854); Republican (after 1854)

Timothy Jenkins (January 29, 1799 – December 24, 1859) was an American lawyer and politician who served as a U.S. representative from New York, serving three terms during the mid-19th century.

== Biography ==
Timothy Jenkins was born in Barre, Massachusetts on January 29, 1799. His father died when he was 16, and Jenkins moved to Washington County, New York in 1817. He attended academies in Salem and White Creek, and then taught school while studying law with Samuel Beardsley and William H. Maynard in Utica and Lauren Ford in Herkimer. Jenkins was admitted to the bar in 1824.

=== Legal career ===
He resided in Vernon and Oneida Castle, where he continued to practice law. Among the attorneys who studied under Jenkins was Breese J. Stevens. In Vernon he served in local office, including clerk of the village board of trustees. In Oneida Castle he served in local office including postmaster and fire warden.

Jenkins was the attorney for the Oneida Indians from 1838 to 1845 as they negotiated with the state of New York to resolve land claims and create reservations. He served as district attorney for Oneida County from 1840 to 1845.

=== Congress ===
Jenkins was elected as a Democrat to the Twenty-ninth and Thirtieth Congresses (March 4, 1845 – March 3, 1849). He was an unsuccessful candidate for reelection in 1848 to the Thirty-first Congress. Jenkins was elected to the Thirty-second Congress (March 4, 1851 – March 3, 1853), and served as chairman of the Committee on Private Land Claims. He was an unsuccessful candidate for reelection in 1852 to the Thirty-third Congress.

During his time in Congress, Jenkins was identified as a prominent opponent of slavery, including support for the Wilmot Proviso and opposition to the Kansas–Nebraska Act. According to some accounts, he was the Wilmot Proviso's actual author.

As a result of his anti-slavery views Jenkins became a Republican when the party was founded. In 1856 he served as delegate to the first Republican National Convention. In 1857 he was the unsuccessful Republican nominee for a seat on the New York Court of Appeals, losing to Hiram Denio. In 1858 he was a candidate for the Republican nomination for Governor of New York, and lost to Edwin D. Morgan, who went on to win the general election.

=== Death ===
Jenkins died in on December 24, 1859, while attending a session of the New York Supreme Court in Martinsburg. He was interred at City Cemetery in Oneida Castle.

== Family ==
In 1822 Jenkins married Florilla Tuttle of Vernon. She died soon afterwards, and in 1829 he married Harriet Tuttle, a sister of his first wife. With his second wife Jenkins was the father of four children: Charles M. Jenkins (1830–1856), an attorney; Hiram T. Jenkins (1833–1868), an attorney; Florilla Jenkins (1838–1919), the wife of W. Jerome Hickox; and Albert Jenkins, who died in infancy.

== Legacy ==
Jenkins accumulated a large collection of books and papers, including legal and historical works, speeches, and government publications. In the 1910s his daughter donated the collection to Hamilton College.

A collection of Jenkins' letters, many concerning his antislavery efforts, were donated to the New York State Library.

U.S. House of Representatives
Preceded by Levi D. Carpenter	Member of the U.S. House of Representatives from New York's 20th congressional district March 4, 1845 – March 3, 1849	Succeeded by Orsamus B. Matteson
Preceded by Orsamus B. Matteson	Member of the U.S. House of Representatives from New York's 20th congressional district March 4, 1851 – March 3, 1853	Succeeded by Orsamus B. Matteson
