= Presidential Election Day Act =

- Long title: An Act to establish a uniform time for holding elections for electors of President and Vice President in all the States of the Union
- Enacted by: the 28th United States Congress
- Effective: January 23, 1845

Citations
- Statutes at Large: 5 Stat. 721

Codification
- Acts amended: Presidential Election and Succession Act of 1792

Legislative history
- Introduced in the House; Signed into law by President John Tyler on January 23, 1845

On January 23, 1845, the 28th US Congress passed "An act to establish a uniform time for holding elections for electors of President and Vice President in all the States of the Union." The act selected "the Tuesday after the first Monday in November" as the day on which all states must appoint electors. However, if a state fails to appoint electors by that day, then "the electors may be appointed on a subsequent day in such manner as the State shall by law provide." This standardization greatly increased the speed of Presidential elections; the previous election of 1844 lasted from November 1-December 4. From 1848 onward, every Presidential election has been held on this date.
