= Daniel Elliott Huger House =

House in South Carolina

Coordinates: 32.772808°N 79.930202°W

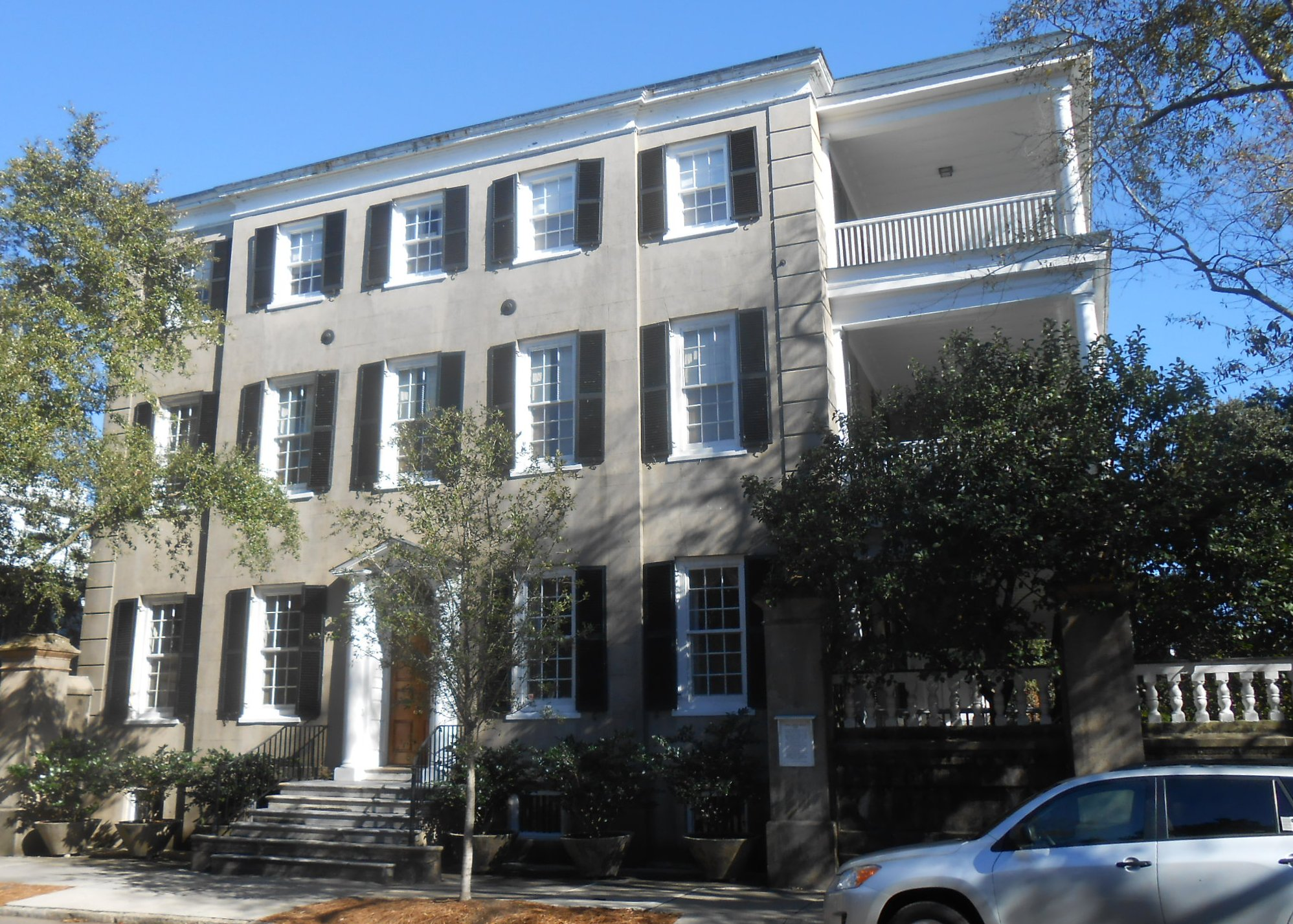
The Daniel Elliott Huger House is located at 34 Meeting Street, Charleston, South Carolina.

The Daniel Elliott Huger House was the last home of a Royal governor in South Carolina.

John Bull bought the property in 1759 from the estate of George Eveleigh. Eveleigh had built a house at 39 Church Street on the large lot that had originally run from Church Street through the block to Meeting Street. The land later passed through the hands of Bull's widow and then to his granddaughters. Historians have been unable to determine which owner was responsible for building the house, but it was probably built around 1760.

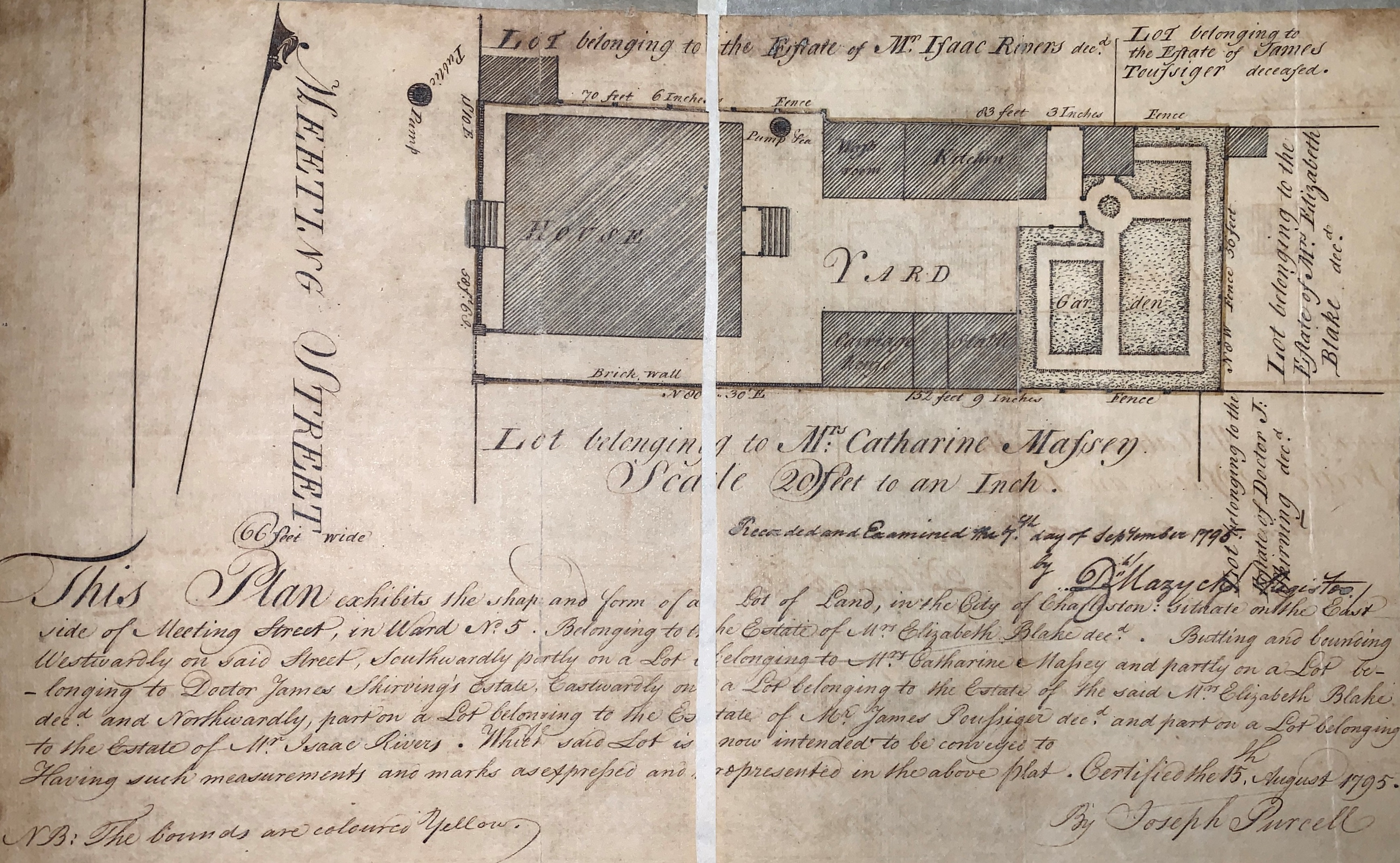
Daniel Elliott House at 34 Meeting Street, Charleston, South Carolina as seen in a 1795 plat

The large double house (i.e., four rooms per floor with a central stair hall) is three stories tall and sits on a high foundation. The exterior has a stucco finish that might have been added following the earthquake of 1886. The three-story piazzas on the south side were added in the 20th century.

Lord and Lady William Campbell, the former Sarah Izard, were married in 1763. In 1775, they were residing in a house owned by Mrs. Blake, first cousin of Lady Campbell. During the tumultuous times before the start of the American Revolution, Lord Campbell abandoned both his governmental duties and Lady Campbell. He fled via boat on the Vanderhorst Creek (which still ran near the back edge of the lot along what is today Water Street) to the British Man-of-war H.M.S. Tamar. Thus ended the Royal governance of South Carolina.

Mrs. Blake's executors sold the house to Col. Lewis Morris in 1795, who then sold it to his nephew-in-law Daniel Elliott Huger in 1818.

The common name for the house was assumed when Daniel Elliott Huger bought the house in 1818.

== See also ==
- Ralph Izard
- Lewis Morris
