= Orsamus B. Matteson =

American politician and lawyer (1805–1889)

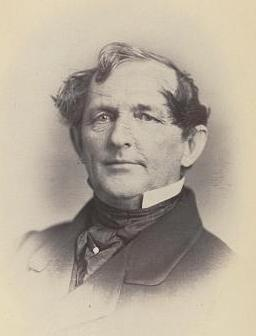

Member of the U.S. House of Representatives from New York's 20th district
- In office March 4, 1849 – March 3, 1851
- Preceded by: Timothy Jenkins
- Succeeded by: Timothy Jenkins
- In office March 4, 1853 – February 27, 1857
- Preceded by: Timothy Jenkins
- Succeeded by: Vacant
- In office March 4, 1857 – March 3, 1859
- Preceded by: Vacant
- Succeeded by: Roscoe Conkling

Personal details
- Born: Orsamus Benajah Matteson; August 28, 1805 Verona, New York, U.S.
- Died: December 22, 1889 (aged 84) Utica, New York, U.S.
- Resting place: Forest Hill Cemetery; Utica, New York, U.S.
- Party: Whig; Republican
- Spouse: Mary Hurlburt (m. 1830)
- Children: 2
- Occupation: Politician; lawyer

Orsamus Benajah Matteson (August 28, 1805 – December 22, 1889) was a U.S. representative from New York.

== Early life ==
Orsamus Benajah Matteson was born on August 28, 1805, in a log cabin in Verona, New York. He was one of eleven children. He attended the common schools and studied law in Utica, New York, alongside Horatio Seymour and was admitted to the bar in 1830.

== Career ==
Matteson commenced practice in Utica. He had law practices with William J. Bacon, P. Sheldon Root and Charles A. Doolittle. He served as the first city attorney of Utica in 1834 and 1836. He also served as state supreme court commissioner. He was an unsuccessful candidate for election in 1846 to the Thirtieth Congress.

=== Congress ===
Matteson was elected as a Whig to the Thirty-first Congress (March 4, 1849 – March 3, 1851). He was an unsuccessful candidate for reelection in 1850 to the Thirty-second Congress. Matteson was elected to the Thirty-third Congress and began service on March 4, 1853 where he served as chairman of the Committee on the District of Columbia. He was re-elected as a Whig in 1854.

=== Resignation ===
He resigned on February 27, 1857, just before a recommendation of censure could be passed by the House for allegations of bribery and corruption concerning a Minnesota land bill. He was also accused of publicly stating that a majority of the US House was purchasable, which led to his decision to resign. Matteson was elected as a Republican to the Thirty-fifth Congress (March 4, 1857 – March 3, 1859).

He was interested in a scheme for the construction of the St. Mary's Ship Canal and he engaged in lumbering and iron manufacturing and in the acquisition of large tracts of land. Matteson engaged in different business enterprises later in life and would die comparatively poor.

== Personal life ==
Matteson married Mary Hurlburt of Utica in 1830. They had two children, Henry Clay and a daughter who married Colonel George Pomeroy of Utica.

Matteson was one of the congressman that got sick from the National Hotel disease in 1857.

=== Death and burial ===
Matteson died in Utica, New York, on December 22, 1889. He was interred in Forest Hill Cemetery in Utica.

== Sources ==
- United States Congress. "Orsamus B. Matteson (id: M000251)". Biographical Directory of the United States Congress.

U.S. House of Representatives
Preceded by Timothy Jenkins	Member of the U.S. House of Representatives from New York's 20th congressional district March 4, 1849 – March 3, 1851	Succeeded by Timothy Jenkins
Preceded by Timothy Jenkins	Member of the U.S. House of Representatives from New York's 20th congressional district March 4, 1853 – February 27, 1857	Succeeded by Vacant
Preceded by Vacant	Member of the U.S. House of Representatives from New York's 20th congressional district March 4, 1857 – March 3, 1859	Succeeded by Roscoe Conkling
