= Samuel Gordon (New York politician) =

American politician

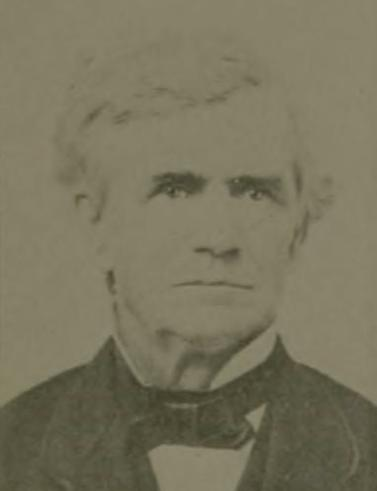

Member of the U.S. House of Representatives from New York's 10th district
- In office March 4, 1841 – March 3, 1843
- Preceded by: Jeremiah Russell
- Succeeded by: Eliakim Sherrill

Personal details
- Born: April 28, 1802 Wattle's Ferry, U.S.
- Died: October 28, 1873 (aged 71) Delhi, New York
- Resting place: Woodland Cemetery, NY
- Party: Democratic

Samuel Gordon (April 28, 1802 – October 28, 1873) was an American lawyer and politician who served as a United States representative from New York, serving two non-consecutive terms from 1841 to 1843, and from 1845 to 1847.

== Biography ==
Gordon was born at Wattle's Ferry on April 28, 1802. He attended public schools and became a farmer. He later studied law, was admitted to the bar and commenced practice in Delhi, New York.

=== Early political career ===
Gordon was appointed postmaster of Delhi on September 14, 1831, and held that position until August 16, 1841. He was a member of the New York State Assembly, as district attorney of Delaware County and was town supervisor of the town of Delhi for several terms.

=== Congress ===
In 1840, Gordon was elected as a Democrat to represent New York's 20th District in the 27th Congress (March 4, 1841 – March 3, 1843). In 1844, he was elected to represent New York's 10th District in the 29th Congress (March 4, 1845 – March 3, 1847).

=== Later career and death ===
After leaving Congress, Gordon resumed the practice of law. During the American Civil War he was appointed provost marshal for the nineteenth district of New York.

He died in Delhi on October 28, 1873, with interment in Woodland Cemetery.

U.S. House of Representatives
Preceded by Judson Allen	Member of the U.S. House of Representatives from New York's 20th congressional district March 4, 1841 – March 3, 1843	Succeeded by Samuel Beardsley
Preceded by Jeremiah Russell	Member of the U.S. House of Representatives from New York's 10th congressional district March 4, 1845 – March 3, 1847	Succeeded by Eliakim Sherrill
