= Judson Allen =

American businessman and politician (1797–1880)

Member of the U.S. House of Representatives from New York's 20th district
- In office March 4, 1839 – March 3, 1841
- Preceded by: Amasa J. Parker
- Succeeded by: Samuel Gordon

Member of the New York State Assembly from the Broome County district
- In office January 1, 1836 – December 31, 1837
- Preceded by: Neri Blatchly
- Succeeded by: James Stoddard

Personal details
- Born: April 3, 1797 Plymouth, Connecticut, U.S.
- Died: August 6, 1880 (aged 83) St. Louis, Missouri, U.S.
- Resting place: Bellefontaine Cemetery; St. Louis, Missouri, U.S.
- Citizenship: United States
- Party: Democratic Party
- Spouses: Roena Badger (m. 1825; died 1830) Sabra Badger (m. 1835)
- Profession: Politician; businessman; postmaster; judge

Judson Allen (April 3, 1797 – August 6, 1880) was a 19th-century American businessman and politician, who served one term as a member of the United States House of Representatives for New York's 20th district from 1839 to 1841.

== Early life ==
Judson Allen was born on April 3, 1797, in Plymouth, Connecticut. He attended public schools there.

== Career ==
Allen was engaged in the lumber industry in Plymouth, before he moved to Harpursville, New York. He was appointed Harpursville postmaster from 1830 to 1839. He then served as a judge in the Broome County, New York court for 8 years and as a member of the New York State Assembly from 1836 to 1837.

=== Congress ===
In 1839, Allen was elected on the Democratic ticket to the United States House of Representatives for the twentieth district of New York for the twenty-sixth United States Congress. He served from March 4, 1839 to March 3, 1841.

=== Later career ===
Upon leaving the Congress, Allen moved to Saint Louis, Missouri, where he was actively involved in the produce, lumber, marble, and grocery fields.

== Personal life ==
Allen married Roena Badger, daughter of Lemuel Badger and Sabra Smith, in 1825. Roena died on December 2, 1830, and he married her sister, Sabra Badger, on 4 June 1835.

=== Death and burial ===
Allen died in St. Louis, Missouri, on August 6, 1880. He is buried at Bellefontaine Cemetery, St. Louis, Missouri.

New York State Assembly
Preceded by Neri Blatchly	New York State Assembly; Broome County; 1836–1837	Succeeded by James Stoddard
U.S. House of Representatives
Preceded by Amasa J. Parker	Member of the U.S. House of Representatives from New York's 20th congressional district March 4, 1839 – March 3, 1841	Succeeded by Samuel Gordon
