= Norton Strange Townshend =

American politician

Norton S. Townshend
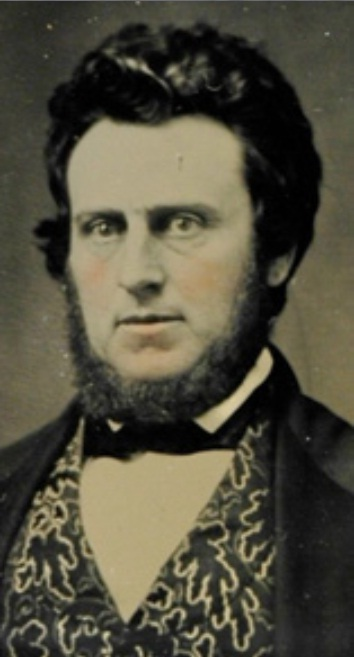

Member of the U.S. House of Representatives from Ohio's 21st district
- In office March 4, 1851 – March 3, 1853
- Preceded by: Joseph M. Root
- Succeeded by: Andrew Stuart

Member of the Ohio House of Representatives from the Lorain County district
- In office December 4, 1848 – December 2, 1849
- Preceded by: Elah Park
- Succeeded by: Joseph L. Whiton

Member of the Ohio Senate from the 27th district
- In office January 2, 1854 – January 6, 1856
- Preceded by: Aaron Pardee
- Succeeded by: Herman Canfield

Personal details
- Born: Norton Strange Townshend; December 25, 1815 Clay Coton, Northamptonshire, England, U.K.
- Died: July 13, 1895 (aged 79) Columbus, Ohio, U.S.
- Resting place: Protestant Cemetery, Avon, Ohio
- Party: Democratic
- Education: Columbia University College of Physicians and Surgeons

Norton Strange Townshend (December 25, 1815 – July 13, 1895) was a 19th-century American physician and politician who served one term as a United States representative from Ohio from 1851 to 1853.

== Biography ==
Born in Clay Coton, Northamptonshire, England, in 1830 he migrated to the United States with his parents, who settled in Avon, Ohio. He educated himself by the use of his father's library, taught a district school for a short time, and was graduated from the Columbia University College of Physicians and Surgeons in New York in 1840.

=== Early career ===
Townshend was a delegate to the World's Anti-Slavery Convention in London in 1840, but he was not included in the commemorative painting with other important delegates. He studied medicine in the hospitals of London, Paris, Edinburgh, and Dublin, and in 1841 engaged in the practice of medicine in Avon, Ohio.

He moved to Elyria, Ohio and was a member of the Ohio House of Representatives in 1848 and 1849.

=== Congress ===
He was a delegate to the State constitutional convention in 1850 and was elected as a Democrat to the Thirty-second Congress (March 4, 1851 – March 3, 1853).

=== Later career ===
In 1854 and 1855 Townshend was a member of the Ohio Senate and during the American Civil War was a medical inspector of the Union Army with the rank of lieutenant colonel from 1863 to 1865.

He engaged in agricultural pursuits near Avon, was director of the State board of agriculture from 1858 to 1869 and 1886 to 1889, was professor of agriculture in Iowa Agricultural College in 1869, and was appointed in 1870 as one of the first trustees of Ohio Agricultural and Mechanical College. He resigned in 1873 to become professor of agriculture in the new State college and served until his resignation in 1892 when he became professor emeritus.

=== Death and burial ===
Townshend died in Columbus, Ohio in 1895. His interment was in Protestant Cemetery, Avon, Ohio.

=== Papers and legacy ===
The Norton Strange Townshend Family Papers are located at the William L. Clements Library in Ann Arbor, Michigan.

Townshend Hall on the campus of Ohio State University was named for the professor on May 19, 1896.

His descendants include his great-grandson Norton Townshend Dodge, an economist and art collector.

U.S. House of Representatives
Preceded by Joseph M. Root	Member of the U.S. House of Representatives from Ohio's 21st congressional district 1851-1853	Succeeded by Andrew Stuart
