= Pierre Bossier Mall =

- Location: Bossier City, Louisiana, United States
- Coordinates: 32.5258°N 93.7056°W
- Opened: August 19, 1982; 44 years ago
- Developer: General Growth Properties
- Manager: Kohan Retail Investment Group
- Owner: Kohan Retail Investment Group
- Num. of stores: 80
- Num. of anchor tenants: 5 (4 open, 1 vacant)
- Floor area: 650,000 sq ft (60,000 m^{2})
- Floors: 1 (2 in Dillard's)
- Parking: 4,000
- Website: pierrebossiermall.com

Pierre Bossier Mall is an enclosed shopping mall located at the intersection of Interstate 20 and Airline Drive (Louisiana Highway 3105) in Bossier City, Louisiana, United States. The mall, as is the city in which it is located, is named after early settler Pierre Bossier. In October 1998, the mall was purchased by General Growth Properties, which built and sold it in the 1980s, for $26 million. It is currently managed by The Woodmont Company. Its anchor stores are J. C. Penney, Dillard's, Surge Entertainment by Drew Brees, and Forever 21, formerly Stage, established with the sale in 1994 by Horace Ladymon of the Beall-Ladymon Corporation. The mall had a theater, The Bossier 6. It was opened September 10, 1982 and was operated by AMC. It closed in 2000.

The mall banned smoking on June 1, 1994.

In 2005, Shreveport newspaper The Times reported that Pierre Bossier Mall was one of two local malls to increase sales, bucking the national trends toward the decline of traditional enclosed malls. The mall faced increased competition from newer outdoor shopping centers such as the Louisiana Boardwalk but the hot, humid Louisiana summers helped to drive shoppers to the air conditioned indoor mall. In mid-2012, Virginia College moved into an anchor spot vacated by Service Merchandise in 1999.

On June 6, 2018, it was announced that Sears would be closing in September 2018.

On June 1, 2019, Virginia College closed and the space sat vacant until May 2022, when Surge Entertainment by Drew Brees opened in the former space.
