= Andrew Stuart (Ohio politician) =

American journalist

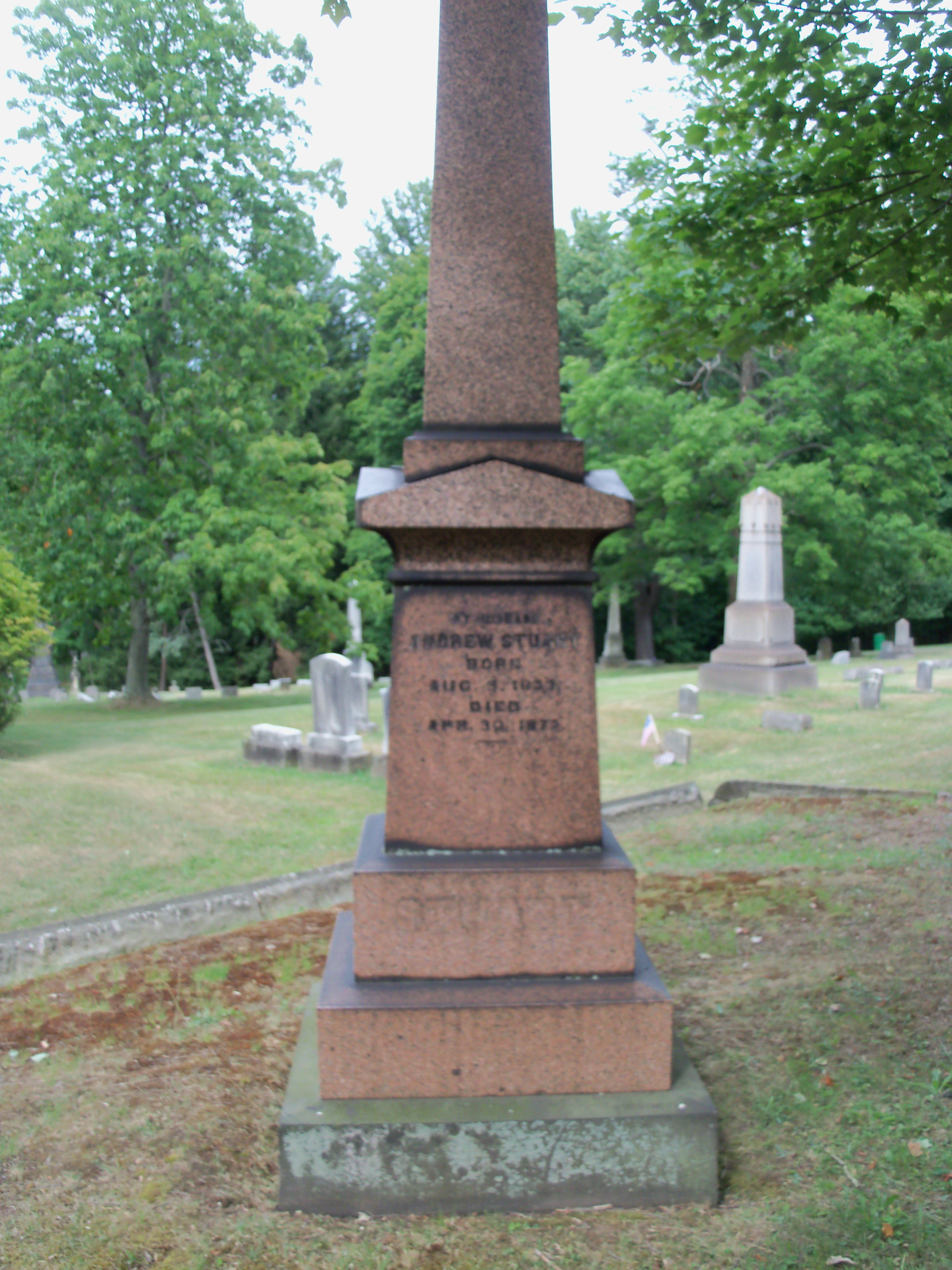
- Tombstone

Member of the U.S. House of Representatives from Ohio's 21st district
- In office March 4, 1853 – March 3, 1855
- Preceded by: Norton Strange Townshend
- Succeeded by: John Bingham

Personal details
- Born: August 3, 1823 Pittsburgh, Pennsylvania, US
- Died: April 30, 1872 (aged 48) Washington, D.C., US
- Resting place: Union Cemetery, Steubenville, Ohio
- Party: Democratic

Andrew Stuart (August 3, 1823 – April 30, 1872) was a U.S. representative from Ohio.

Born near Pittsburgh, Pennsylvania, Stuart moved to Pittsburgh with his mother in 1834. He received limited schooling. He worked in a newspaper office. He moved to Steubenville, Ohio, in 1850, where he was editor of the American Union 1850-1857.

Stuart was elected as a Democrat to the Thirty-third Congress (March 4, 1853 – March 3, 1855). He was an unsuccessful candidate for reelection. He engaged in the shipping business on the Gulf of Mexico and in the transportation of mails and supplies from Leavenworth, Kansas, to Santa Fe, New Mexico. He resided in Washington, D.C., from 1869 until his death, April 30, 1872. He was interred in Union Cemetery, Steubenville, Ohio.

== Sources ==
- United States Congress. "Andrew Stuart (id: S001031)". Biographical Directory of the United States Congress.

U.S. House of Representatives
Preceded by Norton Strange Townshend	Member of the U.S. House of Representatives from Ohio's 21st congressional district 1853-1855	Succeeded by John Bingham
