= Edwin Warren Moïse =

American judge

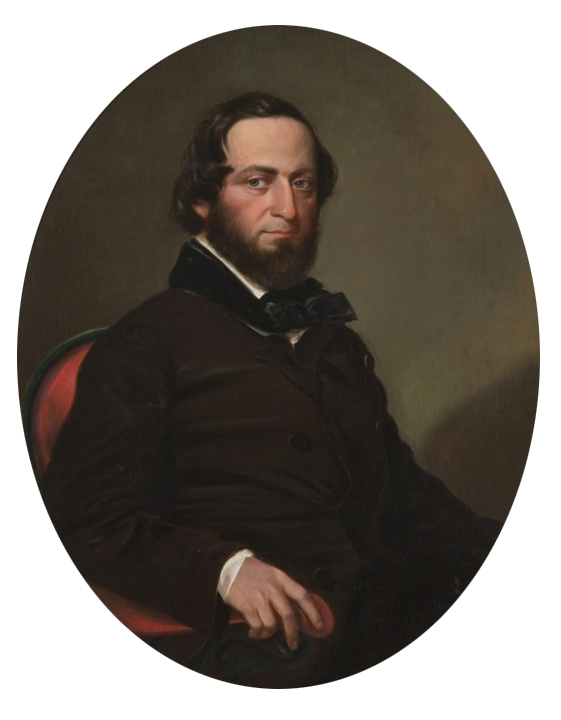
- painted by his brother, Theodore Sidney Moïse
- Born: January 2, 1810; Charleston, South Carolina, U.S.
- Died: June 29, 1868 (aged 58); Jefferson, Louisiana, U.S.
- Resting place: Lafayette Cemetery, New Orleans, Louisiana
- Spouse(s): Priscilla (Lopez) Moïse; Louise (Hubert) Moïse (1827–1875)
- Children: 8

Edwin Warren Moïse (1810–1868) was an American medical doctor, lawyer, Speaker of the Louisiana House, Attorney General of Louisiana, and District Court Judge.

== Early life ==
Edwin Warren Moïse was born on January 2, 1810, in Charleston, South Carolina. His father was Hyam Moïse (1785–1811) native of Saint-Domingue (now Haiti) and his mother, Cecelia Francis (Woolf) Moïse (1789–1871). He grew up in Charleston, and attended Congregation Kahal Kadosh Beth Elohim with his family. He was trained as a physician at the Charleston Medical College.

== Career ==
Moïse worked as a physician in Woodville, Mississippi, an affluent town thanks to the cotton industry. In 1840, he moved to New Orleans, Louisiana to become a lawyer. He was elected to the Louisiana House of Representatives and served as Speaker of the House. He then served as United States Attorney. Under Governor Robert C. Wickliffe (1819–1895), who served as the 15th Governor of Louisiana from 1856 to 1860, he served as Attorney General of Louisiana.

During the American Civil War of 1861–1865, Moïse served as the District Court Judge for Louisiana. He was a secessionist, supported slavery cause and subscribed to the ideas of John C. Calhoun (1782–1850).

== Personal life ==
Moïse was married twice. His first wife was Priscilla (Lopez) Moïse (1807–1839), the daughter of David Lopez (1750–1811) and Priscilla Lopez (1775–1856) and granddaughter of slave trader Aaron Lopez (1731–1782). They had two daughters and one son:

- Cecilia Woodville Moïse (1836–1921).
- Theodore Lopez Moïse (1839–1839). He died a few days after was born.
- Sallie Lopez Moïse (1839–1924). Her mother died four days after her birth.

His second wife was Louise (Hubert) Moïse (1827–1875), the daughter of William de St. Hubert (1781–1847) and Rose Emilie (De La Chenaye) Hubert (1796–1863), whose maternal grandfather owned a large sugar plantation in Saint-Domingue. They had four sons and one daughter:

- Louise Moïse (1854–1856).
- Marie Aline Moïse Conrad (1857–1906). She married George Mather Conrad, and they had six children.
- Harry Moïse (1861–1912). He married Josephine Julia (Hereford) (1862–1941), and they had four children.
- Theodore Sidney Moïse (1862–1915). He married Mary Louise (Gaston) Moïse (1865–1936), the daughter of Dr John Brown Gaston (1834–1913) who served as the mayor of Montgomery, Alabama from 1881 to 1885, and they had five children. He worked as Superintendent of the Georgia Central Railway.
- Warren Hubert Moïse (1864–1939). He married Laura Mason (1876–1922), and he worked as a stock broker in San Francisco, California.

== Death ==
Moïse died on June 29, 1868, in Jefferson, Louisiana. He was buried in the Lafayette Cemetery in New Orleans.
