= Levi D. Carpenter =

American politician

Member of the U.S. House of Representatives from New York's 20th district
- In office November 5, 1844 – March 3, 1845
- Preceded by: Samuel Beardsley
- Succeeded by: Timothy Jenkins

Personal details
- Born: August 21, 1802 Waterville, New York, U.S.
- Died: October 27, 1856 (aged 54) Waterville, New York, U.S.
- Party: Democratic

Levi D. Carpenter (August 21, 1802 – October 27, 1856) was an American lawyer and politician who served briefly as a United States representative from New York from 1844 to 1845.

== Biography ==
Carpenter was born in Waterville, New York on August 21, 1802, where he attended the public schools and studied law. He was admitted to the bar and commenced practice in Waterville, New York. He was supervisor of the town of Sangerfield, New York in 1835.

=== Congress ===
Carpenter was elected as a Democrat to the 28th United States Congress to fill the vacancy caused by the resignation of Samuel Beardsley and served from November 5, 1844, to March 3, 1845. He was not a candidate for reelection in 1844 to the 29th United States Congress.

=== Later career and death ===
He resumed the practice of law in Waterville, New York and died there on October 27, 1856, and is interred in the City Cemetery.

U.S. House of Representatives
Preceded by Samuel Beardsley	Member of the U.S. House of Representatives from New York's 20th congressional district 1844–1845	Succeeded by Timothy Jenkins
