= Henry R. Brinkerhoff =

American politician

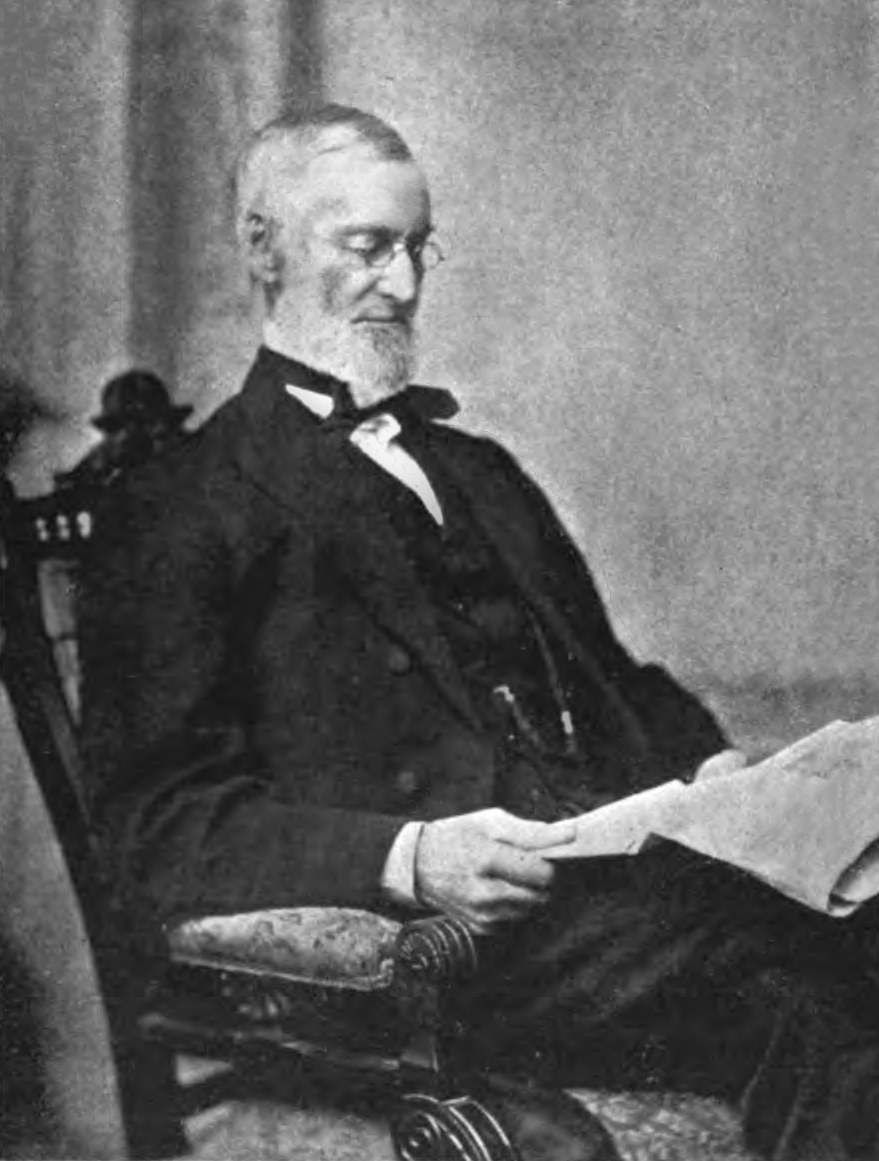

Member of the U.S. House of Representatives from Ohio's 21st district
- In office March 4, 1843 – April 30, 1844
- Preceded by: New District
- Succeeded by: Edward S. Hamlin

Personal details
- Born: Henry Roelif Brinkerhoff; September 23, 1787 Adams County, Pennsylvania
- Died: April 30, 1844 (aged 56) Huron County, Ohio
- Party: Democratic

Henry Roelif Brinkerhoff (September 23, 1787 – April 30, 1844) was an American veteran of the War of 1812 who served as a U.S. representative from Ohio, serving part of one term in office before his death in 1844.

He was a cousin of Jacob Brinkerhoff.

== Biography ==
Born in Adams County, Pennsylvania, Brinkerhoff moved with his parents to Cayuga County, New York, in 1793. He attended the country schools.

=== War of 1812 ===
He commanded a company of militia in the War of 1812, distinguishing himself in the Battle of Queenstown Heights. He engaged in agricultural pursuits.

=== Career ===
He served as member of the State assembly in 1828 and 1829. Senior major general of the New York State Militia in 1824. Commanded the military escort which accompanied General Lafayette in his progress through the State. He moved to Huron County, Ohio, in 1837.

=== Congress and death ===
Brinkerhoff was elected as a Democrat to the Twenty-eighth Congress and served from March 4, 1843, until his death in Huron County, Ohio, April 30, 1844.

He was interred in the Pioneer Cemetery, Plymouth, Ohio.

== See also ==
- List of members of the United States Congress who died in office (1790–1899)

== Sources ==
- United States Congress. "Henry R. Brinkerhoff (id: B000837)". Biographical Directory of the United States Congress.

U.S. House of Representatives
Preceded by New district	Member of the U.S. House of Representatives from Ohio's 21st congressional district 1843-1844	Succeeded by Edward S. Hamlin
