= Edward S. Hamlin =

American politician

Member of the U.S. House of Representatives from Ohio's 21st district
- In office October 8, 1844 – March 3, 1845
- Preceded by: Henry R. Brinkerhoff
- Succeeded by: Joseph M. Root

Personal details
- Born: Edward Stowe Hamlin; July 6, 1808 Hillsdale, New York, US
- Died: November 23, 1894 (aged 86) Washington, D.C., US
- Resting place: Cedar Grove Cemetery, Williamsburg, Virginia
- Party: Whig

Edward Stowe Hamlin (July 6, 1808 – November 23, 1894) was a 19th-century lawyer and politician who served briefly as a U.S. representative from Ohio from late 1844 to early 1845.

== Life and career ==
Born in Hillsdale, New York, Hamlin attended the district school of Hillsdale, New York, and a private school in Stockbridge, Massachusetts.

=== Legal career ===
He pursued an academic course in Hudson, New York. He subsequently studied law and was admitted to the bar in 1831 and commenced practice in Elyria, Ohio. He served as prosecuting attorney of Lorain County from 1833–1835.

=== Congress ===
Hamlin was elected as a Whig to the Twenty-eighth Congress to fill the vacancy caused by the death of Henry R. Brinkerhoff and served from October 8, 1844, to March 3, 1845.

He was not a candidate for renomination in 1844.

=== Later career ===
He then moved to Cleveland, Ohio, in 1844 and engaged in the newspaper business, establishing the True Democrat (now The Plain Dealer) in 1846.

He served as member of the Free Soil Convention at Buffalo in 1848. He served as president of the board of public works from 1849 to 1852.

He moved to Cincinnati, Ohio, in 1856, and was the attorney for the Cincinnati, Indianapolis & Lafayette Railroad for many years.

He moved to Williamsburg, Virginia, in 1884 to supervise his extensive land holdings at Newport News.

=== Death and burial ===
He died in Washington, D.C., November 23, 1894 and was interred in Cedar Grove Cemetery in Williamsburg.

U.S. House of Representatives
Preceded by Henry R. Brinkerhoff	Member of the U.S. House of Representatives from Ohio's 21st congressional district 1844–1845	Succeeded by Joseph M. Root
