= Isaac E. Morse =

American politician

Isaac Edward Morse

United States Congressman
- In office December 2, 1844 – March 3, 1851
- Preceded by: Pierre Bossier
- Succeeded by: John Moore

Attorney General of Louisiana
- In office 1854–1856
- Preceded by: Isaac Johnson
- Succeeded by: E. Warren Moise

Personal details
- Born: May 22, 1809 Attakapas, Louisiana
- Died: February 11, 1866 (aged 56) New Orleans, Louisiana, U.S.
- Party: Democratic
- Education: Norwich Military Academy, Harvard University
- Alma mater: Harvard University
- Occupation: Attorney, Politician
- Profession: Lawyer
- Committees: Committee on Private Land Claims (Thirty-first Congress)

Isaac Edward Morse (May 22, 1809 – February 11, 1866) was an attorney and slaveholder who served as United States Congressman from Louisiana and Attorney General of Louisiana. He was born in Attakapas, Louisiana.

== Biography ==
Morse attended school in Elizabethtown, New Jersey, and the Norwich Military Academy in Norwich, Vermont. He graduated from Harvard University in 1829. He studied law and was admitted to the bar and practiced in New Orleans, Louisiana, and St. Martinville, Louisiana, from 1835 to 1842. In 1842, he was elected to the Louisiana State Senate, serving through 1844. He was then elected to the United States Congress as a Democrat to fill the vacancy created by the death of Peter E. Bossier. He was reelected to the Twenty-ninth, Thirtieth, and Thirty-first Congresses and served from December 2, 1844, to March 3, 1851. He was the chairman, Committee on Private Land Claims during the Thirty-first Congress. He also served as a delegate to the 1848 Democratic National Convention. In 1850, he was an unsuccessful candidate for reelection, defeated by John Moore (Whig).

In 1854, he became the attorney general of Louisiana, serving in that capacity through 1856. He was appointed by President Franklin Pierce on December 2, 1856, as one of two special commissioners to New Granada to negotiate concerning the transit of citizens, officers, soldiers, and seamen of the United States across the Isthmus of Panama. He died in New Orleans, Louisiana, on February 11, 1866. He is buried in Washington Cemetery.

U.S. House of Representatives
Preceded by Pierre Bossier	United States Representative for the 4th Congressional District of Louisiana; 1844—1851	Succeeded by John Moore
Legal offices
Preceded by Isaac Johnson	Attorney General of Louisiana; 1854–1856	Succeeded by E. Warren Moise
