= Joseph M. Root =

American politician (1807–1879)

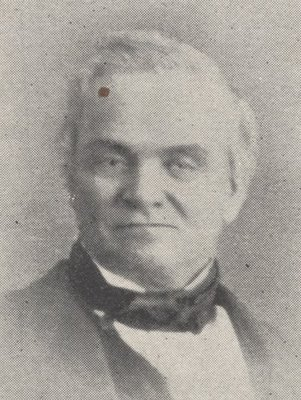

Member of the U.S. House of Representatives from Ohio's 21st district
- In office March 4, 1845 – March 3, 1851
- Preceded by: Edward S. Hamlin
- Succeeded by: Norton Strange Townshend

Member of the Ohio Senate from the Huron & Erie Counties district
- In office December 7, 1840 – December 4, 1842
- Preceded by: Josiah Tracy
- Succeeded by: John Fuller

Member of the Ohio Senate from the 30th district
- In office January 3, 1870 – December 31, 1871 Serving with Homer Everett
- Preceded by: Homer Everett
- Succeeded by: W. O. Parker

Personal details
- Born: Joseph Mosley Root; October 7, 1807 Brutus, New York
- Died: April 7, 1879 (aged 71) Sandusky, Ohio
- Resting place: Oakland Cemetery, Sandusky, Ohio
- Party: Whig
- Other political affiliations: Free Soil
- Spouse: Mary S. Buckingham
- Children: five daughters
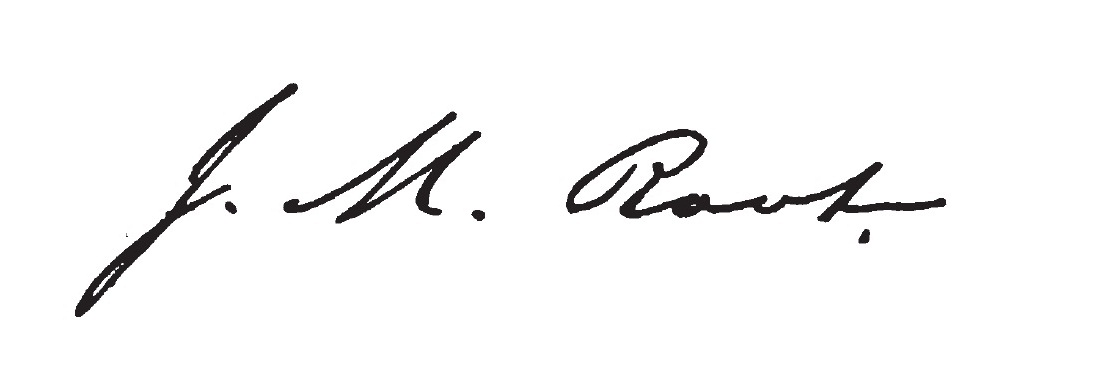
- Signature

Joseph Mosley Root (October 7, 1807 – April 7, 1879) was a U.S. representative from Ohio.

== Life and career ==
The son of Joseph Root III & Tryphena Mosley he was born October 7, 1807, in Brutus, New York. Root pursued classical studies and later studied law in Auburn, New York. He moved to Ohio in 1829, where he was admitted to the bar in 1830 and commenced practice in Norwalk.

In 1832-1833, Root was Mayor of Sandusky, Ohio. In 1835, Root married Mary S. Buckingham in Norwalk. They had five daughters. Root was elected prosecuting attorney of Huron County in 1837. He served as a member of the State Senate in 1840 and 1841.

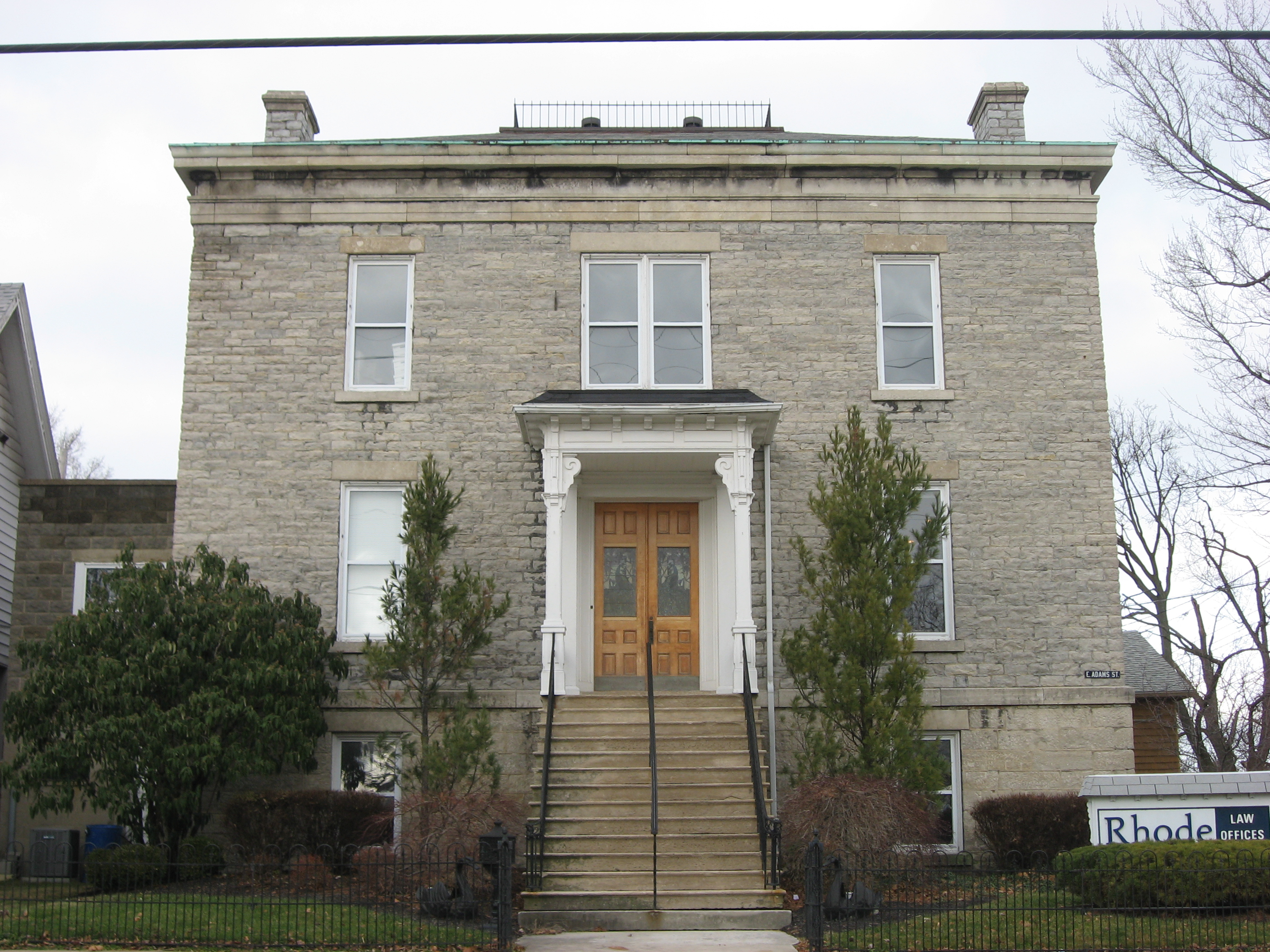
Root's home in Sandusky

Root was elected as a Whig to the Twenty-ninth Congress. He was reelected to the Thirtieth Congress and reelected as a Free-Soil candidate to the Thirty-first Congress (March 4, 1845 – March 3, 1851). In 1848, he introduced a resolution that recommended New Mexico and California have territorial governments which excluded slavery. He served as chairman of the Committee on Expenditures in the Department of the Treasury (Thirtieth Congress). He served as Presidential elector on the Republican ticket in 1860. He was appointed United States Attorney for the northern district of Ohio in 1861. He was again a member of the Ohio Senate in 1869. He served as Democratic delegate to the State constitutional convention in 1873. He was an unsuccessful Democratic candidate for probate judge of Erie County in 1875.

=== Death and legacy ===
He died in Sandusky, Ohio, April 7, 1879. He was interred in Oakland Cemetery.

The Joseph Root House in Sandusky may have been a "safe house" on the Underground Railroad, and is listed on the National Register of Historic Places.

== Sources ==
- United States Congress. "Joseph M. Root (id: R000433)". Biographical Directory of the United States Congress.

U.S. House of Representatives
Preceded by Edward S. Hamlin	Member of the U.S. House of Representatives from Ohio's 21st congressional district 1845-1851	Succeeded by Norton S. Townshend
