= Jeremiah Russell =

American politician

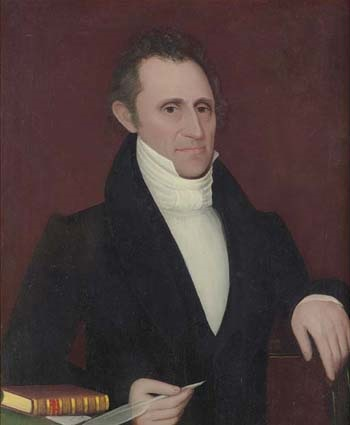

Member of the U.S. House of Representatives from New York's 10th district
- In office March 4, 1843 – March 3, 1845
- Preceded by: Daniel D. Barnard
- Succeeded by: Samuel Gordon

Personal details
- Born: January 26, 1786 Saugerties, New York
- Died: September 30, 1867 (aged 81) Saugerties, New York, U.S.
- Party: Democratic
- Occupation: Banking

Jeremiah Russell (January 26, 1786 – September 30, 1867) was an American businessman and banker who served one term as a U.S. representative from New York from 1843 to 1845.

== Biography ==
Born in Saugerties, New York, Russell received limited schooling. His father died when Russell was nine years old, and he aided in the support of his family by working on local farms until becoming a clerk in a store in order to learn the retail business.

He served as postmaster in Saugerties, and engaged in several business ventures, including ownership of a general store shipbuilding, real estate, road and turnpike construction, and banking. Russell later transferred most of his business ventures to his sons and concentrated on banking.

=== Political career ===
He served Town Supervisor from 1825 to 1828, 1830 to 1833, and 1837 to 1840. He was twice a presidential elector, casting his ballot for Andrew Jackson and John C. Calhoun in 1828, and for Martin Van Buren and Richard Mentor Johnson in 1836. Russell was a member of the New York State Assembly in 1842.

==== Congress ====
Russell was elected as a Democrat to the Twenty-eighth Congress (March 4, 1843 – March 3, 1845). He was an unsuccessful candidate for reelection in 1844 to the Twenty-ninth Congress, and afterwards resumed his banking and business interests.

== Death and burial ==
Russell died in Saugerties on September 30, 1867, and was interred in Mountain View Cemetery.

== Family ==
Russell was married twice. In 1806 he married Elizabeth Moose (1788-1846). In 1847 he married Christina Crawford (1801-1883).

With his first wife Russell was the father of eight children, including William Fiero Russell, who also served in Congress.

== Sources ==
U.S. House of Representatives
Preceded by Daniel D. Barnard	Member of the U.S. House of Representatives from New York's 10th congressional district 1843–1845	Succeeded by Samuel Gordon
