= Daniel Elliott Huger =

American politician (1779–1854)

United States Senator from South Carolina
- In office March 4, 1843 – March 3, 1845
- Preceded by: John C. Calhoun
- Succeeded by: John C. Calhoun

Member of the South Carolina Senate from St. Philip's and St. Michael's Parish
- In office November 26, 1838 – December 17, 1841; Alongside Thomas Bennett, Jr. and Ker Boyce

Member of the South Carolina House of Representatives from St. Philip's and St. Michael's Parish
- In office November 22, 1830 – December 17, 1831

Member of the South Carolina House of Representatives from St. Andrew's Parish
- In office November 26, 1804 – December 18, 1819

Personal details
- Born: June 28, 1779 "Limerick," Berkeley County, South Carolina
- Died: August 21, 1854 (aged 75) Sullivan's Island, South Carolina
- Party: Democratic (from 1824); Federalist (until 1824)
- Education: College of New Jersey
- Profession: lawyer, judge

Military service
- Branch/service: South Carolina militia
- Years of service: 1814
- Rank: Brigadier General

Daniel Elliott Huger (June 28, 1779 – August 21, 1854) was a United States senator from South Carolina. Born on Limerick plantation, Berkeley County (near Charleston), his father was Daniel Huger, a Continental Congressman and U.S. Representative from South Carolina. Daniel Elliott pursued classical studies in Charleston and graduated from the College of New Jersey (later Princeton University) in 1798. He studied law and was admitted to the bar in 1799, beginning practice in Charleston. In 1800 he married Isabella Johannes Middleton-daughter of Declaration of Independence signer Arthur Middleton. He was a member of the South Carolina House of Representatives from 1804 to 1819 and from 1830 to 1832, and was a brigadier general of State troops in 1814. He was judge of the circuit court from 1819 to 1830, and was a member of the South Carolina State Senate from 1838 to 1842. He was an opposition member of the State nullification convention in 1832.

Huger was elected as a State Rights Democrat to the U.S. Senate to fill the vacancy caused by the resignation of John C. Calhoun and served from March 4, 1843 to March 4, 1845, when he resigned. He was a delegate to the state-rights convention in 1852, where he urged moderation. Huger died on Sullivan's Island; interment was in Magnolia Cemetery, Charleston. A son was Colonel John Middleton Huger (1809–1894) whose son married a daughter of CS General Leonidas Polk (who was related by marriage to US Presidents Andrew Jackson and James Knox Polk). Daniel Elliott Huger's grandson-in-law was CS General Arthur Middleton Manigault.

In 1818, he bought the Daniel Elliott Huger House in Charleston. He owned slaves.

== Notes ==
U.S. Senate
Preceded by John C. Calhoun	U.S. senator (Class 2) from South Carolina; 1843–1845; Served alongside: George McDuffie	Succeeded by John C. Calhoun
