= Samuel Beardsley =

American politician and judge (1790–1860)

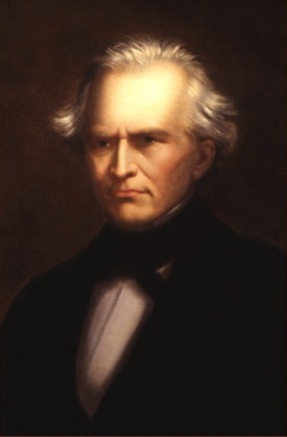

Member of the U.S. House of Representatives from New York
- In office March 4, 1843 – February 29, 1844
- Preceded by: Samuel Gordon
- Succeeded by: Levi D. Carpenter
- Constituency: 20th district
- In office March 4, 1831 – March 29, 1836
- Preceded by: Henry R. Storrs
- Succeeded by: Rutger B. Miller
- Constituency: 14th district (1831–33); 17th district (1833–36)

Chair of the House Judiciary Committee
- In office 1835–1836
- Preceded by: Thomas Flournoy Foster
- Succeeded by: Francis Thomas

14th New York Attorney General
- In office January 12, 1836 – February 4, 1839
- Governor: William L. Marcy; William H. Seward
- Preceded by: Greene C. Bronson
- Succeeded by: Willis Hall

Member of the New York Senate from the 5th district
- In office January 1, 1823 – December 31, 1823
- Preceded by: New district
- Succeeded by: Perley Keyes

Personal details
- Born: February 6, 1790 Hoosick, New York, U.S.
- Died: May 6, 1860 (aged 70) Utica, New York, U.S.
- Resting place: Forest Hill Cemetery; Utica, New York, U.S.
- Party: Jacksonian, Democrat
- Profession: lawyer; politician

Military service
- Allegiance: State of New York; United States of America
- Branch/service: New York Militia; United States Army
- Rank: Captain
- Battles/wars: War of 1812; Defense of Sacket's Harbor

Samuel Beardsley (February 6, 1790 – May 6, 1860) was an American attorney, judge and legislator from New York. During his career he served as a member of the United States House of Representatives, New York Attorney General, United States Attorney for the Northern District of New York, a member of the New York State Senate, and a justice of the New York Supreme Court.

== Early life ==
Born in Hoosick, New York on February 6, 1790, the son of Obadiah Beardsley and Eunice (Moore) Beardsley. His siblings included Levi Beardsley, who served in both the New York State Assembly and the New York State Senate.

Beardsley's family soon moved to Monticello, an unincorporated village of Richfield, and he was educated in the local schools of his new hometown. He taught school and began the study of medicine with Dr. Joseph White of Cherry Valley, but later decided to pursue a legal career, and moved to Rome, New York to study law with Judge Joshua Hathaway.

Beardsley served in the 157th Regiment of the New York State Militia during the War of 1812, he rose through the ranks to become the regimental adjutant with the rank of captain. He was later commissioned as a quartermaster in the United States Army, and took part in the Defense of Sacket's Harbor in 1813. Beardsley was admitted to the bar in 1815 and commenced practice in Watertown, New York. After his admission to the bar, he continued to serve in the militia as judge advocate of the 13th Brigade.

== Early career ==
In 1816 Beardsley returned to Rome, New York, and continued the practice of law. From 1821 to 1825, he served as district attorney of Oneida County. In 1822 he was elected to a one-year term in the New York State Senate (1823), and in 1823 he moved to Utica. He was United States Attorney for the Northern District of New York from 1823 to 1830.

=== Congress ===
Elected as a Jacksonian to the 22nd Congress, Beardsley was U. S. Representative for the fourteenth district of New York from March 4, 1831, to March 3, 1833. During the 23rd and 24th United States Congresses Beardsley served as U.S. Representative for the seventeenth district from March 4, 1833, to March 29, 1836, when he resigned. During the Twenty-fourth Congress he was chairman of the Committee on the Judiciary. He was one of the "principal citizens" participating in the anti-abolitionist mob that broke up the 1835 meeting in Utica, called by Beriah Green, to set up a New York State Antislavery Society.

=== Return to legislature ===
In 1836, Beardsley was elected by the New York State Legislature to the office of New York State Attorney General after his predecessor Greene C. Bronson became a justice of the New York Supreme Court, and he served until 1838.

== State Supreme Court ==
Elected as a Democrat to the Twenty-eighth United States Congress, Beardsley served as U. S. Representative for the twentieth district from March 4, 1843, to February 29, 1844, when he resigned to accept the appointment as associate justice of the New York Supreme Court. He sat on the bench from 1844 to 1847, and was chief justice from June 29 to July 5, 1847. Afterwards he resumed the practice of law in Utica and New York City.

== Death and burial ==
Beardsley died in Utica, Oneida County, New York on May 6, 1860. He was interred at the Forest Hill Cemetery, Utica, New York.

== Family ==
In 1816, Beardsley was married to Sarah Hathaway (1793-1869), the daughter of Joshua Hathaway, under whom Beardsley had studied law. They were the parents of one child who lived to adulthood, Arthur. Arthur Moore Beardsley became an attorney, and had a successful career in Utica and New York City.

== Sources ==
=== Books ===
- Bagg, Moses Mears (1892). Memorial History of Utica, N.Y.: From Its Settlement to the Present Time. Syracuse, NY: D. Mason & Co. pp. 513–517.
- Everts & Fariss (1878). History of Oneida County, New York. Philadelphia, PA: J. B. Lippincott & Co. p. 369.
- Hastings, Hugh (1901). Military Minutes of the Council of Appointment of the State of New York. Vol. III. Albany, NY: James B. Lyon. p. 1971.
- Johnston, Elizabeth Bryant (1894). Lineage Book. Vol. VI. Washington, DC: National Society of the Daughters of the American. p. 151.
- Orcutt, Samuel (1886). A History of the Old Town of Stratford and the City Bridgeport. Vol. 2. Fairfield, CT: Fairfield County Historical Society. p. 1138.
- United States House of Representatives (2006). A History of the Committee on the Judiciary, 1813-2006. Washington, DC: US Government Printing Office. p. 445. ISBN 9780160845789.
- Wager, Daniel Elbridge (1896). Our County and Its People: A Descriptive Work on Oneida County, New York. Boston, MA: Boston History Company. p. 169.
- Webster, Dennis; Peck, Bernadette (2014). Haunted Utica: Mohawk Valley Ghosts and Other Historic Haunts. Charleston, SC: History Press. p. 3. ISBN 978-1-62584-593-1.

New York State Senate
| Preceded by new district | New York State Senate; Fifth District (Class 1); 1823 | Succeeded by Perley Keyes |
Legal offices
| Preceded by Jacob Sutherland | U.S. Attorney for the Northern District of New York; 1823–1831 | Succeeded by Nathaniel S. Benton |
U.S. House of Representatives
| Preceded by Henry R. Storrs | Member of the U.S. House of Representatives from New York's 14th congressional district 1831–1833 | Succeeded by Ransom H. Gillet |
| Preceded by John W. Taylor | Member of the U.S. House of Representatives from New York's 17th congressional district 1833–1836 | Succeeded by Rutger B. Miller |
Legal offices
| Preceded by Greene C. Bronson | New York Attorney General; 1836–1839 | Succeeded by Willis Hall |
U.S. House of Representatives
| Preceded by Samuel Gordon | Member of the U.S. House of Representatives from New York's 20th congressional district 1843–1844 | Succeeded by Levi D. Carpenter |
