= Pierre Bossier =

American planter and politician (1797–1844)

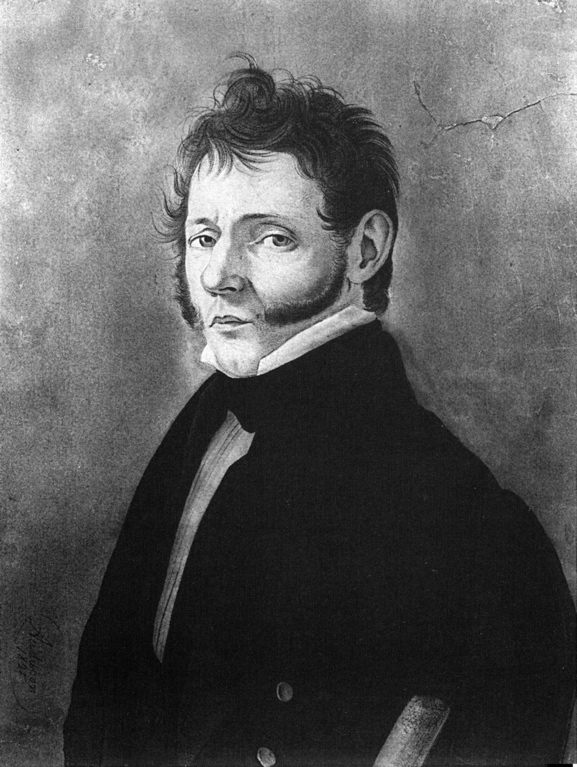
- Portrait of Jean Baptiste Bossier by John James Audubon, 1821

Member of the U.S. House of Representatives from Louisiana's 4th district
- In office March 4, 1843 – April 24, 1844
- Preceded by: District established
- Succeeded by: Isaac Edward Morse

Member of the Louisiana State Senate
- In office 1833–1843

Personal details
- Born: March 22, 1797 Natchitoches, Province of Louisiana
- Died: April 24, 1844 (aged 47) Washington, D.C., U.S.
- Resting place: Catholic Cemetery; Natchitoches, Louisiana
- Party: Democratic
- Occupation: Planter, politician

Pierre Evariste Jean-Baptiste Bossier (March 22, 1797 – April 24, 1844) was a Louisiana Creole planter, soldier and statesman born in Natchitoches, Louisiana. He owned cotton and sugarcane plantations and served in the state senate for ten years before serving as a U.S. Congressman.

== Early life ==
Born in Natchitoches in 1797, during the period of Spanish rule in Louisiana, Pierre Evariste Jean-Baptiste Bossier was the son of the planter François Paul Bossier and Catherine Pélagie Lambre. He was descended from Jean Bossier who had migrated to Louisiana from France in 1718 as an indentured servant. Pierre received a classic liberal education by a private tutor.

== Career ==
Bossier was a planter like his father and cultivated cotton and sugar as commodity crops on his plantation, Live Oaks, located on the Cane River in Natchitoches Parish. He also served in the Louisiana Militia where he reached the rank of General. He entered politics as a Democrat and was elected as a member of the Louisiana State Senate in 1832, defeating Whig opponent Louis Gustave De Russy. Bossier served in the State Senate from 1833 to 1843.

In March 1843, Bossier was elected to the U.S. House of Representatives for the newly established Louisiana's 4th congressional district. He was a supporter of Westward expansion, including the annexation of Texas. He served from March 4, 1843 until his death in office a year later on April 24, 1844, in Washington, D.C. before his first term had ended.

Driven by grief over the duel and its fallout, Bossier committed suicide. His coffin was placed in the well of Old Hall of the House and services were conducted by James A. Ryder S.J., then the president of Georgetown University. Bossier's remains are interred at the Catholic Cemetery in Natchitoches.

In the summer of 1839, a political argument between a prominent Whig, General F. Gaiennie, and State Senator General P. E. Bossier, a Democrat, escalated to recriminations published in the local newspaper. Gaiennie, also a general in the state militia, had denounced Bossier as a coward. Bossier demanded a duel and Gaiennie accepted, choosing rifles as the most deadly weapon available. The duel occurred the following autumn on the grounds of Cherokee Plantation, which was owned by Emile Sompayrac in Natchitoches Parish. Gaiennie fired first and missed, Bossier hit Gaiennie in the heart, killing him instantly. Another eleven men died in the aftermath, as animosities related to the duel continued to play out.

== Legacy and honors ==
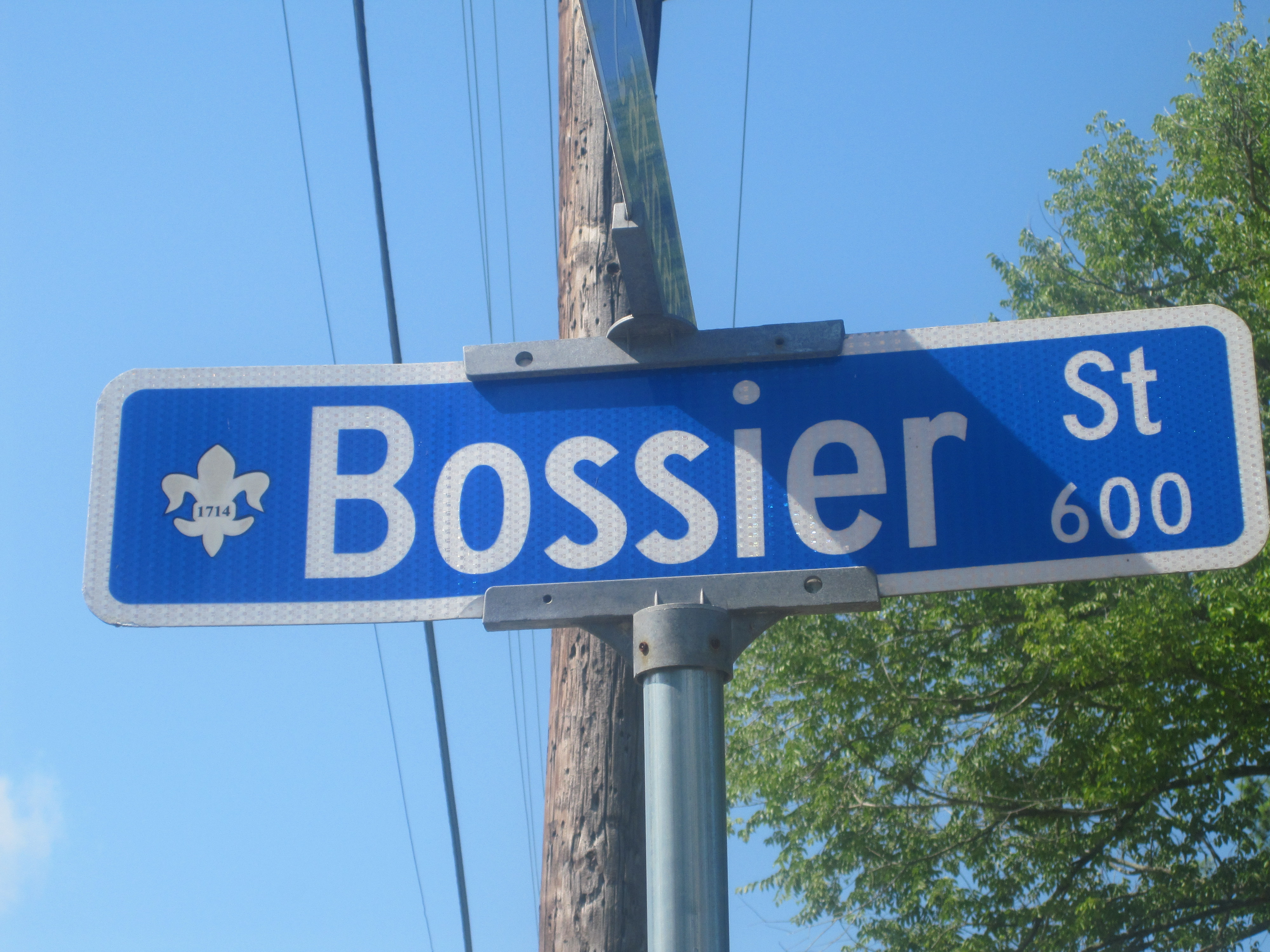
Bossier Street in Natchitoches is named for Pierre Bossier.

Bossier Parish was established in 1843 and named after Bossier. Bossier City, the largest city in Bossier Parish, was also named after him, as was the Pierre Bossier Mall.

== See also ==
- List of members of the United States Congress who died in office (1790–1899)
- List of duels in the United States

U.S. House of Representatives
New district	Member of the U.S. House of Representatives from Louisiana's 4th congressional district 1843 – 1844	Succeeded by Isaac Edward Morse
