= Lakeview Terrace (Cleveland) =

Coordinates: 41°29′32″N 81°42′36″W

Lakeview Tower
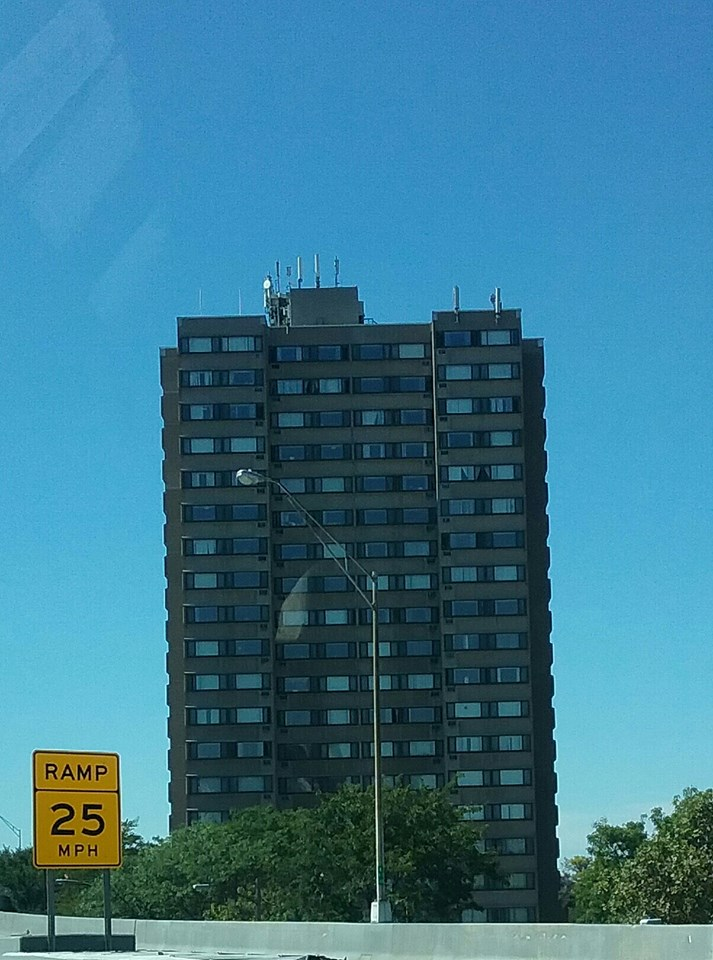
- Interactive map of the Lakeview Tower area
- Former names: Lakeview Terrace

General information
- Type: Residential
- Location: 2700 Washington Avenue Cleveland, Ohio 44113 United States
- Construction started: 1971
- Completed: 1973

Height
- Roof: 63.39 m (208 ft)

Technical details
- Floor count: 19
- Floor area: 211 units

Design and construction
- Architects: Weinberg, Conrad and Teare

Lakeview Terrace is a set of row houses, apartments, and a high-rise residential building in the Ohio City neighborhood of Cleveland, Ohio. Established in 1935, the project culminated in the opening of a 1973 high-rise building called Lakeville Tower. The apartment tower is 208 feet tall and contains 19 stories. The complex is notable for being one of the first public housing projects in the country.

== History ==
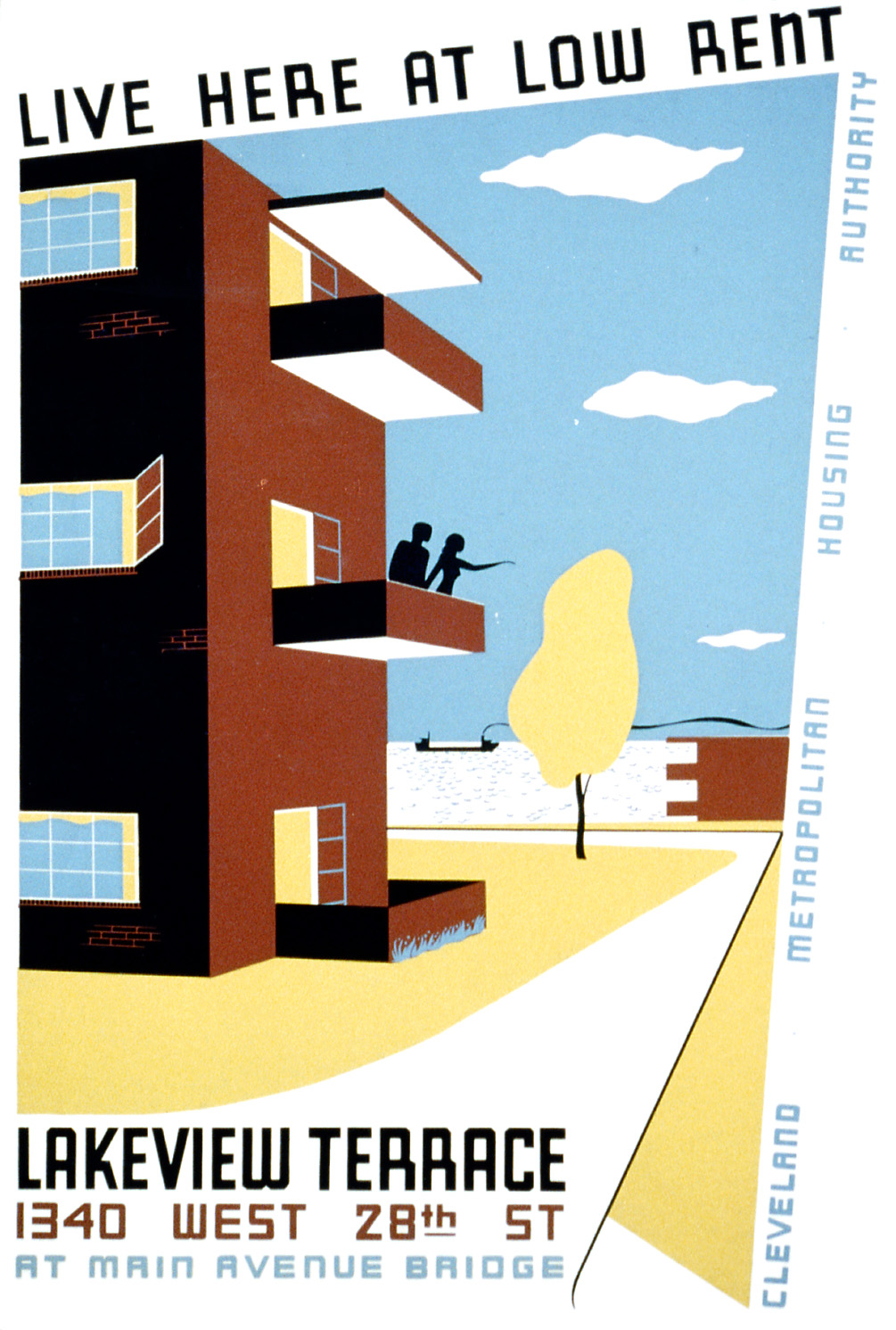
WPA poster for affordable housing at Lakeview Terrace (1940)

Public housing was vital following the rising population of Cleveland in the 1920s and 1930s. Overcrowding in the central areas of city was decried and it was reasoned that the local government must intervene in some way to minimize the negative effects of this overcrowding. This demand led to the planning and development of what would become the Lakeview Terrace complex. It was commissioned by the Cuyahoga Metropolitan Housing Authority's first director Ernest J. Bohn in 1935 to supplement the declining availability of low-cost housing in the metropolitan area of Cleveland, the complex would include a community center to engage residents in issues relating to neighborhood safety and education. It is also worthy of mention that Lakeview was one of the first attempts to offer lower cost housing for poorer residents in the urban center. The formula regarding the establishment of public housing that Cleveland pioneered would be adopted by the urban cities of Chicago, Detroit, New York City, Los Angeles, St. Louis, Philadelphia and many others. In fact, many cities have their own either mini or mega versions of Lakeview. At the time of its construction, Cleveland was praised for being on the cutting edge of urban dwelling planning. The entire complex was designed by Joseph L. Weinberg, William H. Conrad, and Wallace G. Teare and was entirely fireproofed throughout.

== Lakeview Tower ==
The main focus is the 1973-erected 211 unit Lakeview Tower. The residential tower (the second tallest public housing structure in the city after the Willson Tower on East 55th and Chester) stands as a symbol to Cleveland's commitment to safe, clean, and affordable public housing in generally under served urban communities. Its mass dominates the skyline in Ohio City and the Flats as it sits on a hill that overlooks downtown Cleveland. It is called Lakeview Tower because it looks out over Lake Erie to the north. In 2015, the Northeast Ohio Apartment Association gave the tower its Silver Award due to its promotion of safe and high professional standards.

== See also ==
- Willson Tower
- Bohn Tower
- Parkview Apartments (Cleveland)
