= Superior Avenue =

Street in Cleveland, Ohio

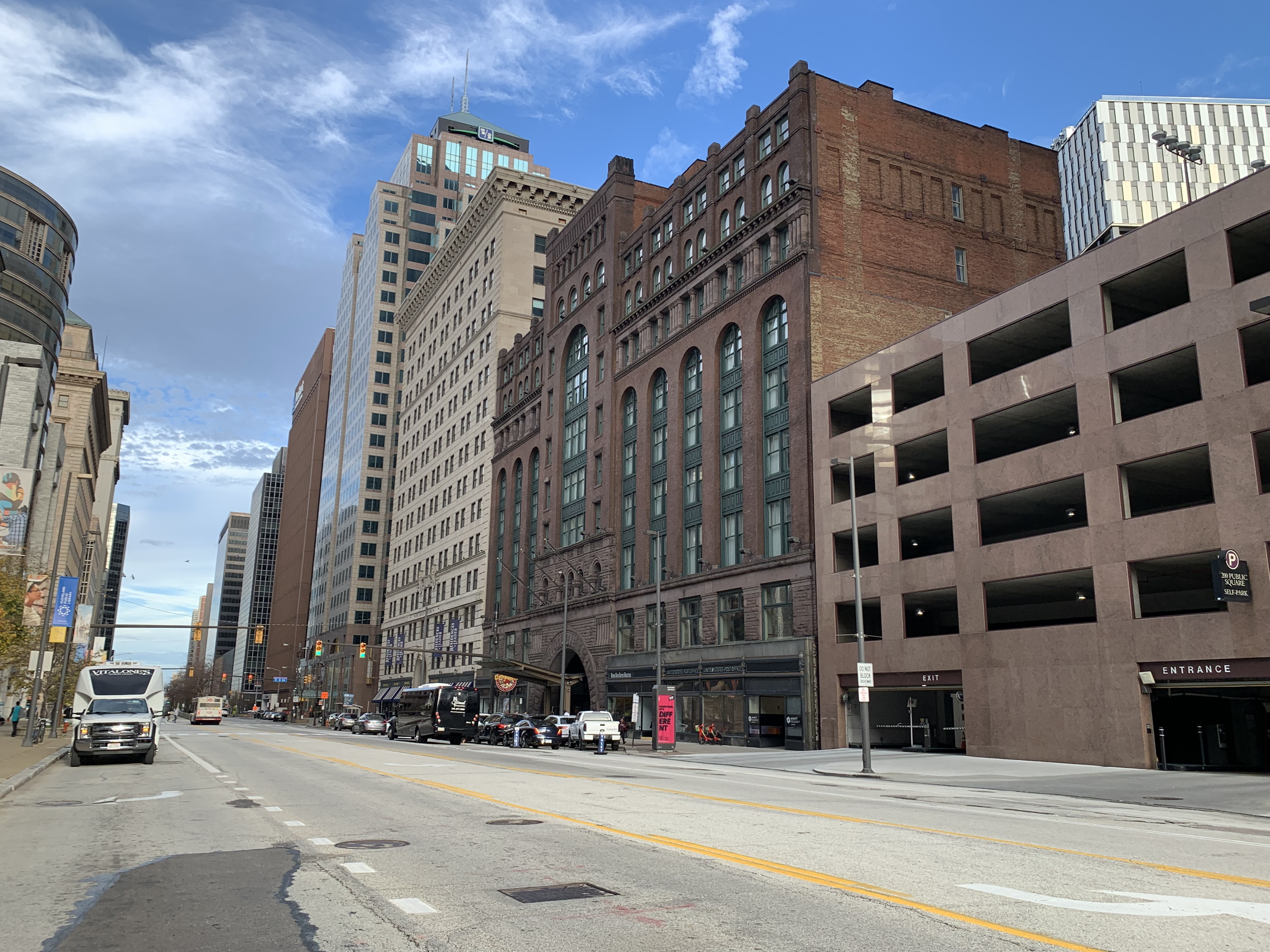
- Superior Avenue near Public Square
- Part of: US Route 6
- Location: Cleveland, Ohio

Superior Avenue is the main wide thoroughfare and part of U.S. Route 6 in Ohio in Downtown Cleveland, the largest and most populated city of Northeast Ohio. Superior runs through the central hub of Cleveland, Public Square. However, the only traffic that can go through the square is bus, bike, and pedestrian transportation. In 2016, the city of Cleveland completed renovation of the Public Square green space and it was decided that no civilian vehicular traffic should be allowed to traverse the park area. Public Square is the "hub" because all of the main streets in downtown jut out from this central greenery. To the east and west, Superior, to the north and south Ontario Street as all the north–south roads are Streets in Cleveland (which goes back to the 1906 Street Plan Decision, and diagonally to the southwest, Euclid Avenue.

Superior Avenue connects the east and west sides of the most populated downtown in Ohio. To the west, Superior Avenue connects to the Detroit Avenue extension which starts at the terminus of Superior, the Detroit-Superior Bridge that crosses over the Cuyahoga River into Ohio City. Detroit then runs through the entire west side of Cleveland, through the inner ring suburbs of Lakewood, Rocky River, the outer ring suburb of Westlake and on into the exurbs of Lorain County.

To the east this main drag runs through the length of several downtown districts out into the St. Clair-Superior and Glenville neighborhoods of the city. It continues through the suburbs of East Cleveland, Cleveland Heights, and terminates as it dead ends into the eastside boulevard, Mayfield Road. Unlike the westside which is fairly straight as it follows closely to the shore line of Lake Erie, the east side pattern of Superior twists and winds its way through the streets and communities of Greater Cleveland.

An address along Superior, especially downtown, is considered to be extremely exclusive, akin to Wilshire Boulevard in Los Angeles or Wall Street and/or Park Avenue in New York City. In fact, a number of important businesses, offices, and government institutions are located along Superior Avenue solely because this is the case.

== Businesses, buildings, and government agencies ==
- 1111 Superior Avenue
- 1717 East Ninth Building
- AmTrust Financial Building
- Asian Town Center
- Bohn Tower
- Carl B. Stokes United States Courthouse Tower
- Cleveland Arcade
- Cleveland Cliffs Natural Resources
- Cleveland Fire Training Academy
- Cleveland Flea Market
- Cleveland Metropolitan School District Professional Center
- Cleveland Public Library Main Branch
- Cleveland Public Library Stokes Wing at CPL
- Cleveland Renaissance Hotel
- Daffy Dan's
- Federal Reserve Bank of Cleveland
- Fifth Third Center
- Forest Hill Reserve Park
- Frank J. Lausche State Office Building
- Hot Cards
- Howard M. Metzenbaum United States Courthouse
- Huntington Building
- IBM of Cleveland
- Lake View Cemetery
- Oswald Companies
- Perry-Payne Building
- The Plain Dealer Plaza
- Red Space
- Reserve Square
- Rockefeller Building (Cleveland)
- St.John's Cathedral
- St. Peter's Catholic Church
- Superior Building
- Tower Press Building
- The Virgil E. Brown Center

== See also ==
- Euclid Avenue, Cleveland
- Nine-Twelve District
- University Circle
- Warehouse District
