= Babka (disambiguation) =

Babka is a sweet braided bread or cake of Ashkenazi Jewish origin, filled with a variety of sweet or savory fillings.

Babka may also refer to:

- Baba (cake), or babka, a type of Easter bread popular in Eastern Europe often containing raisins
- Potato babka, a savoury Belarusian dish made from potato
- Babka (fish), a genus of fish in the family Gobiidae
- Babka (river), a river in Russia
- Babka (surname)

== See also ==
- General Babka (disambiguation)
- Babka Tower, a skyscraper in Warsaw, Poland
