= Hracholusky =

Hracholusky may refer to places in the Czech Republic:

- Hracholusky (Prachatice District), a municipality and village in the South Bohemian Region
- Hracholusky (Rakovník District), a municipality and village in the Central Bohemian Region
- Hracholusky, a village and part of Úlice in the Plzeň Region
