= Babka (surname) =

Babka is a surname. Notable people with the surname include:

- Daniel Babka (born 1972), Slovak professional ice hockey defenceman
- Jim Babka (born 1968), American writer, activist, and former radio talk-show host
- John J. Babka (1884–1937), U.S. Representative from Ohio
- Marie Babka (1885–1978), former member of the Ohio House of Representatives from Cuyahoga County
- Rink Babka (1936–2022), former American discus thrower
