= Charles Vanik =

American politician (1913–2007)

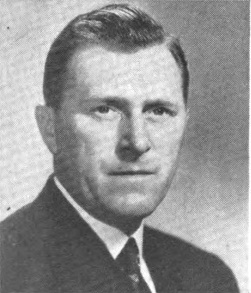
- Vanik in 1955

Member of the U.S. House of Representatives from Ohio
- In office January 3, 1955 – January 3, 1981
- Preceded by: Robert Crosser (21st); Frances P. Bolton (22nd)
- Succeeded by: Louis Stokes (21st); Dennis E. Eckart (22nd)
- Constituency: 21st district (1955-69); 22nd district (1969-81)

Member of the Ohio State Senate
- In office 1940–1942

Personal details
- Born: Charles Albert Vanik; April 7, 1913 Cleveland, Ohio
- Died: August 30, 2007 (aged 94) Jupiter, Florida
- Party: Democratic
- Education: Case Western Reserve University; CWRU School of Law

Military service
- Allegiance: United States
- Branch/service: U.S. Naval Reserve
- Battles/wars: World War II

Charles Albert Vanik (April 7, 1913 – August 30, 2007) was a Democratic politician from Ohio. He served in the United States House of Representatives from 1955 to 1981.

== Early life ==
Vanik was born in Cleveland, Ohio, the son of Stella (née Kvasnicka) and Charles Albert Vanik, a butcher. He was of Czech ancestry. His maternal grandmother, Alžběta Seberová (1868–1948), was born in village Hracholusky, southern Bohemia (then part of the Austria-Hungary). Vanik completed undergraduate studies and a law degree at Western Reserve University. After serving on the Cleveland City Council from 1938 to 1939 and the Ohio State Senate from 1940 to 1942, Vanik enlisted in the U.S. Naval Reserve, seeing action in both the Atlantic and Pacific theaters. After the war, Vanik served as a city judge from 1946 to 1954.

== United States House of Representatives ==
In 1954, he ran for Ohio's 21st congressional district. The district, located on Cleveland's East Side, was evenly divided between African Americans, who were then solidly Republican voters, and whites, who were mostly Democrats. In the Democratic primary, Vanik defeated longtime incumbent Congressman Robert Crosser as well as African-American challenger John Holly, founder of the Negro Future Outlook League.

In the general election, Vanik defeated African-American Republican Francis E. Young, who helped organize the Cleveland branch of the NAACP. Vanik shifted districts in 1968 to the neighboring 22nd district, to make way for Louis Stokes whose growing political operation had challenged him in previous races, defeating Frances P. Bolton, who had served the district since 1939. Vanik served in the district until 1981.

In 1974, Vanik sponsored the Jackson–Vanik amendment with Sen. Henry "Scoop" Jackson, which denied normal trade relations to certain countries with non-market economies that restricted the freedom of emigration. The amendment was intended to allow refugees, particularly religious minorities, to escape from the Soviet Bloc. During this time, Vanik was the chair of the House Ways and Means Subcommittee on Trade.

He used to insert into the Congressional Record what he called the "Annual Corporate Tax Study" in which he'd list corporations that paid little to no federal income taxes.

In 1982, Vanik contested for the Democratic nomination for lieutenant-governor of Ohio as running mate with Ohio Attorney General William J. Brown who was running for governor. The ticket lost to Richard F. Celeste and Myrl Shoemaker. Vanik was known for wearing black bow ties with every suit.

== Death ==
Vanik died in his sleep on August 30, 2007, at his home in Jupiter, Florida. He was 94. He was survived by his wife, Betty, one son, one daughter and two grandchildren.

U.S. House of Representatives
Preceded by Robert Crosser	Member of the U.S. House of Representatives from Ohio's 21st congressional district 1955–1969	Succeeded by Louis Stokes
Preceded by Frances P. Bolton	Member of the U.S. House of Representatives from Ohio's 22nd congressional district 1969–1981	Succeeded by Dennis E. Eckart
