= Ohio's 21st congressional district =

Defunct U.S. Congress electoral division

Coordinates: 41°25′N 81°40′W

- Obsolete district
- Created: 1840; 1870
- Eliminated: 1860; 1990
- Years active: 1843-1863; 1883-1993

The 21st congressional district of Ohio was a congressional district in the U.S. state of Ohio. It was eliminated in the redistricting following the 1990 census.

In its last decade, the district consisted of a large portion of eastern Cuyahoga county.

== List of members representing the district ==
Member	Party	Year(s)	Cong ress	Electoral history
District established March 4, 1843
Henry R. Brinkerhoff (Plymouth)	Democratic	March 4, 1843 – April 30, 1844	28th	Elected in 1843. Died.
Vacant		April 30, 1844 – October 8, 1844	28th	
Edward S. Hamlin (Elyria)	Whig	October 8, 1844 – March 3, 1845	28th	Elected to finish Brinkerhoff's term. [data missing]
Joseph M. Root (Sandusky)	Whig	March 4, 1845 – March 3, 1849	29th 30th 31st	Elected in 1844. Re-elected in 1846. Re-elected in 1848. [data missing]
Joseph M. Root (Sandusky)	Free Soil	March 4, 1849 – March 3, 1851	29th 30th 31st	Elected in 1844. Re-elected in 1846. Re-elected in 1848. [data missing]
Norton Strange Townshend (Avon)	Democratic	March 4, 1851 – March 3, 1853	32nd	Elected in 1850. [data missing]
Andrew Stuart (Steubenville)	Democratic	March 4, 1853 – March 3, 1855	33rd	Elected in 1852. Lost re-election.
John Bingham (Cadiz)	Anti-Nebraska	March 4, 1855 – March 3, 1857	34th 35th 36th 37th	Elected in 1854. Re-elected in 1856. Re-elected in 1858. Re-elected in 1860. Redistricted to the 16th district and lost re-election.
John Bingham (Cadiz)	Republican	March 4, 1857 – March 3, 1863	34th 35th 36th 37th	Elected in 1854. Re-elected in 1856. Re-elected in 1858. Re-elected in 1860. Redistricted to the 16th district and lost re-election.
District dissolved March 3, 1863
District re-established March 4, 1883
Martin A. Foran (Cleveland)	Democratic	March 4, 1883 – March 3, 1889	48th 49th 50th	Elected in 1882. Re-elected in 1884. Re-elected in 1886. Retired.
Theodore E. Burton (Cleveland)	Republican	March 4, 1889 – March 3, 1891	51st	Elected in 1888. Lost re-election.
Tom L. Johnson (Cleveland)	Democratic	March 4, 1891 – March 3, 1895	52nd 53rd	Elected in 1890. Re-elected in 1892. Lost re-election.
Theodore E. Burton (Cleveland)	Republican	March 4, 1895 – March 3, 1909	54th 55th 56th 57th 58th 59th 60th	Elected in 1894. Re-elected in 1896. Re-elected in 1898. Re-elected in 1900. Re-elected in 1902. Re-elected in 1904. Re-elected in 1906. Re-elected in 1908. Resigned when elected U.S. Senator.
Vacant		March 3, 1909 – April 20, 1909	60th 61st	
James H. Cassidy (Cleveland)	Republican	April 20, 1909 – March 3, 1911	61st	Elected to finish Burton's term. [data missing]
Robert J. Bulkley (Cleveland)	Democratic	March 4, 1911 – March 3, 1915	62nd 63rd	Elected in 1910. Re-elected in 1912. [data missing]
Robert Crosser (Cleveland)	Democratic	March 4, 1915 – March 3, 1919	64th 65th	Elected in 1914. Re-elected in 1916. Lost renomination.
John J. Babka (Cleveland)	Democratic	March 4, 1919 – March 3, 1921	66th	Elected in 1918. Lost re-election.
Harry C. Gahn (Cleveland)	Republican	March 4, 1921 – March 3, 1923	67th	Elected in 1920. Lost re-election.
Robert Crosser (Cleveland)	Democratic	March 4, 1923 – January 3, 1955	68th 69th 70th 71st 72nd 73rd 74th 75th 76th 77th 78th 79th 80th 81st 82nd 83rd	Elected in 1922. Re-elected in 1924. Re-elected in 1926. Re-elected in 1928. Re-elected in 1930. Re-elected in 1932. Re-elected in 1934. Re-elected in 1936. Re-elected in 1938. Re-elected in 1940. Re-elected in 1942. Re-elected in 1944. Re-elected in 1946. Re-elected in 1948. Re-elected in 1950. Re-elected in 1952. Lost renomination.
Charles Vanik (Cleveland)	Democratic	January 3, 1955 – January 3, 1969	84th 85th 86th 87th 88th 89th 90th	Elected in 1954. Re-elected in 1956. Re-elected in 1958. Re-elected in 1960. Re-elected in 1962. Re-elected in 1964. Re-elected in 1966. Ran in the 22nd district.
Louis Stokes (Shaker Heights)	Democratic	January 3, 1969 – January 3, 1993	91st 92nd 93rd 94th 95th 96th 97th 98th 99th 100th 101st 102nd	Elected in 1968. Re-elected in 1970. Re-elected in 1972. Re-elected in 1974. Re-elected in 1976. Re-elected in 1978. Re-elected in 1980. Re-elected in 1982. Re-elected in 1984. Re-elected in 1986. Re-elected in 1988. Re-elected in 1990. Redistricted to the 11th district.
District dissolved January 3, 1993

== Election results ==
Bold type indicates victor. Italic type indicates incumbent.

Year	Democratic	Republican	Other
1920	John J. Babka (incumbent): 18,252	✓ Harry C. Gahn: 27,127	Henry Skinner: 558
1922	✓ Robert W. Crosser: 18,645	Harry C. Gahn (incumbent): 14,024	Henry Kuhlman (S): 997; Frank Kalcec (SL): 185
1924	✓ **Robert W. Crosser** (incumbent): 24,889	Harry C. Gahn: 21,629	John Brahtin (W): 272
1926	✓ **Robert W. Crosser** (incumbent): 17,819	Harry C. Gahn: 10,733	
1928	✓ **Robert W. Crosser** (incumbent): 39,090	Joseph F. Lange: 26,267	
1930	✓ **Robert W. Crosser** (incumbent): 30,722	George H. Bender: 29,081	Gustave F. Ebding: 96
1932	✓ **Robert W. Crosser** (incumbent): 49,436	Gerard Pilliod: 25,527	Joseph Schiffer (C): 672; Eugene F. Cheeks: 204
1934	✓ **Robert W. Crosser** (incumbent): 47,540	Frank W. Sotak: 25,253	E. C. Greenfield (C): 1,684
1936	✓ **Robert W. Crosser** (incumbent): 70,596	Harry C. Gahn: 23,811	
1938	✓ **Robert W. Crosser** (incumbent): 53,180	J. E. Chizek: 24,240	
1940	✓ **Robert W. Crosser** (incumbent): 79,602	J. E. Chizek: 23,658	
1942	✓ **Robert W. Crosser** (incumbent): 35,109	William J. Rogers: 19,137	Arnold S. Johnson: 744
1944	✓ **Robert W. Crosser** (incumbent): 77,525	Harry C. Gahn: 22,288	
1946	✓ **Robert W. Crosser** (incumbent): 49,111	James S. Hudee: 27,657	
1948	✓ **Robert W. Crosser** (incumbent): 72,417	Harry W. Mitchell: 22,932	
1950	✓ **Robert W. Crosser** (incumbent): 66,341	William Hodge: 21,588	
1952	✓ **Robert W. Crosser** (incumbent): 100,340	Lawrence O. Payne: 45,896	
1954	✓ Charles A. Vanik: 76,201	Francis E. Young: 24,076	
1956	✓ **Charles A. Vanik** (incumbent): 96,106	Chales H. Loeb: 38,060	
1958	✓ **Charles A. Vanik** (incumbent): 93,987	Elmer L. Watson: 22,956	
1960	✓ **Charles A. Vanik** (incumbent): 103,460	William O. Walker: 88,389	
1962	✓ **Charles A. Vanik** (incumbent): 79,514	Leodis Harris: 20,027	
1964	✓ **Charles A. Vanik** (incumbent): 113,157	Eugene E. Smith: 12,416	
1966	✓ **Charles A. Vanik** (incumbent): 81,210	Frederick M. Coleman: 18,205	
1968	✓ Louis Stokes: 85,509	Charles P. Lucas: 28,931	
1970	✓ **Louis Stokes** (incumbent): 74,340	Bill Mack: 21,440	
1972	✓ **Louis Stokes** (incumbent): 99,190	James D. Johnson: 13,861	Joseph Piriacin (SL): 5,779; Cecil Lampkins: 3,509
1974	✓ **Louis Stokes** (incumbent): 58,969	Bill Mack: 12,986	
1976	✓ **Louis Stokes** (incumbent): 91,903	Barbara Sparks: 12,434	Anthony R. Curry: 5,289
1978	✓ **Louis Stokes** (incumbent): 58,934	Bill Mack: 9,533	
1980	✓ **Louis Stokes** (incumbent): 83,188	Robert L. Woodall: 11,103	
1982	✓ **Louis Stokes** (incumbent): 132,544	Alan G. Shatteen: 21,332	
1984	✓ **Louis Stokes** (incumbent): 165,247	Robert L. Woodall: 29,500	
1986	✓ **Louis Stokes** (incumbent): 99,878	Franklin H. Roski: 22,594	
1988	✓ **Louis Stokes** (incumbent): 148,388	Franklin H. Roski: 24,804	
1990	✓ **Louis Stokes** (incumbent): 103,338	Franklin H. Roski: 25,906	
