= Robert Crosser =

American politician (1874–1957)

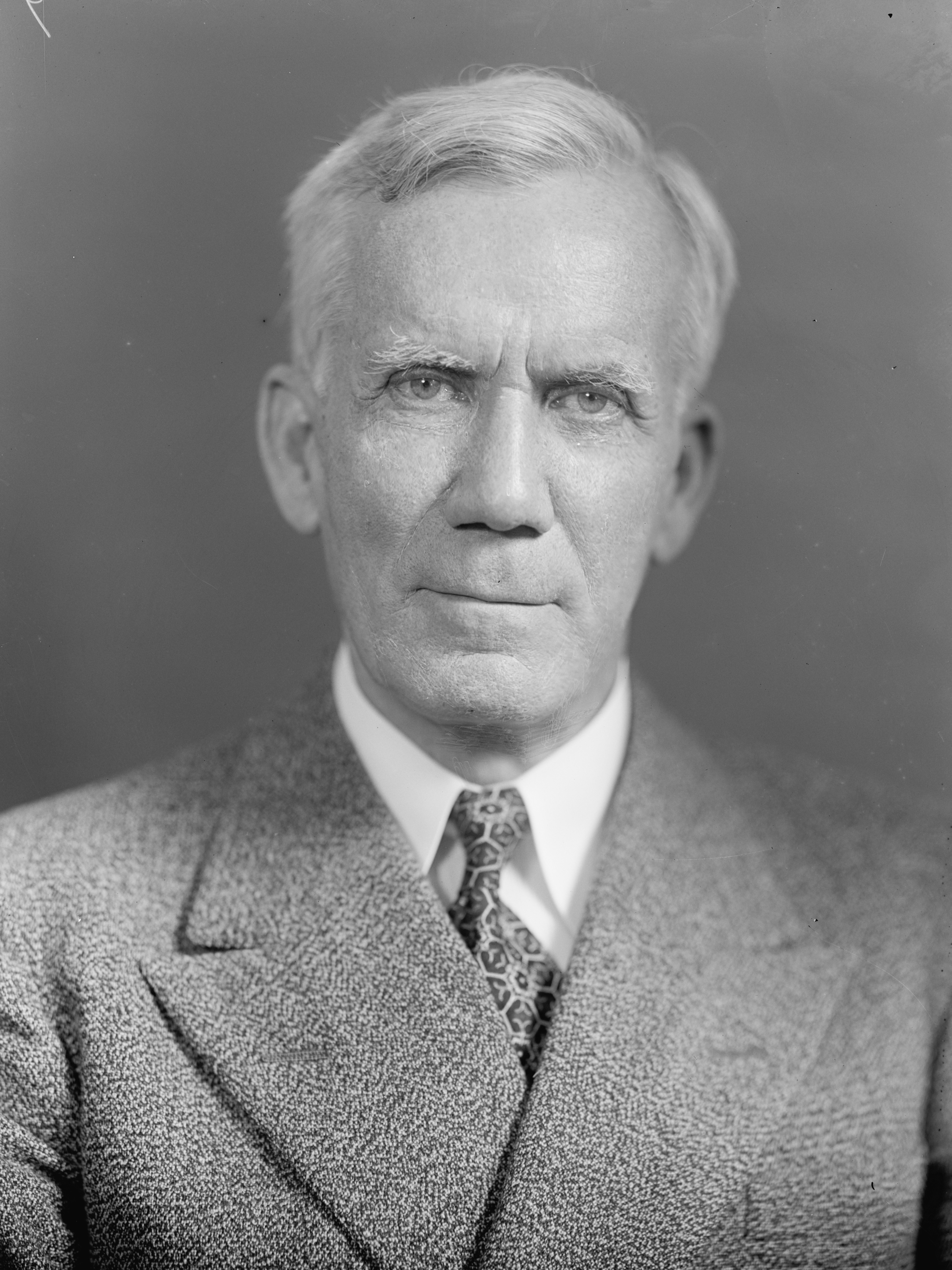
- Crosser in 1938

Member of the U.S. House of Representatives from Ohio
- In office March 4, 1913 – March 3, 1919
- Preceded by: inactive
- Succeeded by: John J. Babka
- Constituency: At Large (1913-1915); 21st district (1915-1919)
- In office March 4, 1923 – January 3, 1955
- Preceded by: Harry C. Gahn
- Succeeded by: Charles Vanik
- Constituency: 21st district

Member of the Ohio House of Representatives from the Cuyahoga County district
- In office January 2, 1911 – January 5, 1913 Serving with 9 others
- Preceded by: 11 others
- Succeeded by: 13 others

Personal details
- Born: June 7, 1874 Holytown, Lanarkshire, Scotland
- Died: June 3, 1957 (aged 82) Bethesda, Maryland
- Resting place: Highland Park Cemetery, Warrensville Heights, Ohio
- Party: Democratic
- Spouse: Isabelle Dargarvel Hogg

Robert Crosser (June 7, 1874 – June 3, 1957) was an American lawyer and politician who served 19 terms as a U.S. representative from Ohio. He remains the longest-serving member of the United States House of Representatives from the state of Ohio, serving from 1913 to 1919, then again from 1923 until 1955.

== Life and career ==
Born in Holytown, Lanarkshire, Scotland, Crosser emigrated to the United States in 1881 with his parents and settled in Cleveland, Ohio. He moved to Salineville, Ohio, the same year and attended the public schools. He graduated from Kenyon College, Gambier, Ohio, in 1897. He studied law at Columbia Law School in New York City and graduated from Cincinnati Law School in 1901. He was admitted to the bar in 1901 and commenced practice in Cleveland, Ohio. He taught law at Baldwin-Wallace Law School in 1904 and 1905. He served as member of the State house of representatives in 1911 and 1912. He served as member of the fourth constitutional convention in 1912. At the convention, he was the author of the Initiative and referendum amendment adopted by the voters in 1912.

== Congress ==
Robert Crosser was elected as a Democrat to the Sixty-third, Sixty-fourth, and Sixty-fifth Congresses (March 4, 1913 – March 3, 1919). He served as chairman of the Committee on Expenditures in the Department of Commerce (Sixty-fifth Congress). He was an unsuccessful candidate for renomination in 1918 and for election in 1920.

Crosser was elected to the Sixty-eighth and to the fifteen succeeding Congresses (March 4, 1923 – January 3, 1955). He served as chairman of the Committee on Interstate and Foreign Commerce (Eighty-first and Eighty-second Congresses).

He was an unsuccessful candidate for renomination in 1954. In that race, he was defeated in the primary by Charles Vanik in a field of candidates that also included African-American challenger John Holly, founder of the Negro Future Outlook League.

== Death ==
He resided in Bethesda, Maryland, until his death there on June 3, 1957. He was interred in Highland Park Cemetery, Warrensville, Ohio.

Robert Crosser was married to Isabelle Dargarvel Hogg.

Crosser was a member of Phi Delta Phi.

== Election results ==
| Year | Democratic | Republican | Other |
|---|---|---|---|
| 1952 | Robert Crosser: 100,340 | Lawrence O. Payne: 45,896 | |
| 1950 | Robert Crosser: 66,341 | William Hodge: 21,588 | |
| 1948 | Robert Crosser: 72,417 | Harry W. Mitchell: 22,932 | |
| 1946 | Robert Crosser: 49,111 | James S. Hudee: 27,657 | |
| 1944 | Robert Crosser: 77,525 | Harry C. Gahn: 22,288 | |
| 1942 | Robert Crosser: 35,109 | William J. Rogers: 19,137 | Arnold S. Johnson: 744 |
| 1940 | Robert Crosser: 79,602 | J. E. Chizek: 23,658 | |
| 1938 | Robert Crosser: 53,180 | J. E. Chizek: 24,240 | |
| 1936 | Robert Crosser: 70,596 | Harry C. Gahn: 23,811 | |
| 1934 | Robert Crosser: 47,540 | Frank W. Sotak: 25,253 | E. C. Greenfield (C): 1,684 |
| 1932 | Robert Crosser: 49,436 | Gerard Pilliod: 25,527 | Joseph Schiffer (C): 672; Eugene F. Cheeks: 204 |
| 1930 | Robert Crosser: 30,722 | George H. Bender: 29,081 | Gustave F. Ebding: 96 |
| 1928 | Robert Crosser: 39,090 | Joseph F. Lange: 26,267 | |
| 1926 | Robert Crosser: 17,819 | Harry C. Gahn: 10,733 | |
| 1924 | Robert Crosser: 24,889 | Harry C. Gahn: 21,629 | John Brahtin (W): 272 |
| 1922 | Robert Crosser: 18,645 | Harry C. Gahn: 14,024 | Henry Kuhlman (S): 997; Frank Kalcec (SL): 185 |

== See also ==
- List of United States representatives from Ohio

== Sources ==
- United States Congress. "Robert Crosser (id: C000932)". Biographical Directory of the United States Congress.

U.S. House of Representatives
| Preceded by District inactive | Member of the U.S. House of Representatives from Ohio's at-large congressional district 1913-1915 | Succeeded by District inactive |
| Preceded by Robert J. Bulkley | Member of the U.S. House of Representatives from Ohio's 21st congressional district 1915-1919 | Succeeded by John J. Babka |
| Preceded by Harry C. Gahn | Member of the U.S. House of Representatives from Ohio's 21st congressional district 1923-1955 | Succeeded by Charles Vanik |
