= CMHA =

The acronym CMHA may refer to:

- Canadian Mental Health Association, a national mental health charity
- Community Mental Health Act, a 1963 American law
- Cuyahoga Metropolitan Housing Authority, a public housing agency in Ohio
