= Outhwaite Homes =

Coordinates: 41°29′36″N 81°39′20″W

Outhwaite Homes is a public development under jurisdiction of the Cuyahoga Metropolitan Housing Authority in Cleveland, Ohio. Built in 1935 by architects Edward J. Maier, Travis G. Walsh, and Leo J. Barrett and possibly named after Joseph H. Outhwaite, it was the first federally funded public housing in the Cleveland area and one of the first in the U.S. At the time of its opening, rent was listed at $4.78. The 100-plus-unit complex at East 55th Street and Woodland Avenue is, in autumn of 2011, in the final stages of redevelopment. The Outhwaite Homes, like other housing developments in the CMHA, provides residential housing for low-income families in the eastern section of downtown Cleveland.

== History ==
Two famous Cleveland brothers, Louis Stokes (US Congressman for over 28 years) and Carl Stokes (first black mayor of a major US city 1967) were among the first residents of Outhwaite.

Louis Stokes Museum On September 13, 2007, CMHA opened the Louis Stokes Museum in honor of Cleveland-native Louis Stokes, a former congressman and civil rights attorney. The Louis Stokes Museum, located at CMHA's Outhwaite Homes, displays Stokes memorabilia, video interviews and footage, awards, and a written history about Congressman Louis Stokes and his rise to prominence. Louis and his brother Carl, Cleveland's first black mayor, grew up in the estates. The museum is located at 2453 East 43rd Street, Cleveland, Ohio 44104.

Judge Sara J. Harper Children's Library Judge Sara J. Harper founded the Sara J. Harper Children's Library in 1992 at CMHA's Outhwaite Homes on East 43rd Street. Judge Harper grew up in the estates along with Carl and Louis Stokes. She is the first black woman graduate of the Case Western Reserve University Law School; the first woman to serve on the judiciary of the U.S. Marine Corps Reserve; one of the first two women to win a seat on the Ohio Court of Appeals; and the first black woman to sit by assignment on the Ohio Supreme Court. The mission of the library is to provide a safe environment that encourages and promotes reading, learning, and positive avenues for self-realization. It is located at 2453 East 43rd Street, Cleveland, Ohio 44104.

Construction Details (1935 dollars):
Total Cost: $3,211,727
Land: $742,492
Construction: $2,420,335
Landscaping: $48,900
Construction cost per room (incl. landscaping): $1,139,95

== See also ==
- Public housing in the United States and Canada
