= Louis Stokes Wing =

Coordinates: 41°30′4″N 81°41′30″W

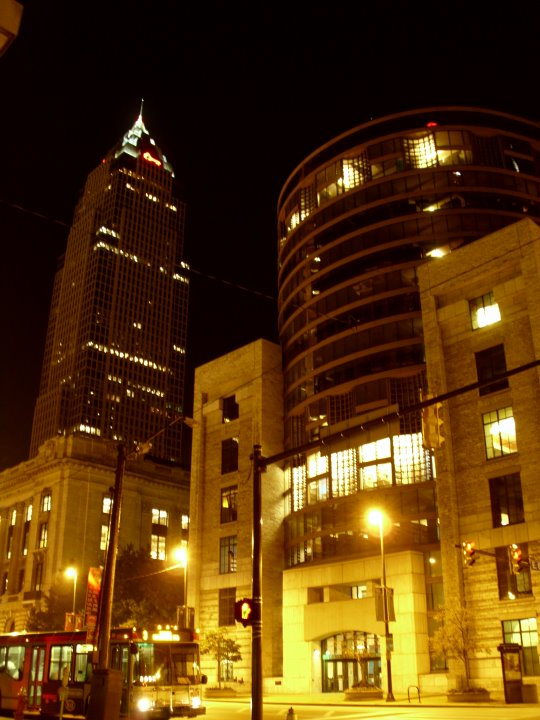
- The Stokes Wing sits in the foreground with the Key Tower in the background
- Interactive map of the Louis Stokes Wing area
- Former names: None

General information
- Type: Academic
- Location: 525 Superior Avenue Cleveland, Ohio 44114 United States
- Construction started: 1994
- Completed: 1998

Height
- Roof: 49.68 m (163 ft)

Technical details
- Floor count: 10

Design and construction
- Architect: URS Consultants

The Louis Stokes Wing is a 1998-erected 163 foot 10-story high-rise addition to the main branch of the 15th largest public library in the country, Cleveland Public Library located in the Civic Center district of downtown Cleveland. So as not to detract from the original Group Plan Main Branch Library building, the Wing was designed to appear as if it were the reincarnation of what the library building would look like if it emerged as a modern updated structure from the classic age of architecture. The Stokes houses the special book storage collections, the audio visual archives (videos, DVDs, CDs, etc.), the children's collections, the circulation desk, and much more for the library system.

The building is named after Louis Stokes, a former US Congressman who served in Ohio's 11th congressional district from 1968-1998.

== See also ==
- Group Plan
- Carnegie library
- List of the largest libraries in the United States
