= General Babka =

General Babka may refer to:

- General Babka (1924 film), an Austrian film directed by Michael Curtiz
- General Babka (1930 film), an Austrian film directed by Dezső Kertész
