= Reserve Square =

Two-building skyscraper mixed use apartment complex in downtown Cleveland, Ohio

Coordinates: 41°30′11.37″N 81°41′5.74″W

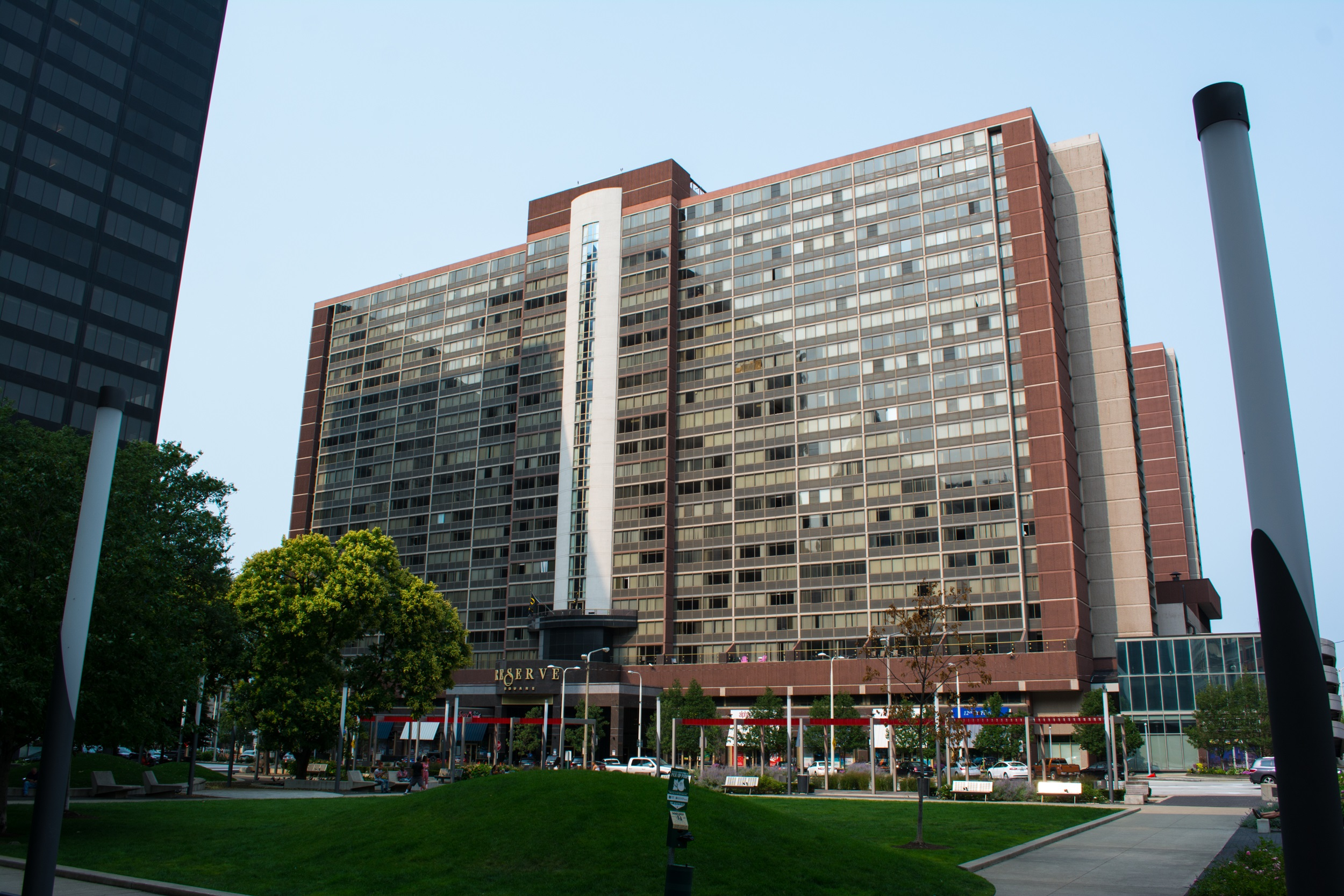
- Front of Reserve Square
- Interactive map of the Reserve Square area

General information
- Type: Residential
- Location: 1700 East 13th Street Cleveland, Ohio 44114 United States
- Construction started: 1971
- Completed: 1973

Height
- Roof: 81.07 m (266 ft)

Technical details
- Floor count: 26

Design and construction
- Architect: Dalton, Dalton, Little, and Newport

Reserve Square is a two-building skyscraper mixed use apartment complex in downtown Cleveland, Ohio, United States. Both buildings have 23 floors and are 266 feet (81 m) high. Reserve Square is directly west of the senior residential Cuyahoga Metropolitan Housing Authority's Bohn Tower.

The complex was originally called Park Centre and was an extension of the Erieview Plan. One of the goals of this plan was to create residential zones in downtown Cleveland, however, by the 1970s with completion of the Tower at Erieview, One Erieview Plaza and Reserve Square this was only partially achieved.

== History ==
Construction of the West Tower began on October 29, 1971, and was completed on October 28, 1972. The East Tower and the whole Park Centre complex was completed in 1973. The first tenants moved in on March 15, 1973. When it opened, inside there was a three level Park Centre Mall that included 15 restaurants, a movie theater, a grocery store, and shopping. The mall area existed from 1973 to 1989.

It was designed by the Cleveland architectural firm Dalton-Dalton-Newport-Little, which at one time was one of the most prominent firms in the world, so much so that in 1984, Dalton was acquired by URS Corp of San Francisco. The exterior design was influenced by Le Corbusier's public housing development Unité d'Habitation, a building notable for its interiors and minimal footprint on the ground. The aesthetic approaches Brutalism with the way it utilizes raw cement features, though it is a bit less refined than that style. In 1979 the Park Centre was renamed to The Park. Briefly in 1985 The Park was charged to The Park on 12th, before being charged back to The Park. In 1989 major renovation begin turning The Park into Reserve Square. Beginning in 1990 The Park was renamed to Reserve Square. Also, in 1990 part of the West Tower contained a Radisson Hotel and then an Embassy Suites Hotel for a number of years, until it closed in 2012 and was converted back to apartments. Cleveland television stations WOIO, WUAB, and WTCL-LD—all owned by Gray Television—have their broadcast studios on the building's first floor. Having moved there in 1994 following WOIO becoming Cleveland's CBS affiliate.

The K & D Group of Willoughby, Ohio purchased the apartment tower for $36 million in August 2005, and purchased the hotel that December for $5.1 million.

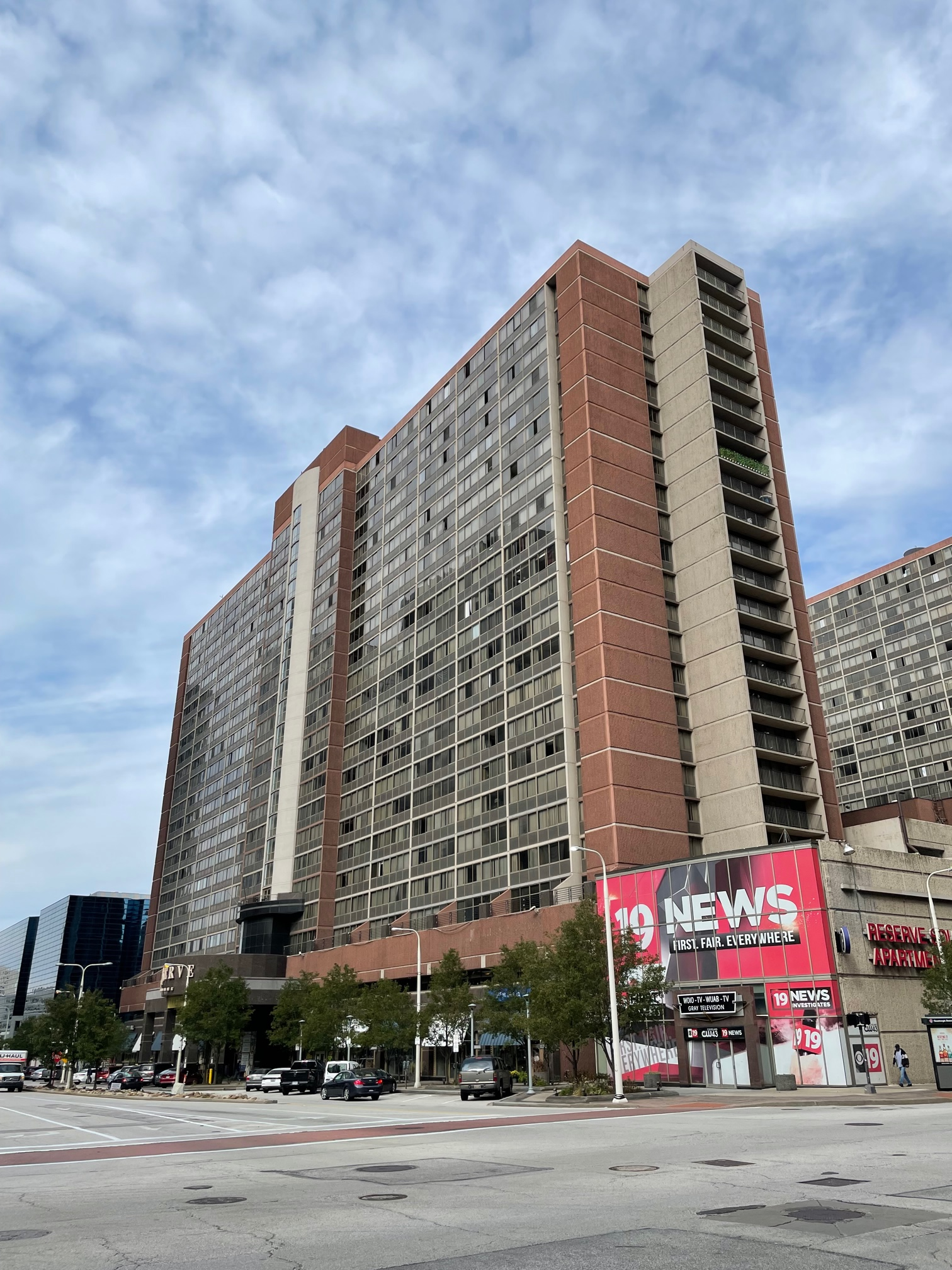
Reserve Square complex 2023

== See also ==
- List of tallest buildings in Cleveland
