= Tremont Pointe =

Valleyview Homes, now Tremont Pointe, was originally built in 1939 in the Tremont neighborhood, overlooking Cleveland's industrial valley. As one of the country's oldest public housing estates, the original design was a World War II barrack style layout with small units lacking contemporary amenities and was separated by 72 vertical steps. In addition, the site was adorned with a large number of Works Progress Administration (WPA) artwork. By 2004, Valleyview Homes had become one of CMHA's most distressed public housing estates, and some of the art was badly damaged.

Cuyahoga Metropolitan Housing Authority, in partnership with City Architecture, redeveloped Tremont Pointe as the first multi-family green development in the State of Ohio under the Enterprise Green Communities Initiative. The project was designed to integrate a previously separated estate into its surrounding community using innovative site planning and design structure.

Green building practices employed in this project have created energy efficient units, easing financial and environmental burdens. Partnering with Intermuseum Conservation Association (ICA) Art Conservation, CMHA preserved, restored and reintroduced the artwork into the new construction.

== Construction ==
Tremont Pointe was a two-phase HOPE VI redevelopment project designed to integrate a previously separated community into its surrounding community using innovative site planning and design structures. One of the first public housing developments, Valleyview Homes, now known as Tremont Pointe, was originally built in 1939. The new, mixed-income development is a 189-unit property.

== Amenities ==
Tremont Pointe has the following green amenities: home energy rating systems, green-label carpet, low volatile paints, formaldehyde-free composite woods, walkable neighborhood with access to transportation and services.

== Recognition ==
Tremont Pointe was selected as a Building of America Award project and was featured as a Gold Medal Winner. It was also recognized with an Award of Excellence by the National Association of Housing and Redevelopment Officials (NAHRO).
