= Bohn Tower =

High-rise public housing in Cleveland, Ohio, United States

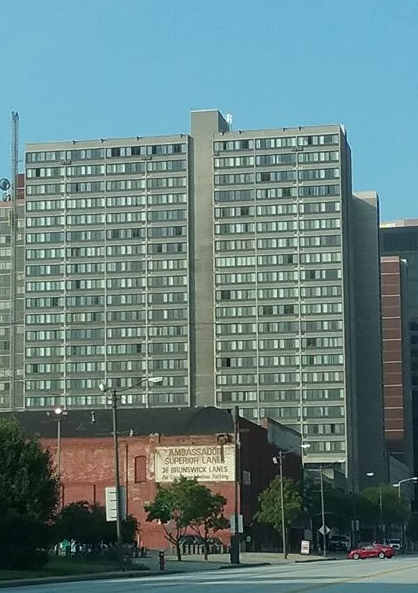
- Interactive map of the Bohn Tower area
- Alternative names: Ernest J. Bohn Tower

General information
- Type: Residential
- Architectural style: Brutalism
- Location: 1300 Superior Avenue Cleveland, Ohio 44115 United States
- Coordinates: 41°30′14″N 81°41′4″W
- Construction started: 1971
- Completed: 1972

Height
- Roof: 204 ft (62 m)

Technical details
- Floor count: 22

Design and construction
- Architecture firm: Dorsky Hodgson & Partners

Other information
- Number of units: 266

Bohn Tower is a 204-foot (62 m)-tall 22-story apartment tower that provides public housing for seniors in downtown Cleveland. It was built in 1972 by the Cuyahoga Metropolitan Housing Authority and named after Ernest J. Bohn, CMHA's founding director. The Brutalist building offers one-bedroom apartments and faces Superior Avenue, directly east of the Reserve Square apartments. A 2016 renovation, funded through federal Low-Income Housing Tax Credits, replaced its mechanical, electrical, and plumbing systems, among other improvements.
