= Harry C. Gahn =

American politician

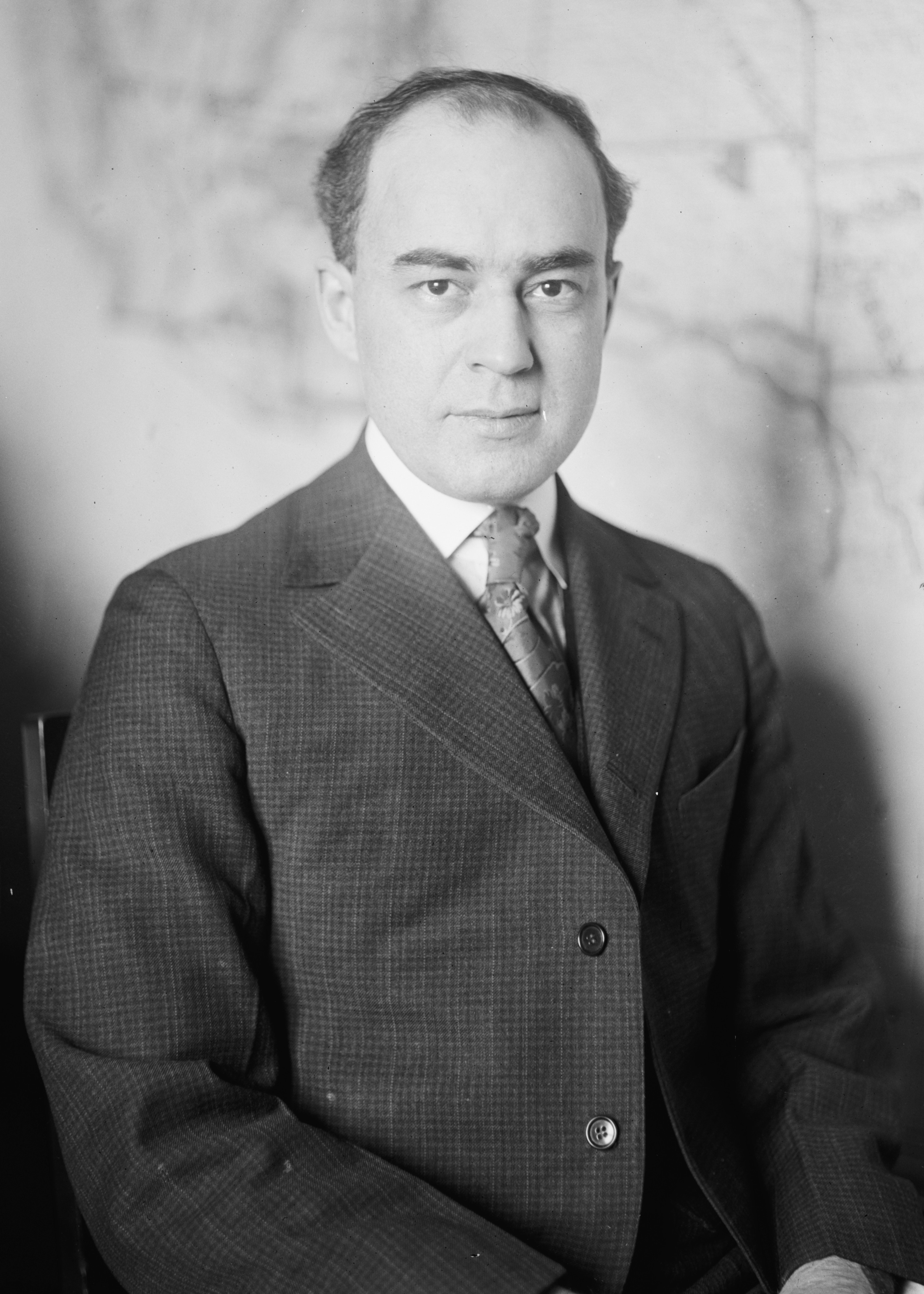

Member of the U.S. House of Representatives from Ohio's 21st district
- In office March 4, 1921 – March 3, 1923
- Preceded by: John J. Babka
- Succeeded by: Robert Crosser

Personal details
- Born: Harry Conrad Gahn; April 26, 1880 Elmore, Ohio
- Died: November 2, 1962 (aged 82) Cleveland, Ohio
- Resting place: Harris-Elmore Union Cemetery, Elmore
- Party: Republican
- Education: University of Michigan Law School

Harry Conrad Gahn (April 26, 1880 – November 2, 1962) was an American lawyer and politician who served one term as a U.S. representative from Ohio from 1921 to 1923.

== Life and career ==
Born in Elmore, Ohio, Gahn attended the public schools. He taught school three years. He was graduated from the law department of the University of Michigan at Ann Arbor in 1904.

He was admitted to the bar and commenced practice in Cleveland, Ohio. Attorney for the Cleveland Legal Aid Society 1909-1911. He served as member of the city council 1910-1921, serving as its president in 1918 and 1919.

He served as member of the Cleveland River and Harbor Commission 1911-1921. Treasurer of the American Association of Port Authorities 1912-1919. He was in charge of Liberty Loan campaigns in his district during the First World War.

=== Congress ===
Gahn was elected as a Republican to the Sixty-seventh Congress (March 4, 1921 – March 3, 1923). He was an unsuccessful candidate for reelection in 1922 to the Sixty-eighth Congress and for election in 1936 to the Seventy-fifth Congress.

=== Later career ===
He resumed the practice of his profession. He served as solicitor for Independence, Ohio from 1936 to 1956.

=== Death and burial ===
He died in Cleveland, Ohio, November 2, 1962. He was interred in the Harris-Elmore Union Cemetery, Elmore, Ottawa County, Ohio.

Gahn was a member of the Masons and Knights of Pythias.

== Sources ==
- United States Congress. "Harry C. Gahn (id: G000004)". Biographical Directory of the United States Congress.

U.S. House of Representatives
Preceded by John J. Babka	Member of the U.S. House of Representatives from Ohio's 21st congressional district 1921-1923	Succeeded by Robert Crosser
