= Francis E. Young =

American civil rights leader (1876–1958)

Francis Elliott Young (28 September 1876 - 1958) was a civil rights leader and union organizer from Cleveland, Ohio.

== Biography ==
He was born on 28 September 1876 in Cleveland, Ohio.

Young helped organize the Cleveland branch of the NAACP and the AFL postal union. He entered politics after retiring as a postal supervisor.

In 1954, he ran for Ohio's 21st congressional district. The district was evenly divided between African Americans, who were solidly Republican, and whites, who were mostly Democrats. After winning a hard-fought Republican primary, the 78-year-old Young lost to Charles Vanik, a judge.

He died in 1958.
