= Fairfax Intergenerational Housing Griot Village =

Housing development in Cleveland, Ohio

Coordinates: 41°29′47.5″N 81°37′52.1″W

Fairfax Intergenerational Housing project, also known as Griot Village, located in Cleveland, Ohio, is a specialized housing development for intergenerational households, the first of its kind in Ohio. The project is designed according to Enterprise Green Community standards for seniors, ages 55 and older, who have legal custody of children.

== History ==
The project, completed in partnership with Fairfax Renaissance Development Corporation (FRDC) in 2014, consists of 40 newly constructed clustered town homes which face a shared courtyard with playgrounds and green space, with the aim of creating a feeling of inclusiveness and promoting interaction. The development consists of eight separate buildings with each building containing five housing units. There are eight two-bedroom units, 31 three-bedroom units, and one four-bedroom flat.

The design of Griot Village was the result of a national design competition in coordination with the Kent State University Urban Design Collaborative. The winning design by Fernando Bonilla of Maryland was intended to create a safe and supportive community with child-friendly outdoor space, indoor space that addressed senior-accessibility needs (universal design), and a community center.

The residents are close to commercial and retail development, within walking distance of the cultural hub of Cleveland, in close proximity to several major medical centers and local schools. Green components were incorporated throughout the design such as Energy-Star appliances and light fixtures.

The residents named the development Griot Village. A ‘griot’ is a storyteller who perpetuates the oral tradition and history of a village or family. There is a community center and computer stations.

Griot Village is a Project-Based Voucher housing estate, a subsidized housing program where Cuyahoga Metropolitan Housing Authority (CMHA) manages and provides rental payment assistance on behalf of low-income families. CMHA hired a Supportive Services Coordinator specifically to serve the new development whereby the families will receive supportive services to address their specific needs. The Coordinator provides intake, assessment, planning, coordination and implementation of community services that support economic development and service activities.

== Awards and recognition ==
Griot Village is the winner of the National Association of Housing and Redevelopment Officials (NAHRO) 2014 Agency Awards of Merit.

The project won the 2014 Developments of Distinction Award: LIHTC Development that Best Exemplifies Major Community Impact given by Novogradac Journal of Tax Credits, which recognized exceptional achievement in the development of properties using the low-income housing tax credit (LIHTC), and/or tax credit developments using U.S. Department of Housing and Urban Development (HUD) financing.

In 2014, the Northeast Ohio Apartment Association (NOAA) recognized Griot Village with the highest award distinction, Platinum.

In April 2015, a production team from the U.S. Department of Health and Human Services visited Griot Village, to tape a video to be shown at the 2015 White House Conference on Aging.

In 2015, the National Association of Industrial and Office Properties (NAIOP) Northern Ohio Chapter recognized City Architecture and CMHA with the Multi-Family Architecture Award of Excellence for their work on Griot Village.
