= General Babka (1924 film) =

1924 film

- Directed by: Michael Curtiz
- Release date: 1924
- Country: Austria

General Babka is a 1924 Austrian film directed by Michael Curtiz.
