= Cuyahoga Metropolitan Housing Authority =

Public housing agency in Ohio, United States

Cuyahoga Metropolitan Housing Authority (CMHA)
Agency overview
- Formed: 1933
- Jurisdiction: Cuyahoga County, Ohio, United States
- Headquarters: 8120 Kinsman Road Cleveland, Ohio, 44104
- Employees: 1000
- Annual budget: $260 million
- Agency executive: Jeffery K. Patterson, Chief Executive Officer
- Parent agency: United States Department of Housing and Urban Development
- Website: cmha.net

The Cuyahoga Metropolitan Housing Authority (CMHA) is a governmental organization responsible for the ownership and management of low-income housing property in Cuyahoga County, Ohio. The organization was founded in 1933, making it the first housing authority in the United States.

== History ==
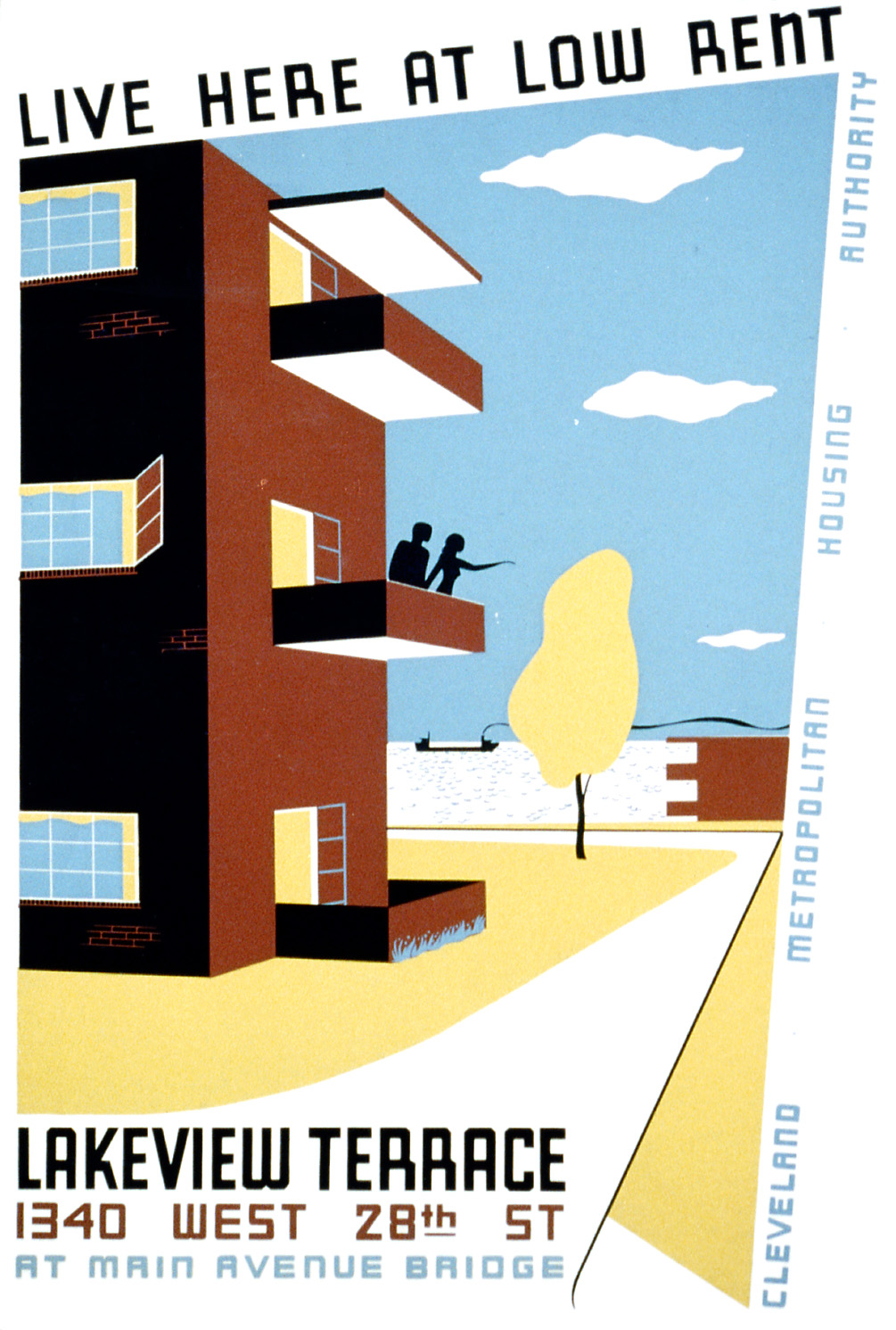
1930s poster promoting Lakeview Terrace

During the 1930s, Cleveland Councilman Ernest J. Bohn, led an effort to create public housing for low-income families. At that time, low income families lived in very poor conditions. Bohn sought out unsafe tumbledown shanties, known as "fire-traps", to replace with improved, affordable housing that struggling families could use to improve their livelihood and progress to home ownership. The first development to break ground was Olde Cedar in the Central neighborhood, becoming the first public housing development in the country and receiving its first occupants in 1937. This development would soon be followed by Lakeview, Outhwaite Homes and Woodhill Homes, all of which are now eligible for designation on the National Register of Historic Places. The first high-rise constructed for public housing was the Cedar Extension High-Rise, built to accommodate seniors. It was first occupied in 1955.

During the 1960s and 70s, in addition to the developments CMHA was building, the organization began acquire existing properties from many different local sources.

Following the establishment of the Section 8 Program with a law enacted by Congress in 1974, subsidies were offered for low income families seeking residency in privately owned housing. CMHA began administering the program at this time.

During the 1990s, CMHA improved safety for the residents of its properties by pioneering the use of defensible space design concepts such as private entryways, exterior lighting, and perimeter fencing. CMHA also opened the first residential substance abuse treatment center in the country—Miracle Village, at Outhwaite Homes. Other notable milestones for CMHA in the 1990s include a primary healthcare clinic and the Carl B. Stokes Social Services Mall, a one-stop shopping facility offering social, health-related, career counseling, and training services. This facility was the first of its kind in the nation.

Judge Sara J. Harper founded the Sara J. Harper Children's Library in 1992 at CMHA's Outhwaite Homes on East 43rd Street. Judge Harper grew up in the estates along with Carl and Louis Stokes. She is the first black woman graduate of the Case Western Reserve University Law School; the first woman to serve on the judiciary of the U.S. Marine Corps Reserve; one of the first two women to win a seat on the Ohio Court of Appeals; and the first black woman to sit by assignment on the Ohio Supreme Court. The mission of the library is to provide a safe environment that encourages and promotes reading, learning, and positive avenues for self-realization. It is located at 2453 East 43rd Street, Cleveland, Ohio 44104.

On September 13, 2007, CMHA opened the Louis Stokes Museum in honor of Cleveland-native Louis Stokes, a former congressman and civil rights attorney. The Louis Stokes Museum, located at CMHA's Outhwaite Homes, displays Stokes memorabilia, video interviews and footage, awards, and a written history about Congressman Louis Stokes and his rise to prominence. Louis and his brother Carl Stokes, Cleveland's first black mayor, grew up in the estates. The museum is located at 2453 East 43rd Street, Cleveland, Ohio 44104.

=== American Recovery and Reinvestment Act (ARRA)–Funded Projects ===
The American Recovery and Reinvestment Act of 2009 (ARRA), commonly referred to as the Stimulus or The Recovery Act, was an economic stimulus package enacted by the 111th United States Congress in February 2009 and signed into law on February 17, 2009, by President Barack Obama.

In 2009, CMHA received more than $35 million in ARRA Formula Grant funds and more than $34 million in ARRA Competitive Grant funds. Using ARRA funding, CMHA was able to complete many projects that had been waiting adequate funding. CMHA used more than $5 million in ARRA formula funds to restore and build a 10,000 sq. ft. addition on to the historic community center at Woodhill Homes Estates, abandoned in the 1980s.

In 2009 and 2010, using about $7 million, CMHA renovated 163 units, common areas, and exteriors at 13 estates to be fully accessible to persons with disabilities. This was part of an existing, large-scale, seven-year project to complete similar renovations across the agency.

CMHA used more than $5 million to build an apartment building designated for senior citizens at Outhwaite Homes; Legacy Park contains 36 units, 10 of which are accessible to persons with disabilities.

Using more than $2 million, CMHA restored 131 abandoned, vacant units at ten estates. CMHA also upgraded an electrical system at Outhwaite Homes to occupy vacant units.

Using more than $2 million, CMHA was able to replace high-rise roofs at Wade Tower, Scranton Castle, Springbrook, and West Boulevard. CMHA also replaced 10 roofs at Olde Cedar and 17 roofs at Outhwaite Homes.

CMHA used formula grant funds totaling $12 million at Phases I and II of Heritage View Homes. Containing a total of 18 single-family-homes, 81 semi-attached townhouses, and a 40 unit apartment building, work on Phase I was completed in early 2011, and Phase II was completed fall 2011.

Additionally, CMHA was able to use more than $17 million to complete Phase III of Heritage View, which consisted of 69 units, 46 semi-attached townhomes and 23 single-family homes. This competitive grant funding focused on green building. Single-family homes in Heritage View Phase III have solar panels on the roofs; permeable pavement is throughout the development to reduce surface water runoff; recycled materials are in the construction; and building envelopes are Energy Star-rated. The National Association of Housing and Redevelopment Officials (NAHRO) recognized the project and it won the Tax Credit Excellence Award in the public housing category for the Charles L. Edson Tax Credit Excellence Awards competition.

CMHA used more than $16 million in ARRA competitive grant funding to perform energy efficiency upgrades at nine sites. Upgrades include lighting and plumbing fixture replacement, window replacement, boiler and hot water heater replacement, and the installation of consumption metering to track and monitor energy use. CMHA continues to see return on investment for these projects in the form of reduced utility bills at these sites.

ARRA funds in these grants were subject to strict deadlines and reporting requirements. CMHA met or exceeded all deadlines, completed all funded projects, and created nearly 1,000 employment opportunities in Northeast Ohio.

=== CMHA Campus Headquarters ===
The CMHA Administrative Headquarters brings together close to 400 CMHA employees from different departments and offices at one centralized site. The 25-acre industrial park is located in Cleveland's Kinsman neighborhood near many of the CMHA public housing developments. The facility encompasses both an administrative building and service building and assists CMHA in providing comprehensive, efficient, services and resources to the residents, clients, and other persons doing business with CMHA. In addition, the location provides convenient access to a variety of modes of transportation.

The three-story office building (74,453 sq. ft.) houses eleven departments. The building's exterior materials consist of fiber cement panels, metal ribbed panels, galvanized metal shingles and aluminum composite panels. A six-acre solar field of 4,200 solar panels, generating 1.1 megawatts of electricity, sits on the site.

The Property Maintenance department is housed at the Service Building (approximately 100 employees). The Service Building (25,318 sq. ft.) is a pre-engineered high bay structure and houses an office area and locker rooms on the first floor with a large meeting room stacked above those areas. The Service Building has automobile repair, workshops for skilled-tradespeople, and a fueling station.

CMHA designed both buildings to meet Silver Certification requirements under Leadership in Energy and Environmental Design (LEED). LEED is a voluntary third-party rating system certification developed by the United States Green Building Coalition (USGBC). Certification consists of a rating system where developers earn credits for implementing sustainable/green criteria.

=== Solar Panel Field ===
CMHA collaborated with Carbon Vision and Cleveland Public Power to conceive of and install a six-acre solar panel field on an unused post-industrial brownfield adjacent to the CMHA administrative Campus, which is LEED Silver Certified. The 1.1 megawatt solar panel field is the largest of its kind in the area. CMHA hosts the solar panel field and is able to buy power produced at a discounted rate. Excess energy goes back into the grid as pure renewable energy.

== Developments ==
=== High rises ===
Contain one and two bedroom apartments.

- Bellaire Garden-A
- Bellaire Garden-B
- Crestview Apts
- Lakeview Tower
- Manhattan Tower
- Mile Elmarge
- Park Denison
- Springbrook
- Union Square
- Wade Apartments
- West Boulevard
- Willson Tower

=== Senior high rises ===
For individual senior living for those ages 50 and over.

- Addison Square
- Ambleside Tower
- Apthorp Tower
- Beachcrest
- Bohn Tower
- Cedar Ext Highrise
- Doris V. Jones Court Senior Building
- Euclid Beach Gardens
- Fairway Manor
- King Kennedy North High Rise
- Laronde Apts
- Lorain Square
- Mount Auburn Manor
- Quarrytown
- Riverview Tower
- Scranton Castle
- Severance Tower
- Union Court

=== Family properties ===
Located throughout Cuyahoga County

- Addison Townhouses
- Bellaire Rd. Apartments
- Bellaire Townhouses
- Carver Park
- Eastside Homes (CHN)
- Fairfax Intergenerational Housing (Griot Village)
- Gordon Square (CHN)
- Harvard Townhouses
- Heritage View
- King Kennedy South
- Lakeview Terrace
- Miles Pointe
- NOAH-East
- Oakwood Gardens
- Olde Cedar
- Outhwaite Homes
- Phoenix Village
- Puritas Gardens
- Riverside Park Homes
- Riverview Family
- Small or Scattered Sites
- Tremont Pointe
- Walton Extension
- Walton-Landon
- Westside Homes (CHN)
- Willson Apartments
- Woodhill Homes
- Woodhill Scattered
- Woodhill Shale
- Woodland-E.115th
- Woody Woods

== CMHA Police Dept ==
Cuyahoga Metropolitan Housing Authority Police Department
- Common name: CMHA Police
- Abbreviation: CMHA
- Motto: TRUST; Tanacity Respect Understanding Service Training

Agency overview
- Formed: 1969
- Employees: 100+
- Annual budget: Variable

Jurisdictional structure
- Operations jurisdiction: Cuyahoga County, Ohio, United States of America
- Area: 457 square miles
- Population: 50,000+ tenants
- Governing body: Cuyahoga County Department of Public Safety & Justice Services
- General nature: Local civilian police

Operational structure
- Headquarters: 5715 Woodland Avenue Cleveland, Ohio 44104
- Sworn members: Police Officers
- Unsworn members: Protection Officers
- Agency executive: Andres Gonzalez, Chief of Police
- Units: 8
- Commands: Administrative Operations/Field Operations

Facilities
- Police Headquarters: 1

Website
- www.cmha.net/safety

CMHA maintains a State of Ohio certified police force responsible for the safety and security of CMHA owned properties. The CMHA Police Department employs OPOTC certified sworn peace officers, OPOTC certified non-sworn security officers, LEADS certified communications officers and a host of other civilian support staff for clerical and technological functions.

=== History ===
In 1969, CMHA stood up an Estate Patrol Unit in charge of housing security. John Carman was hired by CMHA as its first Chief of Security. In 1973, Darlice Olgetree was appointed Chief of Police.

In the 1970s the department increased its size to 60 members and the "Notice To Violator" initiative was created, enabling lease enforcement for CMHA.

The 1980s saw the appointment of Bernard Buckner as Chief of the Safety and Security Division. The Police Department would also see an increase in authority for its officers with new legislation.

In 1985, Ohio House Bill #129 was passed, allowing CMHA to begin hiring Ohio Peace Officer Training Commission "OPOTC" certified sworn peace officers with the same training level and legal capability as city police officers such as the city of Cleveland, formally certifying the CMHA division of safety and security as an official law enforcement agency within the state of Ohio making it a legitimate police department.

During the 1990s Anthony H. Jackson was appointed as Chief of Police and the Department achieved accreditation from the Commission on Accreditation for Law Enforcement Agencies or commonly known as CALEA, becoming the first housing authority police force in the United States to do so. Since the 1990s CMHA-PD has achieved multiple re-accreditations from CALEA showing a high degree of voluntary compliance with professional standards.

In 2002, CMHA-PD moved into its current location at 5715 Woodland Avenue formerly known as the Carr Multi-Purpose Center built in 1974 by the city of Cleveland. The facility is secure, climate controlled, houses all agency functions and is in a better suited location to meet the higher service demands of the central neighborhood estates.

=== Agency Units ===
●Patrol ●K-9 ●Detective ●Crime Suppression ●S.W.A.T. ●Community Policing ●Special Investigations ●Logistics

=== Agency Equipment ===
The CMHA police dept issues police officers, Glock 17 9mm pistols, Benelli 12ga shotguns and, Heckler & Koch UMP45 sub-machine guns for swat use. CMHA police protection officers purchase their own dept approved 9mm duty pistols choosing the, Glock 17, Glock 19 or, Smith & Wesson M&P9. CMHA police issued intermediate weapons include, Monadnock Auto-lock expandable baton, Taser X-26 electronic control device and, OC Mk3 aerosol defense spray and 37mm grenade launcher restricted to swat use for tactical situations and crowd control. Officers provide their own double locking handcuffs and flashlights of their choice for duty use.

In 2013 CMHA police department upgraded to a state of the art Motorola two way radio system that allows for reliable county-wide and multi-agency communication capability.

CMHA-PD supplies all officers within the patrol unit with body armor that meets the latest NIJ safety standards for ballistic protective vests.

Vehicles used by CMHA Police include the, Ford Police Interceptor Sedan for patrol use and the, Ford Police Interceptor Utility for K-9 use. The CMHA police SWAT unit uses a, specialized Mercedes Benz/Dodge Sprinter van for swat unit deployments and other officer transportation needs. CMHA Police detectives use a variety of unmarked vehicles for general duties as well as covert operations. The CMHA police dept also has a number of mountain-style bicycles for police officers to use during the summer season allowing for better access to family estate properties and special community events.
