= John J. Babka =

American politician (1884–1937)

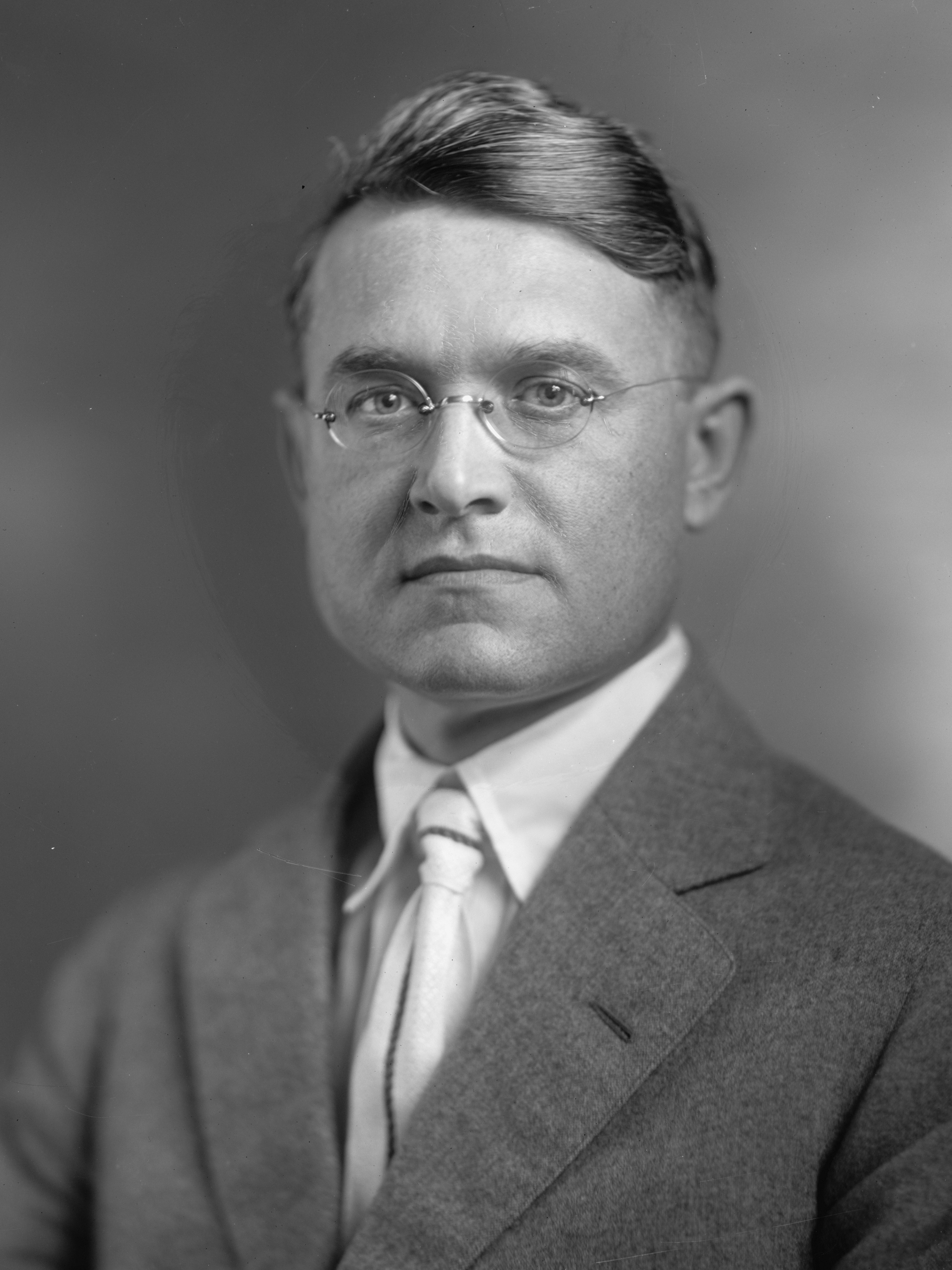

Member of the U.S. House of Representatives from Ohio's 21st district
- In office March 4, 1919 – March 3, 1921
- Preceded by: Robert Crosser
- Succeeded by: Harry C. Gahn

Personal details
- Born: John Joseph Babka; March 11, 1884 Cleveland, Ohio
- Died: March 22, 1937 (aged 53) Cleveland, Ohio
- Resting place: Calvary Cemetery
- Party: Democratic
- Spouse: Marie Kubu
- Education: Cleveland State University College of Law

John Joseph Babka (March 11, 1884 – March 22, 1937) was an American lawyer and politician who served as a Democratic U.S. representative from Ohio for one term from 1919 to 1921.

== Early life and education ==
Babka was born on 11 March 1884 at 68 Douse St, Cleveland, Ohio, to Czech immigrants František Babka, from Kostelec nad Vltavou, and Marie Magdalena, née Kozelková, from Hrejkovice. He reported his birthdate as 16 March 1884. He married Marie Kubu on January 8, 1908. He graduated later that year from the Cleveland Law School.

== Career ==
Babka was admitted to the bar in 1908 and began practicing law in Cleveland. He served as special counsel to the Attorney General of Ohio in 1911 and 1912, and as assistant prosecuting attorney of Cuyahoga County from 1912 to 1919.

=== Congress ===
Babka was elected as a Democrat to the Sixty-sixth Congress (March 4, 1919 – March 3, 1921). He was an unsuccessful candidate for reelection in 1920 to the Sixty-seventh Congress.

He resumed practicing law and served as a delegate to the Democratic National Conventions in 1920 and 1932.

== Death ==
At the time of his death, Babka was serving as a liquidating attorney for the Division of Savings and Loan Associations in the Ohio Department of Commerce.

Babka died in Cleveland on March 22, 1937, and was interred in Calvary Cemetery. He was a member of the B.P.O.E., the Knights of Columbus, and the Loyal Order of Moose.

== Sources ==
- United States Congress. "John J. Babka (id: B000007)". Biographical Directory of the United States Congress.

U.S. House of Representatives
Preceded by Robert Crosser	Member of the U.S. House of Representatives from Ohio's 21st congressional district 1919–1921	Succeeded by Harry C. Gahn
