= Hracholusky (Rakovník District) =

- Municipality
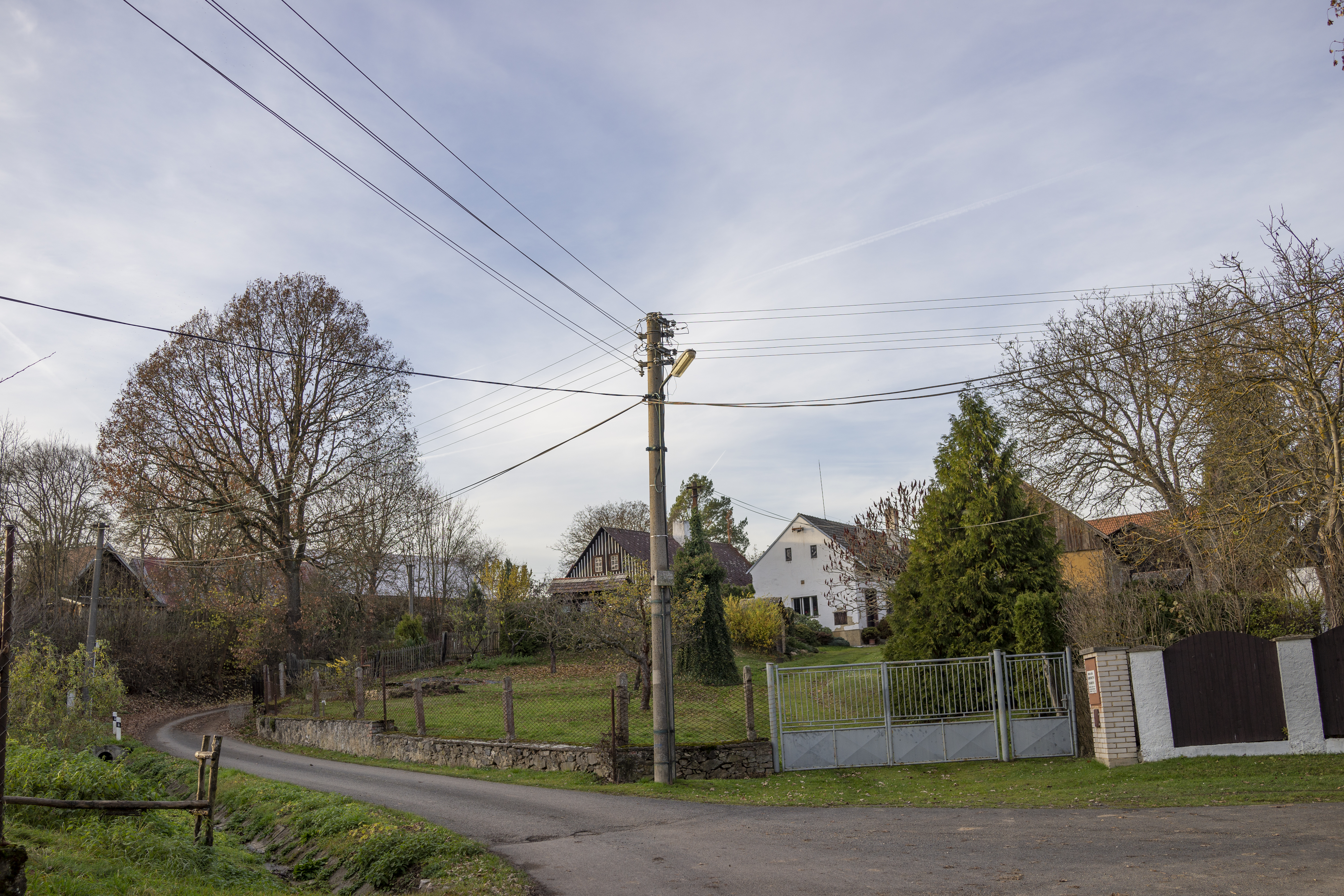
- Houses in Hracholusky

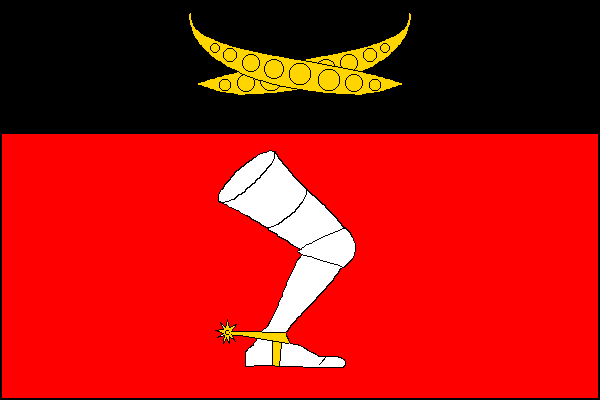
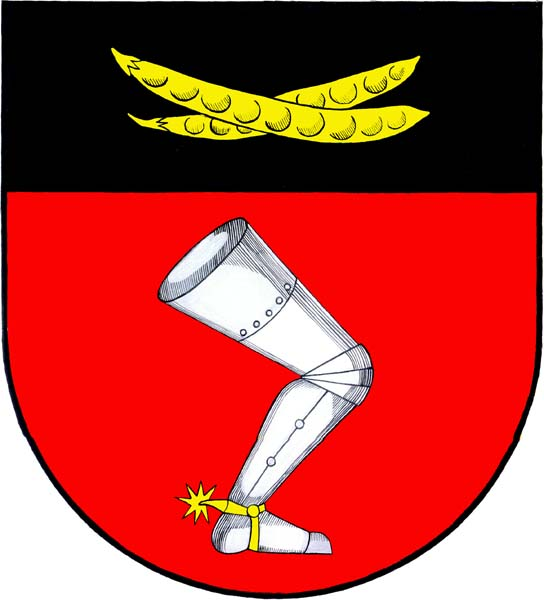
- Flag Coat of arms

- Location in the Czech Republic
- Coordinates: 50°0′11″N 13°46′26″E
- Country: Czech Republic
- Region: Central Bohemian
- District: Rakovník
- First mentioned: 1379

Area
  - Total: 6.83 km^{2} (2.64 sq mi)
- Elevation: 402 m (1,319 ft)

Population (2026-01-01)
  - Total: 73
  - Density: 11/km^{2} (28/sq mi)
- Time zone: UTC+1 (CET)
  - Summer (DST): UTC+2 (CEST)
- Postal code: 270 41
- Website: www.obec-hracholusky.cz

Hracholusky is a municipality and village in Rakovník District in the Central Bohemian Region of the Czech Republic. It has about 70 inhabitants.

== Demographics ==
Historical population
Year	Pop.	±%
1869	352	—
1880	315	−10.5%
1890	279	−11.4%
1900	252	−9.7%
1910	270	+7.1%
1921	250	−7.4%
1930	243	−2.8%
1950	149	−38.7%
1961	161	+8.1%
1970	126	−21.7%
1980	106	−15.9%
1991	70	−34.0%
2001	84	+20.0%
2011	62	−26.2%
2021	69	+11.3%
Source: Censuses
