= Ernest J. Bohn =

American politician

Ernest J. Bohn (1901-15 December 1975) was an American politician. He was a leading figure in public housing from the 1930s until his death. He spent the majority of his life promoting the creation of public housing in Ohio, particularly in Cleveland, and his work created standards copied across the nation. Thanks to his efforts, Cleveland became a leader in public housing, creating the first public housing authority, Cleveland Metropolitan Housing Authority, and creating some of the largest public housing developments in the nation.

== Biography ==
Ernest J. Bohn was born in 1901, in Sannicolaul-Mare, Romania to parents Frank J. and Juliana Bohn. At the age of 10 he immigrated to Cleveland, Ohio with his father. In 1924 he graduated from Adelbert College and in 1926 he graduated from Case Western Reserve Law School. A confirmed Republican, Bohn soon became interested in politics and was elected for the Ohio House of Representatives in 1929, then became a city council representative for the Hough area until 1940. His work in the city council drew Bohn's attention to the problems of The Depression and the slums expanding in Cleveland and other cities across the United States. He was outraged by the state of housing in Hough and other slums, where multiple families crammed into single-family dwellings, sleeping in kitchens and living rooms.

Bohn's conviction to public housing was largely inspired by his Catholic background. He believed in providing charity to the poor, and also believed that changing the environment would change residents' temperaments. Public housing was not only a philanthropy, but also a means to eliminate delinquency, immorality and crime. But the majority perceived public housing as a socialist approach to a problem better left alone, and Bohn had a hard time getting politicians and landlords to hear his views. Bohn drew attention to his cause by launching the study, "The Analysis of a Slum Area in Cleveland" by Father Robert Nevin. The slums of Cleveland's E. 21st street to 55th-Central-Woodland area were the focus of the study, which discovered that the cost of subsidizing residents in the slums cost the city 51 dollars per resident each year. This study was replicated across the nation with similar results and changed how America thought about public housing.

In 1933, Bohn authorized the nation's first public housing authority, the Cleveland Metropolitan Housing Authority (or CMHA, now known as the Cuyahoga Metropolitan Housing Authority). The CMHA authorized the first public housing developments built in Cleveland: Cedar Apartments, Outhwaite Homes, and Lakeview Terrace, which set new advancements in public housing standards. When Bohn was unhappy with the limited resources provided by the government, he worked to change the laws to allow more the CMHA more freedom and responsibility. Thanks to the efforts of Ernest Bohn, Cleveland became the national leader in public housing, pushing for increased development and innovating existing practices. For example, most cities' public housing developments consisted of high-rise apartments that crammed people together. Bohn insisted that Cleveland housing projects were composed of low row-houses that were better suited for families. He did more than build cheap housing, he aspired to create communities.

After World War II, Bohn switched his focus to creating public housing for the elderly. Some of the older public housing units began to deteriorate, and Bohn began receiving criticism for avoiding his obligation to the poor. Projects near the Central and Hough area were accused of destroying more housing than it created, leaving many families with no place to live When Carl B. Stokes (himself a former resident of Outhwaite Homes) was elected mayor in 1968, he forced Ernest Bohn into retirement and decided to reform the public housing system. Bohn taught classes on public housing at Case Western Reserve University until he died in 1975, never having married.
