= Louis Stokes =

American politician (1925–2015)

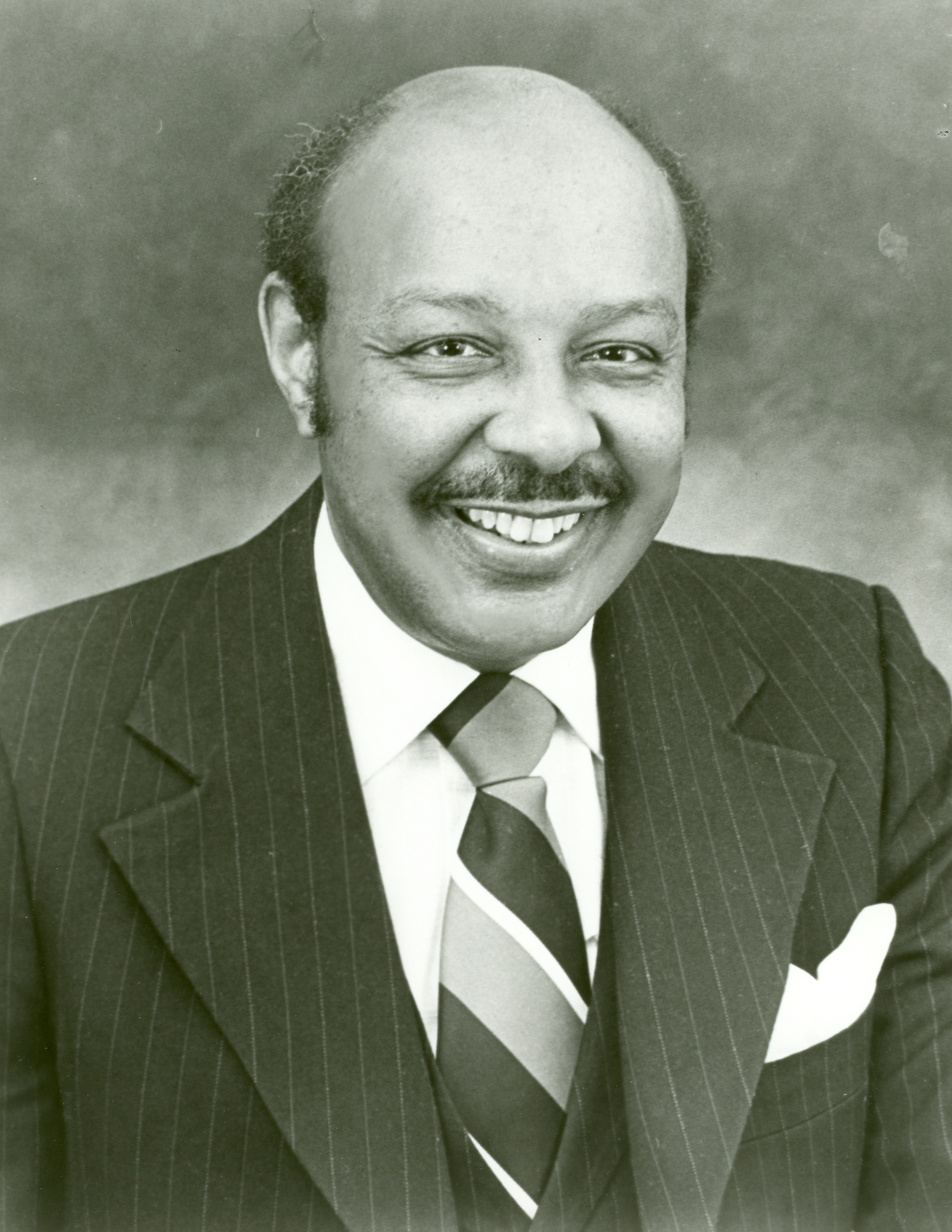

Chair of the House Ethics Committee
- In office January 3, 1991 – January 3, 1993
- Preceded by: Julian Dixon
- Succeeded by: Jim McDermott
- In office January 3, 1981 – January 3, 1985
- Preceded by: Charles Bennett
- Succeeded by: Julian Dixon

Chair of the House Intelligence Committee
- In office January 3, 1987 – January 3, 1989
- Preceded by: Lee Hamilton
- Succeeded by: Anthony Beilenson

Member of the U.S. House of Representatives from Ohio
- In office January 3, 1969 – January 3, 1999
- Preceded by: Charles Vanik
- Succeeded by: Stephanie Tubbs Jones
- Constituency: 21st district (1969–1993); 11th district (1993–1999)

Personal details
- Born: February 23, 1925 Cleveland, Ohio, U.S.
- Died: August 18, 2015 (aged 90) Cleveland, Ohio, U.S.
- Party: Democratic
- Spouse: Jay Stokes
- Children: 4
- Relatives: Carl Stokes (brother)
- Education: Case Western Reserve University (attended); Cleveland State University (JD)

Military service
- Allegiance: United States
- Branch/service: United States Army
- Years of service: 1943–1946
- Battles/wars: World War II
- Stokes's voice Stokes presenting the Congressional Black Caucus's FY1987 budget plan. Recorded May 15, 1986

Louis Stokes (February 23, 1925 – August 18, 2015) was an American attorney, civil rights pioneer and politician. He served 15 terms in the United States House of Representatives – representing the east side of Cleveland – and was the first African American congressman elected in the state of Ohio. He was one of the Cold War era chairmen of the United States House Permanent Select Committee on Intelligence, headed the Congressional Black Caucus, and was the first African American on the United States House Committee on Appropriations.

== Early life ==
Stokes was born in Cleveland, Ohio, the son of Louise (née Stone) and Charles Stokes. He and his brother, politician Carl B. Stokes, lived in one of the first federally funded housing projects, the Outhwaite Homes. Stokes attended Central High School and later served in the U.S. Army from 1943 to 1946. After attending Western Reserve University and the Cleveland State University College of Law on the G.I. Bill, Stokes began practicing law in Cleveland in 1953. He argued the "stop and frisk" case of Terry v. Ohio before the United States Supreme Court in 1968. Later in 1968, he was elected to the House, representing the 21st District of Ohio on Cleveland's East Side. He shifted to the newly created 11th District, covering much of the same area following a 1992 redistricting. Stokes served 30 years in total, retiring in 1999.

== Career ==
Stokes' tenure in the House of Representatives included service on the House Appropriations Committee, where he was influential in bringing revenue to Cleveland. He was particularly interested in veterans' issues and secured funds for health-care facilities for veterans in Cleveland.

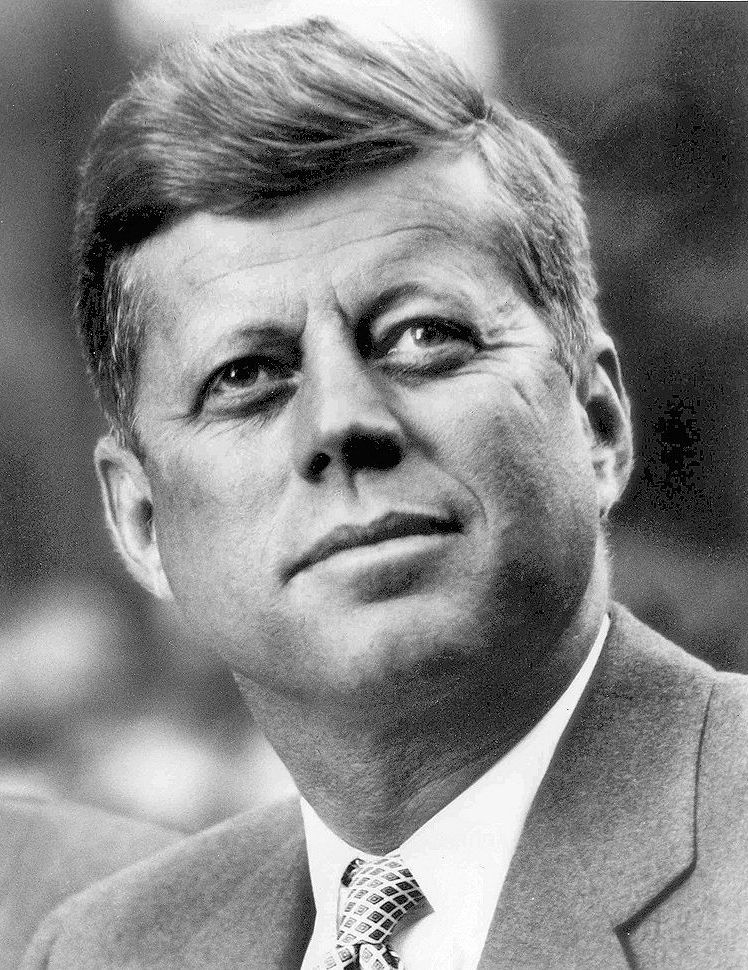
The HSCA investigated the assassinations of John F. Kennedy (left) and Martin Luther King Jr. (right)

In the 1970s, Stokes served as chairman of the United States House Select Committee on Assassinations, charged with investigating the murders of President John F. Kennedy and civil rights leader Martin Luther King Jr. He served on the House committee that investigated the Iran–Contra Affair. As chairman of the United States House Committee on Ethics, Stokes oversaw the committee's investigation of a corruption scandal known as Abscam in 1979–80, which eventually led to convictions of one senator and six House members. Recalling Stokes, U.S. Attorney Steven Dettelbach said: "We were in the midst of a huge ... corruption scandal, and public service was taking a public beating. But Lou Stokes was there as a shining beacon of integrity, of excellence and most important of all for us, of justice."

In 1971, he was a founding member of the Congressional Black Caucus.

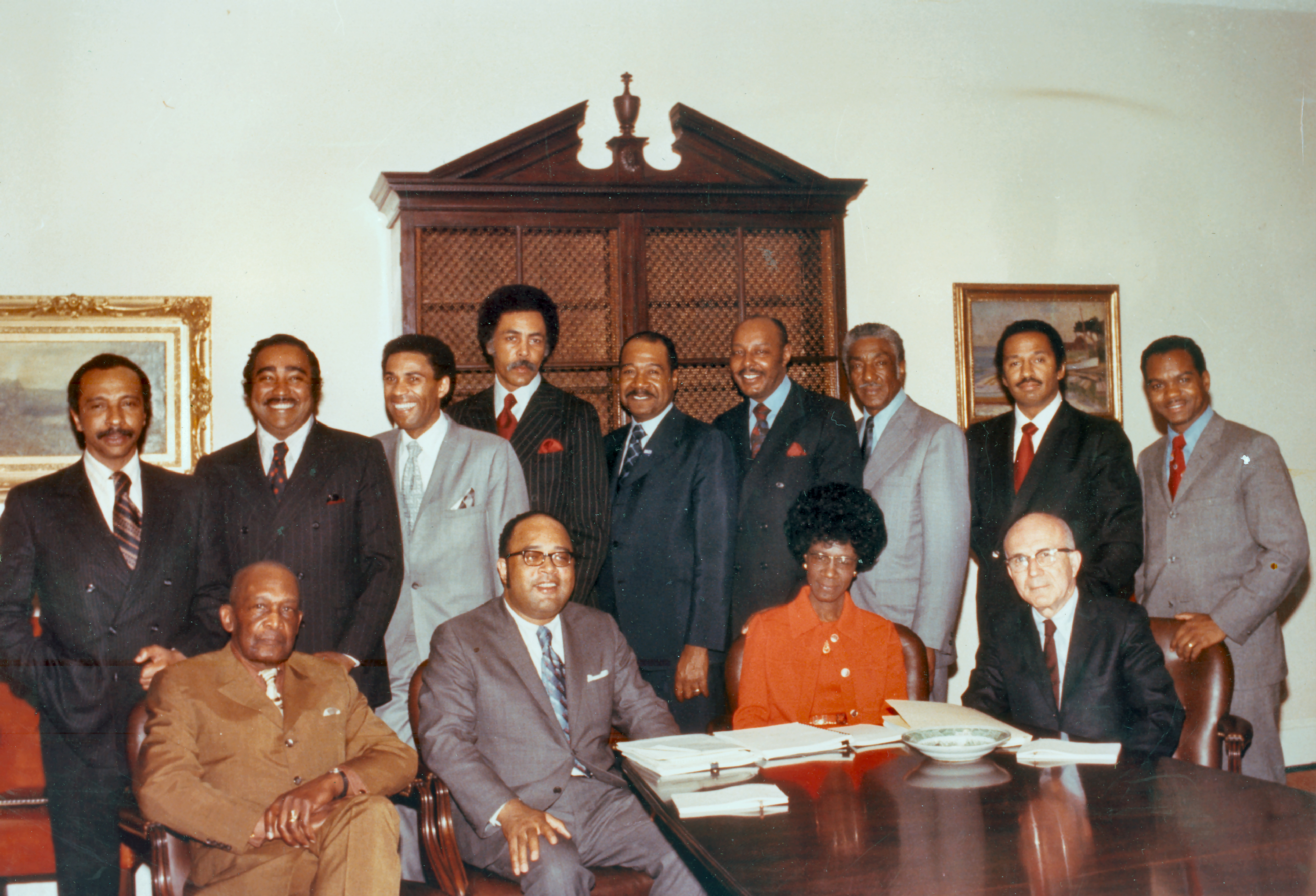
Stokes (standing, fourth from right) with fellow founding members of the Congressional Black Caucus in 1971

In 1992, Stokes ran for president as an Ohio favorite son, winning the delegates from his home district in Ohio, and then, in a minor Democratic convention drama, refused to release the delegate's votes until the Clinton campaign formally asked for them.

Following his time in Congress, Stokes became a distinguished visiting professor at the Jack, Joseph and Morton Mandel School of Applied Social Sciences at Case Western Reserve University. He actively served in this role until the time of his death.

== Personal life ==
Stokes' daughter, Angela, is a former Cleveland Municipal Court judge who served from 1995 through 2015, while another, Lori, was a journalist with WNYW-TV, Fox 5, in New York City; she co-anchored the 5 o'clock and 10 o'clock news and was anchor of the 6 o'clock news until 2022, and earlier co-anchored Good Day New York on the same station. His son Chuck is a journalist with WXYZ-TV in Detroit. His daughter, Shelley, is a historic preservationist, writer and public relations professional. Stokes' brother, Carl B. Stokes, was the first African American mayor of a large American city. Stokes was a cousin of funk and R&B musician Rick James.

Stokes was a Prince Hall Freemason, and a member of the Cleveland Alumni chapter of Kappa Alpha Psi fraternity.

=== Later life and death ===
Stokes retired in 2012 as senior counsel in the law firm of Squire Patton Boggs, with offices in Cleveland and Washington.

On July 20, 2015, it was reported that Stokes had both brain cancer and lung cancer. He died on August 18, 2015, at his home in Cleveland from the diseases at the age of 90. He was interred at Lake View Cemetery in Cleveland.

== Legacy ==
The Cuyahoga Metropolitan Housing Authority opened the Louis Stokes Museum on September 13, 2007. This museum houses Stokes memorabilia, video interviews, miscellaneous video footage, awards and a written history about Stokes and his rise to prominence. The museum is located at Outhwaite Homes, 4302 Quincy Avenue.

From 2006 to 2008, the Western Reserve Historical Society opened an exhibition on the lives of Congressman Stokes and his brother titled "Carl and Louis Stokes: From the Projects to Politics". The exhibit uses photographs, manuscript collections, and personal items to showcase Louis Stokes' rise from the Outhwaite homes, his legal career, and his Congressional service. The former Congressman was inducted into the Karamu House Hall of Fame in 2007 for his contributions to the continued legacy of Cleveland's black settlement house and theatre.

Many buildings throughout the country have been named in Stokes honor including: Howard University's medical library, the Cleveland Public Library's main building expansion, and Greater Cleveland Regional Transit Authority's Windermere station Louis Stokes Station at Windermere. The greater Cleveland area Veteran's hospital was renamed the Louis Stokes Cleveland Department of Veteran Affairs Medical Center. Building 50 on the National Institutes of Health campus is named the Louis Stokes Laboratories.

Congressman Stokes' alma mater, Case Western Reserve University, offers the Louis Stokes Congressional Black Caucus Foundation Scholarship worth full tuition to an incoming first-year or transfer undergraduate student. It is intended to help economically and educationally disadvantaged students attain an education at the school.

== Autobiography ==
- Louis Stokes with David Chanoff (2016): The Gentleman from Ohio. (Foreword by Congressman John Lewis). Trillium Books, The Ohio State University Press. ISBN 978-0-8142-1312-4

== See also ==
- List of African-American United States representatives
- List of Cleveland–Marshall College of Law alumni
- List of members of the House Un-American Activities Committee

U.S. House of Representatives
Preceded by Charles Vanik	Member of the U.S. House of Representatives from Ohio's 21st congressional district 1969–1993	Constituency abolished
Preceded by Charles Diggs	Chair of the Congressional Black Caucus; 1972–1974	Succeeded by Charles Rangel
Preceded by Henry B. González	Chair of the House Assassinations Committee; 1977–1979	Position abolished
Preceded by Charles Bennett	Chair of House Ethics Committee; 1981–1985	Succeeded by Julian Dixon
Preceded by Lee Hamilton	Chair of House Intelligence Committee; 1987–1989	Succeeded by Anthony Beilenson
Preceded by Julian Dixon	Chair of House Ethics Committee; 1991–1993	Succeeded by Jim McDermott
Preceded by Dennis E. Eckart	Member of the U.S. House of Representatives from Ohio's 11th congressional district 1993–1999	Succeeded by Stephanie Tubbs Jones
