= Marie Babka =

American politician

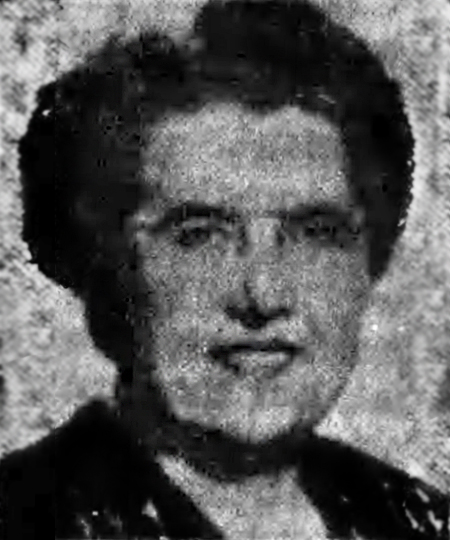

Member of the Ohio House of Representatives from the Cuyahoga County district
- In office 1948 - 1950

Personal details
- Party: Democratic

Marie H. Babka (née Kubu; 17 September 1885 – 20 April 1978) was a former member of the Ohio House of Representatives from Cuyahoga County. She served the House from 1948 to 1950 and was a member of the Electoral College in 1948. She was the wife of John J. Babka.

== Early life ==
Marie Kubu was born on 17 September 1885 at 843 Clark Ave, Cleveland, Ohio, to Czech immigrants Václav Kubů, from Debrník, and Kateřina, née Pencová.
