= Arnold Johnson (activist) =

American communist activist (1904–1989)

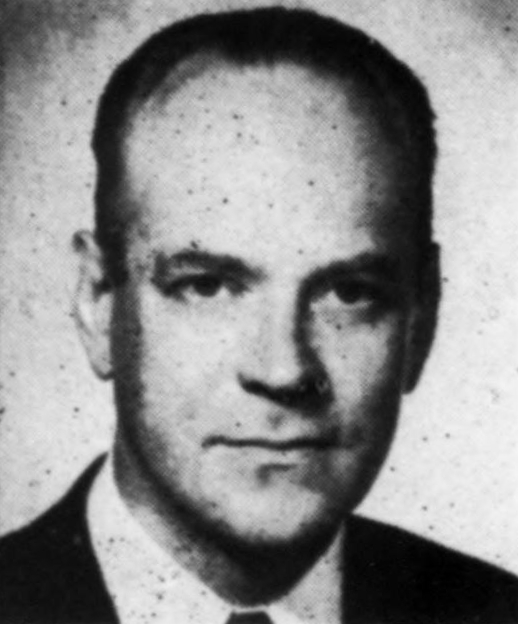
Johnson, c. 1957

Arnold Samuel Johnson (September 23, 1904 – September 26, 1989) was an American activist and Communist Party leader.

== Biography ==
Johnson was born on September 23, 1904, in Seattle, to parents who had immigrated from Sweden and Finland to Minnesota. Johnson joined the Socialist Party in 1929, while studying at Union Theological Seminary. Johnson became politically active in the early 1930s, working with pacifist groups like the Fellowship of Reconciliation. Following the advice of his professor, Harry F. Ward, Johnson traveled to Harlan in 1932 to aid striking miners. Johnson graduated from Union Theological Seminary in 1932 with a bachelor's degree in divinity.

Johnson became a member of the American Workers Party, led by A.J. Muste. In October 1936, Johnson joined the Communist Party, defecting from the Workers Party with Louis Budenz. Johnson and the other departing members opposed the merger of the American Workers Party with the Trotskyist Communist League of America.

In 1940, Johnson was the Communist Party's candidate for governor of Ohio. He was the leader of the Ohio Communist Party between 1940 and 1947. Johnson was arrested in Pittsburgh on June 20, 1951, and charged under the Smith Act with conspiring to overthrow the government. At the time of his arrest, Johnson was serving as the Communist Party's chairman for Western Pennsylvania. On February 3, 1953, Judge Edward J. Dimock found Johnson guilty of violating the Smith Act and sentenced him to three years in prison.

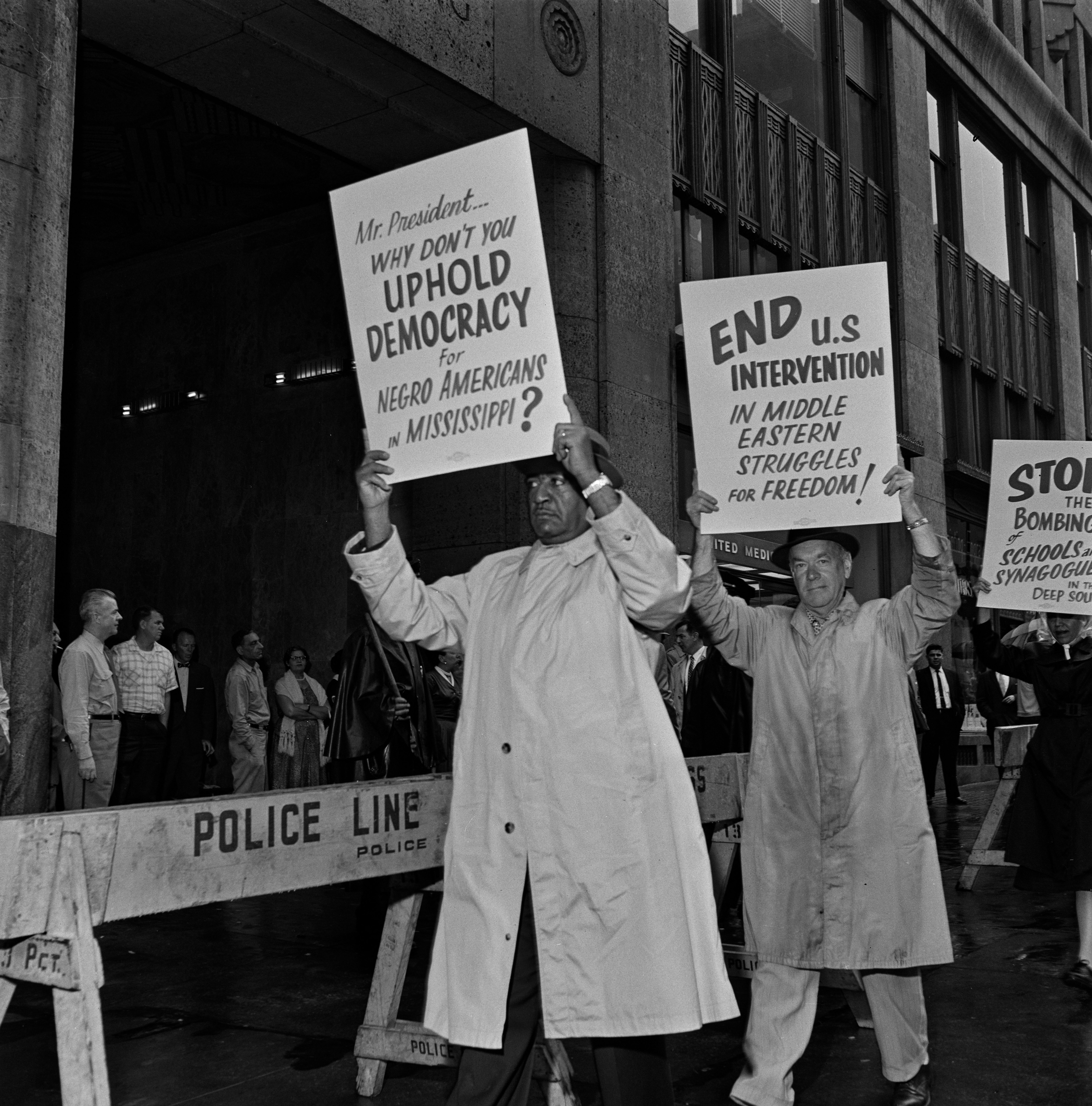
Johnson (right) and Benjamin J. Davis Jr. picket the office of UN Ambassador Henry Cabot Lodge Jr., protesting American intervention in the 1958 Lebanon crisis, July 22, 1958

Johnson represented the Communist Party in discussions about the Independent-Socialist ticket in 1958, but left following disagreements about whether the group should nominate Corliss Lamont as a gubernatorial candidate or support W. Averell Harriman

Johnson exchanged several letters with Lee Harvey Oswald in 1963, after Oswald wrote to the Communist Party asking for political advice. As a result, Johnson provided testimony to the Warren Commission following the Kennedy assassination.

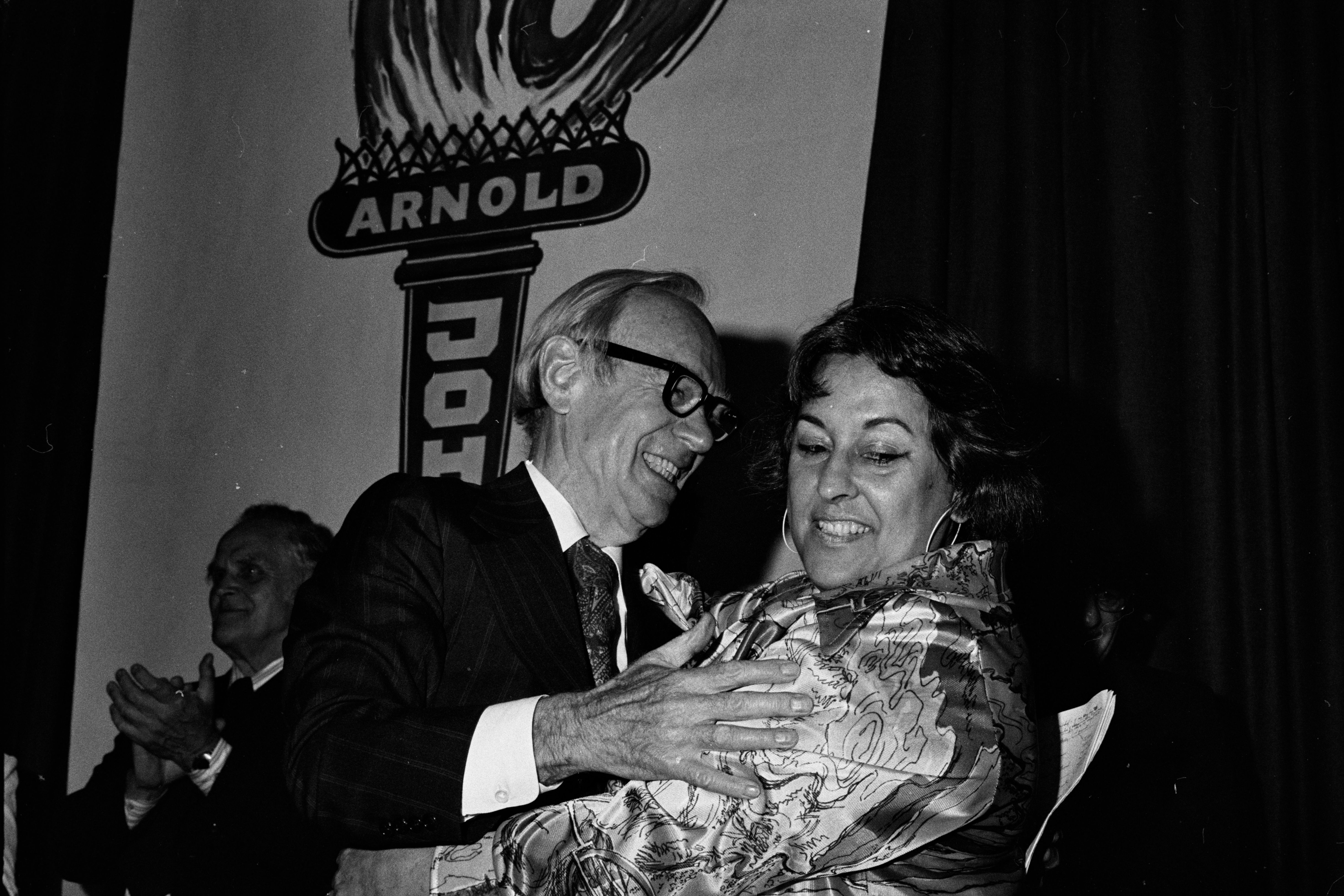
Johnson (left) embraces fellow Communist Grace Mora at a tribute celebrating the 50th anniversary of his political career at the Roosevelt Hotel in Manhattan, New York, June 1, 1974

Johnson was Communist Party's representative on the steering committee of the National Mobilization Committee to End the War in Vietnam. In the spring of 1966, Martin Luther King Jr. demanded that Johnson's name be removed from the letterhead of the Committee because of his Communist views. Due to illness, Johnson abandoned his political work for the Communist Party in 1979.
