= Sara J. Harper =

American lawyer (1926–2025)

Sara J. Harper (August 10, 1926 – July 8, 2025) was an American jurist, lawyer, and member of Ohio's Eighth District Court of Appeals.

== Biography ==
Harper was African-American. She was raised in a public housing project in Cleveland, Ohio. Harper got her undergraduate and law degrees from Case Western Reserve University, and she was the first African-American woman to graduate from Case Western Reserve University Law School

She worked as a prosecutor for the city of Cleveland in the 1960s. In 1970 she was appointed a judge of the Cleveland Municipal Court by Ohio Governor James A. Rhodes, a position to which she was elected for a six-year term in 1971. In 1974 Harper became the first African-American woman and first woman military judge in the history of the Marine Corps Reserve. In 1980 Harper was the Republican Candidate for Chief Justice of Ohio. She also ran for a seat as a justice of the Ohio Supreme Court in 1994. She was president of the Cleveland branch of the NAACP for some of the 1980s. In 1986 Judge Harper retired from the United States Marine Corps judiciary as a Lieutenant Colonel. In 1990 she became a member of the Ohio Court of Appeals. She also co-founded the first victims' rights program in the country.

Harper was a member of Mount Olive Missionary Baptist Church in Cleveland. Her sister, the late Constance "Connie" D. Harper served as the editor in chief of the Call and Post Newspapers.

Harper founded the Sara J. Harper Children’s Library in 1992 at CMHA’s Outhwaite Homes on East 43rd Street. The mission of the library is to provide a safe environment that encourages and promotes reading, learning, and positive avenues for self-realization. It is located at 2453 East 43rd Street, Cleveland, Ohio 44104. (Source: Judge Sara J. Harper Library - Cleveland 101Cleveland 101)

Sara died on July 8, 2025, at the age of 98.
