= Willson Tower =

- Interactive map of the Willson Tower area

General information
- Type: residential
- Location: 1919 East 55th St., Cleveland, Ohio, United States
- Coordinates: 41°30′23.98″N 81°39′5.01″W
- Completed: 1971

Height
- Height: 64.01 m (210 ft)

Technical details
- Floor count: 22

The Willson Tower is a high-rise residential building in Cleveland, Ohio. It is 210 feet tall, and was built in 1971. The building is owned by the Cuyahoga Metropolitan Housing Authority and provides public housing one and two-bedroom apartments. It is named after Hiram Willson, a prominent lawyer in Cleveland in the 19th century. The Willson is on East 55th Street near Cleveland's East Technical High School.
