= Hracholusky (Prachatice District) =

- Municipality
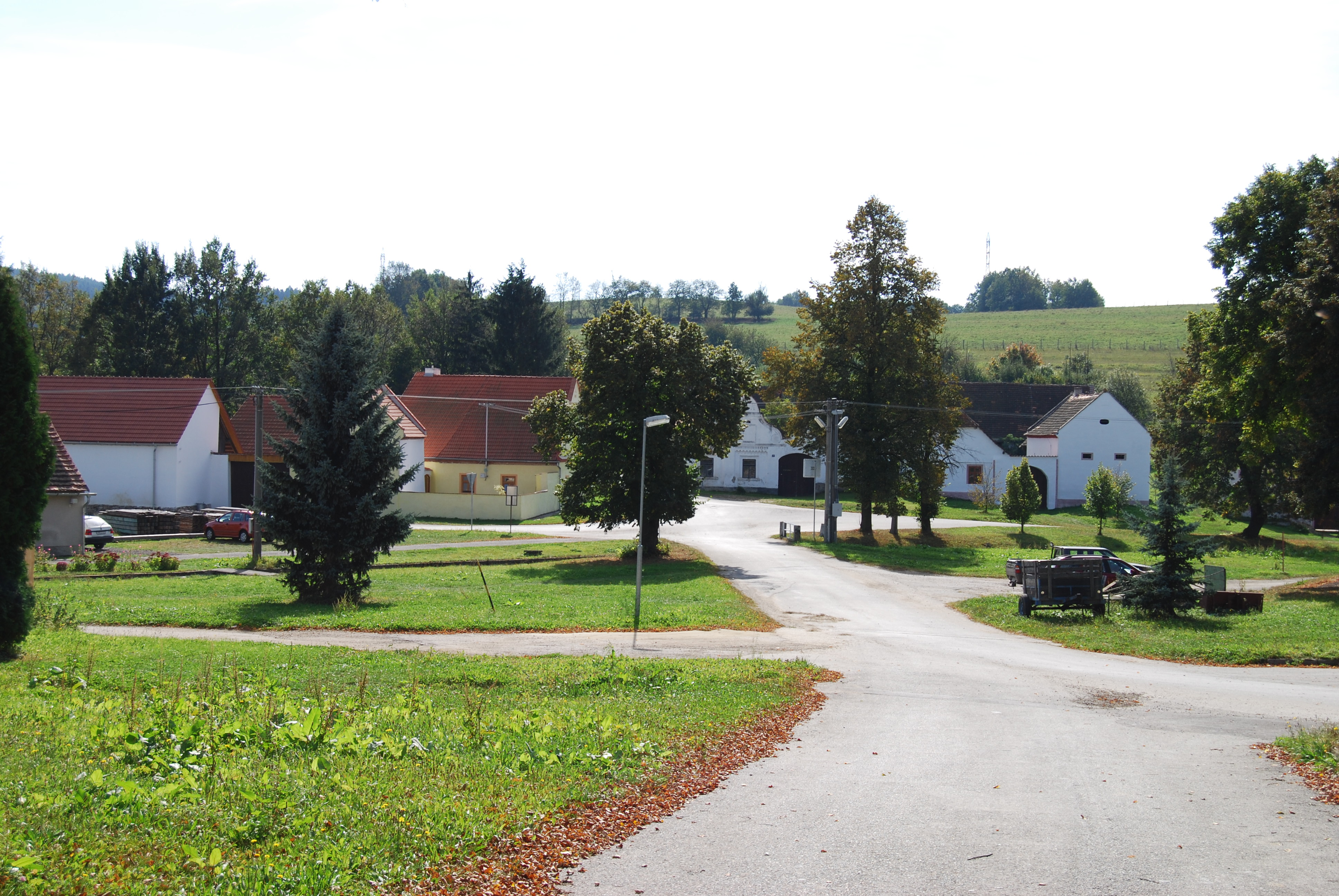
- Centre of Hracholusky

- Location in the Czech Republic
- Coordinates: 49°3′32″N 14°5′19″E
- Country: Czech Republic
- Region: South Bohemian
- District: Prachatice
- First mentioned: 1334

Area
  - Total: 21.36 km^{2} (8.25 sq mi)
- Elevation: 496 m (1,627 ft)

Population (2026-01-01)
  - Total: 487
  - Density: 22.8/km^{2} (59.1/sq mi)
- Time zone: UTC+1 (CET)
  - Summer (DST): UTC+2 (CEST)
- Postal codes: 383 01, 384 11
- Website: www.hracholusky-pt.cz

Hracholusky is a municipality and village in Prachatice District in the South Bohemian Region of the Czech Republic. It has about 500 inhabitants.

Hracholusky lies approximately 9 kilometres (6 mi) north-east of Prachatice, 29 km (18 mi) west of České Budějovice, and 117 km (73 mi) south of Prague.

== Administrative division ==
Hracholusky consists of four municipal parts (in brackets population according to the 2021 census):

- Hracholusky (289)
- Obora (80)
- Vrbice (34)
- Žitná (75)

== Demographics ==
Historical population
Year	Pop.	±%
1869	1,214	—
1880	1,269	+4.5%
1890	1,149	−9.5%
1900	1,147	−0.2%
1910	1,137	−0.9%
1921	1,128	−0.8%
1930	987	−12.5%
1950	619	−37.3%
1961	541	−12.6%
1970	527	−2.6%
1980	454	−13.9%
1991	465	+2.4%
2001	500	+7.5%
2011	456	−8.8%
2021	478	+4.8%
Source: Censuses
