= William Woodworth =

William Woodworth may refer to:

- William W. Woodworth (1807–1873), U.S. Representative from New York
- William Woodworth (inventor) (1780–1839), inventor of the Woodworth Planing Machine
