= List of former United States representatives (T) =

This is a complete list of former United States representatives whose last names begin with the letter T.

== Number of years and terms the member has served ==
The number of years the representative/delegate has served in Congress indicates the number of terms the representative/delegate has. Note the representative/delegate can also serve non-consecutive terms if the representative/delegate loses election and wins re-election to the House.

- 2 years - 1 or 2 terms
- 4 years - 2 or 3 terms
- 6 years - 3 or 4 terms
- 8 years - 4 or 5 terms
- 10 years - 5 or 6 terms
- 12 years - 6 or 7 terms
- 14 years - 7 or 8 terms
- 16 years - 8 or 9 terms
- 18 years - 9 or 10 terms
- 20 years - 10 or 11 terms
- 22 years - 11 or 12 terms
- 24 years - 12 or 13 terms
- 26 years - 13 or 14 terms
- 28 years - 14 or 15 terms
- 30 years - 15 or 16 terms
- 32 years - 16 or 17 terms
- 34 years - 17 or 18 terms
- 36 years - 18 or 19 terms
- 38 years - 19 or 20 terms
- 40 years - 20 or 21 terms
- 42 years - 21 or 22 terms
- 44 years - 22 or 23 terms
- 46 years - 23 or 24 terms
- 48 years - 24 or 25 terms
- 50 years - 25 or 26 terms
- 52 years - 26 or 27 terms
- 54 years - 27 or 28 terms
- 56 years - 28 or 29 terms
- 58 years - 29 or 30 terms

| Name | Term | State/ Territory | Party | Lifespan |
|---|---|---|---|---|
| John Taber | 1923–1963 | New York | Republican | 1880–1965 |
| Stephen Taber | 1865–1869 | New York | Democratic | 1821–1886 |
| Thomas Taber II | 1828–1829 | New York | Democratic | 1785–1862 |
| Boyd Anderson Tackett | 1949–1953 | Arkansas | Democratic | 1911–1985 |
| John Taffe | 1867–1873 | Nebraska | Republican | 1827–1884 |
| Charles Phelps Taft | 1895–1897 | Ohio | Republican | 1843–1929 |
| Robert Taft Jr. | 1963–1965; 1967–1971 | Ohio | Republican | 1917–1993 |
| Joseph Taggart | 1911–1917 | Kansas | Democratic | 1867–1938 |
| Samuel Taggart | 1803–1817 | Massachusetts | Federalist | 1754–1825 |
| Peter Francis Tague | 1915–1919; 1919–1925 | Massachusetts | Democratic | 1871–1941 |
| Mark Takai | 2015–2016 | Hawaii | Democratic | 1967–2016 |
| W. Jasper Talbert | 1893–1903 | South Carolina | Democratic | 1846–1931 |
| Joseph E. Talbot | 1942–1947 | Connecticut | Republican | 1901–1966 |
| Silas Talbot | 1793–1795 | New York | Pro-Administration | 1751–1813 |
| Albert G. Talbott | 1855–1859 | Kentucky | Democratic | 1808–1887 |
| Joshua Frederick Cockey Talbott | 1879–1885; 1893–1895; 1903–1918 | Maryland | Democratic | 1843–1918 |
| Burt Talcott | 1963–1977 | California | Republican | 1920–2016 |
| Charles A. Talcott | 1911–1915 | New York | Democratic | 1857–1920 |
| Jim Talent | 1993–2001 | Missouri | Republican | 1956–present |
| Benjamin Taliaferro | 1799–1801 | Georgia | Federalist | 1750–1821 |
| Benjamin Taliaferro | 1801–1802 | Georgia | Democratic-Republican | 1750–1821 |
| John Taliaferro | 1801–1803; 1811–1813; 1824–1825 | Virginia | Democratic-Republican | 1768–1852 |
| John Taliaferro | 1825–1831; 1835–1837 | Virginia | National Republican | 1768–1852 |
| John Taliaferro | 1837–1843 | Virginia | Whig | 1768–1852 |
| Henry O. Talle | 1939–1959 | Iowa | Republican | 1892–1969 |
| Benjamin Tallmadge | 1801–1817 | Connecticut | Federalist | 1754–1835 |
| Frederick A. Tallmadge | 1847–1849 | New York | Whig | 1792–1869 |
| James Tallmadge Jr. | 1817–1819 | New York | Democratic-Republican | 1778–1853 |
| Peleg Tallman | 1811–1813 | Massachusetts | Democratic-Republican | 1764–1840 |
| Robin Tallon | 1983–1993 | South Carolina | Democratic | 1946–present |
| Tom Tancredo | 1999–2009 | Colorado | Republican | 1945–present |
| Adamson Tannehill | 1813–1815 | Pennsylvania | Democratic-Republican | 1750–1820 |
| Adolphus H. Tanner | 1869–1871 | New York | Republican | 1833–1882 |
| John Tanner | 1989–2011 | Tennessee | Democratic | 1944–present |
| Mason Tappan | 1855–1857 | New Hampshire | American | 1817–1886 |
| Mason Tappan | 1857–1861 | New Hampshire | Republican | 1817–1886 |
| John K. Tarbox | 1875–1877 | Massachusetts | Democratic | 1838–1887 |
| Christian Tarr | 1817–1821 | Pennsylvania | Democratic-Republican | 1765–1833 |
| John Charles Tarsney | 1889–1896 | Missouri | Democratic | 1845–1920 |
| Timothy E. Tarsney | 1885–1889 | Michigan | Democratic | 1849–1909 |
| Malcolm C. Tarver | 1927–1947 | Georgia | Democratic | 1885–1960 |
| Farish Carter Tate | 1893–1905 | Georgia | Democratic | 1856–1922 |
| Magnus Tate | 1815–1817 | Virginia | Federalist | 1760–1823 |
| Randy Tate | 1995–1997 | Washington | Republican | 1965–present |
| Charles Tatgenhorst Jr. | 1927–1929 | Ohio | Republican | 1883–1961 |
| Absalom Tatom | 1795–1796 | North Carolina | Democratic-Republican | 1742–1802 |
| Edward Fenwick Tattnall | 1821–1825 | Georgia | Democratic-Republican | 1788–1832 |
| Edward Fenwick Tattnall | 1825–1827 | Georgia | Democratic | 1788–1832 |
| Tom Tauke | 1979–1991 | Iowa | Republican | 1950–present |
| Micah Taul | 1815–1817 | Kentucky | Democratic-Republican | 1785–1850 |
| William P. Taulbee | 1885–1889 | Kentucky | Democratic | 1851–1890 |
| Anthony F. Tauriello | 1949–1951 | New York | Democratic | 1899–1983 |
| Ellen Tauscher | 1997–2009 | California | Democratic | 1951–2019 |
| Billy Tauzin | 1980–1995 | Louisiana | Democratic | 1943–present |
| Billy Tauzin | 1995–2005 | Louisiana | Republican | 1943–present |
| Clyde Howard Tavenner | 1913–1917 | Illinois | Democratic | 1882–1942 |
| James Albertus Tawney | 1893–1911 | Minnesota | Republican | 1855–1919 |
| Robert Walker Tayler | 1895–1903 | Ohio | Republican | 1852–1910 |
| Abner Taylor | 1889–1893 | Illinois | Republican | 1829–1903 |
| Alexander Wilson Taylor | 1873–1875 | Pennsylvania | Republican | 1815–1893 |
| Alfred A. Taylor | 1889–1895 | Tennessee | Republican | 1848–1931 |
| Arthur H. Taylor | 1893–1895 | Indiana | Democratic | 1852–1922 |
| Benjamin I. Taylor | 1913–1915 | New York | Democratic | 1877–1946 |
| Caleb Newbold Taylor | 1867–1869; 1870–1871 | Pennsylvania | Republican | 1813–1887 |
| Charles Taylor | 1991–2007 | North Carolina | Republican | 1941–present |
| Chester W. Taylor | 1921–1923 | Arkansas | Democratic | 1883–1931 |
| Dean P. Taylor | 1943–1961 | New York | Republican | 1902–1977 |
| Edward L. Taylor Jr. | 1905–1913 | Ohio | Republican | 1869–1938 |
| Edward T. Taylor | 1909–1941 | Colorado | Democratic | 1858–1941 |
| Ezra B. Taylor | 1880–1893 | Ohio | Republican | 1823–1912 |
| Gene Taylor | 1989–2011 | Mississippi | Democratic | 1953–present |
| Gene Taylor | 1973–1989 | Missouri | Republican | 1928–1998 |
| George Taylor | 1857–1859 | New York | Democratic | 1820–1894 |
| George W. Taylor | 1897–1915 | Alabama | Democratic | 1849–1932 |
| Herbert W. Taylor | 1921–1923; 1925–1927 | New Jersey | Republican | 1869–1931 |
| Isaac H. Taylor | 1885–1887 | Ohio | Republican | 1840–1936 |
| J. Alfred Taylor | 1923–1927 | West Virginia | Democratic | 1878-1956 |
| J. Will Taylor | 1919–1939 | Tennessee | Republican | 1880–1939 |
| John Taylor | 1807–1810 | South Carolina | Democratic-Republican | 1770–1832 |
| John Taylor | 1815–1817 | South Carolina | Democratic-Republican | N/A |
| John C. Taylor | 1933–1939 | South Carolina | Democratic | 1890–1983 |
| John J. Taylor | 1853–1855 | New York | Democratic | 1808–1892 |
| John L. Taylor | 1847–1855 | Ohio | Whig | 1805–1870 |
| John May Taylor | 1883–1887 | Tennessee | Democratic | 1838–1911 |
| John W. Taylor | 1813–1825 | New York | Democratic-Republican | 1784–1854 |
| John W. Taylor | 1825–1833 | New York | National Republican | 1784–1854 |
| Jonathan Taylor | 1839–1841 | Ohio | Democratic | 1796–1848 |
| Joseph D. Taylor | 1883–1885; 1887–1893 | Ohio | Republican | 1830–1899 |
| Miles Taylor | 1855–1861 | Louisiana | Democratic | 1805–1873 |
| Nathaniel Green Taylor | 1854–1855 | Tennessee | Whig | 1819–1887 |
| Nathaniel Green Taylor | 1866–1867 | Tennessee | Unionist | 1819–1887 |
| Nelson Taylor | 1865–1867 | New York | Democratic | 1821–1894 |
| Robert Taylor | 1825–1827 | Virginia | National Republican | 1763–1845 |
| Robert Love Taylor | 1879–1881 | Tennessee | Democratic | 1850–1912 |
| Roy A. Taylor | 1960–1977 | North Carolina | Democratic | 1910–1995 |
| Samuel M. Taylor | 1913–1921 | Arkansas | Democratic | 1852–1921 |
| Scott Taylor | 2017–2019 | Virginia | Republican | 1979–present |
| Van Taylor | 2019–2023 | Texas | Republican | 1972–present |
| Vincent A. Taylor | 1891–1893 | Ohio | Republican | 1845–1922 |
| William Taylor | 1833–1839 | New York | Democratic | 1791–1865 |
| William Taylor | 1843–1846 | Virginia | Democratic | 1788–1846 |
| William P. Taylor | 1833–1835 | Virginia | National Republican | N/A |
| Zachary Taylor | 1885–1887 | Tennessee | Republican | 1849–1921 |
| Littleton Waller Tazewell | 1800–1801 | Virginia | Democratic-Republican | 1774–1860 |
| Charles M. Teague | 1955–1974 | California | Republican | 1909–1974 |
| Harry Teague | 2009–2011 | New Mexico | Democratic | 1949–present |
| Olin E. Teague | 1946–1978 | Texas | Democratic | 1910–1981 |
| Frederick Halstead Teese | 1875–1877 | New Jersey | Democratic | 1823–1894 |
| Henry Teigan | 1937–1939 | Minnesota | Farmer-Labor | 1881–1941 |
| Frank Tejeda | 1993–1997 | Texas | Democratic | 1945–1997 |
| Thomas Telfair | 1813–1817 | Georgia | Democratic-Republican | 1780–1818 |
| Isaac Teller | 1854–1855 | New York | Whig | 1799–1868 |
| Ludwig Teller | 1957–1961 | New York | Democratic | 1911–1965 |
| Henry Wilson Temple | 1913–1915 | Pennsylvania | Progressive | 1864–1955 |
| Henry Wilson Temple | 1915–1933 | Pennsylvania | Republican | 1864–1955 |
| William Temple | 1863 | Delaware | Democratic | 1814–1863 |
| Thomas W. Templeton | 1917–1919 | Pennsylvania | Republican | 1867–1935 |
| Egbert Ten Eyck | 1823–1825 | New York | Democratic-Republican | 1779–1844 |
| Egbert Ten Eyck | 1825 | New York | Democratic | 1779–1844 |
| Peter G. Ten Eyck | 1913–1915; 1921–1923 | New York | Democratic | 1873–1944 |
| John K. Tener | 1909–1911 | Pennsylvania | Republican | 1863–1946 |
| Rudolph G. Tenerowicz | 1939–1943 | Michigan | Democratic | 1890–1963 |
| Samuel Tenney | 1800–1807 | New Hampshire | Federalist | 1748–1816 |
| Herbert Tenzer | 1965–1969 | New York | Democratic | 1905–1993 |
| George B. Terrell | 1933–1935 | Texas | Democratic | 1862–1947 |
| James C. Terrell | 1835 | Georgia | Democratic | 1806–1835 |
| William Terrell | 1817–1821 | Georgia | Democratic-Republican | 1778–1855 |
| David D. Terry | 1933–1943 | Arkansas | Democratic | 1881–1963 |
| John H. Terry | 1971–1973 | New York | Republican | 1924–2001 |
| Lee Terry | 1999–2015 | Nebraska | Republican | 1962–present |
| Nathaniel Terry | 1817–1819 | Connecticut | Federalist | 1768-1844 |
| William Terry | 1871–1873; 1875–1877 | Virginia | Democratic | 1824–1888 |
| William L. Terry | 1891–1901 | Arkansas | Democratic | 1850–1917 |
| John Test | 1823–1825 | Indiana | Democratic-Republican | 1771–1849 |
| John Test | 1825–1827; 1829–1831 | Indiana | National Republican | 1771–1849 |
| Donald Edgar Tewes | 1957–1959 | Wisconsin | Republican | 1916–2012 |
| Thomas Chandler Thacher | 1913–1915 | Massachusetts | Democratic | 1858–1945 |
| George Thatcher | 1789–1795 | Massachusetts | Pro-Administration | 1754–1824 |
| George Thatcher | 1795–1801 | Massachusetts | Federalist | 1754–1824 |
| Maurice Thatcher | 1923–1933 | Kentucky | Republican | 1870–1973 |
| Samuel Thatcher | 1802–1805 | Massachusetts | Federalist | 1776–1872 |
| Andrew J. Thayer | 1861 | Oregon | Democratic | 1818–1873 |
| Eli Thayer | 1857–1861 | Massachusetts | Republican | 1819–1899 |
| Harry Irving Thayer | 1925–1926 | Massachusetts | Republican | 1869–1926 |
| John A. Thayer | 1911–1913 | Massachusetts | Democratic | 1857–1917 |
| John R. Thayer | 1899–1905 | Massachusetts | Democratic | 1845–1916 |
| Martin Russell Thayer | 1863–1867 | Pennsylvania | Republican | 1819–1906 |
| Thomas Clarke Theaker | 1859–1861 | Ohio | Republican | 1812–1883 |
| Bannon Goforth Thibodeaux | 1845–1849 | Louisiana | Democratic | 1812–1866 |
| Lewis D. Thill | 1939–1943 | Wisconsin | Republican | 1903–1975 |
| Napoleon B. Thistlewood | 1908–1913 | Illinois | Republican | 1837–1915 |
| William R. Thom | 1933–1939; 1941–1943; 1945–1947 | Ohio | Democratic | 1885–1960 |
| Albert Thomas | 1937–1966 | Texas | Democratic | 1898–1966 |
| Benjamin Thomas | 1861–1863 | Massachusetts | Unionist | 1813–1878 |
| Bill Thomas | 1979–2007 | California | Republican | 1941–present |
| Charles R. Thomas | 1871–1875 | North Carolina | Republican | 1827–1891 |
| Charles R. Thomas | 1899–1911 | North Carolina | Democratic | 1861–1931 |
| Christopher Thomas | 1874–1875 | Virginia | Republican | 1818–1879 |
| Craig L. Thomas | 1989–1995 | Wyoming | Republican | 1933–2007 |
| David Thomas | 1801–1808 | New York | Democratic-Republican | 1762–1831 |
| Elmer Thomas | 1923–1927 | Oklahoma | Democratic | 1876-1965 |
| Francis Thomas | 1831–1841 | Maryland | Democratic | 1799-1876 |
| Francis Thomas | 1861–1863 | Maryland | Unionist | 1799-1876 |
| Francis Thomas | 1863–1867 | Maryland | Unconditional Unionist | 1799-1876 |
| Francis Thomas | 1867–1869 | Maryland | Republican | 1799-1876 |
| George M. Thomas | 1887–1889 | Kentucky | Republican | 1828-1914 |
| Henry F. Thomas | 1893–1897 | Michigan | Republican | 1843-1912 |
| Isaac Thomas | 1815–1817 | Tennessee | Democratic-Republican | 1784-1859 |
| J. Parnell Thomas | 1937–1950 | New Jersey | Republican | 1895-1970 |
| James Houston Thomas | 1847–1851; 1859–1861 | Tennessee | Democratic | 1808-1876 |
| Jesse B. Thomas | 1808–1809 | Indiana | Democratic-Republican | 1777–1853 |
| John Chew Thomas | 1799–1801 | Maryland | Federalist | 1764–1836 |
| John Lewis Thomas Jr. | 1865–1867 | Maryland | Unconditional Unionist | 1835–1893 |
| John R. Thomas | 1879–1889 | Illinois | Republican | 1846–1914 |
| Lera Millard Thomas | 1966–1967 | Texas | Democratic | 1900–1993 |
| Lindsay Thomas | 1983–1993 | Georgia | Democratic | 1943–present |
| Lot Thomas | 1899–1905 | Iowa | Republican | 1843–1905 |
| Ormsby B. Thomas | 1885–1891 | Wisconsin | Republican | 1832–1904 |
| Philemon Thomas | 1831–1835 | Louisiana | Democratic | 1763–1847 |
| Philip Thomas | 1839–1841; 1875–1877 | Maryland | Democratic | 1810–1890 |
| Richard Thomas | 1795–1801 | Pennsylvania | Federalist | 1744–1832 |
| Robert Y. Thomas Jr. | 1909–1925 | Kentucky | Democratic | 1855–1925 |
| W. Aubrey Thomas | 1904–1911 | Ohio | Republican | 1866–1951 |
| William D. Thomas | 1934–1936 | New York | Republican | 1880–1936 |
| R. Ewing Thomason | 1931–1947 | Texas | Democratic | 1879–1973 |
| William Thomasson | 1843–1847 | Kentucky | Whig | 1797–1882 |
| Albert C. Thompson | 1885–1891 | Ohio | Republican | 1842–1910 |
| Benjamin Thompson | 1845–1847; 1851–1852 | Massachusetts | Whig | 1798–1852 |
| Charles J. Thompson | 1919–1931 | Ohio | Republican | 1862–1932 |
| Charles Perkins Thompson | 1875–1877 | Massachusetts | Democratic | 1827–1894 |
| Charles Winston Thompson | 1901–1904 | Alabama | Democratic | 1860–1904 |
| Chester C. Thompson | 1933–1939 | Illinois | Democratic | 1893–1971 |
| Clark W. Thompson | 1933–1935; 1947–1966 | Texas | Democratic | 1896–1981 |
| Fletcher Thompson | 1967–1973 | Georgia | Republican | 1925–2022 |
| Frank Thompson | 1955–1980 | New Jersey | Democratic | 1918–1989 |
| George W. Thompson | 1851–1852 | Virginia | Democratic | 1806–1888 |
| Hedge Thompson | 1827–1828 | New Jersey | National Republican | 1780–1828 |
| Jacob Thompson | 1839–1851 | Mississippi | Democratic | 1810–1885 |
| James Thompson | 1845–1851 | Pennsylvania | Democratic | 1806–1874 |
| Joel Thompson | 1813–1815 | New York | Federalist | 1760–1843 |
| John Thompson | 1799–1801; 1807–1811 | New York | Democratic-Republican | 1749–1823 |
| John Thompson | 1857–1859 | New York | Republican | 1809–1890 |
| John Burton Thompson | 1840–1843; 1847–1851 | Kentucky | Whig | 1810–1874 |
| John McCandless Thompson | 1874–1875; 1877–1879 | Pennsylvania | Republican | 1829–1903 |
| Joseph Bryan Thompson | 1913–1919 | Oklahoma | Democratic | 1871–1919 |
| Philip Thompson | 1823–1825 | Kentucky | Democratic-Republican | 1789–1836 |
| Philip B. Thompson Jr. | 1879–1885 | Kentucky | Democratic | 1845–1909 |
| Philip R. Thompson | 1801–1807 | Virginia | Democratic-Republican | 1766–1837 |
| Richard W. Thompson | 1841–1843; 1847–1849 | Indiana | Whig | 1809–1900 |
| Robert A. Thompson | 1847–1849 | Virginia | Democratic | 1805–1876 |
| Ruth Thompson | 1951–1957 | Michigan | Republican | 1887–1970 |
| T. Ashton Thompson | 1953–1965 | Louisiana | Democratic | 1916–1965 |
| Thomas Larkin Thompson | 1887–1889 | California | Democratic | 1838–1898 |
| Thomas W. Thompson | 1805–1807 | New Hampshire | Federalist | 1766–1821 |
| Waddy Thompson Jr. | 1835–1837 | South Carolina | National Republican | 1798–1868 |
| Waddy Thompson Jr. | 1837–1841 | South Carolina | Whig | 1798–1868 |
| Wiley Thompson | 1821–1825 | Georgia | Democratic-Republican | 1781–1835 |
| Wiley Thompson | 1825–1833 | Georgia | Democratic | 1781–1835 |
| William Thompson | 1847–1850 | Iowa | Democratic | 1813–1897 |
| William George Thompson | 1879–1883 | Iowa | Republican | 1830–1911 |
| Alexander Thomson | 1824–1825 | Pennsylvania | Democratic-Republican | 1788–1848 |
| Alexander Thomson | 1825–1826 | Pennsylvania | Democratic | 1788–1848 |
| Charles M. Thomson | 1913–1915 | Illinois | Progressive | 1877–1943 |
| Keith Thomson | 1955–1960 | Wyoming | Republican | 1919–1960 |
| John Thomson | 1825–1827; 1829–1837 | Ohio | Democratic | 1780-1852 |
| Mark Thomson | 1795–1799 | New Jersey | Federalist | 1739-1803 |
| Vernon Wallace Thomson | 1961–1974 | Wisconsin | Republican | 1905–1988 |
| Charles Thone | 1971–1979 | Nebraska | Republican | 1924–2018 |
| James Thorington | 1855–1857 | Iowa | Oppositionist | 1816–1887 |
| Jacob Thorkelson | 1939–1941 | Montana | Republican | 1876–1945 |
| Homer Thornberry | 1949–1963 | Texas | Democratic | 1909–1995 |
| Mac Thornberry | 1995–2021 | Texas | Republican | 1958–present |
| Jacob Montgomery Thornburgh | 1873–1879 | Tennessee | Republican | 1837–1890 |
| Anthony Thornton | 1865–1867 | Illinois | Democratic | 1814–1904 |
| Ray Thornton | 1973–1979; 1991–1997 | Arkansas | Democratic | 1928–2016 |
| Robert Taylor Thorp | 1896–1897; 1898–1899 | Virginia | Republican | 1850–1938 |
| Roy H. Thorpe | 1922–1923 | Nebraska | Republican | 1874–1951 |
| James W. Throckmorton | 1875–1879; 1883–1887 | Texas | Democratic | 1825–1894 |
| Enos T. Throop | 1815–1816 | New York | Democratic-Republican | 1784-1874 |
| Joseph Earlston Thropp | 1899–1901 | Pennsylvania | Republican | 1847–1927 |
| John Thune | 1997–2003 | South Dakota | Republican | 1961–present |
| Allen G. Thurman | 1845–1847 | Ohio | Democratic | 1813–1895 |
| John R. Thurman | 1849–1851 | New York | Whig | 1814–1854 |
| Karen Thurman | 1993–2003 | Florida | Democratic | 1951–present |
| Benjamin Babock Thurston | 1847–1849; 1851–1855 | Rhode Island | Democratic | 1804–1886 |
| Benjamin Babock Thurston | 1855–1857 | Rhode Island | American | 1804–1886 |
| Lloyd Thurston | 1925–1939 | Iowa | Republican | 1880–1970 |
| Samuel Thurston | 1849–1851 | Oregon | Democratic | 1816–1851 |
| Todd Tiahrt | 1995–2011 | Kansas | Republican | 1951–present |
| John W. Tibbatts | 1843–1847 | Kentucky | Democratic | 1802–1852 |
| George Tibbits | 1803–1805 | New York | Federalist | 1763–1849 |
| Harve Tibbott | 1939–1949 | Pennsylvania | Republican | 1885–1969 |
| Pat Tiberi | 2001–2018 | Ohio | Republican | 1962–present |
| Robert Tiernan | 1967–1975 | Rhode Island | Democratic | 1929–2014 |
| John F. Tierney | 1997–2015 | Massachusetts | Democratic | 1951–present |
| William L. Tierney | 1931–1933 | Connecticut | Democratic | 1876–1958 |
| Nelson Tift | 1868–1869 | Georgia | Democratic | 1810–1891 |
| Daniel R. Tilden | 1843–1847 | Ohio | Whig | 1804–1890 |
| Joseph L. Tillinghast | 1837–1843 | Rhode Island | Whig | 1790–1844 |
| Thomas Tillinghast | 1797–1799 | Rhode Island | Federalist | 1742–1821 |
| Thomas Tillinghast | 1801–1803 | Rhode Island | Democratic-Republican | 1742–1821 |
| George D. Tillman | 1879–1882; 1883–1893 | South Carolina | Democratic | 1826–1902 |
| John N. Tillman | 1915–1929 | Arkansas | Democratic | 1859–1929 |
| Lewis Tillman | 1869–1871 | Tennessee | Republican | 1816–1886 |
| Thomas Tillotson | 1801 | New York | Democratic-Republican | 1750–1832 |
| John Q. Tilson | 1909–1913; 1915–1932 | Connecticut | Republican | 1866–1958 |
| Charles B. Timberlake | 1915–1933 | Colorado | Republican | 1854–1941 |
| Jasper N. Tincher | 1919–1927 | Kansas | Republican | 1878–1951 |
| George H. Tinkham | 1915–1943 | Massachusetts | Republican | 1870–1956 |
| Scott Tipton | 2011–2021 | Colorado | Republican | 1956–present |
| Thomas F. Tipton | 1877–1879 | Illinois | Republican | 1833–1904 |
| Charles Q. Tirrell | 1901–1910 | Massachusetts | Republican | 1844–1910 |
| Obadiah Titus | 1837–1839 | New York | Democratic | 1789–1854 |
| Charles W. Tobey | 1933–1939 | New Hampshire | Republican | 1880–1953 |
| John Tod | 1821–1824 | Pennsylvania | Democratic-Republican | 1779–1830 |
| Albert M. Todd | 1897–1899 | Michigan | Democratic | 1850–1931 |
| John Blair Smith Todd | 1861–1863; 1864–1865 | Dakota | Democratic | 1814–1872 |
| Lemuel Todd | 1855–1857 | Pennsylvania | Oppositionist | 1817–1891 |
| Lemuel Todd | 1873–1875 | Pennsylvania | Republican | 1817–1891 |
| Paul H. Todd Jr. | 1965–1967 | Michigan | Democratic | 1921–2008 |
| John H. Tolan | 1935–1947 | California | Democratic | 1877–1947 |
| George Washington Toland | 1837–1843 | Pennsylvania | Whig | 1796–1869 |
| Herman Toll | 1959–1967 | Pennsylvania | Democratic | 1907–1967 |
| Thor C. Tollefson | 1947–1965 | Washington | Republican | 1901–1982 |
| Harold S. Tolley | 1925–1927 | New York | Republican | 1894–1956 |
| Gideon Tomlinson | 1819–1825 | Connecticut | Democratic-Republican | 1780–1854 |
| Gideon Tomlinson | 1825–1827 | Connecticut | National Republican | 1780–1854 |
| Thomas A. Tomlinson | 1841–1843 | New York | Whig | 1802–1872 |
| Arthur S. Tompkins | 1899–1903 | New York | Republican | 1865–1938 |
| Caleb Tompkins | 1817–1821 | New York | Democratic-Republican | 1759–1846 |
| Christopher Tompkins | 1831–1835 | Kentucky | National Republican | 1780–1858 |
| Cydnor B. Tompkins | 1857–1861 | Ohio | Republican | 1810–1862 |
| Emmett Tompkins | 1901–1903 | Ohio | Republican | 1853–1917 |
| Patrick W. Tompkins | 1847–1849 | Mississippi | Whig | 1804–1853 |
| Thomas H. Tongue | 1897–1903 | Oregon | Republican | 1844–1903 |
| Richard A. Tonry | 1977 | Louisiana | Democratic | 1935–2012 |
| Richard J. Tonry | 1935–1937 | New York | Democratic | 1893–1971 |
| Joseph Toole | 1885–1889 | Montana | Democratic | 1851–1929 |
| Robert Toombs | 1845–1853 | Georgia | Whig | 1810–1885 |
| Pat Toomey | 1999–2005 | Pennsylvania | Republican | 1961–present |
| Peter G. Torkildsen | 1993–1997 | Massachusetts | Republican | 1958–present |
| James H. Torrens | 1944–1947 | New York | Democratic | 1874–1952 |
| Esteban Torres | 1983–1999 | California | Democratic | 1930–2022 |
| Xochitl Torres Small | 2019–2021 | New Mexico | Democratic | 1984–present |
| Robert Torricelli | 1983–1997 | New Jersey | Democratic | 1951–present |
| William E. Tou Velle | 1907–1911 | Ohio | Democratic | 1862–1951 |
| Isaac Toucey | 1835–1839 | Connecticut | Democratic | 1792–1869 |
| Harry Lancaster Towe | 1943–1951 | New Jersey | Republican | 1898–1991 |
| David Towell | 1973–1975 | Nevada | Republican | 1937–2003 |
| Frank William Towey Jr. | 1937–1939 | New Jersey | Democratic | 1895–1979 |
| Charles A. Towne | 1895–1897 | Minnesota | Republican | 1858–1928 |
| Charles A. Towne | 1905–1907 | New York | Democratic | 1858–1928 |
| Horace Mann Towner | 1911–1923 | Iowa | Republican | 1855–1937 |
| Edolphus Towns | 1983–2013 | New York | Democratic | 1934–present |
| George W. Towns | 1835–1836; 1837–1839; 1846–1847 | Georgia | Democratic | 1801–1854 |
| Amos Townsend | 1877–1883 | Ohio | Republican | 1821–1895 |
| Charles Champlain Townsend | 1889–1891 | Pennsylvania | Republican | 1841–1910 |
| Charles E. Townsend | 1903–1911 | Michigan | Republican | 1856–1924 |
| Dwight Townsend | 1864–1865; 1871–1873 | New York | Democratic | 1826–1899 |
| Edward W. Townsend | 1911–1915 | New Jersey | Democratic | 1855–1942 |
| George Townsend | 1815–1819 | New York | Democratic-Republican | 1769–1844 |
| Hosea Townsend | 1889–1893 | Colorado | Republican | 1840–1909 |
| Martin I. Townsend | 1875–1879 | New York | Republican | 1810–1903 |
| Washington Townsend | 1869–1877 | Pennsylvania | Republican | 1813–1894 |
| Norton Strange Townshend | 1851–1853 | Ohio | Democratic | 1815–1895 |
| Richard W. Townshend | 1877–1889 | Illinois | Democratic | 1840–1889 |
| Robert J. Tracewell | 1895–1897 | Indiana | Republican | 1852–1922 |
| Charles Tracey | 1887–1895 | New York | Democratic | 1847–1905 |
| John P. Tracey | 1895–1897 | Missouri | Republican | 1836–1910 |
| Albert H. Tracy | 1819–1821 | New York | Federalist | 1793–1859 |
| Albert H. Tracy | 1821–1825 | New York | Democratic-Republican | 1793–1859 |
| Andrew Tracy | 1853–1855 | Vermont | Whig | 1797–1868 |
| Henry W. Tracy | 1863–1865 | Pennsylvania | Independent Republican | 1807–1886 |
| Phineas L. Tracy | 1827–1829 | New York | National Republican | 1786–1876 |
| Phineas L. Tracy | 1829–1833 | New York | Anti-Masonic | 1786–1876 |
| Uri Tracy | 1805–1807; 1809–1813 | New York | Democratic-Republican | 1764–1838 |
| Uriah Tracy | 1793–1795 | Connecticut | Pro-Administration | 1755–1807 |
| Uriah Tracy | 1795–1796 | Connecticut | Federalist | 1755–1807 |
| William I. Traeger | 1933–1935 | California | Republican | 1880–1935 |
| James Traficant | 1985–2002 | Ohio | Democratic | 1941–2014 |
| Mark Trafton | 1855–1857 | Massachusetts | American | 1810–1901 |
| Charles R. Train | 1859–1863 | Massachusetts | Republican | 1817-1885 |
| Andrew J. Transue | 1937–1939 | Michigan | Democratic | 1903-1995 |
| J. Bob Traxler | 1974–1993 | Michigan | Democratic | 1931–2019 |
| Philip A. Traynor | 1941–1943; 1945–1947 | Delaware | Democratic | 1874–1962 |
| Allen T. Treadway | 1913–1945 | Massachusetts | Republican | 1867–1947 |
| William Tredway | 1845–1847 | Virginia | Democratic | 1807–1891 |
| Thomas Tredwell | 1791–1795 | New York | Anti-Administration | 1743–1831 |
| Dave Treen | 1973–1980 | Louisiana | Republican | 1928–2009 |
| William M. Treloar | 1895–1897 | Missouri | Republican | 1850–1935 |
| Lyman Tremain | 1873–1875 | New York | Republican | 1819–1878 |
| James Trezvant | 1825–1831 | Virginia | Democratic | ????–1841 |
| Samuel Joelah Tribble | 1911–1916 | Georgia | Democratic | 1869–1916 |
| Paul Trible | 1977–1983 | Virginia | Republican | 1946–present |
| Abram Trigg | 1797–1809 | Virginia | Democratic-Republican | 1750–???? |
| Connally Findlay Trigg | 1885–1887 | Virginia | Democratic | 1847–1907 |
| John Johns Trigg | 1797–1804 | Virginia | Democratic-Republican | 1748–1804 |
| Carey A. Trimble | 1859–1863 | Ohio | Republican | 1813–1887 |
| David Trimble | 1817–1825 | Kentucky | Democratic-Republican | 1782–1842 |
| David Trimble | 1825–1827 | Kentucky | National Republican | 1782–1842 |
| James William Trimble | 1945–1967 | Arkansas | Democratic | 1894–1972 |
| John Trimble | 1867–1869 | Tennessee | Republican | 1812–1884 |
| Lawrence S. Trimble | 1865–1871 | Kentucky | Democratic | 1825–1904 |
| South Trimble | 1901–1907 | Kentucky | Democratic | 1864–1946 |
| Philip Triplett | 1839–1843 | Kentucky | Whig | 1799–1852 |
| Robert Pleasant Trippe | 1855–1859 | Georgia | American | 1819–1900 |
| David Trone | 2019–2025 | Maryland | Democratic | 1955–present |
| Dave Trott | 2015–2019 | Michigan | Republican | 1960–present |
| Samuel W. Trotti | 1842–1843 | South Carolina | Democratic | 1810–1856 |
| George Troup | 1807–1815 | Georgia | Democratic-Republican | 1780–1856 |
| Michael Carver Trout | 1853–1855 | Pennsylvania | Democratic | 1810–1873 |
| William I. Troutman | 1943–1945 | Pennsylvania | Republican | 1905–1971 |
| Rowland E. Trowbridge | 1861–1863; 1865–1869 | Michigan | Republican | 1821–1881 |
| Charles V. Truax | 1933–1935 | Ohio | Democratic | 1887–1935 |
| Andrew Trumbo | 1845–1847 | Kentucky | Whig | 1797–1871 |
| Jonathan Trumbull Jr. | 1789–1795 | Connecticut | Pro-Administration | 1740–1809 |
| Joseph Trumbull | 1834–1835 | Connecticut | National Republican | 1782–1861 |
| Joseph Trumbull | 1839–1843 | Connecticut | Whig | 1782–1861 |
| Niki Tsongas | 2007–2019 | Massachusetts | Democratic | 1946–present |
| Paul Tsongas | 1975–1979 | Massachusetts | Democratic | 1941–1997 |
| Stephanie Tubbs Jones | 1999–2008 | Ohio | Democratic | 1949–2008 |
| Amos Tuck | 1847–1849 | New Hampshire | Independent | 1810–1879 |
| Amos Tuck | 1849–1851 | New Hampshire | Free Soiler | 1810–1879 |
| Amos Tuck | 1851–1853 | New Hampshire | Whig | 1810–1879 |
| William M. Tuck | 1953–1969 | Virginia | Democratic | 1896–1983 |
| Ebenezer Tucker | 1825–1829 | New Jersey | National Republican | 1758–1845 |
| George Tucker | 1819–1825 | Virginia | Democratic-Republican | 1775–1861 |
| Henry St. George Tucker Sr. | 1815–1819 | Virginia | Democratic-Republican | 1780–1848 |
| Henry St. George Tucker III | 1889–1897; 1922–1932 | Virginia | Democratic | 1853–1932 |
| Jim Guy Tucker | 1977–1979 | Arkansas | Democratic | 1943–2025 |
| John Randolph Tucker | 1875–1887 | Virginia | Democratic | 1823–1897 |
| Starling Tucker | 1817–1825 | South Carolina | Democratic-Republican | 1770–1834 |
| Starling Tucker | 1825–1831 | South Carolina | Democratic | 1770–1834 |
| Thomas Tudor Tucker | 1789–1793 | South Carolina | Anti-Administration | 1745–1828 |
| Tilghman Tucker | 1843–1845 | Mississippi | Democratic | 1802–1859 |
| Walter R. Tucker III | 1993–1995 | California | Democratic | 1957–present |
| John Q. Tufts | 1875–1877 | Iowa | Republican | 1840–1902 |
| Pleasant B. Tully | 1883–1885 | California | Democratic | 1829–1897 |
| T. James Tumulty | 1955–1957 | New Jersey | Democratic | 1913–1981 |
| John V. Tunney | 1965–1971 | California | Democratic | 1934–2018 |
| Stanley R. Tupper | 1961–1967 | Maine | Republican | 1921–2006 |
| Robert Turnbull | 1910–1913 | Virginia | Democratic | 1850–1920 |
| Benjamin S. Turner | 1871–1873 | Alabama | Republican | 1825–1894 |
| Bob Turner | 2011–2013 | New York | Republican | 1941–present |
| Charles Henry Turner | 1889–1891 | New York | Democratic | 1861–1913 |
| Charles Turner Jr. | 1809–1813 | Massachusetts | Democratic-Republican | 1760-1839 |
| Clarence W. Turner | 1922–1923; 1933–1939 | Tennessee | Democratic | 1866–1939 |
| Daniel Turner | 1827–1829 | North Carolina | Democratic | 1796–1860 |
| Erastus J. Turner | 1887–1891 | Kansas | Republican | 1846–1933 |
| Henry G. Turner | 1881–1897 | Georgia | Democratic | 1839–1904 |
| James Turner | 1833–1837 | Maryland | Democratic | 1783–1861 |
| Jim Turner | 1997–2005 | Texas | Democratic | 1946–present |
| Oscar Turner | 1879–1881 | Kentucky | Independent Democrat | 1825–1896 |
| Oscar Turner | 1881–1883 | Kentucky | Democratic | 1825–1896 |
| Oscar Turner | 1883–1885 | Kentucky | Independent Democrat | 1825–1896 |
| Oscar Turner | 1899–1901 | Kentucky | Democratic | 1867–1902 |
| Smith S. Turner | 1894–1897 | Virginia | Democratic | 1842–1898 |
| Sylvester Turner | 2025 | Texas | Democratic | 1954–2025 |
| Thomas Turner | 1877–1881 | Kentucky | Democratic | 1821–1900 |
| Thomas J. Turner | 1847–1849 | Illinois | Democratic | 1815–1874 |
| Hopkins L. Turney | 1837–1843 | Tennessee | Democratic | 1797–1857 |
| Jacob Turney | 1875–1879 | Pennsylvania | Democratic | 1825–1891 |
| Charles Murray Turpin | 1929–1937 | Pennsylvania | Republican | 1878–1946 |
| Louis Washington Turpin | 1889–1890; 1891–1895 | Alabama | Democratic | 1849–1903 |
| Joel Turrill | 1833–1837 | New York | Democratic | 1794–1859 |
| J. Russell Tuten | 1963–1967 | Georgia | Democratic | 1911–1968 |
| Joseph H. Tuthill | 1871–1873 | New York | Democratic | 1811–1877 |
| Selah Tuthill | 1821 | New York | Democratic-Republican | 1771–1821 |
| William E. Tuttle Jr. | 1911–1915 | New Jersey | Democratic | 1870–1923 |
| William M. Tweed | 1853–1855 | New York | Democratic | 1823–1878 |
| John H. Tweedy | 1847–1848 | Wisconsin | Whig | 1814–1891 |
| Samuel Tweedy | 1833–1835 | Connecticut | National Republican | 1776–1868 |
| Ginery Twichell | 1867–1873 | Massachusetts | Republican | 1811–1883 |
| Robert Twyman | 1947–1949 | Illinois | Republican | 1897–1976 |
| Millard Tydings | 1923–1927 | Maryland | Democratic | 1890–1961 |
| Asher Tyler | 1843–1845 | New York | Whig | 1798–1875 |
| David Gardiner Tyler | 1893–1897 | Virginia | Democratic | 1846–1927 |
| James Manning Tyler | 1879–1883 | Vermont | Republican | 1835–1926 |
| John Tyler | 1816–1821 | Virginia | Democratic-Republican | 1790–1862 |
| William T. Tyndall | 1905–1907 | Missouri | Republican | 1862–1928 |
| James Noble Tyner | 1869–1875 | Indiana | Republican | 1826–1904 |
| Jacob Tyson | 1823–1825 | New York | Democratic-Republican | 1773–1848 |
| Job Roberts Tyson | 1855–1857 | Pennsylvania | Oppositionist | 1803–1858 |
| John R. Tyson | 1921–1923 | Alabama | Democratic | 1856–1923 |
