= Thomas Taber II =

American politician

Member of the United States House of Representatives
- In office November 5, 1828 – March 3, 1829
- Preceded by: Thomas Jackson Oakley
- Succeeded by: Abraham Bockee
- Constituency: New York's 5th congressional district

Member of the New York State Assembly
- In office January 1, 1826 – January 9, 1826 Serving with Isaac R. Adriance, Daniel D. Akin, Martin Lawrence
- Preceded by: John Armstrong, Jr., Eli Angevine, Enos Hopkins
- Succeeded by: John Fowks Jr.
- Constituency: Dutchess County

Personal details
- Born: Thomas Taber II; May 19, 1785 Dover, New York, U.S.
- Died: March 21, 1862 (aged 76) Roslyn, New York
- Resting place: Friends Cemetery, Westbury, New York
- Party: Democratic
- Other political affiliations: Democratic-Republican; Jacksonian; Free Soil
- Spouse: Phebe Titus (m. 1820–1824, her death)
- Children: 2 (including Stephen Taber)
- Relatives: George T. Pierce (nephew)
- Occupation: Farmer; Businessman

Thomas Taber II (Note: His name is sometimes spelled "Tabor" and he sometimes used the suffix "2nd" or "2d" to distinguished himself from a relative, Thomas Taber (1767–1830).) (May 19, 1785 – March 21, 1862) was an American farmer, businessman, and politician from New York. He was most notable for his service as a member of the New York State Assembly in 1826 and as a member of the United States House of Representatives from 1828 to 1829.

A native of Dover, New York, Taber was educated locally and became active in farming and businesses, including insurance, banking, and railroads. Taber was long active in politics as a Democratic-Republican, Jacksonian, and Democrat, and during his life attended numerous local, county, and state party conventions as a delegate. In 1825, Taber appeared to win election to the New York State Assembly, and he took his seat in January; John Fowks Jr. successfully contested the result and replaced Taber after Taber had served just a few days. In 1828, Taber won a special election to fill a vacancy in the United States House of Representatives, and he served in the second session of the 20th United States Congress, November 1828 to March 1829.

In his later years, Taber moved to Roslyn, New York, to live near his son, Stephen Taber. He died in Roslyn on March 21, 1862, and was buried at Friends Cemetery in Westbury, New York.

== Early life ==
Taber was born in Dover, New York, on May 19, 1785, one of ten children born to William Taber and Martha (Akin) Taber, and the grandson of Thomas Taber (1732–1783). William Taber was a successful farmer who also served as a judge and a member of the New York State Assembly. Thomas Taber attended the common schools of Dutchess County and became active in farming and business ventures.

== Start of career ==
In 1811, Taber was appointed a justice of the peace. The Dutchess County Agricultural Society was organized in May 1819, and Taber was a charter member. He remained active in the society for most of his life, and served as a vice president in the 1840s. In March 1815, Taber was one of several Dutchess County Democratic-Republicans who requested that New York's council of appointment rescind the appointment of Philip Spencer Jr. as county clerk. Spencer, the brother of Ambrose Spencer and brother-in-law of DeWitt Clinton, had been accused of crimes including arson, and had developed an unsavory reputation as a result. His appointment proved so unpopular that he resigned later that year.

In March 1817, Taber was a delegate to the county Democratic-Republican nominating convention that appointed state convention delegates pledged to DeWitt Clinton for governor and John Tayler for lieutenant governor, and he was selected as a delegate to the state convention. In June 1818, Taber was appointed one of the state's commissioners for Dutchess County; commissioners were responsible for officially acknowledging the transfer of deeds and other sale documents. Clinton and Tayler were elected, and in 1819, Taber was an unsuccessful candidate for the New York State Assembly, running as a Clinton supporter during a factional split in New York's Democratic-Republican Party. In October 1822, Taber was a delegate to the Dutchess County Democratic-Republican convention that chose candidates for county sheriff, clerk, coroner, the state legislature, and the U.S. House.

In September 1824, Taber was a delegate to the Dutchess County Democratic-Republican convention which met to select delegates to the state party convention scheduled for Utica. In October 1824, he was a delegate to the county nominating convention that chose candidates for Congress, the New York State Senate, and the state assembly. In January 1825, Taber chaired a meeting of Dutchess County Democratic-Republicans that resolved to support Andrew Jackson for president in the 1825 contingent election and requested that their U.S. House member, William W. Van Wyck, vote for Jackson. Taber served briefly in the New York State Assembly beginning on January 1, 1826; his election to the 49th New York State Legislature was contested by John Fowks Jr., who was seated on January 10.

In April 1828, the Dover and Union Vale Turnpike Company was created with the intent of constructing a toll road from the Connecticut state line in Dover west through Poughkeepsie to the town of Union Vale, and Taber was an original incorporator. Later in 1828, Taber won a special election as a Jacksonian to fill the U.S. House of Representatives seat left vacant by the resignation of Thomas Jackson Oakley. He served for one session of the 20th United States Congress, November 5, 1828, to March 3, 1829.

== Continued career ==
When the Bank of Poughkeepsie was chartered in 1829, Taber was elected to its first board of directors. Taber was a delegate to the September 1830 county Democratic-Republican convention that chose delegates to the state party nominating convention that was scheduled for later that month, which chose Enos T. Throop for governor and Edward Philip Livingston for lieutenant governor. In 1831, Taber was a delegate to a nationwide protectionist convention that took place in New York City and met to argue for high tariffs and opposition to free trade. The convention's position on the issue was codified at the national level with passage of the Tariff of 1832.

On February 7, 1832, delegates to a convention of Dutchess County farmers chose Taber as one of the county's delegates to a state agricultural convention which took place in Albany on February 14. In September 1832, Taber was a delegate to the county Democratic-Republican convention that nominated delegates to the party's state convention, and he was chosen as a state convention delegate. When the New York and Albany Railroad was incorporated in June 1833, Taber was an original incorporator and was one of the commissioners appointed to oversee the corporation's initial stock subscription. In October 1835, Taber was a delegate to the county Democratic convention that nominated candidates for the state senate.

In January 1836, Taber was chosen as a Dutchess County delegate to a statewide agricultiural convention that took place In February. In May 1836, the Dutchess County Mutual Insurance Company was organized in Poughkeepsie, and Taber was elected to its first board of directors. In September 1838, Taber was a delegate to the Democratic county convention that selected delegates to the state party's nominating convention, and won election as a delegate to the state convention. In 1839, Taber was an unsuccessful Democratic candidate for the state assembly. In September 1840, Taber took part in a mass Democratic rally that was held in Poughkeepsie with the intent of building statewide support for that year's elections. He was subsequently appointed one of the campaign's vice presidents for Dutchess County.

In September 1843, Taber was a delegate to the state Democratic convention. In October 1844, Taber was a candidate for the Democratic nomination for Congress, but lost to William W. Woodworth, who went on to win the general election. In May 1846, he was appointed one of the judges of the Dutchess County Court. In October 1846, he was a delegate to the state Democratic convention.

In 1848, New York's state Democratic convention chose Taber as a presidential elector, and he was later selected as an elector by the Free Soil Party, but Whig nominee Zachary Taylor won New York's electoral votes. In July 1849, Taber was one of the prominent Democrats who attempted to resolve the dispute between New York's Barnburners and Hunkers by serving as vice president of a union convention in Dutchess County. The county convention called for a statewide union convention, and Taber was chosen as a delegate. In August 1854, the shareholders and directors of the New York and Harlem Railroad were victimized by a fraud involving counterfeit stock certificates. During the company's response, Taber was one of the shareholders appointed to the nominating committee that proposed candidates for a reorganized board of directors.

== Later life ==
In his later years, Taber moved to Roslyn to live with his son Stephen. He died in Roslyn on March 21, 1862 and was buried at Friends Cemetery in Westbury.

== Family ==
On February 2, 1820, Taber married Phebe Titus. They were the parents of two sons, Samuel and Stephen. Stephen Taber also served in the state assembly and as a member of Congress.

Taber was the uncle of George T. Pierce, a member of the New York State Assembly and New York State Senate.

== Notes ==
U.S. House of Representatives
Preceded by Thomas Jackson Oakley	Member of the U.S. House of Representatives from New York's 5th congressional district 1828–1829	Succeeded by Abraham Bockee
