= Abraham Bockee =

American lawyer and politician (1784–1865)

Member of the U.S. House of Representatives from New York's 5th district
- In office March 4, 1833 – March 3, 1837
- Preceded by: Edmund H. Pendleton
- Succeeded by: Obadiah Titus

Member of the U.S. House of Representatives from New York's 5th district
- In office March 4, 1829 – March 3, 1831
- Preceded by: Thomas Taber II
- Succeeded by: Edmund H. Pendleton

Member of the New York Senate from the 2nd district
- In office 1842–1845
- Preceded by: Henry A. Livingston
- Succeeded by: Saxton Smith

Member of the New York State Assembly from the Dutchess County district
- In office 1820–1820

First Judge of the Dutchess County Court
- In office 1846–1846

Personal details
- Born: February 3, 1784 Shekomeko, New York, U.S.
- Died: June 1, 1865 (aged 81) Shekomeko, New York, U.S.
- Resting place: Estate in Shekomeko, New York
- Party: Federalist (early); Jacksonian
- Spouse: Martha Oakley
- Children: 6, including Catharine Jerusha, Mary, Jesse Oakley, Alexander Phoenix, Isaac Smith, Phoenix
- Education: Union College (1803)
- Occupation: Lawyer, politician, farmer, judge

Abraham Bockee (February 3, 1784 – June 1, 1865) was an American lawyer and politician from New York. He served three non-consecutive terms in the U.S. House of Representatives from 1829 to 1831 and from 1833 to 1837, and later served in the New York State Senate.

== Early life and education ==
Bockee was born on February 3, 1784, in Shekomeko, New York, in what is now Dutchess County. He attended the public schools and graduated from Union College in 1803.

He studied law in Poughkeepsie, was admitted to the bar in 1806, and practiced in Poughkeepsie until 1815, when he returned to Shekomeko to engage in agricultural pursuits.

== Political career ==
=== State Assembly ===
Bockee was a Federalist member of the New York State Assembly (Dutchess County) in 1820.

=== U.S. Congress ===
He was elected as a Jacksonian to the 21st United States Congress, representing New York's 5th congressional district, and served from March 4, 1829, to March 3, 1831.

He was elected again to the 23rd and 24th United States Congresses, serving from March 4, 1833, to March 3, 1837. He served as Chairman of the Committee on Agriculture during the 23rd and 24th Congresses.

=== State Senate ===
He was a member of the New York State Senate (2nd District) from 1842 to 1845, sitting in the 65th, 66th, 67th, and 68th New York State Legislatures.

=== Judicial career ===
He was First Judge of the Dutchess County Court in 1846.

== Personal life ==
Bockee married Martha Oakley, and they had six children: Catharine Jerusha, Mary, Jesse Oakley, Alexander Phoenix, Isaac Smith, and Phoenix.

== Death ==
Bockee died on June 1, 1865, in Shekomeko, New York, and was buried on his estate there.

U.S. House of Representatives
Preceded by Thomas Taber II	Member of the U.S. House of Representatives from New York's 5th congressional district 1829–1831	Succeeded by Edmund H. Pendleton
Preceded by Edmund H. Pendleton	Member of the U.S. House of Representatives from New York's 5th congressional district 1833–1837	Succeeded by Obadiah Titus
New York State Senate
Preceded by Henry A. Livingston	New York State Senate; 2nd District (Class 3); 1842–1845	Succeeded by Saxton Smith
