= Old First Presbyterian Church (Newark, New Jersey) =

Historic church in New Jersey, United States

- U.S. National Register of Historic Places
- New Jersey Register of Historic Places
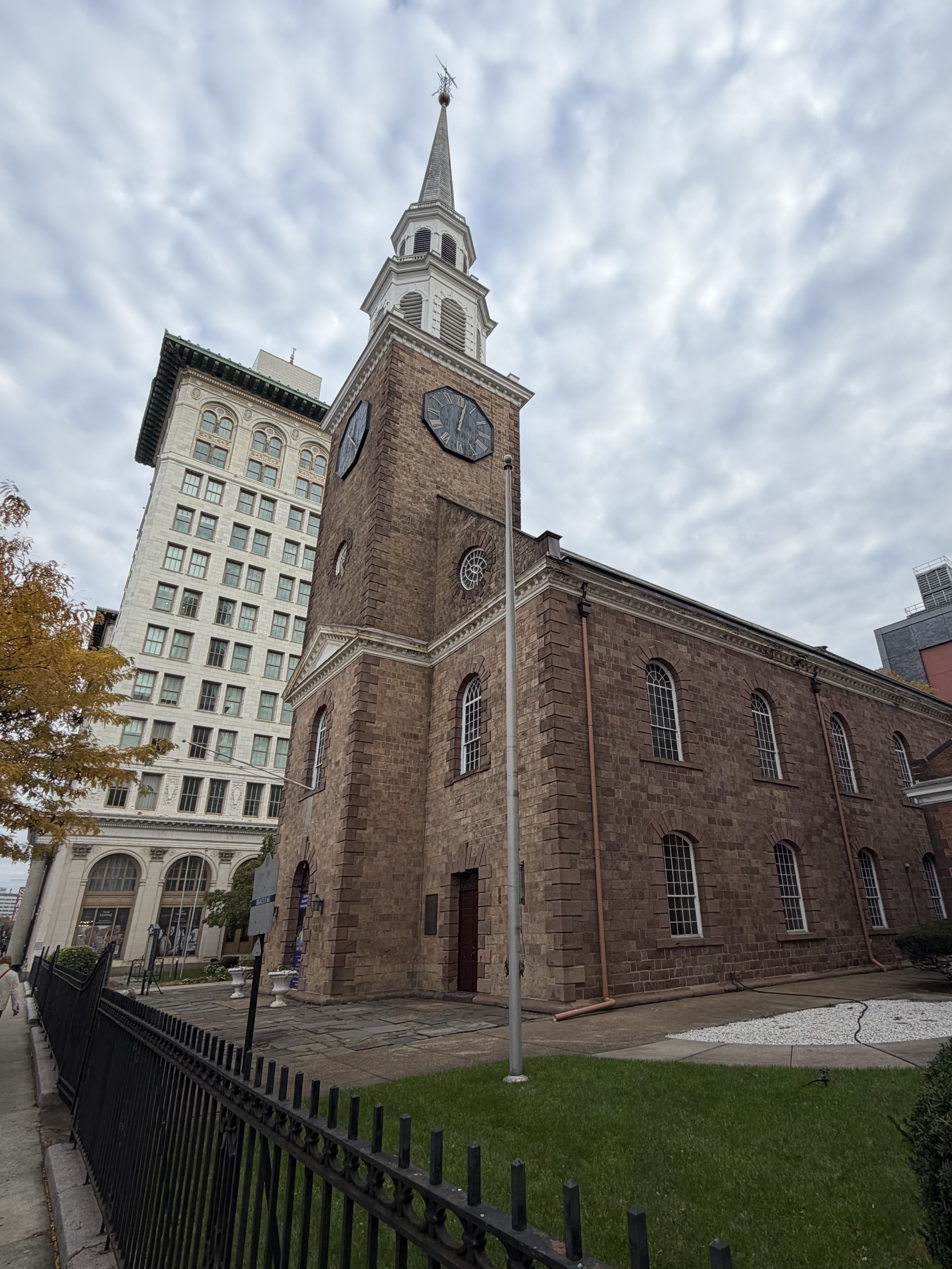

- Location within Essex County, New Jersey Location within New Jersey Location within the United States
- Location: 820 Broad Street, Newark, New Jersey
- Coordinates: 40°44′3″N 74°10′21″W
- Built: 1787
- Architect: Eleazer Ball
- Architectural style: Colonial, Georgian
- NRHP reference No.: 72000781
- NJRHP No.: 1300

Significant dates
- Added to NRHP: November 2, 1972
- Designated NJRHP: August 2, 1972

The former Old First Presbyterian Church, also known as First Presbyterian Church and Cemetery, is a church in Newark, Essex County, New Jersey, United States. The church is now known as First Church Newark, New Jersey. The church was listed on the National Register of Historic Places in 1972. The grounds, located in the Four Corners Historic District, includes an old burial ground.

== Notable burials ==
- William Burnet (1730–1791), physician who represented New Jersey in the Continental Congress from 1780 to 1781.
- Silas Condit (1778–1861), represented New Jersey in the United States House of Representatives from 1831 to 1833.
- Thomas Ward (1759–1842), represented New Jersey's 1st congressional district in the United States House of Representatives from 1813 to 1817.
- Thomas M. Woodruff (1804–1855), represented New York's 5th congressional district in the United States House of Representatives from 1845 to 1847.

== See also ==
- National Register of Historic Places listings in Essex County, New Jersey
