= Charles Johnston (New York politician) =

American politician

- Born: February 14, 1793; Salisbury, Connecticut, US
- Died: September 1, 1845 (aged 52)
- Office: Member of the U.S. House of Representatives
- Political party: Whig

Charles Johnston (February 14, 1793 – September 1, 1845) was a U.S. representative from New York.

Johnston was born in Salisbury, Connecticut, and attended the common schools. He moved to Poughkeepsie, New York, He studied law, was admitted to the bar and practiced in Poughkeepsie.

Johnston was elected as a Whig to the 26th Congress (March 4, 1839 – March 3, 1841). He was an unsuccessful candidate for reelection in 1840 to the 27th Congress.

After leaving Congress, Johnston resumed practicing law.

He died in Poughkeepsie on September 1, 1845. He was originally interred in the burying ground of Christ Episcopal Church. In 1861 he was reburied at Poughkeepsie Rural Cemetery.

U.S. House of Representatives
Preceded by Obadiah Titus	Member of the U.S. House of Representatives from New York's 5th congressional district 1839–1841	Succeeded by Richard D. Davis
