= Bartow White =

American politician

Member of the U.S. House of Representatives from New York's 5th district
- In office March 4, 1825 – March 3, 1827
- Preceded by: William W. Van Wyck
- Succeeded by: Thomas J. Oakley

Personal details
- Born: Bartow White
- Party: National Republican Party

Bartow White (November 7, 1776 in Yorktown, New York, Westchester County, New York – December 12, 1862 in Fishkill, Dutchess County, New York) was an American medical doctor and politician from New York.

== Life ==
He was the son of Dr. Ebenezer White (1746–1826) and Helena (Bartow) White. He attended the common schools and completed preparatory studies. Then he studied medicine with his father, and with Dr. Seaman in New York City, and commenced practice in Fishkill in 1799. In May 1804, he married Ann Schenck (1783–1861), and they had nine daughters and three sons.

White was elected to the 19th United States Congress, holding office from March 4, 1825, to March 3, 1827. Afterwards he resumed the practice of medicine. He was a presidential elector on the Whig ticket in 1840 voting for William Henry Harrison. In 1845, the Board of Regents of the University of the State of New York conferred an honorary degree of M.D. on White.

He suffered from epilepsy during the last 15 years of his life. He was buried in the Dutch Reformed Church Cemetery in Fishkill.

U.S. House of Representatives
Preceded by William W. Van Wyck	Member of the U.S. House of Representatives from New York's 5th congressional district 1825–1827	Succeeded by Thomas J. Oakley
