= Thomas M. Woodruff =

American politician

Member of the U.S. House of Representatives from New York's 5th district
- In office March 4, 1845 – March 3, 1847
- Preceded by: Moses G. Leonard
- Succeeded by: Frederick A. Tallmadge

Personal details
- Born: May 3, 1804 Newark, New Jersey, USA
- Died: March 28, 1855 (aged 50) New York, New York, USA
- Resting place: Old First Presbyterian Church
- Party: American Party

Thomas M. Woodruff (May 3, 1804 – March 28, 1855) represented New York's 5th congressional district in the United States House of Representatives from 1845 to 1847.

== Biography ==
Born in Newark, New Jersey, Woodruff was employed as a cabinetmaker and later engaged in the furniture business in New York City.

He was elected as a candidate of the American Party to the Twenty-ninth Congress (March 4, 1845 – March 3, 1847).

He died in New York City on March 28, 1855, and was interred in the First Presbyterian Church Cemetery in Newark, New Jersey.

== Sources ==
- United States Congress. "Thomas M. Woodruff (id: W000719)". Biographical Directory of the United States Congress.
- Thomas M. Woodruff at The Political Graveyard

U.S. House of Representatives
Preceded by Moses G. Leonard	Member of the U.S. House of Representatives from New York's 5th congressional district 1845–1847	Succeeded by Frederick A. Tallmadge
