= Richard D. Davis =

American politician

Chairman of the Committee on Revolutionary Claims
- In office 1843–1845

Member of the U.S. House of Representatives from New York
- In office March 4, 1841 – March 3, 1845
- Preceded by: Charles Johnston
- Succeeded by: William W. Woodworth
- Constituency: 5th district (1841–43); 8th district (1843–45)

Personal details
- Born: Richard David Davis; 1799 Stillwater, New York, U.S.
- Died: June 17, 1871 (aged 71–72) Waterford, New York, U.S.
- Party: Democratic
- Education: Yale College

Richard David Davis (1799 – June 17, 1871) was an American lawyer and politician who served two terms as a U.S. representative from New York from 1841 to 1845.

== Biography ==
Born at Stillwater, New York, Davis graduated from Yale College in 1818. He studied law. He was admitted to the bar in 1821 and commenced practice in Poughkeepsie.

=== Tenure in Congress ===
Davis was elected as a Democrat to the Twenty-seventh and Twenty-eighth Congresses (March 4, 1841 – March 4, 1845). He served as chairman of the Committee on Revolutionary Claims (Twenty-eighth Congress). He was not a candidate for renomination in 1844. Withdrew from political and professional life.

=== Later career and death ===
He engaged in agricultural pursuits in Waterford, New York, where he died on June 17, 1871. He was interred in Waterford Rural Cemetery.

U.S. House of Representatives
Preceded by Charles Johnston	Member of the U.S. House of Representatives from New York's 5th congressional district 1841–1843	Succeeded by Moses G. Leonard
Preceded by Jacob Houck, Jr. Robert McClellan	Member of the U.S. House of Representatives from New York's 8th congressional district 1843–1845	Succeeded by William W. Woodworth
