= Samuel A. Talcott =

American lawyer and politician

New York Attorney General
- In office February 12, 1821 – January 27, 1829
- Preceded by: Thomas Jackson Oakley
- Succeeded by: Greene C. Bronson

Personal details
- Born: December 31, 1789 Hartford, Connecticut
- Died: March 19, 1836 (aged 46) New York City
- Children: John Ledyard Talcott (b. 1812) Thomas Grosvenor Talcott (b. 1819)
- Education: Williams College

Samuel Austin Talcott (December 31, 1789 Hartford, Connecticut – March 19, 1836 New York City) was an American lawyer and politician.

== Life ==
He was the son of Samuel Talcott (1740-1798, grandson of Joseph Talcott, Colonial Governor of Connecticut) and Abigail Ledyard Talcott. On May 28, 1810, he married Rachel Skinner; their son was John Ledyard Talcott (b. 1812), a justice of the New York Supreme Court.

He graduated from Williams College in 1809, and he practiced law at New Hartford, New York. There he married, in 1818, his second wife, Mary Eliza Stanley (1800-1848), and their son was Thomas Grosvenor Talcott (1819-1870).

He was a leading member of the Albany Regency and was New York State Attorney General from February 12, 1821 to January 27, 1829, when he was forced to resign "due to irregular habits", a then-used euphemism for what is now called a "drinking problem". Afterward, he practiced law in New York City.

He is mentioned briefly as a character in The Witch of Blackbird Pond, written by Elizabeth George Speare in 1958.

== Sources ==
- Talcott genealogy
- List of NY State Attorneys General, at Office of the Att. Gal. of NY
- Bio and photo of his son John, at The Historical Society of the Courts in the State of NY
- Talcott genealogy, at rootsweb (giving wrong birthplace)
- Political Graveyard
- His second marriage, info at New Hartford Public Library
- Info on his father-in-law F. Stanley, at The NYG&B
- List of NY State Attorneys General, at Office of the Att. Gal. of NY
- Marriage records Talcott/Skinner

Legal offices
| Preceded by Thomas J. Oakley | New York State Attorney General; 1821 – 1829 | Succeeded by Greene C. Bronson |
