= Thomas J. Oakley =

American politician

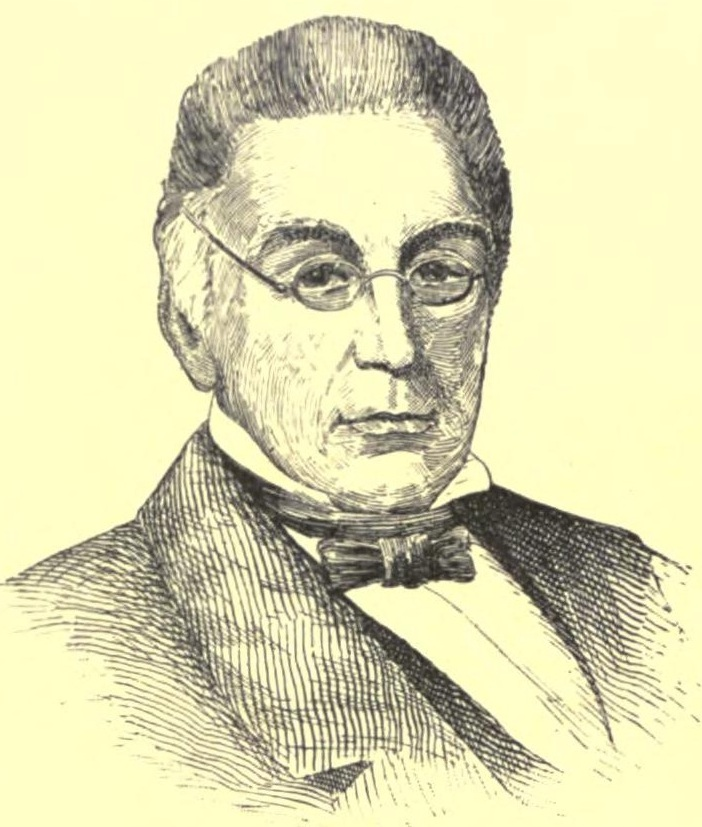

Member of the U.S. House of Representatives from New York
- In office March 4, 1813 – March 4, 1815
- Preceded by: James Emott
- Succeeded by: Abraham H. Schenck
- Constituency: 4th district
- In office March 4, 1827 – May 9, 1828
- Preceded by: Bartow White
- Succeeded by: Thomas Taber II
- Constituency: 5th district

New York State Attorney General
- In office 1819–1821
- Governor: DeWitt Clinton
- Preceded by: Martin Van Buren
- Succeeded by: Samuel A. Talcott

Personal details
- Born: Thomas Jackson Oakley; November 10, 1783 Beekman, New York
- Died: May 11, 1857 (aged 73)
- Resting place: Trinity Churchyard
- Spouses: Lydia Williams (m. 1808, died): Matilda Cruger
- Children: 6
- Parents: Jerusha Petera Oakley; Jesse Oakley
- Education: Yale College

Thomas Jackson Oakley (November 10, 1783 – May 11, 1857) was a New York attorney, politician, and judge. He served as a United States representative from 1813 to 1815, and from 1827 to 1828, and as New York State Attorney General from 1819 to 1821.

== Early life ==
Oakley was born in Beekman, New York on November 10, 1783. He was the son of Jerusha (Petera) Oakley and Jesse Oakley, a farmer and veteran of the American Revolution.

He graduated from Yale College in 1801, studied law with attorney Philo Ruggles in Poughkeepsie, and was admitted to the bar in 1804.

== Career ==
Oakley practiced first in Poughkeepsie, and later in New York City. Among his notable cases, Oakley and Thomas Addis Emmet represented Aaron Ogden in the landmark case Gibbons v. Ogden, which the United States Supreme Court ultimately resolved in favor of Gibbons, who was represented by Daniel Webster and William Wirt.

Oakley was Surrogate of Dutchess County from 1810 to 1811. He was elected as a Federalist to the Thirteenth United States Congress (March 4, 1813 – March 3, 1815). During this term, Oakley was an anti-war Federalist and opposed U.S. participation in the War of 1812.

Oakley was a member of the New York State Assembly in 1816, and again from 1818 to 1820. From 1819 to 1821, he was New York State Attorney General.

In 1826, he was again elected to Congress, serving from March 4, 1827, until May 9, 1828, when he resigned to accept a judgeship. He was a judge of the superior court of New York City from 1828 to 1847. In 1847, he was appointed chief judge, and he served until his death in office.

In 1853, Oakley received the honorary degree of LL.D. from Union College.

== Personal life ==
In 1808, Oakley married Lydia Williams, the daughter of Abigail (née Sayre) Williams and Robert Williams, a prominent business and political figure in Poughkeepsie. They were the parents of a son:, Robert Williams Oakley, a Union College graduate, attorney, and militia officer who died unmarried in 1832.

After the death of his first wife Oakley married Matilda Cruger (1809–1891); the daughter of Henry Cruger, who had the unique distinction of serving as both a member of Parliament (1774–1780; 1784–1790) and as a New York State Senator (1792–1796) Thomas and Matilda were the parents of five children, three daughters and two sons. Oakley died May 11, 1857, and was buried at Trinity Churchyard in New York City.

=== Descendants ===
Through his daughter Matilda Cruger (née Oakley) Rhinelander (1827–1914), who married William Rhinelander, he was the grandfather of Thomas Jackson Oakley Rhinelander (1858–1946) and Philip Jacob Rhinelander (1865–1940), both of whom were prominent in New York society during the Gilded Age.

U.S. House of Representatives
Preceded by James Emott	Member of the U.S. House of Representatives from New York's 4th congressional district 1813–1815	Succeeded by Abraham H. Schenck
Political offices
Preceded by Martin Van Buren	New York State Attorney General; 1819–1821	Succeeded by Samuel A. Talcott
U.S. House of Representatives
Preceded by Bartow White	Member of the U.S. House of Representatives from New York's 5th congressional district 1827–1828	Succeeded by Thomas Taber II
