= Moravian mission at Shekomeko =

- Mission station
- Location within New York
- Coordinates: 41.9283358°N 73.5987854°W
- Country: United States
- State: New York
- Founded: 1740
- Disbanded: 1746
- Founder: Christian Henry Rauch

The Moravian mission at Shekomeko was founded in 1740 by Christian Henry Rauch to convert the Mahican Indians in eastern New York.

== Background ==
In the late 1730s, the Moravian Church established their first missionary efforts in North America near Bethlehem, Pennsylvania. The Moravian Church had been founded during the 15th century in Bohemia and Moravia. Following almost total destruction in the Thirty Years' War and Counter Reformation, it had been revived in the 1720s under the guidance of Nicolas Ludwig Zinzendorf on his Herrnhut estate in Saxony.

Moravian Bishop August Gottlieb Spangenberg sent Christian Henry Rauch to New York City in 1740 on a mission to preach and convert any native peoples he could find. Rauch arrived in New York on July 16, 1740 and met with a delegation of Mahican Indians who had come to the city to settle land issues. The Mahicans were a native Algonquian tribe and branch of the Lenni Lenape or Delaware Nation populated the east bank of the Hudson River in what is today eastern Dutchess County, New York, and western Connecticut. Rauch discovered that he could converse in Dutch with the Mahican, who were somewhat acquainted with the language from their contact with Dutch settlements along the Hudson.

== Establishment ==
Rauch convinced the delegation of his serious intention to instruct them in religion and Mahican Chiefs Tschoop and Shabash invited Rauch to visit their Dutchess County village. The Mahicans were not unfamiliar with Christian missionaries, as they had encountered Congregationalists in nearby Stockbridge, Mass. Rauch arrived in Shekomeko in mid-August, where he lived among the Mahicans and learned their language. Initially, his efforts were met with derision. He established a Moravian mission there and the two Indians chiefs were converted to the Moravian faith. The following year Rauch was joined by missionary Gottlieb Buttner. In February 1742, Rauch and Buttner travelled to Bethlehem, Pennsylvania where they were ordained deacons. They were accompanied by three Mahicans who were then baptized. Rauch's first convert Chief Tschoop, was lame and unable to make the journey. Upon their baptism the three were given the Christian names of Abraham, Isaac and Jacob. After the group returned to Shekomeko, Tschoop was baptized as Johannes on April 16, 1742. Johannes died at Shekomeko of smallpox in August 1746.

By summer 1742, Shekomeko was established as the first native Christian congregation in America. On October 1, 1742, missionary Gottlieb Buttner brought his wife to the mission. At the end of 1742, another missionary, Martin Mack, and his wife, Jeannette Rowe, joined the missionary effort. Rauch visited Bethlehem and returned in early 1743 with his new wife. Two more missionaries each with their wives followed soon after. The Shekomeko congregation numbered thirty-one Mahican Christians. In late January 1743, Martin Mack and his wife moved to the Mahican settlement of Pachgotgoch, across the border in Connecticut.

On March 13, 1743, the distribution of Holy Communion marked a milestone in the development of the Indian congregation. In July 1743, a Moravian chapel was built and dedicated at Shekomeko. By the end of 1743, the congregation of baptized Indians numbered 63. Two satellite missionary outposts were established in Kent, Connecticut and on the New York - Connecticut border.

== Difficulties ==
The increasing Moravian influence and success in defending their burgeoning following became disturbing to the region's white colonists. False rumors of atrocities were spread, some fearful settlers had left their farms and the authorities were petitioned to intervene. Resentment by European settlers in the area quickly grew. The Moravian missionaries exposed traders illegally selling alcohol to the natives and provided legal advice that kept them from being cheated. Some Mahicans of Wechquatnach reported being offered rum by a settler in Freehold, if they would kill Brother Rauch.

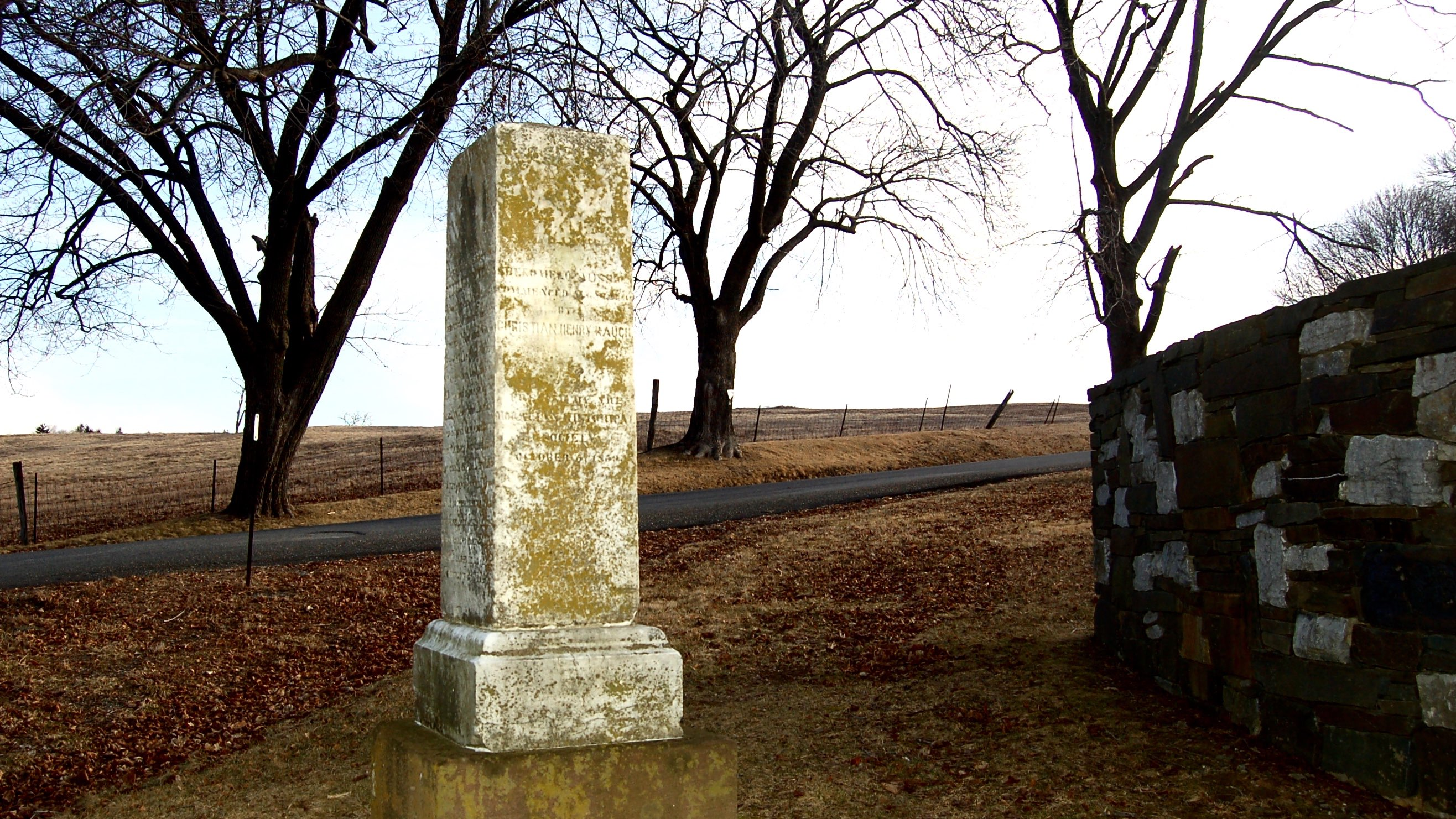
Monument to the Moravian Christian Mission at Shekomeko. Moravian Historical Society, dedicated Oct 5, 1859.

The Moravian missionaries were repeatedly detained, interrogated, fined and released. Governor George Clinton summoned the Moravians to account for their missionary activities. Alleged to be Papist and conspiring with the outlawed Roman Catholic order of Jesuits, the Moravians successfully defended themselves and were exonerated when no link to the Jesuits could be found. However, they were admonished to cause no further suspicions.

The settlers' enmity for the Moravians continued to grow. They persisted to oppose the Shekomeko mission and were determined to eradicate it. A law was enacted on September 21, 1744 forbidding anyone from residing with Indians in order to Christianize them. The Moravian mission was finally doomed when the provincial assembly adopted a law on September 22, 1744 that required anyone choosing to live among the Indians to take an Oath to the Crown, obtain consent of the council and obtain a license from the Governor to do so; Moravian religious principles forbade taking oaths.

On October 27, 1744, the governor ordered the Moravian missionaries to "desist from further teaching and depart the province". Then on December 15, 1744, the sheriff and three peace officers of Dutchess County appeared at Shekomeko under orders from Governor Clinton to give the missionaries notice to cease their teachings. The Moravian leaders were summoned to appear in court at Poughkeepsie.

== Closure ==
The Moravians missionary venture was maintained sporadically for several years. In 1746, area settlers petitioned the governor to issue to them a warrant authorizing the killing of Shekomeko Indians. While the petition was not granted, upon hearing about the call for their extermination, the last ten families of 44 persons, all that remained of the original 8,000 member tribe 100 years before, left Shekomeko and dispersed to Pennsylvania and east to the mission at Pachgatgoch, also called Schaghticoke.

== See also ==
- American Provinces of the Moravian Church
- History of the Moravian Church
- Gnadenhutten massacre
- Gnadenhütten massacre (Pennsylvania)
- Shekomeko, New York
