= New York's 5th congressional district =

U.S. House district for New York

- Interactive map of district boundaries since January 3, 2025
- Representative: Gregory Meeks; D–Queens
- Distribution: 100% urban; 0% rural
- Population (2025): 804,418
- Median household income: $85,096
- Ethnicity: 40.2% Black; 20.6% Hispanic; 14.9% Asian; 12.8% White; 5.7% Two or more races; 4.9% other; 0.9% Native American
- Cook PVI: D+24

New York's 5th congressional district is a congressional district for the United States House of Representatives, represented by Democrat Gregory Meeks. The district is located in Queens. A plurality of the district's population is African-American, and a majority of the district's population is non-white.

The district includes the entire Rockaway Peninsula as well as the Queens neighborhoods of Briarwood, Broad Channel, Cambria Heights, Hollis, Howard Beach, Jamaica, Kew Gardens, Laurelton, Queens Village, Richmond Hill, Rosedale, South Jamaica, Saint Albans, Springfield Gardens, and South Ozone Park, as well as John F. Kennedy International Airport.

The district encompasses the African-American majority neighborhoods of east Queens, as well as the Caribbean-American and South Asian American enclaves of southern and eastern Queens, including the neighborhoods of Jamaica, Ozone Park, Richmond Hill, South Ozone Park, and Hollis, home to large Guyanese, Jamaican, Trinidadian and Tobagonian, Indian, Bangladeshi, and Haitian populations. As of 2018, the district's Guyanese American population makes up 7.3% of the district, the highest of any congressional district in the country, and its Indian American population stands at 8.35%, the highest of any district in New York. The 5th district also has the second highest percentages of Jamaican Americans, Bangladeshi Americans, Trinidadian and Tobagonian Americans, and Haitian Americans out of all of New York's congressional districts.

== Voter registration ==
Voter registration and party enrollment as of February 20, 2025
Party	Active voters	Inactive voters	Total voters	Percentage
Democratic	288,521	18,584	307,105	67.62%
Republican	40,355	1,896	42,251	9.30%
Conservative	1,753	95	1,848	0.41%
Working Families	1,587	86	1,673	0.37%
Other	6,908	484	7,392	1.63%
Unaffiliated	89,264	4,621	93,885	20.67%
Total	428,388	25,766	454,154	100%

== Recent election results from statewide races ==
Year	Office	Results
2008	President	Obama 85% - 15%
2012	President	Obama 89% - 11%
2016	President	Clinton 84% - 14%
2016	Senate	Schumer 89% - 10%
2018	Senate	Gillibrand 88% - 12%
2018	Governor	Cuomo 87% - 12%
2018	Attorney General	James 87% - 12%
2020	President	Biden 81% - 18%
2022	Senate	Schumer 76% - 23%
2022	Governor	Hochul 73% - 27%
2022	Attorney General	James 75% - 25%
2022	Comptroller	DiNapoli 75% - 25%
2024	President	Harris 70% - 28%
2024	Senate	Gillibrand 74% - 26%

== History ==
1789–1913:

Parts of Manhattan

1913–45:

Parts of Brooklyn

1945–63:

Parts of Queens

1963–93:

Parts of Nassau

1993–2003:

Parts of Nassau, Queens, Suffolk

2003–2023:

Parts of Nassau, Queens

2023—:

Parts of Queens

Various New York districts have been numbered "5" over the years, including areas in New York City and various parts of upstate New York. From 2003–13, the district consisted of northeastern Queens County and northwestern Nassau County. The Queens portion of the district included the neighborhoods of Bayside, Corona, Douglaston, Flushing, Jamaica Estates, Little Neck, and Whitestone. The Nassau portion of the district included Albertson, Great Neck, Manhasset, Port Washington, Roslyn, and Sands Point.

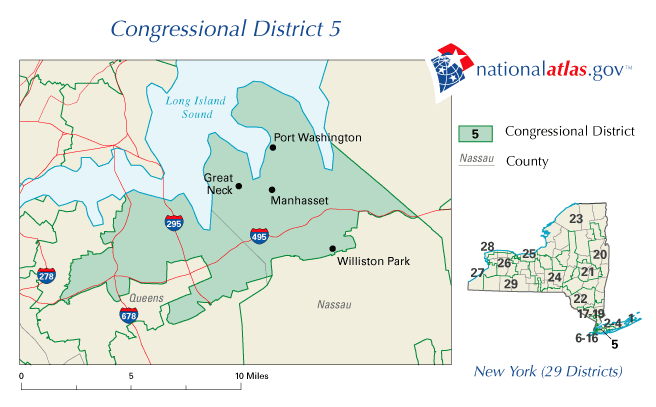
2003–2013

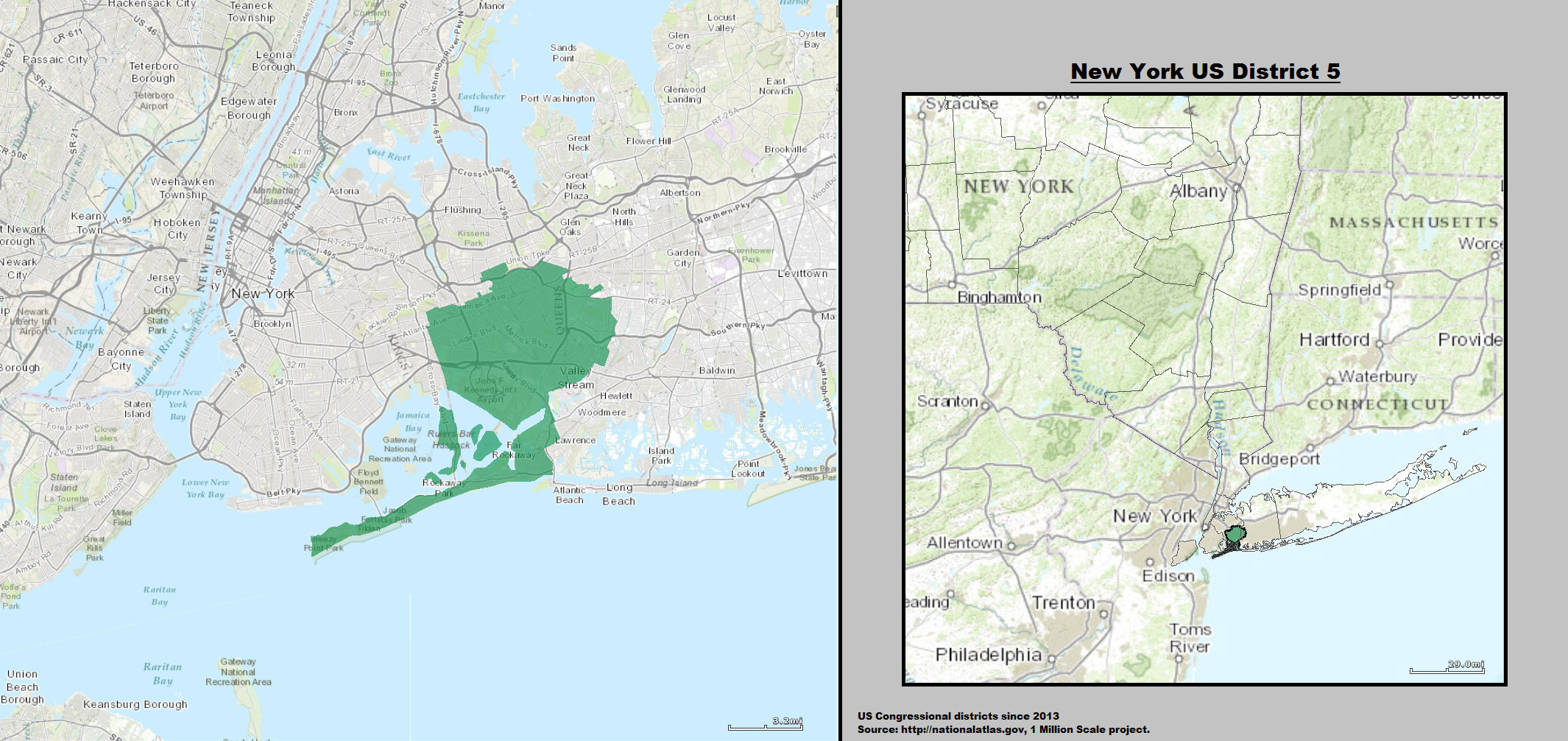
2013–2023

== Current composition ==
The 5th district is located in the entirety of the New York City borough of Queens. Queens neighborhoods in the district include:

- Arverne
- Baisley Park
- Bayswater
- Belle Harbor
- Breezy Point
- Briarwood
- Broad Channel
- Brookville
- Cambria Heights
- Edgemere
- Far Rockaway
- Hollis
- Holliswood
- Howard Beach
- Jamaica
- Jamaica Estates
- Kew Gardens
- Laurelton
- Lindenwood
- Ozone Park
- Queens Village
- Richmond Hill
- Rochdale Village
- Rockaway Beach
- Rockaway Park
- Rosedale
- St. Albans
- South Jamaica
- South Ozone Park
- South Richmond Hill
- Springfield Gardens

== List of members representing the district ==
Prior to 1992 the 5th district was centered on the south shore of Nassau County including towns mostly now in the 3rd and 4th district. The Queens portions of the 5th had been previously primarily in the 8th district of the 1980s. In general, the present 5th district greatly mirrors the 6th district from 1972 to 1982. The 1990s version of this district included northeast Nassau and northwest Suffolk counties; these areas were placed in the 2nd and 3rd district in 2002 and the 5th district gained areas in Queens formerly in the 18th district.

Representative	Party	Years	Cong ress	Electoral history	District location
District established March 4, 1789
Peter Silvester (Kinderhook)	Pro-Administration	March 4, 1789 – March 3, 1793	1st 2nd	Elected in 1789. Re-elected in 1790. Retired.	
Theodorus Bailey (Poughkeepsie)	Anti-Administration	March 4, 1793 – March 3, 1795	3rd 4th	Elected in 1793. Re-elected in 1794. Lost re-election.	
Theodorus Bailey (Poughkeepsie)	Democratic-Republican	March 4, 1795 – March 3, 1797	3rd 4th	Elected in 1793. Re-elected in 1794. Lost re-election.	
David Brooks (Poughkeepsie)	Federalist	March 4, 1797 – March 3, 1799	5th	Elected in 1796. Lost re-election.	
Theodorus Bailey (Poughkeepsie)	Democratic-Republican	March 4, 1799 – March 3, 1801	6th	Elected in 1798. Retired.	
Thomas Tillotson (Rhinebeck)	Democratic-Republican	March 4, 1801 – August 10, 1801	7th	Elected in 1800. Resigned to become N.Y. Secretary of State.	
Vacant		August 10, 1801 – December 7, 1801	7th		
Theodorus Bailey (Poughkeepsie)	Democratic-Republican	December 7, 1801 – March 3, 1803	7th	Elected to finish Tillotson's term. Retired to run for U.S. senator.	
Andrew McCord (Stony Ford)	Democratic-Republican	March 4, 1803 – March 3, 1805	8th	Elected in 1802. [data missing]	
John Blake Jr. (Montgomery)	Democratic-Republican	March 4, 1805 – March 3, 1809	9th 10th	Elected in 1804. Re-elected in 1806. [data missing]	
Barent Gardenier (Kingston)	Federalist	March 4, 1809 – March 3, 1811	11th	Redistricted from the 7th district and re-elected in 1808. Retired.	
Thomas B. Cooke (Catskill)	Democratic-Republican	March 4, 1811 – March 3, 1813	12th	Elected in 1810. [data missing]	
Thomas P. Grosvenor (Hudson)	Federalist	March 4, 1813 – March 3, 1817	13th 14th	Redistricted from the 6th district and re-elected in 1812. Re-elected in 1814. [data missing]	
Philip J. Schuyler (Rhinebeck)	Federalist	March 4, 1817 – March 3, 1819	15th	Elected in 1816. Retired.	
James Strong (Hudson)	Federalist	March 4, 1819 – March 3, 1821	16th	Elected in 1818. [data missing]	
Vacant		March 4, 1821 – December 3, 1821	17th	Elections were held in April 1821. It is unclear when results were announced or credentials issued.	
Walter Patterson (Livingston)	Federalist	December 3, 1821 – March 3, 1823	17th	Elected in 1821. [data missing]	
William W. Van Wyck (Fishkill)	Democratic-Republican	March 4, 1823 – March 3, 1825	18th	Redistricted from the 4th district and re-elected in 1822. [data missing]	
Bartow White (Fishkill)	Anti-Jacksonian	March 4, 1825 – March 3, 1827	19th	Elected in 1824. Retired.	
Thomas J. Oakley (Poughkeepsie)	Jacksonian	March 4, 1827 – May 9, 1828	20th	Elected in 1826. Resigned to become judge of the Superior Court of New York City.	
Vacant		May 9, 1828 – December 1, 1828	20th		
Thomas Taber II (Dover)	Jacksonian	December 1, 1828 – March 3, 1829	20th	Elected to finish Oakley's term. Had not run for the next term.	
Abraham Bockee (Shekomeko)	Jacksonian	March 4, 1829 – March 3, 1831	21st	Elected in 1828. [data missing]	
Edmund H. Pendleton (Hyde Park)	Anti-Jacksonian	March 4, 1831 – March 3, 1833	22nd	Elected in 1830. [data missing]	
Abraham Bockee (Shekomeko)	Jacksonian	March 4, 1833 – March 3, 1837	23rd 24th	Elected in 1832. Re-elected in 1834. [data missing]	
Obadiah Titus (Washington)	Democratic	March 4, 1837 – March 3, 1839	25th	Elected in 1836. [data missing]	
Charles Johnston (Poughkeepsie)	Whig	March 4, 1839 – March 3, 1841	26th	Elected in 1838. [data missing]	
Richard D. Davis (Poughkeepsie)	Democratic	March 4, 1841 – March 3, 1843	27th	Elected in 1840. Redistricted to the 8th district.	
Moses G. Leonard (New York)	Democratic	March 4, 1843 – March 3, 1845	28th	Elected in 1842. [data missing]	
Thomas M. Woodruff (New York)	American	March 4, 1845 – March 3, 1847	29th	Elected in 1844. [data missing]	
Frederick A. Tallmadge (New York)	Whig	March 4, 1847 – March 3, 1849	30th	Elected in 1846. [data missing]	
George Briggs (New York)	Whig	March 4, 1849 – March 3, 1853	31st 32nd	Elected in 1848. Re-elected in 1850. [data missing]	
William M. Tweed (New York)	Democratic	March 4, 1853 – March 3, 1855	33rd	Elected in 1852. [data missing]	
Thomas R. Whitney (New York)	American	March 4, 1855 – March 3, 1857	34th	Elected in 1854. [data missing]	
William B. Maclay (New York)	Democratic	March 4, 1857 – March 3, 1861	35th 36th	Elected in 1856. Re-elected in 1858. [data missing]	
William Wall (Brooklyn)	Republican	March 4, 1861 – March 3, 1863	37th	Elected in 1860. [data missing]	
Fernando Wood (New York)	Democratic	March 4, 1863 – March 3, 1865	38th	Elected in 1862. [data missing]	
Nelson Taylor (New York)	Democratic	March 4, 1865 – March 3, 1867	39th	Elected in 1864. [data missing]	
John Morrissey (New York)	Democratic	March 4, 1867 – March 3, 1871	40th 41st	Elected in 1866. Re-elected in 1868. [data missing]	
William R. Roberts (New York)	Democratic	March 4, 1871 – March 3, 1875	42nd 43rd	Elected in 1870. Re-elected in 1872. [data missing]	
Edwin R. Meade (New York)	Democratic	March 4, 1875 – March 3, 1877	44th	Elected in 1874. [data missing]	
Nicholas Muller (New York)	Democratic	March 4, 1877 – March 3, 1881	45th 46th	Elected in 1876. Re-elected in 1878. [data missing]	
Benjamin Wood (New York)	Democratic	March 4, 1881 – March 3, 1883	47th	Elected in 1880. [data missing]	
Nicholas Muller (New York)	Democratic	March 4, 1883 – March 3, 1885	48th	Elected in 1882. Redistricted to the 6th district.	
Archibald M. Bliss (Brooklyn)	Democratic	March 4, 1885 – March 3, 1889	49th 50th	Elected in 1884. Re-elected in 1886. [data missing]	
Thomas F. Magner (Brooklyn)	Democratic	March 4, 1889 – March 3, 1893	51st 52nd	Elected in 1888. Re-elected in 1890. Redistricted to the 6th district.	
John H. Graham (Brooklyn)	Democratic	March 4, 1893 – March 3, 1895	53rd	Elected in 1892. [data missing]	
Charles G. Bennett (Brooklyn)	Republican	March 4, 1895 – March 3, 1899	54th 55th	Elected in 1894. Re-elected in 1896. [data missing]	
Frank E. Wilson (Brooklyn)	Democratic	March 4, 1899 – March 3, 1903	56th 57th	Elected in 1898. Re-elected in 1900. Redistricted to the 4th district.	
Edward M. Bassett (Brooklyn)	Democratic	March 4, 1903 – March 3, 1905	58th	Elected in 1902. [data missing]	
George E. Waldo (Brooklyn)	Republican	March 4, 1905 – March 3, 1909	59th 60th	Elected in 1904. Re-elected in 1906. [data missing]	
Richard Young (Brooklyn)	Republican	March 4, 1909 – March 3, 1911	61st	Elected in 1908. [data missing]	
William Cox Redfield (Brooklyn)	Democratic	March 4, 1911 – March 3, 1913	62nd	Elected in 1910. [data missing]	
James P. Maher (Brooklyn)	Democratic	March 4, 1913 – March 3, 1919	63rd 64th 65th	Redistricted from the 3rd district and re-elected in 1912. Re-elected in 1914. Re-elected in 1916. Redistricted to the 7th district.	
John B. Johnston (Brooklyn)	Democratic	March 4, 1919 – March 3, 1921	66th	Elected in 1918. [data missing]	
Ardolph L. Kline (Brooklyn)	Republican	March 4, 1921 – March 3, 1923	67th	Re-elected in 1920. [data missing]	
Loring M. Black Jr. (Brooklyn)	Democratic	March 4, 1923 – January 3, 1935	68th 69th 70th 71st 72nd 73rd	Elected in 1922. Re-elected in 1924. Re-elected in 1926. Re-elected in 1928. Re-elected in 1930. Re-elected in 1932. [data missing]	
Marcellus H. Evans (Brooklyn)	Democratic	January 3, 1935 – January 3, 1941	74th 75th 76th	Elected in 1934. Re-elected in 1936. Re-elected in 1938. [data missing]	
James J. Heffernan (Brooklyn)	Democratic	January 3, 1941 – January 3, 1945	77th 78th	Elected in 1940. Re-elected in 1942. Redistricted to the 11th district.	
James A. Roe (Queens)	Democratic	January 3, 1945 – January 3, 1947	79th	Elected in 1944. [data missing]	
Robert T. Ross (Queens)	Republican	January 3, 1947 – January 3, 1949	80th	Elected in 1946. [data missing]	
T. Vincent Quinn (Queens)	Democratic	January 3, 1949 – December 30, 1951	81st 82nd	Elected in 1948. Re-elected in 1950. [data missing]	
Vacant		December 31, 1951 – February 18, 1952	82nd		
Robert T. Ross (Queens)	Republican	February 19, 1952 – January 3, 1953	82nd	Elected to finish Quinn's term. Lost re-election.	
Albert H. Bosch (Queens)	Republican	January 3, 1953 – December 31, 1960	83rd 84th 85th 86th	Elected in 1952. Re-elected in 1954. Re-elected in 1956. Re-elected in 1958. [data missing]	
Vacant		January 1, 1961 – January 2, 1961	86th		
Joseph P. Addabbo (Queens)	Democratic	January 3, 1961 – January 3, 1963	87th	Elected in 1960. Redistricted to the 7th district.	
Frank J. Becker (Lynbrook)	Republican	January 3, 1963 – January 3, 1965	88th	Redistricted from the 3rd district and re-elected in 1962. [data missing]	
Herbert Tenzer (Cedarhurst)	Democratic	January 3, 1965 – January 3, 1969	89th 90th	Elected in 1964. Re-elected in 1966. [data missing]	
Allard K. Lowenstein (Long Beach)	Democratic	January 3, 1969 – January 3, 1971	91st	Elected in 1968. [data missing]	
Norman F. Lent (East Rockaway)	Republican	January 3, 1971 – January 3, 1973	92nd	Elected in 1970. Redistricted to the 4th district.	
John W. Wydler (Garden City)	Republican	January 3, 1973 – January 3, 1981	93rd 94th 95th 96th	Redistricted from the 4th district and re-elected in 1972. Re-elected in 1974. Re-elected in 1976. Re-elected in 1978. Not a candidate for reelection in 1980.	
Raymond J. McGrath (Valley Stream)	Republican	January 3, 1981 – January 3, 1993	97th 98th 99th 100th 101st 102nd	Elected in 1980. Re-elected in 1982. Re-elected in 1984. Re-elected in 1986. Re-elected in 1988. Re-elected in 1990. Redistricted to the 4th district and retired.	
Gary Ackerman (Roslyn Heights)	Democratic	January 3, 1993 – January 3, 2013	103rd 104th 105th 106th 107th 108th 109th 110th 111th 112th	Redistricted from the 7th district and re-elected in 1992. Re-elected in 1994. Re-elected in 1996. Re-elected in 1998. Re-elected in 2000. Re-elected in 2002. Re-elected in 2004. Re-elected in 2006. Re-elected in 2008. Re-elected in 2010. Retired.	
Gary Ackerman (Roslyn Heights)	Democratic	January 3, 1993 – January 3, 2013	103rd 104th 105th 106th 107th 108th 109th 110th 111th 112th	Redistricted from the 7th district and re-elected in 1992. Re-elected in 1994. Re-elected in 1996. Re-elected in 1998. Re-elected in 2000. Re-elected in 2002. Re-elected in 2004. Re-elected in 2006. Re-elected in 2008. Re-elected in 2010. Retired.	2003–2013; Parts of Nassau, Queens counties
Gregory Meeks (Queens)	Democratic	January 3, 2013 – present	113th 114th 115th 116th 117th 118th 119th	Redistricted from the 6th district and re-elected in 2012. Re-elected in 2014. Re-elected in 2016. Re-elected in 2018. Re-elected in 2020. Re-elected in 2022. Re-elected in 2024. Re-elected in 2026.	2013–2023; Parts of Nassau, Queens counties
Gregory Meeks (Queens)	Democratic	January 3, 2013 – present	113th 114th 115th 116th 117th 118th 119th	Redistricted from the 6th district and re-elected in 2012. Re-elected in 2014. Re-elected in 2016. Re-elected in 2018. Re-elected in 2020. Re-elected in 2022. Re-elected in 2024. Re-elected in 2026.	2023–2025; Parts of Queens
Gregory Meeks (Queens)	Democratic	January 3, 2013 – present	113th 114th 115th 116th 117th 118th 119th	Redistricted from the 6th district and re-elected in 2012. Re-elected in 2014. Re-elected in 2016. Re-elected in 2018. Re-elected in 2020. Re-elected in 2022. Re-elected in 2024. Re-elected in 2026.	2025–present Parts of Queens

== Election results ==
Note that in New York State electoral politics there are numerous minor parties at various points on the political spectrum. Certain parties normally endorse either the Republican or Democratic candidate for every office, hence the state electoral results contain both the party votes, and the final candidate votes (Listed as "Recap").

US House election, 2024: New York District 5
Party	Candidate	Votes	%
Democratic	Gregory Meeks (incumbent)	168,425	72.9
Republican	Paul King	56,689	24.6
Conservative	Paul King	5,840	2.5
Total	Paul King	62,529	27.1
Total votes		230,954	100.0
Democratic hold			

US House election, 2022: New York District 5
Party	Candidate	Votes	%
Democratic	Gregory Meeks (incumbent)	104,396	75.1
Republican	Paul King	31,405	22.6
Conservative	Paul King	3,002	2.2
Total	Paul King	34,407	24.8
Write-in		184	0.1
Total votes		138,987	100.0
Democratic hold			

US House election, 2020: New York District 5
Party	Candidate	Votes	%
Democratic	Gregory Meeks (incumbent)	229,125	100.0
Total votes		229,125	100.0
Democratic hold			

US House election, 2018: New York District 5
Party	Candidate	Votes	%
Democratic	Gregory Meeks (incumbent)	160,500	100.0
Total votes		160,500	100.0
Democratic hold			

US House election, 2016: New York District 5
Party	Candidate	Votes	%
Democratic	Gregory Meeks	197,591	84.7
Women's Equality	Gregory Meeks	1,961	0.8
Total	Gregory Meeks (incumbent)	199,552	85.5
Republican	Michael A. O'Reilly	26,741	11.5
Conservative	Michael A. O'Reilly	3,516	1.5
Total	Michael A. O'Reilly	30,257	13.0
Green	Frank Francois	3,583	1.5
Total votes		233,392	100.0
Democratic hold			

US House election, 2014: New York District 5
Party	Candidate	Votes	%
Democratic	Gregory Meeks (incumbent)	75,712	95.1
Allen 4 Congress	Allen F. Steinhardt	3,870	4.9
Total votes		79,582	100.0
Democratic hold			

US House election, 2012: New York District 5
Party	Candidate	Votes	%
Democratic	Gregory Meeks	167,836	89.7
Republican	Alan Jennings	17,875	9.6
Libertarian	Catherine Wark	1,345	0.7
Total votes		187,056	100.0
Democratic hold			

US House election, 2010: New York District 5
Party	Candidate	Votes	%	±%
Democratic	Gary Ackerman (incumbent)	72,239	63.1	−7.9
Republican	James Milano	41,493	36.2	+9.1
Tax Revolt Party	Elizabeth Berney	798	0.7	+0.7
Majority		30,746	26.8	−17.1
Turnout		114,530	100	−27.9

US House election, 2008: New York District 5
Party	Candidate	Votes	%	±%
Democratic	Gary Ackerman (incumbent)	112,724	71.0	−29.0
Republican	Elizabeth Berney	43,039	27.1	+27.1
Conservative	Jun Policarpio	3,010	1.9	+1.9
Majority		69,685	43.9	−56.1
Turnout		158,773	100	+105.7

US House election, 2006: New York District 5
Party	Candidate	Votes	%	±%
Democratic	Gary Ackerman (incumbent)	77,190	100	+28.7
Majority		77,190	100	+56.6
Turnout		77,190	100	−54.0

US House election, 2004: New York District 5
Party	Candidate	Votes	%	±%
Democratic	Gary Ackerman (incumbent)	119,726	71.3	−21.0
Republican	Stephen Graves	46,867	27.9	+27.9
Independent	Gonzalo Policarpio	1,248	0.7	+0.7
Majority		72,859	43.4	−41.2
Turnout		167,841	100	+125.3

US House election, 2002: New York District 5
Party	Candidate	Votes	%	±%
Democratic	Gary Ackerman (incumbent)	68,773	92.3	+24.3
Conservative	Perry S. Reich	5,718	7.7	+7.7
Majority		63,055	84.6	+46.8
Turnout		74,491	100	−63.2

US House election, 2000: New York District 5
Party	Candidate	Votes	%	±%
Democratic	Gary Ackerman (incumbent)	137,684	68.0	+3.0
Republican	Edward Elkowitz	61,084	30.1	−3.0
Right to Life	Anne T. Robinson	3,846	1.9	−0.0
Majority		76,600	37.8	+5.9
Turnout		202,614	100	+35.2

US House election, 1998: New York District 5
Party	Candidate	Votes	%	±%
Democratic	Gary Ackerman (incumbent)	97,404	65.0	+1.3
Republican	David C. Pinzon	49,586	33.1	−1.9
Right to Life	Anne T. Robinson	2,872	1.9	+0.6
Majority		47,818	31.9	+3.2
Turnout		149,862	100	−24.2

US House election, 1996: New York District 5
Party	Candidate	Votes	%	±%
Democratic	Gary Ackerman (incumbent)	125,918	63.7	
Republican	Grant M. Lally	69,244	35.0	
Right to Life	Andrew J. Duff	2,623	1.3	
Majority		56,674	28.7	
Turnout		197,785	100	

US House election, 1870: New York District 5
Party	Candidate	Votes	%	±%
Democratic	William R. Roberts	14,566	85.6	
Republican	James A. Briggs	2,287	13.5	
Tammany Republican	George W. Gibbons	157	0.9	
Majority		12,279	72.1	
Turnout		17,010	100	

== See also ==
- List of United States congressional districts
- New York's congressional delegations
- New York's congressional districts
