= Walter Patterson (American politician) =

American politician

Member of the U.S. House of Representatives from New York's 5th district
- In office March 4, 1821 – March 3, 1823
- Preceded by: James Strong
- Succeeded by: William W. Van Wyck

Personal details
- Born: Columbia County, New York, U.S.
- Died: November 5, 1852 Philadelphia, Pennsylvania, U.S.
- Party: Federalist

Walter Patterson (died November 5, 1852) was an American politician from New York.

== Life ==
Patterson was born in Columbia County, New York, where he completed preparatory studies. He was the son of John and Catherine (née Livingston) Patterson, the grandson of merchant Robert Livingston, the nephew of Prince Edward Island Governor Walter Patterson and New York politicians Peter and Walter Livingston, and the brother of naval officer Daniel Patterson. He was a member of the New York State Assembly in 1818, and was Supervisor of the Town of Ancram in 1821 and 1823. At this time, he also managed the Ancram Iron Works.

He was elected as a Federalist to the 17th United States Congress, holding office from December 3, 1821, to March 3, 1823. Afterwards he removed to Livingston, New York and was Supervisor of the Town of Livingston from 1826 to 1828. He was an associate judge of the Columbia County Court from 1826 to 1830. He died in Philadelphia, Pennsylvania on November 5, 1852.

U.S. House of Representatives
Preceded by James Strong	Member of the U.S. House of Representatives from New York's 5th congressional district 1821–1823	Succeeded by William W. Van Wyck
