= Greene C. Bronson =

American judge

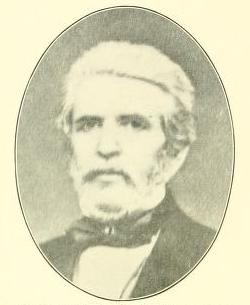

Chief Judge of the New York Court of Appeals
- In office January 1, 1850 – April 1851
- Preceded by: Freeborn G. Jewett
- Succeeded by: Charles H. Ruggles

Associate Judge of the New York Court of Appeals
- In office July 5, 1847 – January 1, 1850
- Preceded by: Office established

Chief Justice of the New York Supreme Court
- In office 1845–1847

Associate Justice of the New York Supreme Court
- In office 1836–1845

17th Attorney General of New York
- In office January 27, 1829 – January 12, 1836
- Preceded by: Samuel A. Talcott
- Succeeded by: Samuel Beardsley

Member of the New York General Assembly from Oneida and Oswego Counties
- In office January 1, 1822 – December 31, 1822

Personal details
- Born: November 17, 1789 Simsbury, Connecticut
- Died: September 3, 1863 (aged 73) Saratoga, New York
- Party: Democratic
- Other political affiliations: Anti-Rent; Hunker; Hard Shell

Greene Carrier Bronson (November 17, 1789 in Simsbury, Hartford County, Connecticut – September 3, 1863 in Saratoga, New York) was an American lawyer and politician from New York.

== Life ==
He was the son of Oliver Bronson (1746–1815, a music teacher and publisher) and Sarah Merrill Bronson (1754–1825). About 1802, the family removed from Simsbury to Cazenovia which was then in Oneida County, New York.

He was Surrogate of Oneida County from 1819 to 1821. He was a member of the New York State Assembly (Oneida and Oswego Co.) in 1822.

He was New York Attorney General from 1829 to 1836. He was an associate justice of the New York Supreme Court from 1836 to 1845, and chief justice from 1845 to 1847. He was one of the first four judges elected to the New York Court of Appeals at the 1847 New York special judicial election, and was Chief Judge from 1850 to 1851 when he resigned. Bronson was among the founders of Albany Law School.

In 1853, he was appointed Collector of the Port of New York. At the 1854 New York state election, he ran on the Hard Democratic ticket for Governor of New York, but came in last of the four candidates of the major parties.

From 1860 to 1862, he was Corporation Counsel of the City of New York.

He died on September 3, 1863, in Saratoga, New York; and was buried at Green-Wood Cemetery in Brooklyn.

== Sources ==
- Death notice, in NYT on September 4, 1863
- NY Court of Appeal history
- Portrait and short bio, at NY Court history
- His funeral, in NYT on September 8, 1863
- Google Books Genealogical History of the Early Settlers of West Simsbury by Abiel Brown (page 12, Case, Tiffany & Co., Hartford CT, 1856)
- Bronson genealogy, at rootsweb
- Google Books The New York Civil List compiled by Franklin Benjamin Hough (pages 37, 261, 346, 347 and 415; Weed, Parsons and Co., 1858)

Legal offices
Preceded by Samuel A. Talcott	New York Attorney General; 1829–1836	Succeeded by Samuel Beardsley
Preceded by Freeborn G. Jewett	Chief Judge of the New York Court of Appeals; 1850–1851	Succeeded by Charles H. Ruggles
Government offices
Preceded by Hugh Maxwell	Collector of the Port of New York; 1853	Succeeded by Heman J. Redfield
