= Moses G. Leonard =

American politician (1809–1899)

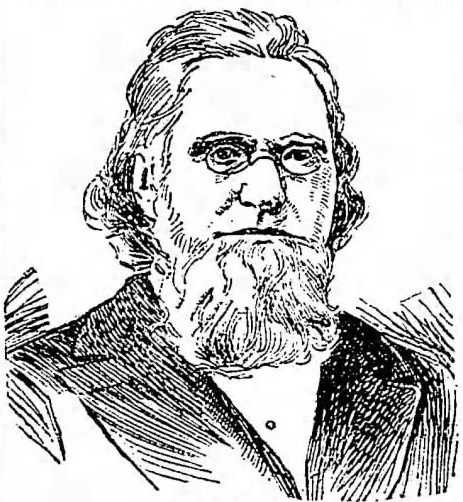

Member of the San Francisco City Council
- In office 1850

Member of the U.S. House of Representatives from New York's 5th district
- In office March 4, 1843 – March 3, 1845
- Preceded by: Richard D. Davis
- Succeeded by: Thomas M. Woodruff

Personal details
- Born: Moses Gage Leonard; July 10, 1809 Stafford, Connecticut, U.S.
- Died: March 20, 1899 (aged 89) New York City, U.S.
- Resting place: Oak Hill Cemetery, Nyack, New York, U.S.
- Party: Democratic
- Profession: Politician

Military service
- Allegiance: United States
- Rank: Provost marshal
- Battles/wars: American Civil War

Moses Gage Leonard (July 10, 1809 – March 20, 1899) was an American politician who served one term as a U.S. representative from New York from 1843 to 1845.

== Biography ==
Born in Stafford, Connecticut, Leonard grew up in Union and attended the public schools. He moved to New York City. City alderman and judge of the city court from 1840 to 1842.

=== Congress ===
Leonard was elected as a Democrat to the Twenty-eighth Congress (March 4, 1843 – March 4, 1845). He was an unsuccessful candidate for reelection in 1844 to the Twenty-ninth Congress. Almshouse commissioner in 1846.

=== Later career and death ===
He served as proprietor and director of ice companies. He served as commissioner of immigration at the port of New York.

He moved to San Francisco, California. He served as a member of the city council of San Francisco in 1850. He returned to New York and served as provost marshal in the Tenth Congressional District of New York during the Civil War.

He died in Brooklyn, New York, on March 20, 1899. He was interred in Oak Hill Cemetery, Nyack, New York.

U.S. House of Representatives
Preceded by Richard D. Davis	Member of the U.S. House of Representatives from New York's 5th congressional district 1843–1845	Succeeded by Thomas M. Woodruff
