= Edmund H. Pendleton =

American politician

Edmund Henry Pendleton
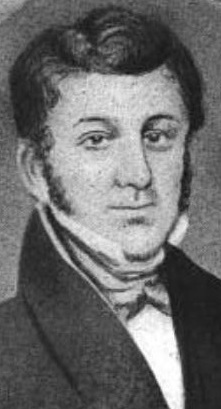
- Official portrait

Member of the U.S. House of Representatives from New York's 5th district
- In office March 4, 1831 – March 4, 1833
- Preceded by: Abraham Bockee
- Succeeded by: Abraham Bockee

Personal details
- Born: 1788 Savannah, Georgia, USA
- Died: February 25, 1862 (aged 73–74) New York City, New York, USA
- Party: Anti-Jacksonian
- Education: Columbia University

Coat of Arms of Edmund Pendleton

Edmund Henry Pendleton (1788 – February 25, 1862) was a U.S. representative from New York.

Born in Savannah, Georgia, Pendleton received a liberal schooling as a youth. He graduated from Columbia College in 1805 where he was a member of the Philolexian Society., studied law, was admitted to the bar in 1809, and practiced in Hyde Park, New York.

He was judge of Dutchess County, New York from 1830 to 1840. He was elected as an Anti-Jacksonian to the Twenty-second Congress (March 4, 1831 – March 4, 1833). He died in New York City on February 25, 1862, and was interred in St. James' Churchyard in Hyde Park.

U.S. House of Representatives
Preceded by Abraham Bockee	Member of the U.S. House of Representatives from New York's 5th congressional district 1831–1833	Succeeded by Abraham Bockee
