= William W. Van Wyck =

American politician

Member of the U.S. House of Representatives from New York
- In office March 4, 1821 – March 4, 1825
- Preceded by: Randall S. Street (4th); Walter Patterson (5th)
- Succeeded by: Joel Frost (4th); Bartow White (5th)
- Constituency: 4th district (1821-23); 5th district (1823-25)

Personal details
- Born: August 9, 1777 Fishkill, New York
- Died: August 27, 1840 (aged 63) Fishkill, New York
- Resting place: Dutch Reformed Churchyard, Fishskill, New York

William William Van Wyck (August 9, 1777 – August 27, 1840) was an American politician from New York.

== Life ==
Born near Fishkill, New York, Van Wyck attended the public schools and Fishkill Academy. He engaged in agricultural pursuits.

Van Wyck was elected as a Democratic-Republican to the 17th and 18th United States Congresses, holding office from December 3, 1821, to March 3, 1825. He was Chairman of the Committee on Expenditures in the Post Office Department (18th Congress).

He removed to Sudley, Virginia, and engaged in planting. He returned to Dutchess County, New York, and died in Fishkill. He was buried at the Dutch Reformed Churchyard.

U.S. House of Representatives
Preceded by Randall S. Street	Member of the U.S. House of Representatives from New York's 4th congressional district 1821–1823	Succeeded by Joel Frost
Preceded by Walter Patterson	Member of the U.S. House of Representatives from New York's 5th congressional district 1823–1825	Succeeded by Bartow White
