= Obadiah Titus =

American politician

Obadiah Titus (January 20, 1789 – September 2, 1854) was a U.S. representative from New York.

== Biography ==
Born in what is now Millbrook, New York, Titus was educated locally and studied law. He was admitted to the bar and commenced practice in the town of Washington, New York. He was also active in farming, and served as Secretary of the Dutchess County Agricultural Society. In addition, Titus was an organizer of the Dutchess County Mutual Insurance Company.

He was active in the New York Militia, and was appointed an ensign in Lieutenant Colonel Benjamin Herrick's Regiment of Light Infantry. During the War of 1812 he was a captain in New York's 141st Infantry Regiment.

Titus served in local offices, including county judge. He served as Sheriff of Dutchess County, New York from 1828 to 1831.

Titus was elected as a Democrat to the Twenty-fifth Congress (March 4, 1837 – March 3, 1839). From Sep 1837 to Mar 1839, Titus missed 66 of 475 roll call votes, which is 13.9%. This is better than the median of 23.4%. He was an unsuccessful candidate for reelection in 1838 to the Twenty-sixth Congress. He resumed the practice of law, and was also active in business, including serving as a Vice President of the New York and Albany Railroad.

He died in the town of Washington on September 2, 1854.

U.S. House of Representatives
Preceded by Abraham Bockee	Member of the U.S. House of Representatives from New York's 5th congressional district 1837–1839	Succeeded by Charles Johnston
