= William Woodworth (inventor) =

William Woodworth (1780 – February 9, 1839) was the inventor of the Woodworth Planing Machine.

== Early life ==
William Woodworth was born around 1780, probably in Massachusetts. He later moved to Hudson, New York, where he was a carpenter and carriage maker. He worked on the Livingston family estate as a superintendent of their mill. He was the father of William W. Woodworth.

== Woodworth Planing Machine ==
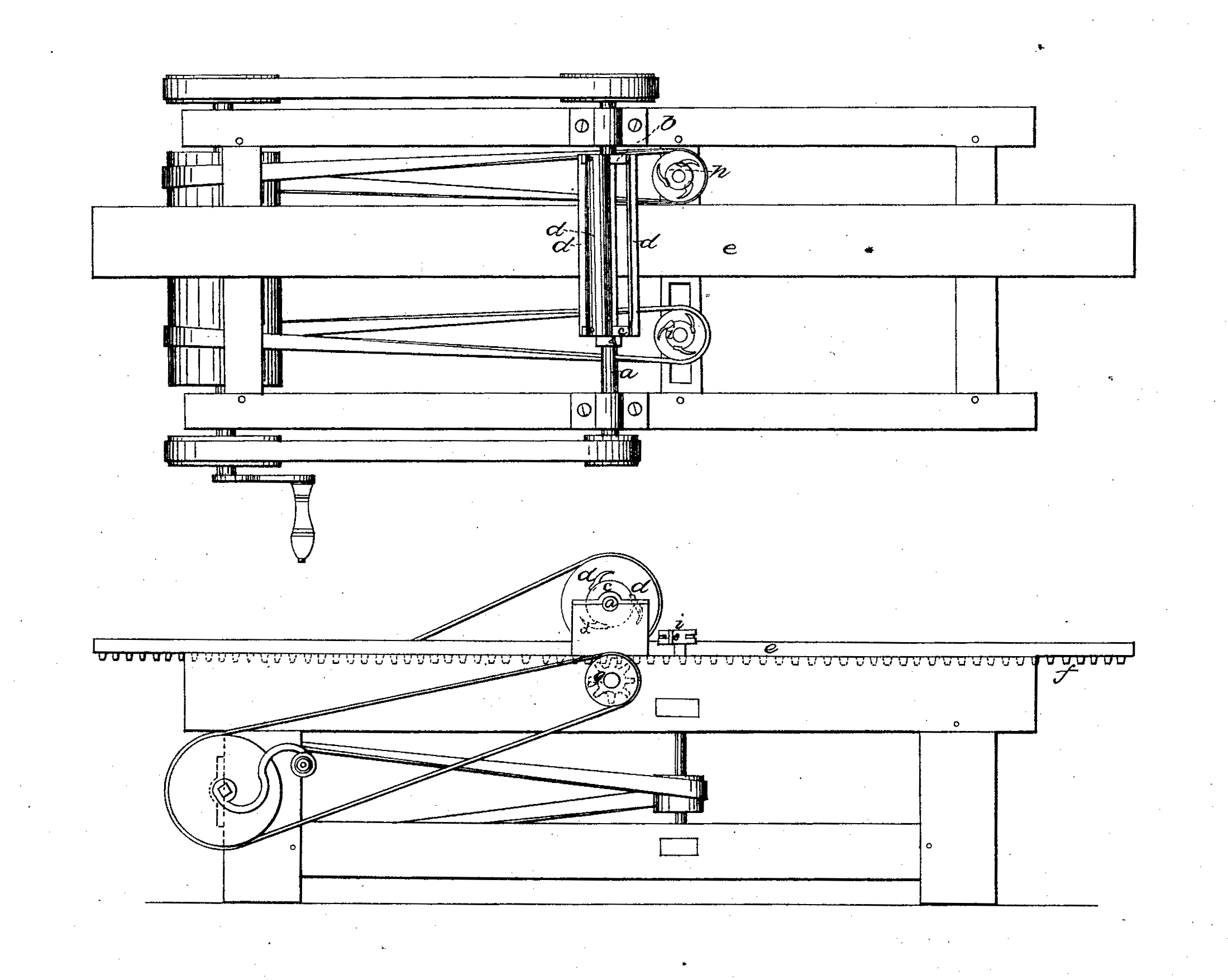
Drawing of the Woodworth Planing and Matching Machine as seen in patent USI1X0005315.

After spending years working around wood, Woodworth would design and then patent the Woodworth Planing Machine in 1828. Hailed as the greatest improvement to the planing machine so far and one of the most important inventions of the century, it added speed and efficiency to the process of creating lumber for domestic usage. The invention could perform the output of 25 laborers, cheapened finished lumber, and greatly increased the supply. In 1829, the Franklin Institute praised the invention. The United States Congress would praise the invention in 1850 along with Eli Whitney's Cotton Gin as the great labor savings inventions of the country.

=== Patent law impact ===
The Woodworth planing machine had a direct impact on patent law in the United States. Because Woodworth and his heirs repeatedly attempted, and succeeded many times in having the patent extended by Congress, it was attacked politically as a monopoly. Woodworth's heirs were subjected to one of the earlier special interest, community organizing campaigns in the country, as lumber merchants and carpenters, growing tired of paying a royalty to Woodworth's heirs, mounted a public campaign to have the extension of the patent blocked.

The Patent Law of 1836 allowed for inventors to receive a seven-year extension after the expiration of the 14-year term permitted at that time. In 1842, Woodworth's son William W. received an extension, and successfully lobbied Congress in 1845 for another extension, thus extending the patent until 1856.

William W. then petitioned Congress in 1850 for another full-term extension, which would have allowed a claim until 1870. This resulted in a public firestorm, leading to mass protests and accusations of monopolization and fraud. The city leadership of Philadelphia organized a mass meeting rallying support against Woodworth's heirs. Literature from Philadelphia against the patent extension showed up in Harrisburg, in which the State Assembly demanded their federal representatives block Woodworth's attempt. It was noted that much of the anti-Woodworth literature was printed, rather than written, indicating an orchestrated community organizing effort to block Congressional legislation extending the patent. Many letters were associated with the special interest groups against Woodworth's heirs, such as the "Select and Common Councils, Board of Trade, Wardens of the Port, Aldermen, and Recorder", as well as from 14 commissioners of the Northern Liberties district and 15 commissioners from the Spring Garden district in Philadelphia. Another group called the "Builders and Lumbers Group" was documented as lobbying against the extension. The letters against the Woodworth heirs also flooded into the Congressional patent committees from all over the country during the 1850, 1852, and 1854 sessions.

The Woodworth heirs had their own set of supporters ranging from lawyers, editors, doctors, and treasurers, with their letters handwritten, indicating a genuine concern about the protection of inventors' rights and reward for their heirs of their labor and genius. They also had their supporters in Congress, who reintroduced the legislation that would have granted the extension during every session after the request was made. The Woodworth heirs' stake in the extension was enormous, along with other patent assignees, as the patent generated $15 million annually in royalties, including $2.1 million over 24 years for one assignee named James G. Wilson.

Ultimately in 1856 the patent expired following Congress's failure to grant the extension. The Woodworth episode, coupled with other patent issues, resulted in patent law amendments passed in 1861 that extended the term of claims from 14 years to 17, without the possibility of further extensions.
