= William W. Woodworth =

American politician

Member of the U.S. House of Representatives from the 8th District of New York
- In office March 4, 1845 – March 3, 1847
- Preceded by: Richard D. Davis
- Succeeded by: Cornelius Warren

Personal details
- Born: March 16, 1807 New London, Connecticut. U.S.
- Died: February 13, 1873 (aged 65) Yonkers, New York, U.S.
- Resting place: Oakland Cemetery, Yonkers, New York, U.S.
- Party: Democratic
- Occupation: Businessman

William W. Woodworth (March 16, 1807 – February 13, 1873) was a U.S. representative from New York and member of the Woodworth political family.

== Life ==
Born in New London, Connecticut in 1807 to William Woodworth, he received limited formal schooling, and moved to Hyde Park, New York in 1834.

=== Public Service ===
Woodworth was the Town Supervisor of Hyde Park in 1838, 1841, 1843, and 1849. He was Judge of Dutchess County in 1838 and reappointed in 1843, and was an unsuccessful candidate for election in 1842 to the Twenty-eighth Congress, losing to Richard D. Davis.

Woodworth was elected to the Twenty-ninth Congress (March 4, 1845 – March 3, 1847), representing New York's 8th district. He was an unsuccessful candidate for renomination in 1846.

Woodworth was elected president of the Village of Yonkers in 1857 and 1858 and was elected receiver of taxes in 1870.

=== Business interests ===
Woodworth held interests in Cuba and formed the stock company of the Hudson River State Co. at Clinton, New York. His businesses were contracted for building a section of the Hudson River Railroad.

He moved to Yonkers, New York, December 1, 1849 to and engaged in the real estate business and banking. As administrator of his father's estate, he continued the patent litigation and congressional lobbying on behalf of his father; the patent rights generated $15 million annually in royalties until their expiration in 1856.

==== Riverdale ====
In 1852, Woodworth speculated on real estate north of New York City near the Hudson River Railroad Line with his business partners Henry L. Atherton, Samuel Babcock, and Charles Foster. They bought a 100-acre (0.40 km^{2}) tract on Independence Avenue where Woodworth constructed an Italianate-style villa. His partners and himself laid out plans for a community of villas and country lanes and named their development Riverdale. The initial investments for their personal property resulted in further homes being constructed by others, including villas that became known as "The Park-Riverdale", as well as the construction of Stonehurst Mansion for the Colgates. Other eventual, notable residents included Henry F. Spaulding, William Appleton, William Duke, Laura Harriman, Percy R. Pyne, and Moses Taylor Pyne.

=== Death ===
He died in Yonkers, New York as on February 13, 1873, and was interred in Oakland Cemetery.

U.S. House of Representatives
Preceded by Richard D. Davis	Member of the U.S. House of Representatives from New York's 8th congressional district 1845–1847	Succeeded by Cornelius Warren
