= Shekomeko, New York =

Former hamlet in New York state

Coordinates: 41°55′41″N 73°35′56″W

Shekomeko (41°55'41"N 73°35'58"W) was a historic hamlet in the southwestern part of the town of North East, New York, United States) in present-day Dutchess County. It was a village of the Mahican people. They lived by a stream which Anglo-Americans later named Shekomeko Creek, after their village. Shekomeko comes from Mahikanneuw (language of the Muhhecanneok/Mahikanneok, "Mahikanak" or Mahikan/Mohican people) and means "people of the place of eels ["linear fish"], from "shaxk" - linear, straight; "amek" = fish; = locative suffix "ink", + ethnonymial locative suffix "oik" - Shaxkaminkoik > Shekomeko.

In 1740, Moravians from Bethlehem, Pennsylvania, founded a Moravian mission at Shekomeko. Slowly they began to convert the Mahican, and in 1743 built a chapel. With their conversions, the Mahican community became the first Native American Christian congregation in the present-day United States.

Some of the colonists resented the Moravians' work on behalf of the Mahican; others accused them of being secret Jesuits who were working to rouse the Mahican against the settlers on the side of the French. The New York colony had passed a law against the Roman Catholic Jesuits in 1700.

The Moravians were called before colonial government officials in Poughkeepsie, but supporters also testified on their behalf. The colonial government finally expelled them from New York at the end of 1744, "under the pretense of being in league with the French". One of the missionaries died in early 1745 and was buried at Shekomeko. Disheartened, the Mahican left the settlement and went to other areas, and the English colonists took over the Mahican land.

Located by County Route 83, the hamlet of Bethel is now located there, in the town of Pine Plains, formed in 1823 from part of North East.

== See also ==
- Moravian mission at Shekomeko
- American Provinces of the Moravian Church
- History of the Moravian Church
