= New York's congressional delegations =

These are tables of congressional delegations from New York to the United States House of Representatives and the United States Senate.

The dean of the New York delegation is Senate Minority Leader Chuck Schumer (D-Brooklyn), who has served in Congress since 1981, in the Senate since 1999, and as the leader of the Senate Democratic Caucus since 2017.

== United States Senate ==
Current U.S. senators from New York
New York CPVI (2025): D+8	Class I senator	Class III senator
New York CPVI (2025): D+8	Kirsten Gillibrand (Junior senator) (Albany)	Chuck Schumer (Senior senator) (Brooklyn)
Party	Democratic	Democratic
Incumbent since	January 26, 2009	January 3, 1999

Class I senator	Congress	Class III senator
Philip Schuyler (PA)	1st (1789–1791)	Rufus King (PA)
Aaron Burr (AA)	2nd (1791–1793)	Rufus King (PA)
Aaron Burr (AA)	3rd (1793–1795)	Rufus King (PA)
Aaron Burr (DR)	4th (1795–1797)	Rufus King (F)
Aaron Burr (DR)	4th (1795–1797)	John Laurance (F)
Philip Schuyler (F)	5th (1797–1799)	John Laurance (F)
John Sloss Hobart (F)	5th (1797–1799)	John Laurance (F)
William North (F)	5th (1797–1799)	John Laurance (F)
James Watson (F)	5th (1797–1799)	John Laurance (F)
James Watson (F)	6th (1799–1801)	John Laurance (F)
Gouverneur Morris (F)	6th (1799–1801)	John Armstrong Jr. (DR)
Gouverneur Morris (F)	7th (1801–1803)	John Armstrong Jr. (DR)
Gouverneur Morris (F)	7th (1801–1803)	DeWitt Clinton (DR)
Theodorus Bailey (DR)	8th (1803–1805)	John Armstrong Jr. (DR)
John Armstrong Jr. (DR)	8th (1803–1805)	John Smith (DR)
Samuel L. Mitchill (DR)	8th (1803–1805)	John Smith (DR)
Samuel L. Mitchill (DR)	9th (1805–1807)	John Smith (DR)
Samuel L. Mitchill (DR)	10th (1807–1809)	John Smith (DR)
Obadiah German (DR)	11th (1809–1811)	John Smith (DR)
Obadiah German (DR)	12th (1811–1813)	John Smith (DR)
Obadiah German (DR)	13th (1813–1815)	Rufus King (F)
Nathan Sanford (DR)	14th (1815–1817)	Rufus King (F)
Nathan Sanford (DR)	15th (1817–1819)	Rufus King (F)
Nathan Sanford (DR)	16th (1819–1821)	Rufus King (F)
Martin Van Buren (DR)	17th (1821–1823)	Rufus King (F)
Martin Van Buren (DR)	18th (1823–1825)	Rufus King (F)
Martin Van Buren (J)	19th (1825–1827)	vacant
Martin Van Buren (J)	19th (1825–1827)	Nathan Sanford (NR)
Martin Van Buren (J)	20th (1827–1829)	Nathan Sanford (NR)
Charles E. Dudley (J)	20th (1827–1829)	Nathan Sanford (NR)
Charles E. Dudley (J)	21st (1829–1831)	Nathan Sanford (NR)
Charles E. Dudley (J)	22nd (1831–1833)	William L. Marcy (J)
Nathaniel P. Tallmadge (J)	23rd (1833–1835)	Silas Wright (J)
Nathaniel P. Tallmadge (J)	24th (1835–1837)	Silas Wright (J)
Nathaniel P. Tallmadge (D)	25th (1837–1839)	Silas Wright (D)
Nathaniel P. Tallmadge (D)	26th (1839–1841)	Silas Wright (D)
Nathaniel P. Tallmadge (D)	27th (1841–1843)	Silas Wright (D)
Daniel S. Dickinson (D)	28th (1843–1845)	Henry A. Foster (D)
Daniel S. Dickinson (D)	29th (1845–1847)	John Adams Dix (D)
Daniel S. Dickinson (D)	30th (1847–1849)	John Adams Dix (D)
Daniel S. Dickinson (D)	31st (1849–1851)	William H. Seward (W)
Hamilton Fish (W)	32nd (1851–1853)	William H. Seward (W)
Hamilton Fish (W)	33rd (1853–1855)	William H. Seward (W)
Hamilton Fish (W)	34th (1855–1857)	William H. Seward (R)
Preston King (R)	35th (1857–1859)	William H. Seward (R)
Preston King (R)	36th (1859–1861)	William H. Seward (R)
Preston King (R)	37th (1861–1863)	Ira Harris (R)
Edwin D. Morgan (R)	38th (1863–1865)	Ira Harris (R)
Edwin D. Morgan (R)	39th (1865–1867)	Ira Harris (R)
Edwin D. Morgan (R)	40th (1867–1869)	Roscoe Conkling (R)
Reuben Fenton (R)	41st (1869–1871)	Roscoe Conkling (R)
Reuben Fenton (R)	42nd (1871–1873)	Roscoe Conkling (R)
Reuben Fenton (R)	43rd (1873–1875)	Roscoe Conkling (R)
Francis Kernan (D)	44th (1875–1877)	Roscoe Conkling (R)
Francis Kernan (D)	45th (1877–1879)	Roscoe Conkling (R)
Francis Kernan (D)	46th (1879–1881)	Roscoe Conkling (R)
Thomas C. Platt (R)	47th (1881–1883)	Roscoe Conkling (R)
Warner Miller (R)	47th (1881–1883)	Elbridge G. Lapham (R)
Warner Miller (R)	48th (1883–1885)	Elbridge G. Lapham (R)
Warner Miller (R)	49th (1885–1887)	William M. Evarts (R)
Frank Hiscock (R)	50th (1887–1889)	William M. Evarts (R)
Frank Hiscock (R)	51st (1889–1891)	William M. Evarts (R)
Frank Hiscock (R)	52nd (1891–1893)	David B. Hill (D)
Edward Murphy Jr. (D)	53rd (1893–1895)	David B. Hill (D)
Edward Murphy Jr. (D)	54th (1895–1897)	David B. Hill (D)
Edward Murphy Jr. (D)	55th (1897–1899)	Thomas C. Platt (R)
Chauncey Depew (R)	56th (1899–1901)	Thomas C. Platt (R)
Chauncey Depew (R)	57th (1901–1903)	Thomas C. Platt (R)
Chauncey Depew (R)	58th (1903–1905)	Thomas C. Platt (R)
Chauncey Depew (R)	59th (1905–1907)	Thomas C. Platt (R)
Chauncey Depew (R)	60th (1907–1909)	Thomas C. Platt (R)
Chauncey Depew (R)	61st (1909–1911)	Elihu Root (R)
James A. O'Gorman (D)	62nd (1911–1913)	Elihu Root (R)
James A. O'Gorman (D)	63rd (1913–1915)	Elihu Root (R)
James A. O'Gorman (D)	64th (1915–1917)	James W. Wadsworth Jr. (R)
William M. Calder (R)	65th (1917–1919)	James W. Wadsworth Jr. (R)
William M. Calder (R)	66th (1919–1921)	James W. Wadsworth Jr. (R)
William M. Calder (R)	67th (1921–1923)	James W. Wadsworth Jr. (R)
Royal S. Copeland (D)	68th (1923–1925)	James W. Wadsworth Jr. (R)
Royal S. Copeland (D)	69th (1925–1927)	James W. Wadsworth Jr. (R)
Royal S. Copeland (D)	70th (1927–1929)	Robert F. Wagner (D)
Royal S. Copeland (D)	71st (1929–1931)	Robert F. Wagner (D)
Royal S. Copeland (D)	72nd (1931–1933)	Robert F. Wagner (D)
Royal S. Copeland (D)	73rd (1933–1935)	Robert F. Wagner (D)
Royal S. Copeland (D)	74th (1935–1937)	Robert F. Wagner (D)
Royal S. Copeland (D)	75th (1937–1939)	Robert F. Wagner (D)
James M. Mead (D)	75th (1937–1939)	Robert F. Wagner (D)
James M. Mead (D)	76th (1939–1941)	Robert F. Wagner (D)
James M. Mead (D)	77th (1941–1943)	Robert F. Wagner (D)
James M. Mead (D)	78th (1943–1945)	Robert F. Wagner (D)
James M. Mead (D)	79th (1945–1947)	Robert F. Wagner (D)
Irving Ives (R)	80th (1947–1949)	Robert F. Wagner (D)
Irving Ives (R)	81st (1949–1951)	Robert F. Wagner (D)
Irving Ives (R)	81st (1949–1951)	John Foster Dulles (R)
Irving Ives (R)	81st (1949–1951)	Herbert H. Lehman (D)
Irving Ives (R)	82nd (1951–1953)	Herbert H. Lehman (D)
Irving Ives (R)	83rd (1953–1955)	Herbert H. Lehman (D)
Irving Ives (R)	84th (1955–1957)	Herbert H. Lehman (D)
Irving Ives (R)	85th (1957–1959)	Jacob Javits (R)
Kenneth Keating (R)	86th (1959–1961)	Jacob Javits (R)
Kenneth Keating (R)	87th (1961–1963)	Jacob Javits (R)
Kenneth Keating (R)	88th (1963–1965)	Jacob Javits (R)
Robert F. Kennedy (D)	89th (1965–1967)	Jacob Javits (R)
Robert F. Kennedy (D)	90th (1967–1969)	Jacob Javits (R)
Charles Goodell (R)	90th (1967–1969)	Jacob Javits (R)
Charles Goodell (R)	91st (1969–1971)	Jacob Javits (R)
James L. Buckley (Con)	92nd (1971–1973)	Jacob Javits (R)
James L. Buckley (Con)	93rd (1973–1975)	Jacob Javits (R)
James L. Buckley (Con)	94th (1975–1977)	Jacob Javits (R)
Daniel Patrick; Moynihan (D)	95th (1977–1979)	Jacob Javits (R)
Daniel Patrick; Moynihan (D)	96th (1979–1981)	Jacob Javits (R)
Daniel Patrick; Moynihan (D)	97th (1981–1983)	Al D'Amato (R)
Daniel Patrick; Moynihan (D)	98th (1983–1985)	Al D'Amato (R)
Daniel Patrick; Moynihan (D)	99th (1985–1987)	Al D'Amato (R)
Daniel Patrick; Moynihan (D)	100th (1987–1989)	Al D'Amato (R)
Daniel Patrick; Moynihan (D)	101st (1989–1991)	Al D'Amato (R)
Daniel Patrick; Moynihan (D)	102nd (1991–1993)	Al D'Amato (R)
Daniel Patrick; Moynihan (D)	103rd (1993–1995)	Al D'Amato (R)
Daniel Patrick; Moynihan (D)	104th (1995–1997)	Al D'Amato (R)
Daniel Patrick; Moynihan (D)	105th (1997–1999)	Al D'Amato (R)
Daniel Patrick; Moynihan (D)	106th (1999–2001)	Chuck Schumer (D)
Hillary Clinton (D)	107th (2001–2003)	Chuck Schumer (D)
Hillary Clinton (D)	108th (2003–2005)	Chuck Schumer (D)
Hillary Clinton (D)	109th (2005–2007)	Chuck Schumer (D)
Hillary Clinton (D)	110th (2007–2009)	Chuck Schumer (D)
Hillary Clinton (D)	111th (2009–2011)	Chuck Schumer (D)
Kirsten Gillibrand (D)	111th (2009–2011)	Chuck Schumer (D)
Kirsten Gillibrand (D)	112th (2011–2013)	Chuck Schumer (D)
Kirsten Gillibrand (D)	113th (2013–2015)	Chuck Schumer (D)
Kirsten Gillibrand (D)	114th (2015–2017)	Chuck Schumer (D)
Kirsten Gillibrand (D)	115th (2017–2019)	Chuck Schumer (D)
Kirsten Gillibrand (D)	116th (2019–2021)	Chuck Schumer (D)
Kirsten Gillibrand (D)	117th (2021–2023)	Chuck Schumer (D)
Kirsten Gillibrand (D)	118th (2023–2025)	Chuck Schumer (D)
Kirsten Gillibrand (D)	119th (2025–2027)	Chuck Schumer (D)
Kirsten Gillibrand (D)	120th (2027–2029)	Chuck Schumer (D)

== U.S. House of Representatives ==
=== Current members ===
This is a list of members of the current New York delegation in the U.S. House, along with their respective tenures in office, district boundaries, and district political ratings according to the CPVI. The delegation has a total of 26 members. As of January 2026, the delegation consists of 19 Democrats and seven Republicans.

Current U.S. representatives from New York
Region	District	Member (Residence)	Party	Incumbent since	CPVI (2025)	District map
Suburban Long Island	1st	Nick LaLota (Amityville)	Republican	January 3, 2023	R+4	
Suburban Long Island	2nd	Andrew Garbarino (Bayport)	Republican	January 3, 2021	R+6	
Suburban Long Island	3rd	Tom Suozzi (Glen Cove)	Democratic	February 13, 2024	EVEN	
Suburban Long Island	4th	Laura Gillen (Rockville Centre)	Democratic	January 3, 2025	D+2	
New York City	5th	Gregory Meeks (Queens)	Democratic	February 3, 1998	D+24	
New York City	6th	Grace Meng (Queens)	Democratic	January 3, 2013	D+6	
New York City	7th	Nydia Velázquez (Brooklyn)	Democratic	January 3, 1993	D+25	
New York City	8th	Hakeem Jeffries (Brooklyn)	Democratic	January 3, 2013	D+24	
New York City	9th	Yvette Clarke (Brooklyn)	Democratic	January 3, 2007	D+22	
New York City	10th	Dan Goldman (Manhattan)	Democratic	January 3, 2023	D+32	
New York City	11th	Nicole Malliotakis (Staten Island)	Republican	January 3, 2021	R+10	
New York City	12th	Jerry Nadler (Manhattan)	Democratic	November 3, 1992	D+33	
New York City	13th	Adriano Espaillat (Manhattan)	Democratic	January 3, 2017	D+32	
New York City	14th	Alexandria Ocasio-Cortez (Queens)	Democratic	January 3, 2019	D+19	
New York City	15th	Ritchie Torres (The Bronx)	Democratic	January 3, 2021	D+27	
North of NYC	16th	George Latimer (Rye)	Democratic	January 3, 2025	D+18	
North of NYC	17th	Mike Lawler (Pearl River)	Republican	January 3, 2023	D+1	
North of NYC	18th	Pat Ryan (Gardiner)	Democratic	September 13, 2022	D+2	
North of NYC	19th	Josh Riley (Ithaca)	Democratic	January 3, 2025	D+1	
North of NYC	20th	Paul Tonko (Amsterdam)	Democratic	January 3, 2009	D+8	
North of NYC	21st	Elise Stefanik (Schuylerville)	Republican	January 3, 2015	R+10	
North of NYC	22nd	John Mannion (Geddes)	Democratic	January 3, 2025	D+4	
North of NYC	23rd	Nick Langworthy (Pendleton)	Republican	January 3, 2023	R+10	
North of NYC	24th	Claudia Tenney (Cleveland)	Republican	February 11, 2021	R+11	
North of NYC	25th	Joseph Morelle (Irondequoit)	Democratic	November 13, 2018	D+10	
North of NYC	26th	Tim Kennedy (Buffalo)	Democratic	April 30, 2024	D+11	

=== 1789–1793: 6 seats ===
Congress	District					
Congress	1st	2nd	3rd	4th	5th	6th
1st (1789–1791)	William Floyd (AA)	John; Laurance (PA)	Egbert; Benson (PA)	John Hathorn (AA)	Peter; Silvester (PA)	Jeremiah Van; Rensselaer (AA)
2nd (1791–1793)	vacant	John; Laurance (PA)	Egbert; Benson (PA)	Cornelius C. Schoonmaker (AA)	Peter; Silvester (PA)	James; Gordon (PA)
2nd (1791–1793)	Thomas Tredwell (AA)	John; Laurance (PA)	Egbert; Benson (PA)	Cornelius C. Schoonmaker (AA)	Peter; Silvester (PA)	James; Gordon (PA)

=== 1793–1803: 10 seats ===
Congress	District									
Congress	1st	2nd	3rd	4th	5th	6th	7th	8th	9th	10th
3rd (1793–1795)	Thomas; Treadwell (AA)	John Watts (PA)	Philip Van; Cortlandt (AA)	Peter Van; Gaasbeck (PA)	Theodorus Bailey (AA)	Ezekiel; Gilbert (PA)	John Evert; Van Alen (PA)	Henry Glen (PA)	James; Gordon (PA)	Silas Talbot (PA)
4th (1795–1797)	Jonathan Nicoll; Havens (DR)	Edward; Livingston (DR)	Philip Van; Cortlandt (DR)	John Hathorn (DR)	Theodorus Bailey (DR)	Ezekiel Gilbert (F)	John Evert; Van Alen (F)	Henry Glen (F)	John Williams (DR)	William Cooper (F)
5th (1797–1799)	Jonathan Nicoll; Havens (DR)	Edward; Livingston (DR)	Philip Van; Cortlandt (DR)	Lucas; Elmendorf (DR)	David Brooks (F)	Hezekiah L. Hosmer (F)	John Evert; Van Alen (F)	Henry Glen (F)	John Williams (F)	James Cochran (F)
6th (1799–1801)	Jonathan Nicoll; Havens (DR)	Edward; Livingston (DR)	Philip Van; Cortlandt (DR)	Lucas; Elmendorf (DR)	Theodorus Bailey (DR)	John Bird (F)	John; Thompson (DR)	Henry Glen (F)	Jonas Platt (F)	William Cooper (F)
6th (1799–1801)	John Smith (DR)	Edward; Livingston (DR)	Philip Van; Cortlandt (DR)	Lucas; Elmendorf (DR)	Theodorus Bailey (DR)	John Bird (F)	John; Thompson (DR)	Henry Glen (F)	Jonas Platt (F)	William Cooper (F)
7th (1801–1803)	John Smith (DR)	Samuel L. Mitchill (DR)	Philip Van; Cortlandt (DR)	Lucas; Elmendorf (DR)	Thomas Tillotson (DR)	John Bird (F)	David; Thomas (DR)	Killian K. Van; Rensselaer (F)	Benjamin; Walker (F)	Thomas Morris (F)
7th (1801–1803)	John Smith (DR)	Samuel L. Mitchill (DR)	Philip Van; Cortlandt (DR)	Lucas; Elmendorf (DR)	Theodorus Bailey (DR)	John Peter; Van Ness (DR)	David; Thomas (DR)	Killian K. Van; Rensselaer (F)	Benjamin; Walker (F)	Thomas Morris (F)

=== 1803–1813: 17 seats ===
From 1805 to 1809, the 2nd and 3rd districts jointly elected 2 representatives.

Congress	District										District						
Congress	1st	2nd	3rd	4th	5th	6th	7th	8th	9th	10th	11th	12th	13th	14th	15th	16th	17th
8th (1803–1805)	John Smith (DR)	Joshua Sands (F)	Samuel L. Mitchill (DR)	Philip Van Cortlandt (DR)	Andrew McCord (DR)	Isaac Bloom (DR)	Josiah Hasbrouck (DR)	Henry W. Livingston (F)	Killian Van Rensselaer (F)	George Tibbits (F)	Beriah Palmer (DR)	David Thomas (DR)	Thomas Sammons (DR)	Erastus Root (DR)	Gaylord Griswold (F)	John Paterson (DR)	Oliver Phelps (DR)
8th (1803–1805)	Samuel Riker (DR)	Joshua Sands (F)	George Clinton Jr. (DR)	Philip Van Cortlandt (DR)	Andrew McCord (DR)	Daniel C. Verplanck (DR)	Josiah Hasbrouck (DR)	Henry W. Livingston (F)	Killian Van Rensselaer (F)	George Tibbits (F)	Beriah Palmer (DR)	David Thomas (DR)	Thomas Sammons (DR)	Erastus Root (DR)	Gaylord Griswold (F)	John Paterson (DR)	Oliver Phelps (DR)
9th (1805–1807)	Eliphalet Wickes (DR)	2nd and 3rd (2 seats)		Philip Van Cortlandt (DR)	John Blake Jr. (DR)	Daniel C. Verplanck (DR)	Martin G. Schuneman (DR)	Henry W. Livingston (F)	Killian Van Rensselaer (F)	Josiah Masters (DR)	Peter Sailly (DR)	David Thomas (DR)	Thomas Sammons (DR)	John Russell (DR)	Nathan Williams (DR)	Uri Tracy (DR)	Silas Halsey (DR)
9th (1805–1807)	Eliphalet Wickes (DR)	Gurdon S. Mumford (DR)	George Clinton Jr. (DR)	Philip Van Cortlandt (DR)	John Blake Jr. (DR)	Daniel C. Verplanck (DR)	Martin G. Schuneman (DR)	Henry W. Livingston (F)	Killian Van Rensselaer (F)	Josiah Masters (DR)	Peter Sailly (DR)	David Thomas (DR)	Thomas Sammons (DR)	John Russell (DR)	Nathan Williams (DR)	Uri Tracy (DR)	Silas Halsey (DR)
10th (1807–1809)	Samuel Riker (DR)	Gurdon S. Mumford (DR)	George Clinton Jr. (DR)	Philip Van Cortlandt (DR)	John Blake Jr. (DR)	Daniel C. Verplanck (DR)	Barent Gardenier (F)	James I. Van Alen (DR)	Killian Van Rensselaer (F)	Josiah Masters (DR)	John Thompson (DR)	David Thomas (DR)	Peter Swart (DR)	John Russell (DR)	William Kirkpatrick (DR Quid)	Reuben Humphrey (DR)	John Harris (DR)
10th (1807–1809)	Samuel Riker (DR)	Gurdon S. Mumford (DR)	George Clinton Jr. (DR)	Philip Van Cortlandt (DR)	John Blake Jr. (DR)	Daniel C. Verplanck (DR)	Barent Gardenier (F)	James I. Van Alen (DR)	Killian Van Rensselaer (F)	Josiah Masters (DR)	John Thompson (DR)	Nathan Wilson (DR)	Peter Swart (DR)	John Russell (DR)	William Kirkpatrick (DR Quid)	Reuben Humphrey (DR)	John Harris (DR)

Congress	District										District						
Congress	1st	2nd (2 seats)		3rd	4th	5th	6th (2 seats)		7th	8th	9th	10th	11th	12th	13th	14th	15th
11th (1809–1811)	Ebenezer Sage (DR)	Gurdon S. Mumford (DR)	William Denning (DR)	Jonathan Fisk (DR)	James Emott (F)	Barent Gardenier (F)	Herman Knickerbocker (F)	Robert Le Roy Livingston (F)	Killian Van Rensselaer (F)	John Thompson (DR)	Thomas Sammons (DR)	John Nicholson (DR)	Thomas R. Gold (F)	Erastus Root (DR)	Uri Tracy (DR)	Vincent Mathews (F)	Peter Buell Porter (DR)
11th (1809–1811)	Ebenezer Sage (DR)	Gurdon S. Mumford (DR)	Samuel L. Mitchill (DR)	Jonathan Fisk (DR)	James Emott (F)	Barent Gardenier (F)	Herman Knickerbocker (F)	Robert Le Roy Livingston (F)	Killian Van Rensselaer (F)	John Thompson (DR)	Thomas Sammons (DR)	John Nicholson (DR)	Thomas R. Gold (F)	Erastus Root (DR)	Uri Tracy (DR)	Vincent Mathews (F)	Peter Buell Porter (DR)
12th (1811–1813)	Ebenezer Sage (DR)	William Paulding Jr. (DR)	Samuel L. Mitchill (DR)	Pierre Van Cortlandt Jr. (DR)	James Emott (F)	Thomas B. Cooke (DR)	Asa Fitch (F)	Robert Le Roy Livingston (F)	Harmanus Bleecker (F)	Benjamin Pond (DR)	Thomas Sammons (DR)	Silas Stow (DR)	Thomas R. Gold (F)	Arunah Metcalf (DR)	Uri Tracy (DR)	Daniel Avery (DR)	Peter Buell Porter (DR)
12th (1811–1813)	Ebenezer Sage (DR)	William Paulding Jr. (DR)	Samuel L. Mitchill (DR)	Pierre Van Cortlandt Jr. (DR)	James Emott (F)	Thomas B. Cooke (DR)	Asa Fitch (F)	Thomas P. Grosvenor (F)	Harmanus Bleecker (F)	Benjamin Pond (DR)	Thomas Sammons (DR)	Silas Stow (DR)	Thomas R. Gold (F)	Arunah Metcalf (DR)	Uri Tracy (DR)	Daniel Avery (DR)	Peter Buell Porter (DR)

=== 1813–1823: 27 seats ===
Congress
13th
(1813–1815)
14th
(1815–1817)
15th
(1817–1819)
16th
(1819–1821)
17th
(1821–1823)

District										District										District							Congress
1st (2 seats)		2nd (2 seats)		3rd	4th	5th	6th	7th	8th	9th	10th	11th	12th (2 seats)		13th	14th	15th (2 seats)		16th	17th	18th	19th	20th (2 seats)		21st (2 seats until 1821)		Congress
Ebenezer; Sage (DR)	John; Lefferts (DR)	Egbert; Benson (F)	Jotham; Post Jr. (F)	Peter; Denoyelles (DR)	Thomas J. Oakley (F)	Thomas P. Grosvenor (F)	Jonathan; Fisk (DR)	Abraham J. Hasbrouck (DR)	Samuel; Sherwood (F)	John; Lovett (F)	Hosea; Moffitt (F)	John; W. Taylor (DR)	Zebulon R. Shipherd (F)	Elisha I. Winter (F)	Alexander; Boyd (F)	Jacob; Markell (F)	John M. Bowers (F)	Joel; Thompson (F)	Morris; S. Miller (F)	William; Stephens; Smith (F)	Moss; Kent (F)	James; Geddes (F)	Daniel; Avery (DR)	Oliver C. Comstock (DR)	Samuel M. Hopkins (F)	Nathaniel; W. Howell (F)	13th (1813–1815)
Ebenezer; Sage (DR)	John; Lefferts (DR)	William; Irving (DR)	Jotham; Post Jr. (F)	Peter; Denoyelles (DR)	Thomas J. Oakley (F)	Thomas P. Grosvenor (F)	Jonathan; Fisk (DR)	Abraham J. Hasbrouck (DR)	Samuel; Sherwood (F)	John; Lovett (F)	Hosea; Moffitt (F)	John; W. Taylor (DR)	Zebulon R. Shipherd (F)	Elisha I. Winter (F)	Alexander; Boyd (F)	Jacob; Markell (F)	Isaac Wil- liams Jr. (DR)	Joel; Thompson (F)	Morris; S. Miller (F)	William; Stephens; Smith (F)	Moss; Kent (F)	James; Geddes (F)	Daniel; Avery (DR)	Oliver C. Comstock (DR)	Samuel M. Hopkins (F)	Nathaniel; W. Howell (F)	13th (1813–1815)
Henry; Crocheron (DR)	George; Townsend (DR)	William; Irving (DR)	Peter H. Wendover (DR)	Jonathan; Ward (DR)	Abraham H. Schenck (DR)	Thomas P. Grosvenor (F)	Jonathan; Fisk (DR)	Samuel; Betts (DR)	John; Adams (DR)	John; Lovett (F)	Hosea; Moffitt (F)	John; W. Taylor (DR)	Asa; Adgate (DR)	John; Savage (DR)	John B. Yates (DR)	Daniel; Cady (F)	James; Birdsall (DR)	Jabez; Delano; Hammond (DR)	Thomas; R. Gold (F)	Westel; Willoughby; Jr. (DR)	Moss; Kent (F)	Victory; Birdseye (DR)	Enos T. Throop (DR)	Oliver C. Comstock (DR)	Micah; Brooks (DR)	Peter Buell; Porter (DR)	14th (1815–1817)
Henry; Crocheron (DR)	George; Townsend (DR)	William; Irving (DR)	Peter H. Wendover (DR)	Jonathan; Ward (DR)	Abraham H. Schenck (DR)	Thomas P. Grosvenor (F)	James W. Wilkin (DR)	Samuel; Betts (DR)	Erastus; Root (DR)	John; Lovett (F)	Hosea; Moffitt (F)	John; W. Taylor (DR)	Asa; Adgate (DR)	John; Savage (DR)	John B. Yates (DR)	Daniel; Cady (F)	James; Birdsall (DR)	Jabez; Delano; Hammond (DR)	Thomas; R. Gold (F)	Westel; Willoughby; Jr. (DR)	Moss; Kent (F)	Victory; Birdseye (DR)	Daniel; Avery (DR)	Oliver C. Comstock (DR)	Micah; Brooks (DR)	Archibald S. Clarke (DR)	14th (1815–1817)
Tredwell; Scudder (DR)	George; Townsend (DR)	William; Irving (DR)	Peter H. Wendover (DR)	Caleb; Tompkins (DR)	James Tall- madge Jr. (DR)	Philip J. Schuyler (F)	James W. Wilkin (DR)	Josiah Has- brouck (DR)	Dorrance; Kirtland (DR)	Rensselaer; Westerlo (F)	John P. Cushman (F)	John; W. Taylor (DR)	John; Palmer (DR)	John; Savage (DR)	Thomas; Lawyer (DR)	John Her- kimer (DR)	John R. Drake (DR)	Isaac Wil- liams Jr. (DR)	Henry; R. Storrs (F)	Thomas H. Hubbard (DR)	David A. Ogden (F)	James; Porter (DR)	Daniel; Cruger (DR)	Oliver C. Comstock (DR)	Benjamin; Ellicott (DR)	John; Spencer (DR)	15th (1817–1819)
Silas; Wood (DR)	Ebenezer; Sage (DR)	Henry; Meigs (DR)	Peter H. Wendover (DR)	Caleb; Tompkins (DR)	Randall S. Street (F)	James; Strong (F)	Walter; Case (DR)	Jacob H. De Witt (DR)	Robert; Clark (DR)	Solomon Van; Rensselaer (F)	John Dean; Dickinson (F)	John; W. Taylor (DR)	Ezra C. Gross (DR)	Nathaniel; Pitcher (DR)	Harmanus; Peek (DR)	John; Fay (DR)	Joseph S. Lyman (DR)	Robert; Monell (DR)	Henry; R. Storrs (F)	Aaron; Hackley; Jr. (DR)	William; Donnison; Ford (DR)	George; Hall (DR)	Caleb; Baker (DR)	Jonathan; Richmond (DR)	Nathaniel; Allen (DR)	Albert H. Tracy (DR)	16th (1819–1821)
Silas; Wood (DR)	James; Guyon Jr. (DR)	Henry; Meigs (DR)	Peter H. Wendover (DR)	Caleb; Tompkins (DR)	Randall S. Street (F)	James; Strong (F)	Walter; Case (DR)	Jacob H. De Witt (DR)	Robert; Clark (DR)	Solomon Van; Rensselaer (F)	John Dean; Dickinson (F)	John; W. Taylor (DR)	Ezra C. Gross (DR)	Nathaniel; Pitcher (DR)	Harmanus; Peek (DR)	John; Fay (DR)	Joseph S. Lyman (DR)	Robert; Monell (DR)	Henry; R. Storrs (F)	Aaron; Hackley; Jr. (DR)	William; Donnison; Ford (DR)	George; Hall (DR)	Caleb; Baker (DR)	Jonathan; Richmond (DR)	Nathaniel; Allen (DR)	Albert H. Tracy (DR)	16th (1819–1821)
Silas; Wood (DR)	Peter Sharpe (DR)	Churchill C. Cambreleng (DR)	John J. Morgan (DR)	Jeremiah; H. Pierson (DR)	William W. Van Wyck (DR)	Walter; Patterson (F)	Selah Tuthill (DR)	Charles H. Ruggles (F)	Richard; McCarty (DR)	Solomon Van; Rensselaer (F)	John Dean; Dickinson (F)	John; W. Taylor (DR)	Reuben H. Walworth (DR)	Nathaniel; Pitcher (DR)	John; Gebhard (F)	Alfred; Conkling (DR)	Samuel; Campbell (DR)	James; Hawkes (DR)	Joseph; Kirkland (F)	Thomas H. Hubbard (DR)	Micah; Sterling (F)	Elisha; Litchfield (DR)	William B. Rochester (DR)	David; Woodcock (DR)	Elijah; Spencer (DR)	Albert H. Tracy (DR)	17th (1821–1823)
Silas; Wood (DR)	Cadwallader D. Colden (F)	Churchill C. Cambreleng (DR)	John J. Morgan (DR)	Jeremiah; H. Pierson (DR)	William W. Van Wyck (DR)	Walter; Patterson (F)	Charles; Borland Jr. (DR)	Charles H. Ruggles (F)	Richard; McCarty (DR)	Stephen Van; Rensselaer (F)	John Dean; Dickinson (F)	John; W. Taylor (DR)	Reuben H. Walworth (DR)	Nathaniel; Pitcher (DR)	John; Gebhard (F)	Alfred; Conkling (DR)	Samuel; Campbell (DR)	James; Hawkes (DR)	Joseph; Kirkland (F)	Thomas H. Hubbard (DR)	Micah; Sterling (F)	Elisha; Litchfield (DR)	William B. Rochester (DR)	David; Woodcock (DR)	Elijah; Spencer (DR)	Albert H. Tracy (DR)	17th (1821–1823)

=== 1823–1833: 34 seats ===
Congress
18th
(1823–1825)
19th
(1825–1827)
20th
(1827–1829)
21st
(1829–1831)
22nd
(1831–1833)

District										District										District										District				Congress
1st	2nd	3rd (3 seats)			4th	5th	6th	7th	8th	9th	10th	11th	12th	13th	14th	15th	16th	17th	18th	19th	20th (2 seats)		21st	22nd	23rd	24th	25th	26th (2 seats)		27th	28th	29th	30th	Congress
Silas; Wood (DR) (Note: Supported the Adams-Clay faction in the 1824 United States presidential election.)	Jacob; Tyson (DR) (Note: Supported the Crawford faction in the 1824 United States presidential election.)	Churchill C. Cambreleng (DR)	John J. Morgan (DR) (Note: Supported the Jackson faction in the 1824 United States presidential election.)	Peter; Sharpe (DR)	Joel; Frost (DR)	William W. Van Wyck (DR)	Hector; Craig (DR)	Lemuel; Jenkins (DR)	James; Strong (F)	James L. Hogeboom (DR)	Stephen; Van; Rensselaer (F)	Charles; A. Foote (DR)	Lewis; Eaton (DR)	Isaac; Williams; Jr. (DR)	Henry R. Storrs (F)	John; Herkimer (DR)	John W. Cady (DR)	John; W. Taylor (DR)	Henry C. Martindale (F)	John; Richards (DR)	Ela; Collins (DR)	Egbert; Ten Eyck (DR)	Lot; Clark (DR)	Justin; Dwinell (DR)	Elisha; Litchfield (DR)	Rowland; Day (DR)	Samuel; Lawrence (DR)	Dudley; Marvin (DR)	Robert S. Rose (DR)	Moses; Hayden (DR)	William B. Rochester (DR)	Isaac; Wilson (DR)	Albert H. Tracy (DR)	18th 1823–1825
Silas; Wood (DR)	Jacob; Tyson (DR)	Churchill C. Cambreleng (DR)	John J. Morgan (DR)	Peter; Sharpe (DR)	Joel; Frost (DR)	William W. Van Wyck (DR)	Hector; Craig (DR)	Lemuel; Jenkins (DR)	James; Strong (F)	James L. Hogeboom (DR)	Stephen; Van; Rensselaer (F)	Charles; A. Foote (DR)	Lewis; Eaton (DR)	Isaac; Williams; Jr. (DR)	Henry R. Storrs (F)	John; Herkimer (DR)	John W. Cady (DR)	John; W. Taylor (DR)	Henry C. Martindale (F)	John; Richards (DR)	Ela; Collins (DR)	Egbert; Ten Eyck (DR)	Lot; Clark (DR)	Justin; Dwinell (DR)	Elisha; Litchfield (DR)	Rowland; Day (DR)	Samuel; Lawrence (DR)	Dudley; Marvin (DR)	Robert S. Rose (DR)	Moses; Hayden (DR)	William; Woods (DR)	Parmenio; Adams (DR)	Albert H. Tracy (DR)	18th 1823–1825
Silas; Wood (NR)	Joshua; Sands (NR)	Churchill C. Cambreleng (J)	Jeromus; Johnson (J)	Gulian C. Verplanck (J)	Aaron; Ward (NR)	Bartow; White (NR)	John; Hallock; Jr. (J)	Abraham; Bruyn; Hasbrouck (NR)	James; Strong (NR)	William; McManus (NR)	Stephen; Van; Rensselaer (NR)	Henry; Ashley (J)	William; Dietz (J)	William; G. Angel (NR)	Henry R. Storrs (NR)	Michael; Hoffman (J)	Henry; Markell (NR)	John; W. Taylor (NR)	Henry C. Martindale (NR)	Henry H. Ross (NR)	Nicoll; Fosdick (NR)	Egbert; Ten Eyck (J)	Elias; Whitmore (NR)	John; Miller (NR)	Luther; Badger (NR)	Charles; Kellogg (J)	Charles; Humphrey (NR)	Dudley; Marvin (NR)	Robert S. Rose (NR)	Moses; Hayden (NR)	Timothy H. Porter (NR)	Parmenio; Adams (NR)	Daniel G. Garnsey (NR)	19th 1825–1827
Silas; Wood (NR)	Joshua; Sands (NR)	Churchill C. Cambreleng (J)	Jeromus; Johnson (J)	Gulian C. Verplanck (J)	Aaron; Ward (NR)	Bartow; White (NR)	John; Hallock; Jr. (J)	Abraham; Bruyn; Hasbrouck (NR)	James; Strong (NR)	William; McManus (NR)	Stephen; Van; Rensselaer (NR)	Henry; Ashley (J)	William; Dietz (J)	William; G. Angel (NR)	Henry R. Storrs (NR)	Michael; Hoffman (J)	Henry; Markell (NR)	John; W. Taylor (NR)	Henry C. Martindale (NR)	Henry H. Ross (NR)	Nicoll; Fosdick (NR)	Daniel Hug- unin Jr. (NR)	Elias; Whitmore (NR)	John; Miller (NR)	Luther; Badger (NR)	Charles; Kellogg (J)	Charles; Humphrey (NR)	Dudley; Marvin (NR)	Robert S. Rose (NR)	Moses; Hayden (NR)	Timothy H. Porter (NR)	Parmenio; Adams (NR)	Daniel G. Garnsey (NR)	19th 1825–1827
Silas; Wood (NR)	John J. Wood (J)	Churchill C. Cambreleng (J)	Jeromus; Johnson (J)	Gulian C. Verplanck (J)	Aaron; Ward (NR)	Thomas J. Oakley (J)	John; Hallock; Jr. (J)	George O. Belden (J)	James; Strong (NR)	John; Dean; Dickinson (NR)	Stephen; Van; Rensselaer (NR)	Selah R. Hobbie (J)	John I. De Graff (J)	Samuel; Chase (NR)	Henry R. Storrs (NR)	Michael; Hoffman (J)	Henry; Markell (NR)	John; W. Taylor (NR)	Henry C. Martindale (NR)	Richard; Keese (J)	Rudolph; Bunner (J)	Silas; Wright (J)	John C. Clark (J)	John G. Stower (J)	Jonas; Earll Jr. (J)	Nathaniel; Garrow (J)	David; Woodcock (NR)	Dudley; Marvin (NR)	John; Maynard (NR)	Daniel D. Barnard (NR)	John; Magee (J)	David Ellicott; Evans (J)	Daniel G. Garnsey (NR)	20th 1827–1829
Silas; Wood (NR)	John J. Wood (J)	Churchill C. Cambreleng (J)	Jeromus; Johnson (J)	Gulian C. Verplanck (J)	Aaron; Ward (NR)	Thomas; Taber II (J)	John; Hallock; Jr. (J)	George O. Belden (J)	James; Strong (NR)	John; Dean; Dickinson (NR)	Stephen; Van; Rensselaer (NR)	Selah R. Hobbie (J)	John I. De Graff (J)	Samuel; Chase (NR)	Henry R. Storrs (NR)	Michael; Hoffman (J)	Henry; Markell (NR)	John; W. Taylor (NR)	Henry C. Martindale (NR)	Richard; Keese (J)	Rudolph; Bunner (J)	Silas; Wright (J)	John C. Clark (J)	John G. Stower (J)	Jonas; Earll Jr. (J)	Nathaniel; Garrow (J)	David; Woodcock (NR)	Dudley; Marvin (NR)	John; Maynard (NR)	Daniel D. Barnard (NR)	John; Magee (J)	Phineas L. Tracy (NR)	Daniel G. Garnsey (NR)	20th 1827–1829
James; Lent (J)	Jacob; Crocheron (J)	Churchill C. Cambreleng (J)	Campbell; P. White (J)	Gulian C. Verplanck (J)	Henry B. Cowles (NR)	Abraham; Bockee (J)	Hector; Craig (J)	Charles G. DeWitt (J)	James; Strong (NR)	John; Dean; Dickinson (NR)	Ambrose; Spencer (NR)	Perkins; King (J)	Peter I. Borst (J)	William; G. Angel (J)	Henry R. Storrs (NR)	Michael; Hoffman (J)	Benedict; Arnold (NR)	John; W. Taylor (NR)	Henry C. Martindale (NR)	Isaac; Finch (NR)	Joseph; Hawkins (NR)	George; Fisher (NR)	Robert; Monell (J)	Thomas; Beekman (NR)	Jonas; Earll Jr. (J)	Gershom; Powers (J)	Thomas; Maxwell (J)	Jehiel H. Halsey (J)	Robert S. Rose (A-M)	Timothy; Childs (A-M)	John; Magee (J)	Phineas L. Tracy (A-M)	Ebenezer F. Norton (J)	21st 1829–1831
James; Lent (J)	Jacob; Crocheron (J)	Churchill C. Cambreleng (J)	Campbell; P. White (J)	Gulian C. Verplanck (J)	Henry B. Cowles (NR)	Abraham; Bockee (J)	Samuel W. Eager (NR)	Charles G. DeWitt (J)	James; Strong (NR)	John; Dean; Dickinson (NR)	Ambrose; Spencer (NR)	Perkins; King (J)	Peter I. Borst (J)	William; G. Angel (J)	Henry R. Storrs (NR)	Michael; Hoffman (J)	Benedict; Arnold (NR)	John; W. Taylor (NR)	Henry C. Martindale (NR)	Isaac; Finch (NR)	Joseph; Hawkins (NR)	Jonah; Sanford (J)	Robert; Monell (J)	Thomas; Beekman (NR)	Jonas; Earll Jr. (J)	Gershom; Powers (J)	Thomas; Maxwell (J)	Jehiel H. Halsey (J)	Robert S. Rose (A-M)	Timothy; Childs (A-M)	John; Magee (J)	Phineas L. Tracy (A-M)	Ebenezer F. Norton (J)	21st 1829–1831
James; Lent (J)	John T. Bergen (J)	Churchill C. Cambreleng (J)	Campbell; P. White (J)	Gulian C. Verplanck (J)	Aaron; Ward (J)	Edmund H. Pendleton (NR)	Samuel J. Wilkin (NR)	John C. Brodhead (J)	John; King (J)	Job; Pierson (J)	Gerrit Y. Lansing (J)	Erastus; Root (J)	Joseph; Bouck (J)	William; G. Angel (J)	Samuel; Beardsley (J)	Michael; Hoffman (J)	Nathan; Soule (J)	John; W. Taylor (NR)	Nathaniel; Pitcher (J)	William; Hogan (J)	Charles; Dayan (J)	Daniel; Wardwell (J)	John A. Collier (A-M)	Edward C. Reed (J)	Freeborn G. Jewett (J)	Ulysses F. Doubleday (J)	Gamaliel H. Barstow (A-M)	William Bab- cock (A-M)	John Dick- son (A-M)	Frederick Whit- tlesey (A-M)	Grattan H. Wheeler (A-M)	Phineas L. Tracy (A-M)	Bates; Cooke (A-M)	22nd 1831–1833

=== 1833–1843: 40 seats ===
Congress
23rd
(1833–1835)
24th
(1835–1837)
25th
(1837–1839)
26th
(1839–1841)
27th
(1841–1843)

District										District										District										District										Congress
1st	2nd	3rd (4 seats)				4th	5th	6th	7th	8th (2 seats)		9th	10th	11th	12th	13th	14th	15th	16th	17th (2 seats)		18th	19th	20th	21st	22nd (2 seats)		23rd (2 seats)		24th	25th	26th	27th	28th	29th	30th	31st	32nd	33rd	Congress
Abel; Huntington (J)	Isaac B. Van Houten (J)	Churchill C. Cambreleng (J)	Campbell; P. White (J)	Cornelius; Lawrence (J)	Dudley; Selden (J)	Aaron; Ward (J)	Abraham; Bockee (J)	John W. Brown (J)	Charles; Bodle (J)	John; Adams (J)	Aaron; Vanderpoel (J)	Job; Pierson (J)	Gerrit Y. Lansing (J)	John; Cramer (J)	Henry C. Martindale (A-M)	Reuben; Whallon (J)	Ransom H. Gillet (J)	Charles; McVean (J)	Abijah; Mann; Jr. (J)	Samuel; Beardsley (J)	Joel; Turrill (J)	Daniel; Wardwell (J)	Sherman; Page (J)	Noadiah; Johnson (J)	Henry; Mitchell (J)	Nicoll; Halsey (J)	Samuel G. Hathaway (J)	William K. Fuller (J)	William; Taylor (J)	Rowland; Day (J)	Samuel; Clark (J)	John; Dickson (A-M)	Edward; Howell (J)	Frederick; Whittlesey (A-M)	George W. Lay (A-M)	Philo C. Fuller (A-M)	Abner; Hazeltine (A-M)	Millard; Fillmore (A-M)	Gideon; Hard (A-M)	23rd (1833–1835)
Abel; Huntington (J)	Isaac B. Van Houten (J)	Churchill C. Cambreleng (J)	Campbell; P. White (J)	John J. Morgan (J)	Charles G. Ferris (J)	Aaron; Ward (J)	Abraham; Bockee (J)	John W. Brown (J)	Charles; Bodle (J)	John; Adams (J)	Aaron; Vanderpoel (J)	Job; Pierson (J)	Gerrit Y. Lansing (J)	John; Cramer (J)	Henry C. Martindale (A-M)	Reuben; Whallon (J)	Ransom H. Gillet (J)	Charles; McVean (J)	Abijah; Mann; Jr. (J)	Samuel; Beardsley (J)	Joel; Turrill (J)	Daniel; Wardwell (J)	Sherman; Page (J)	Noadiah; Johnson (J)	Henry; Mitchell (J)	Nicoll; Halsey (J)	Samuel G. Hathaway (J)	William K. Fuller (J)	William; Taylor (J)	Rowland; Day (J)	Samuel; Clark (J)	John; Dickson (A-M)	Edward; Howell (J)	Frederick; Whittlesey (A-M)	George W. Lay (A-M)	Philo C. Fuller (A-M)	Abner; Hazeltine (A-M)	Millard; Fillmore (A-M)	Gideon; Hard (A-M)	23rd (1833–1835)
Abel; Huntington (J)	Samuel; Barton (J)	Churchill C. Cambreleng (J)	Campbell; P. White (J)	John; McKeon (J)	Ely; Moore (J)	Aaron; Ward (J)	Abraham; Bockee (J)	John W. Brown (J)	Nicholas; Sickles (J)	Valentine; Efner (J)	Aaron; Vanderpoel (J)	Hiram P. Hunt (NR)	Gerrit Y. Lansing (J)	John; Cramer (J)	David Abel; Russell (NR)	Dudley; Farlin (J)	Ransom H. Gillet (J)	Matthias J. Bovee (J)	Abijah; Mann; Jr. (J)	Samuel; Beardsley (J)	Joel; Turrill (J)	Daniel; Wardwell (J)	Sherman; Page (J)	William; Seymour (J)	William; Mason (J)	Stephen B. Leonard (J)	Joseph; Reynolds (J)	William K. Fuller (J)	William; Taylor (J)	Ulysses F. Doubleday (J)	Graham H. Chapin (J)	Francis; Granger (NR)	Joshua; Lee (J)	Timothy; Childs (NR)	George W. Lay (NR)	Philo C. Fuller (NR)	Abner; Hazeltine (NR)	Thomas; C. Love (NR)	Gideon; Hard (NR)	24th (1835–1837)
Abel; Huntington (J)	Samuel; Barton (J)	Churchill C. Cambreleng (J)	Gideon; Lee (J)	John; McKeon (J)	Ely; Moore (J)	Aaron; Ward (J)	Abraham; Bockee (J)	John W. Brown (J)	Nicholas; Sickles (J)	Valentine; Efner (J)	Aaron; Vanderpoel (J)	Hiram P. Hunt (NR)	Gerrit Y. Lansing (J)	John; Cramer (J)	David Abel; Russell (NR)	Dudley; Farlin (J)	Ransom H. Gillet (J)	Matthias J. Bovee (J)	Abijah; Mann; Jr. (J)	Rutger B. Miller (J)	Joel; Turrill (J)	Daniel; Wardwell (J)	Sherman; Page (J)	William; Seymour (J)	William; Mason (J)	Stephen B. Leonard (J)	Joseph; Reynolds (J)	William K. Fuller (J)	William; Taylor (J)	Ulysses F. Doubleday (J)	Graham H. Chapin (J)	Francis; Granger (NR)	Joshua; Lee (J)	Timothy; Childs (NR)	George W. Lay (NR)	John; Young (NR)	Abner; Hazeltine (NR)	Thomas; C. Love (NR)	Gideon; Hard (NR)	24th (1835–1837)
Thomas B. Jackson (D)	Abraham; Vanderveer (D)	Churchill C. Cambreleng (D)	Edward; Curtis (W)	Josiah; Ogden; Hoffman (W)	Ely; Moore (D)	Gouverneur; Kemble (D)	Obadiah; Titus (D)	Nathaniel; Jones (D)	John C. Brodhead (D)	Zadock; Pratt (D)	Robert; McClellan (D)	Henry; Vail (D)	Albert; Gallup (D)	John I. De Graff (D)	David; Abel; Russell (W)	John; Palmer (D)	James B. Spencer (D)	John; Edwards (D)	Arphaxed; Loomis (D)	Henry A. Foster (D)	Abraham; P. Grant (D)	Isaac H. Bronson (D)	John; Holmes; Prentiss (D)	Amasa J. Parker (D)	John C. Clark (D)	Andrew DeWitt; Bruyn (D)	Hiram; Gray (D)	Bennet; Bicknell (D)	William; Taylor (D)	William H. Noble (D)	Samuel; Birdsall (D)	Mark H. Sibley (W)	John T. Andrews (D)	Timothy; Childs (W)	William; Patterson (W)	Luther C. Peck (W)	Richard; P. Marvin (W)	Millard; Fillmore (W)	Charles F. Mitchell (W)	25th (1837–1839)
Thomas B. Jackson (D)	Abraham; Vanderveer (D)	Churchill C. Cambreleng (D)	Edward; Curtis (W)	Josiah; Ogden; Hoffman (W)	Ely; Moore (D)	Gouverneur; Kemble (D)	Obadiah; Titus (D)	Nathaniel; Jones (D)	John C. Brodhead (D)	Zadock; Pratt (D)	Robert; McClellan (D)	Henry; Vail (D)	Albert; Gallup (D)	John I. De Graff (D)	David; Abel; Russell (W)	John; Palmer (D)	James B. Spencer (D)	John; Edwards (D)	Arphaxed; Loomis (D)	Henry A. Foster (D)	Abraham; P. Grant (D)	Isaac H. Bronson (D)	John; Holmes; Prentiss (D)	Amasa J. Parker (D)	John C. Clark (D)	Cyrus Beers (D)	Hiram; Gray (D)	Bennet; Bicknell (D)	William; Taylor (D)	William H. Noble (D)	Samuel; Birdsall (D)	Mark H. Sibley (W)	John T. Andrews (D)	Timothy; Childs (W)	Harvey Putnam (W)	Luther C. Peck (W)	Richard; P. Marvin (W)	Millard; Fillmore (W)	Charles F. Mitchell (W)	25th (1837–1839)
Thomas B. Jackson (D)	James De La; Montanya (D)	Moses H. Grinnell (W)	Edward; Curtis (W)	Josiah; Ogden; Hoffman (W)	James; Monroe (W)	Gouverneur; Kemble (D)	Charles; Johnston (W)	Nathaniel; Jones (D)	Rufus; Palen (W)	John; Ely (D)	Aaron; Vanderpoel (D)	Hiram P. Hunt (W)	Daniel D. Barnard (W)	Anson Brown (W)	David; Abel; Russell (W)	Augustus; C. Hand (D)	John; Fine (D)	Peter Joseph; Wagner (W)	Andrew; W. Doig (D)	David P. Brewster (D)	John G. Floyd (D)	Thomas C. Chittenden (W)	John; Holmes; Prentiss (D)	Judson; Allen (D)	John C. Clark (W)	Amasa; Dana (D)	Stephen B. Leonard (D)	Nehemiah; H. Earll (D)	Edward; Rogers (D)	Christopher; Morgan (W)	Theron R. Strong (D)	Francis; Granger (W)	Meredith; Mallory (D)	Thomas; Kempshall (W)	Seth M. Gates (W)	Luther C. Peck (W)	Richard; P. Marvin (W)	Millard; Fillmore (W)	Charles F. Mitchell (W)	26th (1839–1841)
Thomas B. Jackson (D)	James De La; Montanya (D)	Moses H. Grinnell (W)	Edward; Curtis (W)	Josiah; Ogden; Hoffman (W)	James; Monroe (W)	Gouverneur; Kemble (D)	Charles; Johnston (W)	Nathaniel; Jones (D)	Rufus; Palen (W)	John; Ely (D)	Aaron; Vanderpoel (D)	Hiram P. Hunt (W)	Daniel D. Barnard (W)	Nicholas B. Doe (W)	David; Abel; Russell (W)	Augustus; C. Hand (D)	John; Fine (D)	Peter Joseph; Wagner (W)	Andrew; W. Doig (D)	David P. Brewster (D)	John G. Floyd (D)	Thomas C. Chittenden (W)	John; Holmes; Prentiss (D)	Judson; Allen (D)	John C. Clark (W)	Amasa; Dana (D)	Stephen B. Leonard (D)	Nehemiah; H. Earll (D)	Edward; Rogers (D)	Christopher; Morgan (W)	Theron R. Strong (D)	Francis; Granger (W)	Meredith; Mallory (D)	Thomas; Kempshall (W)	Seth M. Gates (W)	Luther C. Peck (W)	Richard; P. Marvin (W)	Millard; Fillmore (W)	Charles F. Mitchell (W)	26th (1839–1841)
Charles A. Floyd (D)	Joseph; Egbert (D)	Charles G. Ferris (D)	Fernando; Wood (D)	John; McKeon (D)	James I. Roosevelt (D)	Aaron; Ward (D)	Richard; D. Davis (D)	James G. Clinton (D)	John; Van Buren (D)	Jacob; Houck; Jr. (D)	Robert; McClellan (D)	Hiram P. Hunt (W)	Daniel D. Barnard (W)	Archibald L. Linn (W)	Bernard; Blair (W)	Thomas A. Tomlinson (W)	Henry; Bell Van; Rensselaer (W)	John; Sanford (D)	Andrew; W. Doig (D)	David P. Brewster (D)	John G. Floyd (D)	Thomas C. Chittenden (W)	Samuel; S. Bowne (D)	Samuel; Gordon (D)	John C. Clark (W)	Samuel; Partridge (D)	Lewis; Riggs (D)	Victory; Birdseye (W)	A. Lawrence; Foster (W)	Christopher; Morgan (W)	John; Maynard (W)	Francis; Granger (W)	William; M. Oliver (D)	Timothy; Childs (W)	Seth M. Gates (W)	John Young (W)	Staley N. Clarke (W)	Millard; Fillmore (W)	Alfred; Babcock (W)	27th (1841–1843)
Charles A. Floyd (D)	Joseph; Egbert (D)	Charles G. Ferris (D)	Fernando; Wood (D)	John; McKeon (D)	James I. Roosevelt (D)	Aaron; Ward (D)	Richard; D. Davis (D)	James G. Clinton (D)	John; Van Buren (D)	Jacob; Houck; Jr. (D)	Robert; McClellan (D)	Hiram P. Hunt (W)	Daniel D. Barnard (W)	Archibald L. Linn (W)	Bernard; Blair (W)	Thomas A. Tomlinson (W)	Henry; Bell Van; Rensselaer (W)	John; Sanford (D)	Andrew; W. Doig (D)	David P. Brewster (D)	John G. Floyd (D)	Thomas C. Chittenden (W)	Samuel; S. Bowne (D)	Samuel; Gordon (D)	John C. Clark (W)	Samuel; Partridge (D)	Lewis; Riggs (D)	Victory; Birdseye (W)	A. Lawrence; Foster (W)	Christopher; Morgan (W)	John; Maynard (W)	John Greig (W)	William; M. Oliver (D)	Timothy; Childs (W)	Seth M. Gates (W)	John Young (W)	Staley N. Clarke (W)	Millard; Fillmore (W)	Alfred; Babcock (W)	27th (1841–1843)
Charles A. Floyd (D)	Joseph; Egbert (D)	Charles G. Ferris (D)	Fernando; Wood (D)	John; McKeon (D)	James I. Roosevelt (D)	Aaron; Ward (D)	Richard; D. Davis (D)	James G. Clinton (D)	John; Van Buren (D)	Jacob; Houck; Jr. (D)	Robert; McClellan (D)	Hiram P. Hunt (W)	Daniel D. Barnard (W)	Archibald L. Linn (W)	Bernard; Blair (W)	Thomas A. Tomlinson (W)	Henry; Bell Van; Rensselaer (W)	John; Sanford (D)	Andrew; W. Doig (D)	David P. Brewster (D)	John G. Floyd (D)	Thomas C. Chittenden (W)	Samuel; S. Bowne (D)	Samuel; Gordon (D)	John C. Clark (W)	Samuel; Partridge (D)	Lewis; Riggs (D)	Victory; Birdseye (W)	A. Lawrence; Foster (W)	Christopher; Morgan (W)	John; Maynard (W)	Francis; Granger (W)	William; M. Oliver (D)	Timothy; Childs (W)	Seth M. Gates (W)	John Young (W)	Staley N. Clarke (W)	Millard; Fillmore (W)	Alfred; Babcock (W)	27th (1841–1843)

=== 1843–1853: 34 seats ===
Congress
28th
(1843–1845)
29th
(1845–1847)
30th
(1847–1849)
31st
(1849–1851)
32nd
(1851–1853)

District										District										District										District				Congress
1st	2nd	3rd	4th	5th	6th	7th	8th	9th	10th	11th	12th	13th	14th	15th	16th	17th	18th	19th	20th	21st	22nd	23rd	24th	25th	26th	27th	28th	29th	30th	31st	32nd	33rd	34th	Congress
Selah B. Strong (D)	Henry C. Murphy (D)	Jonas P. Phoenix (W)	William B. Maclay (D)	Moses G. Leonard (D)	Hamilton; Fish (W)	Joseph H. Anderson (D)	Richard D. Davis (D)	James G. Clinton (D)	Jeremiah; Russell (D)	Zadock; Pratt (D)	David L. Seymour (D)	Daniel D. Barnard (W)	Charles; Rogers (W)	Lemuel; Stetson (D)	Chesselden; Ellis (D)	Charles S. Benton (D)	Preston; King (D)	Orville; Hungerford (D)	Samuel; Beardsley (D)	Jeremiah E. Cary (D)	Meade; Purdy (D)	Orville; Robinson (D)	Horace; Wheaton (D)	George O. Rathbun (D)	Amasa; Dana (D)	Byram; Green (D)	Thomas J. Paterson (W)	Charles H. Carroll (W)	William; Spring; Hubbell (D)	Asher; Tyler (W)	William A. Moseley (W)	Albert; Smith (W)	Washington; Hunt (W)	28th (1843–1845)
Selah B. Strong (D)	Henry C. Murphy (D)	Jonas P. Phoenix (W)	William B. Maclay (D)	Moses G. Leonard (D)	Hamilton; Fish (W)	Joseph H. Anderson (D)	Richard D. Davis (D)	James G. Clinton (D)	Jeremiah; Russell (D)	Zadock; Pratt (D)	David L. Seymour (D)	Daniel D. Barnard (W)	Charles; Rogers (W)	Lemuel; Stetson (D)	Chesselden; Ellis (D)	Charles S. Benton (D)	Preston; King (D)	Orville; Hungerford (D)	Levi D. Carpenter (D)	Jeremiah E. Cary (D)	Meade; Purdy (D)	Orville; Robinson (D)	Horace; Wheaton (D)	George O. Rathbun (D)	Amasa; Dana (D)	Byram; Green (D)	Thomas J. Paterson (W)	Charles H. Carroll (W)	William; Spring; Hubbell (D)	Asher; Tyler (W)	William A. Moseley (W)	Albert; Smith (W)	Washington; Hunt (W)	28th (1843–1845)
John W. Lawrence (D)	Henry J. Seaman (KN)	William S. Miller (KN)	William B. Maclay (D)	Thomas; M. Woodruff (KN)	William W. Campbell (KN)	Joseph H. Anderson (D)	William W. Woodworth (D)	Archibald C. Niven (D)	Samuel; Gordon (D)	John F. Collin (D)	Richard P. Herrick (W)	Bradford R. Wood (D)	Erastus D. Culver (W)	Joseph; Russell (D)	Hugh; White (W)	Charles S. Benton (D)	Preston; King (D)	Orville; Hungerford (D)	Timothy; Jenkins (D)	Charles; Goodyear (D)	Stephen; Strong (D)	William J. Hough (D)	Horace; Wheaton (D)	George O. Rathbun (D)	Samuel S. Ellsworth (D)	John; De Mott (D)	Elias B. Holmes (W)	Charles H. Carroll (W)	Martin; Grover (D)	Abner; Lewis (W)	William A. Moseley (W)	Albert; Smith (W)	Washington; Hunt (W)	29th (1845–1847)
John W. Lawrence (D)	Henry J. Seaman (KN)	William S. Miller (KN)	William B. Maclay (D)	Thomas; M. Woodruff (KN)	William W. Campbell (KN)	Joseph H. Anderson (D)	William W. Woodworth (D)	Archibald C. Niven (D)	Samuel; Gordon (D)	John F. Collin (D)	Thomas C. Ripley (W)	Bradford R. Wood (D)	Erastus D. Culver (W)	Joseph; Russell (D)	Hugh; White (W)	Charles S. Benton (D)	Preston; King (D)	Orville; Hungerford (D)	Timothy; Jenkins (D)	Charles; Goodyear (D)	Stephen; Strong (D)	William J. Hough (D)	Horace; Wheaton (D)	George O. Rathbun (D)	Samuel S. Ellsworth (D)	John; De Mott (D)	Elias B. Holmes (W)	Charles H. Carroll (W)	Martin; Grover (D)	Abner; Lewis (W)	William A. Moseley (W)	Albert; Smith (W)	Washington; Hunt (W)	29th (1845–1847)
Frederick; William; Lord (D)	Henry C. Murphy (D)	Henry; Nicoll (D)	William B. Maclay (D)	Frederick; A. Tallmadge (W)	David S. Jackson (D)	William; Nelson (W)	Cornelius; Warren (W)	Daniel B. St. John (W)	Eliakim; Sherrill (W)	Peter H. Silvester (W)	Gideon; Reynolds (W)	John I. Slingerland (W)	Orlando; Kellogg (W)	Sidney; Lawrence (D)	Hugh; White (W)	George; Petrie (ID)	William; Collins (D)	Joseph; Mullin (W)	Timothy; Jenkins (D)	George; Anson; Starkweather (D)	Ausburn; Birdsall (D)	William; Duer (W)	Daniel; Gott (W)	Harmon S. Conger (W)	William T. Lawrence (W)	John M. Holley (W)	Elias B. Holmes (W)	Robert L. Rose (W)	David; Rumsey (W)	Dudley; Marvin (W)	Nathan K. Hall (W)	Harvey; Putnam (W)	Washington; Hunt (W)	30th (1847–1849)
Frederick; William; Lord (D)	Henry C. Murphy (D)	Henry; Nicoll (D)	William B. Maclay (D)	Frederick; A. Tallmadge (W)	Horace; Greeley (W)	William; Nelson (W)	Cornelius; Warren (W)	Daniel B. St. John (W)	Eliakim; Sherrill (W)	Peter H. Silvester (W)	Gideon; Reynolds (W)	John I. Slingerland (W)	Orlando; Kellogg (W)	Sidney; Lawrence (D)	Hugh; White (W)	George; Petrie (ID)	William; Collins (D)	Joseph; Mullin (W)	Timothy; Jenkins (D)	George; Anson; Starkweather (D)	Ausburn; Birdsall (D)	William; Duer (W)	Daniel; Gott (W)	Harmon S. Conger (W)	William T. Lawrence (W)	Esbon; Blackmar (W)	Elias B. Holmes (W)	Robert L. Rose (W)	David; Rumsey (W)	Dudley; Marvin (W)	Nathan K. Hall (W)	Harvey; Putnam (W)	Washington; Hunt (W)	30th (1847–1849)
John A. King (W)	David A. Bokee (W)	Jonas P. Phoenix (W)	Walter; Underhill (W)	George; Briggs (W)	James; Brooks (W)	William; Nelson (W)	Ransom; Halloway (W)	Thomas; McKissock (W)	Herman D. Gould (W)	Peter H. Silvester (W)	Gideon; Reynolds (W)	John L. Schoolcraft (W)	George Rex; Andrews (W)	John R. Thurman (W)	Hugh; White (W)	Henry P. Alexander (W)	Preston; King (FS)	Charles E. Clarke (W)	Orsamus B. Matteson (W)	Hiram; Walden (D)	Henry; Bennett (W)	William; Duer (W)	Daniel; Gott (W)	Harmon S. Conger (W)	William Terry; Jackson (W)	William A. Sackett (W)	Abraham M. Schermerhorn (W)	Robert L. Rose (W)	David; Rumsey (W)	Elijah; Risley (W)	Elbridge G. Spaulding (W)	Harvey; Putnam (W)	Lorenzo; Burrows (W)	31st (1849–1851)
John G. Floyd (D)	Obadiah; Bowne (W)	Emanuel B. Hart (D)	John H. H. Haws (W)	George; Briggs (W)	James; Brooks (W)	Abraham P. Stephens (D)	Gilbert; Dean (D)	William; Murray (D)	Marius; Schoonmaker (W)	Josiah; Sutherland (D)	David L. Seymour (D)	John L. Schoolcraft (W)	John H. Boyd (W)	Joseph; Russell (D)	John; Wells (W)	Alexander H. Buell (D)	Preston; King (FS)	Willard; Ives (D)	Timothy; Jenkins (D)	William W. Snow (D)	Henry; Bennett (W)	Leander; Babcock (D)	Daniel T. Jones (D)	Thomas Y. Howe Jr. (D)	Henry S. Walbridge (W)	William A. Sackett (W)	Abraham M. Schermerhorn (W)	Jerediah; Horsford (W)	Reuben; Robie (D)	Frederick S. Martin (W)	Solomon G. Haven (W)	Augustus P. Hascall (W)	Lorenzo; Burrows (W)	32nd (1851–1853)

=== 1853–1863: 33 seats ===
Congress
33rd
(1853–1855)
34th
(1855–1857)
35th
(1857–1859)
36th
(1859–1861)
37th
(1861–1863)

District										District										District										District			Congress
1st	2nd	3rd	4th	5th	6th	7th	8th	9th	10th	11th	12th	13th	14th	15th	16th	17th	18th	19th	20th	21st	22nd	23rd	24th	25th	26th	27th	28th	29th	30th	31st	32nd	33rd	Congress
James; Maurice (D)	Thomas W. Cumming (D)	Hiram; Walbridge (D)	Michael; Walsh (D)	William M. Tweed (D)	John; Wheeler (D)	William; Adams; Walker (D)	Francis B. Cutting (D)	Jared V. Peck (D)	William; Murray (D)	Theodoric R. Westbrook (D)	Gilbert Dean (D)	Russell; Sage (W)	Rufus; Wheeler; Peckham (D)	Charles; Hughes (D)	George A. Simmons (W)	Bishop; Perkins (D)	Peter; Rowe (D)	George W. Chase (W)	Orsamus B. Matteson (W)	Henry; Bennett (W)	Gerrit Smith (FS)	Caleb; Lyon (I)	Daniel T. Jones (D)	Edwin B. Morgan (W)	Andrew; Oliver (D)	John J. Taylor (D)	George; Hastings (D)	Azariah Boody (W)	Benjamin; Pringle (W)	Thomas T. Flagler (W)	Solomon G. Haven (W)	Reuben; Fenton (D)	33rd (1853–1855)
James; Maurice (D)	Thomas W. Cumming (D)	Hiram; Walbridge (D)	Michael; Walsh (D)	William M. Tweed (D)	John; Wheeler (D)	William; Adams; Walker (D)	Francis B. Cutting (D)	Jared V. Peck (D)	William; Murray (D)	Theodoric R. Westbrook (D)	Isaac Teller (W)	Russell; Sage (W)	Rufus; Wheeler; Peckham (D)	Charles; Hughes (D)	George A. Simmons (W)	Bishop; Perkins (D)	Peter; Rowe (D)	George W. Chase (W)	Orsamus B. Matteson (W)	Henry; Bennett (W)	Henry C. Goodwin (W)	Caleb; Lyon (I)	Daniel T. Jones (D)	Edwin B. Morgan (W)	Andrew; Oliver (D)	John J. Taylor (D)	George; Hastings (D)	Davis; Carpenter (W)	Benjamin; Pringle (W)	Thomas T. Flagler (W)	Solomon G. Haven (W)	Reuben; Fenton (D)	33rd (1853–1855)
William; Valk (KN)	James S. T. Stranahan (W)	Guy R. Pelton (W)	John; Kelly (D)	Thomas R. Whitney (KN)	John; Wheeler (D)	Thomas; Child Jr. (W)	Abram; Wakeman (W)	Bayard; Clarke (KN)	Ambrose S. Murray (W)	Rufus H. King (W)	Killian; Miller (W)	Russell; Sage (W)	Samuel; Dickson (W)	Edward; Dodd (W)	George A. Simmons (W)	Francis E. Spinner (D)	Thomas R. Horton (W)	Jonas A. Hughston (W)	Orsamus B. Matteson (W)	Henry; Bennett (W)	Andrew Z. McCarty (W)	William A. Gilbert (W)	Amos P. Granger (W)	Edwin B. Morgan (W)	Andrew; Oliver (D)	John M. Parker (W)	William H. Kelsey (W)	John; Williams (D)	Benjamin; Pringle (W)	Thomas T. Flagler (W)	Solomon G. Haven (W)	Francis S. Edwards (KN)	34th (1855–1857)
John A. Searing (D)	George; Taylor (D)	Daniel; Sickles (D)	John; Kelly (D)	William B. Maclay (D)	John; Cochrane (D)	Elijah; Ward (D)	Horace F. Clark (D) (Note: Anti-Lecompton Democrat.)	John B. Haskin (D)	Ambrose S. Murray (R)	William Fiero; Russell (D)	John; Thompson (R)	Abram B. Olin (R)	Erastus; Corning (D)	Edward; Dodd (R)	George; William; Palmer (R)	Francis E. Spinner (R)	Clark B. Cochrane (R)	Oliver A. Morse (R)	Orsamus B. Matteson (R)	Henry; Bennett (R)	Henry C. Goodwin (R)	Charles B. Hoard (R)	Amos P. Granger (R)	Edwin B. Morgan (R)	Emory B. Pottle (R)	John M. Parker (R)	William H. Kelsey (R)	Samuel G. Andrews (R)	Judson W. Sherman (R)	Silas M. Burroughs (R)	Israel T. Hatch (D)	Reuben; Fenton (R)	34th (1855–1857)
John A. Searing (D)	George; Taylor (D)	Daniel; Sickles (D)	Thomas J. Barr (ID)	William B. Maclay (D)	John; Cochrane (D)	Elijah; Ward (D)	Horace F. Clark (D)	John B. Haskin (D)	Ambrose S. Murray (R)	William Fiero; Russell (D)	John; Thompson (R)	Abram B. Olin (R)	Erastus; Corning (D)	Edward; Dodd (R)	George; William; Palmer (R)	Francis E. Spinner (R)	Clark B. Cochrane (R)	Oliver A. Morse (R)	Orsamus B. Matteson (R)	Henry; Bennett (R)	Henry C. Goodwin (R)	Charles B. Hoard (R)	Amos P. Granger (R)	Edwin B. Morgan (R)	Emory B. Pottle (R)	John M. Parker (R)	William H. Kelsey (R)	Samuel G. Andrews (R)	Judson W. Sherman (R)	Silas M. Burroughs (R)	Israel T. Hatch (D)	Reuben; Fenton (R)	34th (1855–1857)
Luther C. Carter (R)	James; Humphrey (R)	Daniel; Sickles (D)	Thomas J. Barr (ID)	William B. Maclay (D)	John; Cochrane (D)	George; Briggs (R)	Horace F. Clark (D)	John B. Haskin (D)	Charles Van; Wyck (R)	William S. Kenyon (R)	Charles Lewis; Beale (R)	Abram B. Olin (R)	John H. Reynolds (D)	James B. McKean (R)	George; William; Palmer (R)	Francis E. Spinner (R)	Clark B. Cochrane (R)	James H. Graham (R)	Roscoe; Conkling (R)	R. Holland; Duell (R)	M. Lindley; Lee (R)	Charles B. Hoard (R)	Charles B. Sedgwick (R)	Martin; Butterfield (R)	Emory B. Pottle (R)	Alfred; Wells (R)	William; Irvine (R)	Alfred; Ely (R)	Augustus; Frank (R)	Silas M. Burroughs (R)	Elbridge G. Spaulding (R)	Reuben; Fenton (R)	36th (1859–1861)
Edward H. Smith (D)	Moses F. Odell (D)	Benjamin; Wood (D)	James; Kerrigan (ID)	William; Wall (R)	Frederick A. Conkling (R)	Elijah; Ward (D)	Isaac C. Delaplaine (D)	Edward; Haight (D)	Charles Van; Wyck (R)	John B. Steele (D)	Stephen; Baker (R)	Abram B. Olin (R)	Erastus; Corning (D)	James B. McKean (R)	William A. Wheeler (R)	Socrates N. Sherman (R)	Chauncey; Vibbard (D)	Richard; Franchot (R)	Roscoe; Conkling (R)	R. Holland; Duell (R)	William E. Lansing (R)	Ambrose; W. Clark (R)	Charles B. Sedgwick (R)	Theodore M. Pomeroy (R)	Jacob P. Chamberlain (R)	Alexander S. Diven (R)	Robert B. Van; Valkenburgh (R)	Alfred; Ely (R)	Augustus; Frank (R)	Burt Van; Horn (R)	Elbridge G. Spaulding (R)	Reuben; Fenton (R)	37th (1861–1863)

=== 1863–1873: 31 seats ===
Congress
38th
(1863–1865)
39th
(1865–1867)
40th
(1867–1869)
41st
(1869–1871)
42nd
(1871–1873)

District										District										District											Congress
1st	2nd	3rd	4th	5th	6th	7th	8th	9th	10th	11th	12th	13th	14th	15th	16th	17th	18th	19th	20th	21st	22nd	23rd	24th	25th	26th	27th	28th	29th	30th	31st	Congress
Henry G. Stebbins (D)	Martin; Kalbfleisch (D)	Moses F. Odell (D)	Benjamin; Wood (D)	Fernando; Wood (D)	Elijah; Ward (D)	John; Winthrop; Chanler (D)	James; Brooks (D)	Anson; Herrick (D)	William; Radford (D)	Charles H. Winfield (D)	Homer; Augustus; Nelson (D)	John B. Steele (D)	John V. L. Pruyn (D)	John; Augustus; Griswold (D)	Orlando; Kellogg (R)	Calvin T. Hulburd (R)	James M. Marvin (R)	Samuel F. Miller (R)	Ambrose; W. Clark (R)	Francis; Kernan (D)	DeWitt; Clinton; Littlejohn (R)	Thomas; Treadwell; Davis (U)	Theodore; M. Pomeroy (R)	Daniel; Morris (R)	Giles W. Hotchkiss (R)	Robert B. Van; Valkenburgh (R)	Freeman; Clarke (R)	Augustus; Frank (R)	John; Ganson (D)	Reuben; Fenton (R)	38th (1863–1865)
Dwight; Townsend (D)	Martin; Kalbfleisch (D)	Moses F. Odell (D)	Benjamin; Wood (D)	Fernando; Wood (D)	Elijah; Ward (D)	John; Winthrop; Chanler (D)	James; Brooks (D)	Anson; Herrick (D)	William; Radford (D)	Charles H. Winfield (D)	Homer; Augustus; Nelson (D)	John B. Steele (D)	John V. L. Pruyn (D)	John; Augustus; Griswold (D)	Orlando; Kellogg (R)	Calvin T. Hulburd (R)	James M. Marvin (R)	Samuel F. Miller (R)	Ambrose; W. Clark (R)	Francis; Kernan (D)	DeWitt; Clinton; Littlejohn (R)	Thomas; Treadwell; Davis (U)	Theodore; M. Pomeroy (R)	Daniel; Morris (R)	Giles W. Hotchkiss (R)	Robert B. Van; Valkenburgh (R)	Freeman; Clarke (R)	Augustus; Frank (R)	John; Ganson (D)	Reuben; Fenton (R)	38th (1863–1865)
Stephen; Taber (D)	Teunis G. Bergen (D)	James; Humphrey (R)	Morgan; Jones (D)	Nelson; Taylor (D)	Henry; Jarvis; Raymond (R)	John; Winthrop; Chanler (D)	James; Brooks (D)	William; Augustus; Darling (R)	William; Radford (D)	Charles H. Winfield (D)	John H. Ketcham (R)	Edwin N. Hubbell (D)	Charles; Goodyear (D)	John; Augustus; Griswold (R)	Orlando; Kellogg (R)	Calvin T. Hulburd (R)	James M. Marvin (R)	Demas; Hubbard; Jr. (R)	Addison H. Laflin (R)	Roscoe; Conkling (R)	Sidney T. Holmes (R)	Thomas; Treadwell; Davis (R)	Theodore; M. Pomeroy (R)	Daniel; Morris (R)	Giles W. Hotchkiss (R)	Hamilton; Ward Sr. (R)	Roswell; Hart (R)	Burt Van; Horn (R)	James M. Humphrey (D)	Henry Van; Aernam (R)	39th (1865–1867)
Stephen; Taber (D)	Teunis G. Bergen (D)	John W. Hunter (D)	Morgan; Jones (D)	Nelson; Taylor (D)	Henry; Jarvis; Raymond (R)	John; Winthrop; Chanler (D)	William E. Dodge (R)	William; Augustus; Darling (R)	William; Radford (D)	Charles H. Winfield (D)	John H. Ketcham (R)	Edwin N. Hubbell (D)	Charles; Goodyear (D)	John; Augustus; Griswold (R)	Robert S. Hale (R)	Calvin T. Hulburd (R)	James M. Marvin (R)	Demas; Hubbard; Jr. (R)	Addison H. Laflin (R)	Roscoe; Conkling (R)	Sidney T. Holmes (R)	Thomas; Treadwell; Davis (R)	Theodore; M. Pomeroy (R)	Daniel; Morris (R)	Giles W. Hotchkiss (R)	Hamilton; Ward Sr. (R)	Roswell; Hart (R)	Burt Van; Horn (R)	James M. Humphrey (D)	Henry Van; Aernam (R)	39th (1865–1867)
Stephen; Taber (D)	Demas; Barnes (D)	William Erigena; Robinson (D)	John; Fox (D)	John; Morrissey (D)	Thomas E. Stewart (CR)	John; Winthrop; Chanler (D)	James; Brooks (D)	Fernando; Wood (D)	William H. Robertson (R)	Charles Van; Wyck (R)	John H. Ketcham (R)	Thomas; Cornell (R)	John V. L. Pruyn (D)	John; Augustus; Griswold (R)	Orange; Ferriss (R)	Calvin T. Hulburd (R)	James M. Marvin (R)	William C. Fields (R)	Addison H. Laflin (R)	Alexander; H. Bailey (R)	John C. Churchill (R)	Dennis; McCarthy (R)	Theodore; M. Pomeroy (R)	William H. Kelsey (R)	William S. Lincoln (R)	Hamilton; Ward Sr. (R)	Lewis; Selye (IR)	Burt Van; Horn (R)	James M. Humphrey (D)	Henry Van; Aernam (R)	40th (1867–1869)
Henry; Augustus; Reeves (D)	John G. Schumaker (D)	Henry; Warner; Slocum (D)	John; Fox (D)	John; Morrissey (D)	Samuel S. Cox (D)	Hervey C. Calkin (D)	James; Brooks (D)	Fernando; Wood (D)	Clarkson; Nott; Potter (D)	George W. Greene (D)	John H. Ketcham (R)	John; Ashley; Griswold (D)	Stephen; L. Mayham (D)	Adolphus; H. Tanner (R)	Orange; Ferriss (R)	William; A. Wheeler (R)	Stephen; Sanford (R)	Charles; Knapp (R)	Addison H. Laflin (R)	Alexander; H. Bailey (R)	John C. Churchill (R)	Dennis; McCarthy (R)	George W. Cowles (R)	William H. Kelsey (R)	Giles W. Hotchkiss (R)	Hamilton; Ward Sr. (R)	Noah; Davis (R)	John; Fisher (R)	David S. Bennett (R)	Porter; Sheldon (R)	41st (1869–1871)
Henry; Augustus; Reeves (D)	John G. Schumaker (D)	Henry; Warner; Slocum (D)	John; Fox (D)	John; Morrissey (D)	Samuel S. Cox (D)	Hervey C. Calkin (D)	James; Brooks (D)	Fernando; Wood (D)	Clarkson; Nott; Potter (D)	Charles Van; Wyck (R)	John H. Ketcham (R)	John; Ashley; Griswold (D)	Stephen; L. Mayham (D)	Adolphus; H. Tanner (R)	Orange; Ferriss (R)	William; A. Wheeler (R)	Stephen; Sanford (R)	Charles; Knapp (R)	Addison H. Laflin (R)	Alexander; H. Bailey (R)	John C. Churchill (R)	Dennis; McCarthy (R)	George W. Cowles (R)	William H. Kelsey (R)	Giles W. Hotchkiss (R)	Hamilton; Ward Sr. (R)	Charles H. Holmes (R)	John; Fisher (R)	David S. Bennett (R)	Porter; Sheldon (R)	41st (1869–1871)
Dwight; Townsend (D)	Thomas; Kinsella (D)	Henry; Warner; Slocum (D)	Robert; Roosevelt (D)	William R. Roberts (D)	Samuel S. Cox (D)	Smith; Ely Jr. (D)	James; Brooks (D)	Fernando; Wood (D)	Clarkson; Nott; Potter (D)	Charles; St. John (R)	John H. Ketcham (R)	Joseph H. Tuthill (D)	Eli; Perry (D)	Joseph M. Warren (D)	John; Rogers (D)	William; A. Wheeler (R)	John M. Carroll (D)	Elizur H. Prindle (R)	Clinton L. Merriam (R)	Ellis H. Roberts (R)	William E. Lansing (R)	R. Holland; Duell (R)	John E. Seeley (R)	William H. Lamport (R)	Milo; Goodrich (R)	Horace B. Smith (R)	Freeman; Clarke (R)	Seth; Wakeman (R)	William; Williams (D)	Walter L. Sessions (R)	42nd (1871–1873)

=== 1873–1883: 33 seats ===
Congress
43rd
(1873–1875)
44th
(1875–1877)
45th
(1877–1879)
46th
(1879–1881)
47th
(1881–1883)

District										District										District										District			Congress
1st	2nd	3rd	4th	5th	6th	7th	8th	9th	10th	11th	12th	13th	14th	15th	16th	17th	18th	19th	20th	21st	22nd	23rd	24th	25th	26th	27th	28th	29th	30th	31st	32nd	At-large	Congress
Henry Joel; Scudder (R)	John G. Schumaker (D)	Stewart L. Woodford (R)	Philip S. Crooke (R)	William R. Roberts (D)	James; Brooks (D)	Thomas J. Creamer (D)	John D. Lawson (R)	David B. Mellish (R)	Fernando; Wood (D)	Clarkson; Nott; Potter (D)	Charles; St. John (R)	John O. Whitehouse (D)	David M. De Witt (D)	Eli; Perry (D)	James S. Smart (R)	Robert S. Hale (R)	William A. Wheeler (R)	Henry H. Hathorn (R)	David; Wilber (R)	Clinton L. Merriam (R)	Ellis H. Roberts (R)	William E. Lansing (R)	R. Holland; Duell (R)	Clinton D. MacDougall (R)	William H. Lamport (R)	Thomas C. Platt (R)	Horace B. Smith (R)	Freeman; Clarke (R)	George; Gilbert; Hoskins (R)	Lyman K. Bass (R)	Walter L. Sessions (R)	Lyman; Tremain (R)	43rd (1873–1875)
Henry Joel; Scudder (R)	John G. Schumaker (D)	Simeon B. Chittenden (IR)	Philip S. Crooke (R)	William R. Roberts (D)	Samuel S. Cox (D)	Thomas J. Creamer (D)	John D. Lawson (R)	Richard; Schell (D)	Fernando; Wood (D)	Clarkson; Nott; Potter (D)	Charles; St. John (R)	John O. Whitehouse (D)	David M. De Witt (D)	Eli; Perry (D)	James S. Smart (R)	Robert S. Hale (R)	William A. Wheeler (R)	Henry H. Hathorn (R)	David; Wilber (R)	Clinton L. Merriam (R)	Ellis H. Roberts (R)	William E. Lansing (R)	R. Holland; Duell (R)	Clinton D. MacDougall (R)	William H. Lamport (R)	Thomas C. Platt (R)	Horace B. Smith (R)	Freeman; Clarke (R)	George; Gilbert; Hoskins (R)	Lyman K. Bass (R)	Walter L. Sessions (R)	Lyman; Tremain (R)	43rd (1873–1875)
Henry B. Metcalfe (D)	John G. Schumaker (D)	Simeon B. Chittenden (IR)	Archibald; M. Bliss (D)	Edwin R. Meade (D)	Samuel S. Cox (D)	Smith; Ely Jr. (D)	Elijah; Ward (D)	Fernando; Wood (D)	Abram; Hewitt (D)	Benjamin; A. Willis (D)	Nathaniel; H. Odell (D)	John O. Whitehouse (D)	George M. Beebe (D)	John H. Bagley Jr. (D)	Charles H. Adams (R)	Martin I. Townsend (R)	Andrew; Williams (R)	William A. Wheeler (R)	Henry H. Hathorn (R)	Samuel F. Miller (R)	George A. Bagley (R)	Scott; Lord (D)	William H. Baker (R)	Elias W. Leavenworth (R)	Clinton D. MacDougall (R)	Elbridge G. Lapham (R)	Thomas C. Platt (R)	Charles C. B. Walker (D)	John M. Davy (R)	George; Gilbert; Hoskins (R)	Lyman K. Bass (R)	33rd	44th (1875–1877)
Henry B. Metcalfe (D)	John G. Schumaker (D)	Simeon B. Chittenden (IR)	Archibald; M. Bliss (D)	Edwin R. Meade (D)	Samuel S. Cox (D)	Smith; Ely Jr. (D)	Elijah; Ward (D)	Fernando; Wood (D)	Abram; Hewitt (D)	Benjamin; A. Willis (D)	Nathaniel; H. Odell (D)	John O. Whitehouse (D)	George M. Beebe (D)	John H. Bagley Jr. (D)	Charles H. Adams (R)	Martin I. Townsend (R)	Andrew; Williams (R)	William A. Wheeler (R)	Henry H. Hathorn (R)	Samuel F. Miller (R)	George A. Bagley (R)	Scott; Lord (D)	William H. Baker (R)	Elias W. Leavenworth (R)	Clinton D. MacDougall (R)	Elbridge G. Lapham (R)	Thomas C. Platt (R)	Charles C. B. Walker (D)	John M. Davy (R)	George; Gilbert; Hoskins (R)	Lyman K. Bass (R)	Nelson I. Norton (R)	44th (1875–1877)
Henry B. Metcalfe (D)	John G. Schumaker (D)	Simeon B. Chittenden (IR)	Archibald; M. Bliss (D)	Edwin R. Meade (D)	Samuel S. Cox (D)	David Dudley; Field II (D)	Elijah; Ward (D)	Fernando; Wood (D)	Abram; Hewitt (D)	Benjamin; A. Willis (D)	Nathaniel; H. Odell (D)	John O. Whitehouse (D)	George M. Beebe (D)	John H. Bagley Jr. (D)	Charles H. Adams (R)	Martin I. Townsend (R)	Andrew; Williams (R)	William A. Wheeler (R)	Henry H. Hathorn (R)	Samuel F. Miller (R)	George A. Bagley (R)	Scott; Lord (D)	William H. Baker (R)	Elias W. Leavenworth (R)	Clinton D. MacDougall (R)	Elbridge G. Lapham (R)	Thomas C. Platt (R)	Charles C. B. Walker (D)	John M. Davy (R)	George; Gilbert; Hoskins (R)	Lyman K. Bass (R)	Nelson I. Norton (R)	44th (1875–1877)
James W. Covert (D)	William D. Veeder (D)	Simeon B. Chittenden (R)	Archibald; M. Bliss (D)	Nicholas; Muller (D)	Samuel S. Cox (D)	Anthony; Eickhoff (D)	Anson G. McCook (R)	Fernando; Wood (D)	Abram; Hewitt (D)	Benjamin; A. Willis (D)	Clarkson N. Potter (D)	John H. Ketcham (R)	George M. Beebe (D)	Stephen L. Mayham (D)	Terence J. Quinn (D)	Martin I. Townsend (R)	Andrew; Williams (R)	Amaziah B. James (R)	John H. Starin (R)	Solomon; Bundy (R)	George A. Bagley (R)	William J. Bacon (R)	William H. Baker (R)	Frank; Hiscock (R)	John H. Camp (R)	Elbridge G. Lapham (R)	Jeremiah W. Dwight (R)	John N. Hungerford (R)	Elizur K. Hart (D)	Charles B. Benedict (D)	Daniel N. Lockwood (D)	George W. Patterson (R)	45th (1877–1879)
James W. Covert (D)	Daniel; O'Reilly (ID)	Simeon B. Chittenden (R)	Archibald; M. Bliss (D)	Nicholas; Muller (D)	Samuel S. Cox (D)	Edwin; Einstein (R)	Anson G. McCook (R)	Fernando; Wood (D)	James; O'Brien (D)	Levi P. Morton (R)	Waldo; Hutchins (D)	John H. Ketcham (R)	John W. Ferdon (R)	William; Lounsbery (D)	John Mosher; Bailey (R)	Walter A. Wood (R)	John; Hammond (R)	Amaziah B. James (R)	John H. Starin (R)	David; Wilber (R)	Warner; Miller (R)	Cyrus D. Prescott (R)	Joseph; Mason (R)	Frank; Hiscock (R)	John H. Camp (R)	Elbridge G. Lapham (R)	Jeremiah W. Dwight (R)	David P. Richardson (R)	John Van; Voorhis (R)	Richard; Crowley (R)	Ray V. Pierce (R)	Henry Van; Aernam (R)	46th (1879–1881)
Perry; Belmont (D)	William E. Robinson (D)	J. Hyatt; Smith (I)	Archibald; M. Bliss (D)	Benjamin; Wood (D)	Samuel S. Cox (D)	P. Henry; Dugro (D)	Anson G. McCook (R)	John; Hardy (D)	Abram; Hewitt (D)	Roswell P. Flower (D)	Waldo; Hutchins (D)	John H. Ketcham (R)	Lewis; Beach (D)	Thomas; Cornell (R)	Michael N. Nolan (D)	Walter A. Wood (R)	John; Hammond (R)	Abraham X. Parker (R)	George; West (R)	Ferris; Jacobs Jr. (R)	Charles R. Skinner (R)	Cyrus D. Prescott (R)	Joseph; Mason (R)	Frank; Hiscock (R)	John H. Camp (R)	James W. Wadsworth (R)	Jeremiah W. Dwight (R)	David P. Richardson (R)	John Van; Voorhis (R)	Richard; Crowley (R)	Jonathan; Scoville (D)	Henry Van; Aernam (R)	47th (1881–1883)

=== 1883–1903: 34 seats ===
Congress
48th
(1883–1885)
49th
(1885–1887)
50th
(1887–1889)
51st
(1889–1891)
52nd
(1891–1893)
53rd
(1893–1895)
54th
(1895–1897)
55th
(1897–1899)
56th
(1899–1901)
57th
(1901–1903)

District										District										District										District				Congress
1st	2nd	3rd	4th	5th	6th	7th	8th	9th	10th	11th	12th	13th	14th	15th	16th	17th	18th	19th	20th	21st	22nd	23rd	24th	25th	26th	27th	28th	29th	30th	31st	32nd	33rd	At-large	Congress
Perry; Belmont (D)	William E. Robinson (D)	Darwin R. James (R)	Felix; Campbell (D)	Nicholas; Muller (D)	Samuel S. Cox (D)	William; Dorsheimer (D)	John J. Adams (D)	John; Hardy (D)	Abram; Hewitt (D)	Orlando B. Potter (D)	Waldo; Hutchins (D)	John H. Ketcham (R)	Lewis; Beach (D)	John H. Bagley Jr. (D)	Thomas J. Van Alstyne (D)	Henry G. Burleigh (R)	Frederick A. Johnson (R)	Abraham X. Parker (R)	Edward; Wemple (D)	George W. Ray (R)	Charles R. Skinner (R)	John T. Spriggs (D)	Newton W. Nutting (R)	Frank; Hiscock (R)	Sereno E. Payne (R)	James W. Wadsworth (R)	Stephen C. Millard (R)	John; Arnot Jr. (D)	Halbert S. Greenleaf (D)	Robert S. Stevens (D)	William Findlay; Rogers (D)	Francis B. Brewer (R)	Henry Warner; Slocum (D)	48th (1883–1885)
Perry; Belmont (D)	Felix; Campbell (D)	Darwin R. James (R)	Peter P. Mahoney (D)	Archibald; M. Bliss (D)	Nicholas; Muller (D)	John J. Adams (D)	Samuel S. Cox (D)	Joseph; Pulitzer (D)	Abram; Hewitt (D)	Truman A. Merriman (ID)	Abraham; Dowdney (D)	Egbert; Ludovicus; Viele (D)	William G. Stahlnecker (D)	Lewis; Beach (D)	John H. Ketcham (R)	James; Girard; Lindsley (R)	Henry G. Burleigh (R)	John; Swinburne (R)	George; West (R)	Frederick A. Johnson (R)	Abraham X. Parker (R)	John T. Spriggs (D)	John S. Pindar (D)	Frank; Hiscock (R)	Stephen C. Millard (R)	Sereno E. Payne (R)	John; Arnot; Jr. (D)	Ira; Davenport (R)	Charles S. Baker (R)	John G. Sawyer (R)	John; McCreath; Farquhar (R)	John B. Weber (R)	34th	49th (1885–1887)
Perry; Belmont (D)	Felix; Campbell (D)	Darwin R. James (R)	Peter P. Mahoney (D)	Archibald; M. Bliss (D)	Nicholas; Muller (D)	John J. Adams (D)	Samuel S. Cox (D)	Joseph; Pulitzer (D)	Abram; Hewitt (D)	Truman A. Merriman (ID)	Abraham; Dowdney (D)	Egbert; Ludovicus; Viele (D)	William G. Stahlnecker (D)	Lewis; Beach (D)	John H. Ketcham (R)	James; Girard; Lindsley (R)	Henry G. Burleigh (R)	John; Swinburne (R)	George; West (R)	Frederick A. Johnson (R)	Abraham X. Parker (R)	John T. Spriggs (D)	John S. Pindar (D)	Frank; Hiscock (R)	Stephen C. Millard (R)	Sereno E. Payne (R)	John; Arnot; Jr. (D)	Ira; Davenport (R)	Charles S. Baker (R)	John G. Sawyer (R)	John; McCreath; Farquhar (R)	John B. Weber (R)	Walter L. Sessions (R)	49th (1885–1887)
Perry; Belmont (D)	Felix; Campbell (D)	Darwin R. James (R)	Peter P. Mahoney (D)	Archibald; M. Bliss (D)	Nicholas; Muller (D)	John J. Adams (D)	Timothy J. Campbell (D)	Samuel S. Cox (D)	Abram; Hewitt (D)	Truman A. Merriman (ID)	Abraham; Dowdney (D)	Egbert; Ludovicus; Viele (D)	William G. Stahlnecker (D)	Lewis; Beach (D)	John H. Ketcham (R)	James; Girard; Lindsley (R)	Henry G. Burleigh (R)	John; Swinburne (R)	George; West (R)	Frederick A. Johnson (R)	Abraham X. Parker (R)	John T. Spriggs (D)	John S. Pindar (D)	Frank; Hiscock (R)	Stephen C. Millard (R)	Sereno E. Payne (R)	John; Arnot; Jr. (D)	Ira; Davenport (R)	Charles S. Baker (R)	John G. Sawyer (R)	John; McCreath; Farquhar (R)	John B. Weber (R)	Walter L. Sessions (R)	49th (1885–1887)
Perry; Belmont (D)	Felix; Campbell (D)	Stephen V. White (R)	Peter P. Mahoney (D)	Archibald; M. Bliss (D)	Amos J. Cummings (D)	Lloyd; Bryce (D)	Timothy J. Campbell (D)	Samuel S. Cox (D)	Francis B. Spinola (D)	Truman A. Merriman (D)	Bourke; Cockran (D)	Ashbel P. Fitch (R)	William G. Stahlnecker (D)	Henry; Bacon (D)	John H. Ketcham (R)	Stephen T. Hopkins (R)	Edward W. Greenman (D)	Charles; Tracey (D)	George; West (R)	John H. Moffitt (R)	Abraham X. Parker (R)	James S. Sherman (R)	David; Wilber (R)	James J. Belden (R)	Milton; De Lano (R)	Newton W. Nutting (R)	Thomas S. Flood (R)	Ira; Davenport (R)	Charles S. Baker (R)	John G. Sawyer (R)	John; McCreath; Farquhar (R)	John B. Weber (R)	William G. Laidlaw (R)	50th (1887–1889)
James W. Covert (D)	Felix; Campbell (D)	William C. Wallace (R)	John; Michael; Clancy (D)	Thomas F. Magner (D)	Frank T. Fitzgerald (D)	Edward J. Dunphy (D)	John H. McCarthy (D)	Samuel S. Cox (D)	Francis B. Spinola (D)	John; Quinn (D)	Roswell P. Flower (D)	Ashbel P. Fitch (D)	William G. Stahlnecker (D)	Moses D. Stivers (R)	John H. Ketcham (R)	Charles J. Knapp (R)	John A. Quackenbush (R)	Charles; Tracey (D)	John; Sanford (R)	John H. Moffitt (R)	Frederick; Lansing (R)	James S. Sherman (R)	David; Wilber (R)	James J. Belden (R)	Milton; De Lano (R)	Newton W. Nutting (R)	Thomas S. Flood (R)	John; Raines (R)	Charles S. Baker (R)	John G. Sawyer (R)	John; McCreath; Farquhar (R)	John M. Wiley (D)	William G. Laidlaw (R)	51st (1889–1891)
James W. Covert (D)	Felix; Campbell (D)	William C. Wallace (R)	John; Michael; Clancy (D)	Thomas F. Magner (D)	Charles H. Turner (D)	Edward J. Dunphy (D)	John H. McCarthy (D)	Amos J. Cummings (D)	Francis B. Spinola (D)	John; Quinn (D)	Roswell P. Flower (D)	Ashbel P. Fitch (D)	William G. Stahlnecker (D)	Moses D. Stivers (R)	John H. Ketcham (R)	Charles J. Knapp (R)	John A. Quackenbush (R)	Charles; Tracey (D)	John; Sanford (R)	John H. Moffitt (R)	Frederick; Lansing (R)	James S. Sherman (R)	John S. Pindar (D)	James J. Belden (R)	Milton; De Lano (R)	Sereno E. Payne (R)	Thomas S. Flood (R)	John; Raines (R)	Charles S. Baker (R)	John G. Sawyer (R)	John; McCreath; Farquhar (R)	John M. Wiley (D)	William G. Laidlaw (R)	51st (1889–1891)
James W. Covert (D)	David A. Boody (D)	William J. Coombs (D)	John; Michael; Clancy (D)	Thomas F. Magner (D)	John R. Fellows (D)	Edward J. Dunphy (D)	Timothy J. Campbell (D)	Amos J. Cummings (D)	Francis B. Spinola (D)	J. De Witt; Warner (D)	Roswell P. Flower (D)	Ashbel P. Fitch (D)	William G. Stahlnecker (D)	Henry; Bacon (D)	John H. Ketcham (R)	Isaac N. Cox (D)	John A. Quackenbush (R)	Charles; Tracey (D)	John; Sanford (R)	John M. Wever (R)	Leslie W. Russell (R)	Henry; Wilbur; Bentley (D)	George; Van Horn (D)	James J. Belden (R)	George W. Ray (R)	Sereno E. Payne (R)	Hosea H. Rockwell (D)	John; Raines (R)	Halbert S. Greenleaf (D)	James W. Wadsworth (R)	Daniel N. Lockwood (D)	Thomas L. Bunting (D)	Warren B. Hooker (R)	52nd (1891–1893)
James W. Covert (D)	Alfred C. Chapin (D)	William J. Coombs (D)	John; Michael; Clancy (D)	Thomas F. Magner (D)	John R. Fellows (D)	Edward J. Dunphy (D)	Timothy J. Campbell (D)	Amos J. Cummings (D)	Bourke; Cockran (D)	J. De Witt; Warner (D)	Joseph J. Little (D)	Ashbel P. Fitch (D)	William G. Stahlnecker (D)	Henry; Bacon (D)	John H. Ketcham (R)	Isaac N. Cox (D)	John A. Quackenbush (R)	Charles; Tracey (D)	John; Sanford (R)	John M. Wever (R)	Newton; Martin; Curtis (R)	Henry; Wilbur; Bentley (D)	George; Van Horn (D)	James J. Belden (R)	George W. Ray (R)	Sereno E. Payne (R)	Hosea H. Rockwell (D)	John; Raines (R)	Halbert S. Greenleaf (D)	James W. Wadsworth (R)	Daniel N. Lockwood (D)	Thomas L. Bunting (D)	Warren B. Hooker (R)	52nd (1891–1893)
James W. Covert (D)	John Michael; Clancy (D)	Joseph C. Hendrix (D)	William J. Coombs (D)	John H. Graham (D)	Thomas F. Magner (D)	Franklin; Bartlett (D)	Edward J. Dunphy (D)	Timothy J. Campbell (D)	Daniel; Sickles (D)	Amos J. Cummings (D)	Bourke; Cockran (D)	J. De Witt; Warner (D)	John R. Fellows (D)	Ashbel P. Fitch (D)	William; Ryan (D)	Francis; Marvin (R)	Jacob; LeFever (R)	Charles; Delemere; Haines (D)	Charles; Tracey (D)	Simon J. Schermerhorn (D)	Newton; Martin; Curtis (R)	John M. Wever (R)	Charles A. Chickering (R)	James S. Sherman (R)	George W. Ray (R)	James J. Belden (R)	Sereno E. Payne (R)	Charles W. Gillet (R)	James W. Wadsworth (R)	John Van; Voorhis (R)	Daniel N. Lockwood (D)	Charles; Daniels (R)	Warren B. Hooker (R)	53rd (1893–1895)
James W. Covert (D)	John Michael; Clancy (D)	Joseph C. Hendrix (D)	William J. Coombs (D)	John H. Graham (D)	Thomas F. Magner (D)	Franklin; Bartlett (D)	Edward J. Dunphy (D)	Timothy J. Campbell (D)	Daniel; Sickles (D)	Amos J. Cummings (D)	Bourke; Cockran (D)	J. De Witt; Warner (D)	Lemuel E. Quigg (R)	Isidor; Straus (D)	William; Ryan (D)	Francis; Marvin (R)	Jacob; LeFever (R)	Charles; Delemere; Haines (D)	Charles; Tracey (D)	Simon J. Schermerhorn (D)	Newton; Martin; Curtis (R)	John M. Wever (R)	Charles A. Chickering (R)	James S. Sherman (R)	George W. Ray (R)	James J. Belden (R)	Sereno E. Payne (R)	Charles W. Gillet (R)	James W. Wadsworth (R)	John Van; Voorhis (R)	Daniel N. Lockwood (D)	Charles; Daniels (R)	Warren B. Hooker (R)	53rd (1893–1895)
Richard C. McCormick (R)	Denis M. Hurley (R)	Francis H. Wilson (R)	Israel F. Fischer (R)	Charles G. Bennett (R)	James R. Howe (R)	Franklin; Bartlett (D)	James J. Walsh (D)	Henry C. Miner (D)	Amos J. Cummings (D)	William; Sulzer (D)	George B. McClellan; Jr. (D)	Richard C. Shannon (R)	Lemuel E. Quigg (R)	Philip B. Low (R)	Benjamin L. Fairchild (R)	Benjamin; Odell (R)	Jacob; LeFever (R)	Frank S. Black (R)	George N. Southwick (R)	David F. Wilber (R)	Newton; Martin; Curtis (R)	Wallace T. Foote; Jr. (R)	Charles A. Chickering (R)	James S. Sherman (R)	George W. Ray (R)	Theodore L. Poole (R)	Sereno E. Payne (R)	Charles W. Gillet (R)	James W. Wadsworth (R)	Henry C. Brewster (R)	Rowland B. Mahany (R)	Charles; Daniels (R)	Warren B. Hooker (R)	54th (1895–1897)
Joseph M. Belford (R)	Denis M. Hurley (R)	Edmund H. Driggs (D)	Israel F. Fischer (R)	Charles G. Bennett (R)	James R. Howe (R)	John H. G. Vehslage (D)	John M. Mitchell (R)	Thomas J. Bradley (D)	Amos J. Cummings (D)	William; Sulzer (D)	George B. McClellan; Jr. (D)	Richard C. Shannon (R)	Lemuel E. Quigg (R)	Philip B. Low (R)	William L. Ward (R)	Benjamin; Odell (R)	John H. Ketcham (R)	Aaron; Van Schaick; Cochrane (R)	George N. Southwick (R)	David F. Wilber (R)	Lucius; Littauer (R)	Wallace T. Foote; Jr. (R)	Charles A. Chickering (R)	James S. Sherman (R)	George W. Ray (R)	James J. Belden (R)	Sereno E. Payne (R)	Charles W. Gillet (R)	James W. Wadsworth (R)	Henry C. Brewster (R)	Rowland B. Mahany (R)	De Alva S. Alexander (R)	Warren B. Hooker (R)	55th (1897–1899)
Townsend; Scudder (D)	John J. Fitzgerald (D)	Edmund H. Driggs (D)	Bertram T. Clayton (D)	Frank E. Wilson (D)	Mitchell; May (D)	Nicholas; Muller (D)	Daniel J. Riordan (D)	Thomas J. Bradley (D)	Amos J. Cummings (D)	William; Sulzer (D)	George B. McClellan; Jr. (D)	Jefferson; Monroe; Levy (D)	William A. Chanler (D)	Jacob; Ruppert (D)	John Q. Underhill (D)	Arthur S. Tompkins (R)	John H. Ketcham (R)	Aaron; Van Schaick; Cochrane (R)	Martin H. Glynn (D)	John; Knox; Stewart (R)	Lucius; Littauer (R)	Louis W. Emerson (R)	Charles A. Chickering (R)	James S. Sherman (R)	George W. Ray (R)	Michael E. Driscoll (R)	Sereno E. Payne (R)	Charles W. Gillet (R)	James W. Wadsworth (R)	James M. E. O'Grady (R)	William H. Ryan (D)	De Alva S. Alexander (R)	Edward B. Vreeland (R)	56th (1899–1901)
Townsend; Scudder (D)	John J. Fitzgerald (D)	Edmund H. Driggs (D)	Bertram T. Clayton (D)	Frank E. Wilson (D)	Mitchell; May (D)	Nicholas; Muller (D)	Daniel J. Riordan (D)	Thomas J. Bradley (D)	Amos J. Cummings (D)	William; Sulzer (D)	George B. McClellan; Jr. (D)	Jefferson; Monroe; Levy (D)	William A. Chanler (D)	Jacob; Ruppert (D)	John Q. Underhill (D)	Arthur S. Tompkins (R)	John H. Ketcham (R)	Aaron; Van Schaick; Cochrane (R)	Martin H. Glynn (D)	John; Knox; Stewart (R)	Lucius; Littauer (R)	Louis W. Emerson (R)	Albert D. Shaw (R)	James S. Sherman (R)	George W. Ray (R)	Michael E. Driscoll (R)	Sereno E. Payne (R)	Charles W. Gillet (R)	James W. Wadsworth (R)	James M. E. O'Grady (R)	William H. Ryan (D)	De Alva S. Alexander (R)	Edward B. Vreeland (R)	56th (1899–1901)
Frederic; Storm (R)	John J. Fitzgerald (D)	Henry; Bristow (R)	Harry A. Hanbury (R)	Frank E. Wilson (D)	George H. Lindsay (D)	Nicholas; Muller (D)	Thomas J. Creamer (D)	Henry M. Goldfogle (D)	Edward; Swann (D)	William; Sulzer (D)	George B. McClellan; Jr. (D)	Oliver; Belmont (D)	William H. Douglas (R)	Jacob; Ruppert (D)	Cornelius; Amory; Pugsley (D)	Arthur S. Tompkins (R)	John H. Ketcham (R)	William; Henry; Draper (R)	George N. Southwick (R)	John; Knox; Stewart (R)	Lucius; Littauer (R)	Louis W. Emerson (R)	Charles L. Knapp (R)	James S. Sherman (R)	George W. Ray (R)	Michael E. Driscoll (R)	Sereno E. Payne (R)	Charles W. Gillet (R)	James W. Wadsworth (R)	James; Breck; Perkins (R)	William H. Ryan (D)	De Alva S. Alexander (R)	Edward B. Vreeland (R)	57th (1901–1903)
Frederic; Storm (R)	John J. Fitzgerald (D)	Henry; Bristow (R)	Harry A. Hanbury (R)	Frank E. Wilson (D)	George H. Lindsay (D)	Montague; Lessler (R)	Thomas J. Creamer (D)	Henry M. Goldfogle (D)	Edward; Swann (D)	William; Sulzer (D)	George B. McClellan; Jr. (D)	Oliver; Belmont (D)	William H. Douglas (R)	Jacob; Ruppert (D)	Cornelius; Amory; Pugsley (D)	Arthur S. Tompkins (R)	John H. Ketcham (R)	William; Henry; Draper (R)	George N. Southwick (R)	John; Knox; Stewart (R)	Lucius; Littauer (R)	Louis W. Emerson (R)	Charles L. Knapp (R)	James S. Sherman (R)	George W. Ray (R)	Michael E. Driscoll (R)	Sereno E. Payne (R)	Charles W. Gillet (R)	James W. Wadsworth (R)	James; Breck; Perkins (R)	William H. Ryan (D)	De Alva S. Alexander (R)	Edward B. Vreeland (R)	57th (1901–1903)

=== 1903–1913: 37 seats ===
After the 1900 census, New York gained three seats.

Congress
58th
(1903–1905)
59th
(1905–1907)
60th
(1907–1909)
61st
(1909–1911)
62nd
(1911–1913)

District										District										District										District							Congress
1st	2nd	3rd	4th	5th	6th	7th	8th	9th	10th	11th	12th	13th	14th	15th	16th	17th	18th	19th	20th	21st	22nd	23rd	24th	25th	26th	27th	28th	29th	30th	31st	32nd	33rd	34th	35th	36th	37th	Congress
Townsend; Scudder (D)	George; H. Lindsay (D)	Charles T. Dunwell (R)	Frank E. Wilson (D)	Edward; Bassett (D)	Robert; Baker (D)	John J. Fitzgerald (D)	Timothy; Sullivan (D)	Henry M. Goldfogle (D)	William; Sulzer (D)	William; Randolph; Hearst (D)	William; Bourke; Cockran (D)	F. B. Harrison (D)	Ira E. Rider (D)	William H. Douglas (R)	Jacob; Ruppert (D)	Francis E. Shober (D)	Joseph A. Goulden (D)	Norton P. Otis (R)	Thomas; W. Bradley (R)	John H. Ketcham (R)	William; Henry; Draper (R)	George N. Southwick (R)	George J. Smith (R)	Lucius; Littauer (R)	William; H. Flack (R)	James S. Sherman (R)	Charles L. Knapp (R)	Michael; E. Driscoll (R)	John; Wilbur; Dwight (R)	Sereno; E. Payne (R)	James; Breck; Perkins (R)	Charles W. Gillet (R)	James W. Wadsworth (R)	William; H. Ryan (D)	De Alva S. Alexander (R)	Edward; B. Vreeland (R)	58th (1903–1905)
William W. Cocks (R)	George; H. Lindsay (D)	Charles T. Dunwell (R)	Charles B. Law (R)	George E. Waldo (R)	William; M. Calder (R)	John J. Fitzgerald (D)	Timothy; Sullivan (D)	Henry M. Goldfogle (D)	William; Sulzer (D)	William; Randolph; Hearst (D)	William; Bourke; Cockran (D)	Herbert; Parsons (R)	Charles A. Towne (D)	J. Van; Vechten; Olcott (R)	Jacob; Ruppert (D)	William; Stiles; Bennet (R)	Joseph A. Goulden (D)	John; Emory; Andrus (R)	Thomas; W. Bradley (R)	John H. Ketcham (R)	William; Henry; Draper (R)	George N. Southwick (R)	Frank J. LeFevre (R)	Lucius; Littauer (R)	William; H. Flack (R)	James S. Sherman (R)	Charles L. Knapp (R)	Michael; E. Driscoll (R)	John; Wilbur; Dwight (R)	Sereno; E. Payne (R)	James; Breck; Perkins (R)	Jacob; Sloat; Fassett (R)	James W. Wadsworth (R)	William; H. Ryan (D)	De Alva S. Alexander (R)	Edward; B. Vreeland (R)	59th (1905–1907)
William W. Cocks (R)	George; H. Lindsay (D)	Charles T. Dunwell (R)	Charles B. Law (R)	George E. Waldo (R)	William; M. Calder (R)	John J. Fitzgerald (D)	Daniel J. Riordan (D)	Henry M. Goldfogle (D)	William; Sulzer (D)	Charles V. Fornes (D)	William; Bourke; Cockran (D)	Herbert; Parsons (R)	William; Willett; Jr. (D)	J. Van; Vechten; Olcott (R)	Francis; Burton; Harrison (D)	William; Stiles; Bennet (R)	Joseph A. Goulden (D)	John; Emory; Andrus (R)	Thomas; W. Bradley (R)	Samuel; McMillan (R)	William; Henry; Draper (R)	George N. Southwick (R)	George; Winthrop; Fairchild (R)	Cyrus; Durey (R)	George; R. Malby (R)	James S. Sherman (R)	Charles L. Knapp (R)	Michael; E. Driscoll (R)	John; Wilbur; Dwight (R)	Sereno; E. Payne (R)	James; Breck; Perkins (R)	Jacob; Sloat; Fassett (R)	Peter A. Porter (IR)	William; H. Ryan (D)	De Alva S. Alexander (R)	Edward; B. Vreeland (R)	60th (1907–1909)
William W. Cocks (R)	George; H. Lindsay (D)	Otto G. Foelker (R)	Charles B. Law (R)	Richard; Young (R)	William; M. Calder (R)	John J. Fitzgerald (D)	Daniel J. Riordan (D)	Henry M. Goldfogle (D)	William; Sulzer (D)	Charles V. Fornes (D)	Michael; F. Conry (D)	Herbert; Parsons (R)	William; Willett; Jr. (D)	J. Van; Vechten; Olcott (R)	Francis; Burton; Harrison (D)	William; Stiles; Bennet (R)	Joseph A. Goulden (D)	John; Emory; Andrus (R)	Thomas; W. Bradley (R)	Hamilton; Fish II (R)	William; Henry; Draper (R)	George N. Southwick (R)	George; Winthrop; Fairchild (R)	Cyrus; Durey (R)	George; R. Malby (R)	Charles S. Millington (R)	Charles L. Knapp (R)	Michael; E. Driscoll (R)	John; Wilbur; Dwight (R)	Sereno; E. Payne (R)	James; Breck; Perkins (R)	Jacob; Sloat; Fassett (R)	James S. Simmons (R)	Daniel A. Driscoll (D)	De Alva S. Alexander (R)	Edward; B. Vreeland (R)	61st (1909–1911)
William W. Cocks (R)	George; H. Lindsay (D)	Otto G. Foelker (R)	Charles B. Law (R)	Richard; Young (R)	William; M. Calder (R)	John J. Fitzgerald (D)	Daniel J. Riordan (D)	Henry M. Goldfogle (D)	William; Sulzer (D)	Charles V. Fornes (D)	Michael; F. Conry (D)	Herbert; Parsons (R)	William; Willett; Jr. (D)	J. Van; Vechten; Olcott (R)	Francis; Burton; Harrison (D)	William; Stiles; Bennet (R)	Joseph A. Goulden (D)	John; Emory; Andrus (R)	Thomas; W. Bradley (R)	Hamilton; Fish II (R)	William; Henry; Draper (R)	George N. Southwick (R)	George; Winthrop; Fairchild (R)	Cyrus; Durey (R)	George; R. Malby (R)	Charles S. Millington (R)	Charles L. Knapp (R)	Michael; E. Driscoll (R)	John; Wilbur; Dwight (R)	Sereno; E. Payne (R)	James S. Havens (D)	Jacob; Sloat; Fassett (R)	James S. Simmons (R)	Daniel A. Driscoll (D)	De Alva S. Alexander (R)	Edward; B. Vreeland (R)	61st (1909–1911)
Martin W. Littleton (D)	George; H. Lindsay (D)	James P. Maher (D)	Frank E. Wilson (D)	William C. Redfield (D)	William; M. Calder (R)	John J. Fitzgerald (D)	Daniel J. Riordan (D)	Henry M. Goldfogle (D)	William; Sulzer (D)	Charles V. Fornes (D)	Michael; F. Conry (D)	Jefferson; M. Levy (D)	John J. Kindred (D)	Thomas G. Patten (D)	Francis; Burton; Harrison (D)	Henry; George Jr. (D)	Steven B. Ayres (ID)	John; Emory; Andrus (R)	Thomas; W. Bradley (R)	Richard E. Connell (D)	William; Henry; Draper (R)	Henry S. De; Forest (R)	George; Winthrop; Fairchild (R)	Theron; Akin (R)	George; R. Malby (R)	Charles A. Talcott (D)	Luther W. Mott (R)	Michael; E. Driscoll (R)	John; Wilbur; Dwight (R)	Sereno; E. Payne (R)	Henry G. Danforth (R)	Edwin S. Underhill (D)	James S. Simmons (R)	Daniel A. Driscoll (D)	Charles B. Smith (D)	Edward; B. Vreeland (R)	62nd (1911–1913)

=== 1913–1933: 43 seats ===
After the 1910 census, New York gained six seats.

Congress
63rd
(1913–1915)
64th
(1915–1917)
65th
(1917–1919)
66th
(1919–1921)
67th
(1921–1923)
68th
(1923–1925)
69th
(1925–1927)
70th
(1927–1929)
71st
(1929–1931)
72nd
(1931–1933)

District										District										District										District										District			Congress
1st	2nd	3rd	4th	5th	6th	7th	8th	9th	10th	11th	12th	13th	14th	15th	16th	17th	18th	19th	20th	21st	22nd	23rd	24th	25th	26th	27th	28th	29th	30th	31st	32nd	33rd	34th	35th	36th	37th	38th	39th	40th	41st	42nd	43rd	Congress
Lathrop; Brown (D)	Dennis; O'Leary (D)	Frank E. Wilson (D)	Harry H. Dale (D)	James P. Maher (D)	William M. Calder (R)	John J. Fitzgerald (D)	Daniel J. Griffin (D)	James H. O'Brien (D)	Herman; A. Metz (D)	Daniel J. Riordan (D)	Henry M. Goldfogle (D)	Timothy; Sullivan (D)	Jefferson; Monroe; Levy (D)	Michael F. Conry (D)	Peter J. Dooling (D)	John F. Carew (D)	Thomas G. Patten (D)	Walter M. Chandler (Prog)	F. B. Harrison (D)	Henry; George; Jr. (D)	Henry; Bruckner (D)	Joseph A. Goulden (D)	Woodson R. Oglesby (D)	Benjamin; I. Taylor (D)	Edmund; Platt (R)	George B. McClellan; Jr. (D)	Peter G. Ten Eyck (D)	James; S. Parker (R)	Samuel; Wallin (R)	Edwin; Albert; Merritt (R)	Luther W. Mott (R)	Charles A. Talcott (D)	George; Winthrop; Fairchild (R)	John R. Clancy (D)	Sereno; E. Payne (R)	Edwin S. Underhill (D)	Thomas B. Dunn (R)	Henry G. Danforth (R)	Robert H. Gittins (D)	Charles; Bennett; Smith (D)	Daniel A. Driscoll (D)	Charles; Mann; Hamilton (R)	63rd (1913–1915)
Lathrop; Brown (D)	Dennis; O'Leary (D)	Frank E. Wilson (D)	Harry H. Dale (D)	James P. Maher (D)	William M. Calder (R)	John J. Fitzgerald (D)	Daniel J. Griffin (D)	James H. O'Brien (D)	Herman; A. Metz (D)	Daniel J. Riordan (D)	Henry M. Goldfogle (D)	George W. Loft (D)	Jefferson; Monroe; Levy (D)	Michael F. Conry (D)	Peter J. Dooling (D)	John F. Carew (D)	Thomas G. Patten (D)	Walter M. Chandler (Prog)	Jacob A. Cantor (D)	Henry; George; Jr. (D)	Henry; Bruckner (D)	Joseph A. Goulden (D)	Woodson R. Oglesby (D)	Benjamin; I. Taylor (D)	Edmund; Platt (R)	George B. McClellan; Jr. (D)	Peter G. Ten Eyck (D)	James; S. Parker (R)	Samuel; Wallin (R)	Edwin; Albert; Merritt (R)	Luther W. Mott (R)	Charles A. Talcott (D)	George; Winthrop; Fairchild (R)	John R. Clancy (D)	Sereno; E. Payne (R)	Edwin S. Underhill (D)	Thomas B. Dunn (R)	Henry G. Danforth (R)	Robert H. Gittins (D)	Charles; Bennett; Smith (D)	Daniel A. Driscoll (D)	Charles; Mann; Hamilton (R)	63rd (1913–1915)
Frederick; C. Hicks (R)	C. Pope; Caldwell (D)	Joseph V. Flynn (D)	Harry H. Dale (D)	James P. Maher (D)	Frederick; W. Rowe (R)	John J. Fitzgerald (D)	Daniel J. Griffin (D)	Oscar W. Swift (R)	Reuben; L. Haskell (R)	Daniel J. Riordan (D)	Meyer; London (Soc)	George W. Loft (D)	Michael F. Farley (D)	Michael F. Conry (D)	Peter J. Dooling (D)	John F. Carew (D)	Thomas G. Patten (D)	Walter M. Chandler (Prog)	Isaac; Siegel (R)	George; Murray; Hulbert (D)	Henry; Bruckner (D)	William Stiles; Bennet (R)	Woodson R. Oglesby (D)	James W. Husted (R)	Edmund; Platt (R)	Charles B. Ward (R)	Rollin B. Sanford (R)	James; S. Parker (R)	William B. Charles (R)	Bertrand; Snell (R)	Luther W. Mott (R)	Homer P. Snyder (R)	George; Winthrop; Fairchild (R)	Walter; W. Magee (R)	Norman; J. Gould (R)	Harry H. Pratt (R)	Thomas B. Dunn (R)	Henry G. Danforth (R)	S. Wallace; Dempsey (R)	Charles; Bennett; Smith (D)	Daniel A. Driscoll (D)	Charles; Mann; Hamilton (R)	64th (1915–1917)
Frederick; C. Hicks (R)	C. Pope; Caldwell (D)	Joseph V. Flynn (D)	Harry H. Dale (D)	James P. Maher (D)	Frederick; W. Rowe (R)	John J. Delaney (D)	Daniel J. Griffin (D)	Oscar W. Swift (R)	Reuben; L. Haskell (R)	Daniel J. Riordan (D)	Meyer; London (Soc)	Christopher; D. Sullivan (D)	Fiorello La; Guardia (R)	Thomas F. Smith (D)	Peter J. Dooling (D)	John F. Carew (D)	George B. Francis (R)	Walter M. Chandler (R)	Isaac; Siegel (R)	George; Murray; Hulbert (D)	Anthony; J. Griffin (D)	Daniel C. Oliver (D)	Benjamin L. Fairchild (R)	James W. Husted (R)	Edmund; Platt (R)	Charles B. Ward (R)	Rollin B. Sanford (R)	James; S. Parker (R)	George R. Lunn (D)	Bertrand; Snell (R)	Luther W. Mott (R)	Homer P. Snyder (R)	George; Winthrop; Fairchild (R)	Walter; W. Magee (R)	Norman; J. Gould (R)	Harry H. Pratt (R)	Thomas B. Dunn (R)	Archie; D. Sanders (R)	S. Wallace; Dempsey (R)	Charles; Bennett; Smith (D)	William F. Waldow (R)	Charles; Mann; Hamilton (R)	65th (1917–1919)
Frederick; C. Hicks (R)	C. Pope; Caldwell (D)	John; MacCrate (R)	Thomas; H. Cullen (D)	John B. Johnston (D)	Frederick; W. Rowe (R)	James P. Maher (D)	William E. Cleary (D)	David J. O'Connell (D)	Reuben; L. Haskell (R)	Daniel J. Riordan (D)	Henry M. Goldfogle (D)	Christopher; D. Sullivan (D)	Fiorello La; Guardia (R)	Peter J. Dooling (D)	Thomas F. Smith (D)	Herbert; Pell (D)	John F. Carew (D)	Joseph; Rowan (D)	Isaac; Siegel (R)	Jerome F. Donovan (D)	Anthony; J. Griffin (D)	Richard F. McKiniry (D)	James V. Ganly (D)	James W. Husted (R)	Edmund; Platt (R)	Charles B. Ward (R)	Rollin B. Sanford (R)	James; S. Parker (R)	Frank; Crowther (R)	Bertrand; Snell (R)	Luther W. Mott (R)	Homer P. Snyder (R)	William; H. Hill (R)	Walter; W. Magee (R)	Norman; J. Gould (R)	Alanson B. Houghton (R)	Thomas B. Dunn (R)	Archie; D. Sanders (R)	S. Wallace; Dempsey (R)	Clarence; MacGregor (R)	James M. Mead (D)	Daniel A. Reed (R)	66th (1919–1921)
Frederick; C. Hicks (R)	C. Pope; Caldwell (D)	John; MacCrate (R)	Thomas; H. Cullen (D)	John B. Johnston (D)	Frederick; W. Rowe (R)	James P. Maher (D)	William E. Cleary (D)	David J. O'Connell (D)	Lester D. Volk (R)	Daniel J. Riordan (D)	Henry M. Goldfogle (D)	Christopher; D. Sullivan (D)	Nathan D. Perlman (R)	Peter J. Dooling (D)	Thomas F. Smith (D)	Herbert; Pell (D)	John F. Carew (D)	Joseph; Rowan (D)	Isaac; Siegel (R)	Jerome F. Donovan (D)	Anthony; J. Griffin (D)	Richard F. McKiniry (D)	James V. Ganly (D)	James W. Husted (R)	Hamilton; Fish III (R)	Charles B. Ward (R)	Rollin B. Sanford (R)	James; S. Parker (R)	Frank; Crowther (R)	Bertrand; Snell (R)	Luther W. Mott (R)	Homer P. Snyder (R)	William; H. Hill (R)	Walter; W. Magee (R)	Norman; J. Gould (R)	Alanson B. Houghton (R)	Thomas B. Dunn (R)	Archie; D. Sanders (R)	S. Wallace; Dempsey (R)	Clarence; MacGregor (R)	James M. Mead (D)	Daniel A. Reed (R)	66th (1919–1921)
Frederick; C. Hicks (R)	John J. Kindred (D)	John; Kissel (R)	Thomas; H. Cullen (D)	Ardolph L. Kline (R)	Warren I. Lee (R)	Michael J. Hogan (R)	Charles G. Bond (R)	Andrew; Petersen (R)	Lester D. Volk (R)	Daniel J. Riordan (D)	Meyer; London (Soc)	Christopher; D. Sullivan (D)	Nathan D. Perlman (R)	Thomas J. Ryan (R)	Bourke; Cockran (D)	Ogden L. Mills (R)	John F. Carew (D)	Walter M. Chandler (R)	Isaac; Siegel (R)	Martin C. Ansorge (R)	Anthony; J. Griffin (D)	Albert B. Rossdale (R)	Benjamin L. Fairchild (R)	James W. Husted (R)	Hamilton; Fish III (R)	Charles B. Ward (R)	Peter G. Ten Eyck (D)	James; S. Parker (R)	Frank; Crowther (R)	Bertrand; Snell (R)	Luther W. Mott (R)	Homer P. Snyder (R)	John D. Clarke (R)	Walter; W. Magee (R)	Norman; J. Gould (R)	Alanson B. Houghton (R)	Thomas B. Dunn (R)	Archie; D. Sanders (R)	S. Wallace; Dempsey (R)	Clarence; MacGregor (R)	James M. Mead (D)	Daniel A. Reed (R)	67th (1921–1923)
Robert L. Bacon (R)	John J. Kindred (D)	George W. Lindsay (D)	Thomas; H. Cullen (D)	Loring M. Black Jr. (D)	Charles I. Stengle (D)	John; Quayle (D)	William E. Cleary (D)	David J. O'Connell (D)	Emanuel; Celler (D)	Daniel J. Riordan (D)	Samuel; Dickstein (D)	Christopher; D. Sullivan (D)	Nathan D. Perlman (R)	John J. Boylan (D)	John J. O'Connor (D)	Ogden L. Mills (R)	John F. Carew (D)	Sol; Bloom (D)	Fiorello; La Guardia (R)	Royal; Hurlburt; Weller (D)	Anthony; J. Griffin (D)	Frank A. Oliver (D)	James V. Ganly (D)	J. Mayhew; Wainwright (R)	Hamilton; Fish III (R)	Charles B. Ward (R)	Parker; Corning (D)	James; S. Parker (R)	Frank; Crowther (R)	Bertrand; Snell (R)	Luther W. Mott (R)	Homer P. Snyder (R)	John D. Clarke (R)	Walter; W. Magee (R)	John; Taber (R)	Gale H. Stalker (R)	Meyer; Jacobstein (D)	Archie; D. Sanders (R)	S. Wallace; Dempsey (R)	Clarence; MacGregor (R)	James M. Mead (D)	Daniel A. Reed (R)	68th (1923–1925)
Robert L. Bacon (R)	John J. Kindred (D)	George W. Lindsay (D)	Thomas; H. Cullen (D)	Loring M. Black Jr. (D)	Charles I. Stengle (D)	John; Quayle (D)	William E. Cleary (D)	David J. O'Connell (D)	Emanuel; Celler (D)	Anning; Smith; Prall (D)	Samuel; Dickstein (D)	Christopher; D. Sullivan (D)	Nathan D. Perlman (R)	John J. Boylan (D)	John J. O'Connor (D)	Ogden L. Mills (R)	John F. Carew (D)	Sol; Bloom (D)	Fiorello; La Guardia (R)	Royal; Hurlburt; Weller (D)	Anthony; J. Griffin (D)	Frank A. Oliver (D)	Benjamin L. Fairchild (R)	J. Mayhew; Wainwright (R)	Hamilton; Fish III (R)	Charles B. Ward (R)	Parker; Corning (D)	James; S. Parker (R)	Frank; Crowther (R)	Bertrand; Snell (R)	Thaddeus; C. Sweet (R)	Homer P. Snyder (R)	John D. Clarke (R)	Walter; W. Magee (R)	John; Taber (R)	Gale H. Stalker (R)	Meyer; Jacobstein (D)	Archie; D. Sanders (R)	S. Wallace; Dempsey (R)	Clarence; MacGregor (R)	James M. Mead (D)	Daniel A. Reed (R)	68th (1923–1925)
Robert L. Bacon (R)	John J. Kindred (D)	George W. Lindsay (D)	Thomas; H. Cullen (D)	Loring M. Black Jr. (D)	Andrew; Lawrence; Somers (D)	John; Quayle (D)	William E. Cleary (D)	David J. O'Connell (D)	Emanuel; Celler (D)	Anning; Smith; Prall (D)	Samuel; Dickstein (D)	Christopher; D. Sullivan (D)	Nathan D. Perlman (R)	John J. Boylan (D)	John J. O'Connor (D)	Ogden L. Mills (R)	John F. Carew (D)	Sol; Bloom (D)	Fiorello; La Guardia (R)	Royal; Hurlburt; Weller (D)	Anthony; J. Griffin (D)	Frank A. Oliver (D)	Benjamin L. Fairchild (R)	J. Mayhew; Wainwright (R)	Hamilton; Fish III (R)	Harcourt; J. Pratt (R)	Parker; Corning (D)	James; S. Parker (R)	Frank; Crowther (R)	Bertrand; Snell (R)	Thaddeus; C. Sweet (R)	Frederick; M. Davenport (R)	Harold S. Tolley (R)	Walter; W. Magee (R)	John; Taber (R)	Gale H. Stalker (R)	Meyer; Jacobstein (D)	Archie; D. Sanders (R)	S. Wallace; Dempsey (R)	Clarence; MacGregor (R)	James M. Mead (D)	Daniel A. Reed (R)	69th (1925–1927)
Robert L. Bacon (R)	John J. Kindred (D)	George W. Lindsay (D)	Thomas; H. Cullen (D)	Loring M. Black Jr. (D)	Andrew; Lawrence; Somers (D)	John; Quayle (D)	Patrick J. Carley (D)	David J. O'Connell (D)	Emanuel; Celler (D)	Anning; Smith; Prall (D)	Samuel; Dickstein (D)	Christopher; D. Sullivan (D)	William I. Sirovich (D)	John J. Boylan (D)	John J. O'Connor (D)	William W. Cohen (D)	John F. Carew (D)	Sol; Bloom (D)	Fiorello; La Guardia (R)	Royal; Hurlburt; Weller (D)	Anthony; J. Griffin (D)	Frank A. Oliver (D)	James M. Fitzpatrick (D)	J. Mayhew; Wainwright (R)	Hamilton; Fish III (R)	Harcourt; J. Pratt (R)	Parker; Corning (D)	James; S. Parker (R)	Frank; Crowther (R)	Bertrand; Snell (R)	Thaddeus; C. Sweet (R)	Frederick; M. Davenport (R)	John D. Clarke (R)	Walter; W. Magee (R)	John; Taber (R)	Gale H. Stalker (R)	Meyer; Jacobstein (D)	Archie; D. Sanders (R)	S. Wallace; Dempsey (R)	Clarence; MacGregor (R)	James M. Mead (D)	Daniel A. Reed (R)	70th (1927–1929)
Robert L. Bacon (R)	John J. Kindred (D)	George W. Lindsay (D)	Thomas; H. Cullen (D)	Loring M. Black Jr. (D)	Andrew; Lawrence; Somers (D)	John; Quayle (D)	Patrick J. Carley (D)	David J. O'Connell (D)	Emanuel; Celler (D)	Anning; Smith; Prall (D)	Samuel; Dickstein (D)	Christopher; D. Sullivan (D)	William I. Sirovich (D)	John J. Boylan (D)	John J. O'Connor (D)	William W. Cohen (D)	John F. Carew (D)	Sol; Bloom (D)	Fiorello; La Guardia (R)	Royal; Hurlburt; Weller (D)	Anthony; J. Griffin (D)	Frank A. Oliver (D)	James M. Fitzpatrick (D)	J. Mayhew; Wainwright (R)	Hamilton; Fish III (R)	Harcourt; J. Pratt (R)	Parker; Corning (D)	James; S. Parker (R)	Frank; Crowther (R)	Bertrand; Snell (R)	Francis D. Culkin (R)	Frederick; M. Davenport (R)	John D. Clarke (R)	Clarence; E. Hancock (R)	John; Taber (R)	Gale H. Stalker (R)	Meyer; Jacobstein (D)	Archie; D. Sanders (R)	S. Wallace; Dempsey (R)	vacant	James M. Mead (D)	Daniel A. Reed (R)	70th (1927–1929)
Robert L. Bacon (R)	William; F. Brunner (D)	George W. Lindsay (D)	Thomas; H. Cullen (D)	Loring M. Black Jr. (D)	Andrew; Lawrence; Somers (D)	John; Quayle (D)	Patrick J. Carley (D)	David J. O'Connell (D)	Emanuel; Celler (D)	Anning; Smith; Prall (D)	Samuel; Dickstein (D)	Christopher; D. Sullivan (D)	William I. Sirovich (D)	John J. Boylan (D)	John J. O'Connor (D)	Ruth; Baker; Pratt (R)	John F. Carew (D)	Sol; Bloom (D)	Fiorello; La Guardia (R)	vacant	Anthony; J. Griffin (D)	Frank A. Oliver (D)	James M. Fitzpatrick (D)	J. Mayhew; Wainwright (R)	Hamilton; Fish III (R)	Harcourt; J. Pratt (R)	Parker; Corning (D)	James; S. Parker (R)	Frank; Crowther (R)	Bertrand; Snell (R)	Francis D. Culkin (R)	Frederick; M. Davenport (R)	John D. Clarke (R)	Clarence; E. Hancock (R)	John; Taber (R)	Gale H. Stalker (R)	James L. Whitley (R)	Archie; D. Sanders (R)	S. Wallace; Dempsey (R)	Edmund; F. Cooke (R)	James M. Mead (D)	Daniel A. Reed (R)	71st (1929–1931)
Robert L. Bacon (R)	William; F. Brunner (D)	George W. Lindsay (D)	Thomas; H. Cullen (D)	Loring M. Black Jr. (D)	Andrew; Lawrence; Somers (D)	vacant	Patrick J. Carley (D)	Stephen A. Rudd (D)	Emanuel; Celler (D)	Anning; Smith; Prall (D)	Samuel; Dickstein (D)	Christopher; D. Sullivan (D)	William I. Sirovich (D)	John J. Boylan (D)	John J. O'Connor (D)	Ruth; Baker; Pratt (R)	Martin J. Kennedy (D)	Sol; Bloom (D)	Fiorello; La Guardia (R)	Joseph A. Gavagan (D)	Anthony; J. Griffin (D)	Frank A. Oliver (D)	James M. Fitzpatrick (D)	J. Mayhew; Wainwright (R)	Hamilton; Fish III (R)	Harcourt; J. Pratt (R)	Parker; Corning (D)	James; S. Parker (R)	Frank; Crowther (R)	Bertrand; Snell (R)	Francis D. Culkin (R)	Frederick; M. Davenport (R)	John D. Clarke (R)	Clarence; E. Hancock (R)	John; Taber (R)	Gale H. Stalker (R)	James L. Whitley (R)	Archie; D. Sanders (R)	S. Wallace; Dempsey (R)	Edmund; F. Cooke (R)	James M. Mead (D)	Daniel A. Reed (R)	71st (1929–1931)
Robert L. Bacon (R)	William; F. Brunner (D)	George W. Lindsay (D)	Thomas; H. Cullen (D)	Loring M. Black Jr. (D)	Andrew; Lawrence; Somers (D)	John J. Delaney (D)	Patrick J. Carley (D)	Stephen A. Rudd (D)	Emanuel; Celler (D)	Anning; Smith; Prall (D)	Samuel; Dickstein (D)	Christopher; D. Sullivan (D)	William I. Sirovich (D)	John J. Boylan (D)	John J. O'Connor (D)	Ruth; Baker; Pratt (R)	Martin J. Kennedy (D)	Sol; Bloom (D)	Fiorello; La Guardia (R)	Joseph A. Gavagan (D)	Anthony; J. Griffin (D)	Frank A. Oliver (D)	James M. Fitzpatrick (D)	Charles D. Millard (R)	Hamilton; Fish III (R)	Harcourt; J. Pratt (R)	Parker; Corning (D)	James; S. Parker (R)	Frank; Crowther (R)	Bertrand; Snell (R)	Francis D. Culkin (R)	Frederick; M. Davenport (R)	John D. Clarke (R)	Clarence; E. Hancock (R)	John; Taber (R)	Gale H. Stalker (R)	James L. Whitley (R)	Archie; D. Sanders (R)	Walter G. Andrews (R)	Edmund; F. Cooke (R)	James M. Mead (D)	Daniel A. Reed (R)	72nd (1931–1933)

=== 1933–1953: 45 seats ===
During these two decades, New York had its maximum apportionment (to date) of 45 seats. From 1933 to 1945 there were 43 districts and two seats At-large. After 1945, there were 45 districts.

Congress
73rd
(1933–1935)
74th
(1935–1937)
75th
(1937–1939)
76th
(1939–1941)
77th
(1941–1943)
78th
(1943–1945)
79th
(1945–1947)
80th
(1947–1949)
81st
(1949–1951)
82nd
(1951–1953)

District										District										District										District										District			At-large (2 seats)		Congress
1st	2nd	3rd	4th	5th	6th	7th	8th	9th	10th	11th	12th	13th	14th	15th	16th	17th	18th	19th	20th	21st	22nd	23rd	24th	25th	26th	27th	28th	29th	30th	31st	32nd	33rd	34th	35th	36th	37th	38th	39th	40th	41st	42nd	43rd	Seat A	Seat B	Congress
Robert L. Bacon (R)	William; F. Brunner (D)	George; W. Lindsay (D)	Thomas H. Cullen (D)	Loring M. Black Jr. (D)	Andrew; Lawrence; Somers (D)	John J. Delaney (D)	Patrick J. Carley (D)	Stephen; A. Rudd (D)	Emanuel; Celler (D)	Anning; Smith; Prall (D)	Samuel; Dickstein (D)	Christopher; D. Sullivan (D)	William I. Sirovich (D)	John J. Boylan (D)	John J. O'Connor (D)	Theodore; A. Peyser (D)	Martin J. Kennedy (D)	Sol; Bloom (D)	James J. Lanzetta (D)	Joseph; A. Gavagan (D)	Anthony; J. Griffin (D)	Frank A. Oliver (D)	James M. Fitzpatrick (D)	Charles; D. Millard (R)	Hamilton; Fish III (R)	Philip A. Goodwin (R)	Parker; Corning (D)	James S. Parker (R)	Frank; Crowther (R)	Bertrand; Snell (R)	Francis D. Culkin (R)	Fred; Sisson (D)	John D. Clarke (R)	Clarence; E. Hancock (R)	John; Taber (R)	Gale H. Stalker (R)	James L. Whitley (R)	James W. Wadsworth; Jr. (R)	Walter G. Andrews (R)	Alfred F. Beiter (D)	James M. Mead (D)	Daniel A. Reed (R)	John; Fitz- gibbons (D)	Elmer E. Studley (D)	73rd (1933–1935)
Robert L. Bacon (R)	William; F. Brunner (D)	George; W. Lindsay (D)	Thomas H. Cullen (D)	Loring M. Black Jr. (D)	Andrew; Lawrence; Somers (D)	John J. Delaney (D)	Patrick J. Carley (D)	Stephen; A. Rudd (D)	Emanuel; Celler (D)	Anning; Smith; Prall (D)	Samuel; Dickstein (D)	Christopher; D. Sullivan (D)	William I. Sirovich (D)	John J. Boylan (D)	John J. O'Connor (D)	Theodore; A. Peyser (D)	Martin J. Kennedy (D)	Sol; Bloom (D)	James J. Lanzetta (D)	Joseph; A. Gavagan (D)	Anthony; J. Griffin (D)	vacant	James M. Fitzpatrick (D)	Charles; D. Millard (R)	Hamilton; Fish III (R)	Philip A. Goodwin (R)	Parker; Corning (D)	William D. Thomas (R)	Frank; Crowther (R)	Bertrand; Snell (R)	Francis D. Culkin (R)	Fred; Sisson (D)	Marian W. Clarke (R)	Clarence; E. Hancock (R)	John; Taber (R)	Gale H. Stalker (R)	James L. Whitley (R)	James W. Wadsworth; Jr. (R)	Walter G. Andrews (R)	Alfred F. Beiter (D)	James M. Mead (D)	Daniel A. Reed (R)	John; Fitz- gibbons (D)	Elmer E. Studley (D)	73rd (1933–1935)
Robert L. Bacon (R)	William; F. Brunner (D)	Joseph; L. Pfeifer (D)	Thomas H. Cullen (D)	Marcellus; H. Evans (D)	Andrew; Lawrence; Somers (D)	John J. Delaney (D)	Richard J. Tonry (D)	Stephen; A. Rudd (D)	Emanuel; Celler (D)	James A. O'Leary (D)	Samuel; Dickstein (D)	Christopher; D. Sullivan (D)	William I. Sirovich (D)	John J. Boylan (D)	John J. O'Connor (D)	Theodore; A. Peyser (D)	Martin J. Kennedy (D)	Sol; Bloom (D)	Vito; Marcantonio (R)	Joseph; A. Gavagan (D)	Anthony; J. Griffin (D)	Charles A. Buckley (D)	James M. Fitzpatrick (D)	Charles; D. Millard (R)	Hamilton; Fish III (R)	Philip A. Goodwin (R)	Parker; Corning (D)	William D. Thomas (R)	Frank; Crowther (R)	Bertrand; Snell (R)	Francis D. Culkin (R)	Fred; Sisson (D)	Bert; Lord (R)	Clarence; E. Hancock (R)	John; Taber (R)	W. Sterling; Cole (R)	James P. B. Duffy (D)	James W. Wadsworth; Jr. (R)	Walter G. Andrews (R)	Alfred F. Beiter (D)	James M. Mead (D)	Daniel A. Reed (R)	Matthew J. Merritt (D)	Caroline; Love; Goodwin; O'Day (D)	74th (1935–1937)
Robert L. Bacon (R)	William; Bernard; Barry (D)	Joseph; L. Pfeifer (D)	Thomas H. Cullen (D)	Marcellus; H. Evans (D)	Andrew; Lawrence; Somers (D)	John J. Delaney (D)	Richard J. Tonry (D)	vacant	Emanuel; Celler (D)	James A. O'Leary (D)	Samuel; Dickstein (D)	Christopher; D. Sullivan (D)	William I. Sirovich (D)	John J. Boylan (D)	John J. O'Connor (D)	Theodore; A. Peyser (D)	Martin J. Kennedy (D)	Sol; Bloom (D)	Vito; Marcantonio (R)	Joseph; A. Gavagan (D)	Edward; W. Curley (D)	Charles A. Buckley (D)	James M. Fitzpatrick (D)	Charles; D. Millard (R)	Hamilton; Fish III (R)	Philip A. Goodwin (R)	Parker; Corning (D)	vacant	Frank; Crowther (R)	Bertrand; Snell (R)	Francis D. Culkin (R)	Fred; Sisson (D)	Bert; Lord (R)	Clarence; E. Hancock (R)	John; Taber (R)	W. Sterling; Cole (R)	James P. B. Duffy (D)	James W. Wadsworth; Jr. (R)	Walter G. Andrews (R)	Alfred F. Beiter (D)	James M. Mead (D)	Daniel A. Reed (R)	Matthew J. Merritt (D)	Caroline; Love; Goodwin; O'Day (D)	74th (1935–1937)
Robert L. Bacon (R)	William; Bernard; Barry (D)	Joseph; L. Pfeifer (D)	Thomas H. Cullen (D)	Marcellus; H. Evans (D)	Andrew; Lawrence; Somers (D)	John J. Delaney (D)	Donald; Lawrence; O'Toole (D)	Eugene; Keogh (D)	Emanuel; Celler (D)	James A. O'Leary (D)	Samuel; Dickstein (D)	Christopher; D. Sullivan (D)	William I. Sirovich (D)	John J. Boylan (D)	John J. O'Connor (D)	Theodore; A. Peyser (D)	Martin J. Kennedy (D)	Sol; Bloom (D)	James J. Lanzetta (D)	Joseph; A. Gavagan (D)	Edward; W. Curley (D)	Charles A. Buckley (D)	James M. Fitzpatrick (D)	Charles; D. Millard (R)	Hamilton; Fish III (R)	Philip A. Goodwin (R)	William; T. Byrne (D)	E. Harold; Cluett (R)	Frank; Crowther (R)	Bertrand; Snell (R)	Francis D. Culkin (R)	Fred J. Douglas (R)	Bert; Lord (R)	Clarence; E. Hancock (R)	John; Taber (R)	W. Sterling; Cole (R)	George B. Kelly (D)	James W. Wadsworth; Jr. (R)	Walter G. Andrews (R)	Alfred F. Beiter (D)	James M. Mead (D)	Daniel A. Reed (R)	Matthew J. Merritt (D)	Caroline; Love; Goodwin; O'Day (D)	75th (1937–1939)
vacant	William; Bernard; Barry (D)	Joseph; L. Pfeifer (D)	Thomas H. Cullen (D)	Marcellus; H. Evans (D)	Andrew; Lawrence; Somers (D)	John J. Delaney (D)	Donald; Lawrence; O'Toole (D)	Eugene; Keogh (D)	Emanuel; Celler (D)	James A. O'Leary (D)	Samuel; Dickstein (D)	Christopher; D. Sullivan (D)	William I. Sirovich (D)	vacant	John J. O'Connor (D)	Bruce; Fairchild; Barton (R)	Martin J. Kennedy (D)	Sol; Bloom (D)	James J. Lanzetta (D)	Joseph; A. Gavagan (D)	Edward; W. Curley (D)	Charles A. Buckley (D)	James M. Fitzpatrick (D)	Ralph; A. Gamble (R)	Hamilton; Fish III (R)	Lewis K. Rockefeller (R)	William; T. Byrne (D)	E. Harold; Cluett (R)	Frank; Crowther (R)	Bertrand; Snell (R)	Francis D. Culkin (R)	Fred J. Douglas (R)	Bert; Lord (R)	Clarence; E. Hancock (R)	John; Taber (R)	W. Sterling; Cole (R)	George B. Kelly (D)	James W. Wadsworth; Jr. (R)	Walter G. Andrews (R)	Alfred F. Beiter (D)	vacant	Daniel A. Reed (R)	Matthew J. Merritt (D)	Caroline; Love; Goodwin; O'Day (D)	75th (1937–1939)
Leonard; Hall (R)	William; Bernard; Barry (D)	Joseph; L. Pfeifer (D)	Thomas H. Cullen (D)	Marcellus; H. Evans (D)	Andrew; Lawrence; Somers (D)	John J. Delaney (D)	Donald; Lawrence; O'Toole (D)	Eugene; Keogh (D)	Emanuel; Celler (D)	James A. O'Leary (D)	Samuel; Dickstein (D)	Christopher; D. Sullivan (D)	William I. Sirovich (D)	Michael J. Kennedy (D)	James H. Fay (D)	Bruce; Fairchild; Barton (R)	Martin J. Kennedy (D)	Sol; Bloom (D)	Vito; Marcantonio (AL)	Joseph; A. Gavagan (D)	Edward; W. Curley (D)	Charles A. Buckley (D)	James M. Fitzpatrick (D)	Ralph; A. Gamble (R)	Hamilton; Fish III (R)	Lewis K. Rockefeller (R)	William; T. Byrne (D)	E. Harold; Cluett (R)	Frank; Crowther (R)	Wallace E. Pierce (R)	Francis D. Culkin (R)	Fred J. Douglas (R)	Bert; Lord (R)	Clarence; E. Hancock (R)	John; Taber (R)	W. Sterling; Cole (R)	Joseph J. O'Brien (R)	James W. Wadsworth; Jr. (R)	Walter G. Andrews (R)	J. Francis; Harter (R)	Pius; Schwert (D)	Daniel A. Reed (R)	Matthew J. Merritt (D)	Caroline; Love; Goodwin; O'Day (D)	76th (1939–1941)
Leonard; Hall (R)	William; Bernard; Barry (D)	Joseph; L. Pfeifer (D)	Thomas H. Cullen (D)	Marcellus; H. Evans (D)	Andrew; Lawrence; Somers (D)	John J. Delaney (D)	Donald; Lawrence; O'Toole (D)	Eugene; Keogh (D)	Emanuel; Celler (D)	James A. O'Leary (D)	Samuel; Dickstein (D)	Christopher; D. Sullivan (D)	Morris; Michael; Edelstein (D)	Michael J. Kennedy (D)	James H. Fay (D)	Bruce; Fairchild; Barton (R)	Martin J. Kennedy (D)	Sol; Bloom (D)	Vito; Marcantonio (AL)	Joseph; A. Gavagan (D)	Walter; A. Lynch (D)	Charles A. Buckley (D)	James M. Fitzpatrick (D)	Ralph; A. Gamble (R)	Hamilton; Fish III (R)	Lewis K. Rockefeller (R)	William; T. Byrne (D)	E. Harold; Cluett (R)	Frank; Crowther (R)	Clarence; E. Kilburn (R)	Francis D. Culkin (R)	Fred J. Douglas (R)	Edwin; Arthur; Hall (R)	Clarence; E. Hancock (R)	John; Taber (R)	W. Sterling; Cole (R)	Joseph J. O'Brien (R)	James W. Wadsworth; Jr. (R)	Walter G. Andrews (R)	J. Francis; Harter (R)	Pius; Schwert (D)	Daniel A. Reed (R)	Matthew J. Merritt (D)	Caroline; Love; Goodwin; O'Day (D)	76th (1939–1941)
Leonard; Hall (R)	William; Bernard; Barry (D)	Joseph; L. Pfeifer (D)	Thomas H. Cullen (D)	James J. Heffernan (D)	Andrew; Lawrence; Somers (D)	John J. Delaney (D)	Donald; Lawrence; O'Toole (D)	Eugene; Keogh (D)	Emanuel; Celler (D)	James A. O'Leary (D)	Samuel; Dickstein (D)	Louis; Capozzoli (D)	Morris; Michael; Edelstein (D)	Michael J. Kennedy (D)	William T. Pheiffer (R)	Kenneth F. Simpson (R)	Martin J. Kennedy (D)	Sol; Bloom (D)	Vito; Marcantonio (AL)	Joseph; A. Gavagan (D)	Walter; A. Lynch (D)	Charles A. Buckley (D)	James M. Fitzpatrick (D)	Ralph; A. Gamble (R)	Hamilton; Fish III (R)	Lewis K. Rockefeller (R)	William; T. Byrne (D)	E. Harold; Cluett (R)	Frank; Crowther (R)	Clarence; E. Kilburn (R)	Francis D. Culkin (R)	Fred J. Douglas (R)	Edwin; Arthur; Hall (R)	Clarence; E. Hancock (R)	John; Taber (R)	W. Sterling; Cole (R)	Joseph J. O'Brien (R)	James W. Wadsworth; Jr. (R)	Walter G. Andrews (R)	Alfred F. Beiter (D)	Pius; Schwert (D)	Daniel A. Reed (R)	Matthew J. Merritt (D)	Caroline; Love; Goodwin; O'Day (D)	77th (1941–1943)
Leonard; Hall (R)	William; Bernard; Barry (D)	Joseph; L. Pfeifer (D)	Thomas H. Cullen (D)	James J. Heffernan (D)	Andrew; Lawrence; Somers (D)	John J. Delaney (D)	Donald; Lawrence; O'Toole (D)	Eugene; Keogh (D)	Emanuel; Celler (D)	James A. O'Leary (D)	Samuel; Dickstein (D)	Louis; Capozzoli (D)	Arthur G. Klein (D)	Michael J. Kennedy (D)	William T. Pheiffer (R)	Joseph C. Baldwin (R)	Martin J. Kennedy (D)	Sol; Bloom (D)	Vito; Marcantonio (AL)	Joseph; A. Gavagan (D)	Walter; A. Lynch (D)	Charles A. Buckley (D)	James M. Fitzpatrick (D)	Ralph; A. Gamble (R)	Hamilton; Fish III (R)	Lewis K. Rockefeller (R)	William; T. Byrne (D)	E. Harold; Cluett (R)	Frank; Crowther (R)	Clarence; E. Kilburn (R)	Francis D. Culkin (R)	Fred J. Douglas (R)	Edwin; Arthur; Hall (R)	Clarence; E. Hancock (R)	John; Taber (R)	W. Sterling; Cole (R)	Joseph J. O'Brien (R)	James W. Wadsworth; Jr. (R)	Walter G. Andrews (R)	Alfred F. Beiter (D)	John; Cornelius; Butler (R)	Daniel A. Reed (R)	Matthew J. Merritt (D)	Caroline; Love; Goodwin; O'Day (D)	77th (1941–1943)
Leonard; Hall (R)	William; Bernard; Barry (D)	Joseph; L. Pfeifer (D)	Thomas H. Cullen (D)	James J. Heffernan (D)	Andrew; Lawrence; Somers (D)	John J. Delaney (D)	Donald; Lawrence; O'Toole (D)	Eugene; Keogh (D)	Emanuel; Celler (D)	James A. O'Leary (D)	Samuel; Dickstein (D)	Louis; Capozzoli (D)	Arthur G. Klein (D)	Thomas F. Burchill (D)	James H. Fay (D)	Joseph C. Baldwin (R)	Martin J. Kennedy (D)	Sol; Bloom (D)	Vito; Marcantonio (AL)	Joseph; A. Gavagan (D)	Walter; A. Lynch (D)	Charles A. Buckley (D)	James M. Fitzpatrick (D)	Ralph; A. Gamble (R)	Hamilton; Fish III (R)	Jay Le; Fevre (R)	William; T. Byrne (D)	Dean P. Taylor (R)	Bernard W. Kearney (R)	Clarence; E. Kilburn (R)	Francis D. Culkin (R)	Fred J. Douglas (R)	Edwin; Arthur; Hall (R)	Clarence; E. Hancock (R)	John; Taber (R)	W. Sterling; Cole (R)	Joseph J. O'Brien (R)	James W. Wadsworth; Jr. (R)	Walter G. Andrews (R)	Joseph; Mruk (R)	John; Cornelius; Butler (R)	Daniel A. Reed (R)	Matthew J. Merritt (D)	Winifred C. Stanley (R)	78th (1943–1945)
Leonard; Hall (R)	William; Bernard; Barry (D)	Joseph; L. Pfeifer (D)	John J. Rooney (D)	James J. Heffernan (D)	Andrew; Lawrence; Somers (D)	John J. Delaney (D)	Donald; Lawrence; O'Toole (D)	Eugene; Keogh (D)	Emanuel; Celler (D)	Ellsworth; B. Buck (R)	Samuel; Dickstein (D)	Louis; Capozzoli (D)	Arthur G. Klein (D)	Thomas F. Burchill (D)	James H. Fay (D)	Joseph C. Baldwin (R)	Martin J. Kennedy (D)	Sol; Bloom (D)	Vito; Marcantonio (AL)	James; H. Torrens (D)	Walter; A. Lynch (D)	Charles A. Buckley (D)	James M. Fitzpatrick (D)	Ralph; A. Gamble (R)	Hamilton; Fish III (R)	Jay Le; Fevre (R)	William; T. Byrne (D)	Dean P. Taylor (R)	Bernard W. Kearney (R)	Clarence; E. Kilburn (R)	Hadwen C. Fuller (R)	Fred J. Douglas (R)	Edwin; Arthur; Hall (R)	Clarence; E. Hancock (R)	John; Taber (R)	W. Sterling; Cole (R)	Joseph J. O'Brien (R)	James W. Wadsworth; Jr. (R)	Walter G. Andrews (R)	Joseph; Mruk (R)	John; Cornelius; Butler (R)	Daniel A. Reed (R)	Matthew J. Merritt (D)	Winifred C. Stanley (R)	78th (1943–1945)
Edgar A. Sharp (R)	Leonard; Hall (R)	Henry J. Latham (R)	William B. Barry (D)	James A. Roe (D)	James J. Delaney (D)	John J. Delaney (D)	Joseph L. Pfeifer (D)	Eugene; Keogh (D)	Andrew; Lawrence; Somers (D)	James J. Heffernan (D)	John J. Rooney (D)	Donald; Lawrence; O'Toole (D)	Leo F. Rayfiel (D)	Emanuel; Celler (D)	Ellsworth; B. Buck (R)	Joseph C. Baldwin (R)	Vito; Marc- antonio (AL)	Samuel; Dickstein (D)	Sol; Bloom (D)	James; H. Torrens (D)	Adam; Clayton; Powell; Jr. (D)	Walter A. Lynch (D)	Benjamin; J. Rabin (D)	Charles; A. Buckley (D)	Peter A. Quinn (D)	Ralph W. Gwinn (R)	Ralph; A. Gamble (R)	Augustus; W. Bennet (R)	Jay Le; Fevre (R)	Bernard; W. Kearney (R)	William T. Byrne (D)	Dean P. Taylor (R)	Clarence; E. Kilburn (R)	Hadwen; C. Fuller (R)	Clarence E. Hancock (R)	Edwin; Arthur; Hall (R)	John; Taber (R)	W. Sterling; Cole (R)	George F. Rogers (D)	James W. Wadsworth; Jr. (R)	Walter G. Andrews (R)	Edward J. Elsaesser (R)	44th district	45th district	79th (1945–1947)
Edgar A. Sharp (R)	Leonard; Hall (R)	Henry J. Latham (R)	William B. Barry (D)	James A. Roe (D)	James J. Delaney (D)	John J. Delaney (D)	Joseph L. Pfeifer (D)	Eugene; Keogh (D)	Andrew; Lawrence; Somers (D)	James J. Heffernan (D)	John J. Rooney (D)	Donald; Lawrence; O'Toole (D)	Leo F. Rayfiel (D)	Emanuel; Celler (D)	Ellsworth; B. Buck (R)	Joseph C. Baldwin (R)	Vito; Marc- antonio (AL)	Samuel; Dickstein (D)	Sol; Bloom (D)	James; H. Torrens (D)	Adam; Clayton; Powell; Jr. (D)	Walter A. Lynch (D)	Benjamin; J. Rabin (D)	Charles; A. Buckley (D)	Peter A. Quinn (D)	Ralph W. Gwinn (R)	Ralph; A. Gamble (R)	Augustus; W. Bennet (R)	Jay Le; Fevre (R)	Bernard; W. Kearney (R)	William T. Byrne (D)	Dean P. Taylor (R)	Clarence; E. Kilburn (R)	Hadwen; C. Fuller (R)	Clarence E. Hancock (R)	Edwin; Arthur; Hall (R)	John; Taber (R)	W. Sterling; Cole (R)	George F. Rogers (D)	James W. Wadsworth; Jr. (R)	Walter G. Andrews (R)	Edward J. Elsaesser (R)	John; Cornelius; Butler (R)	Daniel A. Reed (R)	79th (1945–1947)
Edgar A. Sharp (R)	Leonard; Hall (R)	Henry J. Latham (R)	vacant	James A. Roe (D)	James J. Delaney (D)	John J. Delaney (D)	Joseph L. Pfeifer (D)	Eugene; Keogh (D)	Andrew; Lawrence; Somers (D)	James J. Heffernan (D)	John J. Rooney (D)	Donald; Lawrence; O'Toole (D)	Leo F. Rayfiel (D)	Emanuel; Celler (D)	Ellsworth; B. Buck (R)	Joseph C. Baldwin (R)	Vito; Marc- antonio (AL)	Arthur G. Klein (D)	Sol; Bloom (D)	James; H. Torrens (D)	Adam; Clayton; Powell; Jr. (D)	Walter A. Lynch (D)	Benjamin; J. Rabin (D)	Charles; A. Buckley (D)	Peter A. Quinn (D)	Ralph W. Gwinn (R)	Ralph; A. Gamble (R)	Augustus; W. Bennet (R)	Jay Le; Fevre (R)	Bernard; W. Kearney (R)	William T. Byrne (D)	Dean P. Taylor (R)	Clarence; E. Kilburn (R)	Hadwen; C. Fuller (R)	Clarence E. Hancock (R)	Edwin; Arthur; Hall (R)	John; Taber (R)	W. Sterling; Cole (R)	George F. Rogers (D)	James W. Wadsworth; Jr. (R)	Walter G. Andrews (R)	Edward J. Elsaesser (R)	John; Cornelius; Butler (R)	Daniel A. Reed (R)	79th (1945–1947)
W. Kingsland; Macy (R)	Leonard; Hall (R)	Henry J. Latham (R)	Gregory; McMahon (R)	Robert Tripp; Ross (R)	Robert; Nodar; Jr. (R)	John J. Delaney (D)	Joseph L. Pfeifer (D)	Eugene; Keogh (D)	Andrew; Lawrence; Somers (D)	James J. Heffernan (D)	John J. Rooney (D)	Donald; Lawrence; O'Toole (D)	Leo F. Rayfiel (D)	Emanuel; Celler (D)	Ellsworth; B. Buck (R)	Frederic; Coudert; Jr. (R)	Vito; Marc- antonio (AL)	Arthur G. Klein (D)	Sol; Bloom (D)	Jacob; Javits (R)	Adam; Clayton; Powell; Jr. (D)	Walter A. Lynch (D)	Benjamin; J. Rabin (D)	Charles; A. Buckley (D)	David M. Potts (R)	Ralph W. Gwinn (R)	Ralph; A. Gamble (R)	Katharine; St. George (R)	Jay Le; Fevre (R)	Bernard; W. Kearney (R)	William T. Byrne (D)	Dean P. Taylor (R)	Clarence; E. Kilburn (R)	Hadwen; C. Fuller (R)	R. Walter; Riehlman (R)	Edwin; Arthur; Hall (R)	John; Taber (R)	W. Sterling; Cole (R)	Kenneth; Keating (R)	James W. Wadsworth; Jr. (R)	Walter G. Andrews (R)	Edward J. Elsaesser (R)	John; Cornelius; Butler (R)	Daniel A. Reed (R)	80th (1947–1949)
W. Kingsland; Macy (R)	Leonard; Hall (R)	Henry J. Latham (R)	Gregory; McMahon (R)	Robert Tripp; Ross (R)	Robert; Nodar; Jr. (R)	vacant	Joseph L. Pfeifer (D)	Eugene; Keogh (D)	Andrew; Lawrence; Somers (D)	James J. Heffernan (D)	John J. Rooney (D)	Donald; Lawrence; O'Toole (D)	Abraham J. Multer (D)	Emanuel; Celler (D)	Ellsworth; B. Buck (R)	Frederic; Coudert; Jr. (R)	Vito; Marc- antonio (AL)	Arthur G. Klein (D)	Sol; Bloom (D)	Jacob; Javits (R)	Adam; Clayton; Powell; Jr. (D)	Walter A. Lynch (D)	Leo; Isacson (AL)	Charles; A. Buckley (D)	David M. Potts (R)	Ralph W. Gwinn (R)	Ralph; A. Gamble (R)	Katharine; St. George (R)	Jay Le; Fevre (R)	Bernard; W. Kearney (R)	William T. Byrne (D)	Dean P. Taylor (R)	Clarence; E. Kilburn (R)	Hadwen; C. Fuller (R)	R. Walter; Riehlman (R)	Edwin; Arthur; Hall (R)	John; Taber (R)	W. Sterling; Cole (R)	Kenneth; Keating (R)	James W. Wadsworth; Jr. (R)	Walter G. Andrews (R)	Edward J. Elsaesser (R)	John; Cornelius; Butler (R)	Daniel A. Reed (R)	80th (1947–1949)
W. Kingsland; Macy (R)	Leonard; Hall (R)	Henry J. Latham (R)	L. Gary; Clemente (D)	T. Vincent; Quinn (D)	James J. Delaney (D)	vacant	Joseph L. Pfeifer (D)	Eugene; Keogh (D)	Andrew; Lawrence; Somers (D)	James J. Heffernan (D)	John J. Rooney (D)	Donald; Lawrence; O'Toole (D)	Abraham J. Multer (D)	Emanuel; Celler (D)	James J. Murphy (D)	Frederic; Coudert; Jr. (R)	Vito; Marc- antonio (AL)	Arthur G. Klein (D)	Sol; Bloom (D)	Jacob; Javits (R)	Adam; Clayton; Powell; Jr. (D)	Walter A. Lynch (D)	Isidore; Dollinger (D)	Charles; A. Buckley (D)	Christopher; C. McGrath (D)	Ralph W. Gwinn (R)	Ralph; A. Gamble (R)	Katharine; St. George (R)	Jay Le; Fevre (R)	Bernard; W. Kearney (R)	William T. Byrne (D)	Dean P. Taylor (R)	Clarence; E. Kilburn (R)	John C. Davies II (D)	R. Walter; Riehlman (R)	Edwin; Arthur; Hall (R)	John; Taber (R)	W. Sterling; Cole (R)	Kenneth; Keating (R)	James W. Wadsworth; Jr. (R)	William L. Pfeiffer (R)	Anthony F. Tauriello (D)	Chester C. Gorski (D)	Daniel A. Reed (R)	81st (1949–1951)
W. Kingsland; Macy (R)	Leonard; Hall (R)	Henry J. Latham (R)	L. Gary; Clemente (D)	T. Vincent; Quinn (D)	James J. Delaney (D)	Louis B. Heller (D)	Joseph L. Pfeifer (D)	Eugene; Keogh (D)	Edna F. Kelly (D)	James J. Heffernan (D)	John J. Rooney (D)	Donald; Lawrence; O'Toole (D)	Abraham J. Multer (D)	Emanuel; Celler (D)	James J. Murphy (D)	Frederic; Coudert; Jr. (R)	Vito; Marc- antonio (AL)	Arthur G. Klein (D)	Franklin D. Roosevelt Jr. (Lib)	Jacob; Javits (R)	Adam; Clayton; Powell; Jr. (D)	Walter A. Lynch (D)	Isidore; Dollinger (D)	Charles; A. Buckley (D)	Christopher; C. McGrath (D)	Ralph W. Gwinn (R)	Ralph; A. Gamble (R)	Katharine; St. George (R)	Jay Le; Fevre (R)	Bernard; W. Kearney (R)	William T. Byrne (D)	Dean P. Taylor (R)	Clarence; E. Kilburn (R)	John C. Davies II (D)	R. Walter; Riehlman (R)	Edwin; Arthur; Hall (R)	John; Taber (R)	W. Sterling; Cole (R)	Kenneth; Keating (R)	James W. Wadsworth; Jr. (R)	William L. Pfeiffer (R)	Anthony F. Tauriello (D)	Chester C. Gorski (D)	Daniel A. Reed (R)	81st (1949–1951)
Ernest; Greenwood (D)	Leonard; Hall (R)	Henry J. Latham (R)	L. Gary; Clemente (D)	T. Vincent; Quinn (D)	James J. Delaney (D)	Louis B. Heller (D)	Victor; Anfuso (D)	Eugene; Keogh (D)	Edna F. Kelly (D)	James J. Heffernan (D)	John J. Rooney (D)	Donald; Lawrence; O'Toole (D)	Abraham J. Multer (D)	Emanuel; Celler (D)	James J. Murphy (D)	Frederic; Coudert; Jr. (R)	James G. Donovan (D)	Arthur G. Klein (D)	Franklin D. Roosevelt Jr. (D)	Jacob; Javits (R)	Adam; Clayton; Powell; Jr. (D)	Sidney; A. Fine (D)	Isidore; Dollinger (D)	Charles; A. Buckley (D)	Christopher; C. McGrath (D)	Ralph W. Gwinn (R)	Ralph; A. Gamble (R)	Katharine; St. George (R)	J. Ernest; Wharton (R)	Bernard; W. Kearney (R)	William T. Byrne (D)	Dean P. Taylor (R)	Clarence; E. Kilburn (R)	William R. Williams (R)	R. Walter; Riehlman (R)	Edwin; Arthur; Hall (R)	John; Taber (R)	W. Sterling; Cole (R)	Kenneth; Keating (R)	Harold C. Ostertag (R)	William E. Miller (R)	Edmund P. Radwan (R)	John; Cornelius; Butler (R)	Daniel A. Reed (R)	82nd (1951–1953)
Ernest; Greenwood (D)	vacant	Henry J. Latham (R)	L. Gary; Clemente (D)	Robert Tripp; Ross (R)	James J. Delaney (D)	Louis B. Heller (D)	Victor; Anfuso (D)	Eugene; Keogh (D)	Edna F. Kelly (D)	James J. Heffernan (D)	John J. Rooney (D)	Donald; Lawrence; O'Toole (D)	Abraham J. Multer (D)	Emanuel; Celler (D)	James J. Murphy (D)	Frederic; Coudert; Jr. (R)	James G. Donovan (D)	Arthur G. Klein (D)	Franklin D. Roosevelt Jr. (D)	Jacob; Javits (R)	Adam; Clayton; Powell; Jr. (D)	Sidney; A. Fine (D)	Isidore; Dollinger (D)	Charles; A. Buckley (D)	Christopher; C. McGrath (D)	Ralph W. Gwinn (R)	Ralph; A. Gamble (R)	Katharine; St. George (R)	J. Ernest; Wharton (R)	Bernard; W. Kearney (R)	Leo W. O'Brien (D)	Dean P. Taylor (R)	Clarence; E. Kilburn (R)	William R. Williams (R)	R. Walter; Riehlman (R)	Edwin; Arthur; Hall (R)	John; Taber (R)	W. Sterling; Cole (R)	Kenneth; Keating (R)	Harold C. Ostertag (R)	William E. Miller (R)	Edmund P. Radwan (R)	John; Cornelius; Butler (R)	Daniel A. Reed (R)	82nd (1951–1953)

=== 1953–1963: 43 seats ===
New York lost two seats following the 1950 census. It continued to lose seats from this point forward following every reapportionment.

Congress
83rd
(1953–1955)
84th
(1955–1957)
85th
(1957–1959)
86th
(1959–1961)
87th
(1961–1963)

District										District										District										District										District			Congress
1st	2nd	3rd	4th	5th	6th	7th	8th	9th	10th	11th	12th	13th	14th	15th	16th	17th	18th	19th	20th	21st	22nd	23rd	24th	25th	26th	27th	28th	29th	30th	31st	32nd	33rd	34th	35th	36th	37th	38th	39th	40th	41st	42nd	43rd	Congress
Stuyvesant; Wainwright (R)	Steven; Derounian (R)	Frank; J. Becker (R)	Henry J. Latham (R)	Albert H. Bosch (R)	Lester; Holtzman (D)	James; J. Delaney (D)	Louis B. Heller (D)	Eugene; Keogh (D)	Edna; F. Kelly (D)	Emanuel; Celler (D)	Francis; E. Dorn (R)	Abraham; J. Multer (D)	John; J. Rooney (D)	John; H. Ray (R)	Adam; Clayton; Powell; Jr. (D)	Frederic; Coudert; Jr. (R)	James G. Donovan (D)	Arthur; G. Klein (D)	Franklin D. Roosevelt; Jr. (D)	Jacob; Javits (R)	Sidney; A. Fine (D)	Isidore; Dollinger (D)	Charles; A. Buckley (D)	Paul; A. Fino (R)	Ralph; A. Gamble (R)	Ralph; W. Gwinn (R)	Katharine; St. George (R)	J. Ernest; Wharton (R)	Leo W. O'Brien (D)	Dean P. Taylor (R)	Bernard; W. Kearney (R)	Clarence; E. Kilburn (R)	William; R. Williams (R)	R. Walter; Riehlman (R)	John; Taber (R)	W. Sterling; Cole (R)	Kenneth; Keating (R)	Harold; C. Ostertag (R)	William; E. Miller (R)	Edmund; P. Radwan (R)	John; R. Pillion (R)	Daniel; A. Reed (R)	83rd (1953–1955)
Stuyvesant; Wainwright (R)	Steven; Derounian (R)	Frank; J. Becker (R)	Henry J. Latham (R)	Albert H. Bosch (R)	Lester; Holtzman (D)	James; J. Delaney (D)	vacant	Eugene; Keogh (D)	Edna; F. Kelly (D)	Emanuel; Celler (D)	Francis; E. Dorn (R)	Abraham; J. Multer (D)	John; J. Rooney (D)	John; H. Ray (R)	Adam; Clayton; Powell; Jr. (D)	Frederic; Coudert; Jr. (R)	James G. Donovan (D)	Arthur; G. Klein (D)	Franklin D. Roosevelt; Jr. (D)	vacant	Sidney; A. Fine (D)	Isidore; Dollinger (D)	Charles; A. Buckley (D)	Paul; A. Fino (R)	Ralph; A. Gamble (R)	Ralph; W. Gwinn (R)	Katharine; St. George (R)	J. Ernest; Wharton (R)	Leo W. O'Brien (D)	Dean P. Taylor (R)	Bernard; W. Kearney (R)	Clarence; E. Kilburn (R)	William; R. Williams (R)	R. Walter; Riehlman (R)	John; Taber (R)	W. Sterling; Cole (R)	Kenneth; Keating (R)	Harold; C. Ostertag (R)	William; E. Miller (R)	Edmund; P. Radwan (R)	John; R. Pillion (R)	Daniel; A. Reed (R)	83rd (1953–1955)
Stuyvesant; Wainwright (R)	Steven; Derounian (R)	Frank; J. Becker (R)	Henry J. Latham (R)	Albert H. Bosch (R)	Lester; Holtzman (D)	James; J. Delaney (D)	Victor; Anfuso (D)	Eugene; Keogh (D)	Edna; F. Kelly (D)	Emanuel; Celler (D)	Francis; E. Dorn (R)	Abraham; J. Multer (D)	John; J. Rooney (D)	John; H. Ray (R)	Adam; Clayton; Powell; Jr. (D)	Frederic; Coudert; Jr. (R)	James G. Donovan (D)	Arthur; G. Klein (D)	Irwin D. Davidson (Lib)	Herbert; Zelenko (D)	Sidney; A. Fine (D)	Isidore; Dollinger (D)	Charles; A. Buckley (D)	Paul; A. Fino (R)	Ralph; A. Gamble (R)	Ralph; W. Gwinn (R)	Katharine; St. George (R)	J. Ernest; Wharton (R)	Leo W. O'Brien (D)	Dean P. Taylor (R)	Bernard; W. Kearney (R)	Clarence; E. Kilburn (R)	William; R. Williams (R)	R. Walter; Riehlman (R)	John; Taber (R)	W. Sterling; Cole (R)	Kenneth; Keating (R)	Harold; C. Ostertag (R)	William; E. Miller (R)	Edmund; P. Radwan (R)	John; R. Pillion (R)	Daniel; A. Reed (R)	84th (1955–1957)
Stuyvesant; Wainwright (R)	Steven; Derounian (R)	Frank; J. Becker (R)	Henry J. Latham (R)	Albert H. Bosch (R)	Lester; Holtzman (D)	James; J. Delaney (D)	Victor; Anfuso (D)	Eugene; Keogh (D)	Edna; F. Kelly (D)	Emanuel; Celler (D)	Francis; E. Dorn (R)	Abraham; J. Multer (D)	John; J. Rooney (D)	John; H. Ray (R)	Adam; Clayton; Powell; Jr. (D)	Frederic; Coudert; Jr. (R)	James G. Donovan (D)	vacant	vacant	Herbert; Zelenko (D)	James; C. Healey (D)	Isidore; Dollinger (D)	Charles; A. Buckley (D)	Paul; A. Fino (R)	Ralph; A. Gamble (R)	Ralph; W. Gwinn (R)	Katharine; St. George (R)	J. Ernest; Wharton (R)	Leo W. O'Brien (D)	Dean P. Taylor (R)	Bernard; W. Kearney (R)	Clarence; E. Kilburn (R)	William; R. Williams (R)	R. Walter; Riehlman (R)	John; Taber (R)	W. Sterling; Cole (R)	Kenneth; Keating (R)	Harold; C. Ostertag (R)	William; E. Miller (R)	Edmund; P. Radwan (R)	John; R. Pillion (R)	Daniel; A. Reed (R)	84th (1955–1957)
Stuyvesant; Wainwright (R)	Steven; Derounian (R)	Frank; J. Becker (R)	Henry J. Latham (R)	Albert H. Bosch (R)	Lester; Holtzman (D)	James; J. Delaney (D)	Victor; Anfuso (D)	Eugene; Keogh (D)	Edna; F. Kelly (D)	Emanuel; Celler (D)	Francis; E. Dorn (R)	Abraham; J. Multer (D)	John; J. Rooney (D)	John; H. Ray (R)	Adam; Clayton; Powell; Jr. (D)	Frederic; Coudert; Jr. (R)	Alfred E. Santangelo (D)	Leonard; Farbstein (D)	Ludwig; Teller (D)	Herbert; Zelenko (D)	James; C. Healey (D)	Isidore; Dollinger (D)	Charles; A. Buckley (D)	Paul; A. Fino (R)	Edwin; B. Dooley (R)	Ralph; W. Gwinn (R)	Katharine; St. George (R)	J. Ernest; Wharton (R)	Leo W. O'Brien (D)	Dean P. Taylor (R)	Bernard; W. Kearney (R)	Clarence; E. Kilburn (R)	William; R. Williams (R)	R. Walter; Riehlman (R)	John; Taber (R)	W. Sterling; Cole (R)	Kenneth; Keating (R)	Harold; C. Ostertag (R)	William; E. Miller (R)	Edmund; P. Radwan (R)	John; R. Pillion (R)	Daniel; A. Reed (R)	85th (1957–1959)
Stuyvesant; Wainwright (R)	Steven; Derounian (R)	Frank; J. Becker (R)	vacant	Albert H. Bosch (R)	Lester; Holtzman (D)	James; J. Delaney (D)	Victor; Anfuso (D)	Eugene; Keogh (D)	Edna; F. Kelly (D)	Emanuel; Celler (D)	Francis; E. Dorn (R)	Abraham; J. Multer (D)	John; J. Rooney (D)	John; H. Ray (R)	Adam; Clayton; Powell; Jr. (D)	Frederic; Coudert; Jr. (R)	Alfred E. Santangelo (D)	Leonard; Farbstein (D)	Ludwig; Teller (D)	Herbert; Zelenko (D)	James; C. Healey (D)	Isidore; Dollinger (D)	Charles; A. Buckley (D)	Paul; A. Fino (R)	Edwin; B. Dooley (R)	Ralph; W. Gwinn (R)	Katharine; St. George (R)	J. Ernest; Wharton (R)	Leo W. O'Brien (D)	Dean P. Taylor (R)	Bernard; W. Kearney (R)	Clarence; E. Kilburn (R)	William; R. Williams (R)	R. Walter; Riehlman (R)	John; Taber (R)	Howard; W. Robison (R)	Kenneth; Keating (R)	Harold; C. Ostertag (R)	William; E. Miller (R)	Edmund; P. Radwan (R)	John; R. Pillion (R)	Daniel; A. Reed (R)	85th (1957–1959)
Stuyvesant; Wainwright (R)	Steven; Derounian (R)	Frank; J. Becker (R)	Seymour; Halpern (R)	Albert H. Bosch (R)	Lester; Holtzman (D)	James; J. Delaney (D)	Victor; Anfuso (D)	Eugene; Keogh (D)	Edna; F. Kelly (D)	Emanuel; Celler (D)	Francis; E. Dorn (R)	Abraham; J. Multer (D)	John; J. Rooney (D)	John; H. Ray (R)	Adam; Clayton; Powell; Jr. (D)	John; Lindsay (R)	Alfred E. Santangelo (D)	Leonard; Farbstein (D)	Ludwig; Teller (D)	Herbert; Zelenko (D)	James; C. Healey (D)	Isidore; Dollinger (D)	Charles; A. Buckley (D)	Paul; A. Fino (R)	Edwin; B. Dooley (R)	Robert; R. Barry (R)	Katharine; St. George (R)	J. Ernest; Wharton (R)	Leo W. O'Brien (D)	Dean P. Taylor (R)	Samuel; S. Stratton (D)	Clarence; E. Kilburn (R)	Alexander; Pirnie (R)	R. Walter; Riehlman (R)	John; Taber (R)	Howard; W. Robison (R)	Jessica; M. Weis (R)	Harold; C. Ostertag (R)	William; E. Miller (R)	Thaddeus; J. Dulski (D)	John; R. Pillion (R)	Daniel; A. Reed (R)	86th (1959–1961)
Stuyvesant; Wainwright (R)	Steven; Derounian (R)	Frank; J. Becker (R)	Seymour; Halpern (R)	vacant	Lester; Holtzman (D)	James; J. Delaney (D)	Victor; Anfuso (D)	Eugene; Keogh (D)	Edna; F. Kelly (D)	Emanuel; Celler (D)	Francis; E. Dorn (R)	Abraham; J. Multer (D)	John; J. Rooney (D)	John; H. Ray (R)	Adam; Clayton; Powell; Jr. (D)	John; Lindsay (R)	Alfred E. Santangelo (D)	Leonard; Farbstein (D)	Ludwig; Teller (D)	Herbert; Zelenko (D)	James; C. Healey (D)	Jacob H. Gilbert (D)	Charles; A. Buckley (D)	Paul; A. Fino (R)	Edwin; B. Dooley (R)	Robert; R. Barry (R)	Katharine; St. George (R)	J. Ernest; Wharton (R)	Leo W. O'Brien (D)	Dean P. Taylor (R)	Samuel; S. Stratton (D)	Clarence; E. Kilburn (R)	Alexander; Pirnie (R)	R. Walter; Riehlman (R)	John; Taber (R)	Howard; W. Robison (R)	Jessica; M. Weis (R)	Harold; C. Ostertag (R)	William; E. Miller (R)	Thaddeus; J. Dulski (D)	John; R. Pillion (R)	Charles; Goodell (R)	86th (1959–1961)
Otis G. Pike (D)	Steven; Derounian (R)	Frank; J. Becker (R)	Seymour; Halpern (R)	Joseph P. Addabbo (D)	Lester; Holtzman (D)	James; J. Delaney (D)	Victor; Anfuso (D)	Eugene; Keogh (D)	Edna; F. Kelly (D)	Emanuel; Celler (D)	Hugh; Carey (D)	Abraham; J. Multer (D)	John; J. Rooney (D)	John; H. Ray (R)	Adam; Clayton; Powell; Jr. (D)	John; Lindsay (R)	Alfred E. Santangelo (D)	Leonard; Farbstein (D)	William Fitts; Ryan (D)	Herbert; Zelenko (D)	James; C. Healey (D)	Jacob H. Gilbert (D)	Charles; A. Buckley (D)	Paul; A. Fino (R)	Edwin; B. Dooley (R)	Robert; R. Barry (R)	Katharine; St. George (R)	J. Ernest; Wharton (R)	Leo W. O'Brien (D)	Carleton; J. King (R)	Samuel; S. Stratton (D)	Clarence; E. Kilburn (R)	Alexander; Pirnie (R)	R. Walter; Riehlman (R)	John; Taber (R)	Howard; W. Robison (R)	Jessica; M. Weis (R)	Harold; C. Ostertag (R)	William; E. Miller (R)	Thaddeus; J. Dulski (D)	John; R. Pillion (R)	Charles; Goodell (R)	87th (1961–1963)
Otis G. Pike (D)	Steven; Derounian (R)	Frank; J. Becker (R)	Seymour; Halpern (R)	Joseph P. Addabbo (D)	Benjamin; Rosenthal (D)	James; J. Delaney (D)	Victor; Anfuso (D)	Eugene; Keogh (D)	Edna; F. Kelly (D)	Emanuel; Celler (D)	Hugh; Carey (D)	Abraham; J. Multer (D)	John; J. Rooney (D)	John; H. Ray (R)	Adam; Clayton; Powell; Jr. (D)	John; Lindsay (R)	Alfred E. Santangelo (D)	Leonard; Farbstein (D)	William Fitts; Ryan (D)	Herbert; Zelenko (D)	James; C. Healey (D)	Jacob H. Gilbert (D)	Charles; A. Buckley (D)	Paul; A. Fino (R)	Edwin; B. Dooley (R)	Robert; R. Barry (R)	Katharine; St. George (R)	J. Ernest; Wharton (R)	Leo W. O'Brien (D)	Carleton; J. King (R)	Samuel; S. Stratton (D)	Clarence; E. Kilburn (R)	Alexander; Pirnie (R)	R. Walter; Riehlman (R)	John; Taber (R)	Howard; W. Robison (R)	Jessica; M. Weis (R)	Harold; C. Ostertag (R)	William; E. Miller (R)	Thaddeus; J. Dulski (D)	John; R. Pillion (R)	Charles; Goodell (R)	87th (1961–1963)

=== 1963–1973: 41 seats ===
New York lost two seats following the 1960 census.

Congress
88th
(1963–1965)
89th
(1965–1967)
90th
(1967–1969)
91st
(1969–1971)
92nd
(1971–1973)

District										District										District										District										District	Congress
1st	2nd	3rd	4th	5th	6th	7th	8th	9th	10th	11th	12th	13th	14th	15th	16th	17th	18th	19th	20th	21st	22nd	23rd	24th	25th	26th	27th	28th	29th	30th	31st	32nd	33rd	34th	35th	36th	37th	38th	39th	40th	41st	Congress
Otis G. Pike (D)	James; R. Grover; Jr. (R)	Steven; Derounian (R)	John; W. Wydler (R)	Frank J. Becker (R)	Seymour; Halpern (R)	Joseph P. Addabbo (D)	Benjamin; Rosenthal (D)	James J. Delaney (D)	Emanuel; Celler (D)	Eugene; Keogh (D)	Edna F. Kelly (D)	Abraham; J. Multer (D)	John J. Rooney (D)	Hugh; Carey (D)	John M. Murphy (D)	John; Lindsay (R)	Adam; Clayton; Powell; Jr. (D)	Leonard; Farbstein (D)	William; Fitts; Ryan (D)	James C. Healey (D)	Jacob H. Gilbert (D)	Charles A. Buckley (D)	Paul A. Fino (R)	Robert R. Barry (R)	Ogden; Reid (R)	Katharine; St. George (R)	J. Ernest; Wharton (R)	Leo W. O'Brien (D)	Carleton; J. King (R)	Clarence E. Kilburn (R)	Alexander; Pirnie (R)	Howard; W. Robison (R)	R. Walter; Riehlman (R)	Samuel S. Stratton (D)	Frank; Horton (R)	Harold C. Ostertag (R)	Charles; Goodell (R)	John R. Pillion (R)	William E. Miller (R)	Thaddeus; J. Dulski (D)	88th (1963–1965)
Otis G. Pike (D)	James; R. Grover; Jr. (R)	Lester L. Wolff (D)	John; W. Wydler (R)	Herbert; Tenzer (D)	Seymour; Halpern (R)	Joseph P. Addabbo (D)	Benjamin; Rosenthal (D)	James J. Delaney (D)	Emanuel; Celler (D)	Eugene; Keogh (D)	Edna F. Kelly (D)	Abraham; J. Multer (D)	John J. Rooney (D)	Hugh; Carey (D)	John M. Murphy (D)	John; Lindsay (R)	Adam; Clayton; Powell; Jr. (D)	Leonard; Farbstein (D)	William; Fitts; Ryan (D)	Jim; Scheuer (D-Lib)	Jacob H. Gilbert (D)	Jonathan; B. Bingham (D)	Paul A. Fino (R)	Richard; Ottinger (D)	Ogden; Reid (R)	John G. Dow (D)	Joseph Y. Resnick (D)	Leo W. O'Brien (D)	Carleton; J. King (R)	Robert C. McEwen (R)	Alexander; Pirnie (R)	Howard; W. Robison (R)	James M. Hanley (D)	Samuel S. Stratton (D)	Frank; Horton (R)	Barber; Conable (R)	Charles; Goodell (R)	Richard D. McCarthy (D)	Henry P. Smith III (R)	Thaddeus; J. Dulski (D)	89th (1965–1967)
Otis G. Pike (D)	James; R. Grover; Jr. (R)	Lester L. Wolff (D)	John; W. Wydler (R)	Herbert; Tenzer (D)	Seymour; Halpern (R)	Joseph P. Addabbo (D)	Benjamin; Rosenthal (D)	James J. Delaney (D)	Emanuel; Celler (D)	Eugene; Keogh (D)	Edna F. Kelly (D)	Abraham; J. Multer (D)	John J. Rooney (D)	Hugh; Carey (D)	John M. Murphy (D)	Theodore R. Kupferman (R)	Adam; Clayton; Powell; Jr. (D)	Leonard; Farbstein (D)	William; Fitts; Ryan (D)	Jim; Scheuer (D-Lib)	Jacob H. Gilbert (D)	Jonathan; B. Bingham (D)	Paul A. Fino (R)	Richard; Ottinger (D)	Ogden; Reid (R)	John G. Dow (D)	Joseph Y. Resnick (D)	vacant	Carleton; J. King (R)	Robert C. McEwen (R)	Alexander; Pirnie (R)	Howard; W. Robison (R)	James M. Hanley (D)	Samuel S. Stratton (D)	Frank; Horton (R)	Barber; Conable (R)	Charles; Goodell (R)	Richard D. McCarthy (D)	Henry P. Smith III (R)	Thaddeus; J. Dulski (D)	89th (1965–1967)
Otis G. Pike (D)	James; R. Grover; Jr. (R)	Lester L. Wolff (D)	John; W. Wydler (R)	Herbert; Tenzer (D)	Seymour; Halpern (R)	Joseph P. Addabbo (D)	Benjamin; Rosenthal (D)	James J. Delaney (D)	Emanuel; Celler (D)	Frank J. Brasco (D)	Edna F. Kelly (D)	Abraham; J. Multer (D)	John J. Rooney (D)	Hugh; Carey (D)	John M. Murphy (D)	Theodore R. Kupferman (R)	vacant	Leonard; Farbstein (D)	William; Fitts; Ryan (D)	Jim; Scheuer (D-Lib)	Jacob H. Gilbert (D)	Jonathan; B. Bingham (D)	Paul A. Fino (R)	Richard; Ottinger (D)	Ogden; Reid (R)	John G. Dow (D)	Joseph Y. Resnick (D)	Daniel E. Button (R)	Carleton; J. King (R)	Robert C. McEwen (R)	Alexander; Pirnie (R)	Howard; W. Robison (R)	James M. Hanley (D)	Samuel S. Stratton (D)	Frank; Horton (R)	Barber; Conable (R)	Charles; Goodell (R)	Richard D. McCarthy (D)	Henry P. Smith III (R)	Thaddeus; J. Dulski (D)	90th (1967–1969)
Otis G. Pike (D)	James; R. Grover; Jr. (R)	Lester L. Wolff (D)	John; W. Wydler (R)	Herbert; Tenzer (D)	Seymour; Halpern (R)	Joseph P. Addabbo (D)	Benjamin; Rosenthal (D)	James J. Delaney (D)	Emanuel; Celler (D)	Frank J. Brasco (D)	Edna F. Kelly (D)	Bertram; L. Podell (D)	John J. Rooney (D)	Hugh; Carey (D)	John M. Murphy (D)	Theodore R. Kupferman (R)	Adam; Clayton; Powell Jr. (D)	Leonard; Farbstein (D)	William; Fitts; Ryan (D)	Jim; Scheuer (D-Lib)	Jacob H. Gilbert (D)	Jonathan; B. Bingham (D)	vacant	Richard; Ottinger (D)	Ogden; Reid (R)	John G. Dow (D)	Joseph Y. Resnick (D)	Daniel E. Button (R)	Carleton; J. King (R)	Robert C. McEwen (R)	Alexander; Pirnie (R)	Howard; W. Robison (R)	James M. Hanley (D)	Samuel S. Stratton (D)	Frank; Horton (R)	Barber; Conable (R)	vacant	Richard D. McCarthy (D)	Henry P. Smith III (R)	Thaddeus; J. Dulski (D)	90th (1967–1969)
Otis G. Pike (D)	James; R. Grover; Jr. (R)	Lester L. Wolff (D)	John; W. Wydler (R)	Allard K. Lowenstein (D)	Seymour; Halpern (R)	Joseph P. Addabbo (D)	Benjamin; Rosenthal (D)	James J. Delaney (D)	Emanuel; Celler (D)	Frank J. Brasco (D)	Shirley; Chisholm (D)	Bertram; L. Podell (D)	John J. Rooney (D)	Hugh; Carey (D)	John M. Murphy (D)	Ed; Koch (D)	Adam; Clayton; Powell Jr. (D)	Leonard; Farbstein (D)	William; Fitts; Ryan (D)	Jim; Scheuer (D-Lib)	Jacob H. Gilbert (D)	Jonathan; B. Bingham (D)	Mario; Biaggi (D)	Richard; Ottinger (D)	Ogden; Reid (R)	Martin B. McKneally (R)	Hamilton; Fish IV (R)	Daniel E. Button (R)	Carleton; J. King (R)	Robert C. McEwen (R)	Alexander; Pirnie (R)	Howard; W. Robison (R)	James M. Hanley (D)	Samuel S. Stratton (D)	Frank; Horton (R)	Barber; Conable (R)	James F. Hastings (R)	Richard D. McCarthy (D)	Henry P. Smith III (R)	Thaddeus; J. Dulski (D)	91st (1969–1971)
Otis G. Pike (D)	James; R. Grover; Jr. (R)	Lester L. Wolff (D)	John; W. Wydler (R)	Norm; Lent (R-Con)	Seymour; Halpern (R)	Joseph P. Addabbo (D)	Benjamin; Rosenthal (D)	James J. Delaney (D)	Emanuel; Celler (D)	Frank J. Brasco (D)	Shirley; Chisholm (D)	Bertram; L. Podell (D)	John J. Rooney (D)	Hugh; Carey (D)	John M. Murphy (D)	Ed; Koch (D)	Charles; Rangel (D)	Bella; Abzug (D)	William; Fitts; Ryan (D)	Jim; Scheuer (D-Lib)	Herman; Badillo (D)	Jonathan; B. Bingham (D)	Mario; Biaggi (D)	Peter A. Peyser (R)	Ogden; Reid (R)	John G. Dow (D)	Hamilton; Fish IV (R)	Samuel S. Stratton (D)	Carleton; J. King (R)	Robert C. McEwen (R)	Alexander; Pirnie (R)	Howard; W. Robison (R)	John H. Terry (R)	James M. Hanley (D)	Frank; Horton (R)	Barber; Conable (R)	James F. Hastings (R)	Jack; Kemp (R)	Henry P. Smith III (R)	Thaddeus; J. Dulski (D)	92nd (1971–1973)
Otis G. Pike (D)	James; R. Grover; Jr. (R)	Lester L. Wolff (D)	John; W. Wydler (R)	Norm; Lent (R-Con)	Seymour; Halpern (R)	Joseph P. Addabbo (D)	Benjamin; Rosenthal (D)	James J. Delaney (D)	Emanuel; Celler (D)	Frank J. Brasco (D)	Shirley; Chisholm (D)	Bertram; L. Podell (D)	John J. Rooney (D)	Hugh; Carey (D)	John M. Murphy (D)	Ed; Koch (D)	Charles; Rangel (D)	Bella; Abzug (D)	vacant	Jim; Scheuer (D-Lib)	Herman; Badillo (D)	Jonathan; B. Bingham (D)	Mario; Biaggi (D)	Peter A. Peyser (R)	Ogden Reid (D)	John G. Dow (D)	Hamilton; Fish IV (R)	Samuel S. Stratton (D)	Carleton; J. King (R)	Robert C. McEwen (R)	Alexander; Pirnie (R)	Howard; W. Robison (R)	John H. Terry (R)	James M. Hanley (D)	Frank; Horton (R)	Barber; Conable (R)	James F. Hastings (R)	Jack; Kemp (R)	Henry P. Smith III (R)	Thaddeus; J. Dulski (D)	92nd (1971–1973)

=== 1973–1983: 39 seats ===
New York lost two seats in the 1970 census.

Congress
93rd
(1973–1975)
94th
(1975–1977)
95th
(1977–1979)
96th
(1979–1981)
97th
(1981–1983)

District										District										District										District									Congress
1st	2nd	3rd	4th	5th	6th	7th	8th	9th	10th	11th	12th	13th	14th	15th	16th	17th	18th	19th	20th	21st	22nd	23rd	24th	25th	26th	27th	28th	29th	30th	31st	32nd	33rd	34th	35th	36th	37th	38th	39th	Congress
Otis; G. Pike (D)	James R. Grover; Jr. (R)	Angelo D. Roncallo (R)	Norm; Lent (R-Con)	John W. Wydler (R)	Lester L. Wolff (D)	Joseph P. Addabbo (D)	Benjamin; Rosenthal (D)	James J. Delaney (D)	Mario; Biaggi (D)	Frank J. Brasco (D)	Shirley; Chisholm (D)	Bert; Podell (D)	John J. Rooney (D)	Hugh; Carey (D)	Elizabeth; Holtzman (D)	John M. Murphy (D)	Ed; Koch (D)	Charles; Rangel (D)	Bella; Abzug (D)	Herman; Badillo (D)	Jonathan; B. Bingham (D)	Peter A. Peyser (R)	Ogden; Reid (D)	Hamilton; Fish IV (R)	Benjamin; Gilman (R)	Howard; Robison (R)	Samuel; S. Stratton (D)	Carleton; J. King (R)	Robert C. McEwen (R)	Donald; J. Mitchell (R)	James M. Hanley (D)	Bill; Walsh (R)	Frank; Horton (R)	Barber; Conable (R)	Henry P. Smith III (R)	Thaddeus; Dulski (D)	Jack; Kemp (R)	James F. Hastings (R)	93rd (1973–1975)
Otis; G. Pike (D)	James R. Grover; Jr. (R)	Angelo D. Roncallo (R)	Norm; Lent (R-Con)	John W. Wydler (R)	Lester L. Wolff (D)	Joseph P. Addabbo (D)	Benjamin; Rosenthal (D)	James J. Delaney (D)	Mario; Biaggi (D)	Frank J. Brasco (D)	Shirley; Chisholm (D)	Bert; Podell (D)	vacant	vacant	Elizabeth; Holtzman (D)	John M. Murphy (D)	Ed; Koch (D)	Charles; Rangel (D)	Bella; Abzug (D)	Herman; Badillo (D)	Jonathan; B. Bingham (D)	Peter A. Peyser (R)	Ogden; Reid (D)	Hamilton; Fish IV (R)	Benjamin; Gilman (R)	Howard; Robison (R)	Samuel; S. Stratton (D)	vacant	Robert C. McEwen (R)	Donald; J. Mitchell (R)	James M. Hanley (D)	Bill; Walsh (R)	Frank; Horton (R)	Barber; Conable (R)	Henry P. Smith III (R)	vacant	Jack; Kemp (R)	James F. Hastings (R)	93rd (1973–1975)
Otis; G. Pike (D)	Thomas; Downey (D)	Jerome; Ambro (D)	Norm; Lent (R-Con)	John W. Wydler (R)	Lester L. Wolff (D)	Joseph P. Addabbo (D)	Benjamin; Rosenthal (D)	James J. Delaney (D)	Mario; Biaggi (D)	Jim; Scheuer (D-Lib)	Shirley; Chisholm (D)	Steve; Solarz (D)	Fred; Richmond (D)	Leo C. Zeferetti (D)	Elizabeth; Holtzman (D)	John M. Murphy (D)	Ed; Koch (D)	Charles; Rangel (D)	Bella; Abzug (D)	Herman; Badillo (D)	Jonathan; B. Bingham (D)	Peter A. Peyser (R)	Richard; Ottinger (D)	Hamilton; Fish IV (R)	Benjamin; Gilman (R)	Matt; McHugh (D)	Samuel; S. Stratton (D)	Edward; W. Pattison (D)	Robert C. McEwen (R)	Donald; J. Mitchell (R)	James M. Hanley (D)	Bill; Walsh (R)	Frank; Horton (R)	Barber; Conable (R)	John; LaFalce (D)	Henry J. Nowak (D)	Jack; Kemp (R)	James F. Hastings (R)	94th (1975–1977)
Otis; G. Pike (D)	Thomas; Downey (D)	Jerome; Ambro (D)	Norm; Lent (R-Con)	John W. Wydler (R)	Lester L. Wolff (D)	Joseph P. Addabbo (D)	Benjamin; Rosenthal (D)	James J. Delaney (D)	Mario; Biaggi (D)	Jim; Scheuer (D-Lib)	Shirley; Chisholm (D)	Steve; Solarz (D)	Fred; Richmond (D)	Leo C. Zeferetti (D)	Elizabeth; Holtzman (D)	John M. Murphy (D)	Ed; Koch (D)	Charles; Rangel (D)	Bella; Abzug (D)	Herman; Badillo (D)	Jonathan; B. Bingham (D)	Peter A. Peyser (R)	Richard; Ottinger (D)	Hamilton; Fish IV (R)	Benjamin; Gilman (R)	Matt; McHugh (D)	Samuel; S. Stratton (D)	Edward; W. Pattison (D)	Robert C. McEwen (R)	Donald; J. Mitchell (R)	James M. Hanley (D)	Bill; Walsh (R)	Frank; Horton (R)	Barber; Conable (R)	John; LaFalce (D)	Henry J. Nowak (D)	Jack; Kemp (R)	Stan; Lundine (D)	94th (1975–1977)
Otis; G. Pike (D)	Thomas; Downey (D)	Jerome; Ambro (D)	Norm; Lent (R-Con)	John W. Wydler (R)	Lester L. Wolff (D)	Joseph P. Addabbo (D)	Benjamin; Rosenthal (D)	James J. Delaney (D)	Mario; Biaggi (D)	Jim; Scheuer (D-Lib)	Shirley; Chisholm (D)	Steve; Solarz (D)	Fred; Richmond (D)	Leo C. Zeferetti (D)	Elizabeth; Holtzman (D)	John M. Murphy (D)	Ed; Koch (D)	Charles; Rangel (D)	Ted; Weiss (D)	Herman; Badillo (D)	Jonathan; B. Bingham (D)	Bruce F. Caputo (R)	Richard; Ottinger (D)	Hamilton; Fish IV (R)	Benjamin; Gilman (R)	Matt; McHugh (D)	Samuel; S. Stratton (D)	Edward; W. Pattison (D)	Robert C. McEwen (R)	Donald; J. Mitchell (R)	James M. Hanley (D)	Bill; Walsh (R)	Frank; Horton (R)	Barber; Conable (R)	John; LaFalce (D)	Henry J. Nowak (D)	Jack; Kemp (R)	Stan; Lundine (D)	95th (1977–1979)
Otis; G. Pike (D)	Thomas; Downey (D)	Jerome; Ambro (D)	Norm; Lent (R-Con)	John W. Wydler (R)	Lester L. Wolff (D)	Joseph P. Addabbo (D)	Benjamin; Rosenthal (D)	vacant	Mario; Biaggi (D)	Jim; Scheuer (D-Lib)	Shirley; Chisholm (D)	Steve; Solarz (D)	Fred; Richmond (D)	Leo C. Zeferetti (D)	Elizabeth; Holtzman (D)	John M. Murphy (D)	Bill; Green (R)	Charles; Rangel (D)	Ted; Weiss (D)	Bob; Garcia (D)	Jonathan; B. Bingham (D)	Bruce F. Caputo (R)	Richard; Ottinger (D)	Hamilton; Fish IV (R)	Benjamin; Gilman (R)	Matt; McHugh (D)	Samuel; S. Stratton (D)	Edward; W. Pattison (D)	Robert C. McEwen (R)	Donald; J. Mitchell (R)	James M. Hanley (D)	Bill; Walsh (R)	Frank; Horton (R)	Barber; Conable (R)	John; LaFalce (D)	Henry J. Nowak (D)	Jack; Kemp (R)	Stan; Lundine (D)	95th (1977–1979)
Bill; Carney (Con)	Thomas; Downey (D)	Jerome; Ambro (D)	Norm; Lent (R-Con)	John W. Wydler (R)	Lester L. Wolff (D)	Joseph P. Addabbo (D)	Benjamin; Rosenthal (D)	Geraldine; Ferraro (D)	Mario; Biaggi (D)	Jim; Scheuer (D-Lib)	Shirley; Chisholm (D)	Steve; Solarz (D)	Fred; Richmond (D)	Leo C. Zeferetti (D)	Elizabeth; Holtzman (D)	John M. Murphy (D)	Bill; Green (R)	Charles; Rangel (D)	Ted; Weiss (D)	Bob; Garcia (D)	Jonathan; B. Bingham (D)	Peter A. Peyser (D)	Richard; Ottinger (D)	Hamilton; Fish IV (R)	Benjamin; Gilman (R)	Matt; McHugh (D)	Samuel; S. Stratton (D)	Jerry; Solomon (R)	Robert C. McEwen (R)	Donald; J. Mitchell (R)	James M. Hanley (D)	Gary A. Lee (R)	Frank; Horton (R)	Barber; Conable (R)	John; LaFalce (D)	Henry J. Nowak (D)	Jack; Kemp (R)	Stan; Lundine (D)	96th (1979–1981)
Bill; Carney (Con)	Thomas; Downey (D)	Gregory W. Carman (R)	Norm; Lent (R-Con)	Ray; McGrath (R)	John; LeBoutillier (R)	Joseph P. Addabbo (D)	Benjamin; Rosenthal (D)	Geraldine; Ferraro (D)	Mario; Biaggi (D)	Jim; Scheuer (D-Lib)	Shirley; Chisholm (D)	Steve; Solarz (D)	Fred; Richmond (D)	Leo C. Zeferetti (D)	Chuck; Schumer (D)	Guy; Molinari (R)	Bill; Green (R)	Charles; Rangel (D)	Ted; Weiss (D)	Bob; Garcia (D)	Jonathan; B. Bingham (D)	Peter A. Peyser (D)	Richard; Ottinger (D)	Hamilton; Fish IV (R)	Benjamin; Gilman (R)	Matt; McHugh (D)	Samuel; S. Stratton (D)	Jerry; Solomon (R)	David O. Martin (R)	Donald; J. Mitchell (R)	George C. Wortley (R)	Gary A. Lee (R)	Frank; Horton (R)	Barber; Conable (R)	John; LaFalce (D)	Henry J. Nowak (D)	Jack; Kemp (R)	Stan; Lundine (D)	97th (1981–1983)

=== 1983–1993: 34 seats ===
New York lost five seats in the 1980 census.

Congress
98th
(1983–1985)
99th
(1985–1987)
100th
(1987–1989)
101st
(1989–1991)
102nd
(1991–1993)

District										District										District										District				Congress
1st	2nd	3rd	4th	5th	6th	7th	8th	9th	10th	11th	12th	13th	14th	15th	16th	17th	18th	19th	20th	21st	22nd	23rd	24th	25th	26th	27th	28th	29th	30th	31st	32nd	33rd	34th	Congress
Bill; Carney (Con)	Thomas; Downey (D)	Robert; J. Mrazek (D)	Norm; Lent (R-Con)	Ray; McGrath (R)	Joseph P. Addabbo (D)	Benjamin; Rosenthal (D)	Jim; Scheuer (D-Lib)	Geraldine; Ferraro (D)	Chuck; Schumer (D)	Ed; Towns (D)	Major; Owens (D)	Steve; Solarz (D)	Guy; Molinari (R)	Bill; Green (R)	Charles; Rangel (D)	Ted; Weiss (D)	Bob; Garcia (D)	Mario; Biaggi (D)	Richard; Ottinger (D)	Hamilton; Fish IV (R)	Benjamin; Gilman (R)	Samuel; S. Stratton (D)	Jerry; Solomon (R)	Sherry; Boehlert (R)	David; O'Brien; Martin (R)	George; C. Wortley (R)	Matt; McHugh (D)	Frank; Horton (R)	Barber; Conable (R)	Jack; Kemp (R)	John; LaFalce (D)	Henry; J. Nowak (D)	Stan; Lundine (D)	98th (1983–1985)
Bill; Carney (Con)	Thomas; Downey (D)	Robert; J. Mrazek (D)	Norm; Lent (R-Con)	Ray; McGrath (R)	Joseph P. Addabbo (D)	Gary; Ackerman (D)	Jim; Scheuer (D-Lib)	Geraldine; Ferraro (D)	Chuck; Schumer (D)	Ed; Towns (D)	Major; Owens (D)	Steve; Solarz (D)	Guy; Molinari (R)	Bill; Green (R)	Charles; Rangel (D)	Ted; Weiss (D)	Bob; Garcia (D)	Mario; Biaggi (D)	Richard; Ottinger (D)	Hamilton; Fish IV (R)	Benjamin; Gilman (R)	Samuel; S. Stratton (D)	Jerry; Solomon (R)	Sherry; Boehlert (R)	David; O'Brien; Martin (R)	George; C. Wortley (R)	Matt; McHugh (D)	Frank; Horton (R)	Barber; Conable (R)	Jack; Kemp (R)	John; LaFalce (D)	Henry; J. Nowak (D)	Stan; Lundine (D)	98th (1983–1985)
Bill; Carney (R)	Thomas; Downey (D)	Robert; J. Mrazek (D)	Norm; Lent (R-Con)	Ray; McGrath (R)	Joseph P. Addabbo (D)	Gary; Ackerman (D)	Jim; Scheuer (D-Lib)	Thomas; Manton (D)	Chuck; Schumer (D)	Ed; Towns (D)	Major; Owens (D)	Steve; Solarz (D)	Guy; Molinari (R)	Bill; Green (R)	Charles; Rangel (D)	Ted; Weiss (D)	Bob; Garcia (D)	Mario; Biaggi (D)	Joe; DioGuardi (R)	Hamilton; Fish IV (R)	Benjamin; Gilman (R)	Samuel; S. Stratton (D)	Jerry; Solomon (R)	Sherry; Boehlert (R)	David; O'Brien; Martin (R)	George; C. Wortley (R)	Matt; McHugh (D)	Frank; Horton (R)	Fred J. Eckert (R)	Jack; Kemp (R)	John; LaFalce (D)	Henry; J. Nowak (D)	Stan; Lundine (D)	99th (1985–1987)
Bill; Carney (R)	Thomas; Downey (D)	Robert; J. Mrazek (D)	Norm; Lent (R-Con)	Ray; McGrath (R)	Alton Waldon (D)	Gary; Ackerman (D)	Jim; Scheuer (D-Lib)	Thomas; Manton (D)	Chuck; Schumer (D)	Ed; Towns (D)	Major; Owens (D)	Steve; Solarz (D)	Guy; Molinari (R)	Bill; Green (R)	Charles; Rangel (D)	Ted; Weiss (D)	Bob; Garcia (D)	Mario; Biaggi (D)	Joe; DioGuardi (R)	Hamilton; Fish IV (R)	Benjamin; Gilman (R)	Samuel; S. Stratton (D)	Jerry; Solomon (R)	Sherry; Boehlert (R)	David; O'Brien; Martin (R)	George; C. Wortley (R)	Matt; McHugh (D)	Frank; Horton (R)	Fred J. Eckert (R)	Jack; Kemp (R)	John; LaFalce (D)	Henry; J. Nowak (D)	Stan; Lundine (D)	99th (1985–1987)
George J. Hoch- brueckner (D)	Thomas; Downey (D)	Robert; J. Mrazek (D)	Norm; Lent (R-Con)	Ray; McGrath (R)	Floyd; Flake (D)	Gary; Ackerman (D)	Jim; Scheuer (D-Lib)	Thomas; Manton (D)	Chuck; Schumer (D)	Ed; Towns (D)	Major; Owens (D)	Steve; Solarz (D)	Guy; Molinari (R)	Bill; Green (R)	Charles; Rangel (D)	Ted; Weiss (D)	Bob; Garcia (D)	Mario; Biaggi (D)	Joe; DioGuardi (R)	Hamilton; Fish IV (R)	Benjamin; Gilman (R)	Samuel; S. Stratton (D)	Jerry; Solomon (R)	Sherry; Boehlert (R)	David; O'Brien; Martin (R)	George; C. Wortley (R)	Matt; McHugh (D)	Frank; Horton (R)	Louise; Slaughter (D)	Jack; Kemp (R)	John; LaFalce (D)	Henry; J. Nowak (D)	Amo; Houghton (R)	100th (1987–1989)
George J. Hoch- brueckner (D)	Thomas; Downey (D)	Robert; J. Mrazek (D)	Norm; Lent (R-Con)	Ray; McGrath (R)	Floyd; Flake (D)	Gary; Ackerman (D)	Jim; Scheuer (D-Lib)	Thomas; Manton (D)	Chuck; Schumer (D)	Ed; Towns (D)	Major; Owens (D)	Steve; Solarz (D)	Guy; Molinari (R)	Bill; Green (R)	Charles; Rangel (D)	Ted; Weiss (D)	Bob; Garcia (D)	vacant	Joe; DioGuardi (R)	Hamilton; Fish IV (R)	Benjamin; Gilman (R)	Samuel; S. Stratton (D)	Jerry; Solomon (R)	Sherry; Boehlert (R)	David; O'Brien; Martin (R)	George; C. Wortley (R)	Matt; McHugh (D)	Frank; Horton (R)	Louise; Slaughter (D)	Jack; Kemp (R)	John; LaFalce (D)	Henry; J. Nowak (D)	Amo; Houghton (R)	100th (1987–1989)
George J. Hoch- brueckner (D)	Thomas; Downey (D)	Robert; J. Mrazek (D)	Norm; Lent (R-Con)	Ray; McGrath (R)	Floyd; Flake (D)	Gary; Ackerman (D)	Jim; Scheuer (D-Lib)	Thomas; Manton (D)	Chuck; Schumer (D)	Ed; Towns (D)	Major; Owens (D)	Steve; Solarz (D)	Guy; Molinari (R)	Bill; Green (R)	Charles; Rangel (D)	Ted; Weiss (D)	Bob; Garcia (D)	Eliot; Engel (D)	Nita; Lowey (D)	Hamilton; Fish IV (R)	Benjamin; Gilman (R)	Mike; McNulty (D)	Jerry; Solomon (R)	Sherry; Boehlert (R)	David; O'Brien; Martin (R)	James; T. Walsh (R)	Matt; McHugh (D)	Frank; Horton (R)	Louise; Slaughter (D)	Bill; Paxon (R)	John; LaFalce (D)	Henry; J. Nowak (D)	Amo; Houghton (R)	101st (1989–1991)
George J. Hoch- brueckner (D)	Thomas; Downey (D)	Robert; J. Mrazek (D)	Norm; Lent (R-Con)	Ray; McGrath (R)	Floyd; Flake (D)	Gary; Ackerman (D)	Jim; Scheuer (D-Lib)	Thomas; Manton (D)	Chuck; Schumer (D)	Ed; Towns (D)	Major; Owens (D)	Steve; Solarz (D)	Susan; Molinari (R)	Bill; Green (R)	Charles; Rangel (D)	Ted; Weiss (D)	José E. Serrano (D)	Eliot; Engel (D)	Nita; Lowey (D)	Hamilton; Fish IV (R)	Benjamin; Gilman (R)	Mike; McNulty (D)	Jerry; Solomon (R)	Sherry; Boehlert (R)	David; O'Brien; Martin (R)	James; T. Walsh (R)	Matt; McHugh (D)	Frank; Horton (R)	Louise; Slaughter (D)	Bill; Paxon (R)	John; LaFalce (D)	Henry; J. Nowak (D)	Amo; Houghton (R)	101st (1989–1991)
George J. Hoch- brueckner (D)	Thomas; Downey (D)	Robert; J. Mrazek (D)	Norm; Lent (R-Con)	Ray; McGrath (R)	Floyd; Flake (D)	Gary; Ackerman (D)	Jim; Scheuer (D-Lib)	Thomas; Manton (D)	Chuck; Schumer (D)	Ed; Towns (D)	Major; Owens (D)	Steve; Solarz (D)	Susan; Molinari (R)	Bill; Green (R)	Charles; Rangel (D)	Ted; Weiss (D)	José E. Serrano (D)	Eliot; Engel (D)	Nita; Lowey (D)	Hamilton; Fish IV (R)	Benjamin; Gilman (R)	Mike; McNulty (D)	Jerry; Solomon (R)	Sherry; Boehlert (R)	David; O'Brien; Martin (R)	James; T. Walsh (R)	Matt; McHugh (D)	Frank; Horton (R)	Louise; Slaughter (D)	Bill; Paxon (R)	John; LaFalce (D)	Henry; J. Nowak (D)	Amo; Houghton (R)	102nd (1991–1993)
George J. Hoch- brueckner (D)	Thomas; Downey (D)	Robert; J. Mrazek (D)	Norm; Lent (R-Con)	Ray; McGrath (R)	Floyd; Flake (D)	Gary; Ackerman (D)	Jim; Scheuer (D-Lib)	Thomas; Manton (D)	Chuck; Schumer (D)	Ed; Towns (D)	Major; Owens (D)	Steve; Solarz (D)	Susan; Molinari (R)	Bill; Green (R)	Charles; Rangel (D)	Jerry Nadler (D)	José E. Serrano (D)	Eliot; Engel (D)	Nita; Lowey (D)	Hamilton; Fish IV (R)	Benjamin; Gilman (R)	Mike; McNulty (D)	Jerry; Solomon (R)	Sherry; Boehlert (R)	David; O'Brien; Martin (R)	James; T. Walsh (R)	Matt; McHugh (D)	Frank; Horton (R)	Louise; Slaughter (D)	Bill; Paxon (R)	John; LaFalce (D)	Henry; J. Nowak (D)	Amo; Houghton (R)	102nd (1991–1993)

=== 1993–2003: 31 seats ===
New York lost three seats in the 1990 census.

Congress
103rd
(1993–1995)
104th
(1995–1997)
105th
(1997–1999)
106th
(1999–2001)
107th
(2001–2003)

District										District										District										District	Congress
1st	2nd	3rd	4th	5th	6th	7th	8th	9th	10th	11th	12th	13th	14th	15th	16th	17th	18th	19th	20th	21st	22nd	23rd	24th	25th	26th	27th	28th	29th	30th	31st	Congress
George J. Hoch- brueckner (D)	Rick; Lazio (R)	Peter; King (R)	David A. Levy (R)	Gary; Ackerman (D)	Floyd; Flake (D)	Thomas; Manton (D)	Jerry; Nadler (D)	Chuck; Schumer (D)	Edolphus; Towns (D)	Major; Owens (D)	Nydia; Velázquez (D)	Susan; Molinari (R)	Carolyn; Maloney (D)	Charles; Rangel (D)	José E. Serrano (D)	Eliot; Engel (D)	Nita; Lowey (D)	Hamilton; Fish IV (R)	Benjamin; Gilman (R)	Mike; McNulty (D)	Jerry; Solomon (R)	Sherry; Boehlert (R)	John M. McHugh (R)	James; T. Walsh (R)	Maurice; Hinchey (D)	Bill; Paxon (R)	Louise; Slaughter (D)	John; LaFalce (D)	Jack; Quinn (R)	Amo; Houghton (R)	103rd (1993–1995)
Michael; Forbes (R)	Rick; Lazio (R)	Peter; King (R)	Dan; Frisa (R)	Gary; Ackerman (D)	Floyd; Flake (D)	Thomas; Manton (D)	Jerry; Nadler (D)	Chuck; Schumer (D)	Edolphus; Towns (D)	Major; Owens (D)	Nydia; Velázquez (D)	Susan; Molinari (R)	Carolyn; Maloney (D)	Charles; Rangel (D)	José E. Serrano (D)	Eliot; Engel (D)	Nita; Lowey (D)	Sue; Kelly (R)	Benjamin; Gilman (R)	Mike; McNulty (D)	Jerry; Solomon (R)	Sherry; Boehlert (R)	John M. McHugh (R)	James; T. Walsh (R)	Maurice; Hinchey (D)	Bill; Paxon (R)	Louise; Slaughter (D)	John; LaFalce (D)	Jack; Quinn (R)	Amo; Houghton (R)	104th (1995–1997)
Michael; Forbes (R)	Rick; Lazio (R)	Peter; King (R)	Carolyn; McCarthy (D)	Gary; Ackerman (D)	Floyd; Flake (D)	Thomas; Manton (D)	Jerry; Nadler (D)	Chuck; Schumer (D)	Edolphus; Towns (D)	Major; Owens (D)	Nydia; Velázquez (D)	Susan; Molinari (R)	Carolyn; Maloney (D)	Charles; Rangel (D)	José E. Serrano (D)	Eliot; Engel (D)	Nita; Lowey (D)	Sue; Kelly (R)	Benjamin; Gilman (R)	Mike; McNulty (D)	Jerry; Solomon (R)	Sherry; Boehlert (R)	John M. McHugh (R)	James; T. Walsh (R)	Maurice; Hinchey (D)	Bill; Paxon (R)	Louise; Slaughter (D)	John; LaFalce (D)	Jack; Quinn (R)	Amo; Houghton (R)	105th (1997–1999)
Michael; Forbes (R)	Rick; Lazio (R)	Peter; King (R)	Carolyn; McCarthy (D)	Gary; Ackerman (D)	Gregory; Meeks (D)	Joe; Crowley (D)	Jerry; Nadler (D)	Anthony; Weiner (D)	Edolphus; Towns (D)	Major; Owens (D)	Nydia; Velázquez (D)	Vito; Fossella (R)	Carolyn; Maloney (D)	Charles; Rangel (D)	José E. Serrano (D)	Eliot; Engel (D)	Nita; Lowey (D)	Sue; Kelly (R)	Benjamin; Gilman (R)	Mike; McNulty (D)	John E. Sweeney (R)	Sherry; Boehlert (R)	John M. McHugh (R)	James; T. Walsh (R)	Maurice; Hinchey (D)	Thomas; M. Reynolds (R)	Louise; Slaughter (D)	John; LaFalce (D)	Jack; Quinn (R)	Amo; Houghton (R)	106th (1999–2001)
Michael Forbes (D)	Rick; Lazio (R)	Peter; King (R)	Carolyn; McCarthy (D)	Gary; Ackerman (D)	Gregory; Meeks (D)	Joe; Crowley (D)	Jerry; Nadler (D)	Anthony; Weiner (D)	Edolphus; Towns (D)	Major; Owens (D)	Nydia; Velázquez (D)	Vito; Fossella (R)	Carolyn; Maloney (D)	Charles; Rangel (D)	José E. Serrano (D)	Eliot; Engel (D)	Nita; Lowey (D)	Sue; Kelly (R)	Benjamin; Gilman (R)	Mike; McNulty (D)	John E. Sweeney (R)	Sherry; Boehlert (R)	John M. McHugh (R)	James; T. Walsh (R)	Maurice; Hinchey (D)	Thomas; M. Reynolds (R)	Louise; Slaughter (D)	John; LaFalce (D)	Jack; Quinn (R)	Amo; Houghton (R)	106th (1999–2001)
Felix; Grucci (R)	Steve; Israel (D)	Peter; King (R)	Carolyn; McCarthy (D)	Gary; Ackerman (D)	Gregory; Meeks (D)	Joe; Crowley (D)	Jerry; Nadler (D)	Anthony; Weiner (D)	Edolphus; Towns (D)	Major; Owens (D)	Nydia; Velázquez (D)	Vito; Fossella (R)	Carolyn; Maloney (D)	Charles; Rangel (D)	José E. Serrano (D)	Eliot; Engel (D)	Nita; Lowey (D)	Sue; Kelly (R)	Benjamin; Gilman (R)	Mike; McNulty (D)	John E. Sweeney (R)	Sherry; Boehlert (R)	John M. McHugh (R)	James; T. Walsh (R)	Maurice; Hinchey (D)	Thomas; M. Reynolds (R)	Louise; Slaughter (D)	John; LaFalce (D)	Jack; Quinn (R)	Amo; Houghton (R)	107th (2001–2003)

=== 2003–2013: 29 seats ===
New York lost two seats in the 2000 census.

Congress
108th
(2003–2005)
109th
(2005–2007)
110th
(2007–2009)
111th
(2009–2011)
112th
(2011–2013)

District										District										District									Congress
1st	2nd	3rd	4th	5th	6th	7th	8th	9th	10th	11th	12th	13th	14th	15th	16th	17th	18th	19th	20th	21st	22nd	23rd	24th	25th	26th	27th	28th	29th	Congress
Tim; Bishop (D)	Steve; Israel (D)	Peter; King (R)	Carolyn; McCarthy (D)	Gary; Ackerman (D)	Gregory; Meeks (D)	Joe; Crowley (D)	Jerry; Nadler (D)	Anthony; Weiner (D)	Edolphus; Towns (D)	Major; Owens (D)	Nydia; Velázquez (D)	Vito; Fossella (R)	Carolyn; Maloney (D)	Charles; Rangel (D)	José E. Serrano (D)	Eliot; Engel (D)	Nita; Lowey (D)	Sue; Kelly (R)	John E. Sweeney (R)	Mike; McNulty (D)	Maurice; Hinchey (D)	John M. McHugh (R)	Sherry; Boehlert (R)	James T. Walsh (R)	Thomas M. Reynolds (R)	Jack; Quinn (R)	Louise; Slaughter (D)	Amo; Houghton (R)	108th (2003–2005)
Tim; Bishop (D)	Steve; Israel (D)	Peter; King (R)	Carolyn; McCarthy (D)	Gary; Ackerman (D)	Gregory; Meeks (D)	Joe; Crowley (D)	Jerry; Nadler (D)	Anthony; Weiner (D)	Edolphus; Towns (D)	Major; Owens (D)	Nydia; Velázquez (D)	Vito; Fossella (R)	Carolyn; Maloney (D)	Charles; Rangel (D)	José E. Serrano (D)	Eliot; Engel (D)	Nita; Lowey (D)	Sue; Kelly (R)	John E. Sweeney (R)	Mike; McNulty (D)	Maurice; Hinchey (D)	John M. McHugh (R)	Sherry; Boehlert (R)	James T. Walsh (R)	Thomas M. Reynolds (R)	Brian; Higgins (D)	Louise; Slaughter (D)	Randy; Kuhl (R)	109th (2005–2007)
Tim; Bishop (D)	Steve; Israel (D)	Peter; King (R)	Carolyn; McCarthy (D)	Gary; Ackerman (D)	Gregory; Meeks (D)	Joe; Crowley (D)	Jerry; Nadler (D)	Anthony; Weiner (D)	Edolphus; Towns (D)	Yvette; Clarke (D)	Nydia; Velázquez (D)	Vito; Fossella (R)	Carolyn; Maloney (D)	Charles; Rangel (D)	José E. Serrano (D)	Eliot; Engel (D)	Nita; Lowey (D)	John; Hall (D)	Kirsten; Gillibrand (D)	Mike; McNulty (D)	Maurice; Hinchey (D)	John M. McHugh (R)	Mike; Arcuri (D)	James T. Walsh (R)	Thomas M. Reynolds (R)	Brian; Higgins (D)	Louise; Slaughter (D)	Randy; Kuhl (R)	110th (2007–2009)
Tim; Bishop (D)	Steve; Israel (D)	Peter; King (R)	Carolyn; McCarthy (D)	Gary; Ackerman (D)	Gregory; Meeks (D)	Joe; Crowley (D)	Jerry; Nadler (D)	Anthony; Weiner (D)	Edolphus; Towns (D)	Yvette; Clarke (D)	Nydia; Velázquez (D)	Michael; McMahon (D)	Carolyn; Maloney (D)	Charles; Rangel (D)	José E. Serrano (D)	Eliot; Engel (D)	Nita; Lowey (D)	John; Hall (D)	Kirsten; Gillibrand (D)	Paul; Tonko (D)	Maurice; Hinchey (D)	John M. McHugh (R)	Mike; Arcuri (D)	Dan; Maffei (D)	Chris Lee (R)	Brian; Higgins (D)	Louise; Slaughter (D)	Eric Massa (D)	111th (2009–2011)
Tim; Bishop (D)	Steve; Israel (D)	Peter; King (R)	Carolyn; McCarthy (D)	Gary; Ackerman (D)	Gregory; Meeks (D)	Joe; Crowley (D)	Jerry; Nadler (D)	Anthony; Weiner (D)	Edolphus; Towns (D)	Yvette; Clarke (D)	Nydia; Velázquez (D)	Michael; McMahon (D)	Carolyn; Maloney (D)	Charles; Rangel (D)	José E. Serrano (D)	Eliot; Engel (D)	Nita; Lowey (D)	John; Hall (D)	Scott Murphy (D)	Paul; Tonko (D)	Maurice; Hinchey (D)	Bill; Owens (D)	Mike; Arcuri (D)	Dan; Maffei (D)	Chris Lee (R)	Brian; Higgins (D)	Louise; Slaughter (D)	Tom Reed (R)	111th (2009–2011)
Tim; Bishop (D)	Steve; Israel (D)	Peter; King (R)	Carolyn; McCarthy (D)	Gary; Ackerman (D)	Gregory; Meeks (D)	Joe; Crowley (D)	Jerry; Nadler (D)	Anthony; Weiner (D)	Edolphus; Towns (D)	Yvette; Clarke (D)	Nydia; Velázquez (D)	Michael; Grimm (R)	Carolyn; Maloney (D)	Charles; Rangel (D)	José E. Serrano (D)	Eliot; Engel (D)	Nita; Lowey (D)	Nan Hay- worth (R)	Chris Gibson (R)	Paul; Tonko (D)	Maurice; Hinchey (D)	Bill; Owens (D)	Richard; Hanna (R)	Ann Marie; Buerkle (R)	Chris Lee (R)	Brian; Higgins (D)	Louise; Slaughter (D)	Tom Reed (R)	112th (2011–2013)
Tim; Bishop (D)	Steve; Israel (D)	Peter; King (R)	Carolyn; McCarthy (D)	Gary; Ackerman (D)	Gregory; Meeks (D)	Joe; Crowley (D)	Jerry; Nadler (D)	Bob Turner (R)	Edolphus; Towns (D)	Yvette; Clarke (D)	Nydia; Velázquez (D)	Michael; Grimm (R)	Carolyn; Maloney (D)	Charles; Rangel (D)	José E. Serrano (D)	Eliot; Engel (D)	Nita; Lowey (D)	Nan Hay- worth (R)	Chris Gibson (R)	Paul; Tonko (D)	Maurice; Hinchey (D)	Bill; Owens (D)	Richard; Hanna (R)	Ann Marie; Buerkle (R)	Kathy Hochul (D)	Brian; Higgins (D)	Louise; Slaughter (D)	Tom Reed (R)	112th (2011–2013)

=== 2013–2023: 27 seats ===
New York lost two seats in the 2010 census.

Congress
113th
(2013–2015)
114th
(2015–2017)
115th
(2017–2019)
116th
(2019–2021)
117th
(2021–2023)

District																											Congress
1st	2nd	3rd	4th	5th	6th	7th	8th	9th	10th	11th	12th	13th	14th	15th	16th	17th	18th	19th	20th	21st	22nd	23rd	24th	25th	26th	27th	Congress
Tim; Bishop (D)	Peter; King (R)	Steve; Israel (D)	Carolyn; McCarthy (D)	Gregory; Meeks (D)	Grace; Meng (D)	Nydia; Velázquez (D)	Hakeem; Jeffries (D)	Yvette; Clarke (D)	Jerry; Nadler (D)	Michael; Grimm (R)	Carolyn; Maloney (D)	Charles; Rangel (D)	Joe; Crowley (D)	José E. Serrano (D)	Eliot; Engel (D)	Nita; Lowey (D)	Sean; Patrick; Maloney (D)	Chris; Gibson (R)	Paul; Tonko (D)	Bill; Owens (D)	Richard; Hanna (R)	Tom; Reed (R)	Dan; Maffei (D)	Louise; Slaughter (D)	Brian; Higgins (D)	Chris; Collins (R)	113th (2013–2015)
Lee; Zeldin (R)	Peter; King (R)	Steve; Israel (D)	Kathleen; Rice (D)	Gregory; Meeks (D)	Grace; Meng (D)	Nydia; Velázquez (D)	Hakeem; Jeffries (D)	Yvette; Clarke (D)	Jerry; Nadler (D)	Michael; Grimm (R)	Carolyn; Maloney (D)	Charles; Rangel (D)	Joe; Crowley (D)	José E. Serrano (D)	Eliot; Engel (D)	Nita; Lowey (D)	Sean; Patrick; Maloney (D)	Chris; Gibson (R)	Paul; Tonko (D)	Elise; Stefanik (R)	Richard; Hanna (R)	Tom; Reed (R)	John; Katko (R)	Louise; Slaughter (D)	Brian; Higgins (D)	Chris; Collins (R)	114th (2015–2017)
Lee; Zeldin (R)	Peter; King (R)	Steve; Israel (D)	Kathleen; Rice (D)	Gregory; Meeks (D)	Grace; Meng (D)	Nydia; Velázquez (D)	Hakeem; Jeffries (D)	Yvette; Clarke (D)	Jerry; Nadler (D)	Dan; Donovan (R)	Carolyn; Maloney (D)	Charles; Rangel (D)	Joe; Crowley (D)	José E. Serrano (D)	Eliot; Engel (D)	Nita; Lowey (D)	Sean; Patrick; Maloney (D)	Chris; Gibson (R)	Paul; Tonko (D)	Elise; Stefanik (R)	Richard; Hanna (R)	Tom; Reed (R)	John; Katko (R)	Louise; Slaughter (D)	Brian; Higgins (D)	Chris; Collins (R)	114th (2015–2017)
Lee; Zeldin (R)	Peter; King (R)	Tom; Suozzi (D)	Kathleen; Rice (D)	Gregory; Meeks (D)	Grace; Meng (D)	Nydia; Velázquez (D)	Hakeem; Jeffries (D)	Yvette; Clarke (D)	Jerry; Nadler (D)	Dan; Donovan (R)	Carolyn; Maloney (D)	Adriano; Espaillat (D)	Joe; Crowley (D)	José E. Serrano (D)	Eliot; Engel (D)	Nita; Lowey (D)	Sean; Patrick; Maloney (D)	John; Faso (R)	Paul; Tonko (D)	Elise; Stefanik (R)	Claudia; Tenney (R)	Tom; Reed (R)	John; Katko (R)	Louise; Slaughter (D)	Brian; Higgins (D)	Chris; Collins (R)	115th (2017–2019)
Lee; Zeldin (R)	Peter; King (R)	Tom; Suozzi (D)	Kathleen; Rice (D)	Gregory; Meeks (D)	Grace; Meng (D)	Nydia; Velázquez (D)	Hakeem; Jeffries (D)	Yvette; Clarke (D)	Jerry; Nadler (D)	Dan; Donovan (R)	Carolyn; Maloney (D)	Adriano; Espaillat (D)	Joe; Crowley (D)	José E. Serrano (D)	Eliot; Engel (D)	Nita; Lowey (D)	Sean; Patrick; Maloney (D)	John; Faso (R)	Paul; Tonko (D)	Elise; Stefanik (R)	Claudia; Tenney (R)	Tom; Reed (R)	John; Katko (R)	Joe; Morelle (D)	Brian; Higgins (D)	Chris; Collins (R)	115th (2017–2019)
Lee; Zeldin (R)	Peter; King (R)	Tom; Suozzi (D)	Kathleen; Rice (D)	Gregory; Meeks (D)	Grace; Meng (D)	Nydia; Velázquez (D)	Hakeem; Jeffries (D)	Yvette; Clarke (D)	Jerry; Nadler (D)	Max; Rose (D)	Carolyn; Maloney (D)	Adriano; Espaillat (D)	Alexandria; Ocasio- Cortez (D)	José E. Serrano (D)	Eliot; Engel (D)	Nita; Lowey (D)	Sean; Patrick; Maloney (D)	Antonio; Delgado (D)	Paul; Tonko (D)	Elise; Stefanik (R)	Anthony; Brindisi (D)	Tom; Reed (R)	John; Katko (R)	Joe; Morelle (D)	Brian; Higgins (D)	Chris; Collins (R)	116th (2019–2021)
Lee; Zeldin (R)	Peter; King (R)	Tom; Suozzi (D)	Kathleen; Rice (D)	Gregory; Meeks (D)	Grace; Meng (D)	Nydia; Velázquez (D)	Hakeem; Jeffries (D)	Yvette; Clarke (D)	Jerry; Nadler (D)	Max; Rose (D)	Carolyn; Maloney (D)	Adriano; Espaillat (D)	Alexandria; Ocasio- Cortez (D)	José E. Serrano (D)	Eliot; Engel (D)	Nita; Lowey (D)	Sean; Patrick; Maloney (D)	Antonio; Delgado (D)	Paul; Tonko (D)	Elise; Stefanik (R)	Anthony; Brindisi (D)	Tom; Reed (R)	John; Katko (R)	Joe; Morelle (D)	Brian; Higgins (D)	Chris; Jacobs (R)	116th (2019–2021)
Lee; Zeldin (R)	Andrew; Garbarino (R)	Tom; Suozzi (D)	Kathleen; Rice (D)	Gregory; Meeks (D)	Grace; Meng (D)	Nydia; Velázquez (D)	Hakeem; Jeffries (D)	Yvette; Clarke (D)	Jerry; Nadler (D)	Nicole; Malliotakis (R)	Carolyn; Maloney (D)	Adriano; Espaillat (D)	Alexandria; Ocasio- Cortez (D)	Ritchie; Torres (D)	Jamaal; Bowman (D)	Mondaire; Jones (D)	Sean; Patrick; Maloney (D)	Antonio; Delgado (D)	Paul; Tonko (D)	Elise; Stefanik (R)	Claudia; Tenney (R)	Tom; Reed (R)	John; Katko (R)	Joe; Morelle (D)	Brian; Higgins (D)	Chris; Jacobs (R)	117th (2021–2023)
Lee; Zeldin (R)	Andrew; Garbarino (R)	Tom; Suozzi (D)	Kathleen; Rice (D)	Gregory; Meeks (D)	Grace; Meng (D)	Nydia; Velázquez (D)	Hakeem; Jeffries (D)	Yvette; Clarke (D)	Jerry; Nadler (D)	Nicole; Malliotakis (R)	Carolyn; Maloney (D)	Adriano; Espaillat (D)	Alexandria; Ocasio- Cortez (D)	Ritchie; Torres (D)	Jamaal; Bowman (D)	Mondaire; Jones (D)	Sean; Patrick; Maloney (D)	Pat; Ryan (D)	Paul; Tonko (D)	Elise; Stefanik (R)	Claudia; Tenney (R)	Joe Sem- polinski (R)	John; Katko (R)	Joe; Morelle (D)	Brian; Higgins (D)	Chris; Jacobs (R)	117th (2021–2023)

=== 2023–present: 26 seats ===
New York lost one seat in the 2020 census.

Congress
118th
(2023–2025)
119th
(2025–2027)
120th
(2027–2029)

District																										Congress
1st	2nd	3rd	4th	5th	6th	7th	8th	9th	10th	11th	12th	13th	14th	15th	16th	17th	18th	19th	20th	21st	22nd	23rd	24th	25th	26th	Congress
Nick; LaLota (R)	Andrew; Garbarino (R)	George; Santos (R)	Anthony; D'Esposito (R)	Gregory; Meeks (D)	Grace; Meng (D)	Nydia; Velázquez (D)	Hakeem; Jeffries (D)	Yvette; Clarke (D)	Dan; Goldman (D)	Nicole; Malliotakis (R)	Jerry; Nadler (D)	Adriano; Espaillat (D)	Alexandria; Ocasio- Cortez (D)	Ritchie; Torres (D)	Jamaal; Bowman (D)	Mike; Lawler (R)	Pat; Ryan (D)	Marc; Molinaro (R)	Paul; Tonko (D)	Elise; Stefanik (R)	Brandon; Williams (R)	Nick; Langworthy (R)	Claudia; Tenney (R)	Joseph; Morelle (D)	Brian; Higgins (D)	118th (2023–2025)
Nick; LaLota (R)	Andrew; Garbarino (R)	Tom; Suozzi (D)	Anthony; D'Esposito (R)	Gregory; Meeks (D)	Grace; Meng (D)	Nydia; Velázquez (D)	Hakeem; Jeffries (D)	Yvette; Clarke (D)	Dan; Goldman (D)	Nicole; Malliotakis (R)	Jerry; Nadler (D)	Adriano; Espaillat (D)	Alexandria; Ocasio- Cortez (D)	Ritchie; Torres (D)	Jamaal; Bowman (D)	Mike; Lawler (R)	Pat; Ryan (D)	Marc; Molinaro (R)	Paul; Tonko (D)	Elise; Stefanik (R)	Brandon; Williams (R)	Nick; Langworthy (R)	Claudia; Tenney (R)	Joseph; Morelle (D)	Tim; Kennedy (D)	118th (2023–2025)
Nick; LaLota (R)	Andrew; Garbarino (R)	Tom; Suozzi (D)	Laura; Gillen (D)	Gregory; Meeks (D)	Grace; Meng (D)	Nydia; Velázquez (D)	Hakeem; Jeffries (D)	Yvette; Clarke (D)	Dan; Goldman (D)	Nicole; Malliotakis (R)	Jerry; Nadler (D)	Adriano; Espaillat (D)	Alexandria; Ocasio- Cortez (D)	Ritchie; Torres (D)	George; Latimer (D)	Mike; Lawler (R)	Pat; Ryan (D)	Josh; Riley (D)	Paul; Tonko (D)	Elise; Stefanik (R)	John; Mannion (D)	Nick; Langworthy (R)	Claudia; Tenney (R)	Joseph; Morelle (D)	Tim; Kennedy (D)	119th (2025–2027)
Nick; LaLota (R)	Andrew; Garbarino (R)	Tom; Suozzi (D)	Laura; Gillen (D)	Gregory; Meeks (D)	Grace; Meng (D)	Claire; Valdez (D)	Hakeem; Jeffries (D)	Yvette; Clarke (D)	Brad; Lander (D)	Nicole; Malliotakis (R)	Micah; Lasher (D)	Darializa; Avila Chevalier (D)	Alexandria; Ocasio- Cortez (D)	Ritchie; Torres (D)	George; Latimer (D)	Cait; Conley (D)	Pat; Ryan (D)	Josh; Riley (D)	Paul; Tonko (D)	Anthony; Constantino (D)	John; Mannion (D)	Nick; Langworthy (R)	Claudia; Tenney (R)	Joseph; Morelle (D)	Tim; Kennedy (D)	120th (2027–2029)

== Key ==
American Labor (AL)
Anti-Administration (AA)
Anti-Masonic (A-M)
Conservative (Con)
Democratic (D)
Democratic-Republican (DR)
Federalist (F)
Pro-Administration (PA)
Free Soil (FS)
Independent Democrat (ID)
Jacksonian (J)
Know Nothing (KN)
Liberal (Lib)
National Republican (NR)
Progressive (Bull Moose) (Prog)
Republican (R)
Socialist (Soc)
Union (U)
Whig (W)
Independent (I)

== See also ==
- List of United States congressional districts
- New York's congressional districts
- Political party strength in New York
