= John Rogers (New York politician) =

American politician

John Rogers (May 9, 1813 – May 11, 1879) was an American businessman and politician who served one term as a representative from New York from 1871 to 1873.

== Biography ==
Rogers was born as John Weed in Caldwell, New York (now Lake George) on May 9, 1813. He completed preparatory studies, then moved to the hamlet of Black Brook in 1832. Rogers engaged in the manufacture of iron as a partner with his half- brother James in a firm they named the J & J Rogers Iron Company. In addition to the iron works, the Rogers' enterprises in and around the hamlet of Black Brook included a sawmill and a general store. The year after John was marriage in 1843, John Weed's surname was legally changed in 1844 to John Weed Rogers, being his birth right. James and John had the same father. The town records and documents for the Town of Black Brook within the County of Clinton, New York show that correction by law where his signature clearly changes from John Weed to John Weed Rogers.

Rogers was Town Supervisor of Black Brook for ten years between 1839 and 1866 and held other local offices, including Postmaster.

=== Congress ===
He was elected as a Democrat to the Forty-second Congress (March 4, 1871 - March 3, 1873). He did not run for reelection in 1872, and resumed his business activities.

=== Death ===
He died at "Rogers Place," his estate near Fort Edward and Moreau, on May 11, 1879. He was interred in the family burial ground on his estate.

U.S. House of Representatives
Preceded by Orange Ferriss	Member of the U.S. House of Representatives from New York's 16th congressional district March 4, 1871 – March 3, 1873	Succeeded by James S. Smart
