= Benedict Arnold (New York politician) =

American politician

Member of the U.S. House of Representatives from New York's 16th district
- In office March 4, 1829 – March 3, 1831
- Preceded by: Henry Markell; Nathan Soule
- Succeeded by: Nathan Soule

Personal details
- Born: October 5, 1780 Amsterdam, New York, US
- Died: March 3, 1849 (aged 68) Amsterdam, New York, US
- Party: Anti-Jacksonian
- Spouse: Mary 'Polly' Bovee Arnold
- Children: 12
- Profession: merchant, politician, philanthropist

Benedict Arnold (October 5, 1780 – March 3, 1849) was an American politician from New York, and a member of the House of Representatives.

== Biography ==
Arnold was born in Schaghticoke, Albany County, New York (after 1791 Rensselaer County, New York), the son of Elisha and Sarah Francisco Arnold. He was named after American Revolutionary War general Benedict Arnold, at that date seen as a hero for the capture of Fort Ticonderoga and the victory at Saratoga. General Arnold had been exposed as a traitor on 24 September, just 11 days earlier, and the news had not reached the Schaghticoke area. The name was also common in the Arnold family; the first Benedict Arnold immigrated from England with his father in 1635.

Arnold attended the local schools and became a successful merchant. He married Mary 'Polly' Bovee (sister of Matthias J. Bovee) on August 21, 1806, in Amsterdam, Montgomery County, New York. They had twelve children.

== Career ==
Arnold owned large stretches of land, and was able to dedicate much time to philanthropy. As was common at the time for local magnates, he entered politics for a short period; in 1816 and 1817, he served as a member of the New York State Assembly.

In 1828, Arnold was elected to the Twenty-first United States Congress as an Anti-Jacksonian to represent the sixteenth district of New York. He served from March 4, 1829, to March 3, 1831, and did not seek reelection. He was president of the board of trustees of the village of Amsterdam in 1832 and did not engage in active business pursuits, but lived in retirement in Amsterdam, New York, until his death.

== Death ==
Arnold died in Amsterdam, Montgomery County, New York, on March 3, 1849 (age 68 years, 149 days). He is interred at Green Hill Cemetery, Amsterdam, New York.

U.S. House of Representatives
Preceded by Henry Markell	Member of the U.S. House of Representatives from New York's 16th congressional district March 4, 1829 – March 3, 1831	Succeeded by Nathan Soule
