= James S. Smart =

American politician

Member of the U.S. House of Representatives from New York's 16th district
- In office March 4, 1873 – March 3, 1875
- Preceded by: John Rogers
- Succeeded by: Charles H. Adams

Personal details
- Born: James Stevenson Smart; June 14, 1842 Baltimore, Maryland, U.S.
- Died: September 17, 1903 (aged 61) Cambridge, New York, U.S.
- Resting place: Woodland Cemetery, Cambridge, New York, U.S.
- Party: Republican
- Education: Jefferson College

James Stevenson Smart (June 14, 1842 – September 17, 1903) was a U.S. representative from New York.

== Early life ==
Born in Baltimore, Maryland on June 14, 1842, Smart moved with his parents to Coila, part of Cambridge, Washington County, New York, in 1849.

He attended Cambridge Academy and Union College in Schenectady, and graduated from Jefferson College (now Washington & Jefferson College) in Canonsburg, Pennsylvania in 1863.

While in college, Smart became a member of the Sigma Chi fraternity.

== Civil War ==
Smart entered the Union Army in January 1864 as First Lieutenant in the 16th New York Heavy Artillery Regiment.

He was promoted to Captain and commander of the regiment's Company K. The regiment took part in action in Virginia and North Carolina, including the Second Battle of Fort Fisher and he served until after the war, receiving his discharge in August 1865.

== Post Civil War ==
Smart was a newspaper writer and editor, and became publisher of the Washington County Post.

He was elected as a Republican to the Forty-third Congress (March 4, 1873 – March 3, 1875). He was not a candidate for renomination in 1874.

For many years Smart was a member of the New York Republican State Committee's central committee, and he was a Delegate to several Republican National Conventions.

In 1883 he was appointed federal Collector of Internal Revenue for New York's northern district, and he served until 1885, when he was succeeded by Samuel Tilden, Jr., the nephew of Samuel J. Tilden.

== Death and burial ==
He died in Cambridge on September 17, 1903. He was interred in Cambridge's Woodland Cemetery, Section G, Lot 50.

U.S. House of Representatives
Preceded by John Rogers	Member of the U.S. House of Representatives from New York's 16th congressional district March 4, 1873 – March 3, 1875	Succeeded by Charles H. Adams
