= New York's 16th congressional district =

U.S. House district for New York

Coordinates: 40°56′23″N 73°47′28″W

- Interactive map of district boundaries since January 3, 2025
- Representative: George Latimer; D–Rye
- Distribution: 100% urban; 0% rural
- Population (2025): 784,084
- Median household income: $106,673
- Ethnicity: 39.7% White; 28.8% Hispanic; 20.7% Black; 6.5% Asian; 3.1% Two or more races; 1.1% other
- Cook PVI: D+18

New York's 16th congressional district is a congressional district in the state of New York that is represented by Democratic Rep. George Latimer. The 16th district includes a small portion of the northern Bronx, as well as the southern portion of Westchester County.

== History ==
From 2003 to 2013, the district included the neighborhoods of Bedford Park, East Tremont, Fordham, Hunts Point, Melrose, Highbridge, Morrisania, Mott Haven and University Heights. Yankee Stadium, Fordham University and the Bronx Zoo were located within the district. In 2008, the previous version of this district gave Barack Obama his largest victory margin of any congressional district, a 90% margin (95–5%). The 2010 census found that approximately 38% of constituents in New York's 16th lived at or below the federal poverty line, the highest poverty rate of any congressional district in the nation.

== Counties, towns, and cities ==
For the 119th and successive Congresses (based on the districts drawn following the New York Court of Appeals' December 2023 decision in Hoffman v New York State Ind. Redistricting. Commn.), the district contains all or portions of the following counties, towns, and cities:

Bronx County (1)

New York (part; also 3rd, 5th, 6th, 7th, 8th, 9th, 10th, 11th, 12th, 13th, 14th, and 15th; shared with Kings, New York, Queens, and Richmond counties)

Westchester County (12)

Eastchester, Greenburgh (part; also 17th; includes Ardsley, Fairview, Dobbs Ferry, Elmsford, Greenville, Hartsdale, Hastings-on-Hudson, Irvington, and part of Tarrytown), Harrison, Mamaroneck, Mount Vernon, New Rochelle, Pelham (town), Rye (city), Rye (town), Scarsdale, White Plains, Yonkers

== Recent election results from statewide races ==
Year	Office	Results
2008	President	Obama 69% - 31%
2012	President	Obama 69% - 31%
2016	President	Clinton 70% - 26%
2016	Senate	Schumer 76% - 22%
2018	Senate	Gillibrand 76% - 24%
2018	Governor	Cuomo 72% - 25%
2018	Attorney General	James 73% - 25%
2020	President	Biden 72% - 27%
2022	Senate	Schumer 67% - 33%
2022	Governor	Hochul 64% - 36%
2022	Attorney General	James 65% - 35%
2022	Comptroller	DiNapoli 67% - 33%
2024	President	Harris 66% - 33%
2024	Senate	Gillibrand 68% - 31%

== List of members representing the district ==
Representative	Party	Years	Cong ress	Electoral history	Location
District established March 4, 1803
John Paterson (Lisle)	Democratic-Republican	March 4, 1803 – March 3, 1805	8th	Elected in 1802. Retired.	1803–1809 [data missing]
Uri Tracy (Oxford)	Democratic-Republican	March 4, 1805 – March 3, 1807	9th	Re-elected in 1804. Lost re-election.	1803–1809 [data missing]
Reuben Humphrey (Marcellus)	Democratic-Republican	March 4, 1807 – March 3, 1809	10th	Elected in 1806. [data missing]	1803–1809 [data missing]
District inactive		March 4, 1809 – March 3, 1813	11th 12th		
Morris S. Miller (Utica)	Federalist	March 4, 1813 – March 3, 1815	13th	Elected in 1812. [data missing]	1813–1823; Oneida County and the ex-Oneida part of Oswego County
Thomas R. Gold (Whitestown)	Federalist	March 4, 1815 – March 3, 1817	14th	Elected in 1814. [data missing]	1813–1823; Oneida County and the ex-Oneida part of Oswego County
Henry R. Storrs (Whitestown)	Federalist	March 4, 1817 – March 3, 1821	15th 16th	Elected in 1816. Re-elected in 1818. Lost renomination.	1813–1823; Oneida County and the ex-Oneida part of Oswego County
Vacant		March 4, 1821 – December 3, 1821	17th	Elections were held in April 1821. It is unclear when results were announced or credentials issued.	1813–1823; Oneida County and the ex-Oneida part of Oswego County
Joseph Kirkland (Utica)	Federalist	December 3, 1821 – March 3, 1823	17th	Elected in 1821. [data missing]	1813–1823; Oneida County and the ex-Oneida part of Oswego County
John W. Cady (Johnstown)	Adams-Clay; Democratic-Republican	March 4, 1823 – March 3, 1825	18th	Elected in 1822. [data missing]	1823–1833; Montgomery County
Henry Markell (Palatine)	Anti-Jacksonian	March 4, 1825 – March 3, 1829	19th 20th	Elected in 1824. Re-elected in 1826. [data missing]	1823–1833; Montgomery County
Benedict Arnold (Amsterdam)	Anti-Jacksonian	March 4, 1829 – March 3, 1831	21st	Elected in 1828. [data missing]	1823–1833; Montgomery County
Nathan Soule (Fort Plain)	Jacksonian	March 4, 1831 – March 3, 1833	22nd	Elected in 1830. [data missing]	1823–1833; Montgomery County
Abijah Mann Jr. (Fairfield)	Jacksonian	March 4, 1833 – March 3, 1837	23rd 24th	Elected in 1832. Re-elected in 1834. [data missing]	1833–1843 [data missing]
Arphaxed Loomis (Little Falls)	Democratic	March 4, 1837 – March 3, 1839	25th	Elected in 1836. [data missing]	1833–1843 [data missing]
Andrew W. Doig (Lowville)	Democratic	March 4, 1839 – March 3, 1843	26th 27th	Elected in 1838. Re-elected in 1840. [data missing]	1833–1843 [data missing]
Chesselden Ellis (Waterford)	Democratic	March 4, 1843 – March 3, 1845	28th	Elected in 1842. [data missing]	1843–1853 [data missing]
Hugh White (Cohoes)	Whig	March 4, 1845 – March 3, 1851	29th 30th 31st	Elected in 1844. Re-elected in 1846. Re-elected in 1848. [data missing]	1843–1853 [data missing]
John Wells (Johnstown)	Whig	March 4, 1851 – March 3, 1853	32nd	Elected in 1850. [data missing]	1843–1853 [data missing]
George A. Simmons (Keeseville)	Whig	March 4, 1853 – March 3, 1855	33rd 34th	Elected in 1852. [data missing]	1853–1863 [data missing]
George A. Simmons (Keeseville)	Opposition	March 4, 1855 – March 3, 1857	33rd 34th	Re-elected in 1854. [data missing]	1853–1863 [data missing]
George W. Palmer (Plattsburg)	Republican	March 4, 1857 – March 3, 1861	35th 36th	Elected in 1856. Re-elected in 1858. [data missing]	1853–1863 [data missing]
William A. Wheeler (Malone)	Republican	March 4, 1861 – March 3, 1863	37th	Elected in 1860. [data missing]	1853–1863 [data missing]
Orlando Kellogg (Elizabethtown)	Republican	March 4, 1863 – August 24, 1865	38th 39th	Elected in 1862. Re-elected in 1864. Died.	1863–1873 [data missing]
Vacant		August 24, 1865 – December 3, 1866	39th		1863–1873 [data missing]
Robert S. Hale (Elizabethtown)	Republican	December 3, 1866 – March 3, 1867	39th	Elected to finish Kellogg's term. [data missing]	1863–1873 [data missing]
Orange Ferriss (Glens Falls)	Republican	March 4, 1867 – March 3, 1871	40th 41st	Elected in 1866. Re-elected in 1868. [data missing]	1863–1873 [data missing]
John Rogers (Black Brook)	Democratic	March 4, 1871 – March 3, 1873	42nd	Elected in 1870. [data missing]	1863–1873 [data missing]
James S. Smart (Cambridge)	Republican	March 4, 1873 – March 3, 1875	43rd	Elected in 1872. [data missing]	1873–1883 [data missing]
Charles H. Adams (Cohoes)	Republican	March 4, 1875 – March 3, 1877	44th	Elected in 1874. [data missing]	1873–1883 [data missing]
Terence J. Quinn (Albany)	Democratic	March 4, 1877 – June 18, 1878	45th	Elected in 1876. Died.	1873–1883 [data missing]
Vacant		June 18, 1878 – November 5, 1878	45th		1873–1883 [data missing]
John Mosher Bailey (Albany)	Republican	November 5, 1878 – March 3, 1881	45th 46th	Elected to finish Quinn's term. Also elected the same day in 1878 to the next term. [data missing]	1873–1883 [data missing]
Michael N. Nolan (Albany)	Democratic	March 4, 1881 – March 3, 1883	47th	Elected in 1880. [data missing]	1873–1883 [data missing]
Thomas J. Van Alstyne (Albany)	Democratic	March 4, 1883 – March 3, 1885	48th	Elected in 1882. [data missing]	1883–1893 [data missing]
John H. Ketcham (Dover Plains)	Republican	March 4, 1885 – March 3, 1893	49th 50th 51st 52nd	Redistricted from the 13th district and re-elected in 1884. Re-elected in 1886. Re-elected in 1888. Re-elected in 1890. [data missing]	1883–1893 [data missing]
William Ryan (Port Chester)	Democratic	March 4, 1893 – March 3, 1895	53rd	Elected in 1892. [data missing]	1893–1903 [data missing]
Benjamin L. Fairchild (Pelham Heights)	Republican	March 4, 1895 – March 3, 1897	54th	Elected in 1894. [data missing]	1893–1903 [data missing]
William L. Ward (Port Chester)	Republican	March 4, 1897 – March 3, 1899	55th	Elected in 1896. [data missing]	1893–1903 [data missing]
John Q. Underhill (New Rochelle)	Democratic	March 4, 1899 – March 3, 1901	56th	Elected in 1898. [data missing]	1893–1903 [data missing]
Cornelius A. Pugsley (Peekskill)	Democratic	March 4, 1901 – March 3, 1903	57th	Elected in 1900. [data missing]	1893–1903 [data missing]
Jacob Ruppert (New York)	Democratic	March 4, 1903 – March 3, 1907	58th 59th	Redistricted from the 15th district and re-elected in 1902. Re-elected in 1904. [data missing]	1903–1913 [data missing]
Francis B. Harrison (New York)	Democratic	March 4, 1907 – March 3, 1913	60th 61st 62nd	Elected in 1906. Re-elected in 1908. Re-elected in 1910. Redistricted to the 20th district.	1903–1913 [data missing]
Peter J. Dooling (New York)	Democratic	March 4, 1913 – March 3, 1919	63rd 64th 65th	Elected in 1912. Re-elected in 1914. Re-elected in 1916; Redistricted to the 15th district.	1913–1933 [data missing]
Thomas F. Smith (New York)	Democratic	March 4, 1919 – March 3, 1921	66th	Redistricted from the 15th district and re-elected in 1918. [data missing]	1913–1933 [data missing]
William Bourke Cockran (New York)	Democratic	March 4, 1921 – March 1, 1923	67th	Elected in 1920. Re-elected in 1922 but died before the next term began.	1913–1933 [data missing]
Vacant		March 1, 1923 – November 6, 1923	67th 68th		1913–1933 [data missing]
John J. O'Connor (New York)	Democratic	November 6, 1923 – October 24, 1938	68th 69th 70th 71st 72nd 73rd 74th 75th	Elected to finish Cockran's term. Re-elected in 1924. Re-elected in 1926. Re-elected in 1928. Re-elected in 1930. Re-elected in 1932. Re-elected in 1934. Re-elected in 1936. Lost renomination, then lost re-election as a Republican.	1913–1933 [data missing]
John J. O'Connor (New York)	Republican	October 24, 1938 – January 3, 1939	68th 69th 70th 71st 72nd 73rd 74th 75th	Elected to finish Cockran's term. Re-elected in 1924. Re-elected in 1926. Re-elected in 1928. Re-elected in 1930. Re-elected in 1932. Re-elected in 1934. Re-elected in 1936. Lost renomination, then lost re-election as a Republican.	1933–1943 [data missing]
James H. Fay (New York)	Democratic	January 3, 1939 – January 3, 1941	76th	Elected in 1938. [data missing]	1933–1943 [data missing]
William T. Pheiffer (New York)	Republican	January 3, 1941 – January 3, 1943	77th	Elected in 1940. [data missing]	1933–1943 [data missing]
James H. Fay (New York)	Democratic	January 3, 1943 – January 3, 1945	78th	Elected in 1942. [data missing]	1943–1953 [data missing]
Ellsworth B. Buck (Staten Island)	Republican	January 3, 1945 – January 3, 1949	79th 80th	Redistricted from the 11th district and re-elected in 1944. Re-elected in 1946. [data missing]	1943–1953 [data missing]
James J. Murphy (Staten Island)	Democratic	January 3, 1949 – January 3, 1953	81st 82nd	Elected in 1948. Re-elected in 1950. [data missing]	1943–1953 [data missing]
Adam Clayton Powell Jr. (New York)	Democratic	January 3, 1953 – January 3, 1963	83rd 84th 85th 86th 87th	Redistricted from the 22nd district and re-elected in 1952. Re-elected in 1954. Re-elected in 1956. Re-elected in 1958. Re-elected in 1960. Redistricted to the 18th district.	1953–1963 [data missing]
John M. Murphy (Staten Island)	Democratic	January 3, 1963 – January 3, 1973	88th 89th 90th 91st 92nd	Elected in 1962. Re-elected in 1964. Re-elected in 1966. Re-elected in 1968. Re-elected in 1970. Redistricted to the 17th district.	1963–1973 [data missing]
Elizabeth Holtzman (Brooklyn)	Democratic	January 3, 1973 – January 3, 1981	93rd 94th 95th 96th	Elected in 1972. Re-elected in 1974. Re-elected in 1976. Re-elected in 1978. Retired to run for U.S. Senator.	1973–1983 [data missing]
Chuck Schumer (Brooklyn)	Democratic	January 3, 1981 – January 3, 1983	97th	Elected in 1980. Redistricted to the 10th district.	1973–1983 [data missing]
Charles Rangel (New York)	Democratic	January 3, 1983 – January 3, 1993	98th 99th 100th 101st 102nd	Redistricted from the 19th district and re-elected in 1982. Re-elected in 1984. Re-elected in 1986. Re-elected in 1988. Re-elected in 1990. Redistricted to the 15th district.	1983–1993 [data missing]
José E. Serrano (The Bronx)	Democratic	January 3, 1993 – January 3, 2013	103rd 104th 105th 106th 107th 108th 109th 110th 111th 112th	Redistricted from the 18th district and re-elected in 1992. Re-elected in 1994. Re-elected in 1996. Re-elected in 1998. Re-elected in 2000. Re-elected in 2002. Re-elected in 2004. Re-elected in 2006. Re-elected in 2008. Re-elected in 2010. Redistricted to the 15th district.	1993–2003 [data missing]
José E. Serrano (The Bronx)	Democratic	January 3, 1993 – January 3, 2013	103rd 104th 105th 106th 107th 108th 109th 110th 111th 112th	Redistricted from the 18th district and re-elected in 1992. Re-elected in 1994. Re-elected in 1996. Re-elected in 1998. Re-elected in 2000. Re-elected in 2002. Re-elected in 2004. Re-elected in 2006. Re-elected in 2008. Re-elected in 2010. Redistricted to the 15th district.	2003–2013; Parts of the Bronx and Queens
Eliot Engel (The Bronx)	Democratic	January 3, 2013 – January 3, 2021	113th 114th 115th 116th	Redistricted from the 17th district and re-elected in 2012. Re-elected in 2014. Re-elected in 2016. Re-elected in 2018. Lost renomination.	2013–2023; Parts of the Bronx and Westchester County
Jamaal Bowman (Yonkers)	Democratic	January 3, 2021 – January 3, 2025	117th 118th	Elected in 2020. Re-elected in 2022. Lost renomination.	2013–2023; Parts of the Bronx and Westchester County
Jamaal Bowman (Yonkers)	Democratic	January 3, 2021 – January 3, 2025	117th 118th	Elected in 2020. Re-elected in 2022. Lost renomination.	2023–2025; Parts of the Bronx and Westchester County
George Latimer (Rye)	Democratic	January 3, 2025 – present	119th	Elected in 2024. Re-elected in 2026.	2025–present Parts of the Bronx and Westchester County

== Recent election results ==
In New York State electoral politics there are numerous minor parties at various points on the political spectrum. Certain parties will invariably endorse either the Republican or Democratic candidate for every office, hence the state electoral results contain both the party votes, and the final candidate votes (Listed as "Recap").

1996 election
Party	Candidate	Votes	%	±%
Democratic	José E. Serrano (incumbent)	95,568	96.3%	
Republican	Rodney Torres	2,878	2.9%	
Conservative	Owen Camp	787	0.8%	
Majority		92,690	93.4%	
Turnout		99,233	100%	

1998 election
Party	Candidate	Votes	%	±%
Democratic	José E. Serrano (incumbent)	67,367	95.4%	−0.9%
Republican	Thomas W. Bayley Jr.	2,457	3.5%	+0.6%
Conservative	Owen Camp	756	1.1%	+0.3%
Majority		64,910	92.0%	−1.4%
Turnout		70,580	100%	−28.9%

2000 election
Party	Candidate	Votes	%	±%
Democratic	José E. Serrano (incumbent)	103,041	95.8%	+0.4%
Republican	Aaron Justice	3,934	3.7%	+0.2%
Conservative	Richard Retcho	571	0.5%	−0.6%
Majority		99,107	92.2%	+0.2%
Turnout		107,546	100%	+52.4%

2002 election
Party	Candidate	Votes	%	±%
Democratic	José E. Serrano (incumbent)	50,716	92.1%	−3.7%
Republican	Frank DellaValle	4,366	7.9%	+4.2%
Majority		46,350	84.1%	−8.1%
Turnout		55,082	100%	−48.8%

2004 election
Party	Candidate	Votes	%	±%
Democratic	José E. Serrano	106,739	91.0%	
Working Families	José E. Serrano	4,899	4.2%	
total	José E. Serrano (incumbent)	111,638	95.2	+3.1%
Republican	Ali Mohamed	4,917	4.2%	
Conservative	Ali Mohamed	693	0.6%	
total	Ali Mohamed	5,610	4.8	−3.1%
Majority		106,028	90.4	+6.3
Turnout		117,248	100	+112.9%

2006 election
Party	Candidate	Votes	%	±%
Democratic	José E. Serrano	53,179	90.3%	
Working Families	José E. Serrano	2,945	5.0%	
total	José E. Serrano (incumbent)	56,124	95.3	+0.1%
Republican	Ali Mohamed	2,045	3.5%	
Conservative	Ali Mohamed	714	1.2%	
total	Ali Mohamed	2,759	4.7	−0.1%
Majority		53,365	90.6	+0.2
Turnout		58,883	100%	−49.8%

2008 election
Party	Candidate	Votes	%	±%
Democratic	José E. Serrano	123,312	93.7%	
Working Families	José E. Serrano	3,867	2.9%	
total	José E. Serrano (incumbent)	127,179	96.6	+1.3%
Republican	Ali Mohamed	3,941	3.0%	
Conservative	Ali Mohamed	547	0.4%	
total	Ali Mohamed	4,488	3.4	−1.3%
Majority		122,691	93.2	+2.6
Turnout		131,667	100%	+123.6%

2010 election
Party	Candidate	Votes	%	±%
Democratic	José E. Serrano	58,478	90.8%	
Working Families	José E. Serrano	3,164	4.9%	
total	José E. Serrano (incumbent)	61,642	95.7	−0.9%
Republican	Frank Della Valle	2,257	3.5%	
Conservative	Frank Della Valle	501	0.8%	
total	Frank Della Valle	2,758	4.3	+0.9%
Majority		58,884	91.4	−1.8
Turnout		64,400	100%	−51.1%

2018 New York District 16 primary
Party	Candidate	Votes	%	±%
Democratic	Eliot Engel (Incumbent)	22,160	73.7	−26.7
Democratic	Jonathan Lewis	4,866	16.2	New
Democratic	Joyce Briscoe	1,772	5.9	New
Democratic	Derickson Lawrence	1,280	4.3	New
Majority		30,078	57.5	−26.7

2018 general election
Party	Candidate	Votes	%	±%
Democratic	Eliot Engel (Incumbent)	182,044	100.0	+5.7
Majority		182,044	100.0	+5.7

2020 Democratic primary
Party	Candidate	Votes	%	±%
Democratic	Jamaal Bowman	49,367	55.4	
Democratic	Eliot Engel (Incumbent)	36,149	40.6	
Democratic	Chris Fink	1,625	1.8	
Democratic	Sammy Ravelo	1,139	1.3	
Democratic	Andom Ghebreghiorgis (withdrawn)	761	0.9	

2020 general election
Party	Candidate	Votes	%
Democratic	Jamaal Bowman	218,471	84.2
Conservative	Patrick McManus	41,085	15.8
Total votes		259,556	100.0
Democratic hold			

2022 Democratic primary
Party	Candidate	Votes	%	±%
Democratic	Jamaal Bowman (incumbent)	21,643	54.2	
Democratic	Vedat Gashi	10,009	25.0	
Democratic	Catherine Parker	7,503	18.8	
Democratic	Mark Jaffee	608	1.5	
Total votes		39,961	100.0	

2022 general election
Party	Candidate	Votes	%
Democratic	Jamaal Bowman	127,024	61.1
Working Families	Jamaal Bowman	6,543	3.2
Total	Jamaal Bowman (incumbent)	133,567	64.2
Republican	Miriam Flisser	74,156	35.7
Total votes		207,928	100.0
Democratic hold			

2024 Democratic primary
Party	Candidate	Votes	%	±%
Democratic	George Latimer	45,909	58.6	
Democratic	Jamaal Bowman (incumbent)	32,440	41.4	
Total votes		78,349	100.0	

2024 New York's 16th congressional district election
Party	Candidate	Votes	%
Democratic	George Latimer	217,668	71.6
Republican	Miriam Flisser	86,408	28.4
Total votes		304,076	100.0
Democratic hold			

== See also ==
- List of United States congressional districts
- New York's congressional delegations
- New York's congressional districts

== Sources ==
=== Books ===
- Martis, Kenneth C. (1989). The Historical Atlas of Political Parties in the United States Congress. New York: Macmillan Publishing Company.
- Martis, Kenneth C. (1982). The Historical Atlas of United States Congressional Districts. New York: Macmillan Publishing Company.
