= George William Palmer (New York politician) =

American politician

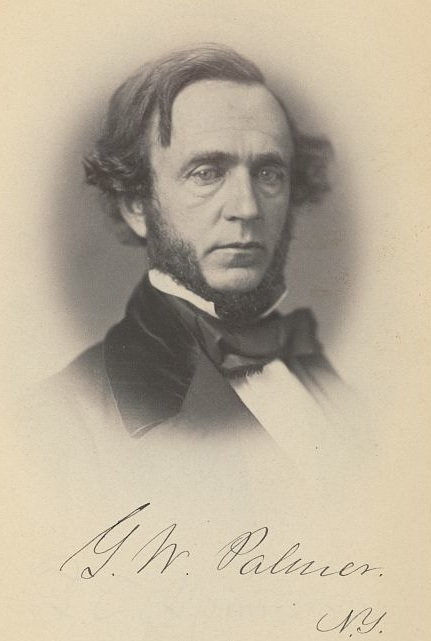

Member of the U.S. House of Representatives from New York's 16th district
- In office March 4, 1857 – March 3, 1861
- Preceded by: George A. Simmons
- Succeeded by: William A. Wheeler

Member of the New York State Assembly from the Clinton County district
- In office January 1, 1885 – December 31, 1886
- Preceded by: William E. Smith
- Succeeded by: George S. Weed

Personal details
- Born: January 13, 1818 Hoosick, New York
- Died: March 13, 1916 (aged 98) Plattsburgh, New York
- Education: Schodack Academy, Yale College
- Profession: lawyer

George William Palmer (January 13, 1818 – March 12, 1916) was a United States representative from New York. Born in Hoosick, he attended the common schools, the Schodack Academy and Yale College. He studied law, was admitted to the bar about 1840 and commenced practice in Plattsburgh. He was surrogate of Clinton County, New York.

Palmer was elected as a Republican to the Thirty-fifth and Thirty-sixth Congresses (March 4, 1857 – March 3, 1861); while in Congress he was chairman of the Committee on Expenditures in the Post Office Department (Thirty-sixth Congress). He was not a candidate for renomination in 1860, and was a delegate to the Republican National Convention at Baltimore in 1864. He was appointed United States Consul to Crete by President Abraham Lincoln and was United States judge on the International Court for Suppression of Slave Trade on the West Coast of Africa from 1866 to 1870, when he resigned. He was a member of the New York State Assembly (Clinton Co.) in 1885 and 1886. He engaged in iron manufacturing at Clinton, New York. He died in Plattsburgh in 1916; interment was in Riverside Cemetery.

George William Palmer was a nephew of John Palmer, a U.S. Representative from New York, and a cousin of William Elisha Haynes, a U.S. Representative from Ohio.

U.S. House of Representatives
Preceded by George A. Simmons	Member of the U.S. House of Representatives from New York's 16th congressional district 1857–1861	Succeeded by William A. Wheeler
New York State Assembly
Preceded by William E. Smith	New York State Assembly; Clinton County; 1885–1886	Succeeded by George S. Weed
