= William L. Ward =

American politician

William Lukens Ward
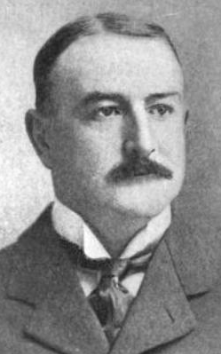

Member of the U.S. House of Representatives from New York
- In office March 4, 1897 – March 3, 1899
- Preceded by: Benjamin L. Fairchild
- Succeeded by: John Q. Underhill
- Constituency: 16th district

Member of the Republican National Committee from New York
- In office June 21, 1904 – June 23, 1912
- Preceded by: George R. Sheldon
- Succeeded by: William Barnes Jr.

Personal details
- Born: September 2, 1856 Greenwich, Connecticut, U.S.
- Died: July 16, 1933 (aged 76) New York City, U.S.
- Resting place: Kensico Cemetery, Valhalla, New York
- Spouse: Madge Leland (m. 1880)
- Children: 4
- Education: Columbia School of Mines
- Occupation: Manufacturer

William Lukens Ward (September 2, 1856 – July 16, 1933) was an American manufacturer and politician from New York. A longtime Republican activist, he was most notable for his service as a member of the United States House of Representatives from 1897 to 1899.

== Biography ==
William L. Ward was born in Pemberwick, part of the town of Greenwich, Connecticut on September 2, 1856, the son of William E. Ward and Louise (Lukens) Ward. His family moved to Port Chester, New York in 1863. He attended Friends Seminary in New York City, and the Columbia School of Mines (class of 1878). Ward pursued a business career as owner of an enterprise that manufactured bolts, nuts, and rivets in Port Chester.

Ward was a presidential elector in the 1896 presidential election. In 1896, he was elected to the United States House of Representatives; he served in the 55th Congress (March 4, 1897 – March 3, 1899). Ward was not a candidate for reelection in 1898. After his term ended, Ward resumed his former manufacturing pursuits in Port Chester.

He served as member of the Republican National Committee from 1904 to 1912. He was a delegate to the 1904, 1908, 1912, 1916, 1920, 1924, 1928, and 1932 Republican National Conventions.

Ward died at Mount Sinai Hospital in New York City, July 16, 1933. He was interred in the family mausoleum at Kensico Cemetery in Valhalla, New York.

== Sources ==
- United States Congress. "William L. Ward (id: W000144)". Biographical Directory of the United States Congress.

U.S. House of Representatives
Preceded by Benjamin L. Fairchild	Member of the U.S. House of Representatives from New York's 16th congressional district 1897–1899	Succeeded by John Q. Underhill
