= John W. Cady =

American lawyer and politician

Member of the U.S. House of Representatives from New York's 16th district
- In office March 4, 1823 – March 3, 1825
- Preceded by: Joseph Kirkland
- Succeeded by: Henry Markell

Member of the New York State Assembly for Hamilton and Montgomery Counties
- In office July 1, 1821 – December 31, 1822

Personal details
- Born: John Watts Cady; June 28, 1790 Florida, New York
- Died: January 5, 1854 (aged 63) Johnstown, New York
- Party: Adams-Clay Democratic-Republican
- Spouse: Maria Caroline Livingston (m. 1813; died 1836)
- Children: 4
- Education: Union College
- Occupation: Lawyer

John Watts Cady (June 28, 1790 – January 5, 1854) was an American lawyer and politician from New York.

== Early life ==
Cady was born in Florida, Montgomery County, New York on June 28, 1790. He was one of eight children born to Ann (née Shuler) Cady and David Cady, who served in the American Revolutionary War as a Commissioner (or Paymaster) for service and was present at the surrender of John Burgoyne. Judge Daniel Cady, also a member of the U.S. House of Representatives, was his uncle.

Cady attended school at the Old Stone Manse at Fort Hunter, and graduated from Union College in 1808, thereafter studying law.

== Career ==
After being admitted to the bar, Cady commenced practice in Johnstown, then the county seat of Montgomery County.

Cady was Town Clerk of Johnstown in 1814, 1816 and 1817; and a supervisor of Montgomery County from 1818 to 1822, and from 1826 to 1829. He was a member of the 45th New York State Legislature serving in the New York State Assembly from July 1, 1821, to December 31, 1822.

In November 1822, Cady was elected as an Adams-Clay Democratic-Republican to the 18th United States Congress, holding office from March 4, 1823, to March 4, 1825. Afterwards, he resumed the practice of law at Johnstown. In 1838, Fulton County was split from Montgomery County, and Johnstown became the seat of the new county. Cady was District Attorney of Fulton County from 1840 to 1846.

He was Justice of the Peace of Johnstown in 1853.

== Personal life ==
On October 18, 1813, he was married to Maria Caroline Livingston (1794–1833), the daughter of Beeckman Livingston and Catherine (née Marsh) Livingston. Maria was also the aunt of New York State Engineer and Surveyor Jonas Platt Goodsell. Together, they were the parents of:

- Livingston Cady (1816–1846)
- David B. Cady (1820–1895)
- Anna Cady (b. 1822), who married Frederick Avery Pomeroy.
- John Watts Cady, Jr. (1825–1859), who married Marianne Haines (d. 1892)

Cady died on January 5, 1854, in Johnstown, Fulton County, New York. He was buried at the Johnstown Cemetery.

U.S. House of Representatives
Preceded by Joseph Kirkland	Member of the U.S. House of Representatives from New York's 16th congressional district 1823–1825	Succeeded by Henry Markell
