= Henry Markell =

American politician

Member of the U.S. House of Representatives from New York's 16th district
- In office March 4, 1825 – March 3, 1829
- Preceded by: John W. Cady
- Succeeded by: Benedict Arnold

Personal details
- Born: February 7, 1792 Palatine, New York, U.S.
- Died: August 30, 1831 (aged 39) Palatine, New York, U.S.
- Parent: Jacob Markell (father)
- Profession: Politician, lawyer

Henry Markell (February 7, 1792 Stone Arabia, Montgomery County, New York – August 30, 1831 Palatine, Montgomery Co., NY) was an American lawyer and politician from New York.

== Life ==
He was the son of Congressman Jacob Markell (1770–1852). He attended the common schools, studied law, was admitted to the bar and practiced.

Markell was elected as an Adams man to the 19th and 20th United States Congresses, holding office from March 4, 1825, to March 3, 1829.

At the time of his death, he practiced at Oppenheim, and was buried at the cemetery in the area which in 1838 was separated from Oppenheim as the Town of St. Johnsville.

== Sources ==
- United States Congress. "Henry Markell (id: M000131)". Biographical Directory of the United States Congress.
- The New York State Register for 1831 by Edwin Williams (page 268)

U.S. House of Representatives
Preceded by John W. Cady	Member of the U.S. House of Representatives from New York's 16th congressional district 1825–1829	Succeeded by Benedict Arnold
