= George A. Simmons =

American politician

George Abel Simmons

Chair of the House Judiciary Committee
- In office March 4, 1855 – March 3, 1857
- Preceded by: Frederick P. Stanton
- Succeeded by: George S. Houston

Member of the United States House of Representatives from New York's 16th district
- In office March 4, 1853 – March 3, 1857
- Preceded by: John Wells
- Succeeded by: George W. Palmer

Member of the New York State Assembly from Essex County
- In office January 1, 1840 – December 31, 1842
- Preceded by: Gideon Hammond
- Succeeded by: Samuel Shumway

Personal details
- Born: September 8, 1791 Lyme, New Hampshire
- Died: October 27, 1857 (aged 66) Keesville, New York
- Party: Whig
- Education: Dartmouth College

George Abel Simmons (September 8, 1791 – October 27, 1857) was a U.S. representative from New York.

== Biography ==
Born in Lyme, New Hampshire, Simmons attended the district school. He was graduated from Dartmouth College, Hanover, New Hampshire, in 1816. He moved to Lansingburgh, New York, and was principal of the local academy. He studied law. He was admitted to the bar in 1825 and commenced practice in Keeseville, New York. He served as member of the state assembly in 1840–1842. He served as member of the state constitutional convention in 1846.

Simmons was elected as a Whig to the Thirty-third Congress and reelected to the Thirty-fourth Congress (March 4, 1853 – March 3, 1857). He served as chairman of the Committee on the Judiciary (Thirty-fourth Congress). He was not a candidate for reelection in 1856. He resumed the practice of his profession in Keeseville, New York, where he died October 27, 1857. He was interred in Evergreen Cemetery.

== Sources ==
- United States Congress. "George A. Simmons (id: S000416)". Biographical Directory of the United States Congress.

U.S. House of Representatives
Preceded by John Wells	Member of the U.S. House of Representatives from New York's 16th congressional district 1853–1857	Succeeded by George W. Palmer
