= Thomas R. Gold =

American politician

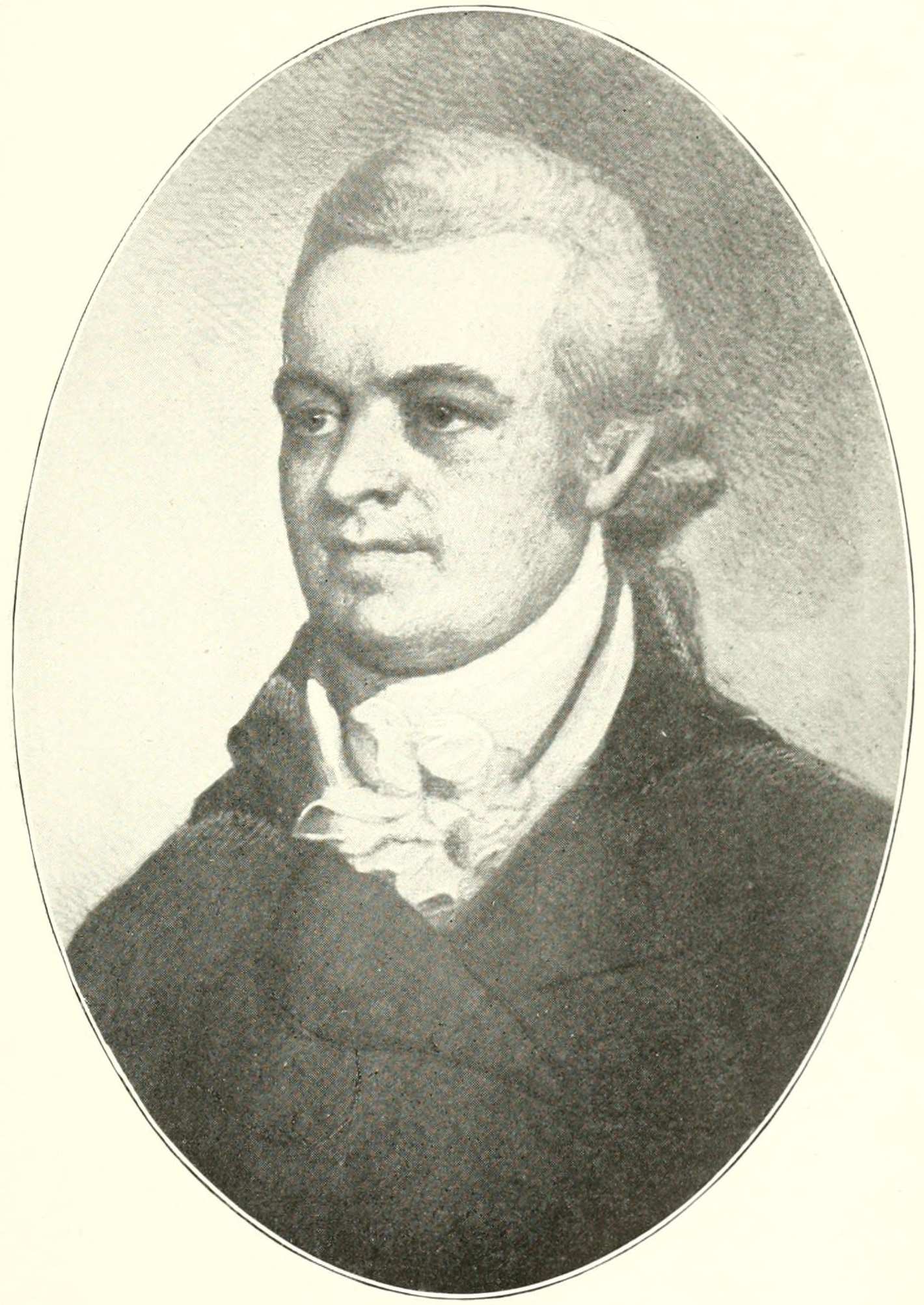
Thomas Ruggles Gold, New York Congressman.

Thomas Ruggles Gold (November 4, 1764 – October 24, 1827) was a United States representative from New York.

== Biography ==
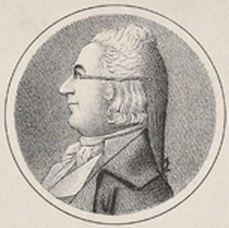
Thomas Ruggles Gold, New York Congressman

Born in Cornwall, Connecticut, he pursued classical studies and was graduated from Yale College in 1786. He studied law, was admitted to the bar and commenced practice in Goshen, Connecticut. He settled in Whitesboro, Oneida County, New York, in 1792 and was assistant New York attorney general from 1797 to 1801. He was a member of the New York State Senate from 1796 to 1802 and was an unsuccessful candidate for election in 1804 to the Ninth Congress. He served in the New York State Assembly in 1808 and was elected as a Federalist to the Eleventh and Twelfth Congresses, holding office from March 4, 1809, to March 3, 1813. He was an unsuccessful candidate for reelection in 1812 to the Thirteenth Congress, and was elected to the Fourteenth Congress, holding office from March 4, 1815, to March 3, 1817. He was not a candidate for renomination in 1816 and resumed the practice of law in Whitesboro, where he died in 1827. His interment was in Grand View Cemetery.

U.S. House of Representatives
Preceded by John Thompson	Member of the U.S. House of Representatives from New York's 11th congressional district 1809–1813	Succeeded by John W. Taylor
Preceded by Morris S. Miller	Member of the U.S. House of Representatives from New York's 16th congressional district 1815–1817	Succeeded by Henry R. Storrs
