= Philip B. Low =

American politician (1836–1912)

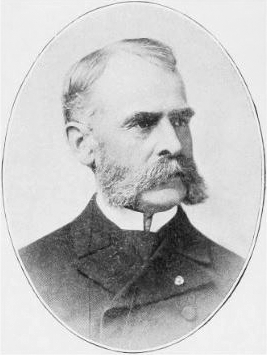

Member of the U.S. House of Representatives from New York's 15th district
- In office March 4, 1895 – March 3, 1899
- Preceded by: Isidor Straus
- Succeeded by: Jacob Ruppert

Personal details
- Born: Philip Burrill Low; May 6, 1836 Chelsea, Massachusetts, U.S.
- Died: August 23, 1912 (aged 76) New York City, U.S.
- Resting place: Woodlawn Cemetery
- Party: Republican
- Profession: Politician

Military service
- Allegiance: United States
- Branch/service: United States Navy
- Years of service: 1862–1863
- Rank: Ensign (acting)
- Battles/wars: American Civil War

Philip Burrill Low (May 6, 1836 – August 23, 1912) was a U.S. representative from New York.

Born in Chelsea, Massachusetts, Low attended the public schools and was graduated from high school. During the Civil War volunteered and was appointed acting ensign in the United States Navy and served in the North Atlantic Squadron during 1862 and 1863. He resigned and engaged in commercial pursuits in Boston, Massachusetts, until 1865, when he moved to New York City. Identified with the shipping and maritime interests.

Low was elected as a Republican to the Fifty-fourth and Fifty-fifth Congresses (March 4, 1895 – March 3, 1899). He was an unsuccessful candidate for reelection in 1898 to the Fifty-sixth Congress. He continued his activities in maritime pursuits in New York City until his death there on August 23, 1912. He was interred in Woodlawn Cemetery.

== Sources ==
- United States Congress. "Philip B. Low (id: L000471)". Biographical Directory of the United States Congress.

U.S. House of Representatives
Preceded by Isidor Straus	Member of the U.S. House of Representatives from New York's 15th congressional district 1895–1899	Succeeded by Jacob Ruppert
