= John Q. Underhill =

American politician

John Quincy Underhill
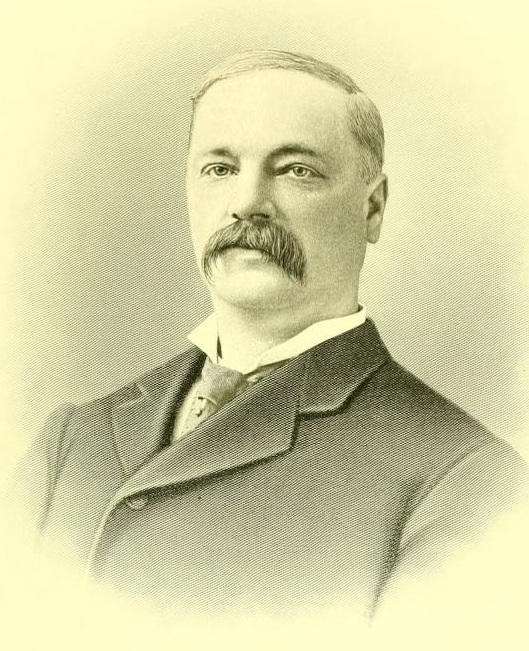

Member of the U.S. House of Representatives from New York's 16th district
- In office March 4, 1899 – March 3, 1901
- Preceded by: William L. Ward
- Succeeded by: Cornelius A. Pugsley

Personal details
- Born: February 19, 1848 New Rochelle, New York, U.S.
- Died: May 21, 1907 (aged 59) New Rochelle, New York, U.S.
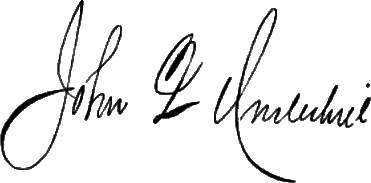
- Signature

John Quincy Underhill (February 19, 1848 – May 21, 1907) was a U.S. representative from New York, representing the state's 16th congressional district.

Born in New Rochelle, New York, Underhill attended private and public schools and the College of the City of New York.

He worked in the insurance business, joining the Westchester Fire Insurance Co. as a clerk in 1869, and rising to become vice president and treasurer of the company in 1892.

He became village trustee of New Rochelle in 1877, was elected village president in 1878 and was reelected in 1880. He also served as town auditor and was a member of the board of education for several years.

Underhill was elected as a Democrat to the Fifty-sixth Congress in 1898, in which year he was the only Democrat to be elected from Westchester County. He entered Congress on March 4, 1899, and served one term. He was not a candidate for renomination in 1900, retiring from both business and politics when his term ended on March 3, 1901.

He died from heart disease in New Rochelle on May 21, 1907, and was interred in Beechwoods Cemetery.

U.S. House of Representatives
Preceded by William L. Ward	Member of the U.S. House of Representatives from New York's 16th congressional district 1899–1901	Succeeded by Cornelius A. Pugsley
