= Abijah Mann Jr. =

American politician (1793–1868)

Member of the U.S. House of Representatives from New York's 16th district
- In office March 4, 1833 – March 3, 1837
- Preceded by: Nathan Soule
- Succeeded by: Arphaxed Loomis

Postmaster of Fairfield, New York
- In office May 28, 1830 – January 16, 1833

Member of the New York State Assembly from Herkimer County
- In office January 1, 1838 – December 31, 1838 Serving with Volney Owen
- Preceded by: Henry L. Easton and Aaron Hackley Jr.
- Succeeded by: Benjamin Carver and Atwater Cooke Jr.
- In office January 1, 1828 – December 31, 1830 Serving with David R. Carrier (1928); John P. Snell (1828); John B. Dygert (1829); Cornelius Sloughter (1829); Frederick P. Bellinger (1830); Russel Hopkins (1830)
- Preceded by: Daniel C. Henderson and Richard Smith 2d
- Succeeded by: Atwater Cooke Jr., Holmstead Hough, Nicholas Lawyer

Personal details
- Born: September 24, 1793 Fairfield, New York, U.S.
- Died: September 6, 1868 (aged 74) Auburn, New York, U.S.
- Party: Jacksonian
- Relatives: Charles A. Mann (brother); Matthew D. Mann (nephew)
- Occupation: Politician

Abijah Mann Jr. (September 24, 1793 – September 6, 1868) was an American politician who served two terms as a U.S. representative from New York from 1833 to 1837.

== Early life ==
Born in Fairfield, New York, Mann attended the common schools. He engaged in mercantile pursuits and was a justice of the peace. He was appointed by President Andrew Jackson as Postmaster of Fairfield and served from May 28, 1830, to January 16, 1833. He was a member of the New York State Assembly in 1828, 1829, 1830 and 1838.

=== Congress ===
Mann was elected as a Jacksonian to the 23rd and 24th United States Congresses, holding office from March 4, 1833, to March 3, 1837.

=== Later career ===
He moved to New York City. He was an unsuccessful candidate for Attorney General of New York at the New York state election, 1855. He was a delegate to the Republican state convention in 1856. He was an unsuccessful candidate for the State Senate in 1857.

=== Death ===
He died in Auburn, New York, September 6, 1868.

=== Family ===
State Senator Charles A. Mann (1803–1860) was his brother; Dr. Matthew Derbyshire Mann (1845–1921) was his nephew.

== Sources ==
- United States Congress. "Abijah Mann Jr. (id: M000099)". Biographical Directory of the United States Congress.

U.S. House of Representatives
Preceded by Nathan Soule	Member of the U.S. House of Representatives from New York's 16th congressional district 1833–1837	Succeeded by Arphaxed Loomis
