= Andrew W. Doig =

American politician (1799–1875)

Member of the U.S. House of Representatives from 's 16th district
- In office March 4, 1839 – March 3, 1843
- Preceded by: Arphaxed Loomis
- Succeeded by: Chesselden Ellis

New York State Assembly
- In office 1832

Personal details
- Born: Andrew Wheeler Doig; July 24, 1799 Salem, New York
- Died: July 17, 1866 (aged 66) Brooklyn, New York
- Resting place: Rural Cemetery, Lowville, New York
- Party: Democratic

Andrew Wheeler Doig (July 24, 1799 – July 11, 1875) was an American businessman and politician who served two terms as a U.S. representative from New York from 1839 to 1843.

== Biography ==
Born in Salem, New York, Doig pursued an academic course. He moved to Lowville, New York, and engaged in mercantile pursuits. He served as town clerk of Lowville in 1825, and as county clerk of Lewis County from 1825 to 1831. He was a member of the New York State Assembly in 1832. He moved to Martinsburg, New York, in 1833. He worked as the Cashier of the Lewis County Bank in 1833 and 1834. He returned to Lowville, where he served as surrogate of Lewis County from 1835 to 1840.

=== Tenure in Congress ===
Doig was elected as a Democrat to the Twenty-sixth and Twenty-seventh Congresses (March 4, 1839 – March 3, 1843). He represented the Sixteenth District of New York both times.

=== Later career ===
He served as member of the board of directors and vice president of the Bank of Lowville from 1843 to 1847. He moved to California in 1849 and engaged in mining. He returned in 1850 to Lowville, New York, where he resided until late in life. He served as clerk in the Customs House, New York City, from 1853 to 1857.

=== Death and burial ===
He died in Brooklyn, New York, July 11, 1875. He was interred in the Rural Cemetery, Lowville, New York.

New York State Assembly
Preceded by Harrison Blodget	New York State Assembly; Lewis County; 1832	Succeeded by Eli Rogers Jr.
U.S. House of Representatives
Preceded by Arphaxed Loomis	Member of the U.S. House of Representatives from New York's 16th congressional district 1839–1843	Succeeded by Chesselden Ellis
