= Morris S. Miller =

American politician

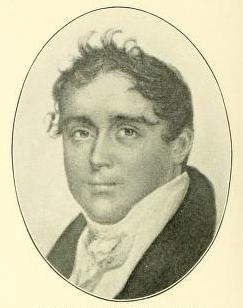

Member of the U.S. House of Representatives from New York's 16th district
- In office March 4, 1813 – March 3, 1815
- Preceded by: District restored
- Succeeded by: Thomas R. Gold

Personal details
- Born: Morris Smith Miller; July 31, 1779 New York City, U.S.
- Died: November 16, 1824 (aged 45) Utica, New York, U.S.
- Resting place: Albany Rural Cemetery
- Party: Federalist
- Education: Union College
- Profession: Politician

Morris Smith Miller (July 31, 1779 – November 16, 1824) was a United States representative from New York.

== Life ==
Born in New York City, he graduated from Union College in 1798. He studied law, and was admitted to the bar. Miller served as private secretary to Governor John Jay, and subsequently, in 1806, commenced the practice of law in Utica. He was President of the Village of Utica in 1808; and judge of the court of common pleas of Oneida County from 1810 until his death in 1824.

Miller was elected as a Federalist to the 13th United States Congress, holding office from March 4, 1813 to March 3, 1815. He represented the United States Government at the negotiation of a treaty between the Seneca Indians and the proprietors of the Seneca Reservation at Buffalo, New York in July 1819.

He died on November 16, 1824, in Utica, New York; and was buried at the Albany Rural Cemetery. He was later re-interred at Forest Hill Cemetery in Utica.

U.S. House of Representatives
Preceded by District restored	Member of the U.S. House of Representatives from New York's 16th congressional district 1813–1815	Succeeded by Thomas R. Gold
