= Henry R. Storrs =

American politician (1787–1837)

Member of the U.S. House of Representatives from New York's 14th district
- In office March 4, 1823 – March 3, 1831
- Preceded by: Alfred Conkling
- Succeeded by: Samuel Beardsley

Member of the U.S. House of Representatives from New York's 16th district
- In office March 4, 1817 – March 3, 1821
- Preceded by: Thomas R. Gold
- Succeeded by: Joseph Kirkland

Personal details
- Born: Henry Randolph Storrs; September 3, 1787 Middletown, Connecticut, U.S.
- Died: July 29, 1837 (aged 49) New Haven, Connecticut, U.S.
- Resting place: Grove Street Cemetery, New Haven, Connecticut, U.S.
- Party: Federalist
- Relatives: William L. Storrs (brother)
- Education: Yale College
- Occupation: Politician, lawyer

Henry Randolph Storrs (September 3, 1787 – July 29, 1837) was a U.S. representative from New York, brother of William Lucius Storrs.

Born in Middletown, Connecticut, Storrs was graduated from Yale College in 1804. He studied law. He was admitted to the bar in 1807 and commenced practice in Champion, New York. Later practiced in Whitesboro and Utica, New York.

Storrs was elected as a Federalist to the Fifteenth and Sixteenth Congresses (March 4, 1817 – March 4, 1821). He was an unsuccessful candidate for renomination in 1820.

Storrs was elected as an Adams-Clay Federalist to the Eighteenth Congress, re-elected as an Adams candidate to the Nineteenth and Twentieth Congresses and elected as an Anti-Jacksonian to the Twenty-first Congress (March 4, 1823 – March 4, 1831). He served as chairman of the Committee on Naval Affairs (Nineteenth Congress). He was one of the impeachment managers appointed by the House of Representatives in 1830 to conduct the impeachment proceedings against James H. Peck, United States judge for the district of Missouri.

While Andrew Jackson attempted to break treaties with Indians in 1830, Storrs condemned Jackson's actions as a dangerous course, explaining "If the friends of State rights propose to sanction the violation of these Indian treaties, they must bear him out to the full extent of this thoughtless usurpation." Storrs adamantly pointed out how republicans could act like monarchies and oppress others, and that America would be confirming this truth by its own example. Presiding judge of the court of common pleas of Oneida County 1825–1829. He moved to New York City and practiced law. He died in New Haven, Connecticut, July 29, 1837 and was interred in Grove Street Cemetery.

== Sources ==
- United States Congress. "Henry R. Storrs (id: S000976)". Biographical Directory of the United States Congress.

U.S. House of Representatives
Preceded by Thomas R. Gold	Member of the U.S. House of Representatives from New York's 16th congressional district 1817–1821	Succeeded by Joseph Kirkland
Preceded by Alfred Conkling	Member of the U.S. House of Representatives from New York's 14th congressional district 1823–1831	Succeeded by Samuel Beardsley
