= Hugh White (New York politician) =

American politician

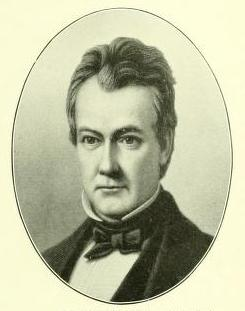

Member of the U.S. House of Representatives from New York's 16th district
- In office March 4, 1845 – March 3, 1851
- Preceded by: Chesselden Ellis
- Succeeded by: John Wells

Chairman of the United States House Committee on Agriculture
- In office 1847–1849
- Preceded by: Joseph H. Anderson
- Succeeded by: Nathaniel Littlefield

Personal details
- Born: December 25, 1798 Whitestown, New York, U.S.
- Died: October 6, 1870 (aged 71) Waterford, New York, U.S.
- Party: Whig
- Relatives: Canvass White (brother)
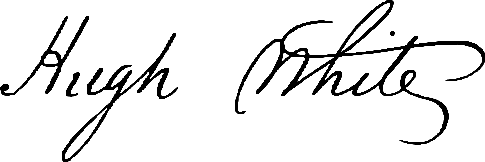
- Signature

Hugh White (December 25, 1798 – October 6, 1870) was an American businessman and politician from New York.

== Life ==
Hugh White was born in Whitestown, New York on December 25, 1798. He was the grandson of Hugh White, the founder and namesake of Whitestown. White attended the common schools. He graduated from Hamilton College in 1823. Then he studied law but did not practice. Instead, he entered business at Chittenango in 1825, and afterwards at Rondout. He was active in the building of the Michigan Southern and Northern Indiana Railroad.

He moved to Cohoes in 1830. He was greatly interested in the development of water power from the Mohawk River. He established the Rosendale Cement Works.

White was elected as a Whig to the 29th, 30th and 31st United States Congresses, holding office from March 4, 1845, to March 3, 1851. He was Chairman of the Committee on Agriculture (30th Congress). Afterwards, he resumed his business activities.

== Education ==
White worked on his father's farm until his 21st birthday, sporadically attending common schools until he attended Hamilton College, from which he graduated in 1825.

White studied law but did not practice. Instead, he turned his efforts towards business.

== Business ==
White took over the manufacture of water-lime cement that he operated with his brother at Chittenango. "White's water-proof cement" was the first made in America; it was afterwards produced at Rondout in Ulster County. Upon completion of the Erie Canal in 1825, business was moved from Chittenango to Waterford. Its location at Waterford allowed him and many others to take advantage of the water power and transportation facilities.

In addition to establishing the Rosendale Cement Works with his brother Canvass White, which he managed for a time due to Canvass' frail health condition, Hugh White was involved in many business ventures. With Rosendale Cement Works, he manufactured cement that was used on the Croton Aqueduct. White also ran a sawmill in Cohoes, the Shatemuck Flouring Mill in Northside, and nearby, the hydraulic cement mill, using Mohawk River power.

== Homestead ==
Shortly after marrying, he and his wife settled into the White Homestead on Saratoga Avenue in Waterford, New York. It was built by Joshua Clark, a builder of many homes, mills and public housing in Cohoes, from brick and timber that White had prepared at Chittenango and shipped to this area on the Erie Canal. It was an example of architecture of the period of transition from Federal to Greek Revival. His homestead was set back from the road and surrounded by an ornate fence; on the property was a small brick building by the gate that was used as an office and behind the house stood a three-story brick barn for carriages and horses.

Since its partial demolition and relocation in 1964, the White homestead has since been relocated to Waterford, New York, where it has now been transformed into a museum dedicated to Hugh White and the Erie Canal.

== Death ==
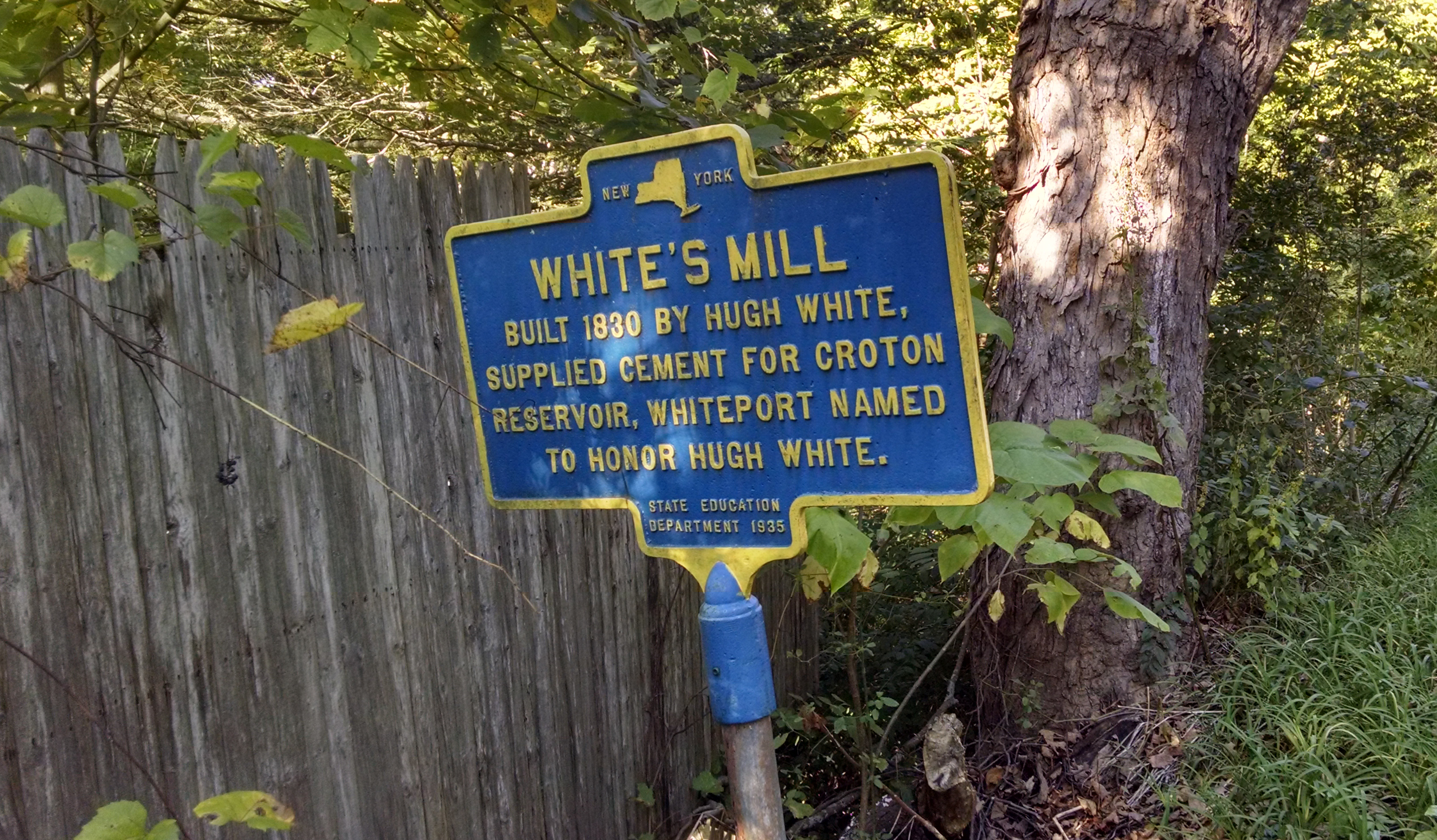
Historical marker for White's Mill on Whiteport Road in Bloomington, New York

White spent the remainder of his days at his homestead, classifying himself as a farmer in the 1855 census despite his ongoing business endeavors in the railroad industry and acting as a financier and President of the Saratoga County National Bank.

He died at his home in Waterford on October 6, 1870. His obituary in the Cohoes Cataract declared:

He was essentially an executive man; what he undertook he always accomplished, for he was a man of strong, indomitable will; he was generous and large-hearted in all his dealings... Many young men have been started on in the world by his kindness and his means, which he often used very freely in such cases.

White's funeral service was held at the Presbyterian Church of Waterford and he is buried at the family plot in Albany Rural Cemetery.

U.S. House of Representatives
Preceded by Chesselden Ellis	Member of the U.S. House of Representatives from New York's 16th congressional district 1845–1851	Succeeded by John Wells
