= Chesselden Ellis =

American politician

Chesselden Ellis (1808 – May 10, 1854) was an American lawyer and politician who served one term as a United States representative from New York from 1843 to 1845.

== Biography ==
Born in New Windsor, Vermont, he completed preparatory studies and was graduated from Union College in Schenectady in 1823. He studied law with John Cramer, was admitted to the bar in 1829 and commenced practice in Waterford, New York.

=== Early political career ===
He was elected district attorney of Saratoga County and served from April 25, 1837, until September 11, 1843.

=== Congress ===
Ellis was elected as a Democrat to the 28th Congress, holding office from March 4, 1843, to March 3, 1845. He was an unsuccessful candidate for reelection in 1844 and resumed the practice of law in Waterford.

=== Later career and death ===
He moved to New York City in 1845 and continued the practice of his profession until his death there on May 10, 1854. Interment was in Waterford Rural Cemetery.

U.S. House of Representatives
Preceded by Andrew W. Doig	Member of the U.S. House of Representatives from New York's 16th congressional district 1843–1845	Succeeded by Hugh White
