= Charles H. Adams (New York politician) =

American politician

Charles Henry Adams
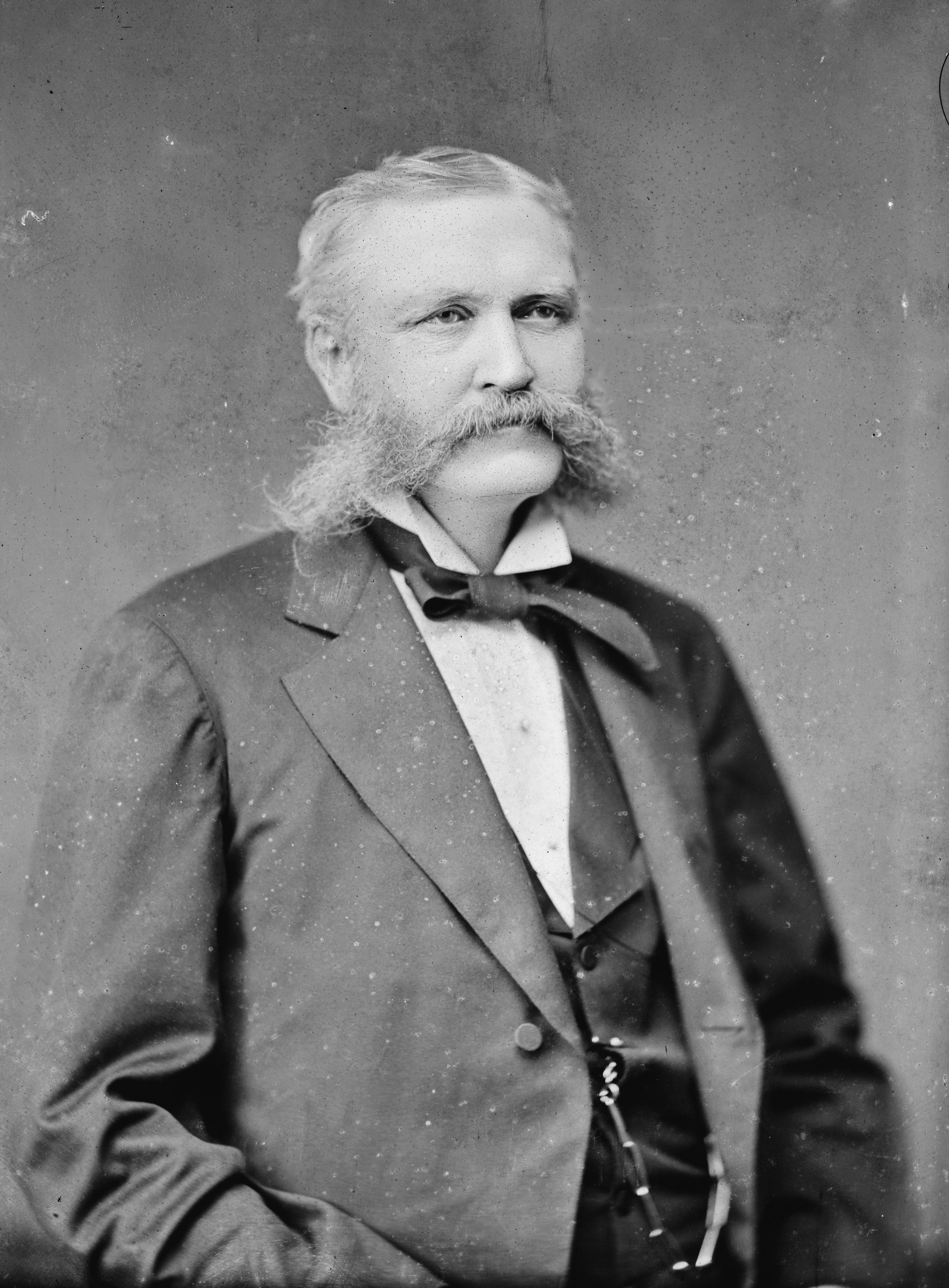

Member of the U.S. House of Representatives from New York's 16th district
- In office March 4, 1875 – March 3, 1877
- Preceded by: James S. Smart
- Succeeded by: Terence J. Quinn

Member of the New York Senate from the 13th district
- In office January 1, 1872 – December 31, 1873
- Preceded by: A. Bleecker Banks
- Succeeded by: Jesse C. Dayton

Member of the New York State Assembly from the 4th district
- In office January 1, 1858 – December 31, 1858
- Preceded by: Franklin Townsend
- Succeeded by: Lorenzo D. Collins

Personal details
- Born: April 10, 1824 Coxsackie, New York
- Died: December 15, 1902 (aged 78) Manhattan, New York County, New York
- Citizenship: United States
- Party: Republican
- Spouse: Elizabeth Platt Adams
- Children: 3
- Profession: Manufacturer, attorney, politician

Military service
- Allegiance: United States of America
- Years of service: 1851
- Rank: colonel
- Unit: Governor Washington Hunt's staff

Charles Henry Adams (April 10, 1824 – December 15, 1902) was an American politician, a manufacturer, an attorney, and a U.S. Representative from New York, serving one term from 1875 to 1877.

== Biography ==
Born in Coxsackie, New York, Adams attended the public schools, studied law, was admitted to the bar about 1845, and commenced practice in New York City. He married Elizabeth Platt and they had three children, Sarah, Mary, and William.

== Career ==
Adams moved to Cohoes in 1850 and in 1851 was appointed with rank of colonel to Governor Washington Hunt's staff in 1851. He was a Know Nothing member of the New York State Assembly (Albany County, 4th District) in 1858.

Having engaged in the manufacture of knit underwear and in banking, Adams retired from the active world of commerce in 1870 and served as first Mayor of Cohoes, New York from 1870 to 1872. He was a delegate to the 1872 Republican National Convention in Philadelphia and a member of the New York State Senate (13th District) in 1872 and 1873. He was United States commissioner from New York to the Vienna Exposition in 1873.

=== Congress ===
Adams was elected as a Republican to the forty-fourth Congress, holding office as U. S. Representative for New York's sixteenth district from March 4, 1875, to March 3, 1877. He was an unsuccessful candidate for renomination in 1876 and resumed banking in Cohoes until 1892, when he retired and moved to New York City.

=== Death ===
Adams died on December 15, 1902, in Manhattan, New York City; and was buried at the Woodlawn Cemetery in the Bronx.

New York State Assembly
Preceded by Franklin Townsend	New York State Assembly; Albany County, 4th District; 1858	Succeeded by Lorenzo D. Collins
New York State Senate
Preceded by A. Bleecker Banks	New York State Senate; 13th District; 1872–1873	Succeeded by Jesse C. Dayton
U.S. House of Representatives
Preceded by James S. Smart	Member of the U.S. House of Representatives from New York's 16th congressional district 1875–1877	Succeeded by Terence J. Quinn
