= George S. Weed =

American politician

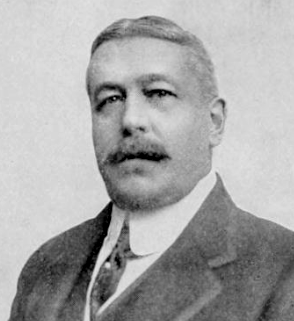

Member of the New York State Assembly
- In office 1887–1888
- Constituency: Clinton County

Personal details
- Born: George Standish Weed; February 13, 1862 Plattsburgh, New York, U.S.
- Died: January 18, 1920 (aged 57) Washington, D.C., U.S.
- Party: Democratic
- Education: Harvard University
- Occupation: Lawyer, politician

George Standish Weed (February 13, 1862 - January 18, 1920) was an American lawyer and politician from New York.

== Biography ==
George Standish Weed was born February 13, 1862, in Plattsburgh, New York, the son of Assemblyman Smith M. Weed and Caroline (Standish) Weed. He graduated from Harvard University in 1886.

He was a member of the New York State Assembly (Clinton Co.) in 1887 and 1888. He was Judge of the Clinton County Court from 1889 to 1890. He was appointed by President Grover Cleveland as Collector of the Port of Lake Champlain in 1895, and remained in office until 1898. He was Deputy New York Superintendent of State Prisons under John B. Riley, and was Acting Warden of Sing Sing in 1914.

He died on January 18, 1920, in Washington, D.C.

New York State Assembly
Preceded by George W. Palmer	New York State Assembly; Clinton County; 1887-1888	Succeeded by Stephen Moffitt
