= Benjamin N. Huntington =

American farmer, banker, and politician

Member of the New York Senate from the 19th district
- In office January 1 1851 – December 31, 1853
- Preceded by: Charles A. Mann
- Succeeded by: Daniel G. Dorrance

Member of the New York State Assembly from the Oneida County, 3rd district
- In office January 1 1866 – December 31, 1866
- Preceded by: Thomas D. Penfield
- Succeeded by: George H. Sanford

Personal details
- Born: May 5, 1816 Rome, New York, USA
- Died: November 10, 1882 (aged 66) Rome, New York, USA
- Resting place: Rome Cemetery, Rome, NY
- Party: Republican

Benjamin Nicoll Huntington (May 5, 1816 – November 10, 1882) was an American farmer, banker, and politician from New York.

Born in Rome, New York, Huntington was a son of businessman and politician Henry Huntington and Catharine M. Havens. His grandfather was congressman Benjamin Huntington, and his uncles were congressman Jonathan Nicoll Havens and assemblyman Gurdon Huntington.

Huntington was a farmer. From 1863 to 1876, he was president of the Utica bank, later known as the First National Bank of Utica.

In 1851, Huntington was elected supervisor of Rome. Later that year, he was elected to the New York State Senate as a Whig to fill a vacancy, representing New York's 19th State Senate district. He served in 1851, and was then elected to a full term and sat in the Senate in 1852 and 1853. While in the Senate, he was a member of the Court of Impeachment for the trial of Canal Commissioner John C. Mather. He was a presidential elector for the 1860 presidential election. In 1865, he was elected to the New York State Assembly as a Republican, representing the Oneida County 3rd District. He served in the Assembly in 1866. He was also a trustee of Rome for two years. He was a member of the 1867 New York State Constitutional Convention.

Huntington was president of the Oneida County Agricultural Society in 1850 and the New York State Agricultural Society in 1860. In 1855, he married Mabel Limbrieck. They had one surviving son, Henry.

Huntington died at home on November 10, 1882. He was buried in Rome Cemetery.

New York State Senate
Preceded by Charles A. Mann	New York State Senate; 19th District; 1851–1853	Succeeded by Daniel G. Dorrance
New York State Assembly
Preceded by Thomas D. Penfield	New York State Assembly; Oneida County, 3rd District; 1866	Succeeded by George H. Sanford
