= Joseph Kirkland (politician) =

American politician (1770–1844)

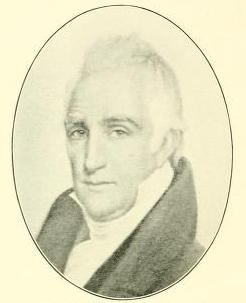

1st & 3rd Mayor of Utica
- In office 1834–1836
- Preceded by: Henry Seymour
- Succeeded by: John H. Ostrom
- In office 1832–1833
- Preceded by: Position established
- Succeeded by: Henry Seymour

Member of the U.S. House of Representatives from New York's 16th district
- In office March 4, 1821 – March 3, 1823
- Preceded by: Henry R. Storrs
- Succeeded by: John W. Cady

Personal details
- Born: January 18, 1770 Newent Society, Connecticut Colony, British America (now Lisbon)
- Died: January 26, 1844 (aged 74) Utica, New York, U.S.
- Resting place: Forest Hill Cemetery
- Party: Federalist
- Spouse: Sarah Backus
- Children: 12
- Relatives: Samuel Kirkland
- Education: Yale College

Joseph Kirkland (January 18, 1770 – January 26, 1844) was an American politician and attorney who served as the first and third mayor of Utica, New York from 1832 to 1833 and from 1834 to 1836. A member of the Federalist Party, he represented New York in the U.S. House of Representatives from 1821 to 1823.

== Early life and career ==
Joseph Kirkland was born on January 18, 1770, in present-day Lisbon, Connecticut. Kirkland graduated from Yale College in 1790, where he studied law. The nephew of Samuel Kirkland, he later moved to New Hartford, New York to be closer to his uncle. Kirkland was admitted to the bar in 1794 and commenced practice in the town.

Kirkland was a member of the New York State Assembly, where he represented Oneida County in the 27th, 28th, 41st, 44th, and 48th New York State Legislatures. In 1813, Kirkland moved to Utica and served as the District Attorney for the Sixth District of New York until 1816.

Kirkland was elected to one term in the U.S. House of Representatives, representing New York's 16th district in the 17th United States Congress from 1821 to 1823.

== Mayor of Utica ==
Per Utica's charter, citizens of the city would elect twelve council-members, who would then appoint a mayor to a one-year term. In March 1832, members of Utica's common council appointed Kirkland as the newly incorporated city's first mayor.

During his first term, Kirkland presided over an Asiatic cholera outbreak that had spread throughout North America. Upon receiving word that the outbreak had spread to Albany, Kirkland and the city council established a board of health and appointed a city health official. Resolutions were passed that required home, store, and stable owners to purify their properties, and temporary hospitals were set up throughout the city.

The city's board of health reported that the pandemic had spread to the city in August. Schools, churches, and businesses were subsequently closed, and over 3,000 residents fled the city, over a third of the city's population at the time. The outbreaks caused 65 deaths out of 206 reported cases. By September, the board of health declared that the pandemic was over.

Kirkland's first term as mayor ended in 1833, after the city council appointed Henry Seymour as his successor. He was later appointed to two more terms as the city's third mayor in 1834 and 1835.

== Personal life ==
Kirkland was married to Sarah Backus, with whom he had twelve children. Kirkland died on January 26, 1844, in Utica, New York. He is buried at Forest Hill Cemetery.

Legal offices
Preceded by Nathan Williams	District Attorney of the Sixth District; 1813–1816	Succeeded by Thomas H. Hubbard
U.S. House of Representatives
Preceded by Henry R. Storrs	Member of the U.S. House of Representatives from New York's 16th congressional district 1821–1823	Succeeded by John W. Cady
