= John Wells (New York politician) =

American politician

Member of the U.S. House of Representatives from New York's 16th district
- In office March 4, 1851 – March 3, 1853
- Preceded by: Hugh White
- Succeeded by: George A. Simmons

Personal details
- Born: July 1, 1817
- Died: May 30, 1877 (aged 59)

John Wells (July 1, 1817 – May 30, 1877) was a United States representative from New York. He was born in Johnstown on July 1, 1817. He attended Johnstown Academy, and graduated from Union College in 1835. He studied law, was admitted to the bar, and commenced practice in Palmyra. He returned to Johnstown and continued the practice of law, was elected judge of Fulton County and served from June 1847 until his resignation in December 1851, having been elected to Congress.

Wells was elected as a Whig to the Thirty-second Congress (March 4, 1851 – March 3, 1853). He declined to be a candidate for reelection in 1852 to the Thirty-third Congress, resumed the practice of law and also engaged in literary pursuits. He died in Johnstown on May 30, 1877, with interment in Johnstown Cemetery.

U.S. House of Representatives
Preceded by Hugh White	Member of the U.S. House of Representatives from New York's 16th congressional district 1851–1853	Succeeded by George A. Simmons
