= Charles A. Mann =

American lawyer and politician (1803–1860)

Charles Addison Mann

Member of the New York State Senate
- In office 1850 – April 17, 1851
- Preceded by: Thomas E. Clark
- Succeeded by: Benjamin N. Huntington

Member of the New York State Assembly
- In office 1840–1840

Personal details
- Born: January 16, 1803 Fairfield, New York, U.S.
- Died: January 19, 1860 (aged 57) Utica, New York, U.S.
- Spouse: Emma Bagg
- Children: Matthew D. Mann
- Relatives: Abijah Mann Jr. (brother)

Charles Addison Mann (January 16, 1803 Fairfield, Herkimer County, New York – January 19, 1860 Utica, Oneida County, New York) was an American lawyer and politician from New York.

== Life ==
He was the son of Abijah Mann (1761–1856) and Levina (Ford) Mann (1768–1813).

He married Emma Bagg (1813–1887), and removed to Utica, his wife's hometown. They had several children, among them Dr. Matthew Derbyshire Mann (1845–1921) who was one of the physicians who treated President William McKinley after he was shot in 1901.

He was a member of the New York State Assembly (Oneida Co.) in 1840.

He was a member of the New York State Senate (19th D.) in 1850 and 1851. He was among the 12 state senators who resigned on April 17, 1851, to prevent a quorum in the Senate.

Congressman Abijah Mann Jr. (1793–1868) was his brother.

== Sources ==
- The New York Civil List compiled by Franklin Benjamin Hough (pages 136, 143, 223 and 290; Weed, Parsons and Co., 1858)
- Mann family transcribed from This Green and Pleasant Land, Fairfield, NY by Jane Dieffenbacher, Fairfield Town Historian (1999), at NY Gen Web
- The Descendants of Mathew Martine Forde by Scott William Barker (Vol. I; 2011; pg. 90)

New York State Senate
Preceded by Thomas E. Clark	New York State Senate; 19th District; 1850–1851	Succeeded by Benjamin N. Huntington
