= Jacob Markell =

American politician

Jacob Markell (May 8, 1770 – November 26, 1852) was a U.S. representative from New York, father of Henry Markell.

Born in Schenectady County, New York, Markell attended the common schools. He moved to Manheim in 1790 and engaged in agricultural pursuits. He was the Justice of the Peace. Supervisor of the town of Manheim 1797–1819 and 1824–1829. He served as judge of the court of common pleas of Montgomery County.

Markell was elected as a Federalist to the Thirteenth Congress (March 4, 1813 – March 3, 1815). He served as member of the State assembly from Herkimer County in 1820. He died in Manheim, New York, November 26, 1852. He was interred in Snells Bush Cemetery, Manheim, New York.

== Sources ==
- United States Congress. "Jacob Markell (id: M000132)". Biographical Directory of the United States Congress.

U.S. House of Representatives
| Preceded by Daniel Avery | Member of the U.S. House of Representatives from New York's 14th congressional district 1813–1815 | Succeeded by Daniel Cady |
