= Jacob Ruppert =

American businessman, politician (1867–1939)

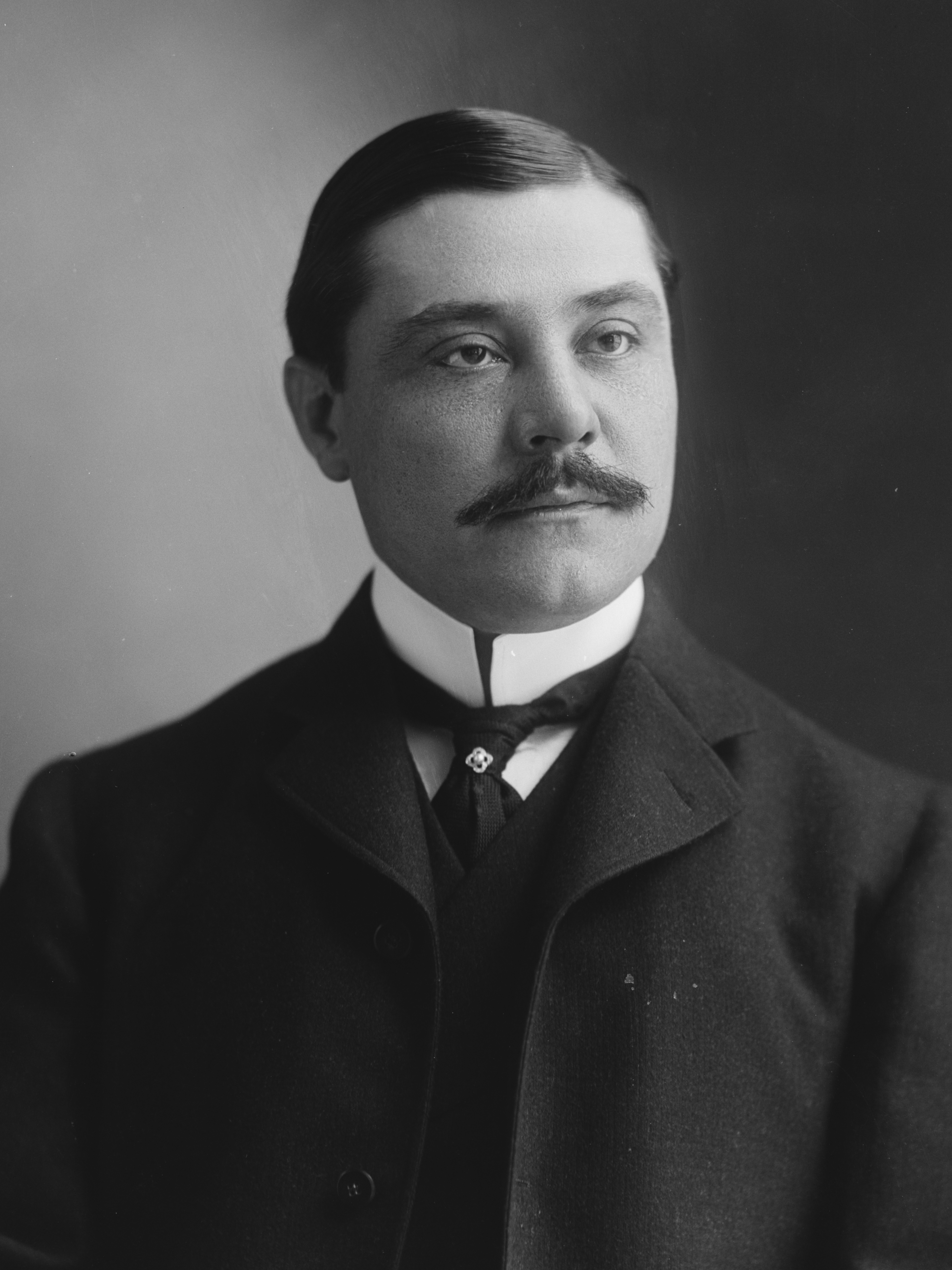
- Ruppert c. 1894–1901

Member of the U.S. House of Representatives from New York
- In office March 4, 1899 – March 3, 1907
- Preceded by: Philip B. Low
- Succeeded by: Francis Burton Harrison
- Constituency: 15th district (1899–1903); 16th district (1903–07)

Personal details
- Born: Jacob Ruppert Jr. August 5, 1867 New York City, U.S.
- Died: January 13, 1939 (aged 71) New York City, U.S.
- Party: Democratic
- Occupation: Businessman (brewing, baseball)

Military service
- Branch/service: New York Army National Guard
- Years of service: 1886–95
- Rank: Colonel
- Unit: 7th New York Infantry
- Baseball career

Member of the National

Baseball Hall of Fame
- Induction: 2013
- Vote: 93.8%
- Election method: Pre-Integration Era Committee

Jacob Ruppert Jr. (August 5, 1867 – January 13, 1939) was an American brewer, businessman, National Guard colonel and politician who served for four terms representing New York in the United States House of Representatives from 1899 to 1907. He also owned the New York Yankees of Major League Baseball from 1915 until his death in 1939.

Starting out in the family brewing business, Ruppert entered the 7th Regiment of the New York National Guard in 1886 at the age of 19, eventually reaching the rank of colonel. While he was the owner of the Yankees, he purchased the contract of Babe Ruth and built Yankee Stadium, reversing the franchise's fortunes and establishing it as the premier club in the major leagues. Ruppert was inducted into the National Baseball Hall of Fame in July 2013.

== Early life ==
Ruppert was born in New York City, the son of brewer Jacob Ruppert Sr. and his wife, Anna Ruppert (née Gillig). He was the second oldest of six children. His mother was also of German ethnicity and was the daughter of prominent brewer George Gillig. Although he was a second-generation American, he spoke with a noticeable German accent all his life.

Ruppert grew up in the Jacob Ruppert Sr. House on Fifth Avenue. Jacob Jr. attended the Columbia Grammar School. He was accepted into Columbia College, but instead began working in the brewing business with his father in 1887. He started as a barrel washer, working 12-hour days for $10 a week ($358 in 2025), and eventually became vice president and general manager of the brewery.

In 1886, Ruppert enlisted in the Seventh Regiment, National Guard of New York, serving in the rank of private through 1889. In 1890, he was promoted to colonel and appointed to serve on the staff of David B. Hill, the governor of New York, serving as aide-de-camp. He became a senior aide on the staff of Roswell P. Flower, Hill's successor as governor, until 1895.

== Career ==
=== Political and business career ===
In the 1898 elections, Ruppert was elected to the United States House of Representatives as a member of the Democratic Party to the 56th United States Congress, defeating incumbent Philip B. Low of the Republican Party in New York's 15th congressional district. He was supported in his election by Richard Croker, the political boss of Tammany Hall. Ruppert won reelection over Alderman Elias Goodman in 1900. Ruppert was renominated for Congress, this time running in New York's 16th congressional district, in 1902. Ruppert was not a candidate for reelection in 1906, and he left office in 1907.

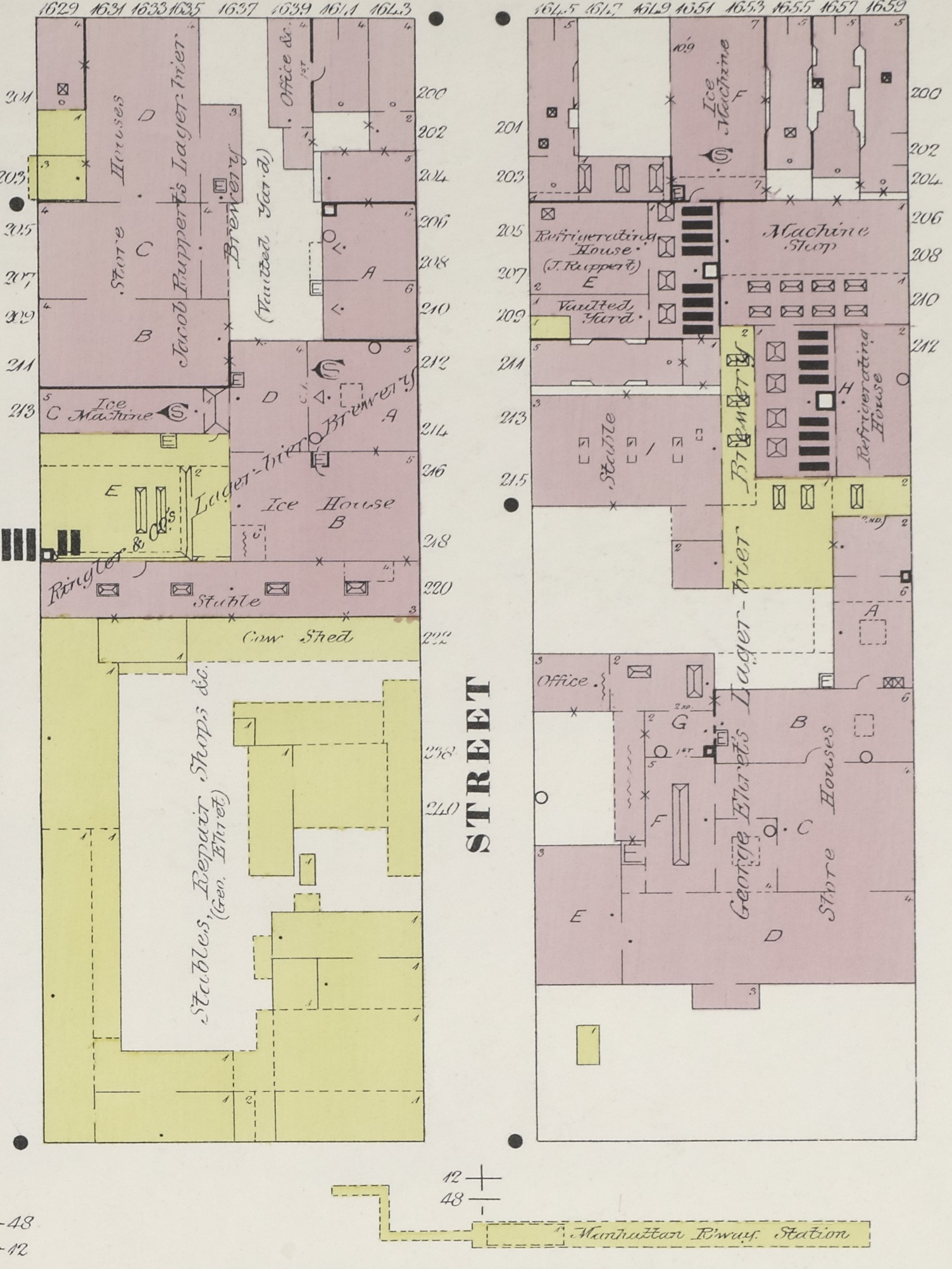
Jacob Ruppert Brewery (top left) at the corner of Third Avenue and East 91st Street in 1896 map

Ruppert was also president of the Astoria Silk Works and the United States Brewers' Association from 1911 through 1914. In January 1914, his father bought J&M Haffen Brewing Company for $700,000 ($22,500,000 in 2025), intending to close the brewery down and develop the property, which was located near The Hub in the Bronx.

Upon his father's death in 1915, Ruppert inherited the Jacob Ruppert Brewing Company and became the company's president. Ruppert also owned real estate, including Pass-a-Grille Key in Florida.

In the 1920s, the building on Third Avenue and East 74th Street on Manhattan's Upper East Side that was to later house the restaurant J.G. Melon became a tavern of the local Jacob Ruppert Brewery to dispense its own products as an illicit speakeasy during Prohibition.

=== Baseball ===
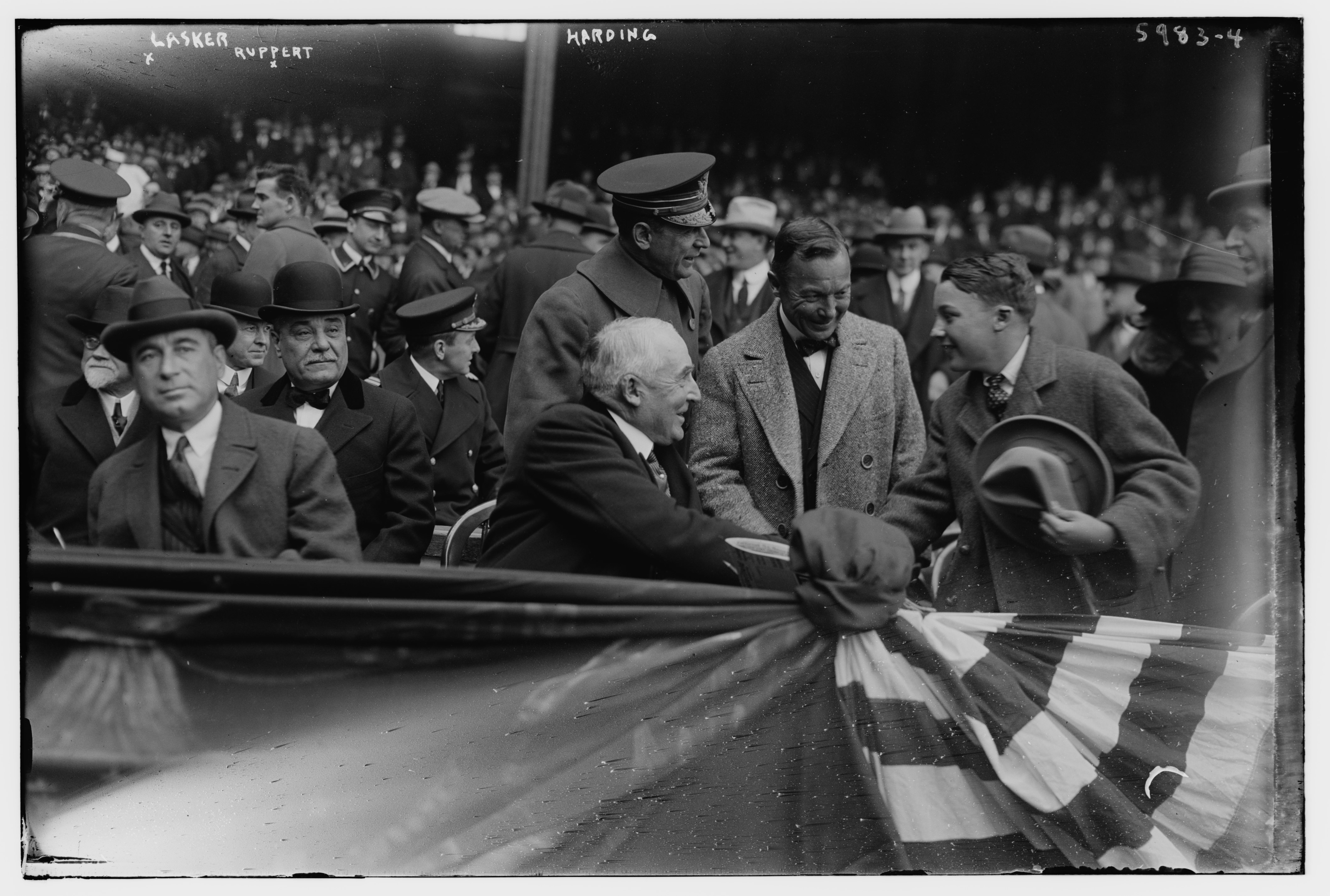
Ruppert (second row, second from left) with Albert Lasker and US President Warren G. Harding at Yankee Stadium in 1923

Ruppert, interested in baseball since his childhood, began to pursue ownership of a Major League Baseball team and attempted to purchase the New York Giants on numerous occasions. In 1912, he was offered an opportunity to purchase the Chicago Cubs but decided that Chicago was too far away from New York for his tastes. However, Frank J. Farrell and William S. Devery, owners of the New York Yankees, were looking to sell their franchise. Ruppert and Tillinghast L'Hommedieu Huston, a former United States Army engineer and colonel, purchased the Yankees from Farrell and Devery before the 1915 season for $480,000 ($15,276,316 in 2025). The Yankees were, at that time, a perennial also-ran in the American League (AL), posting winning records in only 4 of their 12 seasons – and only once since 1906 – since relocating to New York prior to the 1903 season from Baltimore, where the team had played as the Orioles during the AL's first two years of operation, 1901 and 1902.

After the 1917 season, Ban Johnson, president of the AL, suggested that Ruppert hire St. Louis Cardinals manager Miller Huggins to take over the same position with the Yankees. Huston, who was then in Europe serving as an engineer in World War 1, disliked Huggins and wanted to hire the manager of the National League's crosstown Brooklyn Robins, Wilbert Robinson, his hunting and drinking buddy. However, Ruppert interviewed Huggins on Johnson's recommendation and agreed that Huggins would be an excellent choice. Ruppert offered the job to Huggins, who accepted and signed a two-year contract. The hiring of Huggins drove a wedge between the two co-owners that culminated in Huston selling his shares of the team to Ruppert in 1922.

Ruppert and Huston purchased pitcher Carl Mays from the Boston Red Sox in 1918, in direct opposition of an order issued by Johnson. The matter was taken to court, where Ruppert and Huston prevailed over Johnson. The case led to the dissolution of the National Commission, which governed baseball and helped lead to the creation of the Commissioner of Baseball. Ruppert eventually organized opposition to Johnson among other AL owners.

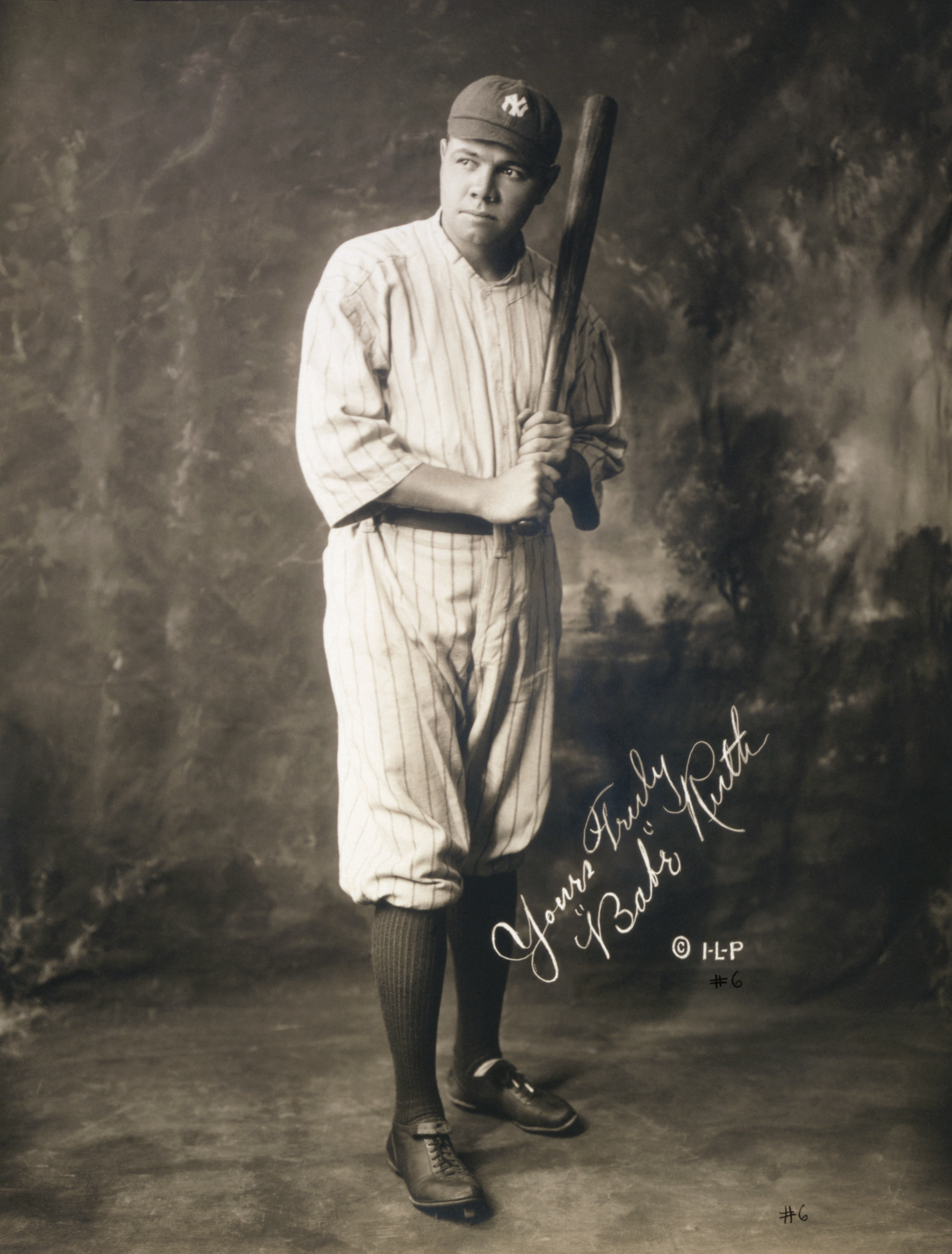
Slugger Babe Ruth was acquired from the Boston Red Sox in 1920, and transformed the Yankees overnight into a powerhouse

The Yankees purchased star pitcher-outfielder Babe Ruth from the Red Sox in January 1920, which made the Yankees a profitable franchise. The Yankees began to outdraw the Giants, with whom they shared the Polo Grounds. In 1921, the Yankees won the AL pennant for the first time but lost to the Giants in the World Series. As a result of the Yankees' increased popularity, Charles Stoneham, owner of the Giants and the Polo Grounds, raised the rent for the 1922 season. The Yankee owners responded by purchasing land in The Bronx, across the Harlem River from the Polo Grounds, from the estate of William Waldorf Astor for $675,000 ($12,983,350 in 2025), breaking ground on a new stadium in May 1922. That year, the Giants once again defeated the Yankees in the World Series. Yankee Stadium opened on April 18, 1923, the first ballpark with three tiers of seating for fans and the first referred to as a "stadium". Ruppert and Huston self-financed the project for $2.5 million ($48,086,481 in 2025).

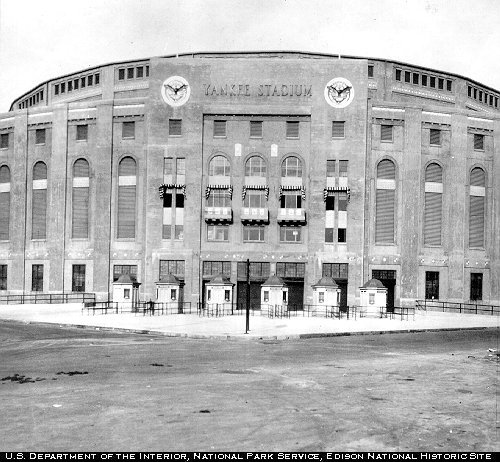
Ruth's popularity led to the 1923 construction of Yankee Stadium, a landmark in Major League Baseball

In May 1922, Ruppert bought out Huston for $1.5 million ($28,344,727 in 2025), and he became the sole owner. The following season, the Yankees finally beat the Giants to win their first World Series title. The Yankees went on to dominate baseball throughout most of the 1920s and 1930s, winning three more pennants from 1926 through 1928, including the Murderers' Row team that won the 1927 World Series and repeated as champions the following year. They returned to the top with the 1932 World Series title and then began their strongest period yet with the Bronx Bombers teams of the late 1930s, becoming the first team to win three consecutive World Series titles in 1936, 1937 and 1938. In 1937, the Yankees became the first team to win six World Series titles, and in 1938 they surpassed the Philadelphia Athletics to become the first team to win ten AL championships, with only the Giants winning more pennants in the 20th century.

In 1929, Ruppert added numbers to the Yankees' uniforms, which became a feature of every team. He said, "Many fans do not attend games on a regular basis and cannot easily pick out the players they have come to see."

In 1931, Commissioner Kenesaw Mountain Landis allowed for the creation of farm systems directly operated by major league teams. Ruppert bought the Newark Bears, who played at Ruppert Stadium in Newark, New Jersey, and begin building the Yankees' farm system.

Ruppert's 24 years as owner of the Yankees saw him build the team from an also-ran to a baseball powerhouse. His own strength as a baseball executive, including his willingness to wheel and deal, was aided by the business skills of general manager Ed Barrow and the forceful field managing of Miller Huggins, until his sudden death at age 50 late in the 1929 season, and Joe McCarthy, beginning in 1931. By the time of Ruppert's death, the team was well on its way to becoming the most successful in the history of Major League Baseball, and eventually in North American professional sports.

Ruppert and Ruth had public disagreements about Ruth's contracts. Nevertheless, they were personal friends; according to Ruth, Ruppert called him "Babe" only once, and that was the night before he died. Usually, Ruppert called him "Root" (as "Ruth" sounded in his German-accented diction); he always called everyone, even close friends, by their last name. Ruth was one of the last persons to see Ruppert alive.

== Personal life ==
In 1894, Ruppert purchased South Brother Island, located in the East River, and was the last person to live on the island, leaving in 1909 when his house burned down. He purchased Eagle's Rest, an estate in Garrison, New York, on January 30, 1919.

== Death and legacy ==
=== Death ===
Ruppert suffered from phlebitis in April 1938 and was confined to his Fifth Avenue apartment for most of the year. He was too sick to follow the Yankees to the 1938 World Series, what would be their seventh world title under his stewardship; he listened on the radio. In November 1938, he checked into Lenox Hill Hospital, where he died on January 13, 1939. He was survived by his brother George and his sister Amanda and was interred in the family mausoleum at Kensico Cemetery in Valhalla, New York.

=== Legacy ===
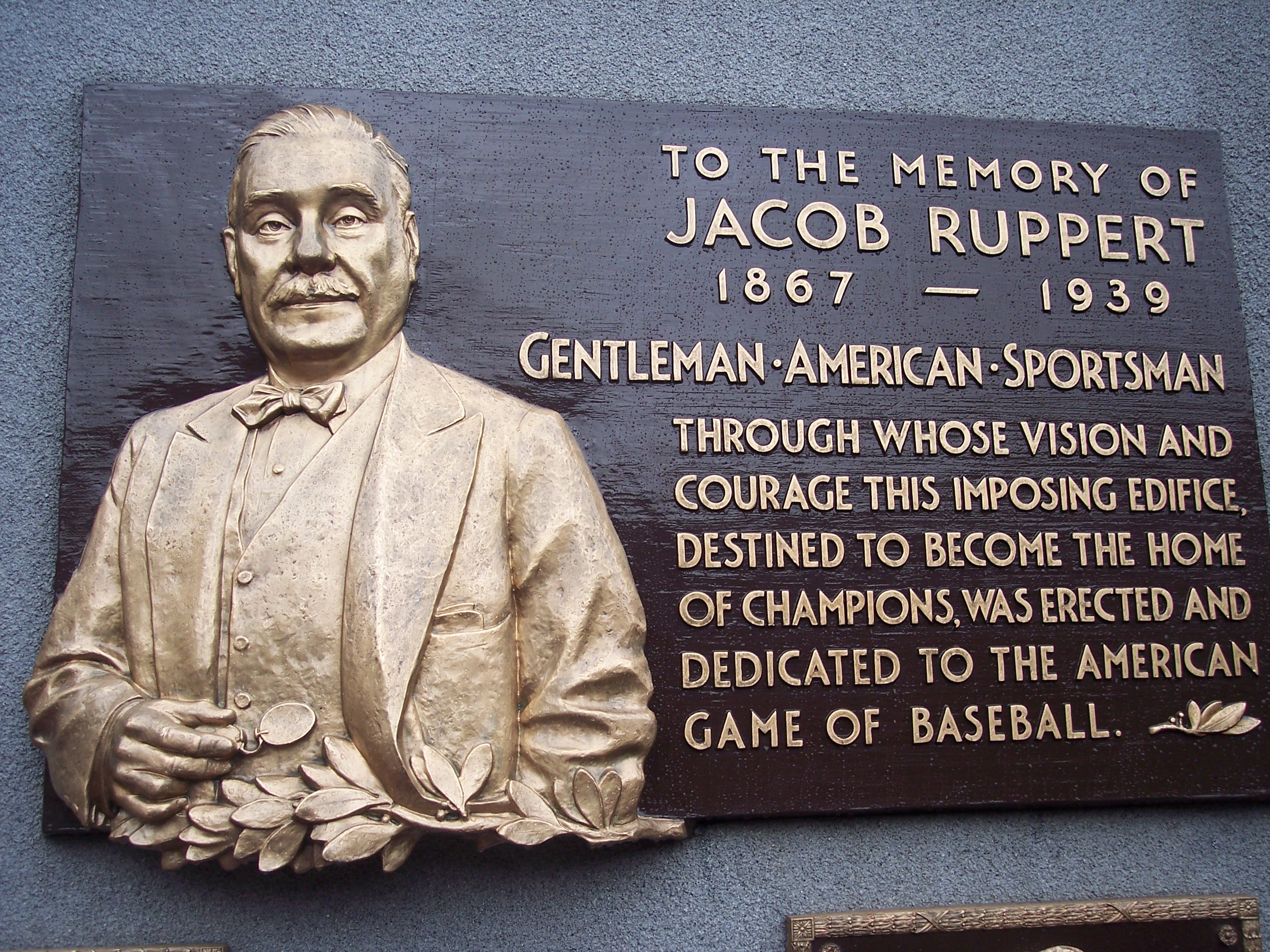
Ruppert's plaque in Monument Park

Ruppert's father, Jacob Sr., left behind an estate of $6,382,758 ($206,318,038 in 2025) when he died in 1915, which Ruppert increased to $120 million ($2,777,511,962) by the time of his death in 1939. This was managed by his heirs. His brother George, who served as the Yankees' vice president, declined to take over the team presidency, and instead recommended that general manager Ed Barrow be given control of the club. Under Barrow's leadership, the Yankees won a fourth consecutive World Series in 1939, and captured three more AL titles and two World Series from 1941 to 1943 as the nation entered World War II. After mismanaging Ruppert's brewery, the heirs sold the Yankees to Dan Topping, Del Webb and Larry MacPhail in 1945. The brewery sold its flagship beer, Knickerbocker beer, to Rheingold, and went out of business in 1965.

On April 16, 1940, the Yankees dedicated a plaque in Ruppert's memory, to hang on the center field wall of Yankee Stadium, near the flagpole and the monument that had been dedicated to former manager Miller Huggins. The plaque called Ruppert "Gentleman, American, sportsman, through whose vision and courage this imposing edifice, destined to become the home of champions, was erected and dedicated to the American game of baseball." The plaque now rests in Monument Park at New Yankee Stadium.

An apocryphal story says that Ruppert is responsible for the Yankees' famous pinstriped uniforms; according to this account, Ruppert chose pinstripes to make the often-portly Ruth appear less obese, but the uniform was, in fact, introduced in 1912.

A beer was named after Ruppert, as were Ruppert Stadium in Newark, New Jersey. Ruppert Park in Manhattan, is part of the Ruppert Yorkville Towers housing complex was built on the site the brewery in Yorkville, Manhattan.

== National Baseball Hall of Fame ==
On December 3, 2012, Ruppert was elected to the National Baseball Hall of Fame by the new Pre-Integration Era Committee, which considers candidates (managers, umpires, executives, and players) every three years that have been identified by the Baseball Writers' Association of America (BBWAA) appointed Historical Overview Committee from the era prior to 1947. He was inducted into the Hall on July 28, 2013. Anne Vernon, a fifth-generation descendant of Ruppert's brother George, gave his induction speech.

== See also ==
- New York Yankees managers and ownership

Business positions
Preceded by William S. Devery and Frank Farrell	Owner of the New York Yankees with Tillinghast L' Hommedieu Huston 1915–1922 sole proprietor 1922–1939	Succeeded by Jacob Ruppert Estate
U.S. House of Representatives
Preceded by Philip B. Low	Member of the U.S. House of Representatives from New York's 15th congressional district 1899–1903	Succeeded by William H. Douglas
Preceded by Cornelius Amory Pugsley	Member of the U.S. House of Representatives from New York's 16th congressional district 1903–1907	Succeeded by Francis Burton Harrison
