= Jacob Ruppert Sr. House =

Demolished mansion in Manhattan, New York

Coordinates: 40.786034°N 73.957051°W

The Jacob Ruppert Sr. House was a large mansion located on 1115 Fifth Avenue (now 1119 Fifth Avenue) on the southeast corner of East 93rd Street and Fifth Avenue, on the Upper East Side of Manhattan, New York City.

== History ==
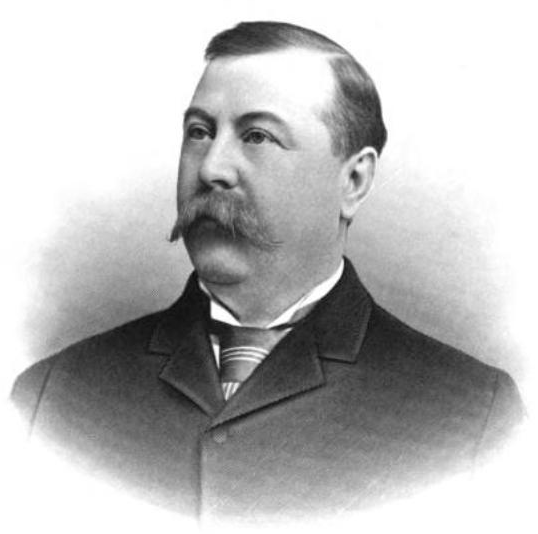
Jacob Ruppert Sr.

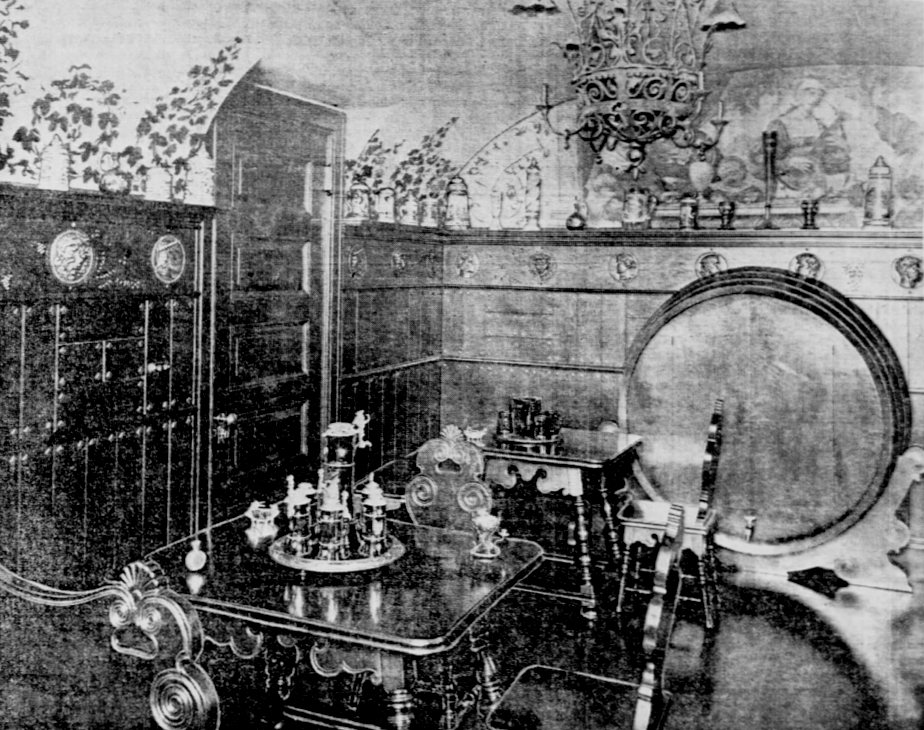
Kneipstube in 1903

It was originally constructed for the brewer Jacob Ruppert Sr. (1842–1915), the father of Jacob Ruppert, in 1883. His parents originally came from Bavaria. The building was designed by William Schickel.

The house featured a small German kneipstube, or taproom, which still exists. The structure itself was sold by the heirs and torn down in 1925.
