= Matthew D. Mann =

American gynecologist (1845–1921)

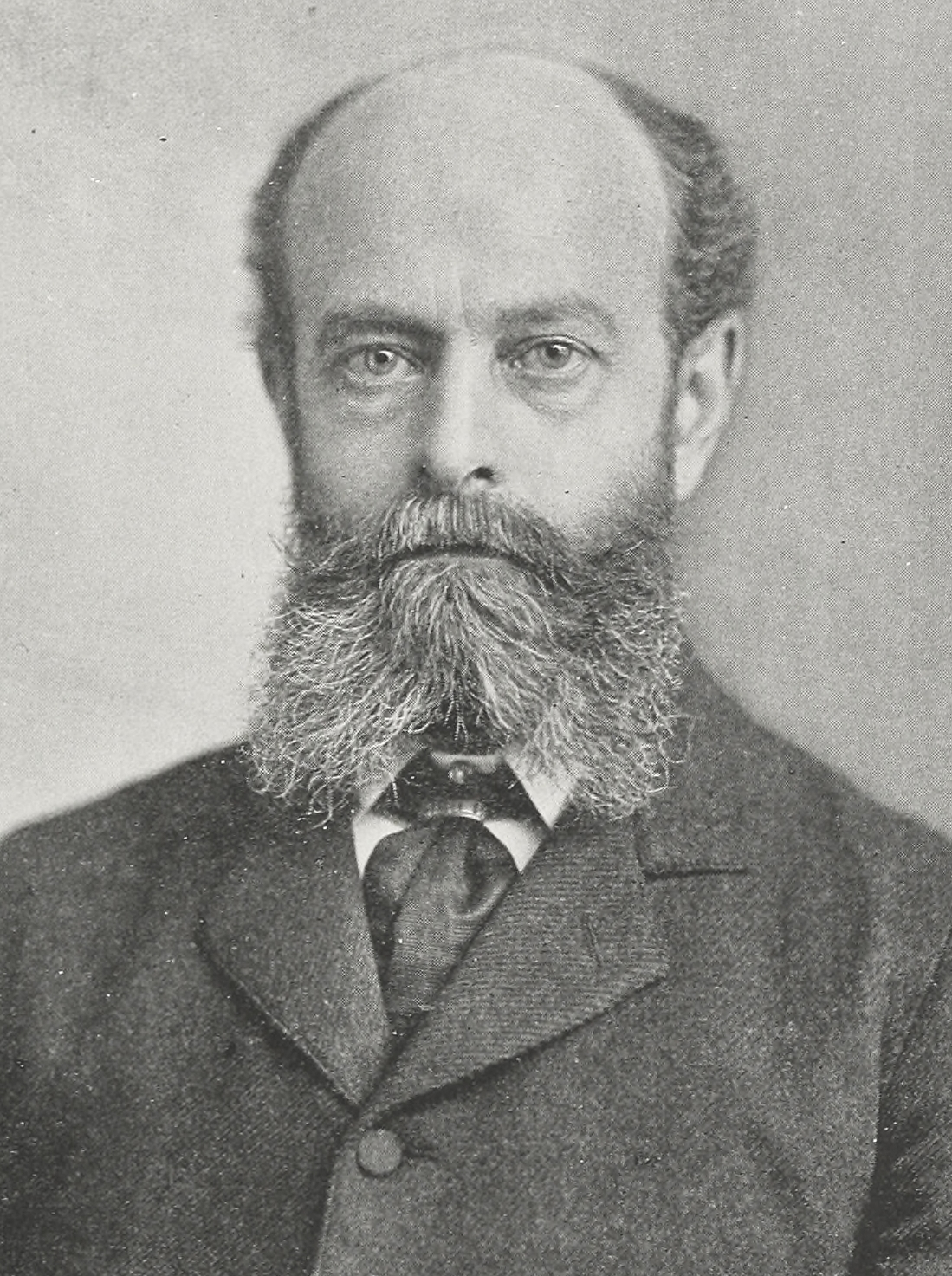
- Mann in 1897
- Born: Matthew Derbyshire Mann; July 12, 1845; Utica, New York, U.S.
- Died: March 2, 1921 (aged 75); Buffalo, New York, U.S.
- Resting place: Forest Lawn Cemetery
- Education: Yale University (AB, AM); Columbia University College of Physicians and Surgeons (MD)
- Occupations: Gynecologist, surgeon
- Known for: Operating on President McKinley after his attempted assassination
- Spouse: Elizabeth Pope (m. 1869)
- Children: 7
- Father: Charles Addison Mann
- Relatives: Abijah Mann Jr. (uncle); John Shelton Curtiss (grandson)

Matthew Derbyshire Mann (July 12, 1845 – March 2, 1921) was an American gynecologist and one of the surgeons who operated on President William McKinley after he was shot on the grounds of the Pan-American Exposition on September 6, 1901, in Buffalo, New York, by anarchist Leon Czolgosz.

== Early life ==
Matthew Derbyshire Mann was born on July 12, 1845, in Utica, New York, Emma (née Bagg) and New York State Senator Charles Addison Mann.

He graduated from Yale University with a Bachelor of Arts in 1867 and a Master of Arts in 1870. He graduated from the Columbia University College of Physicians and Surgeons in 1871 with a Doctor of Medicine. After two years of study in Europe, he practiced in New York until 1879, then in Hartford, Connecticut, until 1882. From 1880 to 1882, he was a clinical lecturer at Yale.

== Career ==
Mann moved to Buffalo and taught as a professor of obstetrics and gynecology at the University of Buffalo until he retired in 1910. He was affiliated with the Democratic Party. He was appointed by Buffalo mayor James N. Adam as a member of the commission to revise the charter of Buffalo. He also served as park commissioner of Buffalo.

In 1894, Mann began working as a consulting gynecologist and obstetrician at the Buffalo General Hospital. In 1894, he was president of the American Gynecological Society. He edited an American System of Gynecology (two volumes, 1887–1888), and wrote Immediate Treatment of Rupture of the Perineum (1874) and Manual of Prescription Writing (1878; sixth edition, revised, 1907).

Mann operated on President William McKinley after he was shot on the grounds of the Pan-American Exposition on September 6, 1901.

== Personal life ==
Mann married Elizabeth Pope on November 11, 1869, in St. Paul, Minnesota. They had seven children, Ethel, Edward Cox, Arthur S., Paul F., Matthew D. Jr., Alan N. and Richard They lived on Allen Street in Buffalo. He was senior warden of St. Paul's Episcopal Church.

Mann died in Buffalo on March 2, 1921. He was cremated and interred in Forest Lawn Cemetery.

== See also ==
- Assassination of William McKinley
