= Jesse C. Dayton =

American politician

Jesse C. Dayton (born 1825 in Westerlo, Albany County, New York; died May 26, 1903, in Colonie, New York) was an American merchant and politician from New York.

== Life ==
In 1844, he went to New York City, became first a clerk, and then a merchant. Later he bought a farm in Watervliet where he resided while still looking after his business interests in New York City. He was Supervisor of Watervliet in 1873.

He was a member of the New York State Senate (13th D.) in 1874 and 1875.

Dayton had a brother, George Dayton, who happened to serve in the New Jersey State Senate at the same time as his own service in the New York State Senate.

Dayton died in Colonie, New York "from the infirmities incident to old age", at the age of 77.

== Sources ==
- Life Sketches of Government Officers and Members of the Legislature of the State of New York in 1875 by W. H. McElroy and Alexander McBride (pg. 52ff) [e-book]

New York State Senate
Preceded by Charles H. Adams	New York State Senate; 13th District; 1874–1875	Succeeded by Hamilton Harris
