= Cornelius Amory Pugsley =

American politician

Cornelius A. Pugsley, Sr.
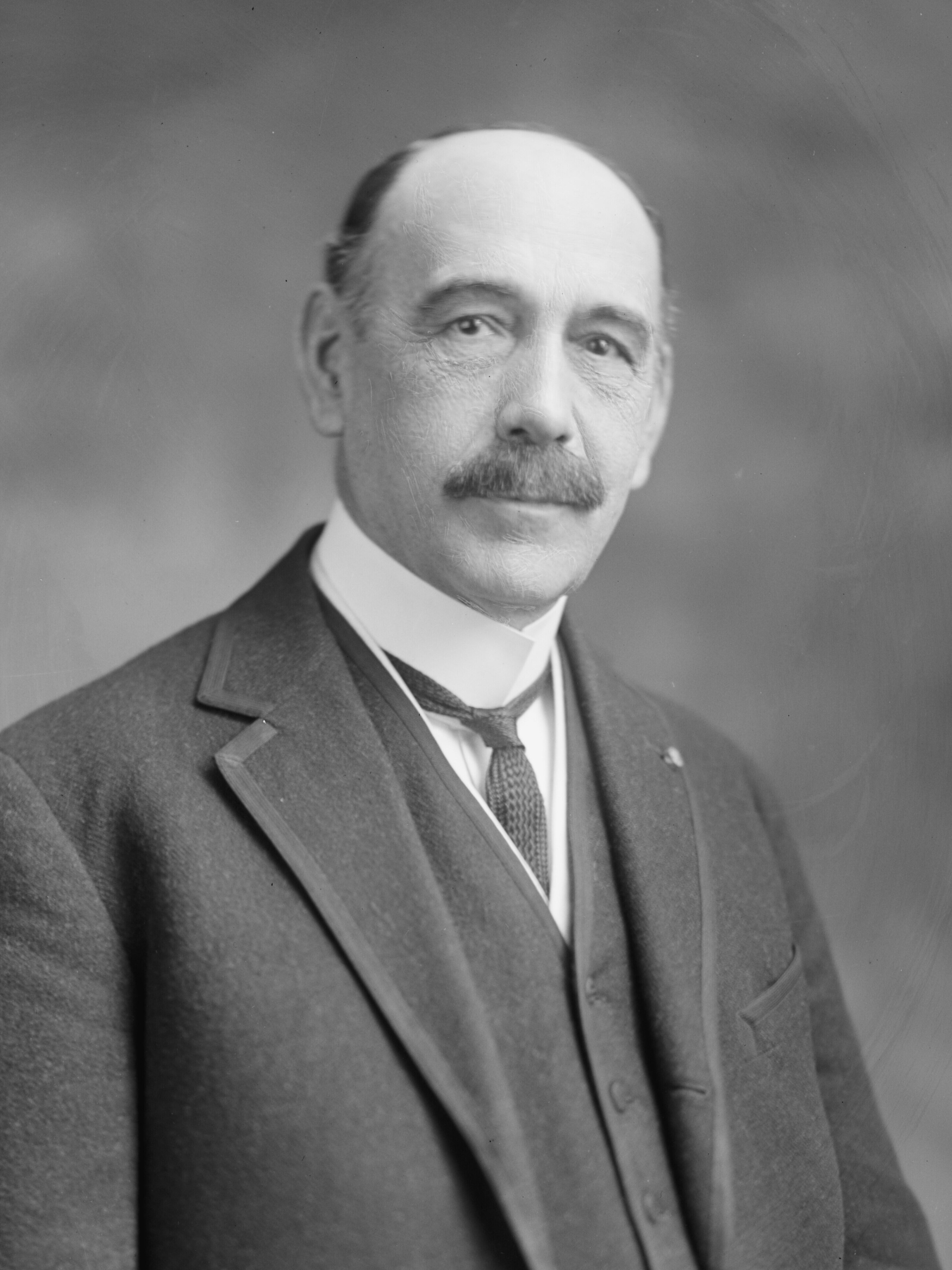

12th President General of the Sons of the American Revolution
- In office 1906–1907
- Preceded by: Francis Henry Appleton
- Succeeded by: Nelson Alvin McClary

Member of the U.S. House of Representatives from New York's 16th district
- In office March 4, 1901 – March 3, 1903
- Preceded by: John Q. Underhill
- Succeeded by: Jacob Ruppert

Personal details
- Born: Cornelius Amory Pugsley; July 17, 1850 Peekskill, New York, U.S.
- Died: September 10, 1936 (aged 86) Peekskill, New York, U.S.
- Resting place: Raymond Hill Cemetery, Carmel, New York
- Party: Democratic

Cornelius Amory Pugsley Sr. (July 17, 1850 – September 10, 1936) was the Democratic congressman from New York's 16th congressional district from 1901 to 1903. He was also president of the New York State Bankers Association in 1913. He created the Pugsley Medal in 1928 to honor champions of parks and conservation.

== Biography ==
He was born in Peekskill, New York on July 17, 1850 to Gilbert T. Pugsley and a Meeker. Cornelius was a direct descendant of James Pugsley, who emigrated from England in 1680. Pugsley attended public schools and was instructed in higher education by a private tutor.

=== Early career ===
His first job was as a clerk at the Peekskill, New York post office, he later served as the assistant postmaster from 1867 to 1870.

He engaged in the banking business in 1870. He served as president of the board of trustees of the Peekskill Military Academy.

=== Congress ===
Pugsley was elected as a Democrat to the Fifty-seventh Congress (March 4, 1901 – March 3, 1903). He was an unsuccessful candidate for reelection in 1902 to the Fifty-eighth Congress.

=== Later career ===
He resumed banking in Peekskill. He served as president general of the Sons of the American Revolution in 1906 and 1907. He served as delegate to the 1908 Democratic National Convention. He served as president of the New York State Bankers' Association in 1913. He served as president of the Westchester County National Bank, Peekskill, New York. He served as member of the Westchester County Park Commission.

Mr. Pugsley was President of The Field Library Board of Trustees from the date of its incorporation, April 7, 1887, until his demise September 10, 1936. In 1929, a Memorial in Books Fund was established in Pugsley's honor by his son, Chester DeWitt Pugsley, also a Field Library Trustee.

=== Family ===
He married Emma Catherine Gregory on April 7, 1886 and had a son, Chester DeWitt Pugsley who was an alternate delegate to Democratic National Convention from New York in 1916. Emma was the daughter of John H. Gregory.

=== Death ===
He died in Peekskill, New York, on September 10, 1936, and was interred in Raymond Hill Cemetery, Carmel, New York.

U.S. House of Representatives
Preceded by John Q. Underhill	Member of the U.S. House of Representatives from New York's 16th congressional district 1901–1903	Succeeded by Jacob Ruppert, Jr.
