= Arphaxed Loomis =

19th century American congressman

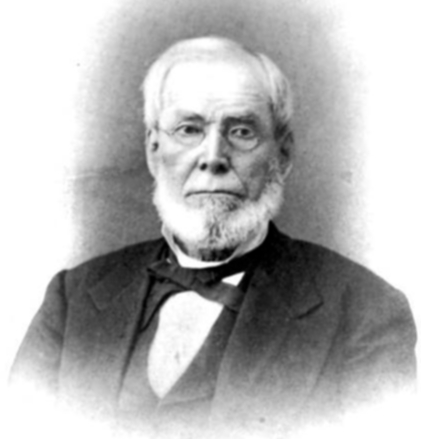

Member of the U.S. House of Representatives from New York's 16th district
- In office March 4, 1837 – March 3, 1839
- Preceded by: Abijah Mann Jr.
- Succeeded by: Andrew W. Doig

Member of the New York State Assembly from the Herkimer 1st district
- In office 1853–1854
- Preceded by: John Hoover
- Succeeded by: Gardner Hinkley

Personal details
- Born: April 9, 1798 Winsted, Connecticut, U.S.
- Died: September 15, 1885 (aged 87) Little Falls, New York, U.S.
- Resting place: Church Street Cemetery
- Party: Democratic

Arphaxed Loomis (April 9, 1798 – September 15, 1885) was an American lawyer and judge. He was a member of the U.S. House of Representatives, representing New York's 16th district during the 25th Congress (1837–1839). His unusual first name is from a character in the Bible, a grandson of Noah named Arphacshad.

== Early career ==
Born in Winsted, Connecticut, Loomis moved to New York in 1801 with his parents, who settled upon a farm in the town of Salisbury, Herkimer County.

He attended the common schools and Fairfield Academy, Fairfield, New York. He studied law, was admitted to the bar at Albany in 1822 and commenced practice at Sackets Harbor, New York, the same year.

== Career ==
He returned to Salisbury in 1825, but later in that year moved to Little Falls, New York, and continued the practice of his profession. He was surrogate of Herkimer County from 1828 to 1836, and as commissioner to investigate the State prisons in 1834. He was county judge of Herkimer County in 1835–1840.

=== Congress ===
Loomis was elected as a Democrat to the Twenty-fifth Congress (March 4, 1837 – March 3, 1839). He served as chairman of the Committee on Patents (Twenty-fifth Congress). He was not a candidate for renomination in 1838.

== Later career ==
He served as member of the New York State Assembly in 1841 and 1842. He served as a member of the State constitutional convention in 1846. He served as a member of the commission to revise, abridge, and simplify pleadings and proceedings in civil actions in 1847. He was again a member of the New York State Assembly in 1853 and 1854. He served as a delegate to the Democratic State conventions in 1861 and 1863.

== Death and burial ==
He died at Little Falls, New York, September 15, 1885. He was interred in the Church Street Cemetery.

== References and sources ==
- United States Congress. "Arphaxed Loomis (id: L000437)". Biographical Directory of the United States Congress.

New York State Assembly
Preceded by John Hoover	New York State Assembly; Herkimer County, 1st District; 1853–1854	Succeeded by Gardner Hinkley
U.S. House of Representatives
Preceded by Abijah Mann, Jr.	Member of the U.S. House of Representatives from New York's 16th congressional district 1837–1839	Succeeded by Andrew W. Doig
