= Nathan Soule =

American politician

Member of the New York State Assembly
- In office 1837

Member of the U.S. House of Representatives from New York's 16th district
- In office March 4, 1831 – March 3, 1833
- Preceded by: Benedict Arnold
- Succeeded by: Abijah Mann Jr.

Personal details
- Born: August 7, 1790 Dover Plains, New York, U.S.
- Died: January 9, 1860 (aged 69)
- Resting place: Pine Plains Cemetery, Clay, New York, U.S.
- Party: Jacksonian
- Profession: Politician

Nathan Soule (August 7, 1790 – January 9, 1860) was an American politician who served one term as a U.S. representative from New York from 1831 to 1833.

== Biography ==
Born in Dover Plains, New York, Soule resided at Fort Plain. He completed preparatory studies.

=== Congress ===
Soule was elected as a Jacksonian to the Twenty-second Congress (March 4, 1831 – March 3, 1833). He served as a member of the New York State Assembly in 1837.

== Death and burial ==
Soule died on January 9, 1860, and is buried in Pine Plains Cemetery in Clay, New York.

== Sources ==
- United States Congress. "Nathan Soule (id: S000681)". Biographical Directory of the United States Congress.

U.S. House of Representatives
Preceded by Benedict Arnold	Member of the U.S. House of Representatives from New York's 16th congressional district 1831–1833	Succeeded by Abijah Mann Jr.
