= List of people associated with Albany County, New York =

This is a list of notable people whose lives were significantly associated with Albany County, New York.

== Chronological list ==
=== 18th century ===
- Peter Van Brugh Livingston (1710–1792), born in Albany; politician who supported the American Revolution; presiding officer of the first New York provincial congress in 1775
- Philip Livingston (1716–1778), born in Albany; local merchant; delegate to the Continental Congress; signer of the Declaration of Independence
- William Livingston (1723–1790), born in Albany; newspaper publisher; member of the Continental Congress; first Governor of New Jersey
- Henry Bogart (1729–1821), signer of the Sons of Liberty Constitution in 1766; elected representative of the first ward on the Albany Committee of Correspondence
- Abraham Cuyler (1742–1810), born in Albany; former mayor of Albany, merchant, land owner and British loyalist
- John Tayler (1742–1829), businessman and politician; represented Albany County in the New York State Assembly (1777–1779, 1780–1781, and 1785–1787); appointed city recorder (deputy mayor) of Albany in 1793; justice of the Court of Common Pleas in 1797; represented Albany in the New York Senate 1802–1813; lieutenant governor (1811–1822); acting governor in 1817; died in Albany and is buried in Albany Rural Cemetery in Menands
- Peter W. Yates (1747–1826), lawyer and Continental Congressman; grew up in Albany and developed a prosperous legal practice there; served on the Albany City Council and in the county militia at the start of the American Revolution; represented Albany in the New York State Assembly and the Continental Congress
- Peter Gansevoort (1749–1812), colonel in the Continental Army during the American Revolutionary War; born and died in Albany
- Isaac Mitchell (1759–1812), born in Albany; journalist, author, and editor of the Poughkeepsie Guardian, Albany Republican Crisis, and Poughkeepsie Republican Herald
- Alexander Boyd (1764–1857), U.S. congressman; born in Albany
- James Cochran (1769–1848), U.S. congressman from New York; journalist; born in Albany
- Jacob Cuyler (1773–1854), born in Albany; British officer involved in the settlement of the 1820 Settlers to the Eastern Cape, South Africa
- Harmanus Bleecker (1779–1849), U.S. congressman; born in Albany
- Herman Knickerbocker (1779–1855), U.S. congressman; born in Albany
- John Duer (1782–1858), born in Albany; jurist; author; chief judge of New York Superior Court
- Harmanus Peek (1782–1838), born in Albany; U.S. congressman from New York
- Gerrit Y. Lansing (1783–1862), born in Albany; U.S. congressman; bank and insurance company president
- John K. Kane (1795–1858), born in Albany; politician, attorney, and jurist
- Joseph Henry (1797–1878), born in Albany; inventor of low- and high-resistance galvanometers; first secretary of the Smithsonian Institution
- Robert Sanders (1705–1765), mayor of Albany from 1750 to 1754

=== 19th century ===
- James Montgomery Bailey (1841–1894), journalist and author; founder of newspapers Danbury News and Danbury Evening News; native of Albany
- William Bliss Baker (1856–1886), landscape artist in the Realism movement
- William Barnes Sr., attorney and Republican Party organizer
- Nicholas F. Beck (1796–1830), Adjutant General of New York
- Herman Bendell (1843–1932), physician; Civil War surgeon; superintendent of Indian Affairs Arizona Territory; American Consul Elsinore, Denmark; native of Albany
- James H. Blessing (1837–1910), mayor of Albany from 1900 to 1901
- William Henry Bogart (1810–1888), member of the New York Legislature; author
- Francis Putnam Burns (1811–?), piano maker in Albany
- Joseph Bradford Carr (1828–1895), born in Albany; Union Army general; Secretary of State of New York
- Robert Carter (1819–1879), born in Albany; author and editor; involved in the foundation of the Republican Party
- Nanette Comstock (1866–1942), born in Albany, stage actress
- Roscoe Conkling (1829–1888), United States congressman and United States senator from New York; born in Albany
- John G. Farnsworth (1832–1895), Adjutant General of New York
- William Jermyn Florence (1831–1891), born in Albany; actor; comedian; improvisationalist
- Eugenia Gibson (1856/57 - 1945), missionary and educator
- Joseph R. Grismer (1849–1922), actor, playwright and theatrical producer; born in Albany
- Abraham Oakey Hall (1826–1898), born in Albany; mayor of New York City; author
- Thomas W. Harman (1807–1848), born in Albany, Adjutant General of New York
- Learned Hand (1872–1961), United States judge and judicial philosopher
- Henry James Sr. (1811–1882), born in Albany; Swedenborgian theologian; father of William James, Henry James, and Alice James
- Lucy Stedman Lamson (1857–1926), businesswoman, educator
- Daniel Manning (1831–1887), born in Albany; journalist and later United States Secretary of the Treasury
- Homer Dodge Martin (1836–1897), born in Albany; painter whose talent was not recognized until his death
- Selden E. Marvin (1835–1899), Adjutant General of New York
- James Campbell Matthews (1844–1930), New York's first African-American law school graduate and judge of Albany's Recorder's Court
- Henry Strong McCall (1819–1893), moved to Albany; educator, lawyer, and writer
- John McKeon (1808–1883), born in Albany; district attorney for New York County and Southern New York; US congressman from New York
- Henry B. Metcalfe (1805–1881), born in Albany; prosecuting attorney, judge, and US congressman from New York
- John Pitkin Norton (1822–1852), born in Albany; chemist and educator; helped found the Sheffield Scientific School
- Emily Sullivan Oakey (1829–1883), born in Albany; educator, author, poet, hymnist
- John Rathbone Oliver (1872–1943), born in Albany; psychiatrist, medical historian, author, and priest
- Annie L. Y. Orff (1861–1914), journalist; magazine editor and publisher
- William Page (1811–1885), born in Albany; considered the leading American painter of his time
- Rufus Wheeler Peckham (1809–1873), lawyer, judge, and U.S. congressman; born in Rensselaerville; the county's district attorney, 1838–1841; served on the New York Supreme Court, Third Judicial District (1861–1869) seated in Albany, then on the New York Court of Appeals (1870–1873); was lost at sea; his cenotaph is in Albany Rural Cemetery in Menands
- Rufus Wheeler Peckham (1838–1909), New York state court judge and U.S. Supreme Court justice; son of Rufus Wheeler Peckham (1809–1873)
- Wheeler Hazard Peckham (1833–1905), lawyer and defeated nominee to the U.S. Supreme Court; son of Rufus Wheeler Peckham (1809-1873)
- John F. Rathbone (1819–1901), industrialist and Adjutant General of New York
- Cy Seymour (1872–1919), native of Albany, major league baseball player
- Theobald Smith (1859–1934), born in Albany; epidemiologist, bacteriologist, pathologist and professor
- Gilbert R. Spalding (1812–1880), showman and circus owner
- Samuel Stevens (1794–1854), Adjutant General of New York
- Frances E. Townsley (1850–1909), Baptist minister
- Luther Tucker (1802–1873), publisher of The Cultivator and Country Gentleman
- Oren Elbridge Wilson (1844–1917), mayor of Albany from 1894 to 1895
- Alice Ames Winter (1865–1944), litterateur, author and clubwoman

=== 20th century ===
- Adam Aleksic, linguist and content creator on YouTube and TikTok
- Philip Amelio (1977–2005), actor and teacher; graduated from the University at Albany and received a master's degree in education from the College of Saint Rose in Albany
- Norman C. Armitage (1907, as Norman Cudworth Cohn–1972), Olympic medalist saber fencer
- Robert Alan Beuth (b. 1957); actor, playwright and sculptor
- Rita Chatterton (b. 1957), professional wrestling referee
- William Barnes Jr. (1866–1930), newspaper publisher and Republican Party leader
- Talor Battle (b. 1988), basketball player who is currently an assistant coach for Northwestern Wildcats
- Greg Chevalier (b. 1985), soccer player and coach
- Ann Curless (b. 1963), Exposé singer
- Edmund L. Daley (1883–1968), U.S. Army major general
- Kirsten Gillibrand (b. 1966), U.S. senator for New York
- Kevin Graber (b. 1969), pro baseball coach
- Kevin Huerter (b.1998), NBA player for the Sacramento Kings and the Chicago Bulls
- William Kennedy (b. 1928), writer and journalist; wrote several books based in Albany, including Pulitzer Prize-winning Ironweed
- Thomas D. Kinley (b. 1945), US Army major general
- Mary Mellish (1890–1955), soprano at the Metropolitan Opera; born and died in Albany
- Howard C. Nolan Jr. (1932–2023), former member of the New York State Senate
- Martha Quinn (b. 1959), an original video jockey on MTV
- Emanuel Rackman (1910–2008), born in Albany, Modern Orthodox rabbi; President of Bar-Ilan University
- Walter G. Robinson (1879–1940), Adjutant General of New York
- Andy Rooney (1919–2011), radio and television writer; 60 Minutes
- Shoenice, (b. 1969 as Christopher Schewe), YouTuber and competitive eater
- Elise Stefanik (b. 1984), U.S. representative for New York
- Israel Tsvaygenbaum (b. 1961), Russian-American artist
- Beth Van Duyne (b. 1970), U.S. representative for Texas and mayor of Irving, Texas
- Anthony Vinciquerra (b.1954), former CEO of Fox Networks and current CEO of Sony Pictures Entertainment, born in Albany
- Franklin W. Ward (1870–1938), adjutant general of New York
- Edward J. Westcott (1873–1926), adjutant general of New York

== Alphabetical index ==
- Adam Aleksic, linguist and content creator on YouTube and TikTok
- Philip Amelio (1977–2005)
- James Montgomery Bailey (1841–1894)
- William Bliss Baker (1856–1886)
- William Barnes Jr. (1866–1930)
- William Barnes Sr. (1824–1913)
- Talor Battle, basketball player who last played for Hapoel Tel Aviv of the Israeli League
- Nicholas F. Beck (1796–1830)
- Herman Bendell (1843–1932)
- Harmanus Bleecker (1779–1849)
- William Henry Bogart (1810–1888)
- Alexander Boyd (1764–1857)
- Joseph Bradford Carr (1828–1895)
- Robert Carter (1819–1879)
- Greg Chevalier (b. 1985), soccer player and coach
- James Cochran (1769–1848)
- Roscoe Conkling (1829–1888)
- Edmund L. Daley (1883–1968)
- John Duer (1782–1858)
- John G. Farnsworth (1832–1895)
- William Jermyn Florence (1831–1891)
- Peter Gansevoort (1749–1812)
- Abraham Oakey Hall (1826–1898)
- Learned Hand (1872–1961)
- Thomas W. Harman (1807–1848)
- Joseph Henry (1797–1878)
- Henry James Sr. (1811–1882)
- John K. Kane (1795–1858)
- William Kennedy (born 1928)
- Thomas D. Kinley (born 1945)
- Herman Knickerbocker (1779–1855)
- Gerrit Y. Lansing (1783–1862)
- Peter Van Brugh Livingston (1710–1792)
- Philip Livingston (1716–1778)
- William Livingston (1723–1790)
- Daniel Manning (1831–1887)
- Selden E. Marvin (1835–1899)
- Homer Dodge Martin (1836–1897)
- John McKeon (1808–1883)
- Henry B. Metcalfe (1805–1881)
- Isaac Mitchell (1759–1812)
- Howard C. Nolan Jr. (1932–2023)
- John Pitkin Norton (1822–1852)
- William Page (1811–1885)
- Rufus Wheeler Peckham (1809–1873)
- Rufus Wheeler Peckham (1838–1909)
- Wheeler Hazard Peckham (1833–1905)
- Harmanus Peek (1782–1838)
- John F. Rathbone (1819–1901)
- Walter G. Robinson (1879–1940)
- Cy Seymour (1872–1919)
- Samuel
- John Tayler (1742–1829)
- Franklin W. Ward (1870–1938)
- Edward J. Westcott (1873–1926)
- Beth Van Duyne (b. 1970), U.S. representative for Texas and mayor of Irving, Texas
- Peter W. Yates (1747–1826)
