= Abraham J. Multer =

American politician

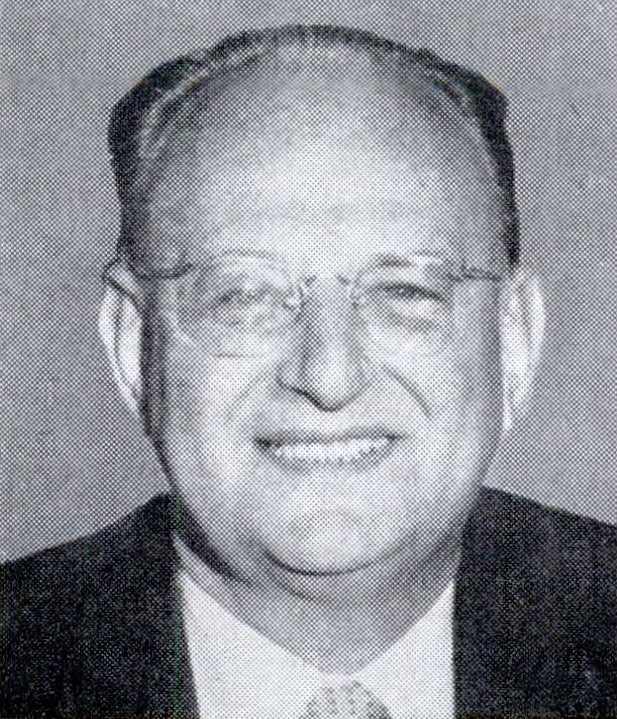
- Multer, c. 1961

Member of the U.S. House of Representatives from New York
- In office November 4, 1947 – December 31, 1967
- Preceded by: Leo F. Rayfiel
- Succeeded by: Bertram L. Podell
- Constituency: 14th district (1947–1953); 13th district (1953–1967)

Judge of the New York Supreme Court for the Second District
- In office January 1, 1968 – January 1, 1977

Personal details
- Born: December 24, 1900 New York City, U.S.
- Died: November 4, 1986 (aged 85) West Hartford, Connecticut, U.S.
- Party: Democratic
- Spouse: Bertha Leff (m. 1925)
- Children: 2
- Education: City College of New York; Brooklyn Law School
- Occupation: Lawyer; politician

Military service
- Allegiance: United States
- Branch/service: United States Coast Guard
- Years of service: 1943-1945
- Battles/wars: World War II

Abraham Jacob Multer (December 24, 1900 – November 4, 1986) was an American lawyer, jurist, and politician who served ten terms as a Democratic member of the United States House of Representatives from New York from 1947 to 1967.

== Biography ==
Born in New York City, the son of Max and Emma (née Rock) Multer, he graduated from City College of New York in 1921 and Brooklyn Law School in 1922. He served in the United States Coast Guard Reserve from 1943 until 1945 and the United States Coast Guard Auxiliary.

=== Congress ===
He was elected to Congress in 1947 to fill the vacancy caused by the resignation of his law partner Leo F. Rayfiel to take a federal district court seat. Multer served from November 4, 1947, until his resignation on December 31, 1967, after election to the New York Supreme Court on November 7, 1967, where he served from January 1, 1968, until January 1, 1977. Multer was a highly active member of the House. He spoke on the floor 1441 times and moved 45 floor amendments. Twenty-three were accepted, covering the District of Columbia, the Defense Production Act, Demonstration Cities, area redevelopment, the involvement of banks with lotteries, sales of government surplus, export controls, B’nai B’rith, veterans housing, credit unions, boycotts of Israel, and insured savings. He introduced 1529 public bills; nine were enacted, six addressing the governance of the District of Columbia, which was a committee membership of his. His major committee, however, was Banking and Currency, and his expertise got him in trouble. He was accused of aiding a bank and lottery in the Bahamas and making questionable investments in Florida, Milwaukee, and the District. The accusations caused the Liberal Party to withhold their endorsement from 1964 on, though he never lost the Democratic nomination.

He then served as special referee in the Brooklyn Appellate Division, from 1979 to 1984.

=== Family ===
He married Bertha Leff in 1925, and they had two sons, Robert and Howard.

=== Death ===
He died in West Hartford, Connecticut.

== See also ==
- List of Jewish members of the United States Congress

U.S. House of Representatives
Preceded by Leo F. Rayfiel	Member of the U.S. House of Representatives from New York's 14th congressional district 1947–1953	Succeeded by John J. Rooney
Preceded by Donald L. O'Toole	Member of the U.S. House of Representatives from New York's 13th congressional district 1953–1967	Succeeded by Bertram L. Podell
