= The Iron Mine, Port Henry, New York =

Painting by Homer Dodge Martin

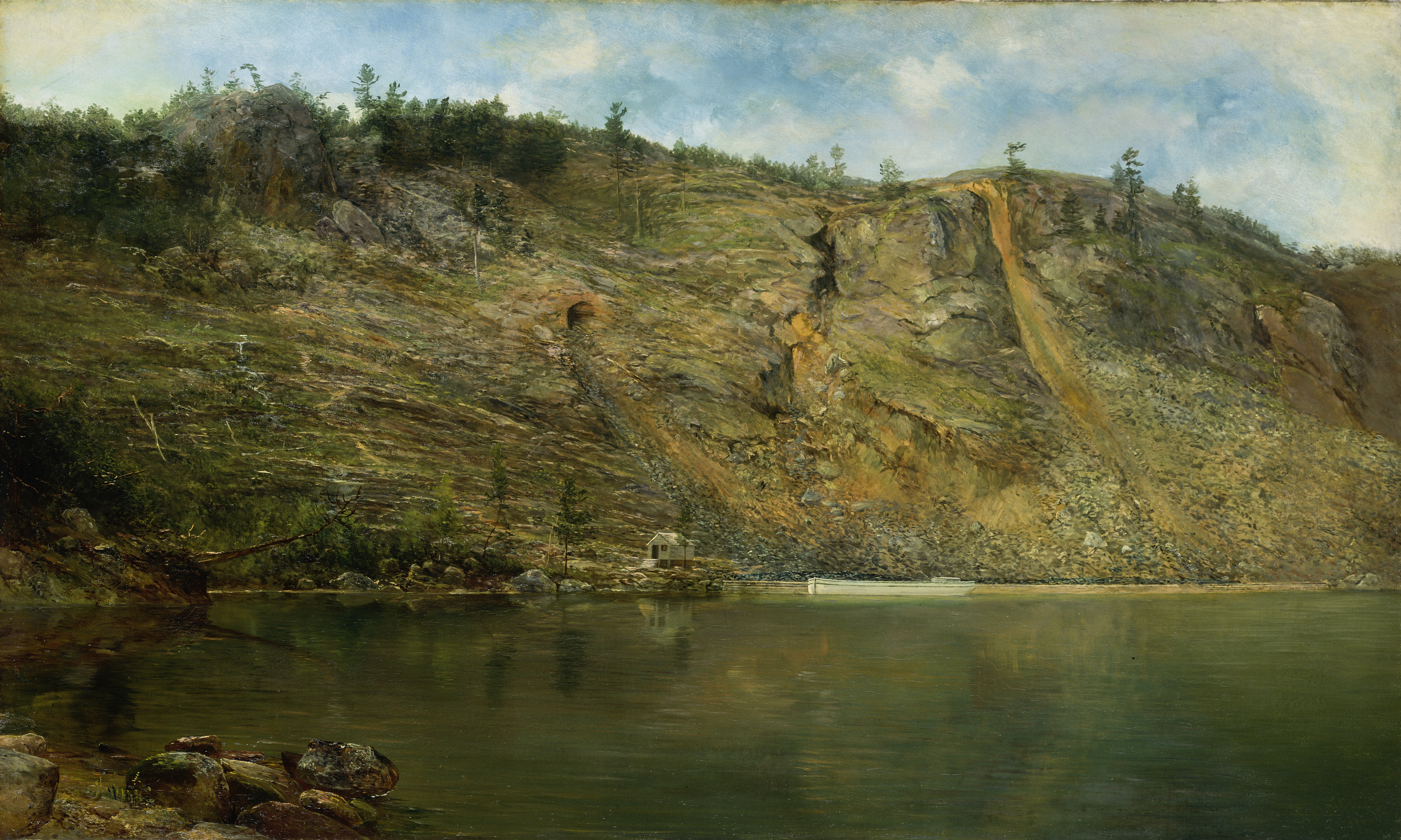
- Artist: Homer Dodge Martin
- Year: c. 1862
- Medium: Oil on canvas; fiberboard
- Dimensions: 76.5175 cm (30.1250 in) × 127 cm (50 in)
- Location: Smithsonian American Art Museum, United States
- Coordinates: 44°03′31″N 73°27′00″W
- Accession no.: 1910.9.11

The Iron Mine, Port Henry, New York (c. 1862) is a painting by Homer Dodge Martin in the collection of the Smithsonian American Art Museum and measures 30 1/8 x 50 in. (76.5 x 127.0 cm.).

The mine was in Craig Harbor near Port Henry, New York. After being loaded into barges the ore was taken to the nearby blast furnaces of the Bay State Iron Mine Company, and made into rails for railroads. "Painted during the Civil War, Martin's canvas quietly asserted the primacy of the North, whose strength lay in its natural resources and manufacturing."

The nearby hills were "one of the largest iron deposits in the country and the home of dozens of the 19th century's most important iron-producing communities in America." The Iron Center Museum in Port Henry specializes in this history. Craig Harbor's iron ore contained "65.23 percent metallic iron and was "extremely tough, and difficult to reduce to a state of sufficient fineness for the forge." North of this location, at Ore Bed Harbor near Essex, New York, is Split Rock Mountain, described in 1868 as containing "the largest deposit of Magnetic Ore in the State of New York.

After being lost for a number of years, The Iron Mine, Port Henry was rediscovered in an unused room at the Knoedler Galleries in New York City by then-manager Roland Knoedler. Unsure of the painting's attribution, he enlisted the advice of artist Edward Gay who recognized it as the work of Martin. Collector William T. Evans purchased the painting for $5,000 to give to the Smithsonian American Art Museum in 1910 (then called the National Gallery) and Knoedler shared some of the profits with Homer Martin's widow.
