= Peter Swart =

American politician

Member of the U.S. House of Representatives from New York's 13th district
- In office March 4, 1807 – March 3, 1809
- Preceded by: Thomas Sammons
- Succeeded by: Uri Tracy

Personal details
- Born: July 5, 1752 Schoharie, New York
- Died: November 3, 1829 (aged 77) Schoharie, New York
- Party: Democratic-Republican Party
- Occupation: Lawyer, judge, politician

Peter Swart (July 5, 1752 – November 3, 1829) was a United States representative from New York. Born in Schoharie, he attended the common schools, studied law, was admitted to the bar in New York and commenced the practice of law in Schoharie. He was judge of the Court of Common Pleas of Schoharie County in 1795, and was a member of the New York State Assembly in 1798 and 1799.

Swart was elected as a Democratic-Republican to the 10th United States Congress, holding office from March 4, 1807, to March 3, 1809. He was sheriff of Schoharie County in 1810 and 1813, and served in the New York State Senate from 1817 to 1820. He resumed the practice of his profession in Schoharie and died there in 1829; interment was in the Old Stone Fort Cemetery.

U.S. House of Representatives
Preceded by Thomas Sammons	Member of the U.S. House of Representatives from New York's 13th congressional district 1807–1809	Succeeded by Uri Tracy
