= Bertram L. Podell =

American politician

Bert Podell
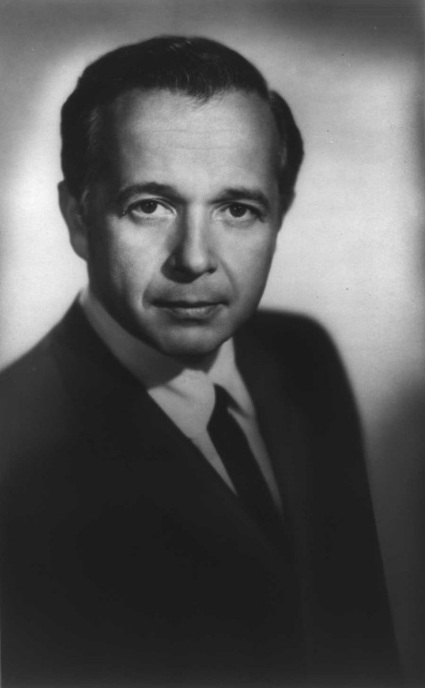

Member of the U.S. House of Representatives from New York's 13th district
- In office February 20, 1968 – January 3, 1975
- Preceded by: Abraham J. Multer
- Succeeded by: Stephen J. Solarz
- Constituency: Kings County's 21st district (1955-1965); 53rd district (1966); 44th district (1967-1968)

Member of the New York State Assembly
- In office January 1, 1955 – February 20, 1968
- Preceded by: Thomas Dwyer
- Succeeded by: Sidney Lichtman

Personal details
- Born: Bertram Lawrence Podell; December 27, 1925 New York City, U.S.
- Died: August 17, 2005 (aged 79) New York City, U.S.
- Party: Democratic
- Spouse: Bunny Posen
- Children: 3
- Education: St. John's University (BA); Brooklyn Law School (LLB)

Bertram Lawrence "Bert" Podell (December 27, 1925 – August 17, 2005) was an American politician who served in the New York State Assembly for six terms and part of a seventh, and was a member of the United States House of Representatives from New York for part of one term and three full terms. He was a Democrat.

In 1973, Podell was charged with bribery. He pled guilty to reduced charges of conspiracy and conflict of interest.

== Personal life ==
Podell was born on December 27, 1925, in Brooklyn, New York, the oldest of three children born to Hyman Podell and Henriette Menaker Podell. The family name was originally Podolsky. He attended Abraham Lincoln High School, joined the United States Navy for World War II, and served from 1944 until 1946. Podell graduated from St. John's University in 1947 and Brooklyn Law School in 1950.

== Professional and political career ==
Podell practiced in New York City, and specialized in real estate law.

=== State assembly ===
In 1954, he ran for the New York State Assembly; he defeated incumbent Thomas A. Dwyer in the Democratic primary, and went on to defeat Republican Irving Kornblum and two other candidates to win the general election. He served from 1955 to 1968, sitting in the 170th, 171st, 172nd, 173rd, 174th, 175th, 176th and 177th New York State Legislatures.

=== Congress ===
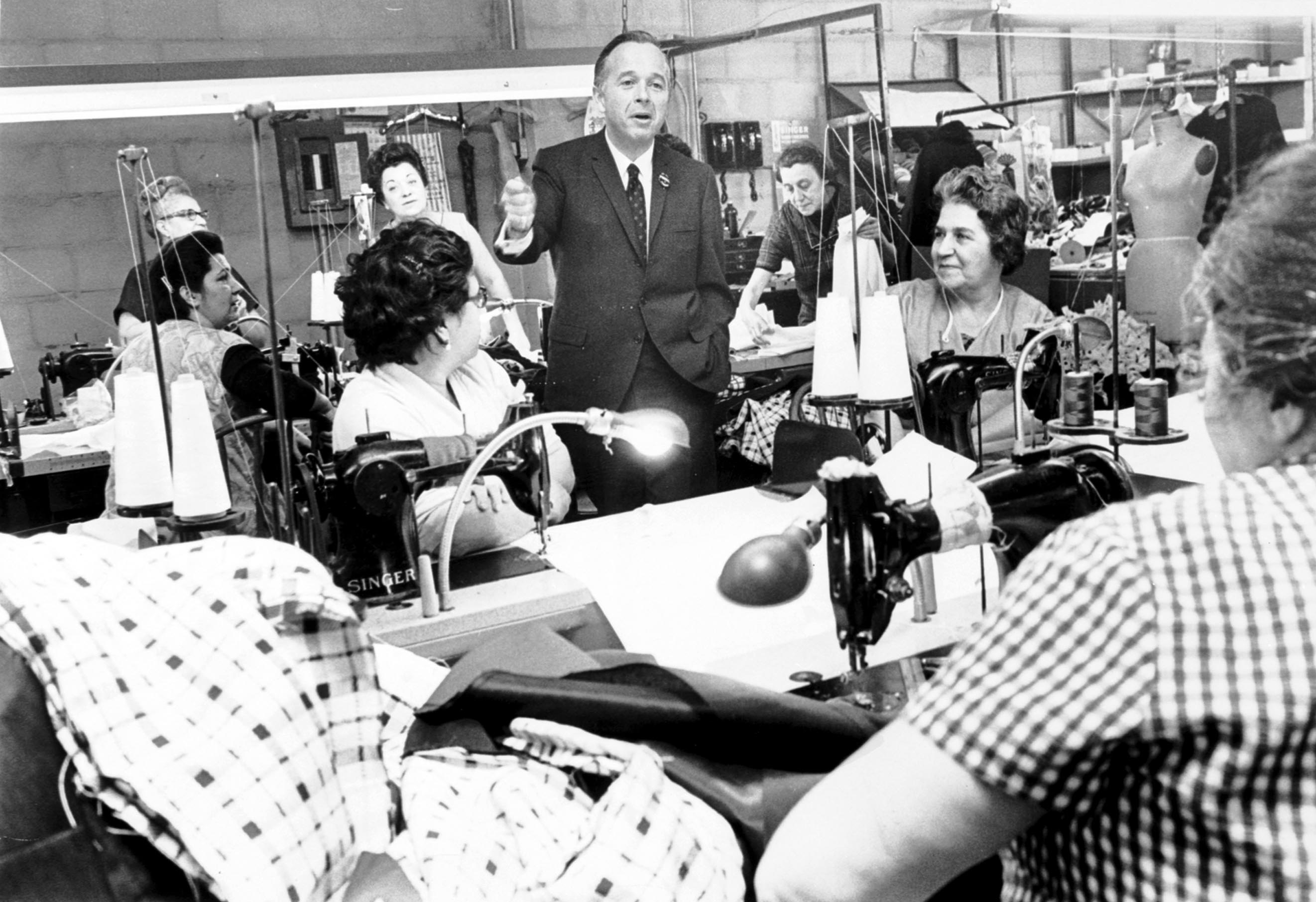
Podell speaking with garment workers in Brooklyn, March 1968.

Podell was elected as a Democrat to the 90th United States Congress to fill the vacancy caused by the resignation of Abraham J. Multer. He was re-elected to the 91st, 92nd and 93rd United States Congresses, holding office from February 20, 1968, to January 3, 1975.

== Criminal charges and election loss ==
In 1973, Podell was charged with bribery for allegedly accepting money to arrange approval of a route to The Bahamas for a small Florida-based airline. While under indictment, he was defeated in the 1974 Democratic primary by Stephen J. Solarz, who went on to win the general election.

Podell's case was one of the first that brought public attention to Rudolph Giuliani, then a prosecutor in the office of the United States Attorney for the Southern District of New York. Podell's trial took a dramatic turn when Giuliani aggressively cross-examined him, causing him to lose his composure and ask for a recess, after which he agreed to plead guilty to reduced charges of conspiracy and conflict of interest. Podell and co-defendant Martin Miller later attempted to withdraw their guilty pleas, but their motion was denied; Podell was sentenced to a $5,000 fine and 24 weeks in prison, of which he served 18. Podell and Miller unsuccessfully appealed their convictions.

Podell was disbarred by the New York Supreme Court Appellate Division because of his conviction, but then re-instated in 1980 after a New York State law was passed in 1979 made it possible for lawyers to retain their licenses if they were convicted under federal law for crimes which were not considered felonies under state law. Afterwards, Podell continued to practice law until shortly before his death.

== Death ==
Podell died in New York City on August 17, 2005. He was survived by his wife Bunny; two sons, a daughter, two brothers and five grandchildren.

== See also ==
- List of American federal politicians convicted of crimes
- List of federal political scandals in the United States
- List of Jewish members of the United States Congress

== Sources ==
- United States Congress. "Bertram L. Podell (id: P000399)". Biographical Directory of the United States Congress.

New York State Assembly
Preceded by Thomas Dwyer	Member of the New York Assembly from Kings County's 21st district 1955–1965	Constituency abolished
New constituency	Member of the New York Assembly from the 53rd district 1966	Succeeded by William J. Giordano
Preceded by Stanley Steingut	Member of the New York Assembly from the 44th district 1967–1968	Succeeded by Sidney Lichtman
U.S. House of Representatives
Preceded by Abraham J. Multer	Member of the U.S. House of Representatives from New York's 13th congressional district 1968–1975	Succeeded by Stephen J. Solarz
