= New York's 13th congressional district =

U.S. House district for New York

Coordinates: 40°50′20″N 73°55′59″W

- Interactive map of district boundaries since January 3, 2023
- Representative: Adriano Espaillat; D–Manhattan
- Area: 10.25 mi^{2} (26.5 km^{2})
- Distribution: 100.00% urban; 0.00% rural
- Population (2025): 748,592
- Median household income: $54,434
- Ethnicity: 52.3% Hispanic; 23.4% Black; 15.4% White; 5.1% Asian; 2.8% Two or more races; 1.1% other
- Cook PVI: D+32

New York's 13th congressional district is a congressional district for the United States House of Representatives in New York City, represented by Adriano Espaillat. It is the second poorest congressional district in New York state, with a median income of $50,491, per a 2024 study. The district also ranks second in the state, with the poverty rate at 25.7 percent, per a 2026 congressional study.

The 13th district comprises Upper Manhattan and parts of the West Bronx. It includes The Bronx neighborhoods of Bedford Park, Jerome Park, Kingsbridge Heights, parts of Norwood, and parts of Fordham, Kingsbridge, Morris Heights, and University Heights, and the Manhattan neighborhoods of Harlem, Inwood, Marble Hill, Spanish Harlem, Washington Heights, Hamilton Heights, and parts of Morningside Heights and the Upper West Side. The Apollo Theater and Grant's Tomb are within the district. In 2010 it was the smallest congressional district in the United States House of Representatives by Area, replaced by New York's 12th congressional district in 2020.

== Recent election results from statewide races ==
Year	Office	Results
2008	President	Obama 93% – 6%
2012	President	Obama 95% – 5%
2016	President	Clinton 92% – 5%
2016	Senate	Schumer 92% – 5%
2018	Senate	Gillibrand 95% – 5%
2018	Governor	Cuomo 92% – 5%
2018	Attorney General	James 94% – 5%
2020	President	Biden 88% – 11%
2022	Senate	Schumer 89% – 11%
2022	Governor	Hochul 86% – 14%
2022	Attorney General	James 88% – 12%
2022	Comptroller	DiNapoli 86% – 14%
2024	President	Harris 79% – 20%
2024	Senate	Gillibrand 83% – 16%

== History ==
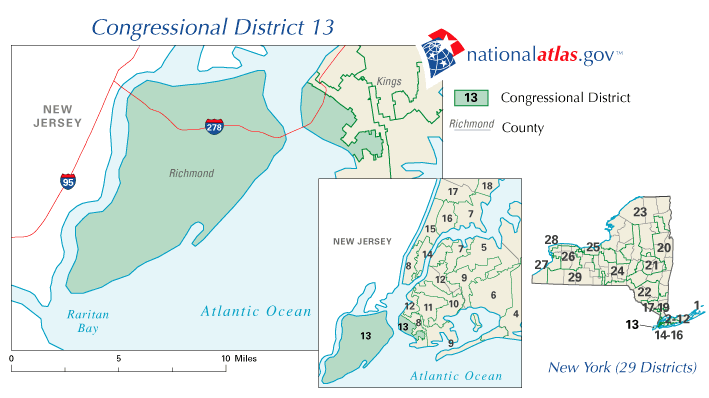
The district from 2003 to 2013

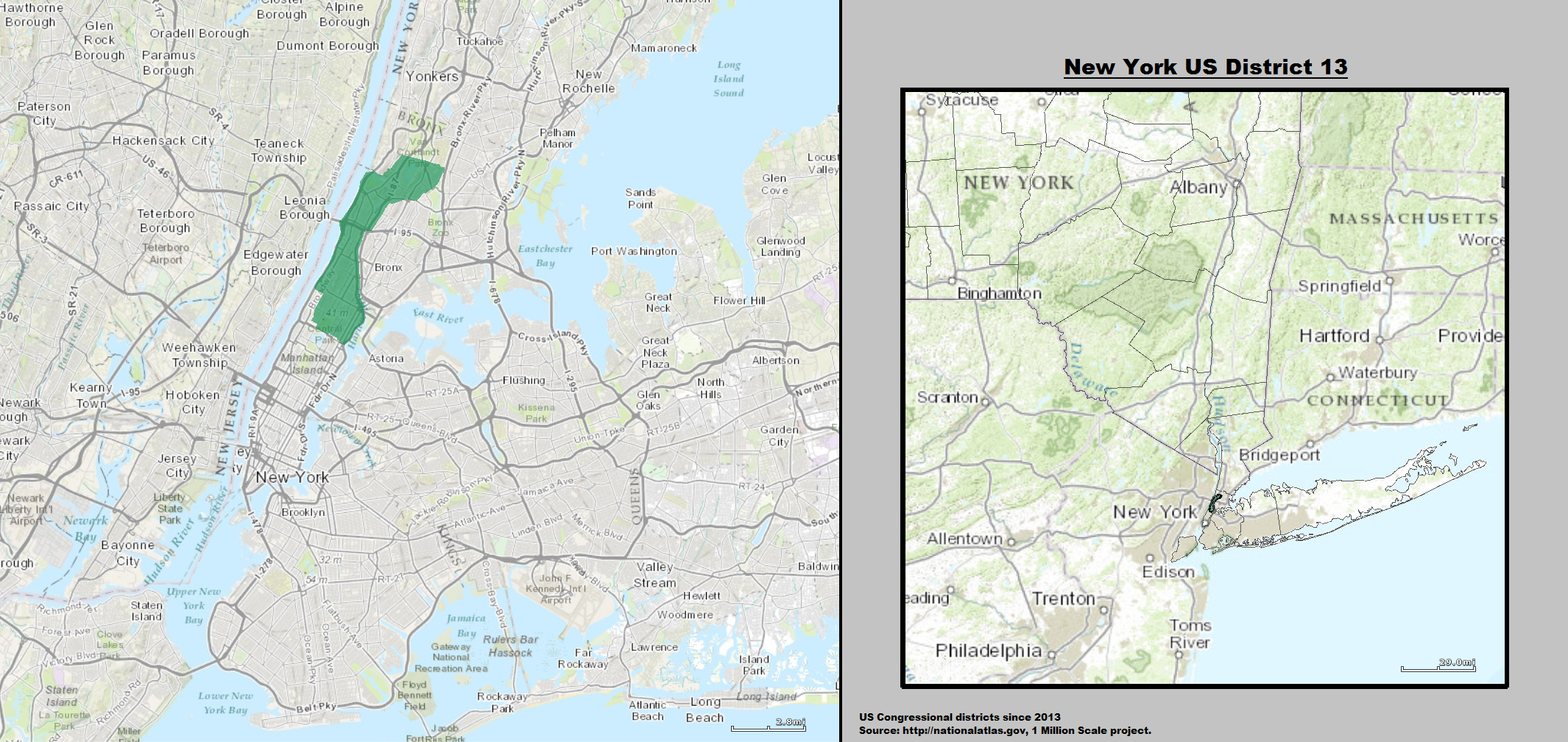
The district from 2013 to 2023

Various New York districts have been numbered "13" over the years, including areas in New York City and various parts of upstate New York.

1803–1809:

Montgomery

1847–1849:

Albany

1913–1945:

Parts of Manhattan

1945–1993:

Parts of Brooklyn

1993–2013:

All of Staten Island
Parts of Brooklyn

From 2003 to 2013, the district included all of Staten Island and the neighborhoods of Bay Ridge, Bensonhurst, Dyker Heights, and Gravesend in Brooklyn. Most of the territory in the old 13th district is now in New York's 11th congressional district.

2013–present:

Parts of Manhattan, The Bronx

== Current composition ==
The 13th district is located entirely in the New York City boroughs of The Bronx and Manhattan.

Bronx neighborhoods in the district include:

- Bedford Park
- Fordham
- Kingsbridge
- Kingsbridge Heights
- Morris Heights
- Van Cortlandt Village
- University Heights

Manhattan neighborhoods in the district include:

- East Harlem
- Hamilton Heights
- Harlem
- Inwood
- Manhattanville
- Marble Hill
- Morningside Heights
- Sugar Hill
- Washington Heights

== List of members representing the district ==
Member	Party	Years	Cong ress	Electoral history	District location
District established March 4, 1803
Thomas Sammons (Montgomery County)	Democratic-Republican	March 4, 1803 – March 3, 1807	8th 9th	Redistricted from the 9th district and re-elected in 1802. Re-elected in 1804. Lost re-election.	
Peter Swart (Schoharie)	Democratic-Republican	March 4, 1807 – March 3, 1809	10th	Elected in 1806. Retired.	
Uri Tracy (Oxford)	Democratic-Republican	March 4, 1809 – March 3, 1813	11th 12th	Redistricted from the 16th district and re-elected in 1808. Re-elected in 1810. [data missing]	
Alexander Boyd (Middleburg)	Federalist	March 4, 1813 – March 3, 1815	13th	Elected in 1812. Retired.	
John B. Yates (Utica)	Democratic-Republican	March 4, 1815 – March 3, 1817	14th	Elected in 1814. Retired.	
Thomas Lawyer (Cobleskill)	Democratic-Republican	March 4, 1817 – March 3, 1819	15th	Elected in 1816. Retired.	
Harmanus Peek (Schenectady)	Democratic-Republican	March 4, 1819 – March 3, 1821	16th		
Vacant		March 4, 1821 – December 3, 1821	17th	Elections were held in April 1821. It is unclear when results were announced or credentials issued.	
John Gebhard (Schoharie)	Federalist	December 3, 1821 – March 3, 1823	17th	Elected in 1821. Retired.	
Isaac Williams Jr. (Cooperstown)	Democratic-Republican	March 4, 1823 – March 3, 1825	18th	Elected in 1822. Retired.	
William G. Angel (Burlington)	Jacksonian	March 4, 1825 – March 3, 1827	19th	Elected in 1824. Retired.	
Samuel Chase (Cooperstown)	Anti-Jacksonian	March 4, 1827 – March 3, 1829	20th	Elected in 1826. Retired.	
William G. Angel (Burlington)	Jacksonian	March 4, 1829 – March 3, 1833	21st 22nd	Elected in 1828. Re-elected in 1830. Retired.	
Reuben Whallon (Split Rock)	Jacksonian	March 4, 1833 – March 3, 1835	23rd	Elected in 1832. Retired.	
Dudley Farlin (Warrensburg)	Jacksonian	March 4, 1835 – March 3, 1837	24th	Elected in 1834. Retired.	
John Palmer (Plattsburg)	Democratic	March 4, 1837 – March 3, 1839	25th	Elected in 1836. Retired.	
Augustus C. Hand (Elizabethtown)	Democratic	March 4, 1839 – March 3, 1841	26th	Elected in 1838. Lost re-election.	
Thomas A. Tomlinson (Keeseville)	Whig	March 4, 1841 – March 3, 1843	27th	Elected in 1840. Retired.	
Daniel D. Barnard (Albany)	Whig	March 4, 1843 – March 3, 1845	28th	Redistricted from the 10th district and re-elected in 1842. Lost re-election.	
Bradford R. Wood (Albany)	Democratic	March 4, 1845 – March 3, 1847	29th	Elected in 1844. Lost re-election.	
John I. Slingerland (Bethlehem)	Whig	March 4, 1847 – March 3, 1849	30th	Elected in 1846. Retired.	
John L. Schoolcraft (Kingston)	Whig	March 4, 1849 – March 3, 1853	31st 32nd	Re-elected in 1848. Re-elected in 1850. Retired.	
Russell Sage (Troy)	Whig	March 4, 1853 – March 3, 1855	33rd 34th	Elected in 1852. Re-elected in 1854. Retired.	
Russell Sage (Troy)	Opposition	March 4, 1855 – March 3, 1857	33rd 34th	Elected in 1852. Re-elected in 1854. Retired.	
Abram B. Olin (Troy)	Republican	March 4, 1857 – March 3, 1863	35th 36th 37th	Elected in 1856. Re-elected in 1858. Re-elected in 1860. Retired.	
John B. Steele (Kingston)	Democratic	March 4, 1863 – March 3, 1865	38th	Redistricted from the 11th district and re-elected in 1862. Lost renomination.	
Edwin N. Hubbell (Coxsackie)	Democratic	March 4, 1865 – March 3, 1867	39th	Elected in 1864. Lost re-election.	
Thomas Cornell (Rondout)	Republican	March 4, 1867 – March 3, 1869	40th	Elected in 1866. Lost re-election.	
John A. Griswold (Catskill)	Democratic	March 4, 1869 – March 3, 1871	41st	Elected in 1868. Retired.	
Joseph H. Tuthill (Ellenville)	Democratic	March 4, 1871 – March 3, 1873	42nd	Elected in 1870. Retired.	
John O. Whitehouse (Poughkeepsie)	Democratic	March 4, 1873 – March 3, 1877	43rd 44th	Elected in 1872. Re-elected in 1874. Retired.	
John H. Ketcham (Dover Plains)	Republican	March 4, 1877 – March 3, 1885	45th 46th 47th 48th	Elected in 1876. Re-elected in 1878. Re-elected in 1880. Re-elected in 1882. Redistricted to the 16th district.	
Egbert L. Viele (New York)	Democratic	March 4, 1885 – March 3, 1887	49th	Elected in 1884. Lost re-election.	
Ashbel P. Fitch (New York)	Republican	March 4, 1887 – March 3, 1889	50th 51st 52nd	Elected in 1886. Re-elected in 1888. Re-elected in 1890. Retired to run for Comptroller of New York City.	
Ashbel P. Fitch (New York)	Democratic	March 4, 1889 – March 3, 1893	50th 51st 52nd	Elected in 1886. Re-elected in 1888. Re-elected in 1890. Retired to run for Comptroller of New York City.	
John De Witt Warner (New York)	Democratic	March 4, 1893 – March 3, 1895	53rd	Redistricted from the 12th district and re-elected in 1892. [data missing]	
Richard C. Shannon (New York)	Republican	March 4, 1895 – March 3, 1899	54th 55th	Elected in 1894. Re-elected in 1896. Retired.	
Jefferson M. Levy (New York)	Democratic	March 4, 1899 – March 3, 1901	56th	Elected in 1898. Retired.	
Oliver Belmont (New York)	Democratic	March 4, 1901 – March 3, 1903	57th	Elected in 1900. Retired.	
Francis B. Harrison (New York)	Democratic	March 4, 1903 – March 3, 1905	58th	Elected in 1902. Retired to run for Lieutenant Governor of New York.	
Herbert Parsons (New York)	Republican	March 4, 1905 – March 3, 1911	59th 60th 61st	Elected in 1904. Re-elected in 1906. Re-elected in 1908. Lost re-election.	
Jefferson M. Levy (New York)	Democratic	March 4, 1911 – March 3, 1913	62nd	Elected in 1910. Redistricted to the 14th district.	
Timothy Sullivan (New York)	Democratic	March 4, 1913 – August 31, 1913	63rd	Elected in 1912 but never took seat due to ill health. Died.	
Vacant		August 31, 1913 – November 4, 1913	63rd		
George W. Loft (New York)	Democratic	November 4, 1913 – March 3, 1917	63rd 64th	Elected to finish Sullivan's term. Re-elected in 1914. Retired.	
Christopher D. Sullivan (New York)	Democratic	March 4, 1917 – January 3, 1941	65th 66th 67th 68th 69th 70th 71st 72nd 73rd 74th 75th 76th	Elected in 1916. Re-elected in 1918. Re-elected in 1920. Re-elected in 1922. Re-elected in 1924. Re-elected in 1926. Re-elected in 1928. Re-elected in 1930. Re-elected in 1932. Re-elected in 1934. Re-elected in 1936. Re-elected in 1938. Retired.	
Louis Capozzoli (New York)	Democratic	January 3, 1941 – January 3, 1945	77th 78th	Elected in 1940. Re-elected in 1942. Retired.	
Donald L. O'Toole (Brooklyn)	Democratic	January 3, 1945 – January 3, 1953	79th 80th 81st 82nd	Redistricted from the 8th district and re-elected in 1944. Re-elected in 1946. Re-elected in 1948. Re-elected in 1950. Lost re-election.	
Abraham J. Multer (Brooklyn)	Democratic	January 3, 1953 – December 31, 1967	83rd 84th 85th 86th 87th 88th 89th 90th	Redistricted from the 14th district and re-elected in 1952. Re-elected in 1954. Re-elected in 1956. Re-elected in 1958. Re-elected in 1960. Re-elected in 1962. Re-elected in 1964. Re-elected in 1966. Resigned to become a Justice on the New York Supreme Court.	
Vacant		January 1, 1968 – February 19, 1968	90th		
Bertram L. Podell (Brooklyn)	Democratic	February 20, 1968 – January 3, 1975	90th 91st 92nd 93rd	Elected to finish Multer's term. Re-elected in 1968. Re-elected in 1970. Re-elected in 1972. Lost renomination.	
Stephen Solarz (Brooklyn)	Democratic	January 3, 1975 – January 3, 1993	94th 95th 96th 97th 98th 99th 100th 101st 102nd	Elected in 1974. Re-elected in 1976. Re-elected in 1978. Re-elected in 1980. Re-elected in 1982. Re-elected in 1984. Re-elected in 1986. Re-elected in 1988. Re-elected in 1990. Redistricted to the 12th district and lost renomination.	
Susan Molinari (Staten Island)	Republican	January 3, 1993 – August 2, 1997	103rd 104th 105th	Redistricted from the 14th district and re-elected in 1992. Re-elected in 1994. Re-elected in 1996. Resigned to become a television journalist.	
Vacant		August 3, 1997 – November 3, 1997	105th		
Vito Fossella (Staten Island)	Republican	November 4, 1997 – January 3, 2009	105th 106th 107th 108th 109th 110th	Elected to finish Molinari's term. Re-elected in 1998. Re-elected in 2000. Re-elected in 2002. Re-elected in 2004. Re-elected in 2006. Retired.	
Vito Fossella (Staten Island)	Republican	November 4, 1997 – January 3, 2009	105th 106th 107th 108th 109th 110th	Elected to finish Molinari's term. Re-elected in 1998. Re-elected in 2000. Re-elected in 2002. Re-elected in 2004. Re-elected in 2006. Retired.	2003–2013; Staten Island, parts of Brooklyn
Michael McMahon (Staten Island)	Democratic	January 3, 2009 – January 3, 2011	111th	Elected in 2008. Lost re-election.	2003–2013; Staten Island, parts of Brooklyn
Michael Grimm (Staten Island)	Republican	January 3, 2011 – January 3, 2013	112th	Elected in 2010. Redistricted to the 11th district.	2003–2013; Staten Island, parts of Brooklyn
Charles Rangel (New York)	Democratic	January 3, 2013 – January 3, 2017	113th 114th	Redistricted from the 15th district and re-elected in 2012. Re-elected in 2014. Retired.	2013–2023; Parts of Manhattan, The Bronx
Adriano Espaillat (New York)	Democratic	January 3, 2017 – present	115th 116th 117th 118th 119th	Elected in 2016. Re-elected in 2018. Re-elected in 2020. Re-elected in 2022. Re-elected in 2024. Lost renomination.	2013–2023; Parts of Manhattan, The Bronx
Adriano Espaillat (New York)	Democratic	January 3, 2017 – present	115th 116th 117th 118th 119th	Elected in 2016. Re-elected in 2018. Re-elected in 2020. Re-elected in 2022. Re-elected in 2024. Lost renomination.	2023–2025; Parts of Manhattan, The Bronx
Adriano Espaillat (New York)	Democratic	January 3, 2017 – present	115th 116th 117th 118th 119th	Elected in 2016. Re-elected in 2018. Re-elected in 2020. Re-elected in 2022. Re-elected in 2024. Lost renomination.	2025–present Parts of Manhattan, The Bronx
Darializa Avila Chevalier (New York)	Democratic	Assuming office on January 3, 2027		Elected in 2026.	2025–present Parts of Manhattan, The Bronx

== Recent election results ==
In New York State electoral politics there are numerous minor parties at various points on the political spectrum. Certain parties will invariably endorse either the Republican or Democratic candidate for every office, hence the state electoral results contain both the party votes, and the final candidate votes (Listed as "Recap").

US House election, 1996: New York District 13
Party	Candidate	Votes	%	±%
Republican	Susan Molinari (incumbent)	94,660	61.6	
Democratic	Tyrone G. Butler	53,376	34.7	
Right to Life	Kathleen Marciano	3,396	2.2	
Independence	Anita Lerman	2,337	1.5	
Majority		41,284	26.8	
Turnout		153,769	100	

Special Election 1997: New York District 13
Party	Candidate	Votes	%	±%
Republican	Vito Fossella	79,838	61.3	−0.3
Democratic	Eric Vitaliano	50,373	38.7	+4.0
Majority		29,465	22.6	−4.2
Turnout		130,211	100	−15.3

US House election, 1998: New York District 13
Party	Candidate	Votes	%	±%
Republican	Vito Fossella (incumbent)	76,138	64.8	+3.5
Democratic	Eugene V. Prisco	40,167	34.2	−4.5
Independence	Anita Lerman	1,245	1.1	+1.1
Majority		35,971	30.6	+8.0
Turnout		117,550	100	−9.7

US House election, 2000: New York District 13
Party	Candidate	Votes	%	±%
Republican	Vito Fossella (incumbent)	109,806	64.6	−0.2
Democratic	Katina M. Johnstone	57,603	33.9	−0.3
Independence	Anita Lerman	2,653	1.6	+0.5
Majority		52,203	30.7	+0.1
Turnout		170,062	100	+44.7

US House election, 2002: New York District 13
Party	Candidate	Votes	%	±%
Republican	Vito Fossella (incumbent)	72,204	69.6	+5.0
Democratic	Arne M. Mattsson	29,366	28.3	−5.6
Independence	Anita Lerman	1,427	1.4	−0.2
Green	Henry J. Bardel	696	0.7	+0.7
Majority		42,838	41.3	+10.6
Turnout		103,693	100	−39.0

US House election, 2004: New York District 13
Party	Candidate	Votes	%	±%
Republican	Vito Fossella (incumbent)	112,934	59.0	−10.6
Democratic	Frank J. Barbaro	78,500	41.0	+12.7
Majority		34,434	18.0	−23.3
Turnout		191,434	100	+84.6

US House election, 2006: New York District 13
Party	Candidate	Votes	%	±%
Republican	Vito Fossella (incumbent)	59,334	56.8	−2.2
Democratic	Stephen A. Harrison	45,131	43.2	+2.2
Majority		14,203	13.6	−4.4
Turnout		104,465	100	−45.4

US House election, 2008: New York District 13
Party	Candidate	Votes	%	±%
Democratic	Michael McMahon	114,219	60.9	+17.7
Republican	Robert Straniere	62,441	33.3	−23.5
Conservative	Timothy Cochrane	5,799	3.1	+3.1
Independence	Carmine Morano	4,947	2.6	+2.6
Majority		51778	27.6	14.0
Turnout		187,406	100	+79.4

US House election, 2010: New York District 13
Party	Candidate	Votes	%	±%
Republican	Michael Grimm	65,024	51.3	+18.0
Democratic	Michael McMahon (incumbent)	60,773	48.0	−12.9
Libertarian	Tom Vendittelli	929	0.7	+0.7
Majority		4251	3.3	−24.3
Turnout		126,726	100	−32.4

US House election, 2018: New York District 13
Party	Candidate	Votes	%	±%
Democratic	Adriano Espaillat (incumbent)	180,035	94.6	
Republican	Jineea Butler	10,268	5.4	
Majority		169,767	89.2	
Turnout		190,303		

US House election, 2020: New York District 13
Party	Candidate	Votes	%
Democratic	Adriano Espaillat	202,916	79.6
Working Families	Adriano Espaillat	28,925	11.3
Total	Adriano Espaillat (incumbent)	231,841	90.9
Republican	Lovelynn Gwinn	19,829	7.8
Conservative	Christopher Morris-Perry	3,295	1.3
Total votes		254,965	100.0
Democratic hold			

US House election, 2024: New York District 13
Party	Candidate	Votes	%
Democratic	Adriano Espaillat (incumbent)	181,800	83.5
Republican	Ruben Vargas	32,071	14.7
Conservative	Ruben Vargas	3,751	1.7
Total	Ruben Vargas	35,822	16.5
Total votes		217,622	100.0
Democratic hold			

== See also ==
- List of United States congressional districts
- New York's congressional delegations
- New York's congressional districts
