= Stephen Solarz =

American politician

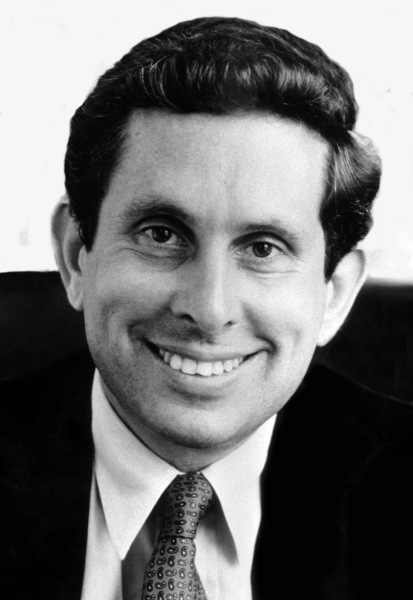

Member of the U.S. House of Representatives from New York's 13th district
- In office January 3, 1975 – January 3, 1993
- Preceded by: Bertram L. Podell
- Succeeded by: Nydia Velázquez (Redistricting)

Member of the New York State Assembly from the 45th district
- In office January 1, 1969 – December 31, 1974
- Preceded by: Max M. Turshen
- Succeeded by: Chuck Schumer

Personal details
- Born: Stephen Joshua Solarz; September 12, 1940 New York City, U.S.
- Died: November 29, 2010 (aged 70) Washington, D.C., U.S.
- Resting place: Congressional Cemetery
- Party: Democratic
- Spouse: Nina Koldin

Stephen Joshua Solarz (/ˈsoʊlɑːrz/; September 12, 1940 – November 29, 2010) was an American educator and politician who served as a United States representative from New York until his political career ended in the wake of the House banking scandal in 1992.

Solarz was active in international relations issues. In Congress, he was both an outspoken critic of President Ronald Reagan's deployment of Marines to Lebanon in 1982 and a cosponsor of the 1991 Gulf War Authorization Act during the presidency of George H. W. Bush.

== Early life and education ==
Born in Manhattan, New York City, Solarz attended public schools in New York City. He graduated from Midwood High School in 1958, and later received a B.A. from Brandeis University in 1962 and an M.A. in public law and government from Columbia University in 1967. Solarz taught political science at Brooklyn College during the 1967–1968 academic year.

== New York Assembly ==
In 1966, Solarz was the campaign manager for an anti-war campaign, for a U.S. House seat. He used that experience to make a successful run for the State Assembly two years later. He was a member of the New York State Assembly from 1969 to 1974, sitting in the 178th, 179th and 180th New York State Legislatures.

In the 1973 Democratic primary, Solarz ran against Sebastian Leone for Brooklyn borough president and lost. That was not unexpected since Solarz had run mostly for improved name recognition and to make political and fundraising contacts. In 1974, he was a delegate to the Democratic National Mid-term Convention.

== Career in Congress ==
=== Election and re-elections ===
In September 1974, Solarz defeated incumbent Democrat Bertram L. Podell in the Democratic primary for the New York 13th District. At the time, Podell was under federal indictment; he was later convicted. In November 1974, Solarz was elected to the U.S. House of Representatives, to the 94th Congress, beginning January 3, 1975. He was re-elected eight more times, serving until January 3, 1993.

=== Involvement in foreign policy ===
On July 18, 1980, Solarz became the first American public official to visit North Korea since the end of the Korean War, and the first to meet with Kim Il-sung. In the 1980s, he chaired the Asian and Pacific Affairs Subcommittee of the House Foreign Affairs Committee, an area of growing interest to America in that decade. He is remembered for his leadership on the Philippines, and had departed Manila just as Benigno S. Aquino Jr. was coming home to challenge dictator President Ferdinand E. Marcos. After Aquino's assassination, Solarz immediately returned with his wife to Manila for the wake and funeral, then began pushing President Reagan’s administration to distance itself from the Marcos government. Shortly after Marcos had fled to exile in Hawaiʻi after his ouster in the 1986 People Power Revolution, Solarz visited Malacañang Palace and publicized First Lady Imelda Marcos's massive shoe collection. He then worked closely with Aquino's widow and the new President, Corazon, who dubbed Solarz the "Lafayette of the Philippines."

Solarz also had strong ties to India and was held in high esteem by Indian leaders across the political spectrum. His motivations were partly driven by the presence of prosperous Indian Americans in his district. He visited India dozens of times during and after his Congressional term, once receiving a standing ovation on the floor of the Indian Parliament as has happened to only a few other Westerners such as presidents Bill Clinton and John F. Kennedy. He received bipartisan credit for having helped set the stage for substantial improvements in U.S.-India relations since the 1990s.

In 1982 and 1986, Solarz met with Iraqi president Saddam Hussein. In 1998, he co-signed, along with several neoconservative intellectuals, an open letter sent to President Clinton, declaring that Saddam still held chemical and biological weapons and had no intention to give them up. The open letter went on to urge President Clinton to use military force to overthrow Saddam.

=== 1992 primary loss ===
The round of redistricting following the 1990 Census divided his district into six pieces, reflecting his cold relations with many state lawmakers in Albany. After conducting extensive polling, Solarz decided that rather than challenge Democratic incumbent Ted Weiss or Republican incumbent S. William Green, he would seek election to the open seat in the heavily-Hispanic 12th congressional district. Solarz entered the race damaged by the House banking scandal, having written 743 overdrafts; he was not charged, but his wife pleaded guilty to two criminal charges of writing bad checks on their joint account. Solarz was defeated in the Democratic primary by Nydia Velázquez. Neither Weiss nor Green were re-elected, as Weiss died before the election and was replaced on the ballot by Jerrold Nadler, while Green was defeated by Democrat Carolyn Maloney.

== Post-Congressional career ==
In 1993, Solarz was appointed as chairman of the U.S. government-funded Central Asian-American Enterprise Fund by President Bill Clinton to bring private sector development to Central Asia. He remained in this role until 1998.

In 1994, Solarz was a leading candidate for United States Ambassador to India. However, Solarz was forced to withdraw from consideration after scrutiny of his efforts to obtain a visa for Albert Yeung, a Hong Kong businessman with a criminal record. Solarz's poor relations with members of the United States Foreign Service and the New York State political establishment were also identified as causes behind the failure of his nomination. The post instead went to Frank G. Wisner.

From 1994 to his death, Solarz remained active with the National Democratic Institute for International Affairs. He was also a member of the Intellibridge Expert Network and of the executive committee of the International Crisis Group. Along with Zbigniew Brzezinski, Solarz served as co-chairman of the American Committee for Peace in the Caucasus.

Solarz served on the board of directors of the National Endowment for Democracy from 1992 to 2001, and was awarded its Democracy Service Medal on retirement. He was also a founding member of the board of directors of the Hollings Center for International Dialogue, helping to establish the organization's presence in Turkey, and served until his death in 2010.

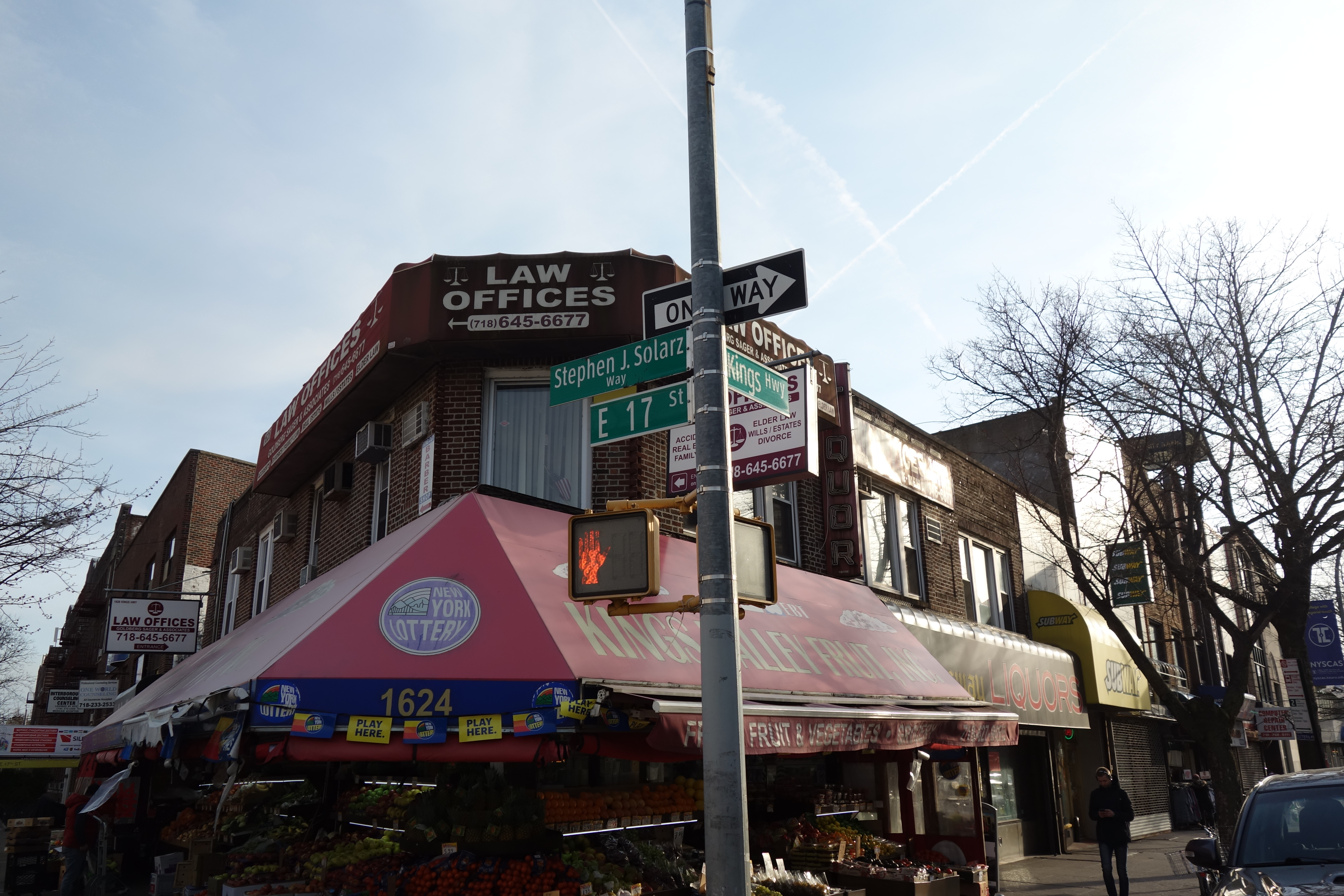
Stephen J. Solarz Way

== Awards ==
- Democracy Service Medal (2001), National Endowment for Democracy

== Death ==
Solarz died of esophageal cancer at the age of 70 on November 29, 2010, at George Washington University Hospital in Washington, D.C. He is buried at the Congressional Cemetery in the Hill East neighbourhood of Washington, D.C.

== See also ==
- List of Jewish members of the United States Congress

New York State Assembly
Preceded by Max M. Turshen	New York State Assembly; 45th District; 1969–1974	Succeeded by Chuck Schumer
U.S. House of Representatives
Preceded by Bertram L. Podell	Member of the U.S. House of Representatives from New York's 13th congressional district 1975–1993	Succeeded by Susan Molinari
