= Thomas Sammons (politician) =

American politician (1762–1838)

Member of the U.S. House of Representatives from New York
- In office March 4, 1803 – March 3, 1807
- Preceded by: District established
- Succeeded by: Peter Swart
- Constituency: 13th district
- In office March 4, 1809 – March 3, 1813
- Preceded by: Killian K. Van Rensselaer
- Succeeded by: John Lovett
- Constituency: 9th district

Personal details
- Born: October 1, 1762
- Died: November 20, 1838 (aged 76) Johnstown, New York, U.S.
- Party: Democratic-Republican
- Other political affiliations: Federalist (1809–1811)
- Parent: Sampson Sammons (father)
- Relatives: John H. Starin (grandson)

Thomas Sammons (October 1, 1762 – November 20, 1838) was a United States representative from New York.

The son of Sampson Sammons and Rachel Schoomaker, Sammons was born in Ulster County. He attended the rural schools, served as an officer in the Revolutionary War, and engaged in agricultural pursuits. He was a delegate to the New York State Constitutional Convention of 1801, and served as lieutenant, captain, and major in the State militia.

Sammons was elected as a Democratic-Republican to the 8th and 9th United States Congresses, holding office from March 4, 1803, to March 3, 1807. He was elected as a Federalist to the 11th, and as a Democratic-Republican to the 12th United States Congress, holding office from March 4, 1809, to March 3, 1813.

Afterwards he resumed his agricultural pursuits and died on the Sammons homestead in Montgomery County (near Johnstown). Interment was on the homestead in the Simeon Sammons Cemetery.

== See also ==
- United States House of Representatives elections in New York, 1802
- United States House of Representatives elections in New York, 1804
- United States House of Representatives elections in New York, 1808
- United States House of Representatives elections in New York, 1810

== Sources ==
- United States Congress. "Thomas Sammons (id: S000023)". Biographical Directory of the United States Congress.

U.S. House of Representatives
New district	Member of the U.S. House of Representatives from New York's 13th congressional district 1803–1807	Succeeded by Peter Swart
Preceded by Killian K. Van Rensselaer	Member of the U.S. House of Representatives from New York's 9th congressional district 1809–1813	Succeeded by John Lovett
