= Homer Dodge Martin =

American painter (1836–1897)

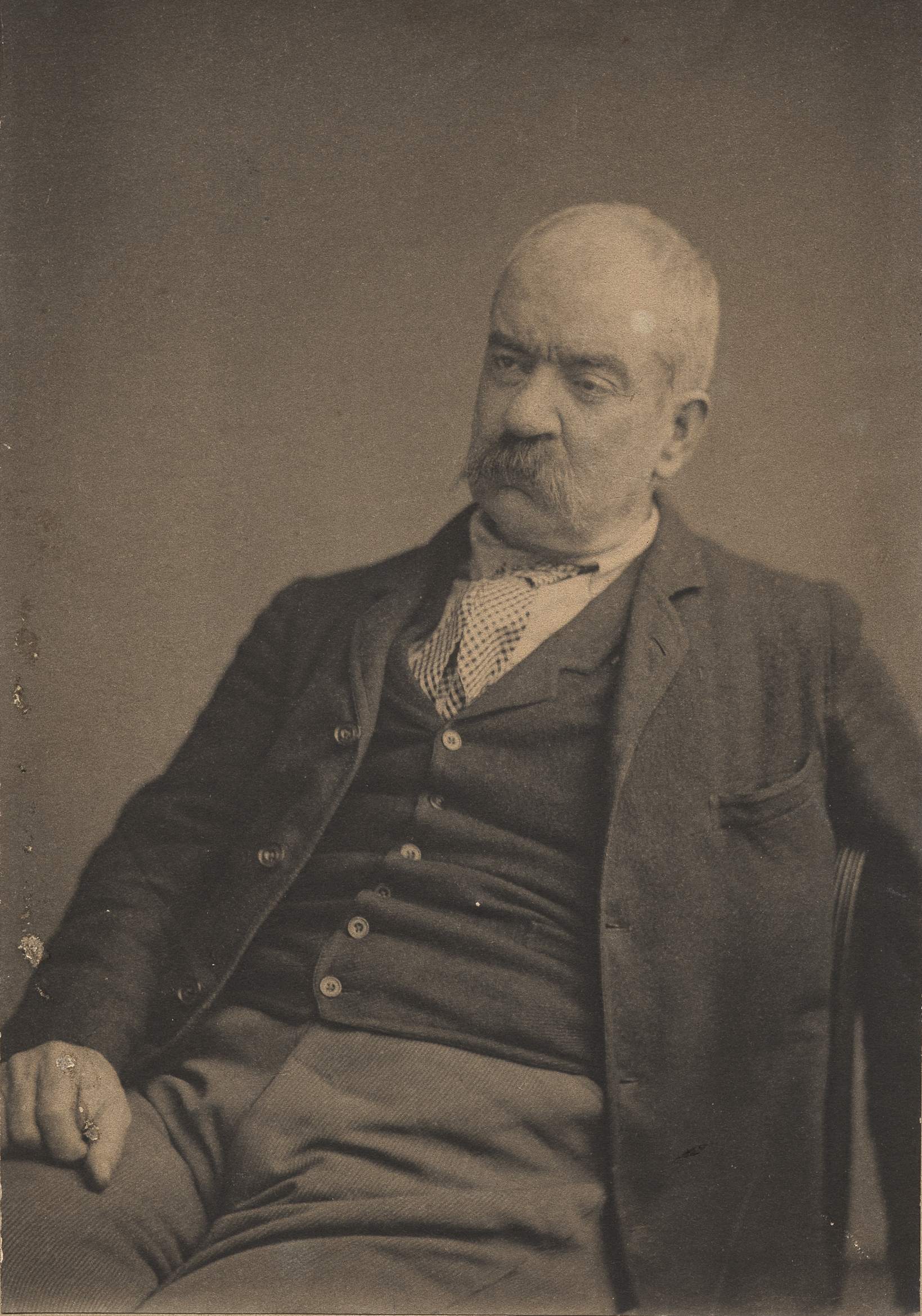
- Homer Dodge Martin
- Born: October 28, 1836; Albany, New York
- Died: February 12, 1897 (aged 60); St. Paul, Minnesota
- Known for: painter
- Spouse: Elizabeth Gilbert Davis Martin
- Elected: National Academy of Design

Homer Dodge Martin (October 28, 1836 – February 12, 1897) was an American artist, particularly known for his landscape paintings. Examples of Martin's work are in many important American museums.

== Biography ==
Martin was born in Albany, New York on October 28, 1836, the fourth and youngest son of Homer Martin and Sarah Dodge. A pupil for a short time of William Hart, his earlier work was closely aligned with the Hudson River School. Other Albany painters of his acquaintance included George Boughton, and Edward Gay.

During the 1860s he spent the summers in the Adirondacks, Catskills and White Mountains, and painted landscapes from the sketches he made there at his studio in New York City's Tenth Street Studio Building.

On June 25, 1861 he married Elizabeth Gilbert Davis, also of Albany.

Martin was elected as associate of the National Academy of Design, New York, in 1868, and a full academician in 1874. During a trip to Europe in 1876, he was captivated by the Barbizon school and the Impressionists, and thereafter his painting style gradually became darker, moodier, and more loosely brushed.

From 1882 to 1886, he lived in France, spending much of the time in Normandy, including stays at the Etaples art colony. His work there included a topographical view of the harbor in which a wooden-hulled ship is being built in the distance and a steam ship is seen moored on the quays. The rather more atmospheric Cottage in the Forest captures the effect of the parting sun on the dune landscape. At Villerville on the Seine, he painted his celebrated Harp of the Winds, now at the Metropolitan Museum of Art.

By 1887 Martin had returned to New York City. In 1893, poverty and poor health induced him to relocate to St. Paul, Minnesota, where he had relatives. There, nearly blind, he painted one of his best-known works, Adirondack Scenery (1895) from memory. He died on February 12, 1897, in St. Paul. Although never successful within his lifetime, within two years of his death Adirondack Scenery sold for $5500 and Harp of the Winds (1895) was acquired by the Metropolitan Museum of Art.

== Collections ==
As well as being represented in the Metropolitan Museum of Art, Martin's paintings can be found in the collections of other important American museums including the Addison Gallery of American Art, the Smithsonian American Art Museum, the Albany Institute of History and Art, the Cleveland Museum of Art, the Portland Art Museum, the Yager Museum of Art & Culture and the Museum of Fine Arts, Boston.

== Gallery ==
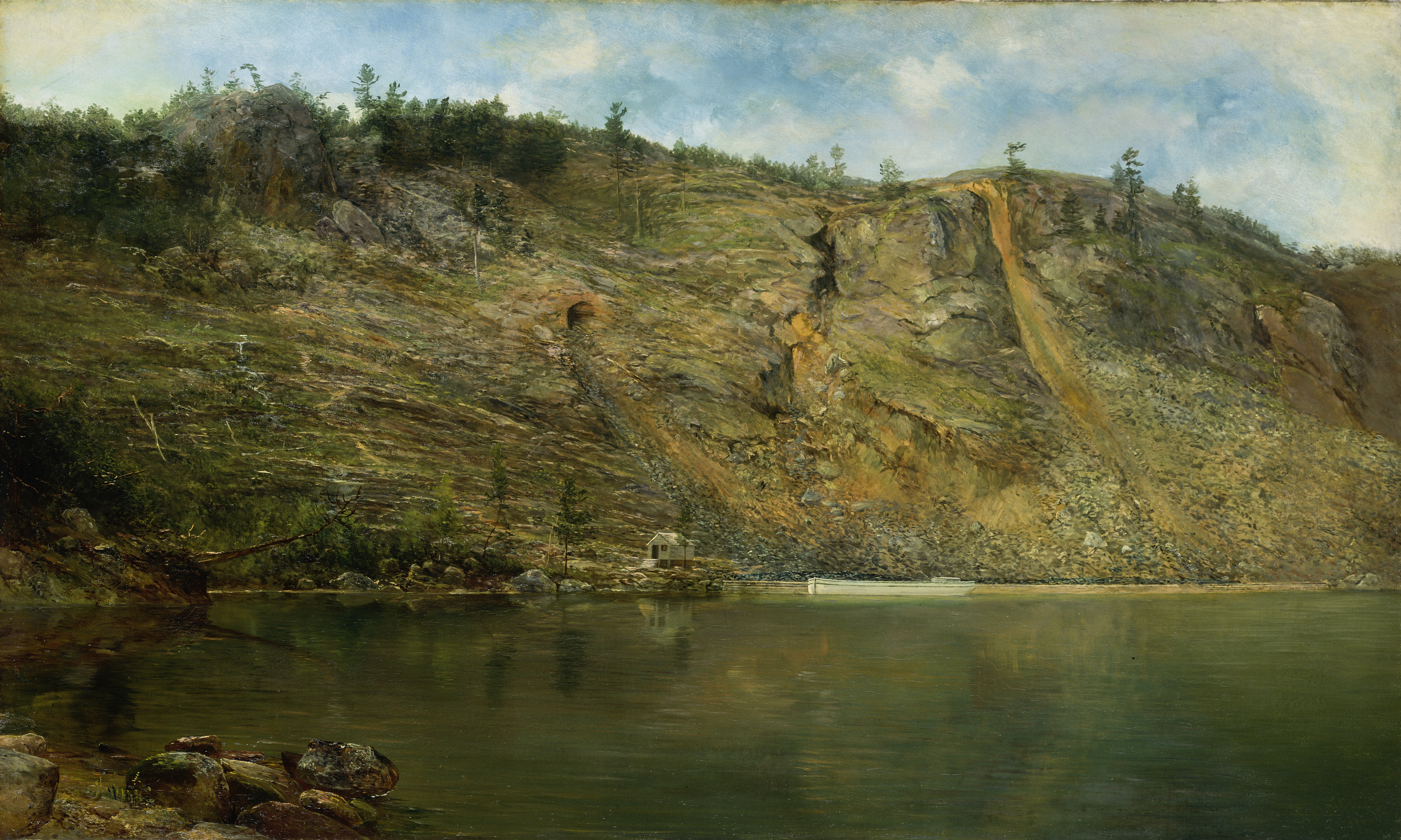
The Iron Mine, Port Henry, New York, (1862) oil on canvas mounted on fiberboard, in the Smithsonian American Art Museum

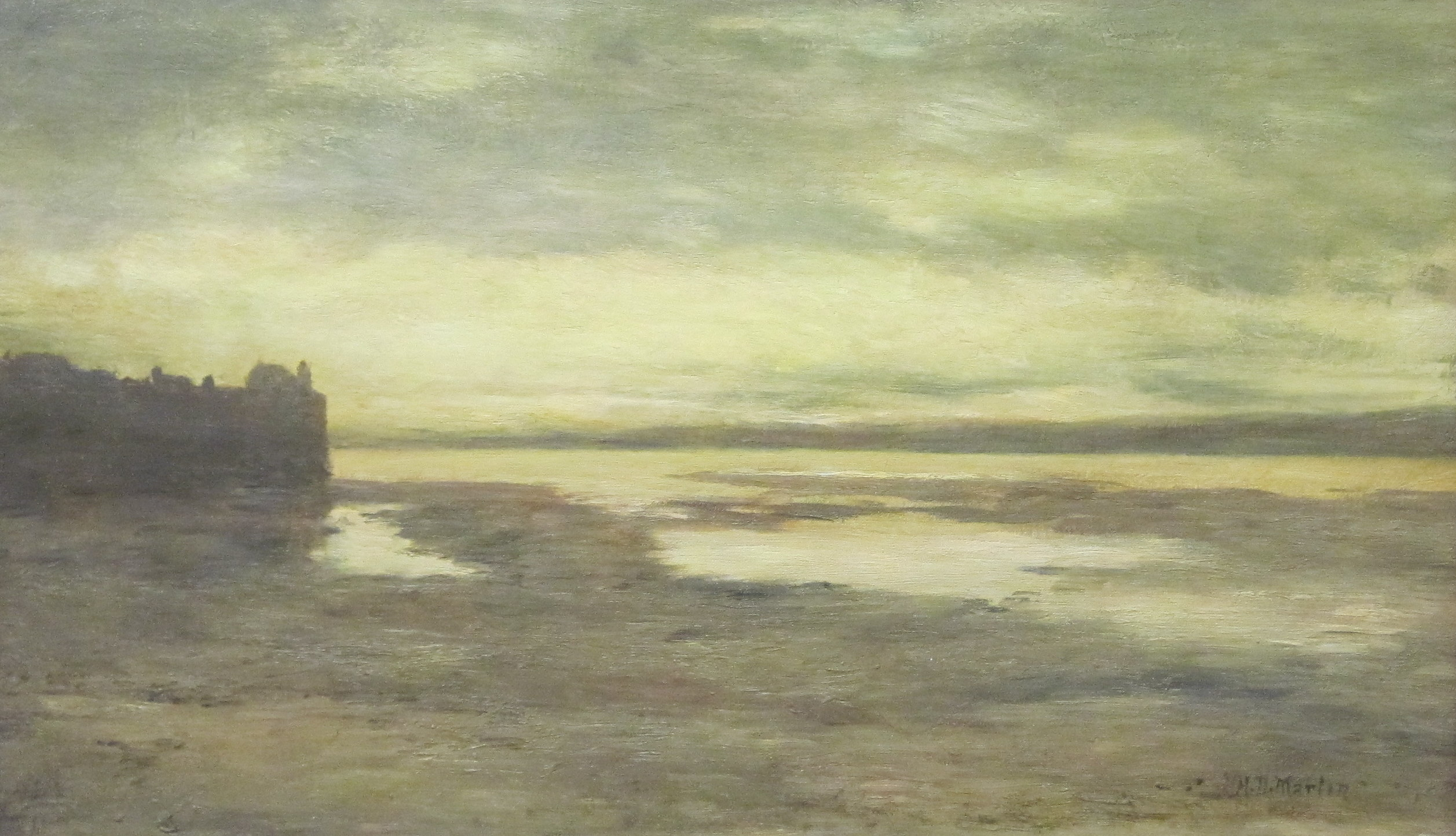
Evening on the Thames (c. 1876)

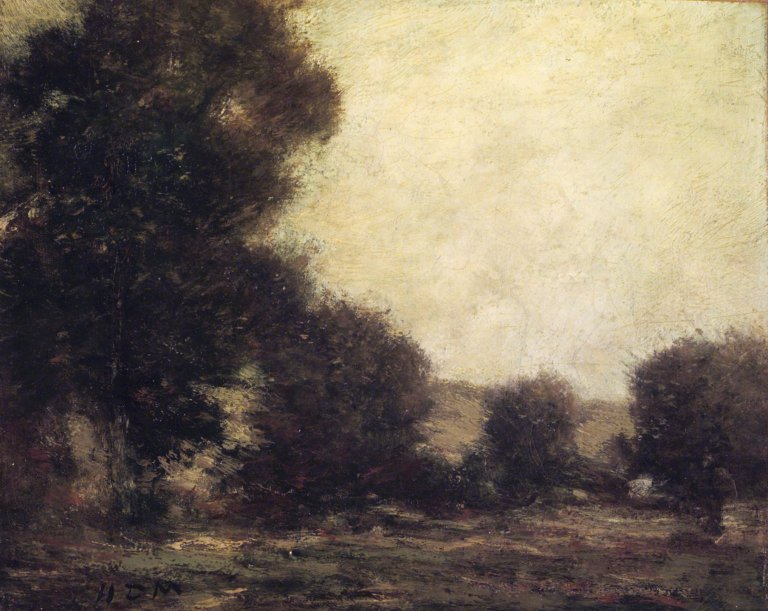
Effect of Trees (Between 1876 and 1882)

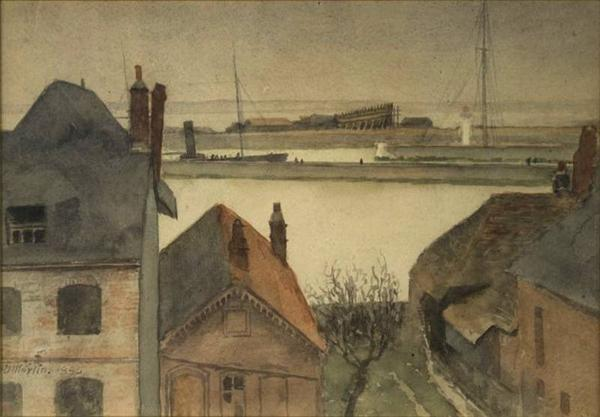
The harbour at Étaples (1884)

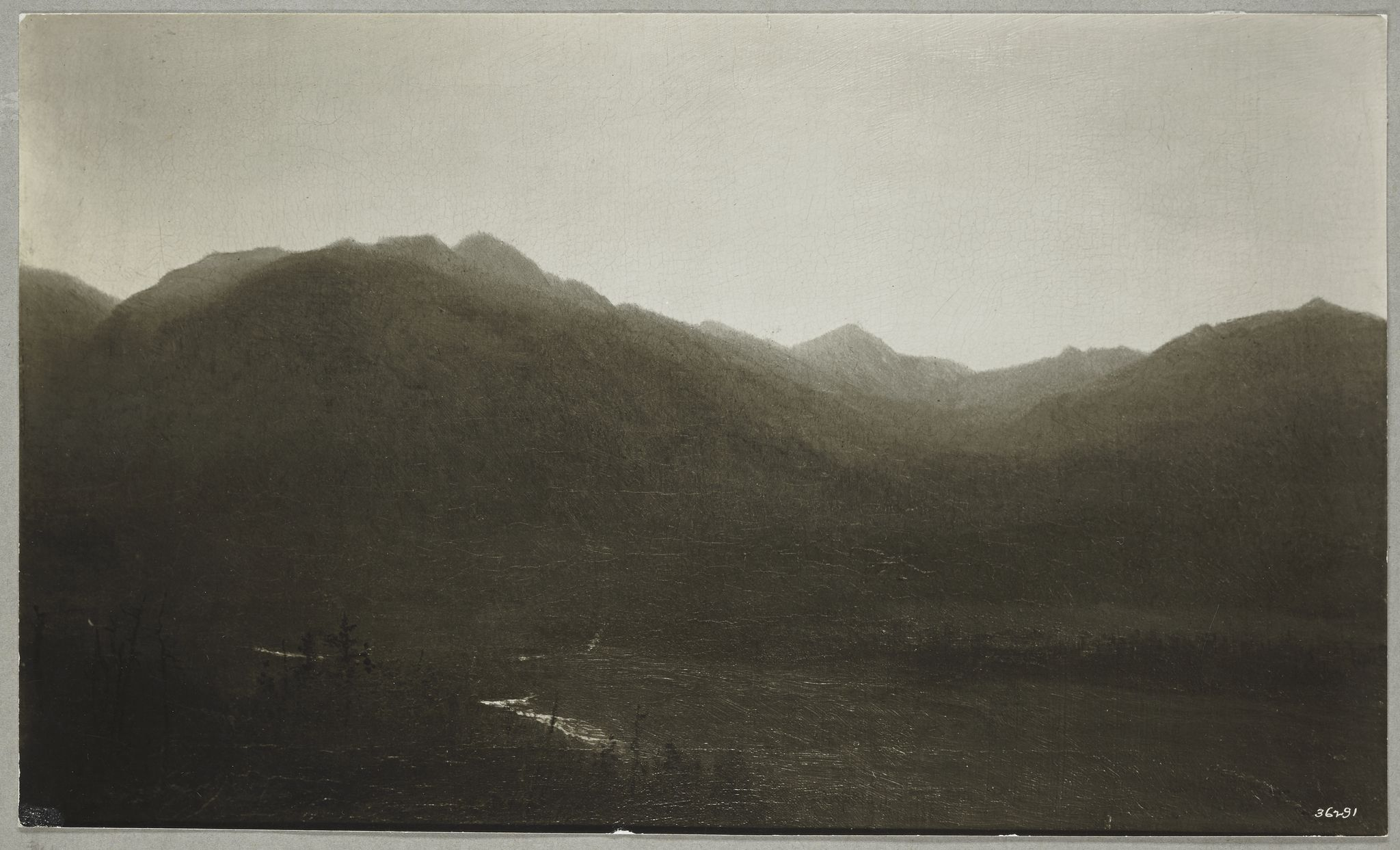
Ausable Valley and Mt. Marcy (1866), oil on canvas by Homer Dodge Martin found at the Frick Art Research Library Photoarchive
