= Thomas Lawyer =

American politician (1785–1868)

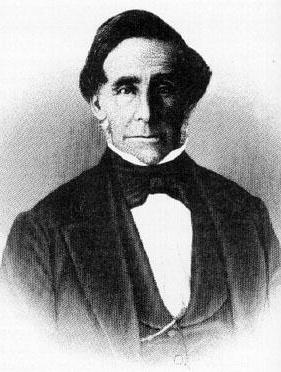

Member of the New York State Assembly
- In office January 1, 1846 – December 31, 1846 Serving with Thomas Smith
- Preceded by: Seymour Boughton, Henry Tibbets
- Succeeded by: Elisha Hammond, Thomas Smith
- Constituency: Schoharie County

District Attorney of Schoharie County, New York
- In office February 4, 1822 – October 10, 1831
- Preceded by: David F. Sacia
- Succeeded by: Jacob Houck Jr.

Member of the U.S. House of Representatives from New York's 13th district
- In office March 4, 1817 – March 3, 1819
- Preceded by: John B. Yates
- Succeeded by: Harmanus Peek

Member of the New York State Assembly
- In office July 1, 1815 – June 30, 1816 Serving with Peter A. Hilton, William C. Bouck
- Preceded by: William C. Bouck, William Dietz
- Succeeded by: Isaac Barber, Peter A. Hilton, Aaron Hubbard
- Constituency: Schoharie County

Personal details
- Born: October 14, 1785 Schoharie, New York, US
- Died: May 21, 1868 (aged 82) Lawyersville, New York, US
- Resting place: Cobleskill Rural Cemetery, Cobleskill, New York, US
- Party: Democratic-Republican; Democratic
- Spouse: Sarah "Sally" Hall Tiffany (m. 1805)
- Children: 8
- Profession: Attorney

Military service
- Allegiance: United States; New York
- Service: New York State Militia
- Years of service: 1820s–1830s
- Rank: Major General
- Commands: 133rd Regiment, 28th Brigade, 16th Division; 28th Brigade, 16th Division; 16th Division

Thomas Lawyer (October 14, 1785 – May 21, 1868) was an American politician and lawyer from Lawyersville, New York. A member of the Democratic-Republican Party, he served in the United States House of Representatives from 1817 to 1819.

== Life ==
Lawyer was born in Schoharie, New York on October 14, 1785, a son of Johannes Lawyer and Anna (Bouck) Lawyer. He was educated in Schoharie County, studied law with George Tiffany of Schoharie, was admitted to the bar, and practiced in Schoharie County. In February 1805, he married Sarah "Sally" Hall Tiffany. They were married until her death in 1864 and were the parents of eight children.

A Democratic-Republican, he was a member of the New York State Assembly in 1816. Lawyer was a longtime member of the state militia and attained the rank of colonel as commander of the 133rd Regiment, brigadier general as commander of the 28th Brigade, and major general as commander of the 16th Division.

In 1816, Lawyer was elected to the 15th United States Congress, and he served one term, March 4, 1817 to March 3, 1819. He was District Attorney of Schoharie County from 1822 to 1831. Lawyer served again in the state assembly in 1846, this time as a Democrat.

Lawyer died in Lawyersville, New York on May 21, 1868. He was buried at Cobleskill Rural Cemetery in Cobleskill.

U.S. House of Representatives
Preceded by John B. Yates	Member of the U.S. House of Representatives from New York's 13th congressional district 1817–1819	Succeeded by Harmanus Peek
