= Sampson Sammons =

Colonel Sampson Sammons (December 24, 1722 – October 17, 1796) was an American officer in the American Revolutionary War. He is notable for being the target of the first shot fired by the British in the American Revolution west of the Hudson River.

== Life ==
Sammons, of Dutch extraction, was born in the Greenwich Village neighborhood of Manhattan, New York to Jacob Sampson and Catalyntje Bensen. He moved to Ulster County in 1769, and then to Tryon County. In 1772 he was a Deacon of the First Reformed Church of Caughnawaga in Fonda, New York. He married Rachel Schoonmaker (1726-1822), who was a descendant of Hendrick Jochemson Schoonmaker, a native of Hamburg, Germany. They had three sons and seven daughters.

== Role in the American Revolution ==
In 1775, before the departure of Guy Johnson, nephew of Sir William Johnson, along with Loyalists and Native Americans to Canada, Sammons and other patriots formed a Committee of Safety for Tryon County to track movements of the British.

It is said that the first shot of the Revolution west of the Hudson River was fired at Sammons by Tory Sheriff of Johnstown Alexander White, after Sammons led a group of patriots to free neighbor John Fonda from the nearby jail.

In 1780 Sammons, along with sons Jacob, Frederick and Thomas, were all taken prisoner as a result of the raid from Canada led by Sir John Johnson and over 500 British troops. Sammons and Thomas were subsequently released, but his other two sons and horses were taken back to Canada. Frederick was kept as a prisoner of war in chains in Fort Chambly in Quebec for nearly 18 months.

Sammons served during the war at the Battle of Oriskany and the Battle of Klock's Field. He held the rank of Lieutenant of Exempts under Captain Jellis Fonda.

After the departure of Johnson, Sammons took the opportunity to lease Johnson Hall.

== Death and legacy ==
Sammons died in 1796 and was buried in the family's cemetery in Mohawk, New York.

Sammons's son Thomas Sammons participated in the New York State Constitutional Convention of 1801 and served four terms in Congress.

== Other Sources ==
- The Mohawk Valley During the Revolution, by Harold Frederic, 1877
- Sampson Sammons burial site
