= John Gebhard =

American politician

Member of the U.S. House of Representatives from New York's 13th district
- In office December 3, 1821 – March 3, 1823
- Preceded by: Harmanus Peek
- Succeeded by: Isaac Williams, Jr.

Personal details
- Born: February 22, 1782 Claverack, New York, U.S.
- Died: January 3, 1854 (aged 71) Schoharie, New York, U.S.
- Resting place: St. Paul's Lutheran Cemetery, Schoharie, New York, U.S.
- Party: Federalist

John Gebhard (February 22, 1782 – January 3, 1854) was an American lawyer and politician from New York.

== Life ==
Gebhard attended the public schools of Columbia County. He studied law with his brother Jacob, was admitted to the bar and practiced in Schoharie County. He was the county Surrogate from 1811 to 1813, and from 1815 to 1823.

In addition to practicing law, Gebhard farmed and was involved in several business ventures, including construction over the Schoharie Creek of the Middleburgh Bridge, which travelers paid tolls to use.

Gebhard was elected as a Federalist to the 17th United States Congress, holding office from December 3, 1821, to March 3, 1823. Afterwards he resumed the practice of law.

Gebhard was also an amateur geologist and mineralogist, and with his son John Gebhard, Jr. (1802-1887) was one of the first explorers of the limestone caves in and around Schoharie County, including Howe Caverns. Gebhard amassed a large personal collection of minerals found in the caves, and provided samples to other academics and researchers. John Gebhard, Jr. was later employed by the New York State Museum of Natural History, to which his family later sold the senior Gebhard's collection.

He was buried at St. Paul's Lutheran Cemetery in Schoharie. Gebhard's daughter Charlotte was the wife of Charles Goodyear, who also served in Congress.

U.S. House of Representatives
Preceded by Harmanus Peek	Member of the U.S. House of Representatives from New York's 13th congressional district 1821–1823	Succeeded by Isaac Williams, Jr.
