= John B. Yates =

American politician

Member of the U.S. House of Representatives from New York's 13th district
- In office March 4, 1815 – March 3, 1817
- Preceded by: Alexander Boyd
- Succeeded by: Thomas Lawyer

Personal details
- Born: February 1, 1784 Schenectady, New York
- Died: July 10, 1836 (aged 52) Chittenango, New York
- Party: Democratic-Republican Party
- Education: Union College
- Occupation: Attorney

John Barentse Yates (February 1, 1784 – July 10, 1836) was an American politician who was a U.S. Representative from New York.

Born in Schenectady, New York, Yates completed preparatory studies and was graduated from Union College at Schenectady in 1802. He studied law. He was admitted to the bar in 1805 and commenced practice in Schenectady. He served in the War of 1812 under Gen. Wade Hampton on the northern frontier and was subsequently appointed aide-de-camp to Gov. Daniel D. Tompkins.

Yates was elected as a Democratic-Republican to the Fourteenth Congress (March 4, 1815 – March 3, 1817). He served as chairman of the Committee on Expenditures in the Department of State (Fourteenth Congress). He did not seek renomination in 1816. Yates Aided in the construction of the Welland Canal. He moved to Chittenango, New York in 1816 where he later founded the Yates Polytechnic Institute in 1825. He was first judge of the Madison County Court from 1833 until his death.

Yates was a member of the New York State Assembly (Madison Co.) in 1836 and died in Chittenango, New York, on July 10, 1836. He was interred in Walnut Grove Cemetery, near Chittenango, New York.

Yates was a slave owner.

== Sources ==
- United States Congress. "John B. Yates (id: Y000009)". Biographical Directory of the United States Congress.

U.S. House of Representatives
Preceded by Alexander Boyd	Member of the U.S. House of Representatives from New York's 13th congressional district March 4, 1815 – March 3, 1817	Succeeded by Thomas Lawyer
