= Uri Tracy =

American politician from New York (1764–1838)

Uri Tracy (February 8, 1764 – July 21, 1838) was a United States representative from New York.

== Biography ==
He was born in Norwich, Connecticut on February 8, 1764, to Daniel Tracy and Mary Johnson, he graduated from Yale College in 1789 and became a Presbyterian clergyman and missionary to Native Americans. He moved to Oxford, New York in 1791, where he married Ruth Hovey, daughter of General Benjamin Hovey, on August 28, 1793. He would live in Oxford for the rest of his life.

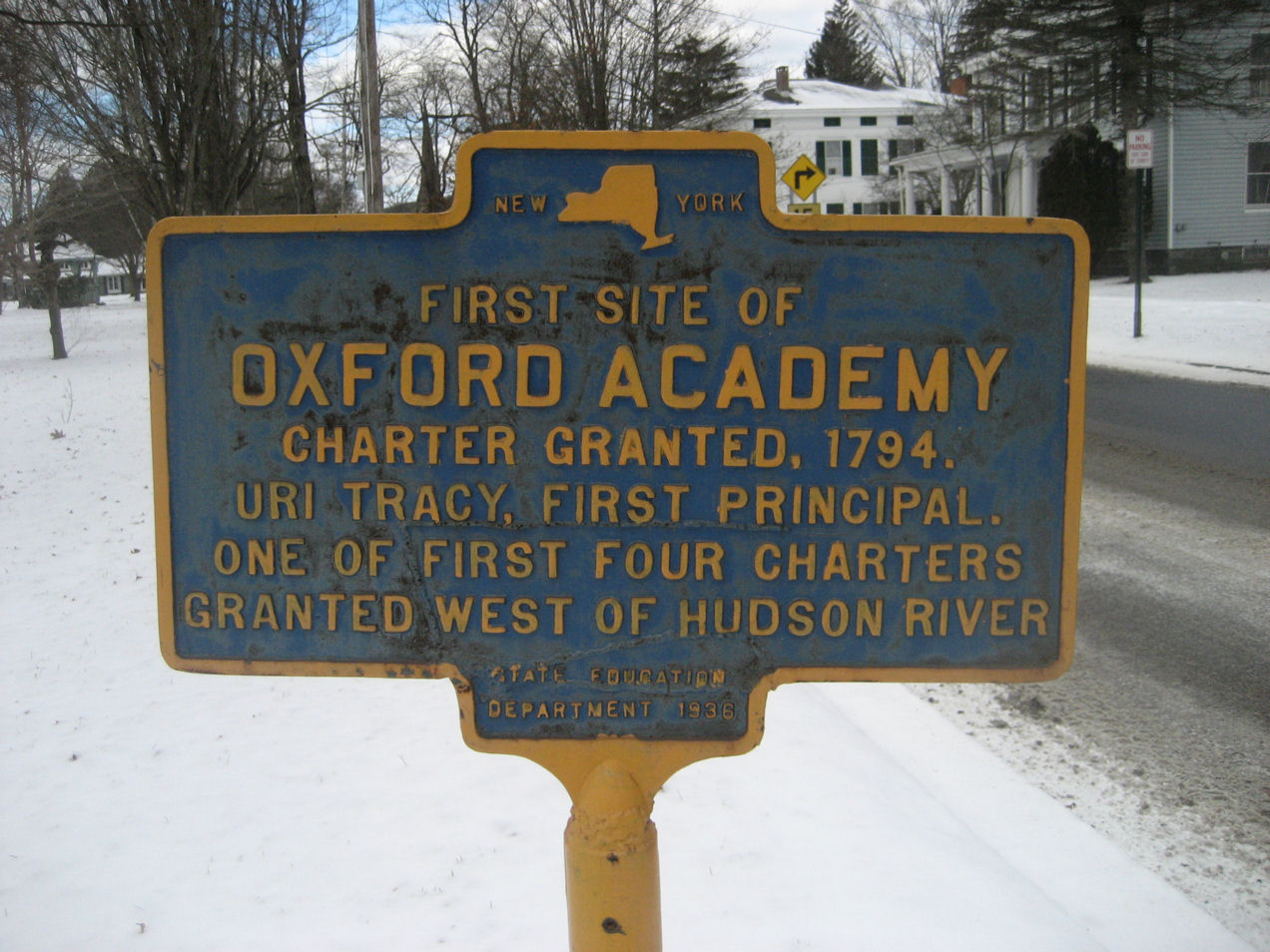
Historic marker of the first site of the Oxford Academy

Tracy held a number of prestigious positions during his time in Oxford: He was the first principal of Oxford Academy in 1794, as well as the first Sheriff of Chenango County, serving from 1798 until his resignation in August 1801. Tracy was elected county clerk and served from 1801 to 1815, becoming a member of the New York State Assembly in 1803. He was first Postmaster of Oxford, holding that position from 1802 to 1805, and was elected as a Democratic-Republican to the Ninth Congress, holding office from March 4, 1805, to March 3, 1807. Two years later, Tracy was elected to the Eleventh and Twelfth Congresses, holding office from March 4, 1809, to March 3, 1813. He was appointed first Judge of Chenango County, New York on July 8, 1819, and served until February 1823. Tracy died in Oxford, New York in 1838; his interment was in Riverview Cemetery in Oxford.

A tribute song, entitled "Lord Uri Tracy", was sung as the Oxford Academy school song until the 1960s. This song was performed at the Oxford Historical Society on August 11, 2011, and can be viewed on Video on YouTube.

U.S. House of Representatives
| Preceded by John Paterson | Member of the U.S. House of Representatives from New York's 16th congressional district 1805–1807 | Succeeded by Reuben Humphrey |
| Preceded by Peter Swart | Member of the U.S. House of Representatives from New York's 13th congressional district 1809–1813 | Succeeded by Alexander Boyd |
