= James Montgomery Bailey =

American humorist (1841–1894)

James Montgomery Bailey (September 25, 1841 – March 4, 1894) was an American journalist who won an ephemeral popularity as the "Danbury News Man."

== Biography ==
He was born at Albany, New York, and after receiving a common school education, learned the trade of a carpenter. He removed to Danbury, Conn., in 1860, and worked at his trade for the two following years, but found time to write occasionally for the newspapers. During the Civil War he served in the Seventeenth Connecticut Volunteers. In 1870, he established the Danbury News, for which he wrote the humorous sketches, sometimes original, often simply descriptive of commonplace happenings, which won for him a national reputation and made his paper known throughout the country. An example of his ability to humorously depict domestic situations is 'Putting Up A Stovepipe', in which he described the husband/wife tensions caused by an unpleasant household chore. His first book. Life in Danbury, was published in 1873; it consisted of selections from his newspaper articles. His other publications were The Danbury News Man's Almanac (1873); They All Do It (1877); England from a Back Window (1878); Mr. Phillip's Goneness (1879); The Danbury Boom; with a Full Account of Mr. Cobleigh's Action Therein (1880); and History of Danbury, Conn., 1684-1896.
