= Alexander Boyd =

American politician (1764–1857)

Member of the U.S. House of Representatives from New York's 13th district
- In office March 4, 1813 – March 3, 1815
- Preceded by: Uri Tracy
- Succeeded by: John B. Yates

Personal details
- Born: September 14, 1764 Albany, Province of New York, British America
- Died: April 8, 1857 (aged 92) Esperance, New York, U.S.
- Party: Federalist
- Spouse: Elizabeth Becker Boyd
- Children: Delia Boyd; John Boyd; Helen Boyd; David Boyd; Ann Boyd; Albert Barthalomew Boyd; Peter Boyd; James Boyd; Margaret Boyd; William Boyd; Nancy Boyd; Alexander Boyd; Hugh Boyd
- Profession: farmer; politician

Alexander Boyd (September 14, 1764 – April 8, 1857) was an American politician and a U.S. Representative from New York.

== Biography ==
Boyd was born in Albany in the Province of New York. He married Elizabeth Becker and they had thirteen children, Delia, John, Helen, David, Ann, Albert Barthalomew, Peter, James, Margaret, William, Nancy, Alexander, and Hugh.

== Career ==
Boyd moved to Middleburgh, New York and engaged in agricultural pursuits.

Elected as a Federalist to the 13th United States Congress, Boyd was United States Representative for the thirteenth district of New York from March 4, 1813, to March 3, 1815.

== Death ==
Boyd died in Esperance, New York, on April 8, 1857. He is interred at Schoharie Cemetery, Schoharie, New York.

U.S. House of Representatives
Preceded by Uri Tracy	Member of the U.S. House of Representatives from New York's 13th congressional district March 4, 1813 – March 3, 1815	Succeeded by John B. Yates
