= Kevin Graber =

American Professional Baseball Coach

Kevin Graber (born June 23, 1969 in Albany, New York) is an American baseball coach and coordinator in the Chicago Cubs organization. In 2023, he managed the Cubs' double A affiliate (Tennessee Smokies) to its first outright Southern League Championship in 45 years.

== Coaching career ==
Prior to joining the Cubs, Graber coached Phillips Academy Andover to five Central New England Prep Final Championships. His 2018, 2019, 2021, and 2022 teams ranked No. 1 in New England according to the New England Baseball Journal. Graber was named Northeast Region Coach of the Year by the American Baseball Coaches Association (ABCA) in 2018 and 2021 and New England Region Coach of the Year by the National High School Baseball Coaches Association (NHSBCA) in 2018 and 2022.

Graber's emergence with the Cubs marked a return to the pro ranks, having guided the Southern Minnesota Stars of the Prairie League of Professional Baseball to its lone division championship, earning league Manager of the Year honors in 1997. He then managed the Adirondack Lumberjacks in the Northeast League of Professional Baseball. Graber segued to the college ranks shortly thereafter, and his career in collegiate athletics administration and coaching included stops at Lassen College (Susanville, Calif.); Riverland Community College (Austin, Minn.); the University of West Alabama (Livingston, Ala.); and Amherst College (Amherst, Mass.), where he coached alongside current Yale University head coach Brian Hamm.

All the while, Graber spent summers coaching with the Bourne Braves of the prestigious Cape Cod Baseball League, after managing the Saratoga Phillies of the New York Collegiate Baseball League and the Electric City Giants of the Mountains Collegiate Baseball League (MCBL), earning MCBL Coach of the Year honors along the way.

He also coached a town team from Amherst, Massachusetts to an American Amateur Baseball Congress state championship in the 16-and-under Mickey Mantle Division in 2007.

== Playing career ==
As a college player, Graber transferred from Division I Winthrop University to The College of Saint Rose in his hometown of Albany, New York, where he twice earned first-team all-conference and all-region honors and helped lead the Golden Knights to berth in the 1990 NAIA World Series. After rebounding from a life-threatening cancer diagnosis and ensuing treatments, he managed to forge a playing career that included stops in Australia, Minnesota, and upstate New York, batting .311 as a middle infielder for the Prairie League's Southern Minnesota Stars in his best professional season.

== Honors & Awards ==
Graber was inducted into the Amsterdam Mohawks Hall of Fame in 2016, in recognition of a trio of all-star seasons (1988, 1989, and 1990) playing in the Northeastern Collegiate Baseball League.

== Education ==
Graber graduated from the College of Saint Rose. He earned a master's degree in education with a concentration in English from the University of Massachusetts Amherst.
