= Isaac Mitchell (writer) =

American writer (1759–1812)

Isaac Mitchell (c. 1759-1812) was an American writer and journalist, best known today as the author of the Gothic novel The Asylum, or Alonzo and Melissa.

== The Asylum ==
The Asylum was a popular work of Gothic fiction, and has been called "the single most popular Gothic novel in early America." It was first serialized in the Political Barometer, Mitchell's Poughkeepsie, New York newspaper, in 1804, and then expanded published in book form in 1811. It was then almost completely plagiarized in an edition attributed to Daniel Jackson, Jr., under whose name many copies were sold in the 19th century. Mitchell died before he could file suit against Jackson.

The pirated Jackson version went through at least twenty-five printings in the 19th century, and was a good seller into the early 20th century. In Life on the Mississippi (1883), Mark Twain identifies the book (referred to as Alonzo and Melissa as was common) as one that is still widely read, though most 19th century readers only read the second volume.

== Personal ==
Mitchell was born around Albany, New York in about 1759. He worked in the newspaper business from 1798 until he died from typhus on November 26, 1812.
