= Area Redevelopment Administration =

American rural poverty program (1963-1965)

The Area Redevelopment Administration was a rural poverty alleviation program of the Kennedy administration, primarily in Appalachia. It targeted 852 localities for redevelopment and provided assistance to an additional 106 communities with significant unemployment. The underlying causes of these areas' challenges included various factors such as the migration of industries, displacement of labor due to technological advancements, overreliance on declining sectors, influx of job-seekers, changing military procurement requirements, and persistent rural poverty. The designated areas experienced unemployment rates approximately 33 percent higher than the national average. Kennedy emphasized the importance of focusing on long-term solutions for addressing the economic issues faced by these communities, rather than solely addressing immediate unemployment concerns. While the 1961 act allocated $394 million to stimulate the private sector and create new jobs, an additional $4.5 million per year was reserved for vocational training programs over a span of four years.

== Kennedy's anti-poverty policies ==
Kennedy said little about poverty in his campaign, but began talking about unemployment in his first State of the Union address in January 1961. From his economic concerns, Kennedy created the Appalachian Regional Commission, VISTA, raised the minimum wage, and signed the Manpower Development and Training Act.

Journalism by Homer Bigart in 1962-1963 aroused Kennedy's concern for poverty in Appalachia, and he focused existing funds on pilot projects on the issue in 1963. In late 1963, Kennedy said "the time has come to organize a national assault on the causes of poverty, a comprehensive program." In October 1963, Kennedy was planning a trip to bring national attention to rural poverty.

The idea of the War on Poverty began emerging from the White House in 1963, but Congress was rejecting virtually all of Kennedy's domestic legislation proposals at the time. Kennedy strongly prioritized foreign policy in his concerns over his domestic agenda.

== Creation ==
Kennedy proposed and achieved passage of the Area Redevelopment Act, which provided federal funding to economically struggling regions of the country. The Area Redevelopment Act, a $394 million spending package passed in 1961, followed a strategy of investing in the private sector to stimulate new job creation. It specifically targeted businesses in urban and rural depressed areas and authorized $4.5 million annually over four years for vocational training programs.

=== Political impediments ===
On June 11, 1963, Kennedy delivered a Report to the American People on Civil Rights, proposing what became the Civil Rights Act of 1964. This aligned him with the civil rights movement, which he had earlier distanced himself from to avoid upsetting Southern legislators. Kennedy's action had the anticipated effect: a motion in the House of Representatives to boost funding to the Area Redevelopment Administration as requested by Kennedy suffered a surprising defeat, 209–204, because of the opposition of Southern Democrats. Their rejection of the bill was widely viewed as a revolt against the President for his stance on civil rights. In discussing the failure with House Majority Leader Carl Albert, Kennedy lamented, "Civil rights did it." When historian and presidential adviser Arthur M. Schlesinger Jr. complemented Kennedy on his remarks, the latter bitterly replied, "Yes, and look at what happened to area development the very next day in the House." He then added, "But of course, I had to give that speech, and I'm glad that I did."

=== Restructuring ===
The Public Works and Economic Development Act of 1965 reorganized the Areas Redevelopment Administration (ARA) into the Economic Development Administration (EDA), and authorized $3.3 billion over 5 years while specifying seven criteria for eligibility. The list included low median family income, but the 6% or higher unemployment applied to the greatest number of areas, while the Act also mentioned outmigration from rural areas as a criterion. In an attempt to go beyond what one writer described as "ARA’s failed scattershot approach" of providing aid to individual counties and inspired by the European model of regional development, the EDA encouraged counties to form Economic Development Districts (EDDs) as it was recognized that individual distressed counties (called RAs or Redevelopment Areas) lacked sufficient resources for their own development.
