= Harmanus Peek =

American politician (1782–1838)

- Born: June 24, 1782; Albany, New York, US
- Died: September 27, 1838; Schenectady, New York, US
- Education: Graduated from Union College (1804)
- Occupations: Lawyer, politician
- Known for: Member of the United States House of Representatives
- Predecessor: Thomas Lawyer
- Successor: John Gebhard
- Political party: Democratic-Republican

Harmanus Peek (June 24, 1782 Albany, New York – September 27, 1838 Schenectady, New York) was an American lawyer and politician from New York.

== Life ==
He graduated from Union College in 1804. Then he studied law, was admitted to the bar and commenced practice in Schenectady.

He was Schenectady's City Clerk from 1808 to 1818, and a member of the Schenectady County Board of Supervisors in 1810, 1813 to 1818, 1822 to 1826, and 1829 to 1832.

A member of the Democratic-Republican Party, he served in the New York State Assembly from 1816 to 1817.

In 1818 he was elected to the United States House of Representatives and served one term, 1819 to 1821. During his term Peek was Chairman of the Committee on Expenditures in the Department of State. He did not run for reelection, and resumed practicing law.

In 1833 he was elected Schenectady's first City Recorder, a position equivalent to a Deputy Mayor, and he served until 1835.

He was first buried at the Dutch Church Cemetery, and later re-interred in the Vale Cemetery, both in Schenectady.

== Sources ==
- United States Congress. "Harmanus Peek (id: P000183)". Biographical Directory of the United States Congress.
- The New York Civil List compiled by Franklin Benjamin Hough (pages 70, 192 and 296; Weed, Parsons and Co., 1858)

U.S. House of Representatives
Preceded by Thomas Lawyer	Member of the U.S. House of Representatives from New York's 13th congressional district 1819–1821	Succeeded by John Gebhard
