= Edward Gay (artist) =

Irish-American painter

Edward B. Gay
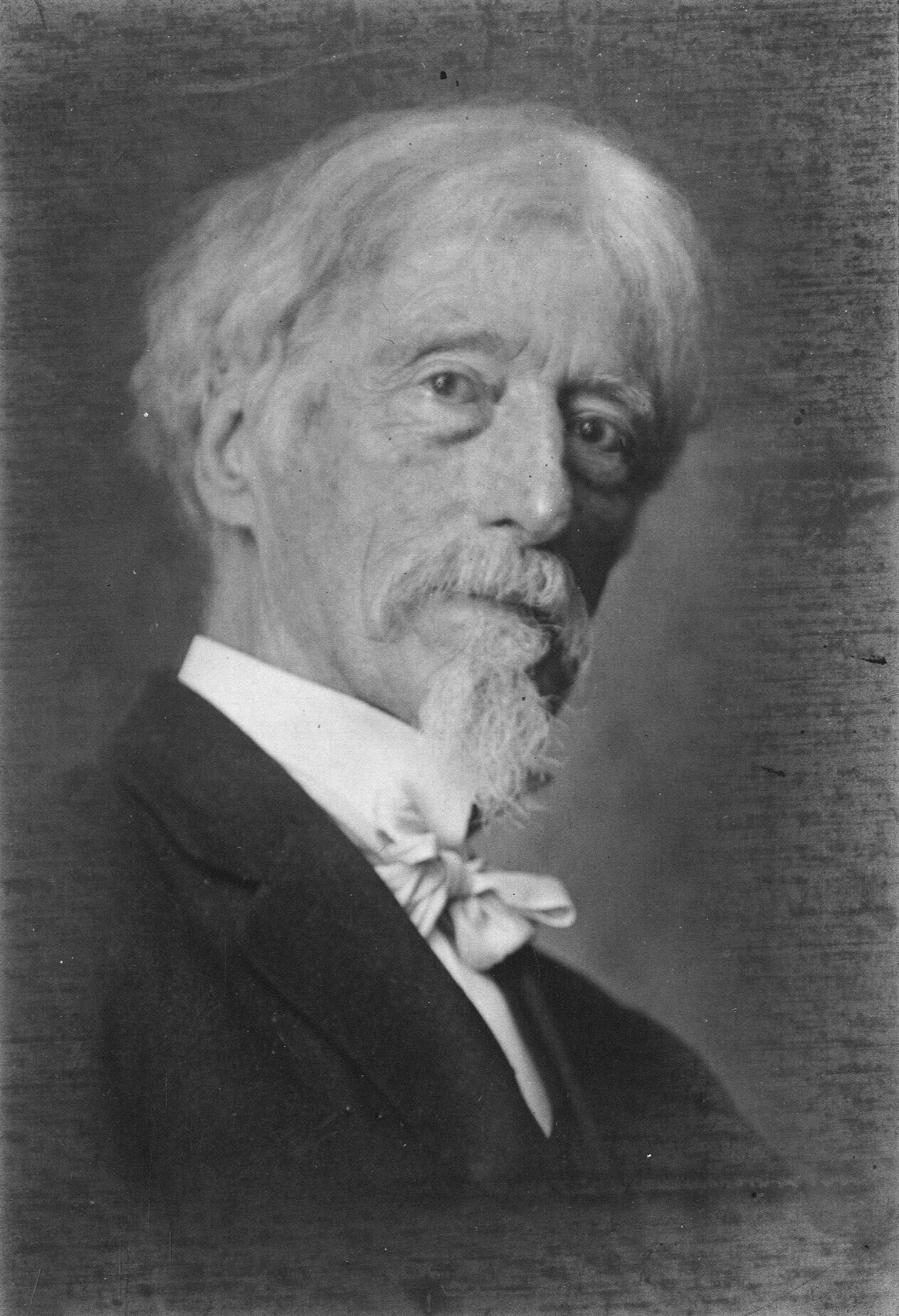
- Gay in 1917/1918
- Born: April 25, 1837; Marlinstown, Mullingar, Westmeath, Ireland
- Died: 1928 (aged 90–91); Mount Vernon, New York
- Burial place: Saint Paul's Church Cemetery, Mount Vernon, Westchester County, New York, United States of America
- Spouse: Martha Freary
- Parent(s): Richard Gay, Ellen Kilduff

Edward Gay (1837–1928) was an Irish-American artist who specialized in landscape paintings. He was active in Mt. Vernon, New York and Cragsmoor, New York.

== Biography and career ==
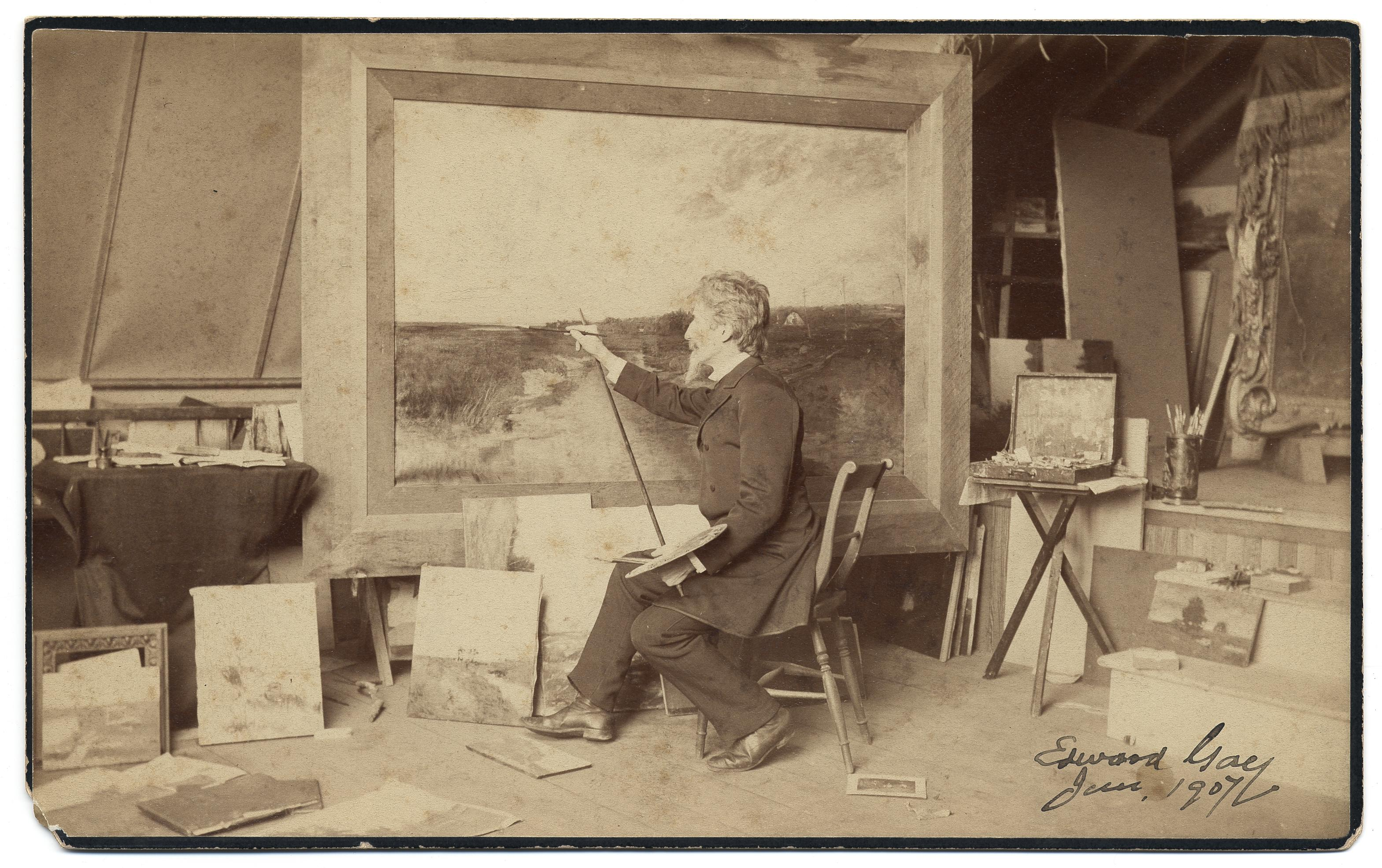
Gay at his easel in January 1907

The Great Famine of Ireland forced his family to move to America, when he was 11 years old. Gay trained in Albany on the advice of James Hart, his brother William Hart, and George Henry Boughton, artists who recognized Gay's talent while he was still a child.

In 1862, Gay went to Karlsruhe in Germany to continue his studies under the artists Johann Wilhelm Schirmer and Karl Friedrich Lessing. In 1864 he returned to the United States and dedicated himself to landscape painting.

Gay and his wife, Martha Freary, moved to Mt. Vernon, New York. The couple had a son, Duncan–also an artist–and a daughter, Ingovar.

Gay was a member of the New York Artists Fund Society, National Academy of Design, and the Lotos Club. He exhibited in museums and galleries throughout America and he painted murals for public libraries in Mt. Vernon, New York and Bronxville, New York.

Gay died in 1928 in Mount Vernon, New York.
