= Paul T. Kammerer Jr. =

American lawyer and politician

Paul Thomas Kammerer Jr. (July 4, 1886 – March 2, 1939) was an American lawyer and politician from New York.

== Life ==
Kammerer was born on July 4, 1886, in New York City, New York, the son of Paul T. and Mary F. Kammerer. He attended the College of the City of New York and Fordham University Law School. He then began practicing law as a member of the law firm Dyer & Kammerer on 51 Chambers St.

In 1923, Kammerer was elected to the New York State Assembly as a Democrat, representing the New York County 12th District. He served in the Assembly in 1924 and 1925. Governor Alfred E. Smith later appointed him a member of the Child Welfare Commission.

In 1929, Kammerer married Agnes Whelan of Elizabeth, New Jersey. They had a daughter, Julie. He was president of the Catholic Youth Organization, a director of the Center Association for Catholics, a governor of the New York Catholic Protectory, a consulter of the Xavier Alumni Sodality, and a member of the Friendly Sons of St. Patrick and the Catholic Club of New York. He was also a director of the New York County Lawyers Association and a member of the New York Bar Association.

Kammerer died at home from a heart ailment on March 2, 1939. He was buried in the Holy Sepulchre Cemetery in East Orange, New Jersey.

New York State Assembly
Preceded by John J. O'Connor	New York State Assembly; New York County, 12th District; 1924–1925	Succeeded by John A. Byrnes
