= William Bourke Cockran =

Irish-American politician (1854–1923)

William B. Cochran
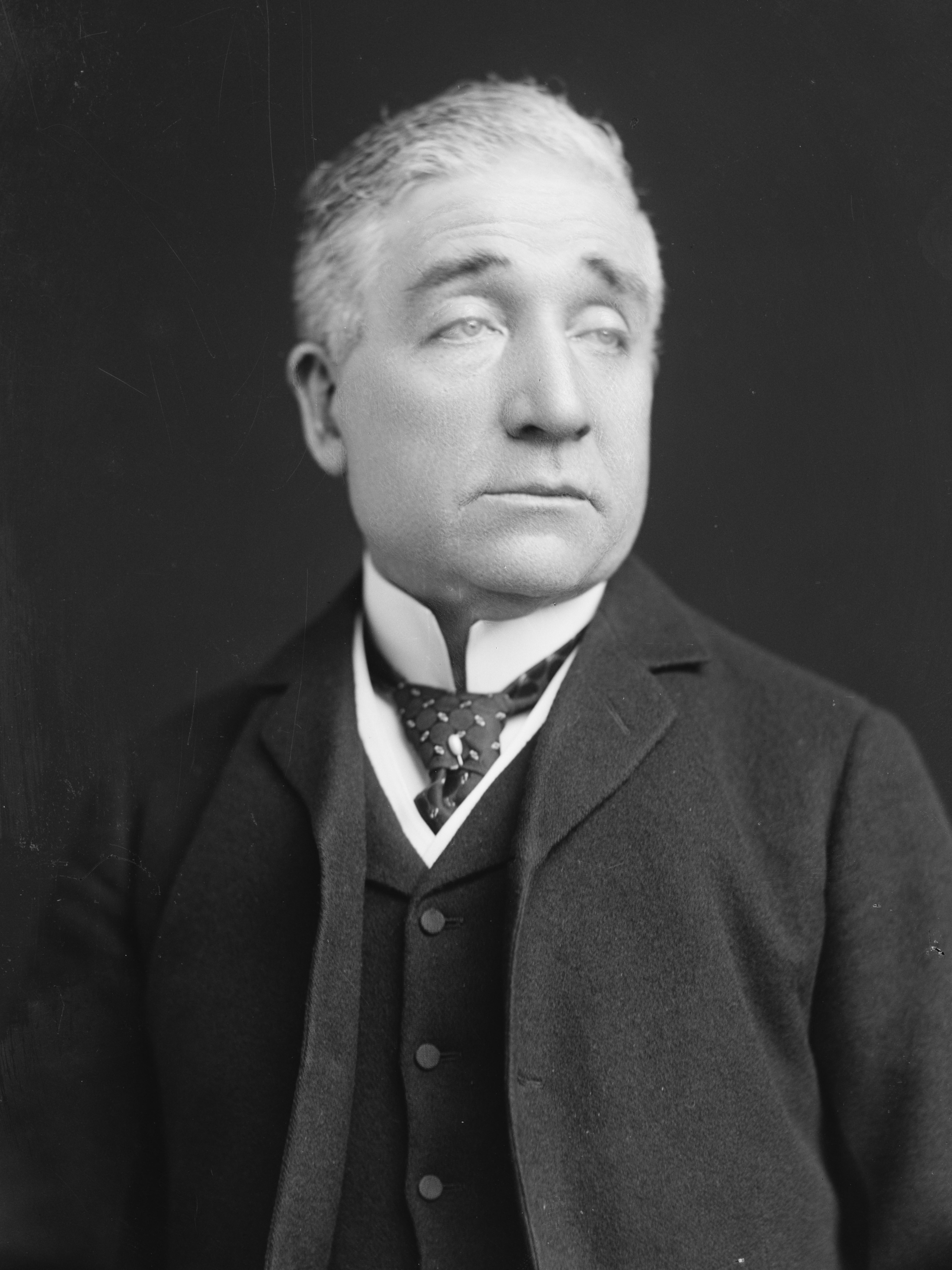
- Cockran c. 1904

Member of the U.S. House of Representatives from New York
- In office March 4, 1921 – March 1, 1923
- Preceded by: Thomas F. Smith
- Succeeded by: John J. O'Connor
- Constituency: 16th district
- In office February 23, 1904 – March 3, 1909
- Preceded by: George B. McClellan Jr.
- Succeeded by: Michael F. Conry
- Constituency: 12th district
- In office November 3, 1891 – March 3, 1895
- Preceded by: Francis B. Spinola
- Succeeded by: George B. McClellan Jr.
- Constituency: 10th district (1891–93); 12th district (1893–95)
- In office March 4, 1887 – March 3, 1889
- Preceded by: Abraham Dowdney
- Succeeded by: Roswell P. Flower
- Constituency: 12th district

Personal details
- Born: William Bourke Cockran; February 28, 1854 County Sligo, Ireland
- Died: March 1, 1923 (aged 69) Washington, D.C., U.S.
- Resting place: Gate of Heaven Cemetery, Hawthorne, New York
- Party: Democratic Party

William Bourke Cockran (February 28, 1854 – March 1, 1923), commonly known as Bourke Cockran or Burke Cochran in contemporary reports, was an Irish-American attorney, Democratic Party politician and orator who represented the East Side of Manhattan in the United States House of Representatives for seven non-consecutive terms between 1887 and 1923. An outspoken proponent of progressive taxation and government intervention, Cockran frequently critiqued the unchecked nature of capitalist systems.

Although associated with the liberal and progressive reform movements, he became widely known as the leading national spokesman for the Tammany Society, the powerful Democratic Party political machine in New York. As an advocate for the gold standard, he crossed party lines to endorse William McKinley in the presidential election of 1896.

He was a leading orator of the late 19th and early 20th century, compared favorably by historians to his contemporary political rival, William Jennings Bryan, and to Edmund Burke. Through his personal relationship with the Churchill family, he was an important, early influence on British statesman Winston Churchill.

== Early life and education ==
William Bourke Cockran was born at Claragh Cottage in Ballysadare, County Sligo, Ireland on February 28, 1854. His father was Martin Cockran and his mother was Harriet White Bourke. His father was a gentleman farmer, well educated in the classics, and his mother was the daughter of a prominent magistrate from Leinster. Bourke Cockran's father died in July 1859, and the family relocated to Dublin.

Intending to educate him for a life as a priest, Cockran's mother sent him to France, where he was educated near Lille before returning in 1865 to finish his education at Summerhill College. After graduation, he became a leading member of the debating societies of Dublin.

In 1871, he traveled to New York City with the ambition of becoming a lawyer. On his arrival, he remarked to his mother that he was "a good deal bewildered" by the Gilded Age contrasts in New York society between fabulous displays of wealth alongside abject poverty of the tenements and streets. He gained employment as a clerk at the A. T. Stewart & Company department store, though he never appeared for work, and secured a position as a tutor at St. Teresa's Academy, a private day school for girls on Rutgers Street.

== Legal career ==
After briefly returning to Ireland to cover the unveiling of a monument to Daniel O'Connell in Dublin as a correspondent for the New York Herald, he declined a position at the foreign news desk and became principal of a public school in Tuckahoe, Westchester County. Studying law privately during the night in the private library of judge Abraham R. Tupper, he was admitted to the bar on September 15, 1876 and opened a solo practice in Mount Vernon. After surviving a bout of diphtheria and mourning the death of his first wife in childbirth, he relocated to New York City in 1878.

After the election of Grover Cleveland as president and Cockran's increasing political influence and fame, he joined in a partnership with William H. Clark, and took on several high-profile cases and clients, including publisher Joseph Pulitzer, who urged on his political activities. He was frequently retained by the New York Central Railroad and the New York, New Haven and Hartford Railroad to argue cases before the Supreme Court of the United States. Other clients included the Long Island Rail Road and the Brooklyn Union Gas Company. By 1895, he earned roughly $100,000 per year ($3,267,708 in 2024 dollars) in legal fees alone.

Cockran grew to be regarded as a leading authority on public utility law and represented most of New York City and Long Island's leading gas and electric companies. As a large shareholder in and lawyer for Brooklyn Union, he reorganized the company and shaped its policy. Cockran was a strong opponent of municipal ownership, though he criticized Brooklyn Union's president, James Jourdan, for managing the company "in a spirit of indifference to the public interest".

Although the majority of his income was derived from his civil practice, Cockran represented several high-profile criminal defendants, In 1883, Cockran served as junior counsel, with Benjamin F. Tracy, in the unsuccessful defense of conman Ferdinand Ward against charges that he had defrauded former president Ulysses S. Grant. In 1887, Cockran defended Jacob Sharp, a railroad lobbyist accused of bribing the Board of Aldermen to secure a franchise to build and operate a streetcar line on Broadway. Though Sharp was found guilty and sentenced to four years hard labor, Cockran successfully argued for the reversal of his conviction on appeal.

Cockran frequently chose to represent high-profile defendants accused of or convicted of murder, out of his personal opposition to capital punishment. In 1889, he handled the unsuccessful appeal of death row inmate William Kemmler, who became the first man executed by means of electric chair the next year. Cockran unsuccessfully challenged the constitutionality of the novel execution method. In 1912, Cockran represented Charles Becker, a New York City policeman convicted for conspiracy to murder gambler Herman Rosenthal. Beginning in 1916, he led a long legal battle to exonerate socialist activist Tom Mooney, who was convicted of the 1916 Preparedness Day bombing in San Francisco. In 1939, after Cockran's death, Mooney was pardoned by Governor of California Culbert Olson.

== Political career ==
=== Tammany Hall ===
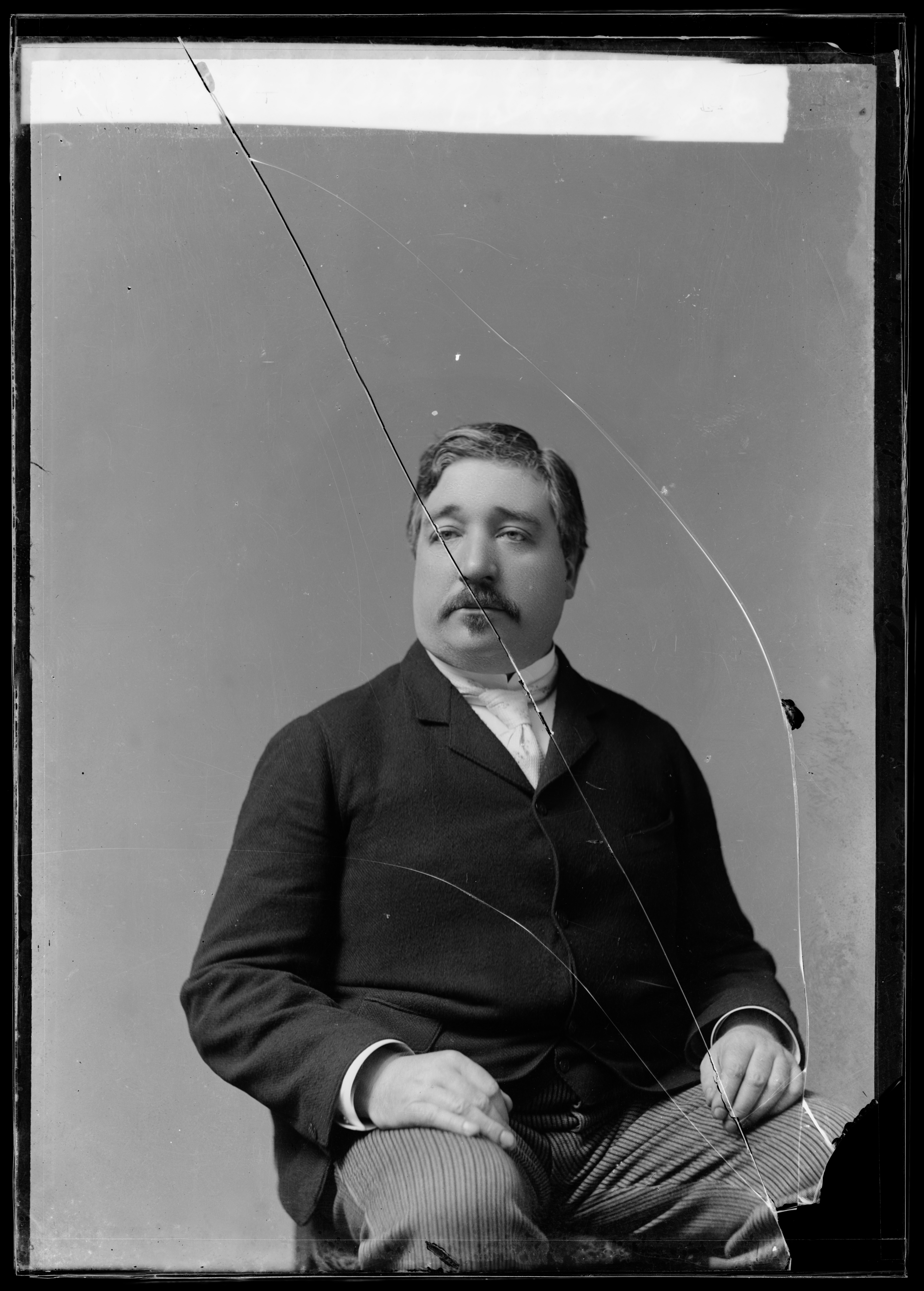
William Bourke Cockran photographed by C. M. Bell Studio

As his reputation as a litigator grew, Cockran entered politics in 1876 as a member of Irving Hall, a political organization composed of reformist followers of Samuel J. Tilden, including influential men such as Abram Hewitt and William C. Whitney. Cockran made his first political speeches in 1879 in support of Edward Cooper, the successful candidate for mayor, who defeated Tammany Hall candidate Augustus Schell. He travelled to Maine in 1880 to speak in support of Harris M. Plaisted, the Greenback Party candidate for governor, who had been cross-endorsed by the Democratic Party of Maine; years later, he would defend himself against accusations that he had begun his career as a "greenbacker". These speeches greatly enhanced his reputation as an orator, and he joined the national campaign in support of Winfield Scott Hancock for president, travelling to the American Midwest for the first time.

In 1882, Cockran endorsed the nomination of Roswell P. Flower for governor at the Democratic state convention. Impressed by his speech in support of Flower, John Kelly recruited him to Tammany Hall. Though he did not immediately accept, he was appointed as counsel to the Sheriff of New York County and became a member of the Tammany Society in fall 1883. For the remainder of his career, he was the leading spokesman for the Tammany position on national issues, though he avoided local and state political debates, and his standing as a member waned over time. Cockran's most famous early national speech was given at the 1884 Democratic National Convention in Chicago, opposing the nomination of Grover Cleveland for president. Cleveland, who had been elected in 1882 with Tammany support, governed New York as a non-partisan reformist and distributed patronage positions with preference for merit over party loyalty, angering Kelly. Cockran also criticized Cleveland for his inexperience and lack of national reputation among voters and argued for the nomination of Allen G. Thurman of Ohio instead. Tammany and Cockran ultimately supported Cleveland in the general election against James G. Blaine.

In 1885, John Kelly became too ill to attend to the daily business of Tammany Hall. Instead, a group of four lieutenants (Cockran, Hugh J. Grant, Thomas F. Gilroy, and Richard Croker) oversaw the organization. When Kelly died in 1886, Croker, who had been closest to Kelly, was elected Grand Sachem of Tammany. For several years, Croker continued to consult Cockran, Grant, and Gilroy before making most decisions, until he assumed absolute authority for himself in December 1893. Cockran and Croker, fellow Irishmen and personal friends, soon became bitter enemies. Croker once referred to Cockran as the most objectionable man he had ever encountered in politics. Cockran continued to support Tammany as the society's leading campaign orator for the remainder of his life, but his standing within the organization's leadership was shaky, and Croker blocked his election to the United States Senate in 1893 in favor of Edward Murphy Jr.

=== US House of Representatives ===
Beginning in 1886, Cockran was a frequent candidate for US Representative, serving all or part of eight terms across 36 years.

He was elected in 1886, but did not seek re-election in 1888.

In 1890, he won a special election to replace Francis B. Spinola, who had died, and at the same time was also elected to a full term. He was re-elected in 1892 and 1894. In 1896, he did not seek re-election, having declared as a "Gold Democrat" opposed to Democrat presidential nominee William Jennings Bryant.

In 1904, Cockran won a special election to replace George B. McClellan Jr., who had resigned to become Mayor of New York City. He was re-elected a full term later that year, and also in 1906, but declined renomination in 1908.

He was a losing candidate in 1912.

He was elected again in 1920, and re-elected in 1922, but died before his new term began in 1923.

=== Other political offices ===
Cockran was a member of the commission to revise the judiciary article of the New York Constitution in 1890.

He was a delegate to the Democratic National Convention in 1884, 1892, 1904, and 1920.

=== 1896 presidential election ===
In 1896, Cockran publicly broke with the Democratic Party, opposing the Free Silver platform of presidential candidate William Jennings Bryan. Cockran campaigned instead for Republican William McKinley, helping to bring Gold Democrats over to McKinley's winning coalition.

In 1900, Cockran returned to the Democratic Party, supporting Bryan's second presidential campaign.

In 1920, Cockran delivered the nominating speech for Al Smith at the Democratic National Convention. Later that year, he was elected to his final term in the House of Representatives.

== Personal life and death ==
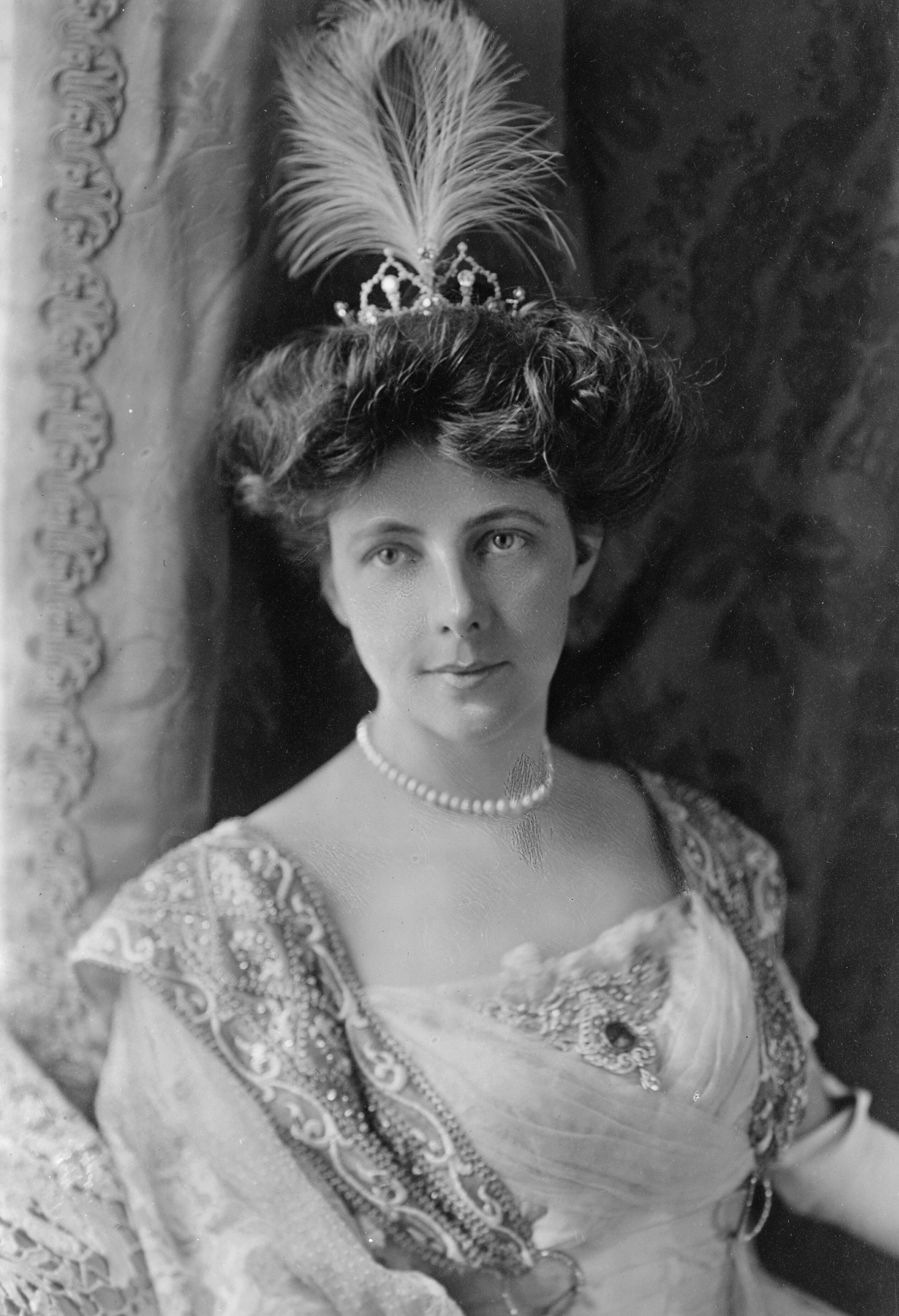
Ann Ide Cockran c. 1908

Cockran married three times. His first wife, Mary Jackson, was his pupil at St. Teresa's Academy. They fell in love in 1876, after he had left the academy, when Jackson nursed him back to health after a bout of diphtheria. They were married after a brief courtship, but Mary died in childbirth within a year.

On June 27, 1885, Cockran married Rhoda Mack, the daughter of a prominent New York City merchant and financier. They purchased an estate at Sands Point, Long Island, where they entertained extensively. Rhoda died ten years after their marriage, following a brief illness. His last marriage was to Anne Ide, daughter of Judge Henry Clay Ide, in 1906.

Cockran was a devout Roman Catholic and became deeply involved in support of Irish nationalism.

Alice Roosevelt Longworth recalled Cockran as "an Anglophobe in public and an Anglomaniac in private."

In 1901, he was awarded the Laetare Medal by the University of Notre Dame, the oldest and most prestigious award for American Catholics.

=== The Churchills ===
Cockran was a friend of Britain's Churchill family, specifically of Lady Randolph Churchill.

In 1895, he introduced Jennie's 20-year-old son, Winston Churchill, to American high society during Churchill's first trip to New York. Years later, Churchill credited Cockran as his first political mentor and the chief role model for his own success as an orator.

Churchill wrote in the 1930s that Cockran was, "A pacifist, individualist, democrat, capitalist, and a 'Gold-bug'....He was equally opposed to socialists, inflationists, and Protectionists, and he resisted them on all occasions." Churchill never became a pacifist but he did adopt all the rest of Cockran's stances during his own political career, and carefully read and reread his speeches for oratorical advice. Churchill quoted Cockran in his 1946 "Iron Curtain speech" recalling: "words which I learned 50 years ago from a great Irish-American orator, a friend of mine, Mr Bourke Cockran: 'There is enough for all. The earth is a generous mother. She will provide, in plentiful abundance, food for all her children, if they will but cultivate her soil in justice and in peace.'"

=== Death and burial ===
He died in Washington, DC on March 1, 1923, two days before the start of his next term as US Representative. He is buried in Gate of Heaven Cemetery, Hawthorne, New York.

== See also ==
- List of members of the United States Congress who died in office (1900–1949)

U.S. House of Representatives
Preceded by Abraham Dowdney	Member of the U.S. House of Representatives from New York's 12th congressional district 1887–1889	Succeeded by Roswell P. Flower
Preceded by Francis Spinola	Member of the U.S. House of Representatives from New York's 10th congressional district 1891–1893	Succeeded by Daniel Sickles
Preceded by Joseph J. Little	Member of the U.S. House of Representatives from New York's 12th congressional district 1893–1895	Succeeded by George B. McClellan Jr.
Preceded by George B. McClellan Jr.	Member of the U.S. House of Representatives from New York's 12th congressional district 1904–1909	Succeeded by Michael Conry
Preceded by Thomas F. Smith	Member of the U.S. House of Representatives from New York's 16th congressional district 1921–1923	Succeeded by John J. O'Connor
