= Thomas F. Burchill =

American politician

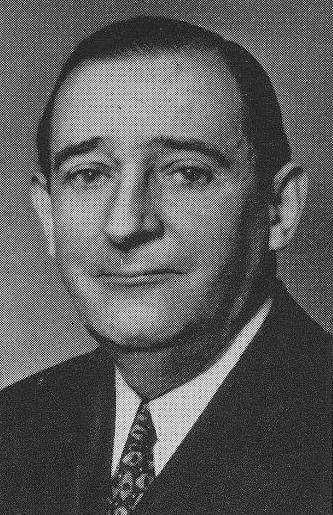

Member of the U.S. House of Representatives from New York's 15th district
- In office January 3, 1943 – January 3, 1945
- Preceded by: Michael J. Kennedy
- Succeeded by: Emanuel Celler

New York State Senate
- In office 1925–1938

New York State Assembly
- In office 1920–1924

Personal details
- Born: August 3, 1882 New York City, US
- Died: March 26, 1955 (aged 72) Far Rockaway, Queens, New York, US
- Party: Democratic
- Education: Niagara University
- Occupation: auctioneer, appraiser

Thomas Francis Burchill (August 3, 1882 – March 26, 1955) was an American businessman and politician who served one term as a United States representative from New York from 1943 to 1945.

== Biography ==
Born in New York City, he attended the city's St. Francis Xavier High School, and graduated from Niagara University. He was an auctioneer, appraiser, and was also interested in the insurance business in New York City after 1900.

=== Political career ===
He was a member of the New York State Assembly (New York Co., 3rd D.) in 1920, 1921, 1922, 1923 and 1924.

He was a member of the New York State Senate (13th D.) from 1925 to 1938, sitting in the 148th, 149th, 150th, 151st, 152nd, 153rd, 154th, 155th, 156th, 157th, 158th, 159th, 160th and 161st New York State Legislatures. He was appointed a member of the New York World's Fair Commission in 1938.

=== Congress ===
Burchill was elected as a Democrat to the 78th United States Congress, holding office from January 3, 1943, to January 3, 1945. He resumed his former business pursuits in New York City and was a consultant and alien property custodian.

=== Death ===
He died on March 26, 1955, in Far Rockaway, Queens. Interment was in Gate of Heaven Cemetery. His widow, Margaret McMahon, died in 1968.

New York State Senate
Preceded by Ellwood M. Rabenold	New York State Senate; 13th District; 1925–1938	Succeeded by Phelps Phelps
U.S. House of Representatives
Preceded by Michael J. Kennedy	Member of the U.S. House of Representatives from New York's 15th congressional district 1943–1945	Succeeded by Emanuel Celler
