= Hall des Lumieres =

Museum in Manhattan, New York

Coordinates: 40.7139°N 74.0052°W

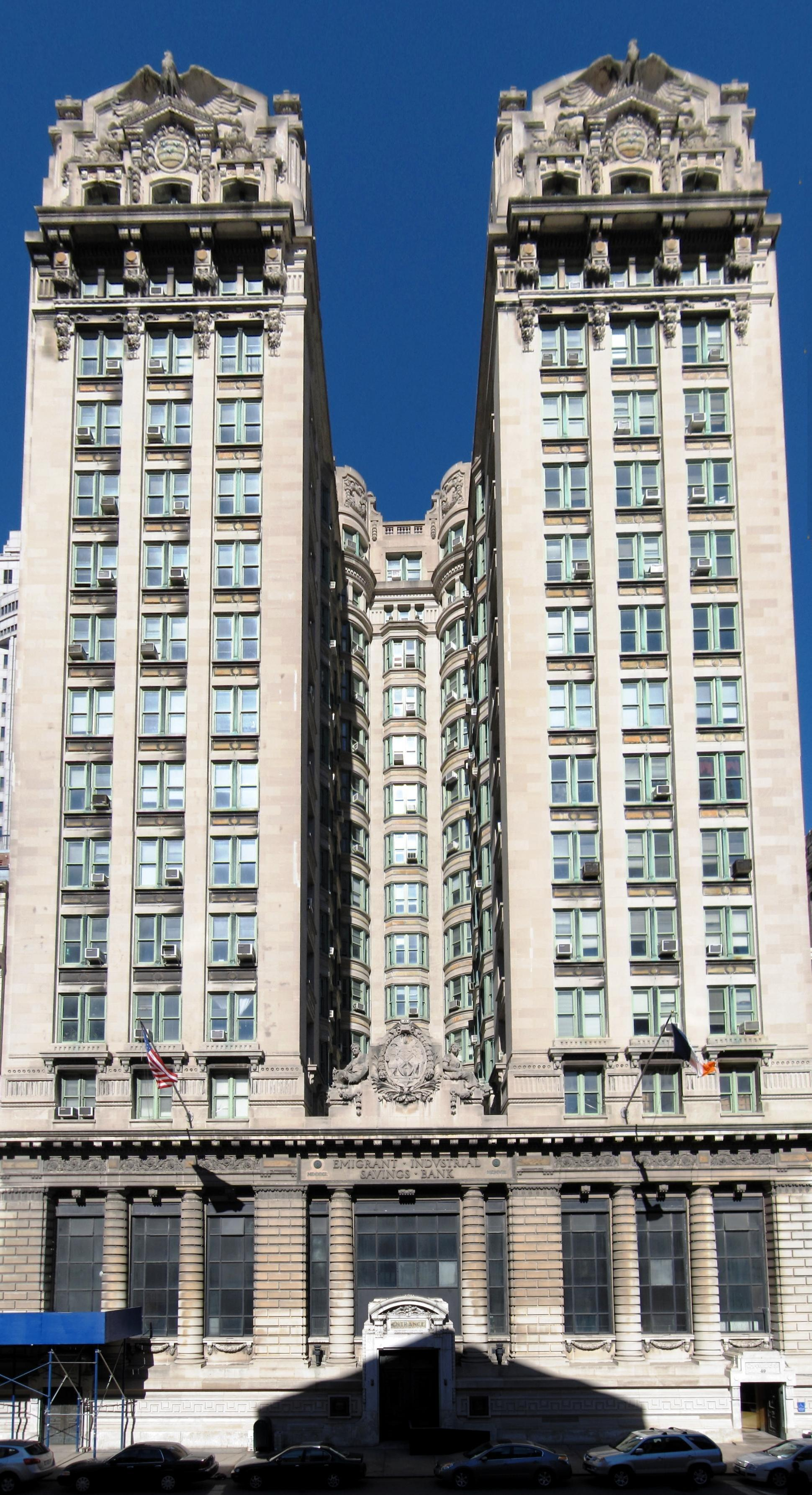
The Emigrant Savings Bank Building where Hall des Lumières is located

Hall des Lumieres or Hall des Lumières is a luxury immersive event space located in the former Emigrant Savings Bank Building at 49 Chambers Street in the Civic Center neighborhood of Lower Manhattan in New York City. The space was opened as a museum after an extensive restoration. The 30,000 square foot space is known for hosting fashion shows, weddings, brand activations, summits, and social events across two levels.

It opened in September 2022 with a show on Gustav Klimt, whose works date to the same era as the building in which it is housed. Subsequent exhibits included Chagall, Paris – New York, Kandinsky, The Odyssey of Abstraction, and Destination Cosmos: The Immersive Space Experience in partnership with NASA.
