= Thomas Francis Smith =

American politician

Thomas F. Smith
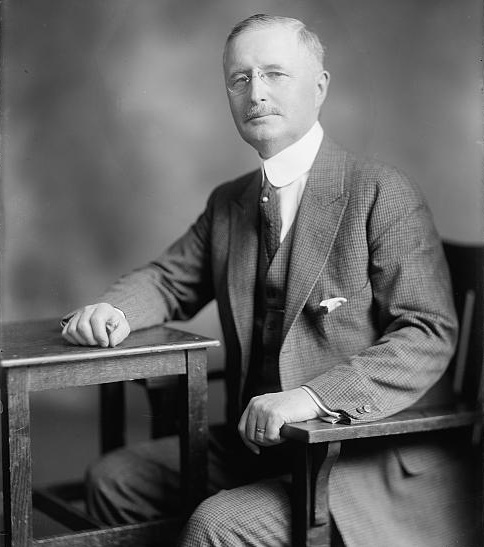
- Congressional portrait, c. 1919

Member of the U.S. House of Representatives from New York
- In office April 12, 1917 – March 3, 1921
- Preceded by: Michael F. Conry
- Succeeded by: William Bourke Cockran
- Constituency: 15th district (1917–1919); 16th district (1919–1921)

Personal details
- Born: Thomas Francis Smith; July 24, 1865 New York City, U.S.
- Died: April 11, 1923 (aged 57) New York City, U.S.
- Resting place: Calvary Cemetery, in Long Island City, New York
- Party: Democratic Party
- Education: Manhattan College; New York Law School
- Occupation: Attorney reporter

Thomas Francis Smith (July 24, 1865 – April 11, 1923) was a lawyer, newspaperman, and politician from New York. From 1917 to 1921, he served two terms in the U.S. House of Representatives.

== Biography ==
Smith was born in New York City on July 24, 1865. He attended St. Francis Xavier College, Manhattan College, and the New York Law School from 1899 to 1901. He subsequently became a reporter on the staff of the New York World and the New York Tribune, and then a clerk of the city court from 1898 to 1917. Smith was admitted to the bar in 1911 and commenced practice in New York City.

=== Political career ===
Smith began his political career as a delegate to the State constitutional convention in 1915 and to the Democratic National Convention in 1916. He was elected as a Democrat to the Sixty-fifth United States Congress to fill the vacancy caused by the death of Michael F. Conry, and was reelected to the Sixty-sixth, to serve from April 12, 1917, to March 3, 1921. Smith was not a candidate for renomination in 1920.

=== Later career and death ===
After Congress, Smith became the public administrator of New York from April 1, 1921, until his death in a taxicab accident in New York City on April 11, 1923. Smith was interred in Calvary Cemetery, in Long Island City, New York.

== Sources ==
- United States Congress. "SMITH, Thomas Francis (id: S000619)". Biographical Directory of the United States Congress.

U.S. House of Representatives
Preceded by Michael F. Conry	Member of the U.S. House of Representatives from New York's 15th congressional district April 12, 1917 – March 3, 1919	Succeeded by Peter J. Dooling
Preceded by Peter J. Dooling	Member of the U.S. House of Representatives from New York's 16th congressional district March 4, 1919 – March 3, 1921	Succeeded by William Bourke Cockran
