= Michael J. Kennedy (politician) =

American politician (1897–1949)

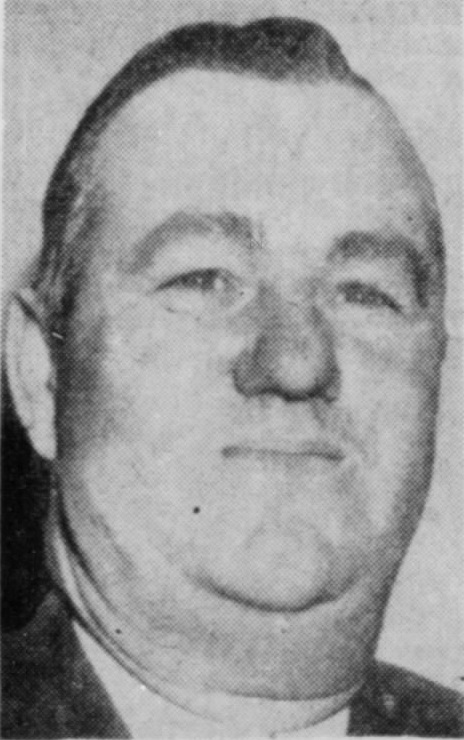

Member of the U.S. House of Representatives from New York's 15th district
- In office January 3, 1939 – January 3, 1943
- Preceded by: John H. Boylan
- Succeeded by: Thomas F. Burchill

Personal details
- Born: Michael Joseph Kennedy; October 25, 1887 New York City, US
- Died: November 1, 1949 (aged 52) Washington, D.C., US
- Resting place: Gate of Heaven Cemetery
- Party: Democratic
- Spouse: Sally Fischer
- Education: Niagara University
- Occupation: auctioneer, appraiser

Michael Joseph Kennedy (October 25, 1897 – November 1, 1949) was an American businessman and politician. He was a member of the United States House of Representatives from the state of New York from 1939 to 1943.

== Biography ==
Kennedy was born in New York City on October 25, 1897, and attended Sacred Heart Parochial School before becoming a clerk for the New York City Board of Elections in 1921.

He was appointed a New York City Marshal in 1923 and served until 1938, when he became active in the insurance business.

=== Congress ===
Kennedy was elected to the U.S. House of Representatives in 1938 as a Democrat and reelected in 1940. He served from January 1939 to January 1943 (the 76th and 77th Congresses). He was not a candidate for reelection in 1942.

=== Later career ===
After leaving Congress, he returned to the insurance business. Kennedy had been active in the Tammany Hall organization, and was the organization's leader from 1942 to 1944.

=== Death ===
On November 1, 1949, Kennedy was killed in the crash of Eastern Airlines Flight 537 in Washington, D.C. His remains were interred at the Gate of Heaven Cemetery in Hawthorne, New York.

== Family ==
In 1928, Kennedy married Sally Fischer, who had been his secretary in the city marshal's office.

== External sources ==
- United States Congress. "Michael J. Kennedy (id: K000112)". Biographical Directory of the United States Congress.

U.S. House of Representatives
Preceded by John J. Boylan	Member of the U.S. House of Representatives from New York's 15th congressional district 1939–1943	Succeeded by Thomas F. Burchill
