= John J. O'Connor (congressman) =

American politician

John Joseph O'Connor
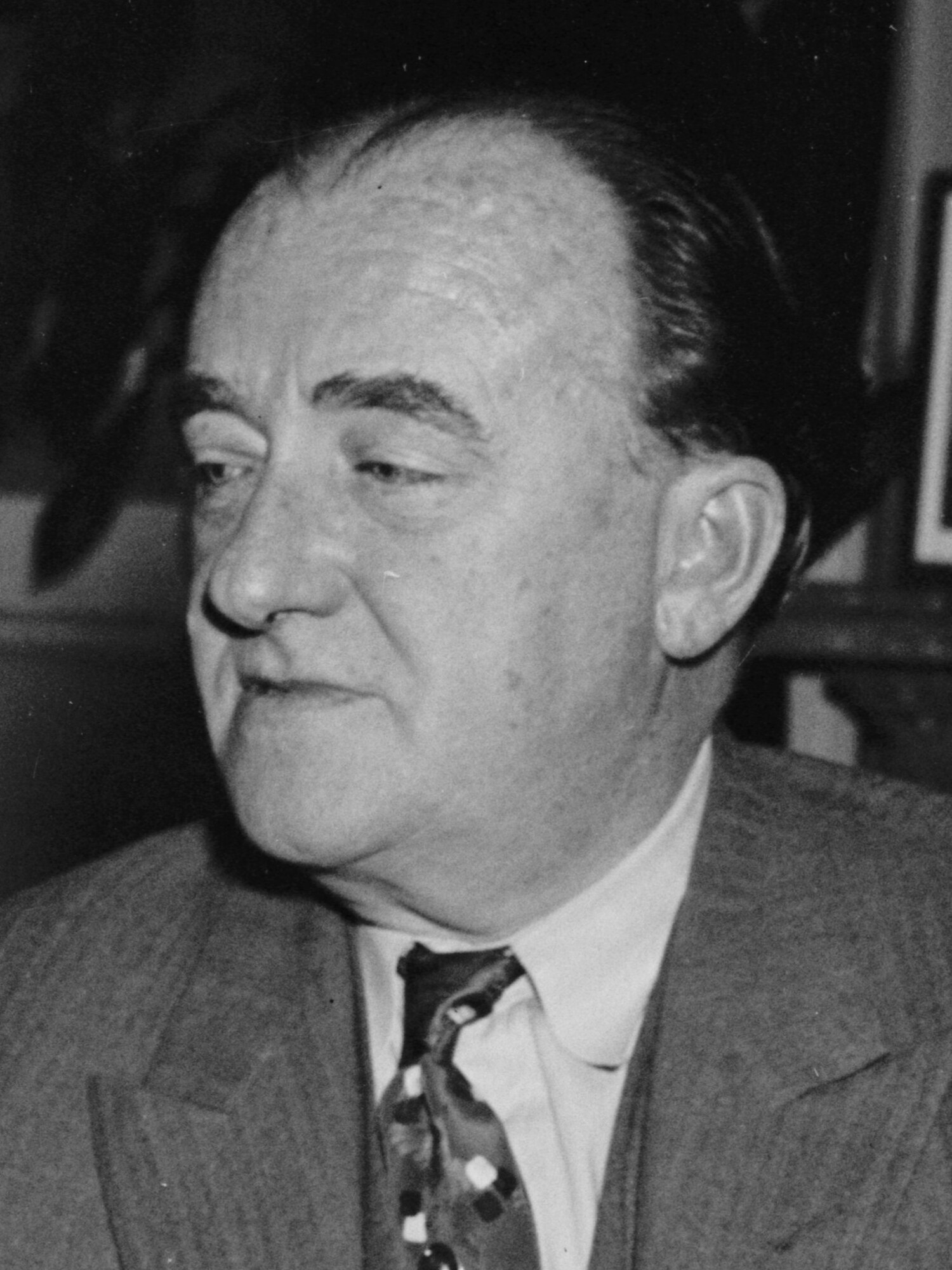
- O'Connor in 1938

Chair of the House Rules Committee
- In office January 3, 1935 – January 3, 1939
- Speaker: Joseph W. Byrns Sr. William B. Bankhead
- Preceded by: William B. Bankhead
- Succeeded by: Adolph J. Sabath

Member of the U.S. House of Representatives from New York's 16th district
- In office November 6, 1923 – January 3, 1939
- Preceded by: William Bourke Cockran
- Succeeded by: James H. Fay

Member of the New York State Assembly from the New York County, 12th district
- In office January 1, 1921 – November 6, 1923
- Preceded by: Martin G. McCue
- Succeeded by: Paul T. Kammerer Jr.

Personal details
- Born: November 23, 1885 Raynham, Massachusetts, U.S.
- Died: January 26, 1960 (aged 74) Washington, D.C., U.S.
- Party: Democratic (until 1938); Republican (1938–1960)
- Children: Daniel O'connor
- Education: Brown University; Harvard University School of Law

John Joseph O'Connor (November 23, 1885 – January 26, 1960) was an American lawyer and politician from New York City. From 1923 to 1939, he served eight terms in the U.S. House of Representatives.

A leader of the conservative Democrats, he chaired the powerful House Rules Committee. President Franklin Roosevelt made him a major target of his purge of Democrats who opposed the New Deal, and he was defeated in 1938.

== Early life and education ==
O'Connor was born in Raynham, Massachusetts. He graduated from Brown University in 1908 and Harvard University School of Law in 1911.

== Political career ==
He was a member of the New York State Assembly (New York Co., 12th D.) in 1921, 1922 and 1923.

=== Tenure in Congress ===
He was elected as a Democrat to the 68th United States Congress to fill the vacancy caused by the death of W. Bourke Cockran, and was re-elected to the seven succeeding Congresses, holding office from November 6, 1923, to January 3, 1939. He was a delegate at large to the 1936 Democratic National Convention. O'Connor was one of the few Democrats targeted in the 1938 primaries by Franklin D. Roosevelt to be defeated. He eventually switched parties and was the Republican nominee but lost re-election.

==== Rules chairman ====
He was chairman of the House Rules Committee between 1935 and 1938. O'Connor was a spokesman for big business and helped defeat Roosevelt's executive reorganization bill. He tried and failed to keep the Fair Labor Standards Act bottled up in committee. Ridiculing the New Deal Coalition, he mocked the poor people who “go to the public trough to be fed.”

== Death and burial ==
He died in Washington, and was interred at Gate of Heaven Cemetery in Silver Spring, Maryland.

== Bibliography ==
- Dodge, Andrew R. (2005). Biographical Directory of the United States Congress: 1774-2005. Washington, D.C.: U.S. Government Printing Office. ISBN 9780160731761.
- Polenberg, Richard. “Franklin Roosevelt and the Purge of John O’Connor: The Impact of Urban Change on Political Parties.” New York History 49#3 (1968), pp. 306–26, online

New York State Assembly
Preceded by Martin G. McCue	New York State Assembly; New York County, 12th District; 1921–1923	Succeeded by Paul T. Kammerer Jr.
U.S. House of Representatives
Preceded by W. Bourke Cockran	Member of the U.S. House of Representatives from New York's 16th congressional district 1923–1939	Succeeded by James H. Fay
