= Michael F. Conry =

American politician

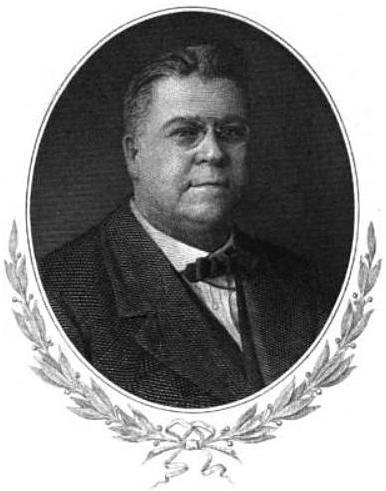
- Conry, 1917

Member of the U.S. House of Representatives from New York
- In office March 4, 1909 – March 2, 1917
- Preceded by: William Bourke Cockran
- Succeeded by: Thomas Francis Smith
- Constituency: 12th district (1909—13); 15th district (1913–17)

Personal details
- Born: April 2, 1870 Shenandoah, Pennsylvania, U.S.
- Died: March 2, 1917 (aged 46) Washington, D.C., U.S.
- Party: Democratic
- Spouse: Katherine O'Boyle
- Education: University of Michigan Law School

Michael Francis Conry (April 2, 1870 – March 2, 1917) was an American newspaperman, lawyer, and politician who served four terms as a U.S. representative from New York from 1909 to 1917.

== Biography ==
Born in Shenandoah, Pennsylvania, Conry attended the public schools, and was employed in the coal mines until sustaining an injury which crushed his ankles and left him crippled. He taught school for seven years, and also worked as an accountant and a newspaper reporter.

After deciding on a career as an attorney, he graduated from the University of Michigan Law School in 1896, was admitted to the bar and commenced practice in Scranton, Pennsylvania. He was an unsuccessful candidate for election in 1900 to the Fifty-seventh Congress.

He later moved to New York City and resumed the practice of law, including two years as the city's assistant corporation counsel.

=== Congress ===
Conry was elected as a Democrat to the Sixty-first Congress. He was reelected to the three succeeding Congresses and served from March 4, 1909, until his death.

=== Death ===
Conry suffered from Bright's disease, a classification of kidney disease that would be described in modern medicine as acute or chronic nephritis, and became ill in late 1916. He died in Washington, D.C., on March 2, 1917, and was interred at Calvary Cemetery in Maspeth, Queens.

=== Family ===
He was married to Katherine O'Boyle of Scranton, and they were the parents of three daughters.

== See also ==
- List of members of the United States Congress who died in office (1900–1949)

U.S. House of Representatives
Preceded by Thomas G. Patten	Member of the U.S. House of Representatives from New York's 15th congressional district 1913-1917	Succeeded by Thomas F. Smith
Preceded by William Bourke Cockran	Member of the U.S. House of Representatives from New York's 12th congressional district 1909-1913	Succeeded by Henry M. Goldfogle
