= Peter J. Dooling =

American politician

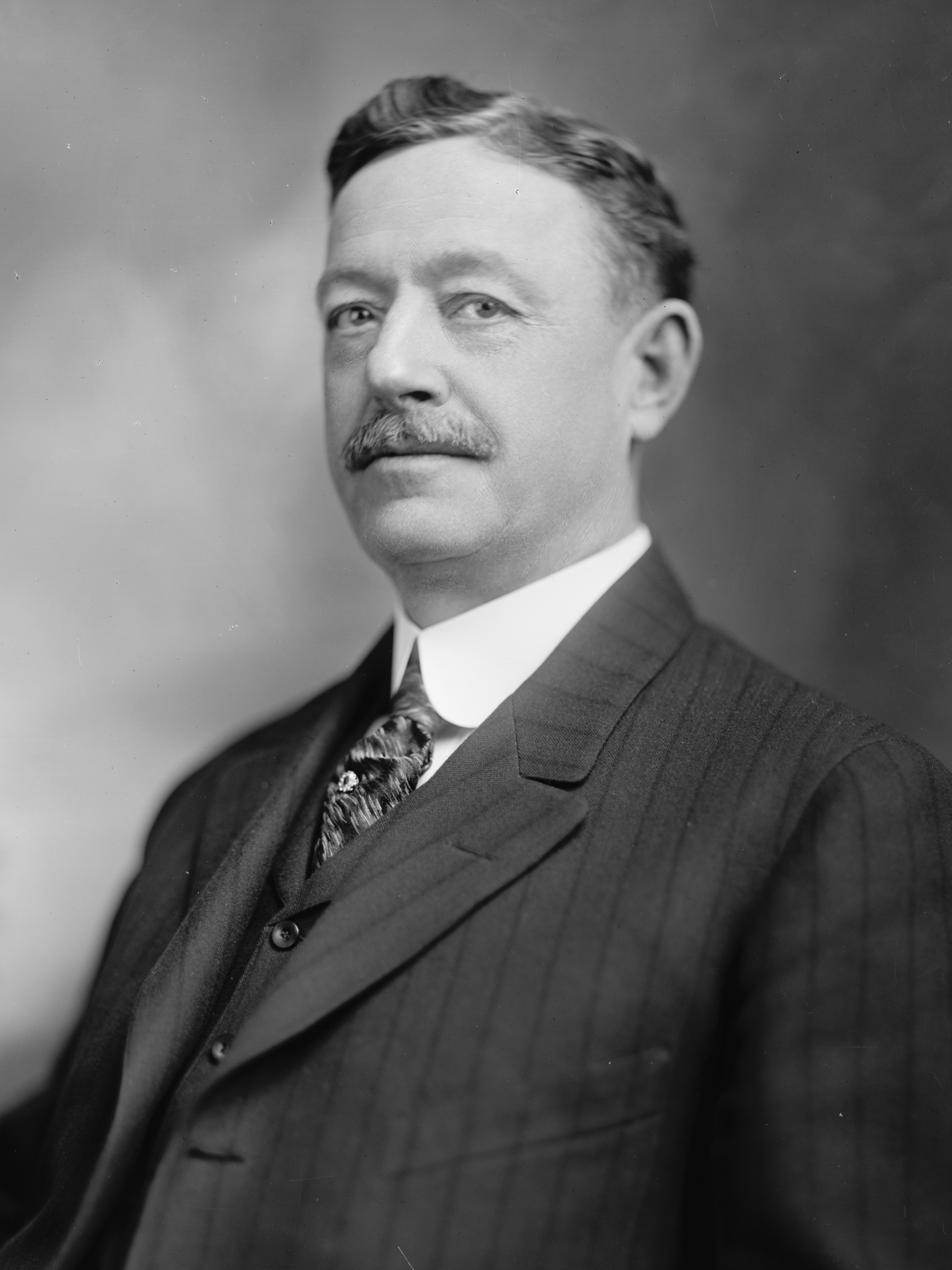

Sheriff of New York County
- In office 1924

Member of the U.S. House of Representatives from New York
- In office March 4, 1913 – March 3, 1921
- Preceded by: Francis B. Harrison
- Succeeded by: Thomas J. Ryan
- Constituency: 16th district (1913–19); 15th district (1919–21)

Member of the New York Senate from the 16th District district
- In office 1903–1905

Personal details
- Born: February 15, 1857 New York City, New York, U.S.
- Died: October 18, 1931 (aged 74) New York City, New York, U.S.
- Resting place: Calvary Cemetery
- Party: Democratic

Peter Joseph Dooling (February 15, 1857 – October 18, 1931) was an American businessman and politician who served four terms as a U.S. representative from New York from 1913 to 1921.

== Biography ==
Born in New York City, Dooling attended the public schools. He engaged in the real-estate business.

He served as court officer in the court of general sessions in 1887–1889. He served as member of the board of aldermen of New York City in 1891 and 1892. Deputy clerk of the court of special sessions in 1893–1895. He served as member of the aqueduct commission in 1898. Deputy commissioner of the department of water supply, gas, and electricity in 1898–1901.

=== State legislature ===
He was a member of the New York State Senate (16th D.) from 1903 to 1905, sitting in the 126th, 127th and 128th New York State Legislatures. He was Clerk of New York County from 1906 to 1908.

=== Congress ===
Dooling was elected as a Democrat to the sixty-third and to the three succeeding congresses (March 4, 1913 – March 3, 1921), and served as chairman of the committee on expenditures in the Department of War (sixty-fifth congress). He was an unsuccessful candidate for reelection in 1920 to the Sixty-seventh Congress. Sheriff of New York County, New York in 1924.

=== Later career and death ===
He served as commissioner of the department of purchases of New York City in 1926. Reengaged in the real-estate business.

He died in New York City October 18, 1931. He was interred in Calvary Cemetery.

New York State Senate
Preceded by Patrick F. Trainor	New York State Senate; 16th District; 1903–1905	Succeeded by John M. Quinn
U.S. House of Representatives
Preceded by Francis B. Harrison	Member of the U.S. House of Representatives from New York's 16th congressional district 1913–1919	Succeeded by Thomas Francis Smith
Preceded by Thomas Francis Smith	Member of the U.S. House of Representatives from New York's 15th congressional district 1919–1921	Succeeded by Thomas Jefferson Ryan
