= Thomas Jefferson Ryan =

American politician

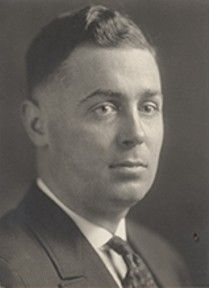

Member of the U.S. House of Representatives from New York's 15th district
- In office March 4, 1921 – March 3, 1923
- Preceded by: Peter J. Dooling
- Succeeded by: John J. Boylan

Personal details
- Born: June 17, 1888 New York City, U.S.
- Died: October 10, 1968 (aged 90) Miami, Florida, U.S.
- Resting place: Calvary Cemetery, Long Island City, New York
- Party: Republican (before 1926); Democratic (after 1926)
- Education: Fordham University

Thomas Jefferson Ryan (June 17, 1888 – November 10, 1968) was a U.S. representative from New York.

Born in New York City, the son of John L. Ryan and Mary Belle (Tracy) Ryan, Ryan attended the public schools and the College of the City of New York. He graduated from Fordham University in 1908 and from Fordham University School of Law in 1911. He was admitted to the bar in 1912 and commenced practice in New York City.

In 1917 he joined the United States Army for World War I, and received a commission as a Second Lieutenant after completing officer training in Plattsburgh. He completed aviator training at Kelly Field and Roosevelt Field, and served in France. He was wounded in France, and was discharged in March 1919. He received the French Croix de Guerre with Palm.

Ryan was elected as a Republican to the Sixty-seventh Congress (March 4, 1921 – March 3, 1923). He was referred to in the newspapers as "baby member of the House" due to his relative youth and youthful appearance. He was an unsuccessful candidate for reelection in 1922 to the Sixty-eighth Congress. He served as delegate to the State Republican convention in 1922.

He married in 1923 to Mrs Gertrude Keleher, who was divorced from Washington turfman John B. Keleher in 1920.

He resumed the practice of law. He served as delegate to the Republican National Convention in 1924. He served as special deputy attorney general of New York in 1925. He served as counsel to the Alien Property Custodian 1925–1930.

He was affiliated with the Democratic Party in 1926.

He retired in 1950 to Coral Gables, Florida. He died in Miami, Florida, November 10, 1968. He was interred in Calvary Cemetery, Long Island City, New York.

== Sources ==
- United States Congress. "Thomas Jefferson Ryan (id: R000560)". Biographical Directory of the United States Congress.

U.S. House of Representatives
Preceded by Peter J. Dooling	Member of the U.S. House of Representatives from New York's 15th congressional district 1921–1923	Succeeded by John J. Boylan
