= John J. Boylan =

American politician

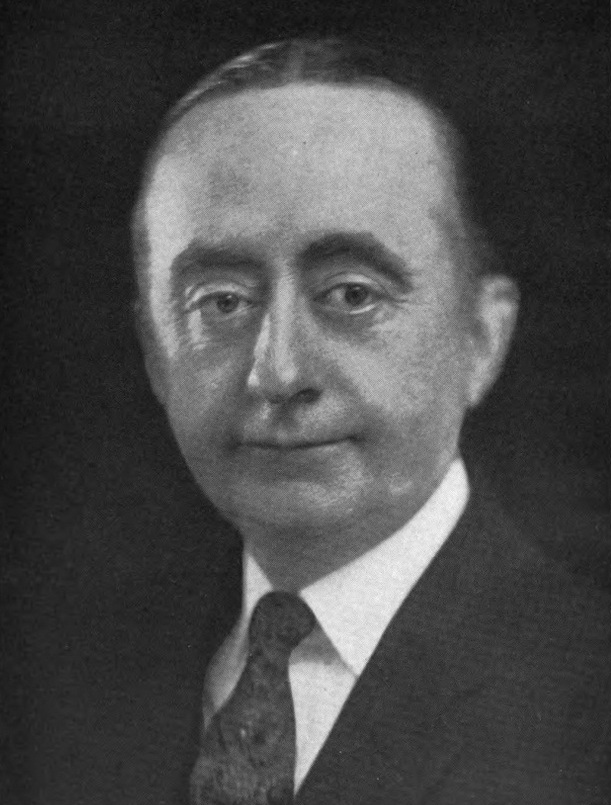

Member of the U.S. House of Representatives from New York's 15th district
- In office March 4, 1923 – October 5, 1938
- Preceded by: Thomas J. Ryan
- Succeeded by: Michael J. Kennedy

Member of the New York Senate from the 13th district
- In office January 1, 1919 – December 31, 1922
- Preceded by: Jimmy Walker
- Succeeded by: Ellwood M. Rabenold

Member of the New York Senate from the 15th district
- In office January 1, 1913 – December 31, 1918
- Preceded by: Thomas J. McManus
- Succeeded by: Abraham Kaplan

Member of the New York State Assembly from the New York County, 11th district
- In office January 1, 1910 – December 31, 1912
- Preceded by: Owen W. Bohan
- Succeeded by: John Kerrigan

Personal details
- Born: John Joseph Boylan; September 20, 1878 New York City, U.S.
- Died: October 5, 1938 (aged 60) New York City, U.S.
- Citizenship: United States
- Party: Democratic Party
- Education: Manhattan College
- Profession: Realtor, politician

John Joseph Boylan (September 20, 1878 – October 5, 1938) was an American politician who served eight terms as a Democratic member of the United States House of Representatives from New York from 1923 until his death in 1938.

== Early life and career ==
Boylan was born in New York City the son of Patrick and Elizabeth (McElroy) Boylan. He attended the public schools, Cathedral School, De La Salle Institute, and Manhattan College. Boylan was employed as a postal clerk and afterward engaged in the real estate business.

=== Political career ===
He was a member of the New York State Assembly (New York Co., 11th D.) in 1910, 1911 and 1912.

He was a member of the New York State Senate from 1913 to 1922, sitting in the 136th, 137th, 138th, 139th, 140th, 141st, 142nd, 143rd, 144th and 145th New York State Legislatures.

== Congress ==
He was elected as a Democrat to the 68th, 69th, 70th, 71st, 72nd, 73rd, 74th and 75th United States Congresses, holding office from March 4, 1923 until his death on October 5, 1938, in New York City.

== Death ==
Boylan died on October 5, 1938, in French Hospital in Manhattan; and was buried at the Calvary Cemetery in Queens.

== See also ==
- List of members of the United States Congress who died in office (1900–1949)

New York State Assembly
Preceded by Owen W. Bohan	New York State Assembly; New York County, 11th District; 1910–1912	Succeeded by John Kerrigan
New York State Senate
Preceded by Thomas J. McManus	New York State Senate; 15th District; 1913–1918	Succeeded by Abraham Kaplan
Preceded by Jimmy Walker	New York State Senate; 13th District; 1919–1922	Succeeded by Ellwood M. Rabenold
U.S. House of Representatives
Preceded by Thomas J. Ryan	Member of the U.S. House of Representatives from New York's 15th congressional district 1923–1938	Succeeded by Michael J. Kennedy
