= 49 Chambers =

Residential building in Manhattan, New York

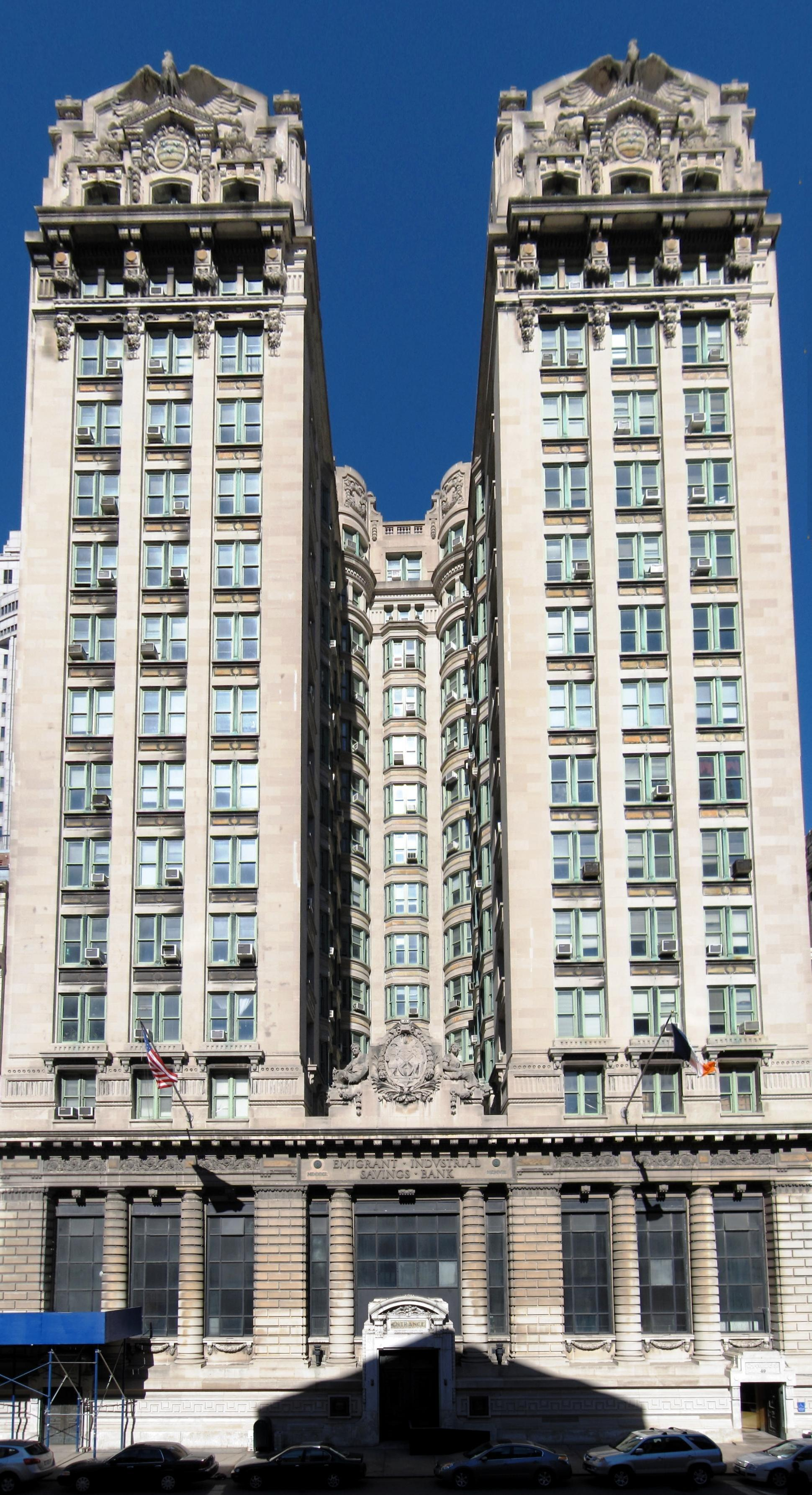
- Former names: 51 Chambers Street
- Alternative names: Emigrant Industrial Savings Bank Building

General information
- Type: Residential
- Architectural style: Beaux-Arts
- Location: 49 Chambers Street, New York City, United States
- Coordinates: 40°42′50″N 74°00′19″W
- Groundbreaking: August 1909
- Opened: 1912
- Owner: The Chetrit Group

Height
- Height: 188.29 feet (57 m)

Technical details
- Structural system: steel frame
- Material: stone, granite, brick, terracotta
- Floor count: 17 (+2 basement)

Design and construction
- Architect: Raymond F. Almirall
- Developer: Emigrant Savings Bank

Renovating team
- Renovating firm: Woods Bagot; Gabellini Sheppard Associates

Other information
- Number of units: 99

Website
- 49chambers.com
- Former Emigrant Industrial Savings Bank
- U.S. National Register of Historic Places
- New York State Register of Historic Places
- New York City Landmark
- Location: 51 Chambers St., Manhattan, New York
- Coordinates: 40°42′50″N 74°00′19″W
- Built: 1909–1912
- Architect: Raymond F. Almirall
- Architectural style: Beaux-Arts
- NRHP reference No.: 82003375
- NYSRHP No.: 06101.001690
- NYCL No.: 1123, 1438

Significant dates
- Added to NRHP: February 25, 1982
- Designated NYSRHP: January 21, 1982
- Designated NYCL: July 9, 1985

49 Chambers, formerly known as the Emigrant Industrial Savings Bank Building and 51 Chambers Street, is a residential building at 49–51 Chambers Street in the Civic Center neighborhood of Manhattan in New York City. It was built between 1909 and 1912 and was designed by Raymond F. Almirall in the Beaux-Arts style. The building occupies a slightly irregular lot bounded by Chambers Street to the south, Elk Street to the east, and Reade Street to the north.

49 Chambers was the largest bank building in the United States upon its completion. It was the first skyscraper to use the "H" layout, which provided light and air to more parts of the building. The basement through second floor fill the entire lot, while the third through fifteenth floors contain the "H" layout and are designed to resemble a pair of towers. The facade is made largely of Indiana Limestone, as well as some brick and granite. Inside, the first and second floors constitute a former banking hall, used as an event space called Hall des Lumieres. The upper floors were used as offices before being converted to 99 residential condominiums.

The current building is the third built by the Emigrant Savings Bank on the same site; the bank had previously erected structures in 1858 and 1885–1887. 49 Chambers' banking hall was occupied by the bank until 1969, while office tenants occupied the upper floors. The building was subsequently owned by the government of New York City until 2013, and it was converted to condominiums in 2017. 49 Chambers was added to the National Register of Historic Places in 1982, and both the exterior and the first floor interior were designated New York City landmarks in 1985.

== Site ==
49 Chambers is in the Civic Center neighborhood of Manhattan, just north of City Hall Park. It has frontage along Chambers Street to the south and Reade Street to the north; in addition, 49 Chambers faces a parking lot and Elk Street to the east, and 280 Broadway to the west. Other nearby buildings and locations include the Broadway–Chambers Building and 287 Broadway to the west; the Ted Weiss Federal Building and African Burial Ground National Monument to the north; the Surrogate's Courthouse to the east; and the Tweed Courthouse and New York City Hall, within City Hall Park, to the south. The site measures 123 feet (37 m) on Chambers Street and 125 feet (38 m) on Reade Street, with a depth of 151 feet (46 m).

The ground slopes downward from north to south; the original ground elevation was below Reade Street and close to sea level. The surrounding area contains evidence of the interment of individuals, mostly of African descent, and some of these corpses may remain under the Emigrant Savings Bank Building site. Within the area, a frame church at 47 Chambers Street was built in 1801 by the Presbyterian Church in the United States of America. The frame church was replaced with a brick church in 1818. The current building is the third erected by the bank on the site of the churches and burial ground.

== Architecture ==
49 Chambers was built from 1909 to 1912 and was designed by Raymond F. Almirall in the Beaux-Arts style. It was built by contractor Charles T. Wills Inc. The 5,300 short tons (4,700 long tons; 4,800 t) of steel was supplied by Post and McCord; the foundations were made by the O'Rourke Engineering and Construction Company; and the brick was supplied by the Harbison Walker Refractories Company.

The building is 188.29 feet (57.39 m) tall with 17 above-ground stories. (Note: Some sources place the number of stories as low as 14, although it is less than the number of publicly visible stories on the facade. Emporis claims a figure of 17 stories.) At the time of completion, it was the largest bank building in the United States. The Emigrant Building's exterior is made mostly of Indiana Limestone, with granite at the lowest stories.

The first three stories fill the whole lot, while the remaining stories utilize an "H" layout, creating "light courts" to increase natural light exposure. (Note: According to some sources, 49 Chambers was identified as the first skyscraper in New York City to use such a layout. However, architectural writers Sarah Landau and Carl Condit state that 49 Chambers was preceded in this respect by the Hudson Terminal buildings, which also featured an "H" layout when completed in 1909.) At the time the Emigrant Savings Bank Building was constructed, skyscraper developers in New York City were generally looking for layouts that could maximize naturally-lit floor space. Before the Emigrant Savings Bank Building's completion, developers frequently bought surrounding low-rise buildings to preserve their structures' views; alternatively, architects would design the upper floors to be smaller than the lower floors to compensate for large rooftop cornices.

=== Facade ===
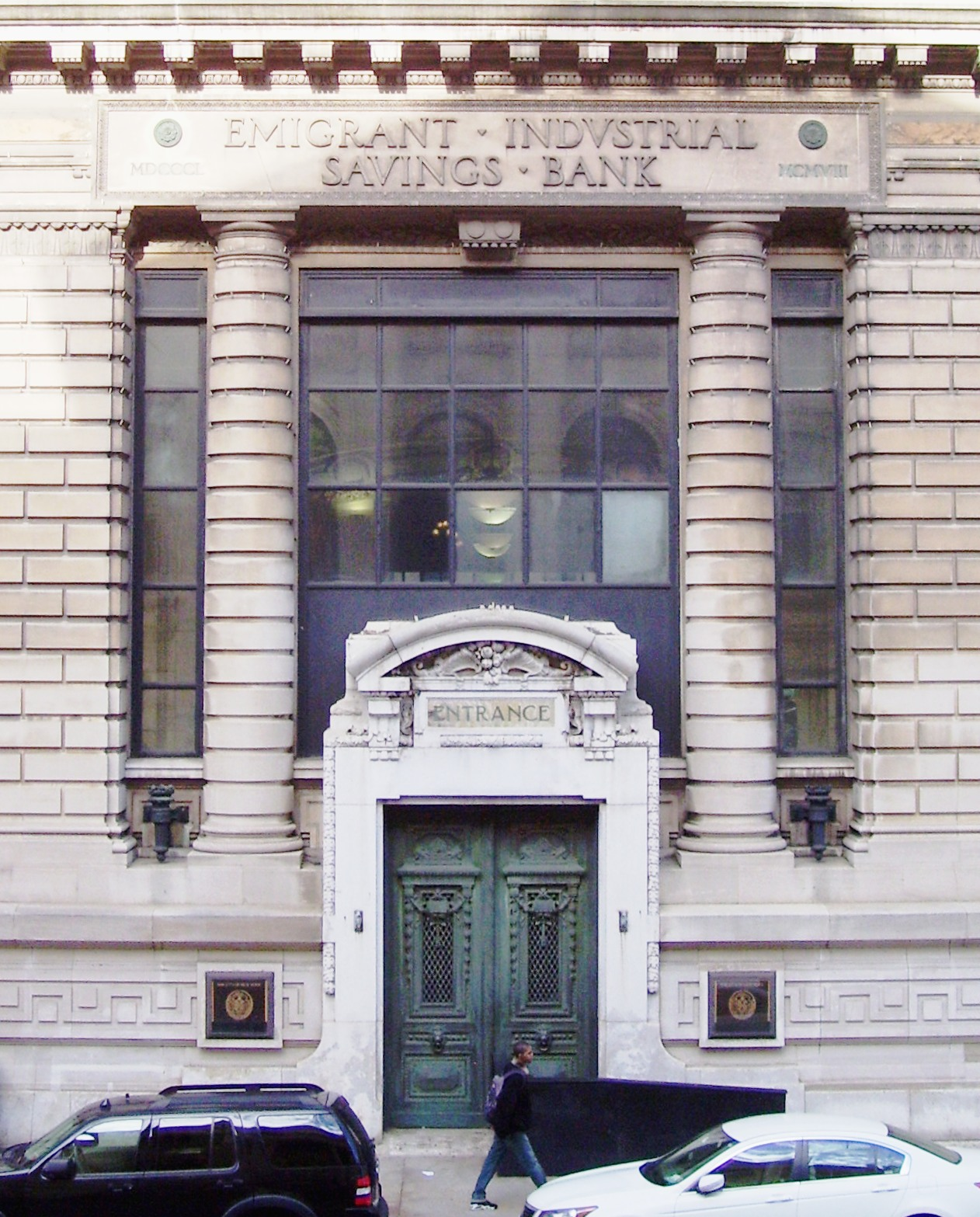
The main entrance to the building

The facade is set atop a raised basement containing a stone course. On the Chambers Street elevation, at the first and second floors, rusticated granite piers and engaged columns subdivide the facade into nine bays. There is a double-height window in each bay; on the six outermost bays, there are swags beneath the windows and a stylized keystone above them. The primary entrance is in the central bay and contains a granite surround underneath an ornate arched pediment with the word entrance. The secondary entrances on both ends contain a simpler granite surround, with the street address above the door. There is an entablature above the second floor, which is interrupted by a plaque of the bank's name in the three center bays. A stepped pediment runs above the second floor, and a large coat of arms sits atop the pediment in the central bay.

There are also three entrances on Reade Street. The center entrance contains a granite surround topped by the word bank, while the smaller entrances on either end are topped by their street addresses. The first and second floors of the Reade Street side are divided by brick pilasters into seven bays, with the central bay being wider than the others. The piers support a plain frieze above the second floor, with the bank's name in the center. A small pediment protrudes above the central bay.

The upper floors contain the H-shaped plan and are designed to resemble a pair of three-bay-wide towers on both the Chambers and Reade Street sides. The windows facing the streets are rectangular, while the windows facing the light courts are progressively rounded and angled toward the interior of the light courts. There are nine bays facing the light court on Chambers Street and seven facing the Reade Street light court. The third floor is treated as a "transitional" story and contains windows connected by geometric designs. The following ten floors, between the fourth and the thirteenth stories, consist of square-headed, copper-framed windows set back slightly between limestone piers. The fourteenth floor, another "transitional" story, sits atop a small cornice, and the windows are flanked by brackets supporting a much larger cornice. The fifteenth floor is designed as an attic with dormers. Heavy pediments atop the ends of both towers contain bee motifs evocative of the Barberini mercantile family, as well as large stone carvings of eagles and urns. The western and eastern walls are relatively plain brick walls with few windows. These walls contain painted signs with the bank's name, which date from the 1960s.

=== Interior ===
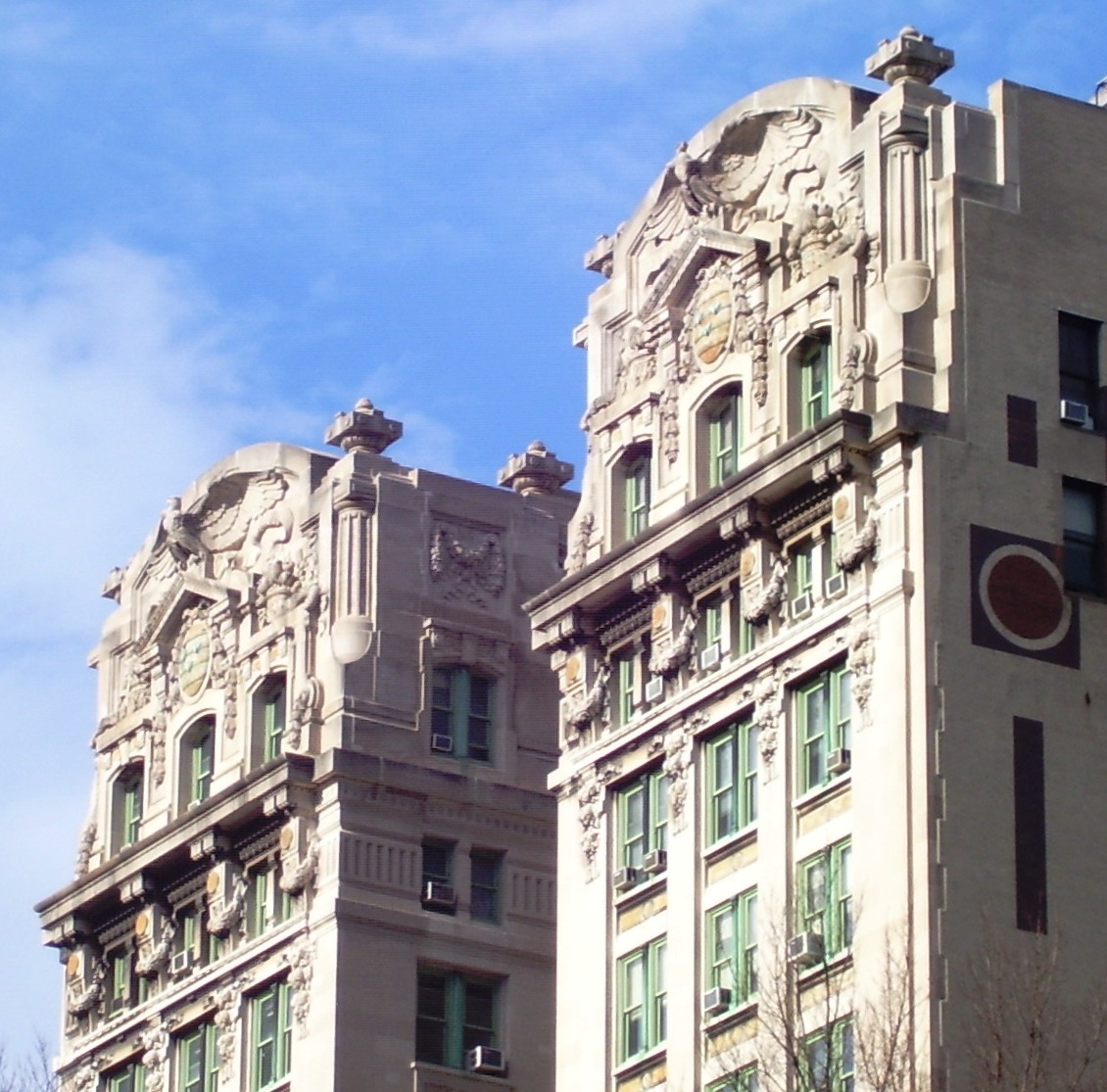
The top of the building's towers, as seen from the Manhattan end of the Brooklyn Bridge

49 Chambers initially had a banking hall on the first and second floors, and was split up into office space above the second floor. Since its 2017 residential conversion, the building has had 99 condominium apartments, ranging from one to three bedrooms. Each unit contains at least 1,000 square feet (93 m^{2}). Entrances to the building's residential condominiums are on Chambers and Reade Streets.

49 Chambers' foundation is carried upon caissons, extending to the layer of gravel 60 to 65 feet (18 to 20 m) below the curb. The cellars extend 36 feet (11 m) deep. The floors carry a load of 150 pounds per square foot (7.2 kPa) at the ground floor and basement, and 75 pounds per square foot (3.6 kPa) on the upper floors. The floors are made of segmental terracotta, while the ceilings are hung below the floor slabs. All columns below the first floor, except for the side wall columns, are filled with concrete. Each interior column is fireproofed with 2 to 3 inches (51 to 76 mm) of concrete held in place by 2 to 4 inches (51 to 102 mm) of brickwork.

The basement contains several resident amenities, such as a residents' lounge, swimming pool, gym, steam room, sauna, and virtual golf simulator. As built, 49 Chambers had three vaults, but two were removed during the building's residential conversion. There is also a residents' rooftop deck, covering 7,000 square feet (650 m^{2}). As built, the Emigrant Savings Bank Building contained ornamental bronze staircases.

==== Banking hall ====
The first floor, formerly the banking hall, contains ceilings 40 feet (12 m) high, marble floors and walls, and floor-to-ceiling windows. It is aligned on a largely north–south axis; anterooms, originally used as officers' quarters, extend west and east from the southern end of the banking room. The interior of the banking hall is made of Arena Pola limestone blocks brought from Istria. Since conversion, the banking hall has contained a three-bedroom "model apartment" as well as a separate event space.

The banking hall is accessed from the central doorway on Chambers Street, which leads to a foyer with marble geometric-patterned floors. A curved marble screen, containing three sets of revolving doors, separates the foyer and the banking hall, and is faced with polished limestone on the banking hall side. Anterooms extend west and east, while the main banking hall extends north, nearly the whole length of the buildings. The walls of the anterooms contain panels with Greek fret designs, as well as bronze plaques with the bank's name and the dates of the bank's founding and the building's year of completion. The northern end of the banking room contains a marble staircase descending to the central doorway on Reade Street.

The main section of the banking hall is rectangular in plan. On the western and eastern walls, the banking hall had marble-and-iron cages for bank tellers. Two mezzanines, enclosed within frosted glass and ornamental bronze, run atop the tellers' cages. The tops of the walls contain an elaborate cornice, which is interrupted at some places by pilasters within the walls. The ceiling is supported by six pairs of large piers, as well as several minor piers on each side; all the piers are attached to the walls, except for the four freestanding piers in the center. At the tops of the piers, arched ribs divide the ceiling into three main parts. The ceiling contains large oval skylights made of stained glass, which depict allegorical figures in various industries. On either side of the banking hall, there are smaller plain-vaulted ceiling sections with rosettes and overhanging chandeliers. The large girders spanning the first floor are enclosed with concrete averaging 3 inches (76 mm) thick.

== History ==
=== Previous structures ===
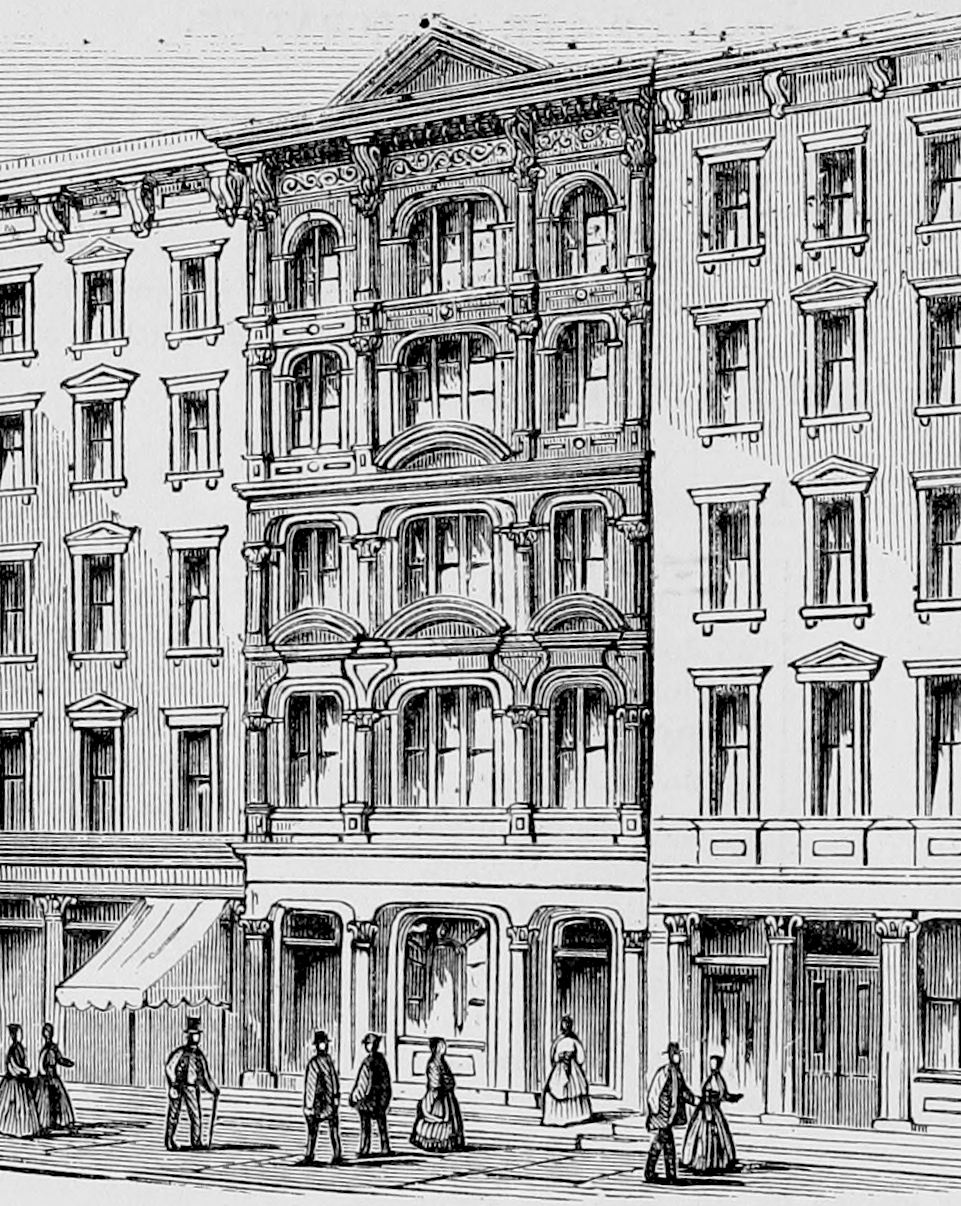
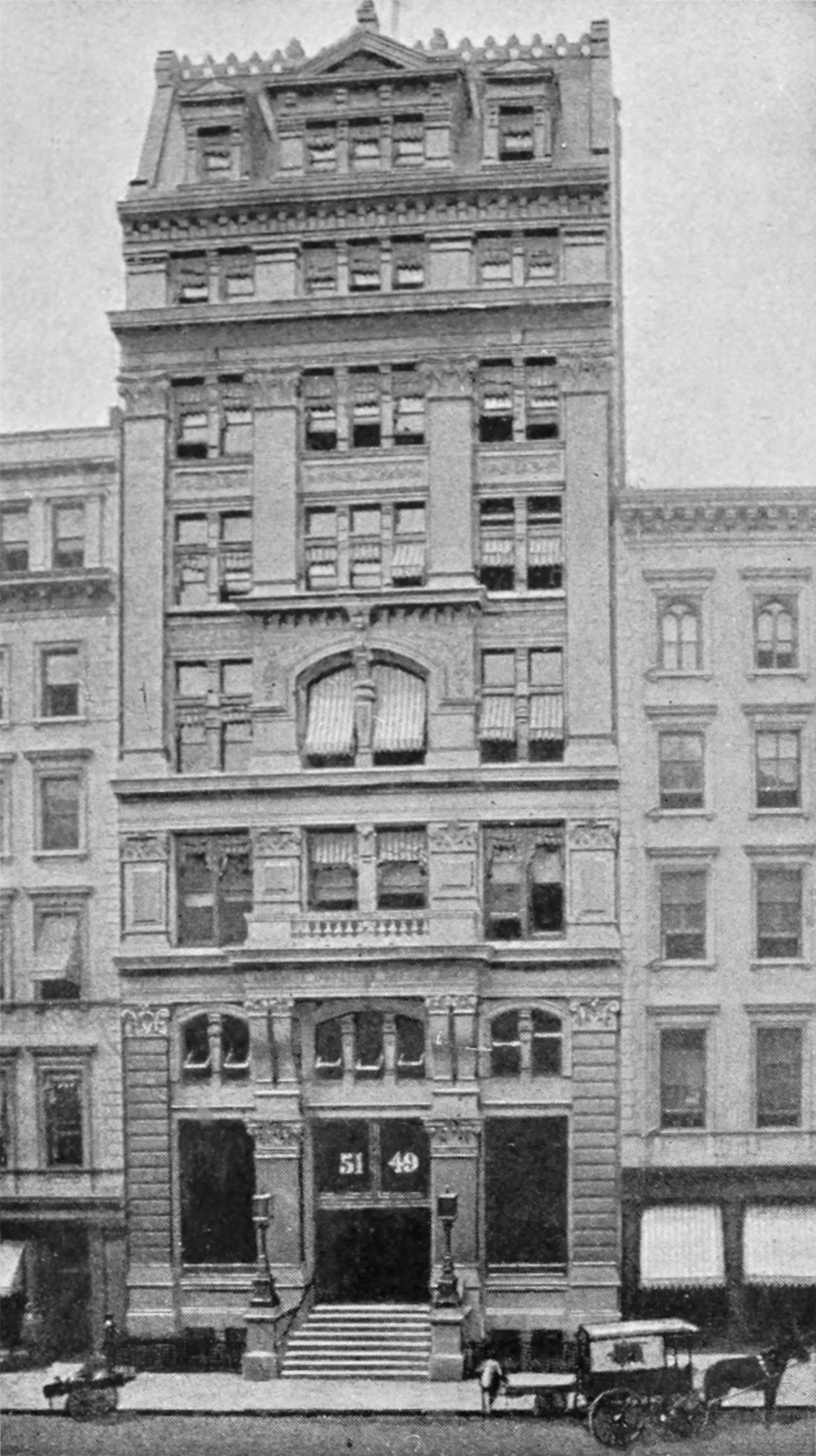
Previous buildings on the site: left, 1858; right, 1887

The Emigrant Bank was organized in 1850 by Roman Catholic Archbishop John Hughes and the Irish Emigrant Society, with the purpose of protecting the savings of Irish immigrants newly arrived in the city. The bank initially occupied a leased property at 51 Chambers Street. In 1858, the Emigrant Bank demolished the structure to create its first new building on the site.

The bank survived the Panic of 1873 and grew rapidly in the subsequent decade, purchasing an adjacent building at 49 Chambers Street in 1882. Three years after the purchase, the bank commissioned William H. Hume and Little & O'Conner to build an eight-story building at the same location. The second bank building, opened in April 1887, was described as being fireproof, with brick floors, iron structural beams, fire-clay partitions, and marble ceilings and walls. The granite facade, rusticated at the base, was topped by a mansard roof.

=== Construction ===
In September 1907, the Century Realty Company and Alliance Realty Company sold the lots between 43 and 47 Chambers Street for about $1 million in cash. These lots contained a five-story building that the Russell & Erwin Manufacturing Company had occupied "for many years"; the company had sold their structure to the real-estate companies in 1906 and was planning to move elsewhere. Emigrant Bank was announced as the buyer in October 1907. Almirall was hired to design the new bank building, and started devising plans in 1908. The bank intended to hold the building as an investment.

The start of the project was delayed due to uncertainty over the site of the Manhattan Municipal Building. The site bounded by Broadway and Reade, Centre, and Chambers Streets had periodically been proposed for the Municipal Building's site. By 1908, the city decided to erect the Municipal Building one block east of the Emigrant Bank site. Construction on the new Emigrant Savings Bank Building started by August 1909. During construction, large cracks developed in the old structure, which was subsequently shored up. The building was completed by 1912.

=== Bank and office use ===
==== Bank ownership ====
Emigrant Savings Bank initially took up the banking hall, while the other floors were rented out. The New York Supreme Court announced in March 1912 that it would take up the 13th floor and half of the 12th floor at the Emigrant Savings Bank Building. The Supreme Court, which had a shortage of space in the Tweed Courthouse (then known as the New York County Courthouse), would have chambers measuring 15 by 25 feet (4.6 by 7.6 m) in the Emigrant Savings Bank Building, as well as a judicial library. Another early tenant was the Associated Press, which moved from the Western Union Telegraph Building in 1914. Meanwhile, Emigrant Savings Bank had seen an increase in deposits in the years after its new building was completed. In 1931, the bank started a safe-deposit service, adding new vaults in the building's basement.

In 1964, the government of New York City received authorization to buy the Emigrant Savings Bank Building and several surrounding plots, which would be demolished to make way for a new Civic Center municipal building. Three years later, the city government notified Emigrant Savings Bank that the building was to be demolished. The bank closed its Chambers Street location in 1969, moving to a temporary location on Broadway. The redevelopment plans were ultimately scrapped due to the 1975 New York City fiscal crisis, but the city retained ownership of the Emigrant Savings Bank Building.

==== City government ownership ====
After the city government took over the Emigrant Savings Bank Building, the upper floors were used by several city agencies. An off-track betting booth opened at the building in 1971, after off-track betting in New York was legalized. The banking hall became the quarters of the New York City Parking Violations Bureau starting in 1973. The building also housed the Satellite Academy High School for two decades until 1999, when the city government forced the school to move elsewhere.

The Municipal Service Administration requested $3.25 million in 1974 to renovate the Emigrant Savings Bank Building. The city agencies in the building lacked sufficient space, but the Emigrant Savings Bank Building was not renovated at the time because the Civic Center development was considered to be on hold, rather than formally canceled. By 1978, the New York City Department of Buildings planned to renovate the main banking hall, removing much decorative detail in the process. Paul Goldberger, architecture writer for The New York Times, criticized the plans, calling the banking hall "irreplaceable" and "the one real asset that this near-bankrupt city has". Following opposition to the proposal, the city subsequently dropped the renovation plans.

By 1994, the building was described as dilapidated. After the September 11 attacks in 2001, an aid center was opened in the Emigrant Savings Bank Building in 2002, moving from Pier 94 on the Hudson River. The bank building was used for the filming of movies such as Spike Lee's 2008 film Miracle at St. Anna, and also hosted New York City mayor Michael Bloomberg's 2006 inaugural gala. During a 2010 renovation of City Hall, the New York City Council convened some meetings in the Emigrant Savings Bank Building.

=== Condominium conversion ===
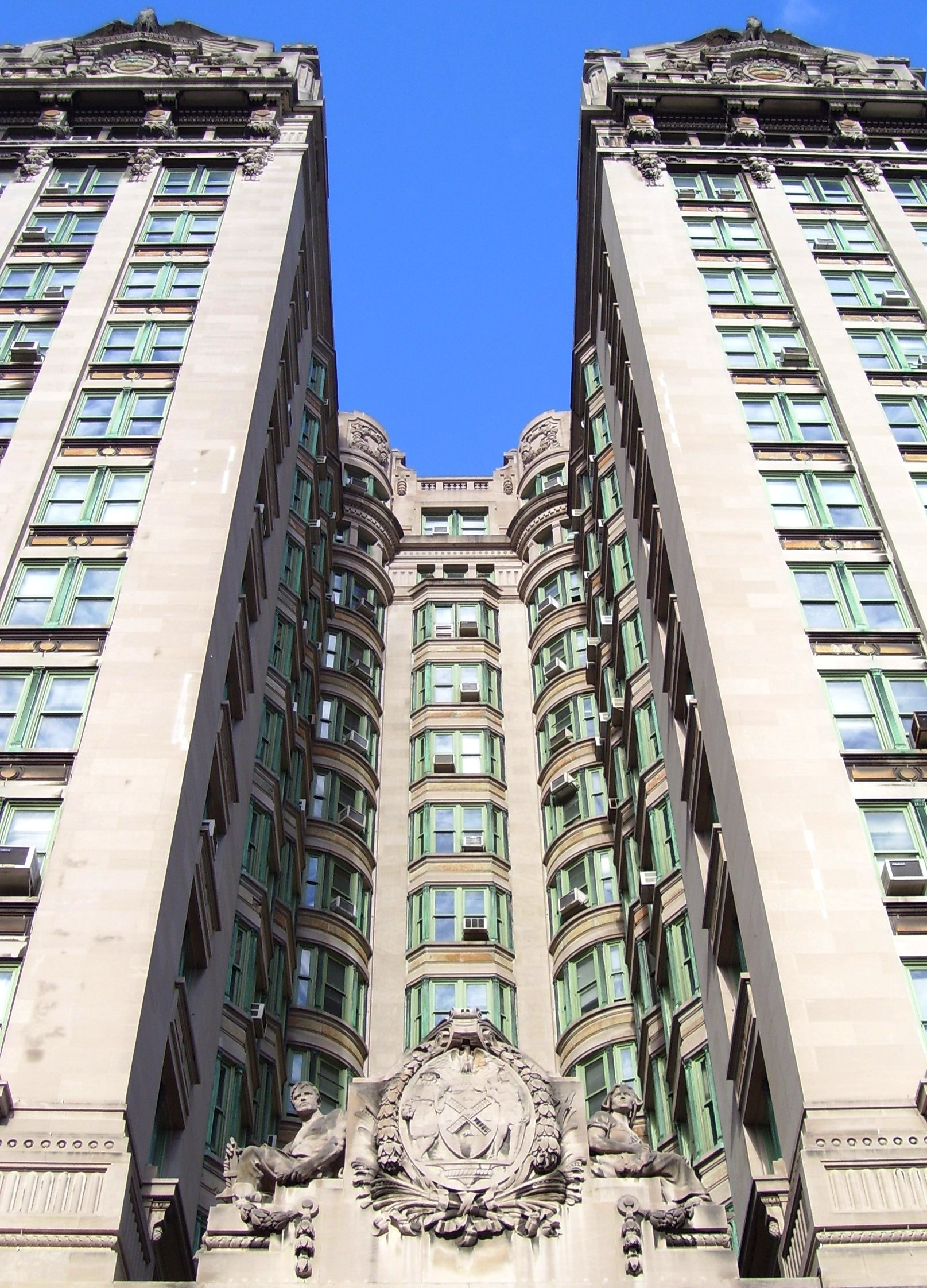
The interior light court of the building, seen from below

The Chetrit Group bought the Emigrant Savings Bank Building from the city for $89 million in 2013; this was part of a $250 million deal that also involved the sale of 346 Broadway to the Peebles Corporation. The New York City government sold the buildings in an attempt to reduce the amount of office space that it owned. Chetrit converted the Emigrant Savings Bank Building into condominiums and renamed the building to 49 Chambers. In 2016, the developer received a $194 million loan for the conversion from SL Green Realty and Acore Capital, who also took over an existing $85 million loan that MSD Capital had given to the project. In an offering plan filed with the New York Attorney General the same year, the developers indicated that they planned to offer 81 apartments. Woods Bagot was hired to renovate the space, as well as to restore decorative elements and other historic motifs in the building. The interiors were converted by Gabellini Sheppard Associates. Chetrit also commissioned architectural historian Thomas Mellins, who wrote an essay about 49 Chambers' architecture and history.

Chetrit launched sales of the units in April 2017. However, because of a lack of demand for the condominiums, Chetrit offered to give buyers' agents half of their commission upon the signing of a contract. The owner retired its $194 million loan in January 2019, and SL Green gave Chetrit a $204 million loan. In July 2020, French museum operator Culturespaces announced that a digital art museum named Hall des Lumières would open within 49 Chambers' banking hall. Hall des Lumières's opening was postponed to September 14, 2022, when the space hosted a Gustav Klimt art installation.

== Landmark designations ==
The building was added to the National Register of Historic Places on February 25, 1982. The New York City Landmarks Preservation Commission designated 49 Chambers' exterior and first-floor interior as city landmarks on July 9, 1985. The interior-landmark designation was slightly modified in 1996 after chandeliers in the banking hall were restored.

49 Chambers is also located within two historic districts. It is part of the African Burial Ground and the Commons Historic District, which was designated a city landmark district in 1993. The building is also part of the African Burial Ground Historic District, a National Historic Landmark District.

== See also ==
- List of New York City Designated Landmarks in Manhattan below 14th Street
- National Register of Historic Places listings in Manhattan below 14th Street
