= David Wilber =

American politician

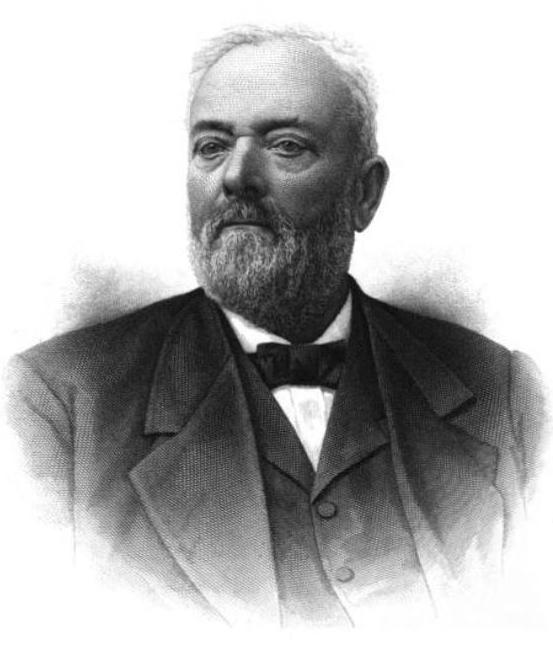

Member of the U.S. House of Representatives from New York
- In office March 4, 1873 – March 3, 1875
- Preceded by: Clinton L. Merriam
- Succeeded by: Henry H. Hathorn
- Constituency: 20th district
- In office March 4, 1879 – March 3, 1881
- Preceded by: Solomon Bundy
- Succeeded by: Ferris Jacobs Jr.
- Constituency: 21st district
- In office March 4, 1887 – April 1, 1890
- Preceded by: John S. Pindar
- Succeeded by: George Van Horn
- Constituency: 24th district

Personal details
- Born: October 5, 1820 Quaker Street, Duanesburg, New York, U.S.
- Died: April 1, 1890 (aged 69) Oneonta, New York, U.S.
- Party: Republican

David Wilber (October 5, 1820 – April 1, 1890) was a United States representative from New York.

== Early life ==
Born near Quaker Street, a hamlet in Duanesburg, New York, he moved with his parents to Milford, Otsego County, N.Y.; attended the common schools; engaged in the lumbering trade, hop business, and agricultural pursuits; member of the board of supervisors of Otsego County in 1858, 1859, 1862, 1865, and 1866; director of the Albany and Susquehanna Railroad; director of the Second National Bank of Cooperstown, N.Y.; president of the Wilber National Bank of Oneonta 1874 - 1890.

== Personal life ==
David Wilber was married on January 1, 1845, to Margaret Belinda Jones. They had two sons, David F. Wilber and George I. Wilber.

== Political career ==
David Wilber was elected as a Republican to the Forty-third Congress, where he served from March 4, 1873, to March 3, 1875. He was not a candidate for renomination in 1874, however, Wilber was elected to the Forty-sixth Congress (March 4, 1879 - March 3, 1881). Yet again, he was not a candidate for renomination in 1880. He served as a delegate to the Republican National Conventions in 1880 and 1888 while moving to Oneonta, New York in 1886. He then ran again and soon was elected as a Republican to the Fiftieth Congress. This time he was a candidate for renomination and was reelected to the Fifty-first Congress, but owing to ill health took the oath of office at his home and never attended a session. This caused him to only serve from March 4, 1887, up until his death.

== Death ==
He died on April 1, 1890, in Oneonta, New York and was buried there in Glenwood Cemetery.

== See also ==
- List of members of the United States Congress who died in office (1790–1899)

U.S. House of Representatives
Preceded by Clinton L. Merriam	Member of the U.S. House of Representatives from New York's 20th congressional district 1873–1875	Succeeded by Henry H. Hathorn
Preceded by Solomon Bundy	Member of the U.S. House of Representatives from New York's 21st congressional district 1879–1881	Succeeded by Ferris Jacobs, Jr.
Preceded by John S. Pindar	Member of the U.S. House of Representatives from New York's 24th congressional district 1887–1890	Succeeded by George Van Horn
