= Solomon Bundy =

American politician (1823–1889)

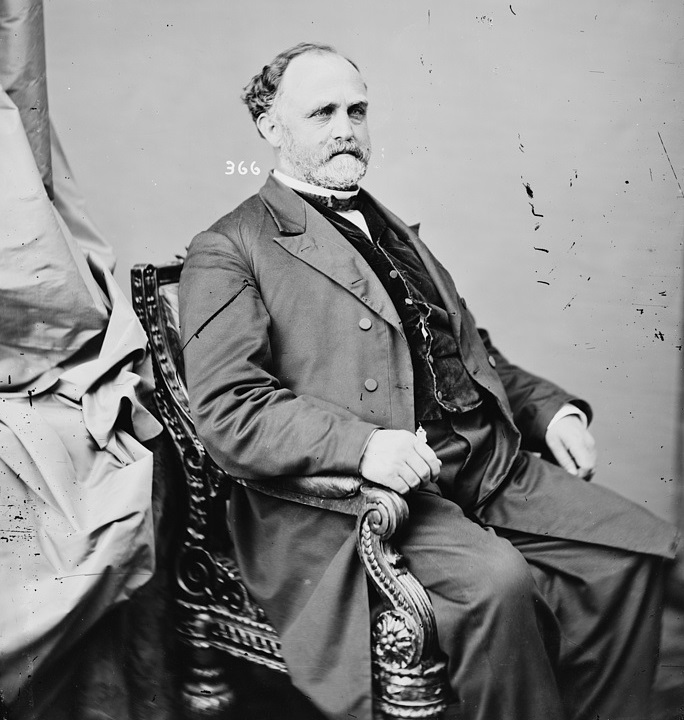

Member of the U.S. House of Representatives from New York's 21st district
- In office March 4, 1877 – March 3, 1879
- Preceded by: Samuel F. Miller
- Succeeded by: David Wilber

Personal details
- Born: May 22, 1823 Oxford, New York, U.S.
- Died: January 13, 1889 (aged 65) Oxford, New York, U.S.
- Party: Republican

Solomon Bundy (May 22, 1823 – January 13, 1889) was an American attorney and politician, a United States representative from New York. He had earlier served as district attorney of Chenango County, New York.

== Early life and education ==
Solomon Bundy was born in Oxford, Chenango County in 1823, in a period of development in western New York. He attended Oxford Academy. He taught school for several years, and read the law; he was admitted to the bar in 1859 and commenced practice in Oxford. While studying law, he served as justice of the peace and clerk of the Board of Supervisors of Chenango County.

== Law career ==
After being admitted to the bar and practicing law, Bundy was elected as district attorney of Chenango County (1862–1865). He was elected as a Republican to the Forty-fifth Congress (March 4, 1877 - March 3, 1879). He was not a candidate for renomination in 1878.

After his political career ended, he resumed practicing law in Oxford. He died there and was interred in Riverview Cemetery.

== Personal life ==
Bundy married and had a family. His son McGeorge Bundy also became an attorney, moving to Grand Rapids, Michigan, where he settled. McGeorge's son Harvey Hollister Bundy graduated from Yale University and went to law school at Harvard University; he settled in Boston, where he married and had a family. He served at high levels of government with Henry L. Stimson under presidents Herbert Hoover and later under Franklin D. Roosevelt.

Harvey's two sons, William Putnam Bundy and McGeorge Bundy, both became attorneys and served in intelligence during World War II. They served as high-level advisors to presidents John F. Kennedy and Lyndon B. Johnson, particularly related to the Vietnam War.

Bundy's three-times-great-grandson, Jake Auchincloss, is a current Democratic congressman representing Massachusetts's 4th congressional district.

U.S. House of Representatives
Preceded by Samuel F. Miller	Member of the U.S. House of Representatives from New York's 21st congressional district 1877–1879	Succeeded by David Wilber
