= James V. Ganly =

American politician

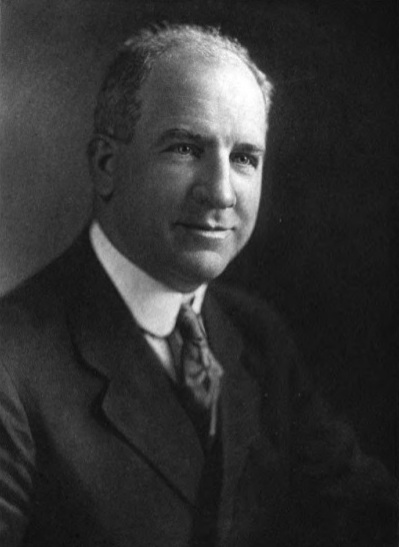
- James V. Ganly, Congressman from New York

Member of the New York State Assembly for New York County, 10th District
- In office 1907–1907
- Preceded by: Samuel Hoffman
- Succeeded by: Anthony M. McCabe

Member of the U.S. House of Representatives from New York's 24th district
- In office March 4, 1919 – March 3, 1921
- Preceded by: Benjamin L. Fairchild
- Succeeded by: Benjamin L. Fairchild
- In office March 4, 1923 – September 7, 1923
- Preceded by: Benjamin L. Fairchild
- Succeeded by: Benjamin L. Fairchild

Personal details
- Born: James Vincent Ganly; September 13, 1878 Manhattan, New York City, New York, U.S.
- Died: September 7, 1923 (aged 44) Manhattan, New York City, New York, U.S.
- Cause of death: Automobile accident
- Resting place: St. Raymond's Cemetery, The Bronx, New York, U.S.
- Party: Democratic

James Vincent Ganly (September 13, 1878 – September 7, 1923) was a U.S. representative from New York. Born in Manhattan, New York City, Ganly attended the public schools and Packard Business College. He engaged in the oil, real estate, and automobile businesses.

== Politics ==
He was a member of the New York State Assembly (New York Co., 24th D.) in 1907. He was the first county clerk of Bronx County 1914–1918. Ganly was elected as a Democrat to the Sixty-sixth Congress, defeating Benjamin L. Fairchild and serving from (March 4, 1919 - March 3, 1921). He was an unsuccessful candidate for reelection in 1920 to the Sixty-seventh Congress, losing to Fairchild.

== Death and burial ==
Ganly was elected to the Sixty-eighth Congress and served from March 4, 1923, until his death in an automobile accident in New York City on September 7, 1923, before the convening of Congress. He was interred in St. Raymond's Cemetery, The Bronx, New York. He was again succeeded in Congress by Fairchild.

== See also ==
- List of members of the United States Congress who died in office (1900–1949)

New York State Assembly
Preceded by Samuel Hoffman	New York State Assembly; New York County, 10th District; 1907	Succeeded by Anthony M. McCabe
U.S. House of Representatives
Preceded by Benjamin L. Fairchild	Member of the U.S. House of Representatives from New York's 24th congressional district March 4, 1919 – March 3, 1921	Succeeded by Benjamin L. Fairchild
Preceded by Benjamin L. Fairchild	Member of the U.S. House of Representatives from New York's 24th congressional district March 4, 1923 – September 7, 1923	Succeeded by Benjamin L. Fairchild
