= Sereno E. Payne =

American politician (1843–1914)

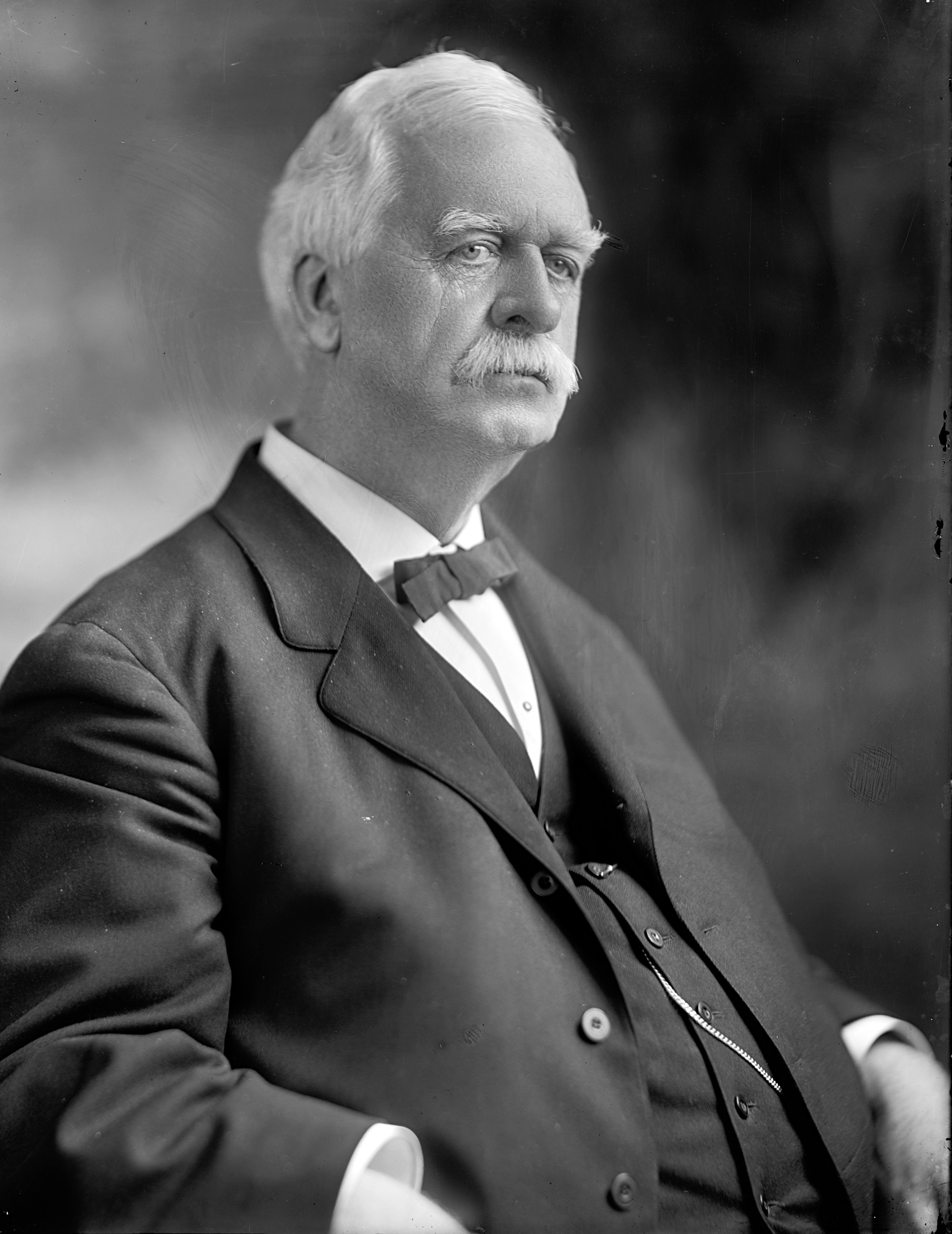
- Payne, 1905–1914

House Majority Leader
- In office March 4, 1899 – March 3, 1911
- Speaker: David B. Henderson (1899–1903); Joseph G. Cannon (1903–1911)
- Preceded by: Office established
- Succeeded by: Oscar Underwood

Member of the U.S. House of Representatives from New York
- In office March 4, 1883 – March 3, 1887
- Preceded by: John H. Camp
- Succeeded by: Newton W. Nutting
- Constituency: 26th district (1883–85); 27th district (1885–87)
- In office December 2, 1889 – December 10, 1914
- Preceded by: Newton W. Nutting
- Succeeded by: Norman J. Gould
- Constituency: 27th district (1889–93); 28th district (1893–1903); 31st district (1903–13); 36th district (1913–14)

Personal details
- Born: Sereno Elisha Payne; June 26, 1843 Hamilton, New York, U.S.
- Died: December 10, 1914 (aged 71) Washington, D.C., U.S.
- Resting place: Fort Hill Cemetery
- Party: Republican
- Spouse: Gertrude Knapp (m. 1873–1911)
- Children: 1
- Education: University of Rochester
- Profession: Law
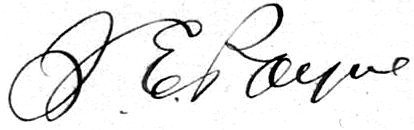
- Signature

Sereno Elisha Payne (June 26, 1843 – December 10, 1914) was a United States representative from New York and the first House majority leader, holding the office from 1899 to 1911. He was a Republican congressman from 1883 to 1887 and then from 1889 to his death in 1914. He was chairman of the House Ways and Means Committee for 12 years starting in 1899. The Payne–Aldrich Tariff is perhaps the most significant legislation he introduced during that period. He was known as a staunch protectionist.

== Early life ==
Sereno Elisha Payne was born on June 26, 1843, in Hamilton, New York, to William Wallace Payne. The family moved to Auburn, New York. He attended the Auburn Academy and then graduated from the University of Rochester in 1864. He studied law and was admitted to the bar in 1866.

== Career ==
Payne practiced law in Auburn, rising to become the Cayuga County district attorney from 1873 to 1879. Payne served in a number of administrative roles for the city of Auburn, as city clerk in 1867 to 1868, supervisor in 1871 to 1872, and president of the board of education from 1879 to 1882. He was appointed a member of the American-British Joint High Commission in January 1899.

Payne was elected as a Republican to the Forty-eighth and Forty-ninth Congresses (March 4, 1883 – March 3, 1887). He was elected into the Fifty-first Congress to fill the vacancy caused by the death of Representative Newton W. Nutting and was reelected to the twelve succeeding Congresses (December 2, 1889 – December 10, 1914). During his tenure, he served as chairman of the Committee on Merchant Marine and Fisheries (Fifty-fourth and Fifty-fifth Congresses), chairman of the Ways and Means Committee (Fifty-fifth through Sixty-first Congresses), and majority leader (Fifty-seventh through Sixty-first Congresses). He was reelected to the Sixty-fourth Congress but died before that term began. He was an advocate for protectionism and wrote the Payne–Aldrich Tariff. He was a delegate to the 1892, 1896, 1900 and the 1904 Republican National Conventions.

== Personal life ==
Payne married Gertrude Flourette Knapp, daughter of Arietta Montgomery Terry and Oscar Fitzalen Knapp, of Auburn in 1873. They had one son, William K. His wife died in 1911. He lived in Auburn throughout his life. He had a home at 4 James Street in Auburn.

Payne died of heart disease on December 10, 1914, at the Portland Hotel in Washington, D.C.. He was buried in Fort Hill Cemetery in Auburn.

== Awards ==
Colgate University and the University of Rochester awarded Payne with honorary LLD degrees.

== See also ==
- List of members of the United States Congress who died in office (1900–1949)

U.S. House of Representatives
Preceded by None (new office)	House Majority Leader; 1899–1911	Succeeded by Oscar W. Underwood; Alabama
Preceded by John H. Camp	Member of the U.S. House of Representatives from New York's 26th congressional district March 4, 1883 – March 3, 1885	Succeeded by Stephen C. Millard
Preceded by James W. Wadsworth	Member of the U.S. House of Representatives from New York's 27th congressional district March 4, 1885 – March 3, 1887	Succeeded by Newton W. Nutting
Preceded by Newton W. Nutting	Member of the U.S. House of Representatives from New York's 27th congressional district December 2, 1889 – March 3, 1893	Succeeded by James J. Belden
Preceded by Hosea H. Rockwell	Member of the U.S. House of Representatives from New York's 28th congressional district March 4, 1893 – March 3, 1903	Succeeded by Charles L. Knapp
Preceded by James B. Perkins	Member of the U.S. House of Representatives from New York's 31st congressional district March 4, 1903 – March 3, 1913	Succeeded by Edwin A. Merritt
Preceded by Charles B. Smith	Member of the U.S. House of Representatives from New York's 36th congressional district March 4, 1913 – December 10, 1914	Succeeded by Norman J. Gould
