= Leo Isacson =

American politician (1910–1996)

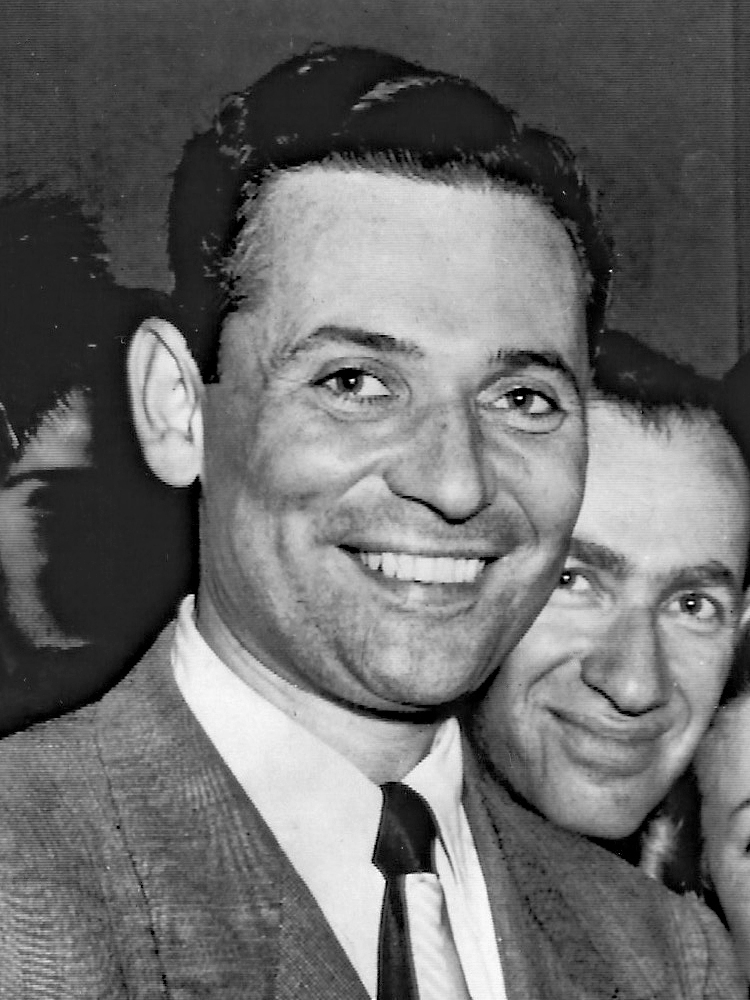
- Isacson in 1948

Member of the U.S. House of Representatives from New York's 24th district
- In office February 17, 1948 – January 3, 1949
- Preceded by: Benjamin J. Rabin
- Succeeded by: Isidore Dollinger

Member of the New York State Assembly from the 13th Bronx district
- In office January 1, 1945 – December 31, 1946
- Preceded by: Constituency established
- Succeeded by: William J. Drohan

Personal details
- Born: April 20, 1910 New York, New York, U.S.
- Died: September 21, 1996 (aged 86) Fort Lauderdale, Florida, U.S.
- Party: American Labor
- Other political affiliations: Republican; Progressive (1948–1955)
- Spouse(s): Rose (m. 1937; died 1988) Violet (m. 1990)
- Children: 2
- Education: New York University; New York University School of Law

Leo Leous Isacson (April 20, 1910 – September 21, 1996) was a New York attorney and politician. He won a 1948 special election to the United States House of Representatives from New York's twenty-fourth district (Bronx) as the candidate of the American Labor Party in what The New York Times called "a test of Truman-[versus]-Wallace strength" with regard to the upcoming U.S. presidential elections and a "test today of the third-party movement headed by Henry A. Wallace".

== Early life ==
Leo Isacson was born on April 20, 1910, in Manhattan, New York City, New York to a Jewish family. He had two sisters, Ruth (later Thielle) and Regina (later Hymowitz). He attended the public schools, then graduated from New York University in 1931 and New York University School of Law in 1933.

== Career ==
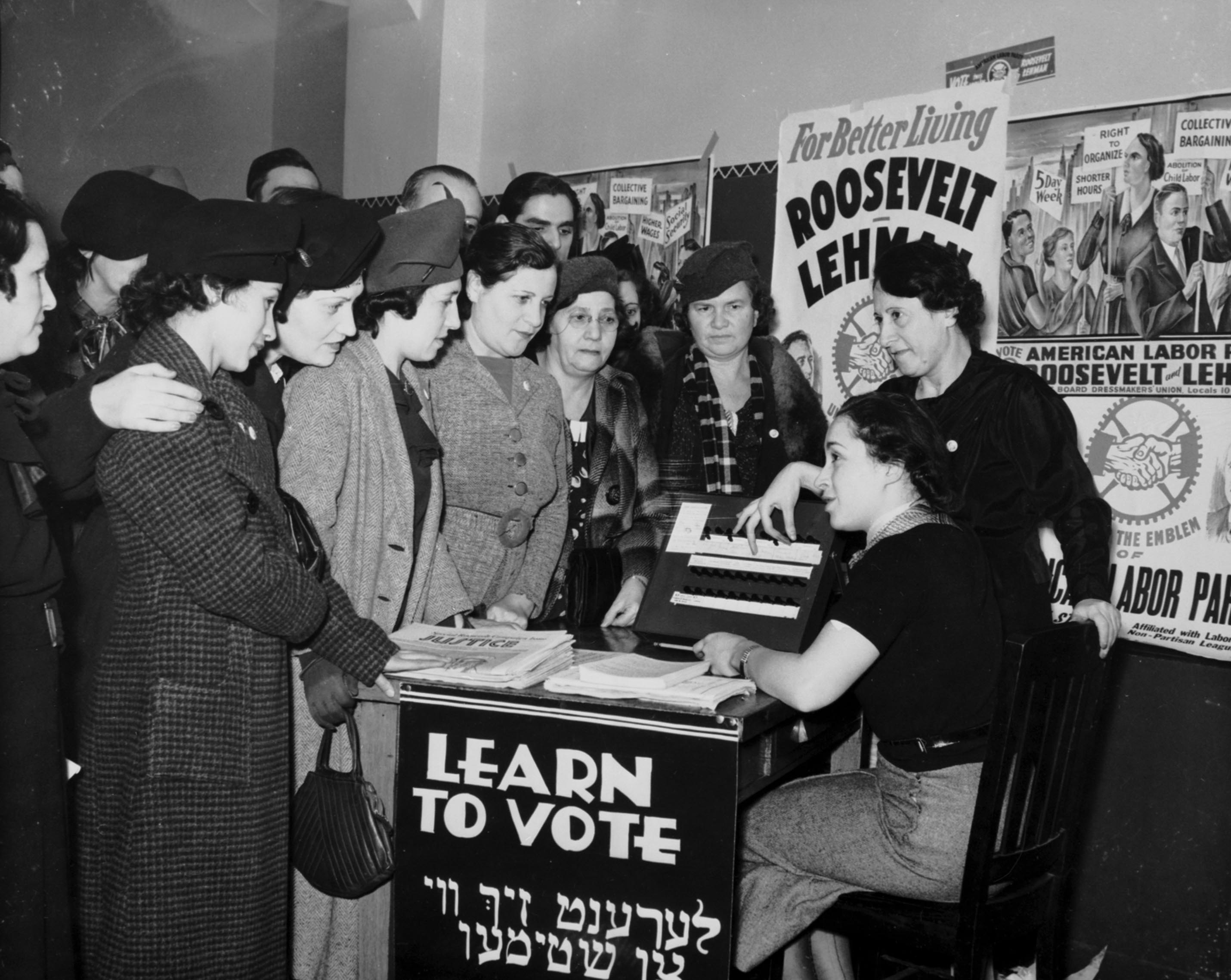
Women supporting Franklin D. Roosevelt, Herbert H. Lehman, and the American Labor Party teach other women how to vote in 1936, the year in which Isacson first joined the ALP

Isacson was admitted to the bar in 1933 or 1934 and commenced practice in New York City. He defended labor and tenant cases.

In 1936, Isacson became a member at the founding of the American Labor Party (ALP, which sought to advance the cause of trade unions).

=== New York State Assembly ===
In 1944, he was elected to represent the Bronx County 13th District in the New York State Assembly as the candidate of the ALP and the Republican Party, and he served from 1945 to 1946 as a member of the 165th New York State Legislature. He lost re-election in 1946.

In 1945, while serving in the Assembly, Isacson ran for Borough President of the Bronx, coming in second with 25% of the vote.

On January 6, 1947, the ALP named Isacson their "legislative representative".

=== 1948 special Bronx election ===
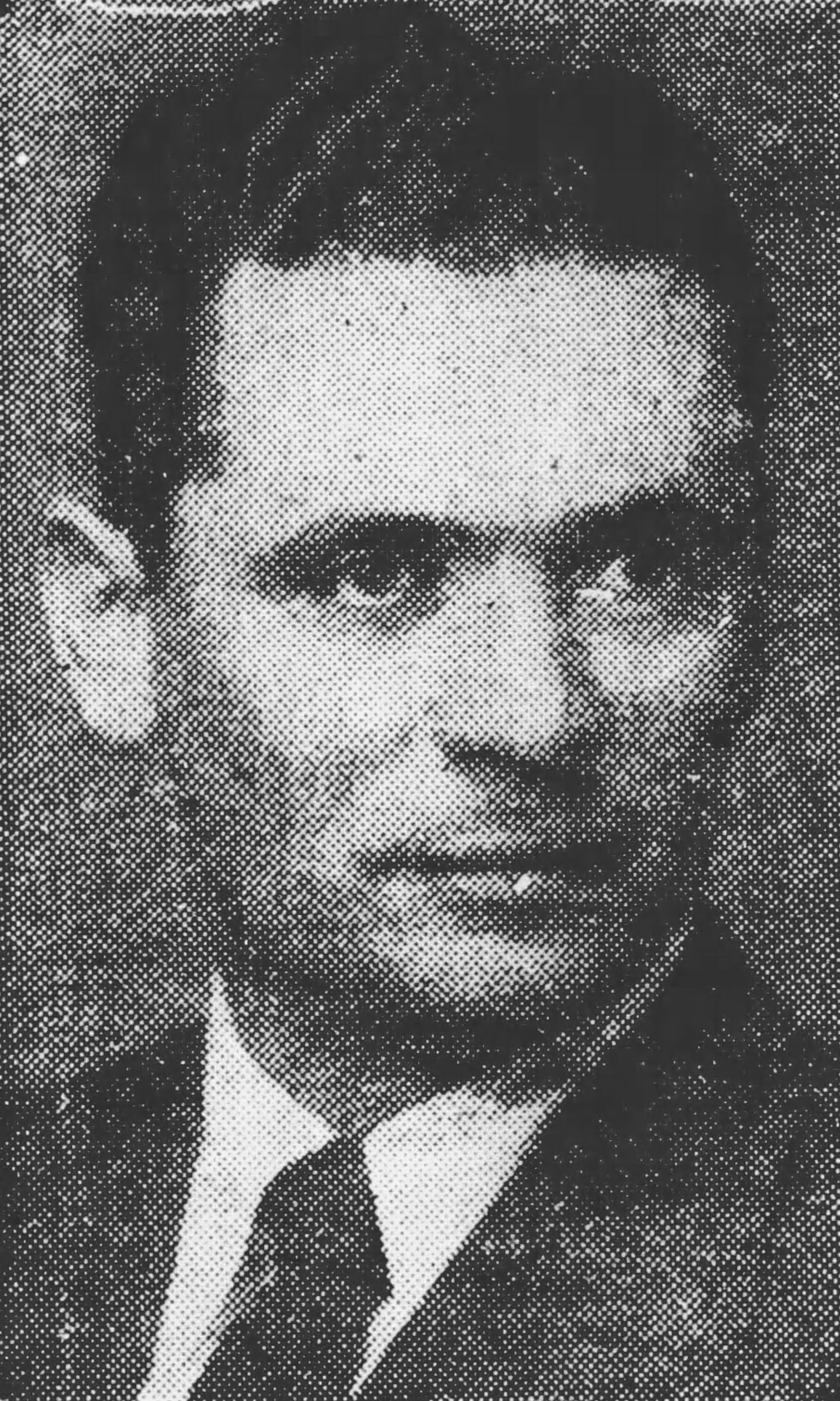
Portrait of Isacson published in The Daily Worker, January 22, 1948

On February 17, 1948, a special election was held to fill the vacancy caused by the resignation of U.S. Representative Benjamin J. Rabin after his election to the New York Supreme Court (a local trial court in New York State). The Democratic nominee was Karl Propper, a former president of the Bronx Bar Association, and his supporters included Eleanor Roosevelt and New York City Mayor William O'Dwyer. Isacson, the ALP nominee, received public support, first on January 24 from the Greater New York CIO Council, then on February 11 by radio and February 15 in a speech from former U.S. Vice President Henry A. Wallace.

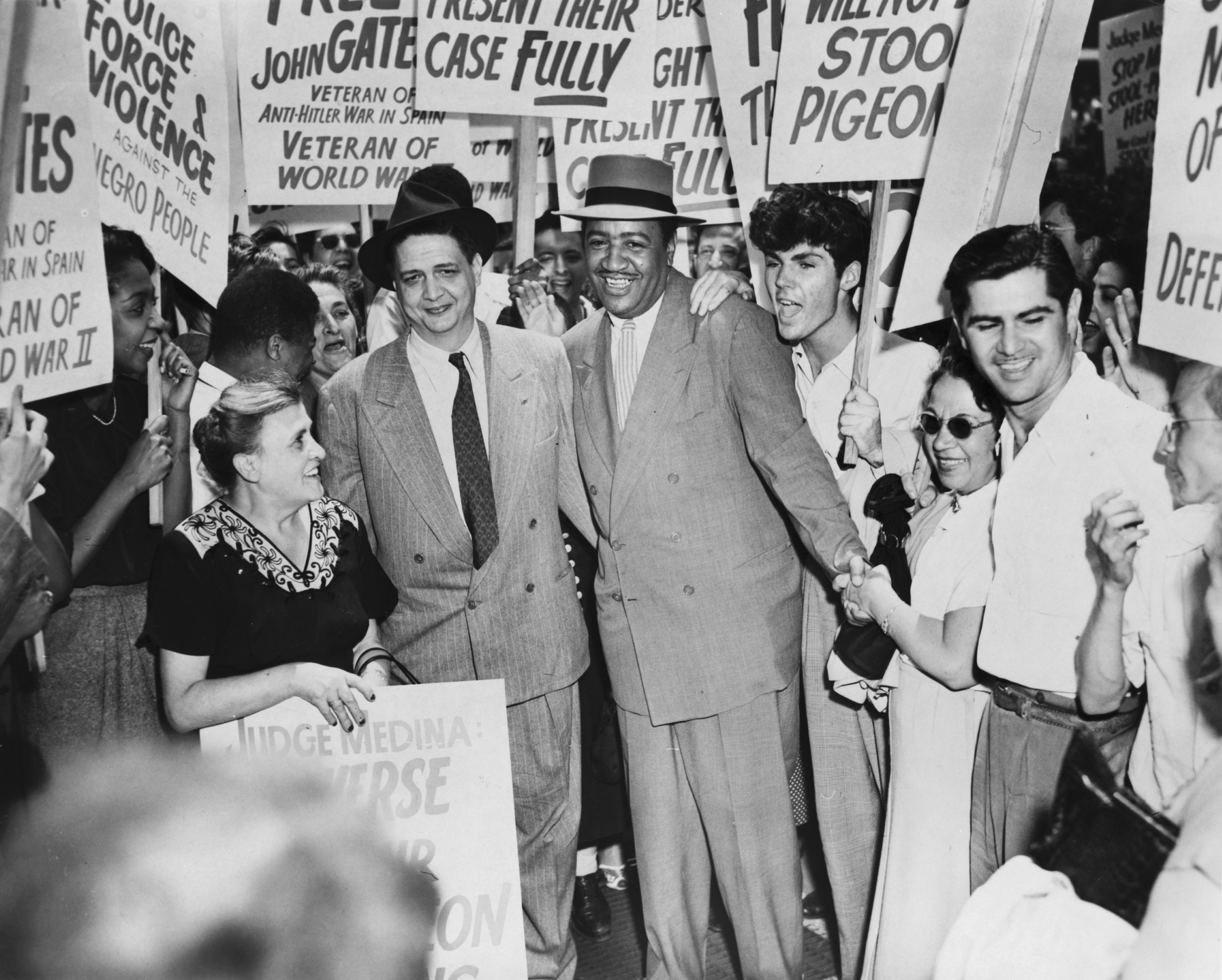
In the late 1940s, FBI targeted alleged communist supporters, from unions to politicians (including ALP congressman Vito Marcantonio and Leo Isacson), as well as Communist leaders like Robert Thompson and Benjamin J. Davis (above)

During the election, the Greater New York CIO Council charged that FBI agents had been visiting offices of "left wing" CIO locals to "intimidate them and curtail their political activity in behalf of Henry A. Wallace". In contrast, the Amalgamated Clothing Workers of America (ACWA), a more conservative CIO union opposed to Wallace, confirmed that FBI agents had visited many of its locals to investigate possible violations of the Hatch Act of 1939, regarding political activities, and declared the FBI had given the ACWA a "clean bill of health". The spokesman said similar inquiries had been made among other CIO and AFL unions pursuant to the law. The council also telegraphed U.S. Attorney General Tom C. Clark to ask him to call off further FBI investigation. The Council admitted that, while FBI agents had always asked permission to check records of CIO-PAC contributions, these records were already available from the Secretary of State of New York and the New York City Board of Elections, leading the council to question the FBI's motives. The Council claimed that the FBI's investigation was "an obvious and reprehensible attempt to intimidate and harass unions and union members in the exercise of their political rights, particularly with respect to the 1948 Presidential and Congressional elections". Nathan Witt, the council's legal counselor, disagreed, stating, "There could not possibly be any technical violation in 1948 except for the Isacson election and the FBI agents made clear they were not investigating that."

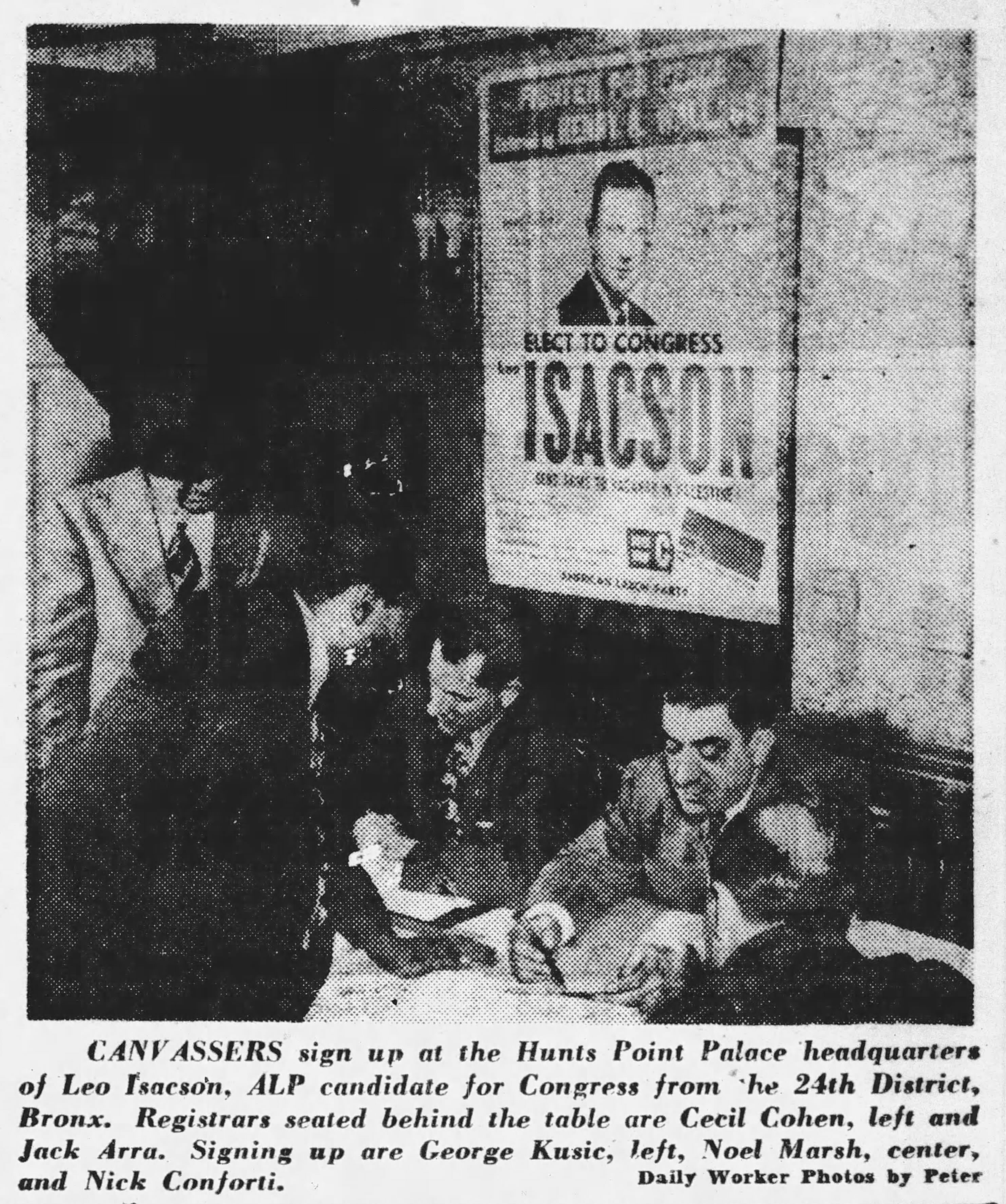
Clipping from The Daily Worker, February 6, 1948

During the campaign, Mayor O'Dwyer made front-page headlines when he urged Wallace to leave the Progressive Party and rejoin the Democratic Party. In a speech, O'Dwyer said, "The election of 1948 will result in the choice of either the Democratic or the Republican party," ruling out any chance of election of the Wallace ticket and reminded voters that "the Democratic party is by its very nature the party of labor, of small business, small farmers and independents–the backbone of our economy, the overwhelming mass of our population." Wallace rejected O'Dwyer's plea in his speech the next day and stood side by side with Isacson in front of crowds. Meanwhile, Adolf A. Berle, co-founder of the recently formed Liberal Party, denounced Wallace as a "front for an international intrigue". Berle claimed that Wallace wanted to "appease Russia" in the same way Neville Chamberlain sought to appease Nazi Germany.

Two days before the election, The New York Times analyzed the shifting background of the Progressive Party:

The question involved in the special election is how strongly the Labor [ALP] party vote will hold up after withdrawal of the Amalgamated Clothing Workers of America and other anti-Communist unions from the Labor party because of its support of Mr. Wallace's candidacy for President, which has left the Communists and other left-wing elements in complete control of that party's organization.

In a stunning victory, Isacson beat Propper with 22,697 votes (55.8%) to 12,598 votes (31%), with Dean Alfange of the Liberal Party at 3,840 votes and Republican Joseph A. De Nigris with 1,482. New York CIO Council secretary Saul Mills said shortly before the election:

This is the first test of labor's independent political strength in the crucial 1948 elections. We are confident we can prove that strength and give the '48 campaign a proper sendoff with the election of Leo Isacson.

=== "Wallace" victory ===
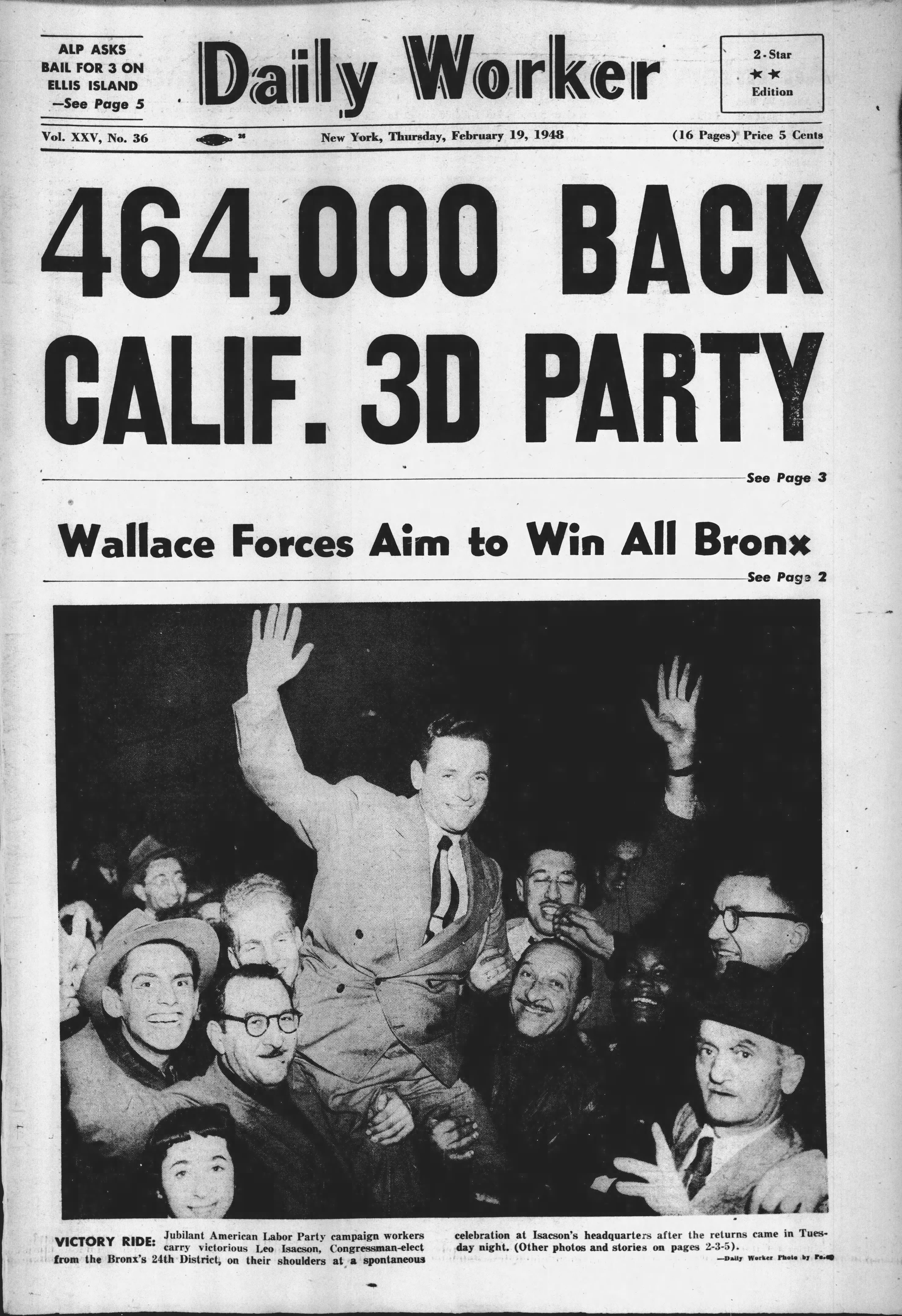
Front page of The Daily Worker, February 19, 1948

The Washington Post declared "Henry A. Wallace yesterday jolted Democratic hopes of holding New York in November" with the election of the ALP's Isacson and noted that it was "Wallace's first test at the polls since he broke with the Democratic Administration to form a third party and make his own bid for the Presidency".

The New York Times stated that the election of the ALP's Isacson over the Democratic candidate Propper would have many effects, including that:

1. Wallace, as a third-party presidential candidate, would poll a much larger vote than expected, i.e., that Truman had little chance of winning New York State in the 1948 general elections
2. Wallace had a better chance in other states, as did other third-party candidates for Congressional and local offices
3. New York Governor Thomas E. Dewey might not clinch the Republican nomination but rather U.S. Senator Robert A. Taft
4. Both the Democratic National Committee and the Bronx Democratic organization had suffered a major setback
5. The New York State Assembly would ask Mayor O'Dwyer to hold off on a rise in fare for mass transportation

The next day, Wallace announced that his Progressive Party had won a place in the California primaries.

Two days later, The Washington Post was still assessing the implications of Bronx congressional election:

The outcome of Tuesday's special election in New York's Twenty-fourth Congressional District confirms what most political commentators have for some time surmised that Henry Wallace, if he wishes to do so, can deprive the Democratic candidate of New York State's 47 electoral votes next November. Thus, as a political portent, the election possesses great significance which will not be lost upon the kingmakers in either of the major parties.

The Post also believed that (in retrospect, just four months before declaration of the State of Israel) "According to all seasoned political observers, it was the Palestine issue that gave the victory to Leo Isacson, the Henry Wallace-American Labor Party candidate, in the special congressional election in the Bronx. This overwhelming upset of the strong Bronx machine of Edward J. Flynn indicates what political dynamite there is in Palestine, for a President now eagerly seeking reelection and clearly dependent on carrying such States as New York" (the "President" here referring to Truman).

On February 21, 1948, the Progressive Party formed its Michigan chapter.

On February 23, 1948, The New York Times was still analyzing the election in an article whose headline read "Isacson's Victory Is Aid to Wallace in Major States" with the subtitle "Adds Strength to Third-Party Movement for Presidency, A Survey Discloses". The Times stated that Wallace had gained Electoral College support in the states of Michigan, Illinois, Pennsylvania, and California.

However, on February 25, 1948, the victory was diminished somewhat when Simon W. Gerson, candidate for the New York City Council to fill the seat of the late communist council member Peter V. Cacchione, found himself denied a council seat when council members voted 14 to 4 against him. The four council members who supported his candidacy were: Benjamin J. Davis Jr. ("Harlem Communist"), Michael J. Quill ("Bronx Laborite"), Eugene P. Connolly ("Manhattan Laborite"), and Stanley M. Isaacs ("Manhattan Republican"). Afterwards, "warning that "all the Wallace forces are behind the seating of Mr. Gerson, Mr. Connolly said he would introduce another resolution to seat him at a later date." Councilman Edward Rager ("Manhattan Republican") said the underlying issue over Gerson was Communism; Rager also said Communists were "largely responsible" for Leo Isacson's election. Quill, who had supported Isacson, "denied that Communists had won that election".

=== U.S. Congress ===
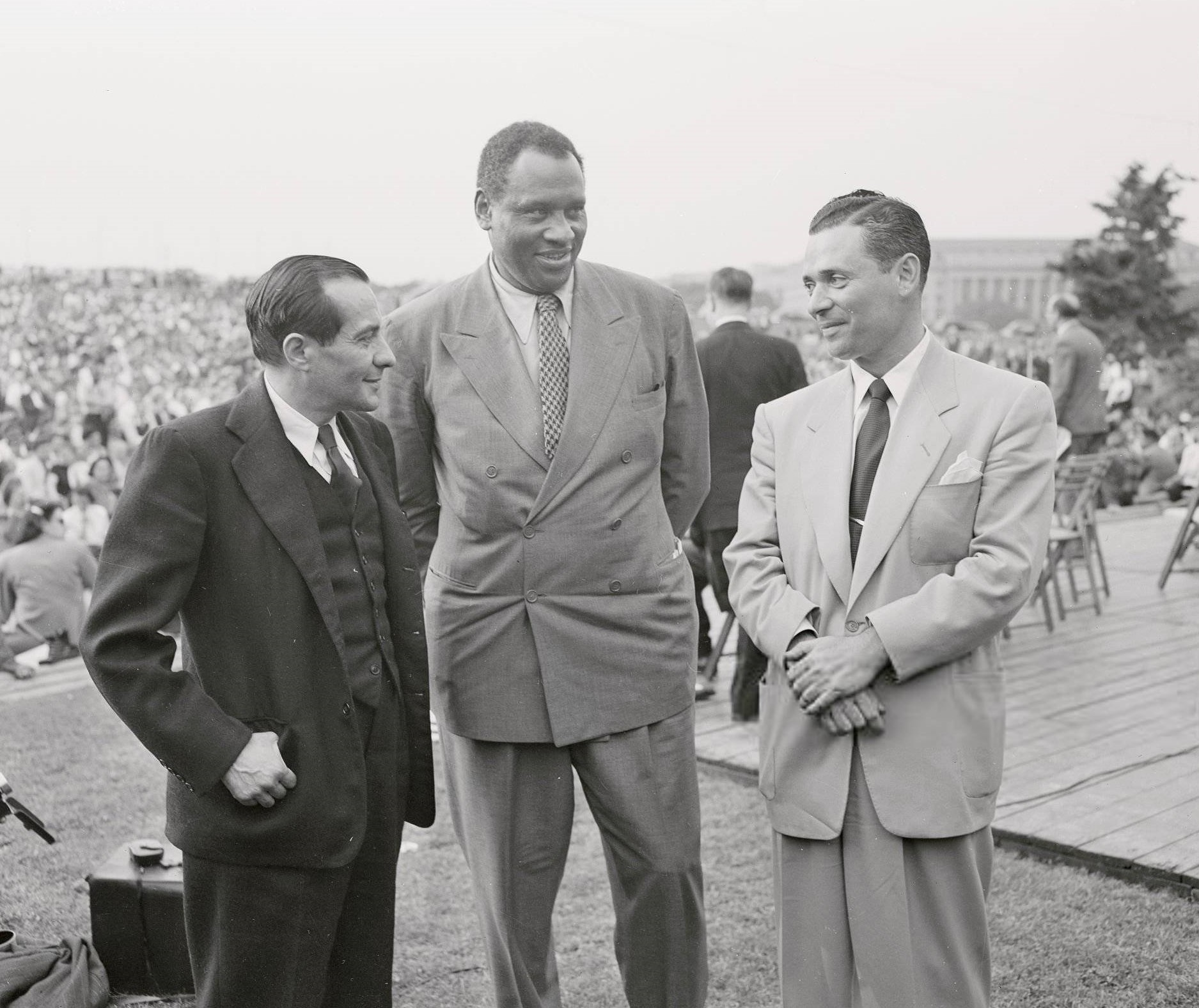
Isacson (right) with Vito Marcantonio and Paul Robeson at an event in Washington, D.C. protesting the Mundt Bill, June 1, 1948

Isacson served from February 17, 1948, to January 3, 1949.

By one measure, Isacson was the second most liberal person to serve in Congress between 1937 and 2002 (second only to William H. Meyer of Vermont). He opposed the Marshall Plan and the peacetime draft, and was one of three congressmen to oppose legislation to increase the size of the Air Force. He also pushed for immediate recognition of the State of Israel. Some contemporary publications have labeled him a socialist.

He also changed the situation for fellow ALP New York Representative Vito Marcantonio. Until Isacson's election, as commentator Drew Pearson wrote at the time:

Rambunctious, left-wing Representative Vito Marcantonio of New York has long been "majority leader," the "party whip," and the total membership of the American Labor Party in Congress. He has labored alone–a situation perfectly okay with Vito, for he likes to consider himself a modern David jousting with the "big interests".

In March 1948, he continued public speaking in New York City on topics that included Palestine, thanks to sponsorship that included the ALP and the Progressive Citizens of America. Isacson joined fellow New York ALP representative Vito Marcantonio and Democrats in voting unsuccessfully against an "unprecedented" $200,000 appropriation to the House Un-American Activities Committee.

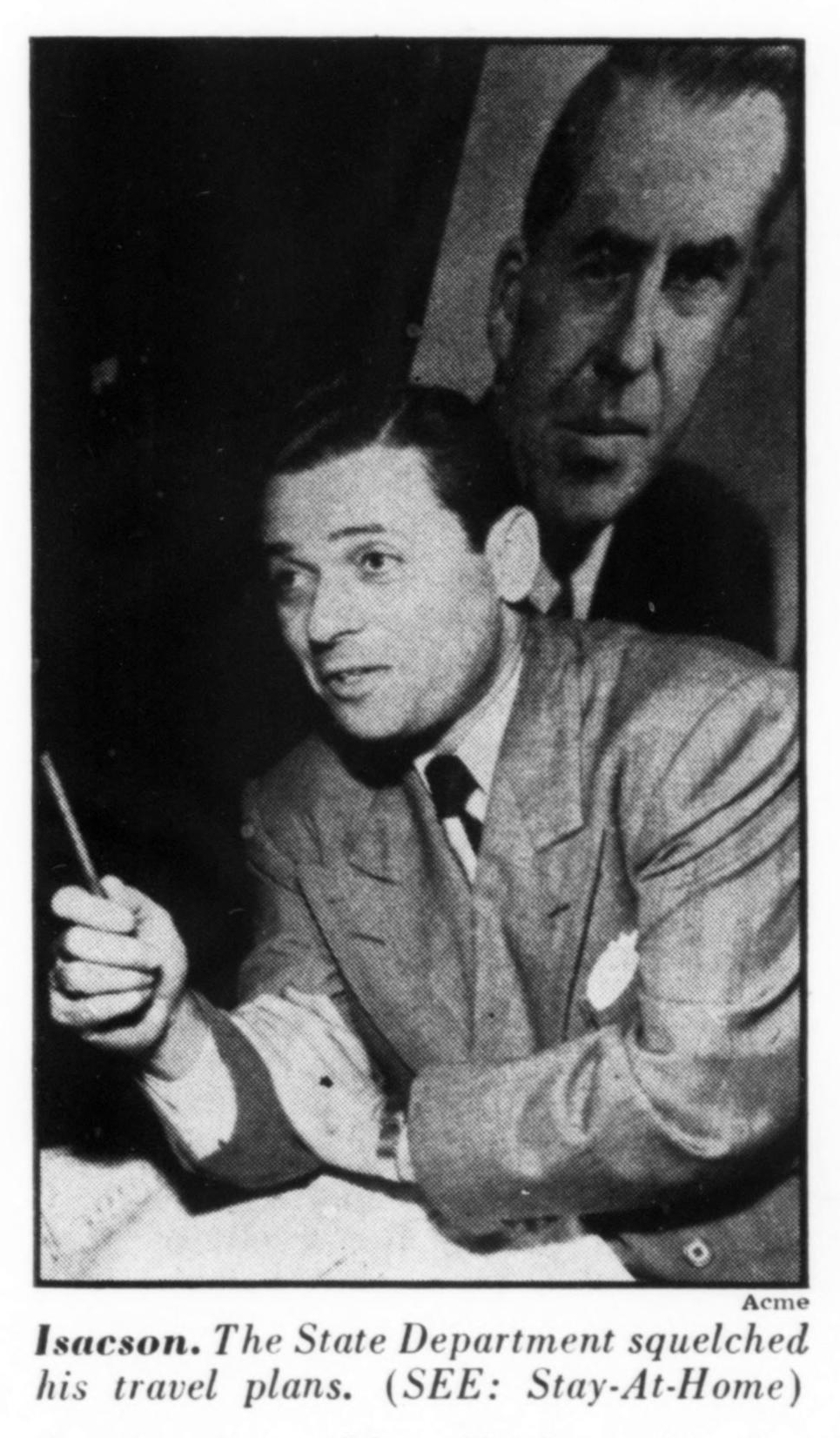
Clipping from Pathfinder magazine, April 21, 1948

In April 1948, he became the first Congressman ever to be denied a United States passport by the State Department when he attempted to go to Paris to attend a conference as an observer for the American Council for a Democratic Greece, a Communist front organization, because of the group's role in opposing the Greek government in the Greek Civil War. Issuing him a passport was judged not to be "in the interests of the US", so he was denied a passport under the Passport Act of 1926 (currently codified at 22 U.S.C. § 211a et seq.), which allows the Presidential administration to deny or revoke passports for foreign policy or national security reasons at any time.

In July 1948, Isacson delivered a high-profile speech at the 1948 Progressive National Convention, in which he criticized the Democrats and Republicans as insufficiently supportive of Israel and accused both major parties of intending to renege on any American support for Israel after the election. Henry A. Wallace's Progressive Party had welcomed Isacson's election.

In September 1948, Isacson stumped for Wallace in New York City with fellow ALP candidates Marcantonio (Harlem), Irma Lindheim (Queens), and Lee Pressman (Brooklyn). "Representative Isacson declared that President Truman would learn during the campaign that he could not hide the responsibility of the Democratic Party for the bi-partisan assault on the liberties of the American people. He declared that the Taft-Hartley Act was passed with the help of a majority of Democratic Representatives, that four out of five Democrats in Congress voted for the peacetime draft and for continuance of the Committee on Un-American Activities."

In the fall of 1948, Isacson ran for a full term against Democrat Isidore Dollinger, who also had the Republican and Liberal endorsements. Neither Isacson nor other ALP candidates received the endorsement of the New England Regional CIO-PAC. Like other contenders, Dollinger lumped Isacson among other ALP leaders (e.g., Marcantonio) as a Communist. (In February 1948, the Russian Communist Party newspaper Pravda hailed Isacson's election as a victory for progressive forces in Europe and America, while Pravda commentator Boris Leontiev predicted worldwide defeat for imperialists.) Isacson lost to Dollinger 44,257 to 74,594.

=== Later career ===
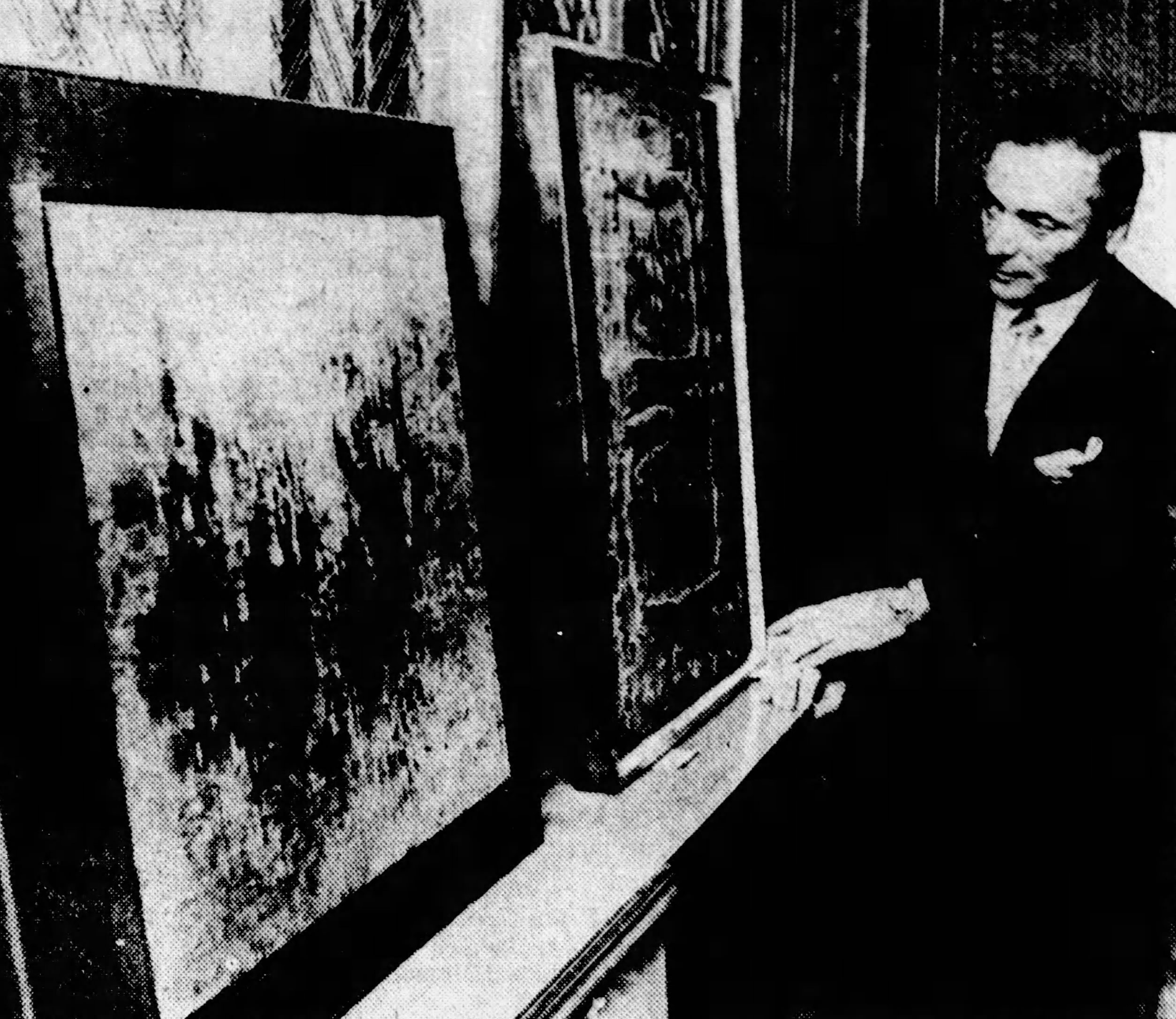
Isacson examines Israeli art at his Eastchester home, October 30, 1966

In 1949 Isacson made a second run for Borough President of the Bronx. As the ALP nominee, he received 16.7% of the vote, coming in third behind the Democratic winner and the Liberal Party candidate.

Isacson returned to his law practice. He lived in Eastchester and became active in the Democratic Party. In 1968, he served as a delegate to the Democratic National Convention pledged to anti-war candidate Eugene McCarthy.

In 1970, he moved to Tamarac, Florida, and taught as an adjunct professor of political science at Nova Southeastern University. He remained active in politics, chairing the Broward County chapter of Concerned Democrats, which opposed President Richard Nixon's "dismantling" of social welfare programs.

== Personal life and death ==
Isacson was Jewish. In 1937, he married Rose Rakowitz (1912–1988). They were the parents of two daughters, Dale and Jill. Jill was murdered in 1981, a crime that was never solved. Rose Rakowitz Isacson died in 1988.

Leo Isacson died of cancer at a hospital in Fort Lauderdale, Florida, on September 21, 1996. He was survived by his second wife, Violet Isacson, whom he married around 1990, and his daughter Dale.

== See also ==
- List of Jewish members of the United States Congress

New York State Assembly
Preceded by Constituency established	New York State Assembly; Bronx County, 13th District; 1945–1946	Succeeded by William J. Drohan
U.S. House of Representatives
Preceded by Benjamin J. Rabin	Member of the U.S. House of Representatives from New York's 24th congressional district 1948–1949	Succeeded by Isidore Dollinger
