= New York's 24th congressional district =

U.S. House district for New York

- Interactive map of district boundaries since January 3, 2025
- Representative: Claudia Tenney; R–Cleveland
- Distribution: 72.81% urban; 27.19% rural
- Population (2025): 771,722
- Median household income: $77,117
- Ethnicity: 87.7% White; 4.2% Two or more races; 4.1% Hispanic; 2.5% Black; 0.7% Asian; 0.7% other
- Cook PVI: R+11

New York's 24th congressional district is located in Upstate New York in the Finger Lakes region, stretching alongside Lake Ontario from near Buffalo in the west to Watertown in the east. The district does not include Rochester, which is in the 25th district. Since 2023, it has been represented by Claudia Tenney. In the 2022 election it voted more strongly Republican than any other district in the state. Prior to the redistricting which took effect in 2023, the district included the city of Syracuse.

The current district includes all or parts of Cayuga, Wayne, Oswego, Ontario, Jefferson, Livingston, Niagara, Genesee, Wyoming, Seneca, Yates, Schuyler, and Orleans counties. With a Cook Partisan Voting Index rating of R+11, it is the most Republican district in New York.

== Recent election results from statewide races ==
Year	Office	Results
2008	President	McCain 53% - 45%
2012	President	Romney 53% - 47%
2016	President	Trump 59% - 34%
2016	Senate	Schumer 53% - 44%
2018	Senate	Farley 55% - 45%
2018	Governor	Molinaro 62% - 31%
2018	Attorney General	Wofford 60% - 36%
2020	President	Trump 59% - 40%
2022	Senate	Pinion 62% - 37%
2022	Governor	Zeldin 67% - 33%
2022	Attorney General	Henry 66% - 34%
2022	Comptroller	Rodríguez 62% - 38%
2024	President	Trump 61% - 38%
2024	Senate	Sapraicone 59% - 41%

== History ==
- 1869–1873: All of Cayuga, Seneca, Wayne counties
- 1919–1945: Parts of Bronx and Westchester counties
- 1945–1971: Parts of Bronx county
- 1971–1973: Parts of Bronx and Westchester counties
- 1973–1983: Parts of Westchester county
- 1983–1993: All of Columbia, Greene, Saratoga, Warren and Washington counties; parts of Dutchess and Rensselaer counties
- 1993–2003: All of Clinton, Franklin, Fulton, Hamilton, Jefferson, Lewis, Oswego and St. Lawrence counties; parts of Essex and Herkimer counties
- 2003–2013: All of Chenango, Cortland, Herkimer and Seneca counties; parts of Broome, Cayuga, Oneida, Ontario, Otsego, Tioga and Tompkins counties
- From 2013 to 2023, the district included all of Cayuga, Onondaga, and Wayne counties, and the western part of Oswego County. Its largest city was Syracuse.
- From 2023 to 2033, the district included all or parts of Cayuga, Wayne, Oswego, Ontario, Jefferson, Livingston, Niagara, Genesee, Wyoming, Seneca, Yates, and Orleans counties.

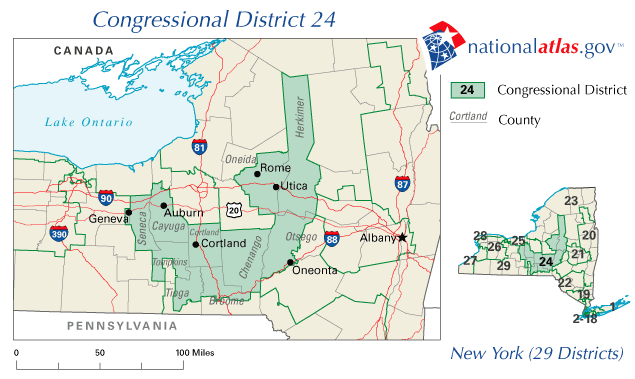
2003–2013

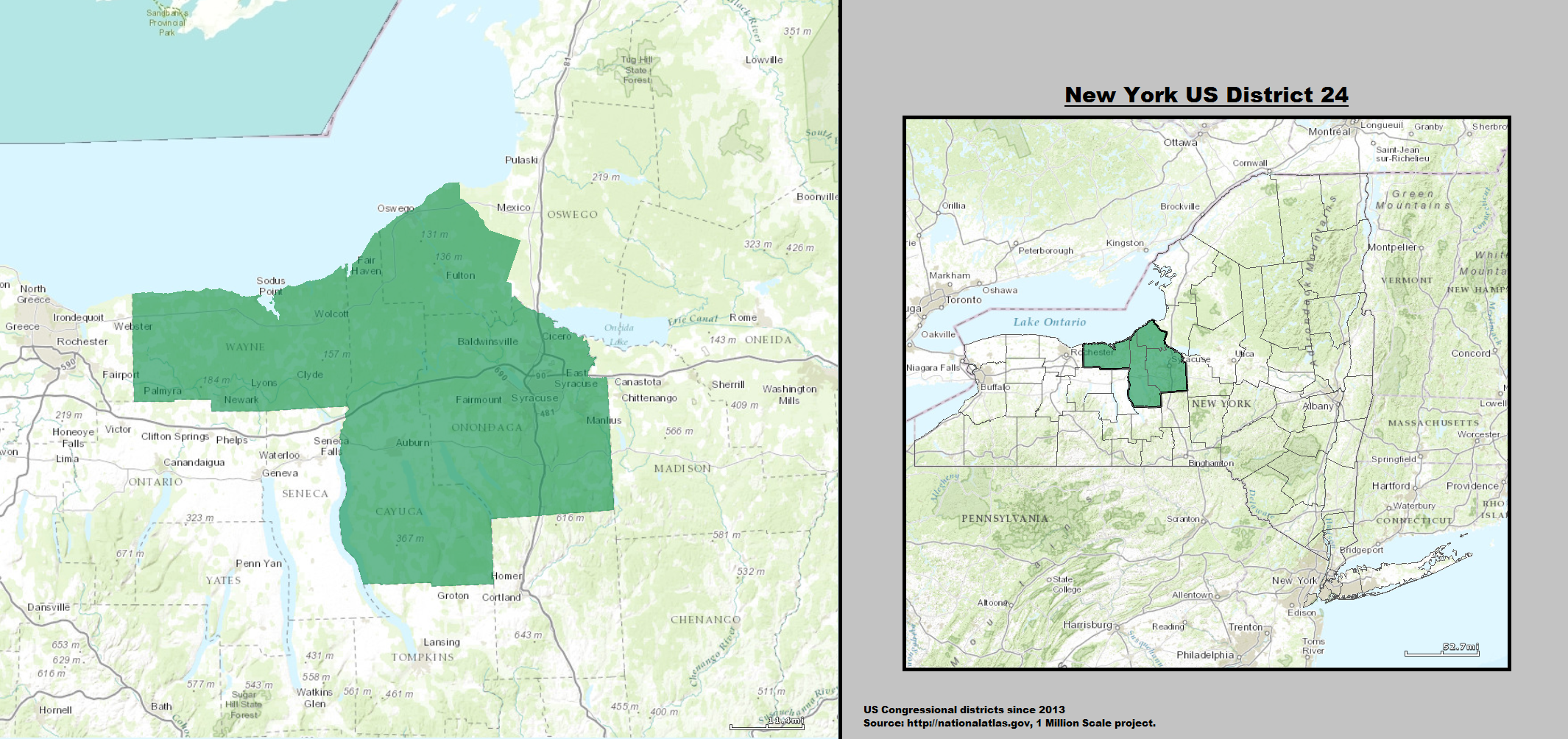
2013–2023

== Counties, towns, and municipalities ==
For the 119th and successive Congresses (based on the districts drawn following the New York Court of Appeals' December 2023 decision in Hoffman v New York State Ind. Redistricting. Commn.), the district contains all or portions of the following counties, towns, and cities.

Cayuga County (10)

Aurelius, Brutus, Cato, Conquest, Mentz, Montezuma, Ira, Sterling, Throop, Victory

Genesee County (14)

All 21 towns and cities

Jefferson County (20)

Adams, Alexandria, Antwerp (part; also 21st), Brownville, Cape Vincent, Champion, Clayton, Ellisburg, Henderson, Hounsfield, Lorraine, Lyme, Orleans, Pamelia, Rodman, Rutland, Theresa, Watertown (city), Watertown (town), Worth

Livingston County (17)

All 17 towns

Niagara County (10)

Cambria, Hartland, Lewiston, Lockport (city) (part; also 23rd), Lockport (town) (part; also 23rd), Newfane, Porter, Royalton, Somerset, Wilson

Ontario County (17)

Bristol, Canadice, Canandaigua (city), Canandaigua (town), East Bloomfield (part; also 25th; includes part of Bloomfield), Farmington, Geneva (city) (shared with Seneca County), Geneva (town), Gorham, Hopewell, Manchester, Naples, Phelps, Richmond, Seneca, South Bristol, West Bloomfield

Oswego County (24)

All 32 towns and cities

Schuyler County (3)

Hector, Reading, Tyrone

Seneca County (10)

All 10 towns

Steuben County (7)

Avoca, Cohocton, Dansville, Prattsburgh, Pulteney, Wayland, Wheeler

Orleans County (10)

All 10 towns

Wayne County (15)

All 15 towns

Wyoming County (16)

All 16 towns

Yates County (9)

All nine towns

== List of members representing the district ==
Representative	Party	Years	Cong ress	Electoral history	District location
District established March 4, 1823
Rowland Day (Sempronius)	Democratic- Republican	March 4, 1823 – March 3, 1825	18th	Elected in 1822. [data missing]	
Charles Kellogg (Kelloggsville)	Jacksonian	March 4, 1825 – March 3, 1827	19th	Elected in 1824. [data missing]	
Nathaniel Garrow (Auburn)	Jacksonian	March 4, 1827 – March 3, 1829	20th	Elected in 1826. [data missing]	
Gershom Powers (Auburn)	Jacksonian	March 4, 1829 – March 3, 1831	21st	Elected in 1828. [data missing]	
Ulysses F. Doubleday (Auburn)	Jacksonian	March 4, 1831 – March 3, 1833	22nd	Elected in 1830. [data missing]	
Rowland Day (Sempronius)	Jacksonian	March 4, 1833 – March 3, 1835	23rd	Elected in 1832 [data missing]	
Ulysses F. Doubleday (Auburn)	Jacksonian	March 4, 1835 – March 3, 1837	24th	Elected in 1834. [data missing]	
William H. Noble (Cato)	Democratic	March 4, 1837 – March 3, 1839	25th	Elected in 1836. [data missing]	
Christopher Morgan (Aurora)	Whig	March 4, 1839 – March 3, 1843	26th 27th	Elected in 1838. Re-elected in 1840. [data missing]	
Horace Wheaton (Pompey)	Democratic	March 4, 1843 – March 3, 1847	28th 29th	Elected in 1842. Re-elected in 1844. [data missing]	
Daniel Gott (Pompey)	Whig	March 4, 1847 – March 3, 1851	30th 31st	Elected in 1846. Re-elected in 1848. [data missing]	
Daniel T. Jones (Baldwinsville)	Democratic	March 4, 1851 – March 3, 1855	32nd 33rd	Elected in 1850. Re-elected in 1852. [data missing]	
Amos P. Granger (Syracuse)	Whig	March 4, 1855 – March 3, 1857	34th 35th	Elected in 1854. Re-elected in 1856. Retired	
Amos P. Granger (Syracuse)	Republican	March 4, 1857 – March 3, 1859	34th 35th	Elected in 1854. Re-elected in 1856. Retired	
Charles B. Sedgwick (Syracuse)	Republican	March 4, 1859 – March 3, 1863	36th 37th	Re-elected in 1858. Re-elected in 1860. [data missing]	
Theodore M. Pomeroy (Auburn)	Republican	March 4, 1863 – March 3, 1869	38th 39th 40th	Redistricted from the 25th district and re-elected in 1862. Re-elected in 1864. Re-elected in 1866. [data missing]	
George W. Cowles (Clyde)	Republican	March 4, 1869 – March 3, 1871	41st	Elected in 1868. [data missing]	
John E. Seeley (Ovid)	Republican	March 4, 1871 – March 3, 1873	42nd	Elected in 1870. [data missing]	
R. Holland Duell (Cortland)	Republican	March 4, 1873 – March 3, 1875	43rd	Redistricted from the 23rd district and re-elected in 1872. [data missing]	
William H. Baker (Constantia)	Republican	March 4, 1875 – March 3, 1879	44th 45th	Elected in 1874. Re-elected in 1876. [data missing]	
Joseph Mason (Hamilton)	Republican	March 4, 1879 – March 3, 1883	46th 47th	Elected in 1878. Re-elected in 1880. [data missing]	
Newton W. Nutting (Oswego)	Republican	March 4, 1883 – March 3, 1885	48th	Elected in 1882. [data missing]	
John S. Pindar (Cobleskill)	Democratic	March 4, 1885 – March 3, 1887	49th	Elected in 1884. [data missing]	
David Wilber (Oneonta)	Republican	March 4, 1887 – April 1, 1890	50th 51st	Elected in 1886. Re-elected in 1888. Died.	
Vacant		April 1, 1890 – November 4, 1890	51st		
John S. Pindar (Cobleskill)	Democratic	November 4, 1890 – March 3, 1891	51st	Elected to finish Wilber's term. [data missing]	
George Van Horn (Cooperstown)	Democratic	March 4, 1891 – March 3, 1893	52nd	Elected in 1890. [data missing]	
Charles A. Chickering (Copenhagen)	Republican	March 4, 1893 – February 13, 1900	53rd 54th 55th 56th	Elected in 1892. Re-elected in 1894. Re-elected in 1896. Re-elected in 1898. Died.	
Vacant		February 13, 1900 – November 6, 1900	56th		
Albert D. Shaw (Watertown)	Republican	November 6, 1900 – February 10, 1901	56th	Elected to finish Chickering's term. Re-elected in 1900. Died.	
Vacant		February 10, 1901 – November 5, 1901	56th 57th		
Charles L. Knapp (Lowville)	Republican	November 5, 1901 – March 3, 1903	57th	Elected to finish Shaw's term. Redistricted to the 28th district.	
George J. Smith (Kingston)	Republican	March 4, 1903 – March 3, 1905	58th	Elected in 1902. [data missing]	
Frank J. LeFevre (New Paltz)	Republican	March 4, 1905 – March 3, 1907	59th	Elected in 1904. [data missing]	
George W. Fairchild (Oneonta)	Republican	March 4, 1907 – March 3, 1913	60th 61st 62nd	Elected in 1906. Re-elected in 1908. Re-elected in 1910. Redistricted to the 34th district.	
Woodson R. Oglesby (Yonkers)	Democratic	March 4, 1913 – March 3, 1917	63rd 64th	Elected in 1912. Re-elected in 1914. [data missing]	
Benjamin L. Fairchild (Pelham)	Republican	March 4, 1917 – March 3, 1919	65th	Elected in 1916. Lost re-election.	
James V. Ganly (New York)	Democratic	March 4, 1919 – March 3, 1921	66th	Elected in 1918. Lost re-election.	
Benjamin L. Fairchild (Pelham)	Republican	March 4, 1921 – March 3, 1923	67th	Elected in 1920. Lost re-election.	
James V. Ganly (The Bronx)	Democratic	March 4, 1923 – September 7, 1923	68th	Elected in 1922. Died.	
Vacant		September 7, 1923 – November 6, 1923	68th		
Benjamin L. Fairchild (Pelham)	Republican	November 6, 1923 – March 3, 1927	68th 69th	Elected to finish Ganly's term. Re-elected in 1924. Lost re-election.	
James M. Fitzpatrick (New York)	Democratic	March 4, 1927 – January 3, 1945	70th 71st 72nd 73rd 74th 75th 76th 77th 78th	Elected in 1926. Re-elected in 1928. Re-elected in 1930. Re-elected in 1932. Re-elected in 1934. Re-elected in 1936. Re-elected in 1938. Re-elected in 1940. Re-elected in 1942. [data missing]	
Benjamin J. Rabin (New York)	Democratic	January 3, 1945 – December 31, 1947	79th 80th	Elected in 1944. Re-elected in 1946. Resigned after being elected justice of New York Supreme Court.	
Vacant		January 1, 1948 – February 16, 1948	80th		
Leo Isacson (New York)	American; Labor	February 17, 1948 – January 3, 1949	80th	Elected to finish Rabin's term. Lost re-election.	
Isidore Dollinger (New York)	Democratic	January 3, 1949 – January 3, 1953	81st 82nd	Elected in 1948. Re-elected in 1950. Redistricted to the 23rd district.	
Charles A. Buckley (New York)	Democratic	January 3, 1953 – January 3, 1963	83rd 84th 85th 86th 87th	Redistricted from the 25th district and re-elected in 1952. Re-elected in 1954. Re-elected in 1956. Re-elected in 1958. Re-elected in 1960. Redistricted to the 23rd district.	
Paul A. Fino (The Bronx)	Republican	January 3, 1963 – December 31, 1968	88th 89th 90th	Redistricted from the 25th district and re-elected in 1962. Re-elected in 1964. Re-elected in 1966. Resigned after being elected justice of New York Supreme Court.	
Vacant		January 1, 1969 – January 3, 1969	90th		
Mario Biaggi (The Bronx)	Democratic	January 3, 1969 – January 3, 1973	91st 92nd	Elected in 1968. Re-elected in 1970. Redistricted to the 10th district.	
Ogden Reid (Purchase)	Democratic	January 3, 1973 – January 3, 1975	93rd	Redistricted from the 26th district and re-elected in 1972. [data missing]	
Richard Ottinger (Mamaroneck)	Democratic	January 3, 1975 – January 3, 1983	94th 95th 96th 97th	Elected in 1974. Re-elected in 1976. Re-elected in 1978. Re-elected in 1980. Redistricted to the 20th district.	
Gerald Solomon (Glens Falls)	Republican	January 3, 1983 – January 3, 1993	98th 99th 100th 101st 102nd	Redistricted from the 29th district and re-elected in 1982. Re-elected in 1984. Re-elected in 1986. Re-elected in 1988. Re-elected in 1990. Redistricted to the 22nd district.	
John M. McHugh (Pierrepont Manor)	Republican	January 3, 1993 – January 3, 2003	103rd 104th 105th 106th 107th	Elected in 1992. Re-elected in 1994. Re-elected in 1996. Re-elected in 1998. Re-elected in 2000. Redistricted to the 23rd district.	
Sherwood Boehlert (New Hartford)	Republican	January 3, 2003 – January 3, 2007	108th 109th	Redistricted from the 23rd district and re-elected in 2002. Re-elected in 2004. Retired.`	2003–2013
Mike Arcuri (Utica)	Democratic	January 3, 2007 – January 3, 2011	110th 111th	Elected in 2006. Re-elected in 2008. Lost re-election.	2003–2013
Richard Hanna (Barneveld)	Republican	January 3, 2011 – January 3, 2013	112th	Elected in 2010. Redistricted to the 22nd district.	2003–2013
Dan Maffei (Syracuse)	Democratic	January 3, 2013 – January 3, 2015	113th	elected in 2012. Lost re-election.	2013–2023
John Katko (Syracuse)	Republican	January 3, 2015 – January 3, 2023	114th 115th 116th 117th	Elected in 2014. Re-elected in 2016. Re-elected in 2018. Re-elected in 2020. Redistricted to the 22nd district and retired.	2013–2023
Claudia Tenney (Cleveland)	Republican	January 3, 2023 – present	118th 119th	Redistricted from the 22nd district and re-elected in 2022. Re-elected in 2024. Re-elected in 2026.	2023–2025
Claudia Tenney (Cleveland)	Republican	January 3, 2023 – present	118th 119th	Redistricted from the 22nd district and re-elected in 2022. Re-elected in 2024. Re-elected in 2026.	2025–present

== Election results ==
1984 United States House of Representatives elections in New York: 24th district
Party	Candidate	Votes	%	±%
Republican	Gerald B.H. Solomon (incumbent)	164,019	73.2	
Democratic	Edward James Bloch	60,188	26.8	
Majority		103,831	46.8	
Turnout		224,207	100	

1996 United States House of Representatives elections in New York: 24th district
Party	Candidate	Votes	%	±%
Republican	John M. McHugh (incumbent)	124,240	71.1	
Democratic	Donald Ravenscroft	43,692	25.0	
Independence	William H. Beaumont	6,750	3.9	
Majority		80,548	46.1	
Turnout		174,682	100	

1998 United States House of Representatives elections in New York: 24th district
Party	Candidate	Votes	%	±%
Republican	John M. McHugh (incumbent)	116,682	79.0	+7.9
Democratic	Neil P. Tallon	31,011	21.0	−4.0
Majority		85,671	58.0	+11.9
Turnout		147,693	100	−15.5

2000 United States House of Representatives elections in New York: 24th district
Party	Candidate	Votes	%	±%
Republican	John M. McHugh (incumbent)	138,322	74.3	−4.7
Democratic	Neil P. Tallon	42,698	22.9	+1.9
Independence	Willard E. Smith	5,167	2.8	+2.8
Majority		95,624	51.4	−6.6
Turnout		186,187	100	+26.1

2002 United States House of Representatives elections in New York: 24th district
Party	Candidate	Votes	%	±%
Republican	Sherwood Boehlert	108,017	70.7	−3.6
Conservative	David L. Walrath	32,991	21.6	+21.6
Green	Mark Dunau	6,660	4.4	+4.4
Right to Life	Kathleen M. Peters	5,109	3.3	+3.3
Majority		75,026	49.1	−2.3
Turnout		152,777	100	−17.9

2004 United States House of Representatives elections in New York: 24th district
Party	Candidate	Votes	%	±%
Republican	Sherwood Boehlert (incumbent)	143,000	56.9	−13.8
Democratic	Jeff A. Miller	85,140	33.9	+33.9
Conservative	David L. Walrath	23,228	9.2	−12.4
Majority		57,860	23.0	−26.1
Turnout		251,368	100	+64.5

In 2008, Michael Arcuri won the election with 130,799 votes (9,454 from Working Families Party line) to Richard L. Hanna's 120,880 out of 282,114 total votes. Note that in New York State electoral politics there are several minor parties at various points on the political spectrum. Certain parties will invariably endorse either the Republican or Democratic candidate for every office, hence the state electoral results contain both the party votes, and the final candidate votes (Listed as "Recap").

2006 United States House of Representatives elections in New York: 24th district
Party	Candidate	Votes	%	±%
Democratic	Michael Arcuri	109,686	53.9	+20.0
Republican	Raymond Meier	91,504	45.0	−11.9
Libertarian	Mike Sylvia	2,134	1.0	+1.0
Majority		18,182	8.9	−14.1
Turnout		203,324	100	−19.1

2010 United States House of Representatives elections in New York: 24th district
Party	Candidate	Votes	%	±%
Republican	Richard L. Hanna	96,686	52.9%	
Democratic	Michael Arcuri (incumbent)	86,037	47.1%	
Turnout		182,723	100	

2012 United States House of Representatives elections in New York: 24th district
Party	Candidate	Votes	%	±%
Democratic	Dan Maffei	131,242	48.7	−1.1
Republican	Ann Marie Buerkle	116,641	43.3	−6.9
Green	Ursula Rozum	21,413	8.0	+8.0
Majority		14,601	5.4	+5.0
Turnout		269,296	100	+29.4

2014 United States House of Representatives elections in New York: 24th district
Party	Candidate	Votes	%	±%
Republican	John Katko	112,469	59.9	+16.6
Democratic	Dan Maffei (incumbent)	75,286	40.1	−8.6
Majority		37,183	19.8	+14.4
Turnout		187,755	100	−30.2

2016 United States House of Representatives elections in New York: 24th district
Party	Candidate	Votes	%	±%
Republican	John Katko (incumbent)	170,532	61.0	+1.1
Democratic	Colleen Deacon	108,928	39.0	−1.1
Majority		61,604	22.0	+2.2
Turnout		279,460	100	+48.8

2018 United States House of Representatives elections in New York: 24th district
Party	Candidate	Votes	%	±%
Republican	John Katko (incumbent)	136,920	52.6	−8.4
Democratic	Dana Balter	123,226	47.4	+8.4
Majority		13,694	5.2	−16.8
Turnout		260,146	100	−6.9

2020 United States House of Representatives elections in New York: 24th district
Party	Candidate	Votes	%
Republican	John Katko	156,025	45.4
Conservative	John Katko	21,062	6.1
Independence	John Katko	5,480	1.6
Total	John Katko (incumbent)	182,567	53.1
Democratic	Dana Balter	147,638	43.0
Working Families	Steven Williams	13,232	3.9
Total votes		343,437	100.0
Republican hold			

2024 United States House of Representatives elections in New York: 24th district
Party	Candidate	Votes	%
Republican	Claudia Tenney	207,078	57.7
Conservative	Claudia Tenney	28,789	8.0
Total	Claudia Tenney (incumbent)	235,867	65.7
Democratic	David Wagenhauser	123,317	34.3
Total votes		359,184	100.0
Republican hold			

== See also ==
- List of United States congressional districts
- New York's congressional delegations
- New York's congressional districts

U.S. House of Representatives
Preceded by Indiana's 9th congressional district	Home district of the speaker of the House; March 3, 1869 – March 4, 1869	Succeeded by Maine's 3rd congressional district
