= R. Holland Duell =

American politician

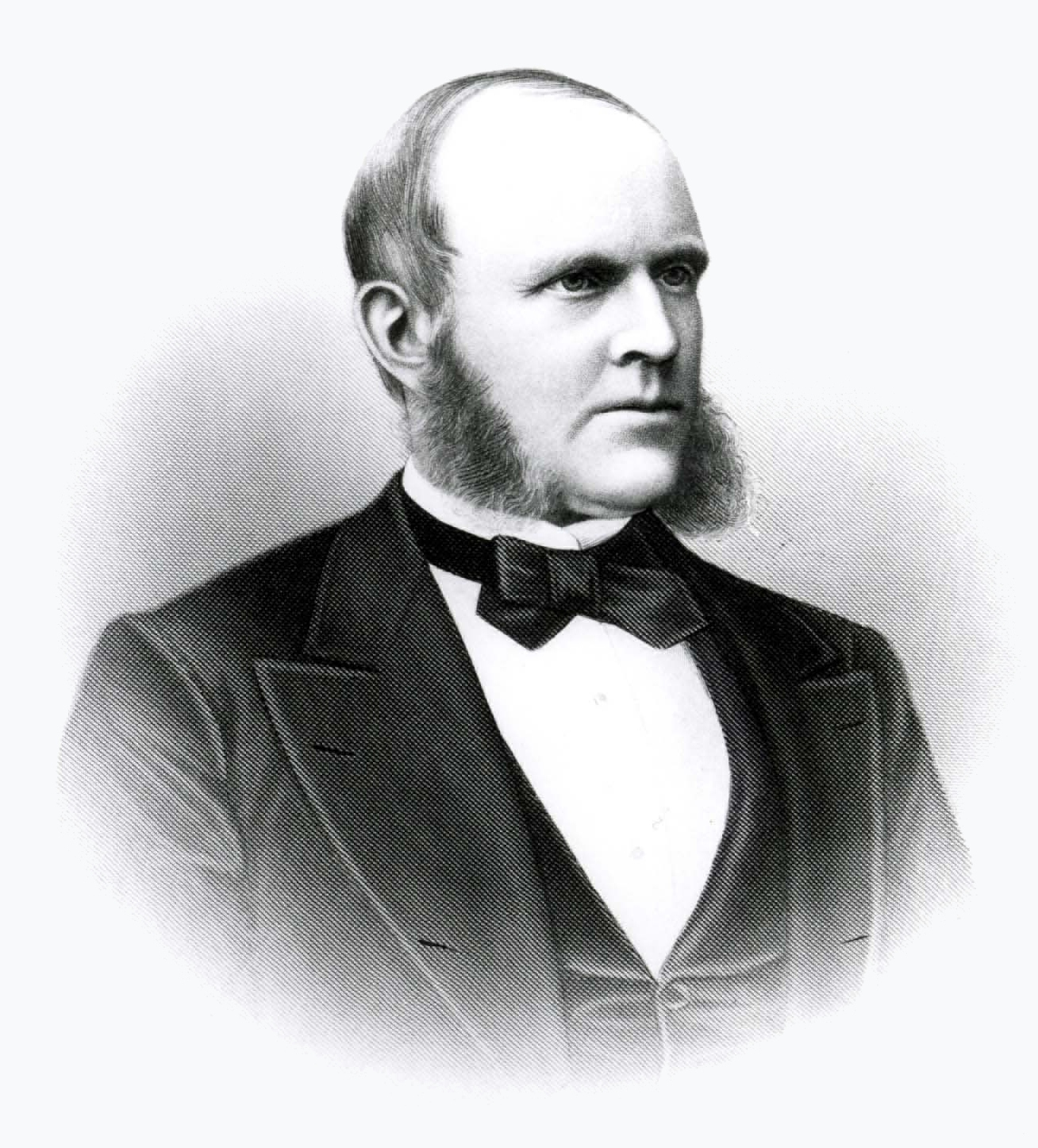

United States Commissioner of Patents
- In office October 1, 1875 – January 30, 1877
- Preceded by: John M. Thacher
- Succeeded by: Ellis Spear

Chairman of the U.S. House Committee on Expenditures on Public Buildings
- In office March 4, 1873 – March 3, 1875
- Preceded by: John B. Hawley
- Succeeded by: Henry B. Metcalfe

Chairman of the U.S. House Committee on Revolutionary Claims
- In office March 4, 1861 – March 3, 1863
- Preceded by: George N. Briggs
- Succeeded by: Hiram Price

Member of the U.S. House of Representatives from New York
- In office March 4, 1871 – March 3, 1875
- Preceded by: Dennis McCarthy
- Succeeded by: William H. Baker
- Constituency: 23rd district (1871–73); 24th district (1873–75)
- In office March 4, 1859 – March 3, 1863
- Preceded by: Henry Bennett
- Succeeded by: Francis Kernan
- Constituency: 21st district

Judge of Cortland County, New York
- In office 1855–1859
- Preceded by: Lewis Kingsley
- Succeeded by: Stephen Brewer

District Attorney of Cortland County, New York
- In office 1850–1855
- Preceded by: Augustus L. Ballard
- Succeeded by: Edward C. Reed

Personal details
- Born: December 20, 1824 Warren, New York, U.S.
- Died: February 11, 1891 (aged 66) Cortland, New York, U.S.
- Resting place: Cortland Rural Cemetery
- Party: Republican
- Spouse(s): Mary L. Cuyler (m. 1846); Mary H. Greene (m. 1888)
- Children: 4 (including Charles Holland Duell)
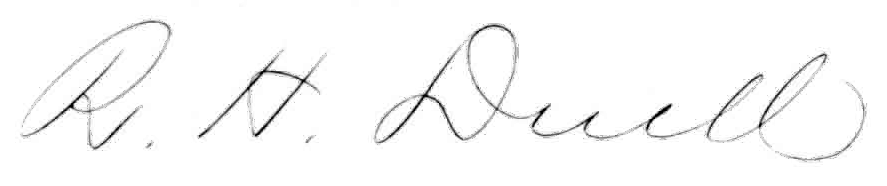
- Signature

Rodolphus (sometimes Robert) Holland Duell (December 20, 1824 – February 11, 1891) was an American lawyer and politician from New York. He was elected to Congress and became United States Commissioner of Patents.

== Early life ==
Duell was born in Warren, Herkimer County, New York on December 20, 1824, a son of Joseph Duell and Phoebe (Potter) Duell. He completed preparatory studies and subsequently studied law, first with Daniel Gott and later with Charles B. Sedgwick. He was admitted to the bar in 1845 and commenced practice in Fabius.

=== Family ===
In 1846, Duell married Mary Ledyard Cuyler (1822–1884). They were the parents of four children: Louise C., Charles H., Kate L., and Richard C. In December 1888, he married Mary H. Greene.

== Career ==
Originally a Whig, he joined the Republican Party when it was formed in the mid-1850s. Duell moved to Cortland in 1847, and was district attorney of Cortland County from 1850 to 1855. He was Judge of Cortland County from 1855 to 1859. He was a delegate to the 1856 Republican National Convention, as well as the 1864 convention and the one in 1868.

Duell was elected as a Republican to the 36th and 37th United States Congresses, holding office from March 4, 1859, to March 3, 1863; during the 37th Congress, he was Chairman of the Committee on Revolutionary Claims. He resumed the practice of law in Cortland and was Assessor of Internal Revenue for the 23rd District of New York from 1869 to 1871.

He was elected to the 42nd and 43rd United States Congresses, holding office from March 4, 1871, to March 3, 1875. During the 43rd Congress he was Chairman of the Committee on Expenditures on Public Buildings. Duell was appointed as United States Commissioner of Patents by President Ulysses S. Grant on October 1, 1875, and remained in office until January 30, 1877. He resumed the practice of law in Cortland and New York City. He died in Cortland on February 11, 1891; interment was in Cortland Rural Cemetery.

U.S. House of Representatives
Preceded by Henry Bennett	Member of the U.S. House of Representatives from New York's 21st congressional district 1859–1863	Succeeded by Francis Kernan
Preceded by Dennis McCarthy	Member of the U.S. House of Representatives from New York's 23rd congressional district 1871–1873	Succeeded by William E. Lansing
Preceded by John E. Seeley	Member of the U.S. House of Representatives from New York's 24th congressional district 1873–1875	Succeeded by William H. Baker
