= William H. Baker =

American politician

William Henry Baker
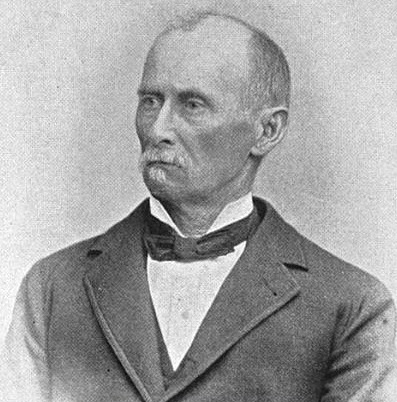
- Baker as a delegate to the 1894 New York Constitutional Convention

Member of the U.S. House of Representatives from New York's 24th district
- In office March 4, 1875 – March 3, 1879
- Preceded by: R. Holland Duell
- Succeeded by: Joseph Mason

Personal details
- Born: January 17, 1827 Lenox, New York, United States
- Died: November 25, 1911 (aged 84) Constantia, New York
- Party: Republican
- Education: Red Creek Academy; Mexico Academy
- Profession: lawyer; politician; farmer

William Henry Baker (January 17, 1827 – November 25, 1911) was an American politician and a U.S. representative from New York.

== Biography ==
Born in Lenox, New York, Baker moved with his parents to Oswego County in 1829 and attended the common schools, then Red Creek and Mexico Academies. He studied law and was admitted to the bar in Syracuse, New York, in November 1851 and commenced practice in Cleveland, New York.

== Career ==
Baker moved to Constantia, New York, in 1853, and served as district attorney for Oswego County from January 1863 to January 1870.

Elected as a Republican to the Forty-fourth and Forty-fifth Congresses, Baker served as U.S. Representative for the twenty-fourth district of New York from March 4, 1875, to March 3, 1879.

Declining to be a candidate for renomination in 1878, Baker resumed his practice and was a delegate to the State constitutional conventions in 1884 and 1894. He also engaged in agricultural pursuits.

== Death ==
Baker died in Constantia, New York, on November 25, 1911 (age 84 years, 312 days). He is interred at Trinity Church Cemetery.

U.S. House of Representatives
Preceded by R. Holland Duell	Member of the U.S. House of Representatives from New York's 24th congressional district 1875–1879	Succeeded by Joseph Mason
