= Ferris Jacobs Jr. =

American military officer (1836–1886)

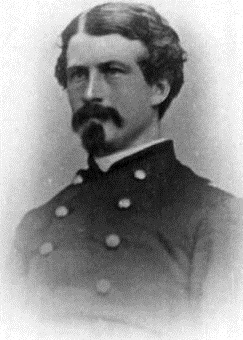

Member of the U.S. House of Representatives from New York's 21st district
- In office March 4, 1881 – March 3, 1883
- Preceded by: David Wilber
- Succeeded by: George W. Ray

Personal details
- Born: March 20, 1836 Delhi, New York, US
- Died: August 30, 1886 (aged 50) White Plains, New York, US
- Party: Republican

Ferris Jacobs Jr. (March 20, 1836 – August 30, 1886) was an American military officer, politician, and lawyer. He served in the Union Army in several roles during the American Civil War, and afterwards spent one term as United States representative from New York.

== Biography ==
Jacobs was born in Delhi, Delaware County, New York, and attended Delaware Academy and Delaware Literary Institute. He graduated from Williams College in 1856; studied law and was admitted to the bar in 1859 and commenced practice in Delhi. During the American Civil War he served in the Union Army as a commissioned captain in the 3rd New York Cavalry as lieutenant colonel of the 26th New York Cavalry. He also served as brevetted brigadier general of Volunteers. Later he resumed law practice in Delhi, New York and was elected district attorney in 1865 and 1866. He delegated at the Republican National Convention in 1880, and was elected as a Republican in the Forty-seventh Congress (March 4, 1881 – March 3, 1883). He was not a candidate for renomination in 1882, so resumed the practice of law. He died in White Plains, New York, interment in Woodland Cemetery, Delhi, New York.

U.S. House of Representatives
Preceded by David Wilber	Member of the U.S. House of Representatives from New York's 21st congressional district 1881–1883	Succeeded by George W. Ray
