= Charles L. Knapp =

American politician (1847–1929)

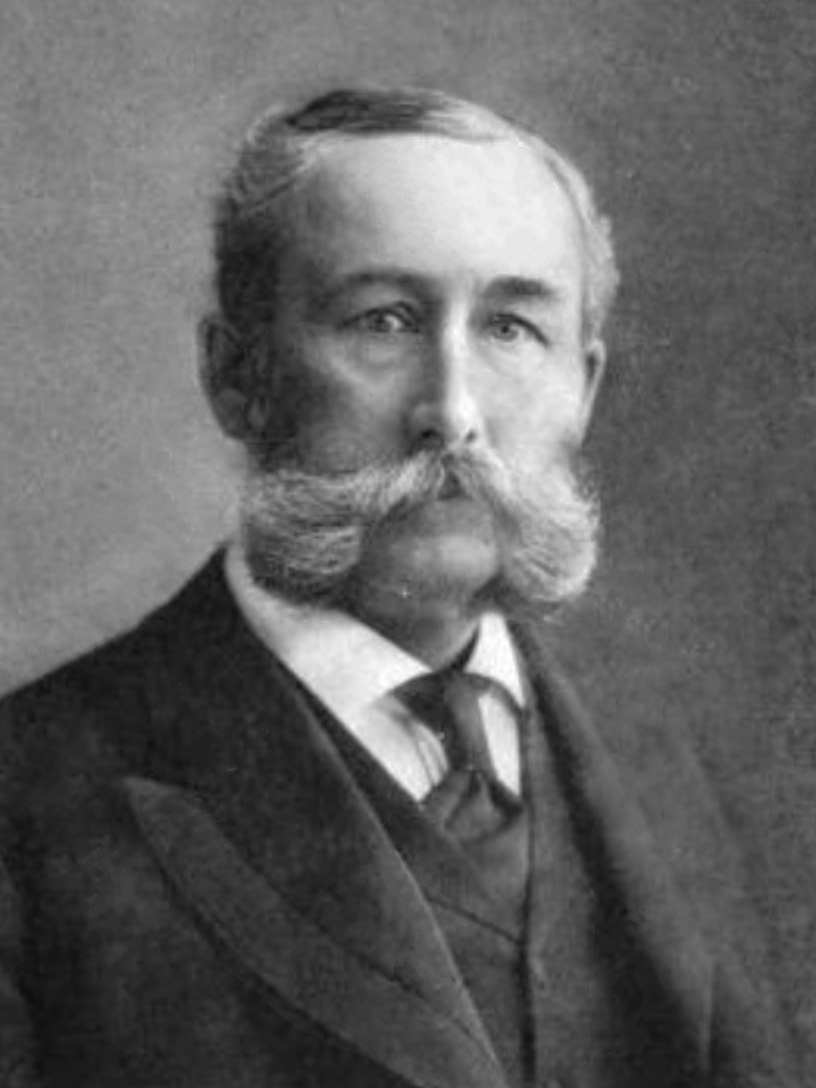

Member of the U.S. House of Representatives from New York
- In office November 5, 1901 – March 3, 1911
- Preceded by: Albert D. Shaw (24th); Sereno E. Payne (28th)
- Succeeded by: George J. Smith (24th); Luther W. Mott (28th)
- Constituency: 24th district (1901-03); 28th district (1903-11)

Member of the New York State Senate from the 20th district
- In office January 1, 1886 – December 31, 1887
- Preceded by: John I. Gilbert
- Succeeded by: George Z. Erwin

Personal details
- Born: Charles Luman Knapp; July 4, 1847 near Harrisburg, New York, U.S.
- Died: January 3, 1929 (aged 81) Lowville, New York, U.S.
- Resting place: Lowville Rural Cemetery, Lowville, New York, U.S.
- Party: Republican
- Spouse: Sarah Dorrance
- Parent(s): Charles Martin Knapp; Alzada Shull
- Education: Rutgers College
- Profession: Politician, lawyer

Charles Luman Knapp (July 4, 1847 – January 3, 1929) was an American politician from New York.

== Life ==
Born on a farm near Harrisburg, New York, Knapp attended the rural schools; Lowville (New York) Academy; and Irving Institute in Tarrytown, New York. He graduated from Rutgers College in 1869. Then he studied law, was admitted to the bar in 1873, and practiced in Lowville.

He was a member of the New York State Senate in 1886 and 1887. He was appointed by President Benjamin Harrison as consul general at Montreal in 1889, and remained on the post until September 1893, when he returned to Lowville and resumed the practice of law. He also engaged in banking.

Knapp was elected as a Republican to the 57th Congress to fill the vacancy caused by the death of Albert D. Shaw, and was re-elected to the 58th, 59th, 60th and 61st United States Congresses, holding office from November 5, 1901, to March 3, 1911. He was Chairman of the House Committee on Elections No. 1 (61st Congress).

He resumed the practice of law in Lowville, died there on January 3, 1929, and was buried at the Lowville Rural Cemetery.

== Sources ==
- United States Congress. "Charles L. Knapp (id: K000279)". Biographical Directory of the United States Congress.

New York State Senate
Preceded by John I. Gilbert	New York State Senate; 20th District; 1886–1887	Succeeded by George Z. Erwin
U.S. House of Representatives
Preceded by Albert D. Shaw	Member of the U.S. House of Representatives from New York's 24th congressional district 1901–1903	Succeeded by George J. Smith
Preceded by Sereno E. Payne	Member of the U.S. House of Representatives from New York's 28th congressional district 1903–1911	Succeeded by Luther W. Mott
