= James M. Fitzpatrick =

American politician

James Martin Fitzpatrick
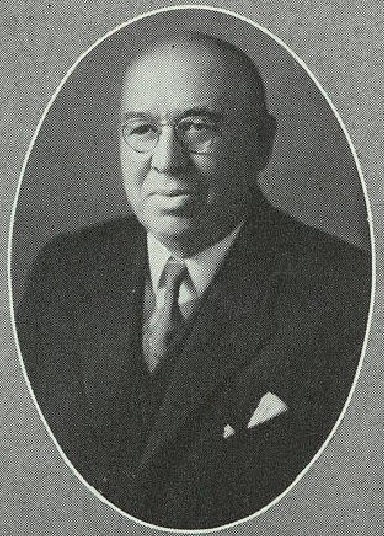

Member of the U.S. House of Representatives from New York's 24th district
- In office March 4, 1927 – January 3, 1945
- Preceded by: Benjamin L. Fairchild
- Succeeded by: Benjamin J. Rabin

Personal details
- Born: June 27, 1869 West Stockbridge, Massachusetts
- Died: April 10, 1949 (aged 79) New York City
- Party: Democratic Party

James Martin Fitzpatrick (June 27, 1869 – April 10, 1949) of the Bronx was a Democratic U.S. representative from New York from 1927 to 1945.

== Biography ==
James Martin Fitzpatrick was born in West Stockbridge, Massachusetts on June 27, 1869. He attended school in Massachusetts and worked in the cotton mills and iron ore mines of West Stockbridge.

=== Early career ===
In 1891 he moved to The Bronx, where he was employed by the Metropolitan Street Railroad Company and the Interborough Rapid Transit Company until 1925, when he became involved in the real estate business as a partner in the firm Fitzpatrick & Domph.

Fitzpatrick served as a Commissioner of Street Openings and Improvements for the Bronx in 1919, and a member of the New York City Board of Aldermen from 1919 to 1927.

=== Congress ===
In 1926 he was elected to Congress and served nine terms, March 4, 1927, to January 3, 1945.

=== Later career and death ===
Fitzpatrick did not run for reelection in 1944 and retired to New York City. He died there on April 10, 1949, and was buried in Saint Raymond's Cemetery.

U.S. House of Representatives
Preceded by Benjamin L. Fairchild	Member of the U.S. House of Representatives from New York's 24th congressional district 1927–1945	Succeeded by Benjamin J. Rabin
