= Joseph Mason (New York politician) =

American politician

Member of the U.S. House of Representatives from New York's 24th district
- In office March 4, 1879 – March 3, 1883
- Preceded by: William H. Baker
- Succeeded by: Newton W. Nutting

Personal details
- Born: March 30, 1828 Plattsburgh, New York, U.S.
- Died: May 31, 1914 (aged 86) Hamilton, New York, U.S.
- Party: Republican
- Relatives: Charles Mason (brother)

Joseph Mason (March 30, 1828 – May 31, 1914) was a U.S. representative from New York.

Born in Plattsburgh, New York, Mason moved with his parents to Hamilton, New York in 1840. He attended Hamilton Academy and Madison College (later Colgate University). Mason studied law with his brother Charles Mason, was admitted to the bar in 1849, and practiced in Hamilton.

Mason was elected Justice of the Peace in 1849 and served until 1904.

In 1863 he elected county judge and surrogate judge of Madison County and served from January 1, 1864 to December 31, 1867.

From 1871 to 1876 he served as federal collector of internal revenue for the district that included Hamilton.

He served as city attorney for many years.

Mason was elected as a Republican to the Forty-sixth and Forty-seventh Congresses (March 4, 1879 – March 3, 1883). His first election was contested by his Democratic opponent, Sebastian Duffy, but the contest was resolved in Mason's favor. Mason was not a candidate for renomination in 1882, and resumed the practice of law in Hamilton.

He died in Hamilton on May 31, 1914, and was interred at Woodlawn Cemetery in Hamilton.

== Sources ==
- United States Congress. "Joseph Mason (id: M000222)". Biographical Directory of the United States Congress.

U.S. House of Representatives
Preceded by William H. Baker	Member of the U.S. House of Representatives from New York's 24th congressional district March 4, 1879 – March 3, 1883	Succeeded by Newton W. Nutting
