= Newton W. Nutting =

American politician

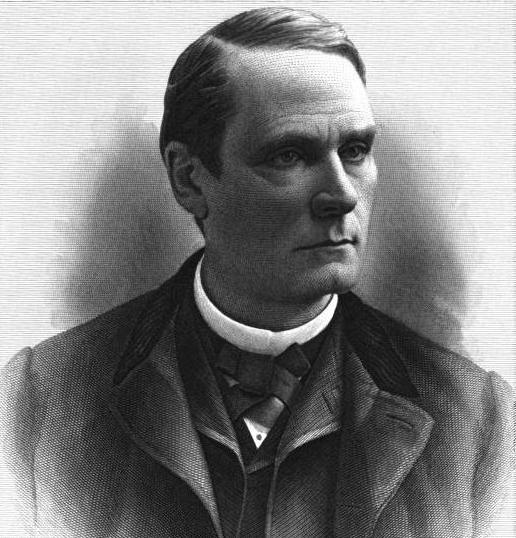
- Headshot from Memorial Addresses on the Life and Character of Newton W. Nutting

Member of the U.S. House of Representatives from New York's 24th district
- In office March 4, 1883 – March 3, 1885
- Preceded by: Joseph Mason
- Succeeded by: John S. Pindar

Member of the U.S. House of Representatives from New York's 27th district
- In office March 4, 1887 – October 15, 1889
- Preceded by: Sereno E. Payne
- Succeeded by: Sereno E. Payne

Personal details
- Born: October 22, 1840 West Monroe, New York, U.S.
- Died: October 15, 1889 (aged 48) Oswego, New York, U.S.
- Resting place: Riverside Cemetery
- Party: Republican

Newton Wright Nutting (October 22, 1840 – October 15, 1889) was a U.S. representative from New York.

Nutting was born in 1840 in West Monroe, New York. He pursued an academic course, studying law and was admitted to the bar. He commenced the practice of law in Oswego, New York.

From January 1, 1864, until January 1, 1867, Nutting served as member of the Oswego County school committee. He subsequently served as the Oswego County district attorney from January 1, 1869, until January 1, 1872.

Nutting later served as an Oswego County Judge, serving from January 1, 1878, until March 4, 1883, when he resigned to take a seat in Congress.

In 1882, Nutting was elected as a Republican to the 48th Congress and served from March 4, 1883, until March 3, 1885. He was defeated for re-election in 1884 by John S. Pindar.

Following his defeat, Nutting resumed the practice of law in Oswego.

In 1886, was elected to the 50th Congress. He was subsequently re-election in 1888 to the 51st Congress and thus served again from March 4, 1887, until his death. He was succeeded by his immediate predecessor, Sereno E. Payne.

Nutting died on October 15, 1889, in Oswego, New York. He was interred in Riverside Cemetery.

== See also ==
- List of members of the United States Congress who died in office (1790–1899)

== General references ==
- United States Congress. "Newton W. Nutting (id: N000174)". Biographical Directory of the United States Congress.

U.S. House of Representatives
| Preceded by Joseph Mason | Member of the U.S. House of Representatives from New York's 24th congressional district 1883 – 1885 | Succeeded by John S. Pindar |
| Preceded by Sereno E. Payne | Member of the U.S. House of Representatives from New York's 27th congressional district 1887 – 1889 | Succeeded by Sereno E. Payne |
