= John S. Pindar =

American politician (1835–1907)

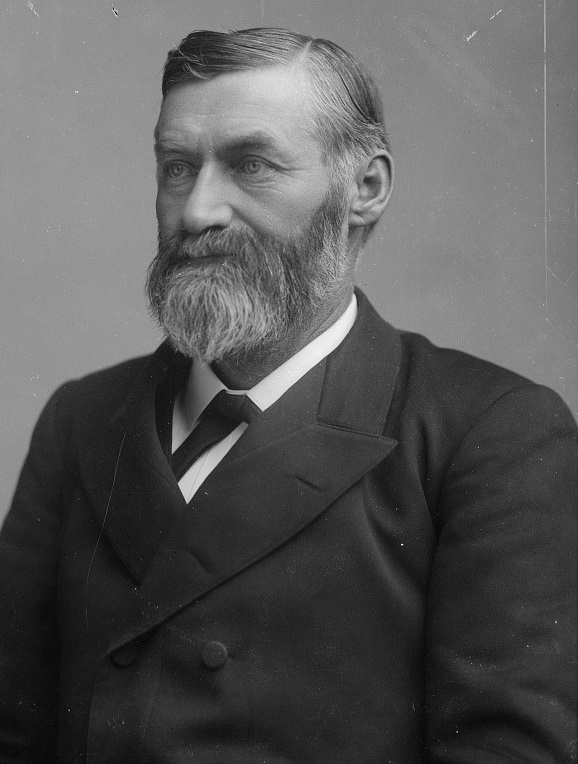
- Pindar c. 1885, C.M. Bell Studio Collection (Library of Congress)

Member of the U.S. House of Representatives from New York's 24th district
- In office November 4, 1890 – March 3, 1891
- Preceded by: David Wilber
- Succeeded by: George Van Horn
- In office March 4, 1885 – March 3, 1887
- Preceded by: Newton W. Nutting
- Succeeded by: David Wilber

Village President of Cobleskill, New York
- In office 1882–1884

Personal details
- Born: John Sigsbee Pindar; November 18, 1835 Sharon, New York, U.S.
- Died: June 30, 1907 (aged 71) Cobleskill, New York, U.S.
- Resting place: Cobleskill Cemetery, Cobleskill, New York, U.S.
- Party: Democratic
- Profession: Politician, lawyer

John Sigsbee Pindar (November 18, 1835 – June 30, 1907) was an American lawyer and politician who served two non-consecutive terms as a U.S. representative from New York from 1885 to 1887, then again briefly from late 1890 to early 1891.

== Biography ==
Born in Sharon, New York, Pindar attended the common schools and Richmondville Seminary. He studied law. He was admitted to the bar in 1865.

He served as president of the village of Cobleskill from 1882 to 1884. He served as chairman of the Democratic county committee for ten years.

=== Congress ===
Pindar was elected as a Democrat to the Forty-ninth Congress (March 4, 1885 – March 3, 1887).

=== Career in between terms ===
He served as delegate to the Democratic National Convention in 1888. He resumed the practice of law in Cobleskill, New York. He was an unsuccessful candidate in 1888 for election to the Fifty-first Congress.

=== Return to Congress ===
Pindar was subsequently elected to the Fifty-first Congress to fill the vacancy caused by the death of David Wilber and served out the remaining four months of the term from November 4, 1890, to March 3, 1891.

=== Later career and death ===
He resumed the practice of law. He died in Cobleskill, New York, June 30, 1907. He was interred in Cobleskill Cemetery.

== Sources ==
- United States Congress. "John S. Pindar (id: P000359)". Biographical Directory of the United States Congress.

U.S. House of Representatives
Preceded by Newton W. Nutting	Member of the U.S. House of Representatives from New York's 24th congressional district 1885–1887	Succeeded by David Wilber
Preceded by David Wilber	Member of the U.S. House of Representatives from New York's 24th congressional district 1890–1891	Succeeded by George Van Horn
