= Benjamin L. Fairchild =

American politician (1863–1946)

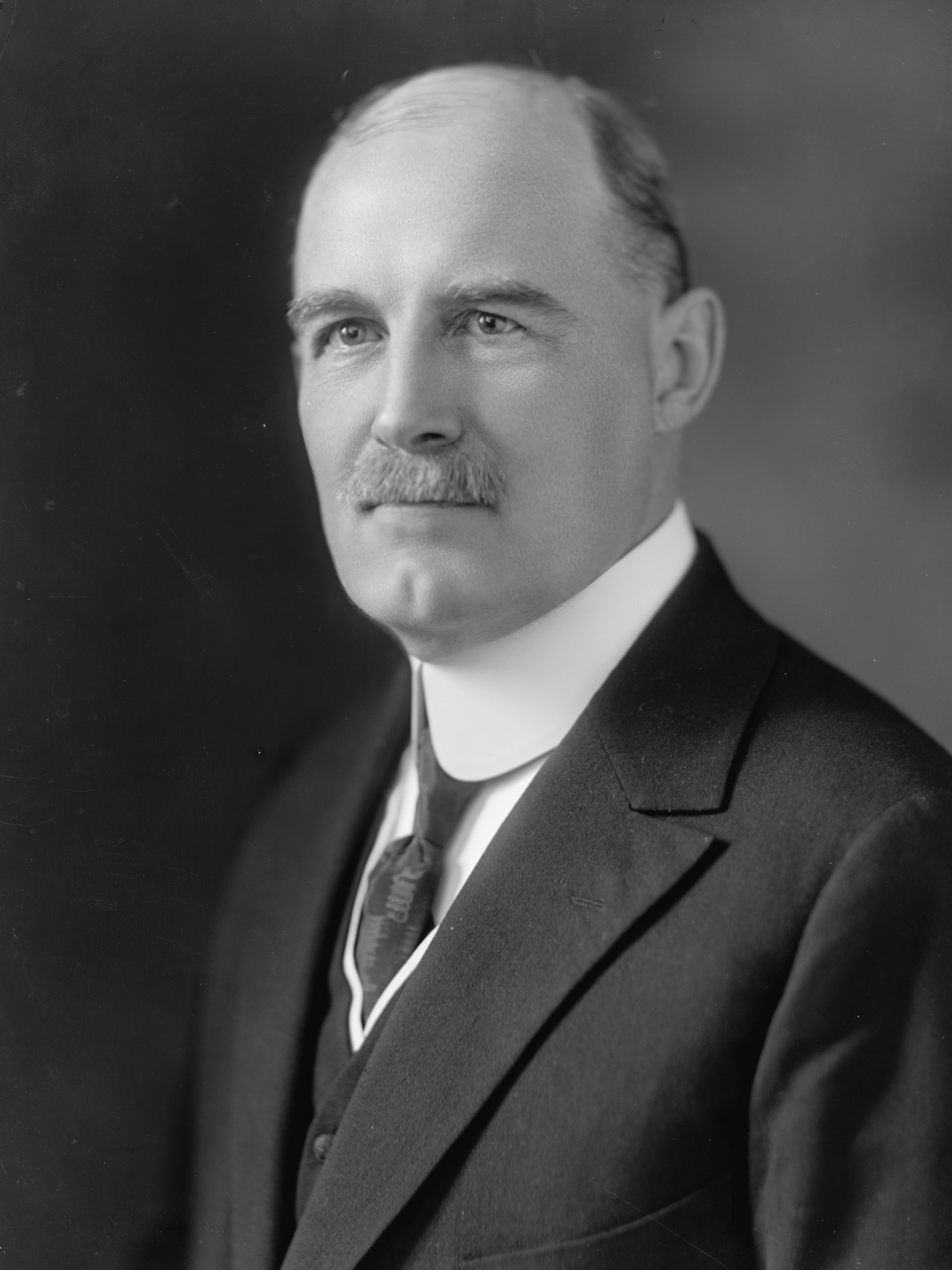

Member of the U.S. House of Representatives from New York
- In office March 4, 1895 – March 3, 1897
- Preceded by: William Ryan
- Succeeded by: William L. Ward
- Constituency: 16th district
- In office March 4, 1917 – March 3, 1919
- Preceded by: Woodson R. Oglesby
- Succeeded by: James V. Ganly
- Constituency: 24th district
- In office March 4, 1921 – March 3, 1923
- Preceded by: James V. Ganly
- Succeeded by: James V. Ganly
- Constituency: 24th district
- In office November 6, 1923 – March 3, 1927
- Preceded by: James V. Ganly
- Succeeded by: James M. Fitzpatrick
- Constituency: 24th district

Personal details
- Born: January 5, 1863 Sweden, New York, USA
- Died: October 25, 1946 (aged 83) Pelham Manor, New York, USA
- Party: Republican
- Education: Columbian University

Benjamin Lewis Fairchild (January 5, 1863 – October 25, 1946) was a U.S. representative from New York.

== Early life and education ==
Born in Sweden, Monroe County, New York, Fairchild attended the public schools of Washington, D.C., and a business college. He graduated from the law department of Columbian University (now George Washington University Law School), in Washington, D.C., in 1885.

== Career ==
He was admitted to the bar in 1885 and commenced practice in New York City. He was employed in the draftsman division of the United States Patent Office from 1877 to 1879. He served as clerk in the Bureau of Engraving and Printing from 1879 to 1885.

Benjamin Fairchild was elected as a Republican to the 54th United States Congress (March 4, 1895 – March 3, 1897). He unsuccessfully contested the election of William L. Ward to the 55th Congress.

Fairchild was elected to the 65th Congress (March 4, 1917 – March 3, 1919). He was an unsuccessful candidate for reelection in 1918 to the 66th Congress.

Fairchild was again elected to the 67th Congress (March 4, 1921 – March 3, 1923). He was an unsuccessful candidate for reelection in 1922 to the 68th Congress, but was subsequently elected to that Congress to fill the vacancy caused by the death of James V. Ganly. He was reelected to the 69th Congress and served from November 6, 1923, to March 3, 1927. Fairchild was an unsuccessful candidate for reelection in 1926 to the Seventieth Congress.

== Personal life ==
Benjamin Fairchild died in Pelham Manor, New York, October 25, 1946. He was interred in Woodlawn Cemetery, Bronx, New York City.

U.S. House of Representatives
Preceded by William Ryan	Member of the U.S. House of Representatives from New York's 16th congressional district March 4, 1895 – March 3, 1897	Succeeded by William L. Ward
Preceded by Woodson R. Oglesby	Member of the U.S. House of Representatives from New York's 24th congressional district March 4, 1917 – March 3, 1919	Succeeded by James V. Ganly
Preceded by James V. Ganly	Member of the U.S. House of Representatives from New York's 24th congressional district March 4, 1921 – March 3, 1923	Succeeded by James V. Ganly
Preceded by James V. Ganly	Member of the U.S. House of Representatives from New York's 24th congressional district November 6, 1923 – March 3, 1927	Succeeded by James M. Fitzpatrick
