= G. Henry P. Gould =

American politician

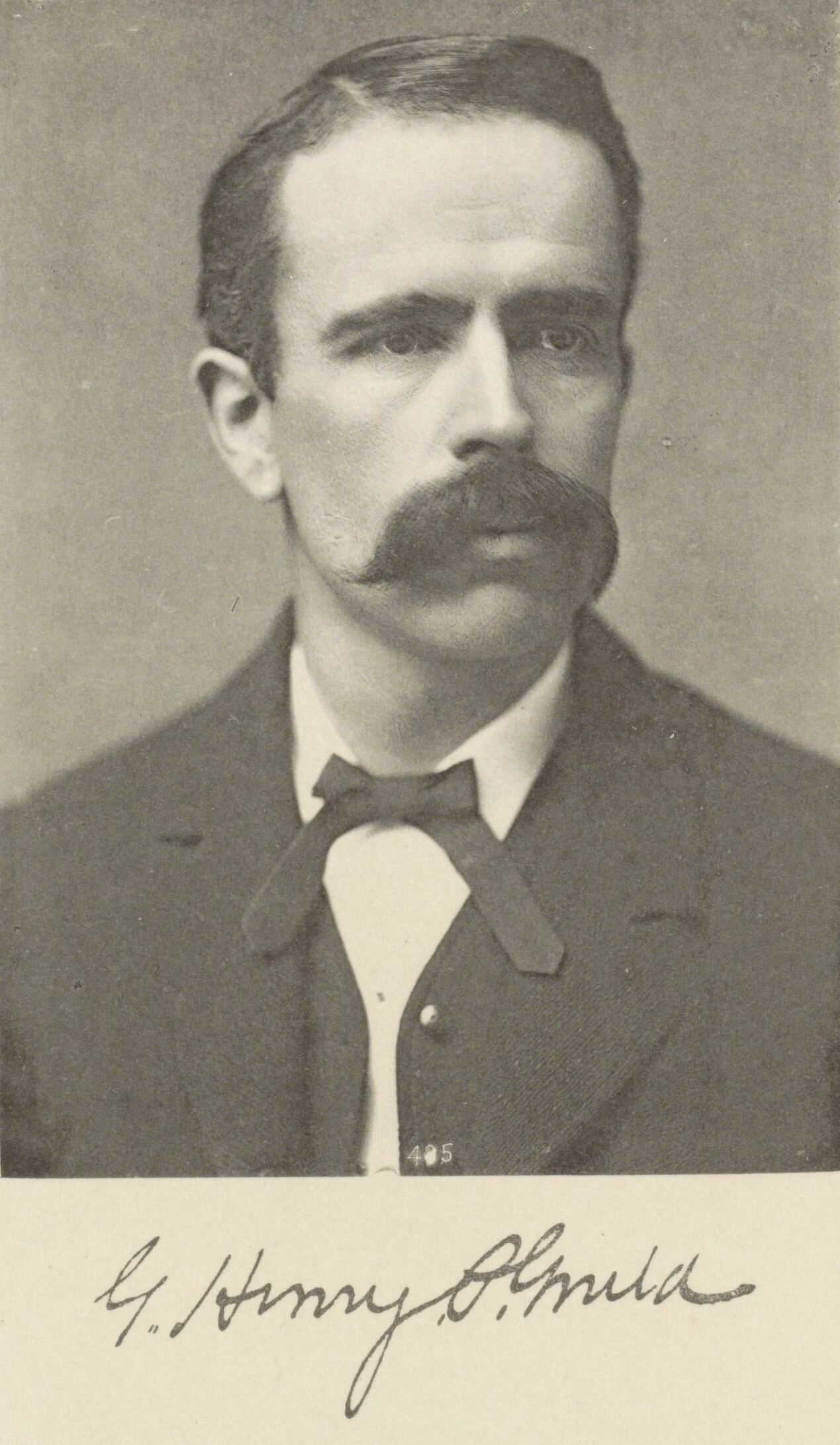
G. Henry P. Gould

Gordias Henry Plumb Gould (June 10, 1848 – June 9, 1919) was an American businessman, manufacturer, and politician from New York.

== Life ==
Gould was born on June 10, 1848, in Lyons Falls, New York. He was the son of Gordias H. Gould, who built the first steamboat in the Black River, and Mary Plumb.

Gould attended Fairfield Seminary and Lowville Academy. When he was 16, he drove a stage coach, later working with the tannery Snyder Brothers in Port Leyden for three years.

In 1869, Gould bought land on the Moose River and started manufacturing lumber. In 1874, he formed a co-partnership with Lyman R. Lyons and purchased more land. He built a mill in 1880 to manufacture pulp and manufactured lumber. In 1891, he purchased paper mills as well. He became president of the Gould Paper Company and the St. Regis Paper Company, with millions of dollars in capital and large timber holdings in New York and Canada. Gould was at one point the largest employer of labor in northern New York. He was also president and director of the Glenfield and Western Railroad Company, a director of the First National Bank of Utica, and a town supervisor of Lyonsdale for eight years. Gould was a mason.

In 1881, Gould was elected to the New York State Assembly as a Democrat, representing Lewis County. He served in the Assembly in 1882, 1885, 1891, and 1892. He was also a delegate to the 1912 Democratic National Convention.

Gould was married three times. His first wife was Elizabeth Pritchard. After she died, he married Nellie Church. His third wife was Ella T. Lennox. He had two children, Harry P. Gould and Eleanor C. Tuttle.

He died on June 9, 1919, in Clifton Springs Sanitarium and was buried in the family plot at Port Leyden Cemetery.

New York State Assembly
Preceded by Charles A. Chickering	New York State Assembly; Lewis County; 1882	Succeeded by Friend Hoyt
Preceded by Charles Allen	New York State Assembly; Lewis County; 1885	Succeeded by Rutson Rea
Preceded by LeRoy Crawford	New York State Assembly; Lewis County; 1891-1892	Succeeded by Hugh Hughes
