= Charles A. Chickering =

American politician (1843–1900)

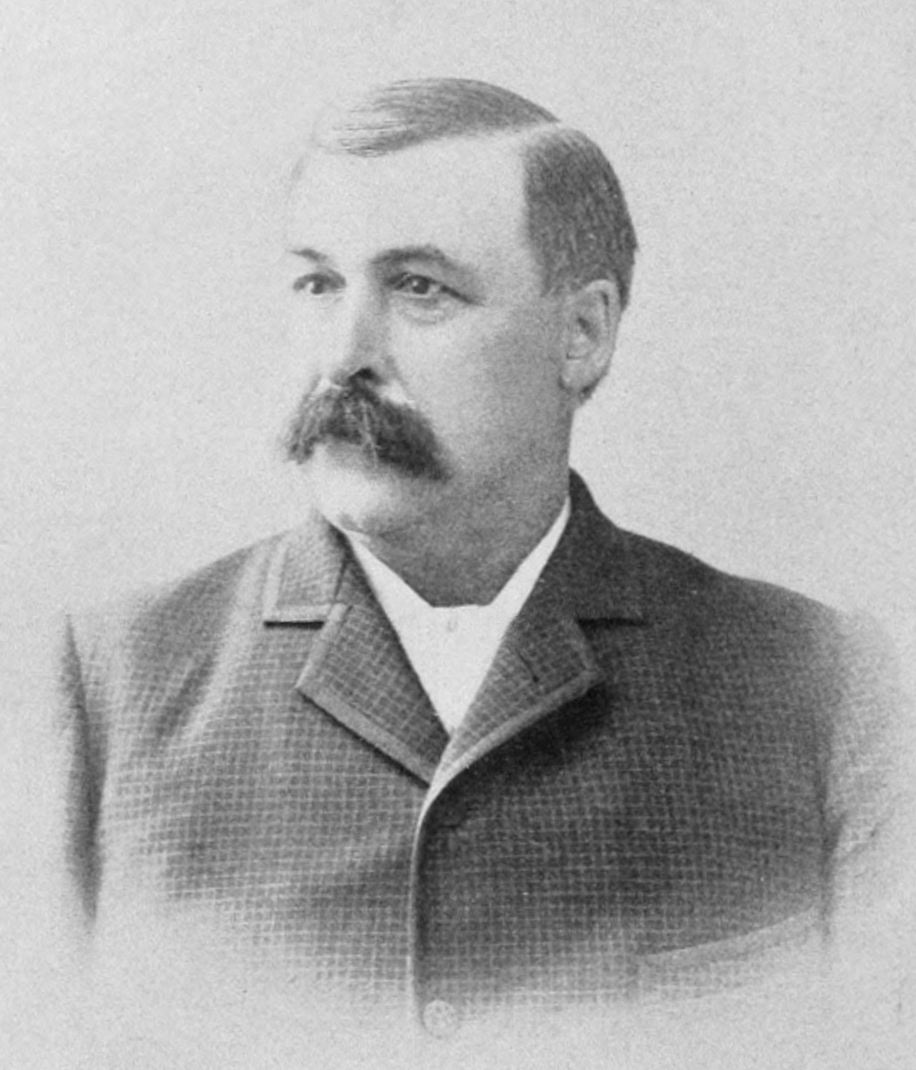

Chair of the House Railways and Canals Committee
- In office March 4, 1895 – February 13, 1900
- Preceded by: Seth W. Cobb
- Succeeded by: James H. Davidson

Member of the U.S. House of Representatives from New York's 24th district
- In office March 4, 1893 – February 13, 1900
- Preceded by: George Van Horn
- Succeeded by: Albert D. Shaw

Member of the New York State Assembly from the Lewis County district
- In office January 1, 1879 – December 31, 1881
- Preceded by: Cyrus L. Sheldon
- Succeeded by: G. Henry P. Gould

Personal details
- Born: Charles Addison Chickering; November 26, 1843 Harrisburg, New York, U.S.
- Died: February 13, 1900 (aged 56) New York City, New York, U.S.
- Party: Republican
- Occupation: Teacher, hardware merchant

Charles Addison Chickering (November 26, 1843 – February 13, 1900) was a U.S. representative from New York.

== Life ==
Born in Harrisburg, New York, Chickering attended the common schools and Lowville Academy and was for some time a teacher in that institution. He engaged in business as a hardware merchant. He served as school commissioner of Lewis County 1865–1875. He was a member of the New York State Assembly for Lewis County in 1879, 1880 and 1881 and was Clerk of the Assembly from 1884 to 1890. He served as chairman of the Lewis County Republican committee. He served as member of the Republican State committee, serving as secretary, and as a member of its executive committee.

Chickering was elected as a Republican to the Fifty-third and to the three succeeding Congresses and served from March 4, 1893, until his accidental death from injuries received in a fall from a window of the Grand Union Hotel in New York City while on a business trip on February 13, 1900. He served as chairman of the Committee on Railways and Canals (Fifty-fourth through Fifty-sixth Congresses). He was interred in Riverside Cemetery in Copenhagen, New York.

== See also ==
- List of members of the United States Congress who died in office (1900–1949)

New York State Assembly
| Preceded by Cyrus L. Sheldon | New York State Assembly; Lewis County; 1879–1881 | Succeeded by G. Henry P. Gould |
U.S. House of Representatives
| Preceded by George Van Horn | Member of the U.S. House of Representatives from New York's 24th congressional district March 4, 1893 – February 13, 1900 | Succeeded by Albert D. Shaw |
