= Woodson R. Oglesby =

American politician (1867–1955)

Woodson Ratcliffe Oglesby
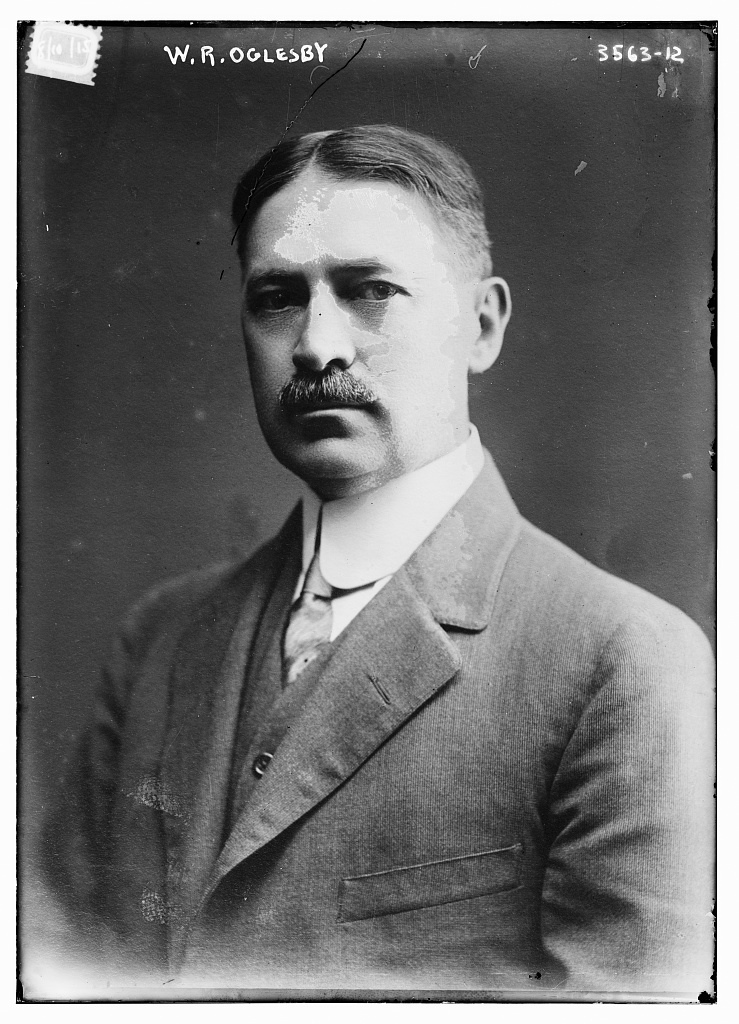

Member of the U.S. House of Representatives from New York's 24th district
- In office March 4, 1913 – March 3, 1917
- Preceded by: George W. Fairchild
- Succeeded by: Benjamin L. Fairchild

Member of the New York State Assembly from the 1st Westchester district
- In office January 1, 1906 – December 31, 1906
- Preceded by: George N. Rigby
- Succeeded by: Harry W. Haines

Personal details
- Born: February 7, 1867 Shelbyville, Kentucky, U.S.
- Died: April 30, 1955 (aged 88) Quincy, Florida, U.S.
- Education: Kentucky Wesleyan College; Illinois Wesleyan University

Woodson Ratcliffe Oglesby (February 9, 1867 – April 30, 1955) was an American lawyer and politician who served two terms as a U.S. representative from New York from 1913 to 1917. He was a cousin of Richard James Oglesby.

== Biography ==
Born near Shelbyville, Kentucky, Oglesby attended the public schools, Kentucky Wesleyan College (then at Millersburg), and the Illinois Wesleyan University at Bloomington. He studied law. He was admitted to the bar in 1890 and commenced practice in New York City.

=== Spanish-American War ===
He served during the Spanish–American War as a private in Company C, Seventy-first Regiment, New York National Guard.

=== Political career ===
He was a member of the New York State Assembly (Westchester Co., 1st D.) in 1906. He was a delegate to the 1912 Democratic National Convention.

==== Congress ====
Oglesby was elected as a Democrat to the 63rd and 64th United States Congresses, holding office from March 4, 1913, to March 3, 1917.

=== Later career and death ===
Afterwards he resumed the practice of law in New York City until his retirement in 1928 and resided in Yonkers, New York, and Quincy, Florida.

He died in Quincy, Florida, April 30, 1955. He was interred in Eastern Cemetery, Quitman, Georgia.

== Sources ==
- United States Congress. "Woodson R. Oglesby (id: O000049)". Biographical Directory of the United States Congress.

New York State Assembly
Preceded by George N. Rigby	New York State Assembly; Westchester County, 1st District; 1906	Succeeded by Harry W. Haines
U.S. House of Representatives
Preceded by George W. Fairchild	Member of the U.S. House of Representatives from New York's 24th congressional district March 4, 1917 – March 3, 1919	Succeeded by Benjamin L. Fairchild
