= Albert D. Shaw =

American politician

Albert Duane Shaw
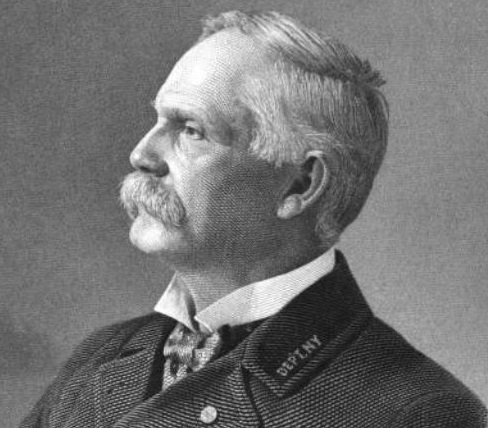
- Albert Duane Shaw, Congressman from New York

Member of the U.S. House of Representatives from New York's 24th district
- In office November 6, 1900 – February 10, 1901
- Preceded by: Charles A. Chickering
- Succeeded by: Charles L. Knapp

Member of the New York State Assembly from Jefferson County's 2nd district
- In office January 1, 1867 – December 31, 1867
- Preceded by: Nelson D. Ferguson
- Succeeded by: Andrew Cornwall

Personal details
- Born: December 21, 1841 Lyme, New York, U.S.
- Died: February 10, 1901 (aged 59) Washington, D.C., U.S.
- Resting place: Brookside Cemetery, Watertown, New York, U.S.
- Party: Republican

Military service
- Allegiance: United States (Union); New York State
- Branch/service: Union Army; New York National Guard
- Years of service: 1861–1866 (Army); 1867-1868 (National Guard)
- Rank: Corporal (Army); Colonel (National Guard)
- Unit: 35th New York Volunteer Infantry Regiment (Army)
- Commands: 36th New York Infantry Regiment (National Guard)
- Battles/wars: American Civil War

Albert Duane Shaw (December 21, 1841 – February 10, 1901) was an American government official and politician from New York. A Union Army veteran of the American Civil War, he was most notable for his service as commander-in-chief of the Grand Army of the Republic and a U.S. representative from New York's 24th congressional district.

== Biography ==
Shaw was born in Lyme, New York, on December 21, 1841, a son of Henry Shaw and Sally Ann (Gardner) Shaw. Shaw was raised on his family's farm in Lyme, and attended the local schools. He was a student at Union Academy in Belleville and St. Lawrence University in Canton before leaving school to join the military.

== Military service ==
Shaw enlisted in the Union Army for the American Civil War, joining Company A, 35th New York Volunteer Infantry Regiment as a private in June 1861. He was later promoted to corporal, and he served until being mustered out with the rest of his regiment in June 1863. Shaw took part in the regiment's activities in Virginia and Maryland, including; construction of Fort Tillinghast and Fort Craig (autumn 1861); guard and patrol duty in and around Falls Church, Virginia (winter 1861-1862); guard and patrol duty in and around Falmouth, Virginia (spring 1862); battles at Rappahannock Station, White Sulphur Springs, and Gainesville (summer 1862); Second Battle of Bull Run (August 1862); Chantilly (September 1862); South Mountain (September 1862); Antietam (September 1862); and Fredericksburg (December 1862). In January, 1863, the regiment was assigned to the provost guard brigade in Falmouth, and also performed guard and patrol duty along the Aquia Creek railroad. In May, the regiment left Maryland for New York so it could be mustered out.

After his discharge, Shaw was appointed a special agent of the Army provost marshal's office in Watertown, and served until the close of the war. The provost marshal's duties included keeping track of men eligible for military service, and compelling them to report if they refused to answer the call. In addition, the provost marshal kept records on paid substitutes and men who had been paid bounties to enlist, and arrested them if they failed to leave for the front lines. The provost marshal's staff also tracked down deserters from the front lines and returned them to their units or imprisoned them.

After the war, Shaw was commissioned as a colonel and assigned as commander of the New York National Guard's 36th Infantry Regiment. He served until resigning in 1868 to accept a US consul's appointment.

== Start of career ==
Shaw returned to St. Lawrence University after the Civil War, but left before completing his degree. In 1866, he was a successful Republican candidate for the New York State Assembly from the 2nd District of Jefferson County, and he served in the 90th New York State Legislature (1867).

In 1868, Shaw was appointed as United States consul in Toronto, Canada. He served until 1878, and Hamilton Fish, Secretary of State, commended Shaw's written reports as the best in the consular service. In 1878, Shaw was appointed as consul in Manchester, England, and he served until 1885, when the newly-elected administration of Grover Cleveland replaced him with a Democratic appointee.

== Later career ==
After leaving Manchester, Shaw resided in Watertown, and was a sought after speaker for holidays, the dedications of Civil War memorials, and Republican political campaigns. He was also active in Watertown's civic life, including service as president of its Young Men's Christian Association (YMCA) and chamber of commerce.

Shaw was long active in the Grand Army of the Republic, and was elected department commander for New York in 1897. In 1899 he was elected commander-in-chief of the GAR's national organization, and he served until 1900.

== Congressman ==
In 1900, Shaw was elected as a Republican to fill the vacancy in the 56th Congress that was caused by the death of Charles A. Chickering. He was reelected to the 57th Congress, but died before the term began on March 4, 1901. Shaw's brief Congressional service spanned from November 6, 1900 until his death.

== Death and burial ==
Shaw died in Washington, D.C., on February 10, 1901. News accounts indicated that he returned to his room at the Riggs House hotel after attending a banquet in honor of Leo Rassieur, his successor as GAR commander-in-chief. He was found dead the next morning, and the physician summoned to his room found the cause to be apoplexy (a stroke). He was interred at Brookside Cemetery in Watertown, New York.

== Family ==
In 1872, Shaw married Mary Sherwood Keith of Chicago. They were the parents of three children - Henry L. Keith Shaw, Mabel Keith Shaw, and Minnie Scott Shaw.

== See also ==
- List of members of the United States Congress who died in office (1900–1949)

== Sources ==
=== Books ===
- Child, Hamilton (1890). Geographical Gazetteer of Jefferson County, N.Y. Vol. Parts 1 and 2. Syracuse Journal Company: Syracuse Journal Company. pp. 152–153, 159–160.
- Haddock, John A. (1894). Growth of a Century: As illustrated in the History of Jefferson County, New York, from 1793 to 1894. Philadelphia, PA: Sherman & Co. pp. 57-61, 83–84.
- St. Lawrence University (1886). Catalogue of Students and Not Graduates of St. Lawrence University, 1886-1885. Catalogue number. Canton, NY: St. Lawrence Plain Dealer Steam Presses. p. 10 – via HathiTrust.

=== Newspapers ===
- "Col. Albert D. Shaw of Watertown Was Elected Department Commander of the State Grand Army of the Republic". The New York Times. New York, NY. May 20, 1897. p. 1 – via Newspapers.com.
- "The New York Man Was Elected: There Was No Opposition to Col. Albert D. Shaw As Commander in Chief". The Brooklyn Citizen. Brooklyn, NY. September 7, 1899. p. 12 – via Newspapers.com.
- "Seven New Members of the Present House". The Standard Union. Brooklyn, NY. November 21, 1900. p. 12 – via Newspapers.com.
- "Col. Albert D. Shaw Dies from Apoplexy". The Buffalo Enquirer. Buffalo, NY. February 11, 1901. p. 6 – via Newspapers.com.
- "Funeral of Colonel Shaw". Elmira Daily Gazette and Free Press. Elmira, NY. February 14, 1901. p. 2 – via Newspapers.com.

New York State Assembly
Preceded by Nelson D. Ferguson	New York State Assembly; Jefferson County 2nd District; 1867	Succeeded by Andrew Cornwall
U.S. House of Representatives
Preceded by Charles A. Chickering	Member of the U.S. House of Representatives from New York's 24th congressional district November 6, 1900 – February 10, 1901	Succeeded by Charles L. Knapp
