= Benjamin J. Rabin =

American politician

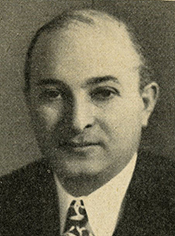

Member of the U.S. House of Representatives from New York's 24th district
- In office January 3, 1945 – December 31, 1947
- Preceded by: James M. Fitzpatrick
- Succeeded by: Leo Isacson

Personal details
- Born: June 3, 1896 Rochester, New York, U.S.
- Died: February 22, 1969 (aged 72) Fort Lauderdale, Florida, U.S.
- Party: Democratic
- Spouse: Syd Sobel Rabin
- Education: New York University School of Law

Military service
- Allegiance: United States of America
- Branch/service: United States Navy
- Years of service: 1917-1919 (Navy); 1919-1921 (Navy Reserve)
- Rank: Ensign
- Battles/wars: World War I

Benjamin J. Rabin (June 3, 1896 – February 22, 1969) was an American lawyer, jurist, World War I veteran, and politician who served one term as a Democratic member of the United States House of Representatives from New York from 1945 to 1947.

== Background ==
Benjamin Jacob Rabin was born on June 3, 1896, in Rochester, New York. He attended New York University School of Law.

=== World War I ===
Rabin left school to join the United States Navy during World War I. He served from May 30, 1917, until January 1919, and attained the rank of ensign. Rabin remained in the Navy Reserve until 1921. He graduated from the New York University School of Law in 1919.

=== Career ===
In 1919, Rabin attained admission to the bar and became an attorney. In 1934–1935, Rabin served as counsel to the New York State Legislature's joint committee that investigated guaranteed mortgages. He then served as counsel to the New York York State Mortgage Commission 1935-1937 and chairman of the commission 1937–1939. During World War II, he headed the Bronx Board of Appeals Board for the Selective Service System.

==== Congress ====
In 1944, Rabin was elected to Congress as a Democrat, having accepted support from the Liberal Party of New York State but not the American Labor Party. He served from January 3, 1945, until his nomination on August 7, 1947, by the Democratic judicial district convention for a vacancy as Justice of the New York Supreme Court.

==== Jurist ====
On November 4, 1947, Rabin was elected to the New York Supreme Court for a full fourteen-year term. He resigned his seat formally on December 31, 1947. (Leo Isacson won his congressional seat.)

In January 1955, Rabin was appointed an associate justice of the Supreme Court's appellate division for the term ending December 31, 1961. He was reelected in 1961, and served as a judge from January 5, 1948, until his death.

=== Personal life ===
Rabin married Syd Sobel Rabin; they had no children.

=== Death ===
Rabin died age 70 on February 22, 1969, in Palm Beach, Florida. He was buried at Riverside Cemetery in Saddle Brook, New Jersey.

== See also ==
- List of Jewish members of the United States Congress
- Leo Isacson

U.S. House of Representatives
Preceded by James M. Fitzpatrick	Member of the U.S. House of Representatives from New York's 24th congressional district 1945–1947	Succeeded by Leo Isacson
