= George Van Horn =

American politician

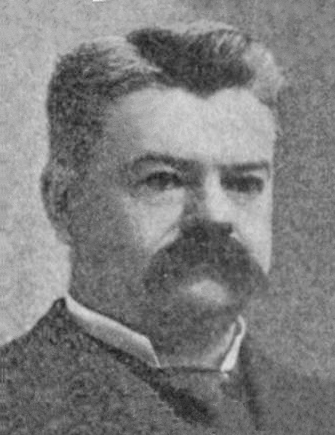
- Horn, c. 1901

Member of the U.S. House of Representatives from New York's 24th district
- In office March 4, 1891 – March 3, 1893
- Preceded by: John S. Pindar
- Succeeded by: Charles A. Chickering

Personal details
- Born: February 5, 1850 Otsego, New York, U.S.
- Died: May 3, 1904 (aged 54) Cooperstown, New York, U.S.
- Resting place: Lakewood Cemetery, Cooperstown, New York
- Party: Democratic

George Van Horn (February 5, 1850 – May 3, 1904) was a U.S. representative from New York.

Born in Otsego, New York, Van Horn attended the common schools, the Cooperstown Seminary, and the New Berlin Academy. He studied law. He was admitted to the bar in February 1871 and practiced in Cooperstown, New York.

Van Horn was elected clerk of Otsego County in 1881 and reelected in 1884.

Van Horn was elected supervisor of Otsego and twice reelected. He served as member of the Democratic county committee.

Van Horn was elected as a Democrat to the Fifty-second Congress (March 4, 1891 – March 3, 1893). He was an unsuccessful candidate for reelection in 1892 to the Fifty-third Congress. He engaged in banking, and was vice president of the Second National Bank of Cooperstown, New York, until his death there on May 3, 1904. He was interred in Lakewood Cemetery.

== Sources ==
- United States Congress. "George Van Horn (id: V000041)". Biographical Directory of the United States Congress.

U.S. House of Representatives
Preceded by John S. Pindar	Member of the U.S. House of Representatives from New York's 24th congressional district 1891 – 1893	Succeeded by Charles A. Chickering
