= List of United States representatives in the 49th Congress =

This is a complete list of United States representatives during the 49th United States Congress listed by seniority.
As an historical article, the districts and party affiliations listed reflect those during the 49th Congress (March 4, 1885 – March 3, 1887). Seats and party affiliations on similar lists for other congresses will be different for certain members.

Seniority depends on the date on which members were sworn into office. Since many members are sworn in on the same day, subsequent ranking is based on previous congressional service of the individual and then by alphabetical order by the last name of the representative.

Committee chairmanship in the House is often associated with seniority. However, party leadership is typically not associated with seniority.

Note: The "*" indicates that the representative/delegate may have served one or more non-consecutive terms while in the House of Representatives of the United States Congress.

== U.S. House seniority list ==
U.S. House seniority
Rank	Representative	Party	District	Seniority date (Previous service, if any)	No.# of term(s)	Notes
1	William D. Kelley	R	PA-04	March 4, 1861	13th term	Dean of the House
2	Samuel J. Randall	D	PA-03	March 4, 1863	12th term	
3	Richard P. Bland	D	MO-11	March 4, 1873	7th term	
4	James Henderson Blount	D	GA-06	March 4, 1873	7th term	
5	Joseph G. Cannon	R	IL-15	March 4, 1873	7th term	
6	Roger Q. Mills	D	TX-09	March 4, 1873	7th term	
7	William Ralls Morrison	D	IL-18	March 4, 1873; Previous service, 1863–1865.	8th term*	Left the House in 1887.
8	Charles O'Neill	R	PA-02	March 4, 1873; Previous service, 1863–1871.	11th term*	
9	Samuel S. Cox	D	NY-08	November 4, 1873; Previous service, 1857–1865 and 1869–1873.	13th term**	Resigned on May 20, 1885. Returned to the House on November 2, 1886, in NY-09.
10	George Cabell	D	VA-05	March 4, 1875	6th term	Left the House in 1887.
11	David B. Culberson	D	TX-04	March 4, 1875	6th term	
12	William H. Forney	D	AL-07	March 4, 1875	6th term	
13	Thomas J. Henderson	R	IL-07	March 4, 1875	6th term	
14	John Henninger Reagan	D	TX-02	March 4, 1875; Previous service, 1857–1861.	8th term*	Left the House in 1887.
15	Otho R. Singleton	D	MS-05	March 4, 1875; Previous service, 1853–1855 and 1857–1861.	9th term**	Left the House in 1887.
16	William McKendree Springer	D	IL-13	March 4, 1875	6th term	
17	John R. Tucker	D	VA-10	March 4, 1875	6th term	Left the House in 1887.
18	John T. Wait	R	CT-03	April 12, 1876	6th term	Left the House in 1887.
19	D. Wyatt Aiken	D	SC-03	March 4, 1877	5th term	Left the House in 1887.
20	Thomas McKee Bayne	R	PA-23	March 4, 1877	5th term	
21	Thomas M. Browne	R	IN-06	March 4, 1877	5th term	
22	John G. Carlisle	D	KY-06	March 4, 1877	5th term	Speaker of the House
23	Thomas R. Cobb	D	IN-02	March 4, 1877	5th term	Left the House in 1887.
24	Robert H. M. Davidson	D	FL-01	March 4, 1877	5th term	
25	Alfred C. Harmer	R	PA-05	March 4, 1877; Previous service, 1871–1875.	7th term*	
26	Hilary A. Herbert	D	AL-02	March 4, 1877	5th term	
27	Frank Hiscock	R	NY-25	March 4, 1877	5th term	Left the House in 1887.
28	John H. Ketcham	R	NY-16	March 4, 1877; Previous service, 1865–1873.	9th term*	
29	Thomas Brackett Reed	R	ME-01	March 4, 1877	5th term	
30	William W. Rice	R	MA-10	March 4, 1877	5th term	Left the House in 1887.
31	Thomas Ryan	R	KS-04	March 4, 1877	5th term	
32	Richard W. Townshend	D	IL-19	March 4, 1877	5th term	
33	Albert S. Willis	D	KY-05	March 4, 1877	5th term	Left the House in 1887.
34	John Alexander Anderson	R	KS-05	March 4, 1879	4th term	
35	Henry H. Bingham	R	PA-01	March 4, 1879	4th term	
36	Martin L. Clardy	D	MO-10	March 4, 1879	4th term	
37	Poindexter Dunn	D	AR-01	March 4, 1879	4th term	
38	George W. Geddes	D	OH-16	March 4, 1879	4th term	Left the House in 1887.
39	Nathaniel Job Hammond	D	GA-05	March 4, 1879	4th term	Left the House in 1887.
40	William H. Hatch	D	MO-01	March 4, 1879	4th term	
41	Leonidas C. Houk	R	TN-02	March 4, 1879	4th term	
42	J. Floyd King	D	LA-05	March 4, 1879	4th term	Left the House in 1887.
43	Benjamin Le Fevre	D	OH-05	March 4, 1879	4th term	Left the House in 1887.
44	Benton McMillin	D	TN-04	March 4, 1879	4th term	
45	John R. Thomas	R	IL-20	March 4, 1879	4th term	
46	Olin Wellborn	D	TX-06	March 4, 1879	4th term	Left the House in 1887.
47	Ezra B. Taylor	R	OH-19	December 13, 1880	4th term	
48	John S. Barbour Jr.	D	VA-08	March 4, 1881	3rd term	Left the House in 1887.
49	Lewis Beach	D	NY-15	March 4, 1881	3rd term	Died on August 10, 1886.
50	Perry Belmont	D	NY-01	March 4, 1881	3rd term	
51	Newton C. Blanchard	D	LA-04	March 4, 1881	3rd term	
52	Charles N. Brumm	R	PA-13	March 4, 1881	3rd term	
53	Jacob Miller Campbell	R	PA-17	March 4, 1881; Previous service, 1877–1879.	4th term*	Left the House in 1887.
54	Judson C. Clements	D	GA-07	March 4, 1881	3rd term	
55	William Ruffin Cox	D	NC-04	March 4, 1881	3rd term	Left the House in 1887.
56	Andrew Gregg Curtin	D	PA-20	March 4, 1881	3rd term	Left the House in 1887.
57	Daniel Ermentrout	D	PA-08	March 4, 1881	3rd term	
58	Richard W. Guenther	R	WI-06	March 4, 1881	3rd term	
59	William Peters Hepburn	R	IA-08	March 4, 1881	3rd term	Left the House in 1887.
60	Abram Hewitt	D	NY-10	March 4, 1881; Previous service, 1875–1879.	5th term*	Resigned on December 30, 1886.
61	William S. Holman	D	IN-04	March 4, 1881; Previous service, 1859–1865 and 1867–1877.	11th term**	
62	Courtland C. Matson	D	IN-05	March 4, 1881	3rd term	
63	William C. Oates	D	AL-03	March 4, 1881	3rd term	
64	Abraham X. Parker	R	NY-22	March 4, 1881	3rd term	
65	Lewis E. Payson	R	IL-09	March 4, 1881	3rd term	
66	Augustus Herman Pettibone	R	TN-01	March 4, 1881	3rd term	Left the House in 1887.
67	Ambrose Ranney	R	MA-03	March 4, 1881	3rd term	Left the House in 1887.
68	George Washington Steele	R	IN-11	March 4, 1881	3rd term	
69	Horace B. Strait	R	MN-03	March 4, 1881; Previous service, 1873–1879.	6th term*	Left the House in 1887.
70	Eben F. Stone	R	MA-07	March 4, 1881	3rd term	Left the House in 1887.
71	Henry G. Turner	D	GA-02	March 4, 1881	3rd term	
72	George D. Wise	D	VA-03	March 4, 1881	3rd term	
73	Nelson Dingley Jr.	R	ME-02	September 12, 1881	3rd term	
74	Henry J. Spooner	R	RI-01	December 5, 1881	3rd term	
75	Robert R. Hitt	R	IL-06	December 4, 1882	3rd term	
76	Seaborn Reese	D	GA-08	December 4, 1882	3rd term	Left the House in 1887.
77	George E. Adams	R	IL-04	March 4, 1883	2nd term	
78	John J. Adams	D	NY-07	March 4, 1883	2nd term	Left the House in 1887.
79	John Arnot Jr.	D	NY-28	March 4, 1883	2nd term	Died on November 20, 1886.
80	Louis E. Atkinson	R	PA-18	March 4, 1883	2nd term	
81	John Goff Ballentine	D	TN-07	March 4, 1883	2nd term	Left the House in 1887.
82	Ethelbert Barksdale	D	MS-07	March 4, 1883	2nd term	Left the House in 1887.
83	Risden Tyler Bennett	D	NC-06	March 4, 1883	2nd term	Left the House in 1887.
84	Charles A. Boutelle	R	ME-04	March 4, 1883	2nd term	
85	Charles Edmund Boyle	D	PA-21	March 4, 1883	2nd term	Left the House in 1887.
86	Clifton R. Breckinridge	D	AR-02	March 4, 1883	2nd term	
87	William Wallace Brown	R	PA-16	March 4, 1883	2nd term	Left the House in 1887.
88	Henry G. Burleigh	R	NY-18	March 4, 1883	2nd term	Left the House in 1887.
89	James N. Burnes	D	MO-04	March 4, 1883	2nd term	
90	Andrew Jackson Caldwell	D	TN-06	March 4, 1883	2nd term	Left the House in 1887.
91	Felix Campbell	D	NY-02	March 4, 1883	2nd term	
92	Allen D. Candler	D	GA-09	March 4, 1883	2nd term	
93	Ezra C. Carleton	D	MI-07	March 4, 1883	2nd term	Left the House in 1887.
94	Patrick Collins	D	MA-04	March 4, 1883	2nd term	
95	Charles Frederick Crisp	D	GA-03	March 4, 1883	2nd term	
96	Byron M. Cutcheon	R	MI-09	March 4, 1883	2nd term	
97	George W. Dargan	D	SC-06	March 4, 1883	2nd term	
98	Robert T. Davis	R	MA-01	March 4, 1883	2nd term	
99	Samuel Dibble	D	SC-01	March 4, 1883; Previous service, 1881–1882.	3rd term*	
100	Alexander Monroe Dockery	D	MO-03	March 4, 1883	2nd term	
101	Ransom W. Dunham	R	IL-01	March 4, 1883	2nd term	
102	Nathaniel B. Eldredge	D	MI-02	March 4, 1883	2nd term	Left the House in 1887.
103	Reuben Ellwood	R	IL-05	March 4, 1883	2nd term	Died on July 1, 1885.
104	Isaac Newton Evans	R	PA-07	March 4, 1883; Previous service, 1877–1879.	3rd term*	Left the House in 1887.
105	James Bowen Everhart	R	PA-06	March 4, 1883	2nd term	Left the House in 1887.
106	John Van Lear Findlay	D	MD-04	March 4, 1883	2nd term	Left the House in 1887.
107	Martin A. Foran	D	OH-21	March 4, 1883	2nd term	
108	Eustace Gibson	D	WV-04	March 4, 1883	2nd term	Left the House in 1887.
109	Nathan Goff Jr.	R	WV-01	March 4, 1883	2nd term	
110	Wharton J. Green	D	NC-03	March 4, 1883	2nd term	Left the House in 1887.
111	John Edward Halsell	D	KY-03	March 4, 1883	2nd term	Left the House in 1887.
112	Lewis Hanback	R	KS-06	March 4, 1883	2nd term	Left the House in 1887.
113	Martin Alonzo Haynes	R	NH-01	March 4, 1883	2nd term	Left the House in 1887.
114	John J. Hemphill	D	SC-05	March 4, 1883	2nd term	
115	David B. Henderson	R	IA-03	March 4, 1883	2nd term	
116	Barclay Henley	D	CA-01	March 4, 1883	2nd term	Left the House in 1887.
117	William D. Hill	D	OH-06	March 4, 1883; Previous service, 1879–1881.	3rd term*	Left the House in 1887.
118	Adoniram J. Holmes	R	IA-10	March 4, 1883	2nd term	
119	Darwin R. James	R	NY-03	March 4, 1883	2nd term	Left the House in 1887.
120	Frederick A. Johnson	R	NY-21	March 4, 1883	2nd term	Left the House in 1887.
121	James H. Jones	D	TX-03	March 4, 1883	2nd term	Left the House in 1887.
122	John J. Kleiner	D	IN-01	March 4, 1883	2nd term	Left the House in 1887.
123	James Laird	R	NE-02	March 4, 1883	2nd term	
124	S. W. T. Lanham	D	TX-11	March 4, 1883	2nd term	
125	Charles Le Moyne Mitchell	D	CT-02	March 4, 1883	2nd term	Left the House in 1887.
126	Harry Libbey	R	VA-02	March 4, 1883	2nd term	Left the House in 1887.
127	John Davis Long	R	MA-02	March 4, 1883	2nd term	
128	Charles B. Lore	D	DE	March 4, 1883	2nd term	Left the House in 1887.
129	Henry B. Lovering	D	MA-06	March 4, 1883	2nd term	Left the House in 1887.
130	Robert Lowry	D	IN-12	March 4, 1883	2nd term	Left the House in 1887.
131	William C. Maybury	D	MI-01	March 4, 1883	2nd term	Left the House in 1887.
132	William McAdoo	D	NJ-07	March 4, 1883	2nd term	
133	Louis E. McComas	R	MD-06	March 4, 1883	2nd term	
134	Stephen C. Millard	R	NY-26	March 4, 1883	2nd term	Left the House in 1887.
135	James Francis Miller	D	TX-08	March 4, 1883	2nd term	Left the House in 1887.
136	Seth L. Milliken	R	ME-03	March 4, 1883	2nd term	
137	Edmund Needham Morrill	R	KS-01	March 4, 1883	2nd term	
138	Nicholas Muller	D	NY-06	March 4, 1883; Previous service, 1877–1881.	4th term*	Left the House in 1887.
139	Jeremiah Henry Murphy	D	IA-02	March 4, 1883	2nd term	Left the House in 1887.
140	William H. Neece	D	IL-11	March 4, 1883	2nd term	Left the House in 1887.
141	Knute Nelson	R	MN-05	March 4, 1883	2nd term	
142	James E. O'Hara	R	NC-02	March 4, 1883	2nd term	Left the House in 1887.
143	John J. O'Neill	D	MO-08	March 4, 1883	2nd term	
144	Sereno E. Payne	R	NY-27	March 4, 1883	2nd term	Left the House in 1887.
145	Samuel W. Peel	D	AR-05	March 4, 1883	2nd term	
146	Bishop W. Perkins	R	KS-03	March 4, 1883	2nd term	
147	Samuel R. Peters	R	KS-07	March 4, 1883	2nd term	
148	William Walter Phelps	R	NJ-05	March 4, 1883; Previous service, 1873–1875.	3rd term*	
149	William T. Price	R	WI-08	March 4, 1883	2nd term	Died on December 6, 1886.
150	Joseph Rankin	D	WI-05	March 4, 1883	2nd term	Died on January 24, 1886.
151	Thomas A. Robertson	D	KY-04	March 4, 1883	2nd term	Left the House in 1887.
152	James M. Riggs	D	IL-12	March 4, 1883	2nd term	Left the House in 1887.
153	John H. Rogers	D	AR-04	March 4, 1883	2nd term	
154	Jonathan H. Rowell	R	IL-14	March 4, 1883	2nd term	
155	George E. Seney	D	OH-07	March 4, 1883	2nd term	
156	Edward Woodruff Seymour	D	CT-04	March 4, 1883	2nd term	Left the House in 1887.
157	John T. Spriggs	D	NY-23	March 4, 1883	2nd term	Left the House in 1887.
158	Isaac Stephenson	R	WI-09	March 4, 1883	2nd term	
159	Charles Stewart	D	TX-01	March 4, 1883	2nd term	
160	John Wolcott Stewart	R	VT-01	March 4, 1883	2nd term	
161	John Brutzman Storm	D	PA-11	March 4, 1883; Previous service, 1871–1875.	4th term*	Left the House in 1887.
162	Isaac S. Struble	R	IA-11	March 4, 1883	2nd term	
163	John May Taylor	D	TN-08	March 4, 1883	2nd term	Left the House in 1887.
164	James W. Throckmorton	D	TX-05	March 4, 1883; Previous service, 1875–1879.	4th term*	Left the House in 1887.
165	George D. Tillman	D	SC-02	March 4, 1883; Previous service, 1879–1882.	4th term*	
166	Henry Smith Van Eaton	D	MS-06	March 4, 1883	2nd term	Left the House in 1887.
167	James Wakefield	R	MN-02	March 4, 1883	2nd term	Left the House in 1887.
168	Thomas B. Ward	D	IN-09	March 4, 1883	2nd term	Left the House in 1887.
169	Adoniram J. Warner	D	OH-17	March 4, 1883; Previous service, 1879–1881.	3rd term*	Left the House in 1887.
170	Archibald J. Weaver	R	NE-01	March 4, 1883	2nd term	Left the House in 1887.
171	Milo White	R	MN-01	March 4, 1883	2nd term	Left the House in 1887.
172	William Whiting II	R	MA-11	March 4, 1883	2nd term	
173	Beriah Wilkins	D	OH-15	March 4, 1883	2nd term	
174	William Lyne Wilson	D	WV-02	March 4, 1883	2nd term	
175	Edwin B. Winans	D	MI-06	March 4, 1883	2nd term	Left the House in 1887.
176	Frank Lane Wolford	D	KY-11	March 4, 1883	2nd term	Left the House in 1887.
177	Nicholas E. Worthington	D	IL-10	March 4, 1883	2nd term	Left the House in 1887.
178	Charles P. Snyder	D	WV-03	May 15, 1883	2nd term	
179	Thomas Gregory Skinner	D	NC-01	November 20, 1883	2nd term	Left the House in 1887.
180	James T. Jones	D	AL-01	December 3, 1883; Previous service, 1877–1879.	3rd term*	
181	Francis W. Rockwell	R	MA-12	January 17, 1884	2nd term	
182	Robert Smalls	R	SC-07	March 18, 1884; Previous service, 1875–1879 and 1882–1883.	5th term**	Left the House in 1887.
183	Edward H. Funston	R	KS-02	March 21, 1884	2nd term	
184	Charles Triplett O'Ferrall	D	VA-07	May 5, 1884	2nd term	
185	James E. Campbell	D	OH-03	June 20, 1884	2nd term	
186	James W. Reid	D	NC-05	January 28, 1885	2nd term	Resigned on December 31, 1886.
187	Charles Herbert Allen	R	MA-08	March 4, 1885	1st term	
188	John Mills Allen	D	MS-01	March 4, 1885	1st term	
189	Charles Marley Anderson	D	OH-04	March 4, 1885	1st term	Left the House in 1887.
190	Charles S. Baker	R	NY-30	March 4, 1885	1st term	
191	George Thomas Barnes	D	GA-10	March 4, 1885	1st term	
192	Frederick G. Barry	D	MS-04	March 4, 1885	1st term	
193	Archibald M. Bliss	D	NY-05	March 4, 1885; Previous service, 1875–1883.	5th term*	
194	Franklin Bound	R	PA-14	March 4, 1885	1st term	
195	James Dennis Brady	R	VA-04	March 4, 1885	1st term	Left the House in 1887.
196	Edward S. Bragg	D	WI-02	March 4, 1885; Previous service, 1877–1883.	4th term*	Left the House in 1887.
197	William Campbell Preston Breckinridge	D	KY-07	March 4, 1885	1st term	
198	Charles Elwood Brown	R	OH-02	March 4, 1885	1st term	
199	James Buchanan	R	NJ-02	March 4, 1885	1st term	
200	John R. Buck	R	CT-01	March 4, 1885; Previous service, 1881–1883.	2nd term*	Left the House in 1887.
201	Frank Charles Bunnell	R	PA-15	March 4, 1885; Previous service, 1872–1873.	2nd term*	
202	Julius C. Burrows	R	MI-04	March 4, 1885; Previous service, 1873–1875 and 1879–1883.	4th term**	
203	Benjamin Butterworth	R	OH-01	March 4, 1885; Previous service, 1879–1883.	3rd term*	
204	William D. Bynum	D	IN-07	March 4, 1885	1st term	
205	Lucien B. Caswell	R	WI-01	March 4, 1885; Previous service, 1875–1883.	5th term*	
206	Thomas C. Catchings	D	MS-03	March 4, 1885	1st term	
207	William Hinson Cole	D	MD-03	March 4, 1885	1st term	Died on July 8, 1886.
208	Barnes Compton	D	MD-05	March 4, 1885	1st term	
209	Charles C. Comstock	D	MI-05	March 4, 1885	1st term	Left the House in 1887.
210	Edwin H. Conger	R	IA-07	March 4, 1885	1st term	
211	William C. Cooper	R	OH-09	March 4, 1885	1st term	
212	William H. H. Cowles	D	NC-08	March 4, 1885	1st term	
213	William H. Crain	D	TX-07	March 4, 1885	1st term	
214	Thomas Croxton	D	VA-01	March 4, 1885	1st term	Left the House in 1887.
215	John W. Daniel	D	VA-06	March 4, 1885	1st term	Left the House in 1887.
216	Ira Davenport	R	NY-29	March 4, 1885	1st term	
217	Alexander C. Davidson	D	AL-04	March 4, 1885	1st term	
218	William Dawson	D	MO-14	March 4, 1885	1st term	Left the House in 1887.
219	George Washington Emery Dorsey	R	NE-03	March 4, 1885	1st term	
220	Charles Dougherty	D	FL-02	March 4, 1885	1st term	
221	Abraham Dowdney	D	NY-12	March 4, 1885	1st term	Died on December 10, 1886.
222	John R. Eden	D	IL-17	March 4, 1885; Previous service, 1863–1865 and 1873–1879.	5th term**	Left the House in 1887.
223	Frederick D. Ely	R	MA-09	March 4, 1885	1st term	Left the House in 1887.
224	William W. Ellsberry	D	OH-11	March 4, 1885	1st term	Left the House in 1887.
225	John M. Farquhar	R	NY-32	March 4, 1885	1st term	
226	Charles N. Felton	R	CA-05	March 4, 1885	1st term	
227	Spencer O. Fisher	D	MI-10	March 4, 1885	1st term	
228	George Washington Fleeger	R	PA-26	March 4, 1885	1st term	Left the House in 1887.
229	George Ford	D	IN-13	March 4, 1885	1st term	Left the House in 1887.
230	Benjamin T. Frederick	D	IA-05	March 4, 1885	1st term	Left the House in 1887.
231	William E. Fuller	R	IA-04	March 4, 1885	1st term	
232	Jacob Harold Gallinger	R	NH-02	March 4, 1885	1st term	
233	Edward J. Gay	D	LA-03	March 4, 1885	1st term	
234	Charles Hopper Gibson	D	MD-01	March 4, 1885	1st term	
235	John Gilfillan	R	MN-04	March 4, 1885	1st term	Left the House in 1887.
236	Presley T. Glass	D	TN-09	March 4, 1885	1st term	
237	John Milton Glover	D	MO-09	March 4, 1885	1st term	
238	Robert Stockton Green	D	NJ-03	March 4, 1885	1st term	Resigned on January 17, 1887.
239	Charles H. Grosvenor	R	OH-14	March 4, 1885	1st term	
240	William W. Grout	R	VT-02	March 4, 1885; Previous service, 1881–1883.	2nd term*	
241	Michael Hahn	R	LA-02	March 4, 1885; Previous service, 1862–1863.	2nd term*	Died on March 15, 1886.
242	John Blackwell Hale	D	MO-02	March 4, 1885	1st term	Left the House in 1887.
243	Benton Jay Hall	D	IA-01	March 4, 1885	1st term	Left the House in 1887.
244	Henry R. Harris	D	GA-04	March 4, 1885; Previous service, 1873–1879.	4th term*	Left the House in 1887.
245	Edward D. Hayden	R	MA-05	March 4, 1885	1st term	
246	John T. Heard	D	MO-06	March 4, 1885	1st term	
247	John S. Henderson	D	NC-07	March 4, 1885	1st term	
248	Binger Hermann	R	OR	March 4, 1885	1st term	
249	John Andrew Hiestand	R	PA-09	March 4, 1885	1st term	
250	George Hires	R	NJ-01	March 4, 1885	1st term	
251	Jonas G. Howard	D	IN-03	March 4, 1885	1st term	
252	John E. Hutton	D	MO-07	March 4, 1885	1st term	
253	Oscar Lawrence Jackson	R	PA-24	March 4, 1885	1st term	
254	James T. Johnston	R	IN-08	March 4, 1885	1st term	
255	Thomas D. Johnston	D	NC-09	March 4, 1885	1st term	
256	Alfred Briggs Irion	D	LA-06	March 4, 1885	1st term	Left the House in 1887.
257	Polk Laffoon	D	KY-02	March 4, 1885	1st term	
258	Robert M. La Follette Sr.	R	WI-03	March 4, 1885	1st term	
259	Silas Z. Landes	D	IL-16	March 4, 1885	1st term	
260	Frank Lawler	D	IL-02	March 4, 1885	1st term	
261	Herman Lehlbach	R	NJ-06	March 4, 1885	1st term	
262	James Girard Lindsley	R	NY-17	March 4, 1885	1st term	Left the House in 1887.
263	John Little	D	OH-08	March 4, 1885	1st term	Left the House in 1887.
264	James A. Louttit	R	CA-02	March 4, 1885	1st term	Left the House in 1887.
265	Joseph Lyman	R	IA-09	March 4, 1885	1st term	
266	Peter P. Mahoney	D	NY-04	March 4, 1885	1st term	
267	Henry Markham	R	CA-06	March 4, 1885	1st term	Left the House in 1887.
268	John Mason Martin	D	AL-06	March 4, 1885	1st term	Left the House in 1887.
269	Louis St. Martin	D	LA-01	March 4, 1885; Previous service, 1851–1853.	2nd term*	Left the House in 1887.
270	James B. McCreary	D	KY-08	March 4, 1885	1st term	
271	Joseph McKenna	R	CA-03	March 4, 1885	1st term	
272	William McKinley	R	OH-20	March 4, 1885; Previous service, 1877–1884.	5th term*	
273	Truman A. Merriman	D	NY-11	March 4, 1885	1st term	
274	Seth C. Moffatt	R	MI-11	March 4, 1885	1st term	
275	James B. Morgan	D	MS-02	March 4, 1885	1st term	
276	William W. Morrow	R	CA-04	March 4, 1885	1st term	
277	John R. Neal	D	TN-03	March 4, 1885	1st term	
278	James S. Negley	R	PA-22	March 4, 1885; Previous service, 1869–1875.	4th term*	Left the House in 1887.
279	Thomas M. Norwood	D	GA-01	March 4, 1885	1st term	
280	James O'Donnell	R	MI-03	March 4, 1885	1st term	
281	Edwin Sylvanus Osborne	R	PA	March 4, 1885	1st term	
282	Joseph H. Outhwaite	D	OH-13	March 4, 1885	1st term	
283	William D. Owen	R	IN-10	March 4, 1885	1st term	
284	William H. Perry	D	SC-04	March 4, 1885	1st term	
285	James N. Pidcock	D	NJ-04	March 4, 1885	1st term	
286	John S. Pindar	D	NY-24	March 4, 1885	1st term	Left the House in 1887.
287	William A. Pirce	R	RI-02	March 4, 1885	1st term	Resigned on January 25, 1887.
288	Ralph Plumb	R	IL-08	March 4, 1885	1st term	
289	Joseph Pulitzer	D	NY-09	March 4, 1885	1st term	Resigned on April 10, 1886.
290	James D. Richardson	D	TN-05	March 4, 1885	1st term	
291	Jacob Romeis	R	OH-10	March 4, 1885	1st term	
292	Thomas William Sadler	D	AL-05	March 4, 1885	1st term	Left the House in 1887.
293	John G. Sawyer	R	NY-31	March 4, 1885	1st term	
294	Joseph D. Sayers	D	TX-10	March 4, 1885	1st term	
295	William Lawrence Scott	D	PA-27	March 4, 1885	1st term	
296	Joseph A. Scranton	R	PA-12	March 4, 1885; Previous service, 1881–1883.	2nd term*	Left the House in 1887.
297	Walter L. Sessions	R	NY-34	March 4, 1885; Previous service, 1871–1875.	3rd term*	Left the House in 1887.
298	Frank T. Shaw	D	MD-02	March 4, 1885	1st term	
299	William Henry Sowden	D	PA-10	March 4, 1885	1st term	
300	John Swinburne	R	NY-19	March 4, 1885	1st term	Left the House in 1887.
301	William G. Stahlnecker	D	NY-14	March 4, 1885	1st term	
302	William J. Stone	D	MO-12	March 4, 1885	1st term	
303	William Johnson Stone	D	KY-01	March 4, 1885	1st term	
304	George G. Symes	R	CO	March 4, 1885	1st term	
305	Timothy E. Tarsney	D	MI-08	March 4, 1885	1st term	
306	William P. Taulbee	D	KY-10	March 4, 1885	1st term	
307	Isaac H. Taylor	R	OH-18	March 4, 1885	1st term	Left the House in 1887.
308	Zachary Taylor	R	TN-10	March 4, 1885	1st term	Left the House in 1887.
309	Ormsby B. Thomas	R	WI-07	March 4, 1885	1st term	
310	Albert C. Thompson	R	OH-12	March 4, 1885	1st term	
311	Connally Findlay Trigg	D	VA-09	March 4, 1885	1st term	Left the House in 1887.
312	Isaac W. Van Schaick	R	WI-04	March 4, 1885	1st term	Left the House in 1887.
313	Egbert Ludovicus Viele	D	NY-13	March 4, 1885	1st term	Left the House in 1887.
314	William H. Wade	R	MO-13	March 4, 1885	1st term	
315	William H. Wadsworth	R	KY-09	March 4, 1885; Previous service, 1861–1865.	3rd term*	Left the House in 1887.
316	James Hugh Ward	D	IL-03	March 4, 1885	1st term	Left the House in 1887.
317	William Warner	R	MO-05	March 4, 1885	1st term	
318	James B. Weaver	G	IA-06	March 4, 1885; Previous service, 1879–1881.	2nd term*	
319	John B. Weber	R	NY-33	March 4, 1885	1st term	
320	George West	R	NY-20	March 4, 1885; Previous service, 1881–1883.	2nd term*	
321	Joseph Wheeler	D	AL-08	March 4, 1885; Previous service, 1881–1882 and 1883.	3rd term**	
322	Alexander Colwell White	R	PA-25	March 4, 1885	1st term	Left the House in 1887.
323	William Woodburn	R	NV	March 4, 1885; Previous service, 1875–1877.	2nd term*	
	Timothy J. Campbell	D	NY-08	November 3, 1885	1st term	
	John A. Swope	D	PA-19	November 3, 1885; Previous service, 1884–1885.	2nd term*	Left the House in 1887.
	Albert J. Hopkins	R	IL-05	December 7, 1885	1st term	
	Thomas Chipman McRae	D	AR-03	December 7, 1885	1st term	
	Thomas R. Hudd	D	WI-05	March 8, 1886	1st term	
	Harry Welles Rusk	D	MD-03	November 2, 1886	1st term	
	Henry Bacon	D	NY-15	December 6, 1886	1st term	
	Nathaniel D. Wallace	D	LA-02	December 9, 1886	1st term	Left the House in 1887.
	Hugh H. Price	R	WI-08	January 18, 1887	1st term	Left the House in 1887.
	Charles H. Page	D	RI-02	February 21, 1887	1st term	Left the House in 1887.

== Delegates ==
Rank	Delegate	Party	District	Seniority date (Previous service, if any)	No.# of term(s)	Notes
1	John Thomas Caine	D	UT	November 7, 1882	3rd term	
2	Curtis Coe Bean	R	AZ	March 4, 1885	1st term	
3	Joseph M. Carey	R	WY	March 4, 1885	1st term	
4	Antonio Joseph	D	NM	March 4, 1885	1st term	
5	Oscar S. Gifford	R	DAK	March 4, 1885	1st term	
6	John Hailey	D	ID	March 4, 1885; Previous service, 1873–1875.	2nd term*	
7	Joseph Toole	D	MT	March 4, 1885	1st term	
8	Charles Stewart Voorhees	D	WA	March 4, 1885	1st term	

== See also ==
- 49th United States Congress
- List of United States congressional districts
- List of United States senators in the 49th Congress
