= List of United States senators in the 49th Congress =

This is a complete list of United States senators during the 49th United States Congress listed by seniority from March 4, 1885, to March 3, 1887.

Order of service is based on the commencement of the senator's first term. Behind this is former service as a senator (only giving the senator seniority within their new incoming class), service as vice president, a House member, a cabinet secretary, or a governor of a state. The final factor is the population of the senator's state.

Senators who were sworn in during the middle of the Congress (up until the last senator who was not sworn in early after winning the November 1886 election) are listed at the end of the list with no number.

== Terms of service ==
| Class | Terms of service of senators that expired in years |
|---|---|
| Class 1 | Terms of service of senators that expired in 1887 (CA, CT, DE, FL, IN, MA, MD, ME, MI, MN, MO, MS, MT, NE, NJ, NV, NY, OH, PA, RI, TN, TX, VA, VT, WI, and WV.) |
| Class 2 | Terms of service of senators that expired in 1889 (AL, AR, CO, DE, GA, IA, IL, KS, KY, LA, MA, ME, MI, MN, MS, MT, NC, NE, NH, NJ, OR, RI, SC, TN, TX, VA, and WV.) |
| Class 3 | Terms of service of senators that expired in 1891 (AL, AR, CA, CO, CT, FL, GA, IA, IL, IN, KS, KY, LA, MD, MO, NC, NH, NV, NY, OH, OR, PA, SC, VT, and WI.) |

== U.S. Senate seniority list ==
U.S. Senate seniority
| Rank | Senator (party-state) | Seniority date | Other factors |
|---|---|---|---|
| 1 | George F. Edmunds (R-VT) | April 3, 1866 | |
| 2 | Justin S. Morrill (R-VT) | March 4, 1867 | |
| 3 | Thomas F. Bayard (D-DE) | March 4, 1869 | |
| 4 | Eli Saulsbury (D-DE) | March 4, 1871 | |
| 5 | Matt W. Ransom (D-NC) | January 30, 1872 | |
| 6 | William B. Allison (R-IA) | March 4, 1873 | Former representative |
| 7 | John J. Ingalls (R-KS) | March 4, 1873 | |
| 8 | John P. Jones (R-NV) | March 4, 1873 | |
| 9 | Francis Cockrell (D-MO) | March 4, 1875 | |
| 10 | Henry L. Dawes (R-MA) | March 4, 1875 | |
| 11 | Charles W. Jones (D-FL) | March 4, 1875 | |
| 12 | Samuel J. R. McMillan (R-MN) | March 4, 1875 | |
| 13 | Samuel B. Maxey (D-TX) | March 4, 1875 | |
| 14 | George F. Hoar (R-MA) | March 4, 1877 | Former representative |
| 15 | Isham G. Harris (D-TN) | March 4, 1877 | Former governor |
| 16 | John T. Morgan (D-AL) | March 4, 1877 | |
| 17 | John R. McPherson (D-NJ) | March 4, 1877 | |
| 18 | Matthew Butler (D-SC) | March 4, 1877 | |
| 19 | Richard Coke (D-TX) | March 4, 1877 | |
| 20 | Preston B. Plumb (R-KS) | March 4, 1877 | |
| 21 | James B. Beck (D-KY) | March 4, 1877 | |
| 22 | Lucius Q. C. Lamar (D-MS) | March 4, 1877 | |
| 23 | Augustus H. Garland (D-AR) | March 4, 1877 | Former governor |
| 24 | J. Donald Cameron (R-PA) | March 20, 1877 | |
| 25 | Daniel W. Voorhees (D-IN) | November 6, 1877 | |
| 26 | George G. Vest (D-MO) | March 4, 1879 | Missouri 5th in population (1870) |
| 27 | Orville H. Platt (R-CT) | March 4, 1879 | Connecticut 25th in population (1870) |
| 28 | Wilkinson Call (D-FL) | March 4, 1879 | Florida 33rd in population (1870) |
| 29 | Zebulon Vance (D-NC) | March 4, 1879 | |
| 30 | Wade Hampton III (R-SC) | March 4, 1879 | |
| 31 | John A. Logan (R-IL) | March 4, 1879 | |
| 32 | Joseph E. Brown (D-GA) | May 26, 1880 | |
| 33 | James L. Pugh (D-AL) | November 24, 1880 | |
| 34 | John Sherman (R-OH) | March 4, 1881 | Previously a senator |
| 35 | Eugene Hale (R-ME) | March 4, 1881 | Former representative (10 years) |
| 36 | Joseph R. Hawley (R-CT) | March 4, 1881 | Former representative (5 years) |
| 37 | James Z. George (D-MS) | March 4, 1881 | Mississippi 18th in population (1880) |
| 38 | Arthur P. Gorman (D-MD) | March 4, 1881 | Maryland 20th in population (1880) |
| 39 | Philetus Sawyer (R-WI) | March 4, 1881 | |
| 40 | Benjamin Harrison (R-IN) | March 4, 1881 | |
| 41 | Omar D. Conger (R-MI) | March 4, 1881 | |
| 42 | John F. Miller (R-CA) | March 4, 1881 | |
| 43 | Charles Van Wyck (R-NE) | March 4, 1881 | |
| 44 | James G. Fair (D-NV) | March 4, 1881 | |
| 45 | William J. Sewell (R-NJ) | March 4, 1881 | |
| 46 | John I. Mitchell (R-PA) | March 4, 1881 | |
| 47 | William Mahone (RA-VA) | March 4, 1881 | |
| 48 | Howell E. Jackson (D-TN) | March 4, 1881 | |
| 49 | William P. Frye (R-ME) | March 18, 1881 | |
| 50 | Warner Miller (R-NY) | July 27, 1881 | |
| 51 | Nelson W. Aldrich (R-RI) | October 5, 1881 | |
| 52 | Alfred H. Colquitt (D-GA) | March 4, 1883 | |
| 53 | Shelby M. Cullom (R-IL) | March 4, 1883 | Former governor |
| 54 | James F. Wilson (R-IA) | March 4, 1883 | |
| 55 | Charles F. Manderson (R-NE) | March 4, 1883 | |
| 56 | Joseph N. Dolph (R-OR) | March 4, 1883 | |
| 57 | Randall L. Gibson (D-LA) | March 4, 1883 | |
| 58 | John E. Kenna (D-WV) | March 4, 1883 | |
| 59 | Thomas M. Bowen (R-CO) | March 4, 1883 | |
| 60 | Thomas W. Palmer (R-MI) | March 4, 1883 | |
| 61 | Dwight M. Sabin (R-MN) | March 4, 1883 | |
| 62 | Harrison H. Riddleberger (RA-VA) | March 4, 1883 | |
| 63 | Austin F. Pike (R-NH) | August 2, 1883 | |
| 64 | Jonathan Chace (R-RI) | January 20, 1885 | |
| 65 | Henry M. Teller (R-CO) | March 4, 1885 | Previously a senator |
| 66 | J. C. S. Blackburn (D-KY) | March 4, 1885 | Former representative |
| 67 | James K. Jones (D-AR) | March 4, 1885 | |
| 68 | Leland Stanford (R-CA) | March 4, 1885 | Former governor |
| 69 | William M. Evarts (R-NY) | March 4, 1885 | |
| 70 | Henry B. Payne (D-OH) | March 4, 1885 | |
| 71 | John C. Spooner (R-WI) | March 4, 1885 | |
| 72 | Ephraim K. Wilson II (D-MD) | March 4, 1885 | |
| | Henry W. Blair (R-NH) | March 5, 1885 | Former representative |
| | Edward C. Walthall (D-MS) | March 9, 1885 | |
| | George Gray (D-DE) | March 18, 1885 | |
| | James H. Berry (D-AR) | March 20, 1885 | |
| | John H. Mitchell (R-OR) | November 18, 1885 | Previously a senator |
| | George Hearst (D-CA) | March 23, 1886 | |
| | Washington C. Whitthorne (D-TN) | April 16, 1886 | |
| | Abram Williams (R-CA) | August 4, 1886 | |
| | Person C. Cheney (R-NH) | November 24, 1886 | |
| | Charles B. Farwell (R-IL) | January 19, 1887 | |

== See also ==
- 49th United States Congress
- List of United States representatives in the 49th Congress
