= Senator Stivers =

Senator Stivers may refer to:

- John D. Stivers (1861–1935), New York State Senate
- Robert Stivers (born 1961), Kentucky State Senate
- Steve Stivers (born 1965), Ohio State Senate
