= Moses D. Stivers =

American politician (1828–1895)

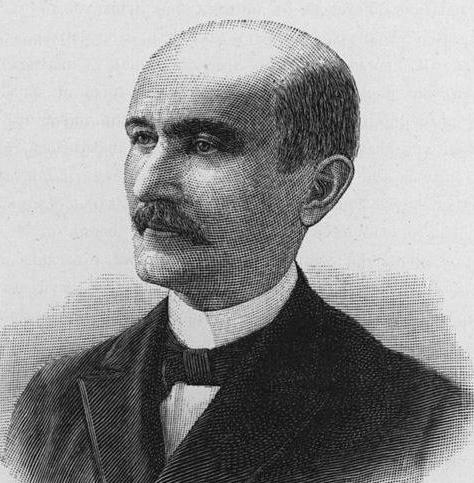

Member of the U.S. House of Representatives from New York's 15th district
- In office March 4, 1889 – March 3, 1891
- Preceded by: Henry Bacon
- Succeeded by: Henry Bacon

Clerk of Orange County, New York
- In office 1864–1867

Personal details
- Born: Moses Dunning Stivers; December 30, 1828 Beemerville, New Jersey, U.S.
- Died: February 2, 1895 (aged 66) Middletown, New York, U.S.
- Resting place: Hillside Cemetery, Middletown, New York, U.S.
- Party: Republican
- Children: John
- Occupation: Politician, businessman

Moses Dunning Stivers (December 30, 1828 – February 2, 1895) was an American businessman and politician who served one term as a U.S. Representative from New York from 1889 to 1891.

== Biography ==
Born in the Beemerville section Wantage Township, New Jersey, Stivers attended common and private schools and Mount Retirement Seminary in Wantage. He moved with his father to Ridgebury, New York, in 1845 and completed his education. He taught school.

=== Career ===
He engaged in mercantile pursuits in Ridgebury and later in Middletown from 1855 to 1864. He served as clerk of Orange County 1864-1867 and resided in Goshen, New York.

He returned to Middletown and became proprietor of the Orange County Press in 1868 and was also one of the proprietors and editors of the Middletown Daily Press. He was appointed by President Ulysses S. Grant as United States collector of internal revenue for the eleventh district of New York in 1869 and served until 1883. He served as delegate to the Republican National Convention in 1880. He engaged in banking.

=== Congress ===
He was an unsuccessful Republican candidate for election in 1884 to the Forty-ninth Congress to fill the vacancy caused by the death of Lewis Beach and for election in 1886 to the Fiftieth Congress.

Stivers was elected as a Republican to the Fifty-first Congress (March 4, 1889 – March 3, 1891). He was not a candidate for renomination in 1890.

=== Later career and death ===
He then engaged in banking.

He died in Middletown, New York, on February 2, 1895, and was interred in Hillside Cemetery.

== Family ==
- State Senator John D. Stivers (1861–1935) was his son.
- Fred Isseks, Stivers' great-great-grandson, directed the film Garbage, Gangsters, and Greed with the help of Middletown high school students, which uncovered that the mafia illegally dumped radioactive and biological waste in the area.

== Sources ==
- United States Congress. "Moses D. Stivers (id: S000930)". Biographical Directory of the United States Congress.

U.S. House of Representatives
Preceded by Henry Bacon	Member of the U.S. House of Representatives from New York's 15th congressional district 1889–1891	Succeeded by Henry Bacon
