= Archibald C. Niven =

American politician (1803–1882)

Member of the United States House of Representatives from New York's 9th congressional district
- In office March 4, 1845 – March 3, 1847
- Preceded by: James G. Clinton
- Succeeded by: Daniel B. St. John

Personal details
- Born: December 8, 1803 Newburgh, New York, U.S.
- Died: February 21, 1882 (aged 78) Monticello, New York, U.S.
- Resting place: Rock Ridge Cemetery, Monticello, New York, U.S.
- Party: Democratic
- Spouse: Jane Thompson
- Children: 3
- Profession: Attorney

Archibald Campbell Niven (December 8, 1803 – February 21, 1882) was an American politician who served one term as a U.S. representative from New York from 1845 to 1847.

== Early life ==
Niven was born in Newburgh, New York. He completed preparatory studies in Newburgh and Monticello, New York, studied law, and was admitted to the bar. He was Surrogate of Sullivan County, New York from 1828 to 1840.

== Continued career ==
A longtime member of the New York State Militia, in 1827 he was commissioned as a captain in the 10th Artillery Regiment. In 1828, he was promoted to major. Niven was appointed regimental commander with the rank of colonel. In 1837, Niven was elected commander of the 10th Artillery Brigade with the rank of brigadier general. In 1843, he was appointed to succeed Lyman Sanford as adjutant general of the state militia, and he served until 1845.

Niven was elected as a Democrat to the 29th United States Congress, holding office from March 4, 1845, to March 3, 1847.

== Later career ==
He was District Attorney of Sullivan County from 1847 to 1850; and a member of the New York State Senate (9th D.) in 1864. His election was contested by Republican Henry R. Low who was seated in place of Niven on January 17 for the session of 1865.

== Death and burial ==
Niven died in Monticello, New York, February 21, 1882. He was interred in Rock Ridge Cemetery.

== Family ==
In 1832, Niven married Jane Thompson. They were the parents of three children— Alexander T., Mary C. and Thornton A. Alexander Niven died in the sinking of SS Arctic in September 1854. Niven's brother Thornton M. Niven was a prominent architect.

== Sources ==
- United States Congress. "Archibald C. Niven (id: N000112)". Biographical Directory of the United States Congress.
- The New York Civil List compiled by Franklin Benjamin Hough, Stephen C. Hutchins and Edgar Albert Werner (1870; pg. 244, 267, 443 and 543)

U.S. House of Representatives
Preceded by James G. Clinton	Member of the U.S. House of Representatives from New York's 9th congressional district 1845-1847	Succeeded by Daniel B. St. John
New York State Senate
Preceded by Henry R. Low	New York State Senate; 9th District; 1864–1865	Succeeded by Henry R. Low
