= John D. Stivers =

American politician

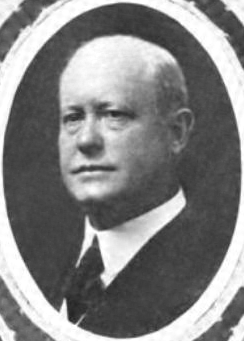

Member of the New York State Senate
- In office 1913–1918
- Constituency: 25th District

Member of the New York State Assembly
- In office 1910–1912
- Constituency: 2nd District

Personal details
- Born: John Dunning Stivers; August 30, 1861 Middletown, New York, US
- Died: February 23, 1935 (aged 73) Middletown, New York, US
- Resting place: Hillside Cemetery
- Party: Republican
- Spouse: Louise M. Greene (m. 1908)
- Children: 3
- Parents: Moses D. Stivers (father); Mary Elizabeth Stivers (mother)
- Education: Peekskill Military Academy
- Occupation: Newspaper publisher, politician

John Dunning Stivers (August 30, 1861 – February 23, 1935) was an American newspaper publisher and politician from New York.

== Life ==
John D. Stivers was born in Middletown, Orange County, New York on August 30, 1861, the son of Congressman Moses D. Stivers (1828–1895) and Mary Elizabeth (Stewart) Stivers. He graduated from Peekskill Military Academy in 1878.

On April 29, 1891, he began publishing with his brother Lewis S. Stivers a new Republican newspaper in Middletown: the Daily Times. In 1897, he was appointed as a Trustee of the Middletown State Homeopathic Hospital. On September 17, 1908, he married Louise M. Greene, and they had three children.

Stivers was a member of the New York State Assembly (Orange Co., 2nd District) in 1910, 1911 and 1912; and was Chairman of the Committee on Public Printing in 1912.

He was a member of the New York State Senate (25th District) from 1913 to 1918, sitting in the 136th, 137th, 138th, 139th, 140th and 141st New York State Legislatures.

He was found dead at his desk in his newspaper office early on the morning of February 23, 1935, in Middletown, Orange County, New York, and was buried at the Hillside Cemetery there.

New York State Assembly
Preceded by Charles A. Evans	New York State Assembly; Orange County, 2nd District; 1910–1912	Succeeded by William Thomas Doty
New York State Senate
Preceded by John B. Rose	New York State Senate; 25th District; 1913–1918	Succeeded by George T. Burling
