= Lewis Beach (politician, born 1835) =

American politician

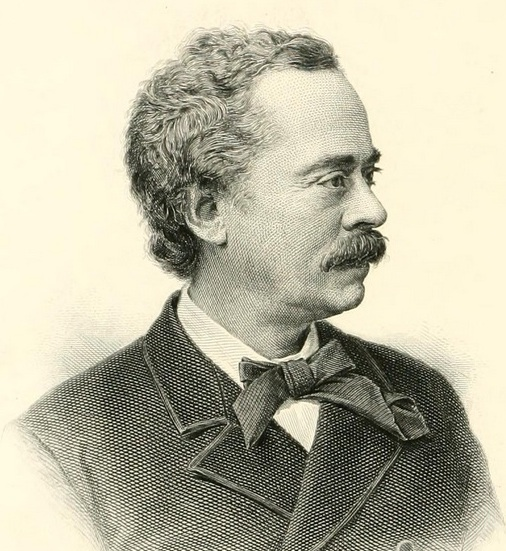

Member of the U.S. House of Representatives from New York
- In office March 4, 1881 – August 10, 1886
- Preceded by: John W. Ferdon
- Succeeded by: Henry Bacon
- Constituency: 14th district (1881–85); 15th district (1885–86)

Personal details
- Born: March 30, 1835 New York City, US
- Died: August 10, 1886 (aged 51) Cornwall, New York, US
- Resting place: Green-Wood Cemetery, Brooklyn, New York
- Party: Democratic
- Education: Yale Law School
- Profession: lawyer; politician

Lewis Beach (March 30, 1835 – August 10, 1886) was an American politician and a U.S. representative from New York representing two different congressional districts, the fourteenth and the fifteenth. In all, he served three terms in office before his death in 1886.

== Biography ==
Born in New York City, Beach graduated from Yale Law School in 1856.

Beach was admitted to the bar in 1856 and commenced practice in New York. He moved to Orange County, New York, in 1861, and served as member and treasurer of the Democratic State central committee from 1877 to 1879.

=== Congress ===
Elected as a Democrat to the Forty-seventh and Forty-eighth Congresses, Beach was a U. S. Representative for the fourteenth district of New York from March 4, 1881, to March 3, 1885. He was elected to the Forty-ninth Congress for the fifteenth district and served from March 4, 1885, until his death on August 10, 1886. He served as chairman of the Committee on Expenditures on Public Buildings during the Forty-ninth Congress.

He published a history of Cornwall, New York, in 1873.

== Death ==
Beach died, from typhoid fever and Bright's disease, at his home, "Knoll View" in Cornwall, Orange County, New York, on August 10, 1886 (age 51 years, 133 days). He is interred at Green-Wood Cemetery, Brooklyn, New York.

=== Electoral history ===
New York's 14th congressional district election, 1880
Party	Candidate	Votes	%
Democratic	Lewis Beach	16,664	49.84
Republican	Charles T. Pierson	16,134	48.25
Greenback	Addison J. Clements	590	1.76
Prohibition	Stephen Merritt	50	0.15
Total votes		18,438	100.00
Democratic gain from Republican			

New York's 14th congressional district election, 1882
Party	Candidate	Votes	%
Democratic	Lewis Beach (incumbent)	13,454	49.98
Republican	Henry R. Low	12,823	47.64
Greenback	George W. Pimm	420	1.56
Prohibition	Isaac Carey	220	0.82
Total votes		26,917	100.00
Democratic hold			

New York's 15th congressional district election, 1884
Party	Candidate	Votes	%
Democratic	Lewis Beach (incumbent)	17,728	51.68
Republican	William W. Snow	15,794	46.04
Prohibition	Gideon Hall	591	1.72
Greenback	John Law	191	0.56
Total votes		34,304	100.00
Democratic hold			

== See also ==
- List of members of the United States Congress who died in office (1790–1899)

U.S. House of Representatives
Preceded by John W. Ferdon	Member of the U.S. House of Representatives from New York's 14th congressional district March 4, 1881 – March 3, 1885	Succeeded by William G. Stahlnecker
Preceded by John H. Bagley, Jr.	Member of the U.S. House of Representatives from New York's 15th congressional district March 4, 1885 – August 10, 1886 (death)	Succeeded by Henry Bacon
