= Osmer B. Wheeler =

American politician

Osmer Beech Wheeler (February 14, 1809 Bethel, Fairfield County, Connecticut – August 11, 1906 Middletown, Orange County, New York) was an American politician from New York.

== Life ==
He was the son of Jesse Wheeler, a lawyer. Osmer B. Wheeler became a tanner, and in 1830 removed to Greene County, New York where he worked as a foreman at Zadock Pratt's tannery. In 1833, he married Rebecca Jones, and they had six children. About 1838, he removed to Sullivan County, New York, established there his own tannery in a place which lies now in the Town of Forestburgh.

Wheeler was a Know Nothing member of the New York State Senate (9th D.) in 1858 and 1859.

== Death ==
Osmer died on August 11, 1906 Middletown, Orange County, New York. He was buried at the Hillside Cemetery in Middletown.

== Sources ==
- The New York Civil List compiled by Franklin Benjamin Hough, Stephen C. Hutchins and Edgar Albert Werner (1867; pg. 442)
- Biographical Sketches of the State Officers and Members of the Legislature of the State of New York in 1859 by William D. Murray (pg. 106ff)
- Obituary Notes; OSMER B. WHEELER in NYT on August 12, 1906
- The Genealogical and Encyclopedical History of the Wheeler Family (pg. 105)

New York State Senate
Preceded by Edward M. Madden	New York State Senate; 9th District; 1858–1859	Succeeded by Robert Y. Grant
