= Henry R. Low =

American lawyer, judge, and politician (1826–1888)

- Born: September 23, 1826; Fallsburg, New York, U.S.
- Died: December 1, 1888 (aged 62); New York City, U.S.
- Resting place: Hillside Cemetery in Middletown, Orange County, New York
- Occupations: Lawyer, Judge
- Spouse: Mary C. Watkins (married 1854, died 1881)
- Children: 5

Henry R. Low (September 23, 1826 – December 1, 1888) was an American lawyer, judge and politician from New York.

== Early life ==
On September 23, 1826, Low was born in Fallsburg, New York, U.S. Low's father was John A. Low. Low's mother was Charlotte (Drake) Low (d. 1848).

== Education ==
He studied law with Archibald C. Niven in Monticello.

== Career ==
Low was admitted to the bar, and practiced law in partnership with Niven.

Low was a Judge and Surrogate of the Sullivan County Court from 1857 to 1861.

He was a member of the New York State Senate (9th D.) in 1862 and 1863. In November 1863, Low ran for re-election, but his former law partner Niven was declared elected. Low contested Niven's election, and was seated in the State Senate for the 88th Session on January 17, 1865. He was re-elected in 1865, and continued in the Senate in 1866 and 1867. Afterwards he resumed his law practice in Middletown, Orange County, New York.

In 1882, he ran for Congress in the 15th District, but was defeated by Democrat John H. Bagley Jr. Low was again a member of the State Senate (13th D.) from 1884 until his death, sitting in the 107th, 108th, 109th, 110th and 111th New York State Legislatures. He was President pro tempore during his last session.

== Personal ==
In 1854, he married Mary C. Watkins (d. 1881), daughter of State Senator John D. Watkins, and they had five children. On December 1, 1888, Low died in New York City, New York (state), of kidney disease. He was 62. Low was buried at the Hillside Cemetery in Middletown, Orange County, New York.

New York State Senate
Preceded by Robert Y. Grant	New York State Senate; 9th District; 1862–1863	Succeeded by Archibald C. Niven
Preceded by Archibald C. Niven	New York State Senate; 9th District; 1865–1867	Succeeded by William Cauldwell
Preceded by James Mackin	New York State Senate; 13th District; 1884–1888	Succeeded by Peter Ward
Political offices
Preceded by Edmund L. Pitts	President pro tempore of the New York State Senate; 1888	Succeeded by Jacob Sloat Fassett
