= Hernando Money =

American politician (1839–1912)

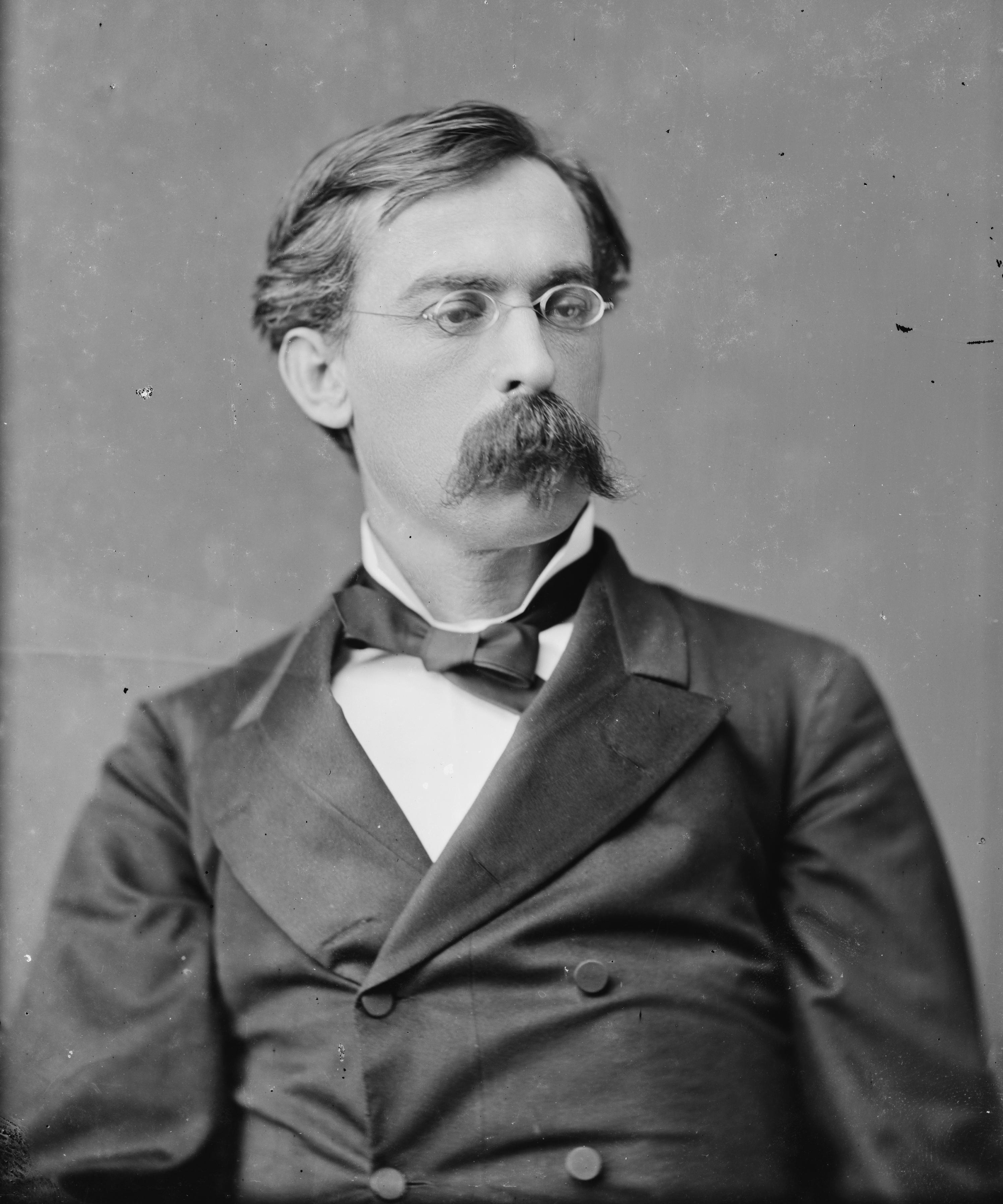
- Money, 1870–1880

Chairman of the Senate Democratic Caucus
- In office December 1909 – March 3, 1911
- Preceded by: Charles Allen Culberson
- Succeeded by: Thomas S. Martin

United States Senator from Mississippi
- In office October 8, 1897 – March 3, 1911
- Preceded by: James Z. George
- Succeeded by: John Williams

Member of the U.S. House of Representatives from Mississippi's 4th district
- In office March 4, 1893 – March 3, 1897
- Preceded by: Clarke Lewis
- Succeeded by: Andrew F. Fox
- In office March 4, 1883 – March 3, 1885
- Preceded by: Otho R. Singleton
- Succeeded by: Frederick G. Barry

Member of the U.S. House of Representatives from Mississippi's 3rd district
- In office March 4, 1875 – March 3, 1883
- Preceded by: Henry Barry
- Succeeded by: Elza Jeffords

Personal details
- Born: Hernando De Soto Money; August 26, 1839 Zeiglerville, Mississippi, U.S.
- Died: September 18, 1912 (aged 73) Biloxi, Mississippi, U.S.
- Party: Democratic
- Education: University of Mississippi, Oxford (LLB)

Hernando De Soto Money (August 26, 1839 – September 18, 1912) was an American politician from the state of Mississippi.

== Biography ==
Money was born in Holmes County, Mississippi, the son of Peirson and Triphena Money. He was named after the Spanish explorer Hernando De Soto. Early in his life, he moved with his father to Carrollton, Mississippi. He received his early education in the public schools and from a private tutor and subsequently graduated from the law department of the University of Mississippi at Oxford, where he was a member of St. Anthony Hall. He was admitted to the bar and commenced practice in Carrollton, Mississippi, about 1860. James K. Vardaman was his cousin and political ally.

As a young man he served in the Confederate army during the American Civil War. After the war, he established himself as an important planter, lawyer and newspaper editor in Mississippi. He first served in the United States House of Representatives from 1875 to 1885, as a member of the United States Democratic Party, to which he would belong for the rest of his life. He decided not to run for reelection in 1884 and established a law partnership with former assistant attorney general Alfred A. Freeman. He continued to live in the capital, Washington, D.C., until 1891, when he returned to Carrollton. He served in the United States House again from Mississippi from 1893 to 1897.

He married author Claudia Boddie, native of Jackson, Mississippi, and they had three daughters and two sons. The two younger daughters, Mabel Clare and Lillian Money, usually spent the winter in Washington with their parents. They both attended the Norwood Institute and the Berlitz School of Languages of Washington.

In 1897 he was appointed to the United States Senate from Mississippi following the death of James Z. George. He was elected to a full term in 1899 and reelected in 1905, and served in the Senate from 1897 to 1911. He was the chairman of the Committees on Corporations in the District of Columbia and expanded accommodations for the Library of Congress from 1907 to 1909. In 1903, he was one of many in opposition to the employment of African-American postal workers. He was chairman of the Democratic Caucus from 1909 to 1911, when he decided to retire from the Senate. He returned to his home near Biloxi, Mississippi, where he died one year later.

U.S. House of Representatives
Preceded by Henry Barry	Member of the U.S. House of Representatives from Mississippi's 3rd congressional district 1875–1883	Succeeded by Elza Jeffords
Preceded by Otho R. Singleton	Member of the U.S. House of Representatives from Mississippi's 4th congressional district 1883–1885	Succeeded by Frederick G. Barry
Preceded by Clarke Lewis	Member of the U.S. House of Representatives from Mississippi's 4th congressional district 1893–1897	Succeeded by Andrew F. Fox
Preceded by Alfred Moore Waddell	Chair of the House Post Committee; 1879–1881	Succeeded by Henry H. Bingham
Preceded by Henry H. Bingham	Chair of the House Post Committee; 1883–1885	Succeeded by James Henderson Blount
U.S. Senate
Preceded by James Z. George	U.S. Senator (Class 1) from Mississippi; 1897–1911; Served alongside: Edward C. Walthall, William V. Sullivan, Anselm J. McLaurin, James Gordon, LeRoy Percy	Succeeded by John Williams
Preceded by Thomas S. Martin	Chair of the Senate District of Columbia Corporations Committee; 1907–1909	Succeeded by James Taliaferro
Preceded by ???	Chair of the Senate Library Accommodations Committee; 1907–1909	Succeeded by Charles Allen Culberson
Party political offices
Preceded by Charles Allen Culberson	Chair of the Senate Democratic Caucus; 1909–1911	Succeeded by Thomas S. Martin
