= Hillside Cemetery (Middletown, New York) =

Historic cemetery in New York, United States

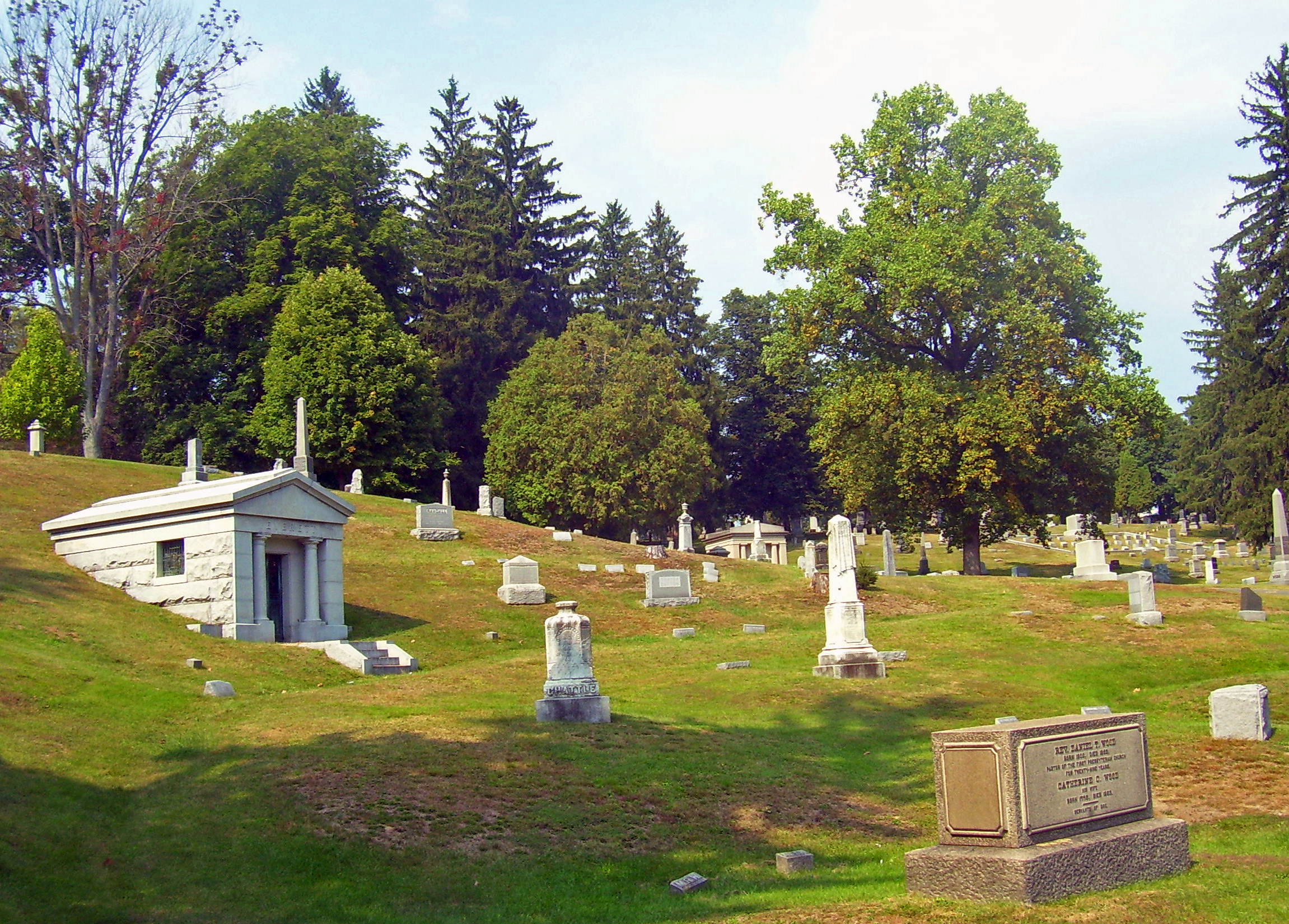
- Cemetery in 2007
- Interactive map of Hillside Cemetery

Details
- Established: 1861
- Location: Middletown, Orange County, New York
- Country: USA
- Coordinates: 41°26′32″N 74°25′52″W
- Type: Private
- Owned by: Hillside Cemetery Corporation
- Size: 52 acres (21 ha)
- Find a Grave: Hillside Cemetery
- The Political Graveyard: Hillside Cemetery
- Hillside Cemetery
- U.S. National Register of Historic Places
- Location within New York
- Location: Mulberry St., Middletown, New York
- Area: 52 acres (21 ha)
- Built: 1861
- Architect: Calvert Vaux
- NRHP reference No.: 94001027
- Added to NRHP: September 7, 1994

Hillside Cemetery is located on Mulberry Street in Middletown, New York, United States. Opened in 1861, it was designed in the rural cemetery style by Calvert Vaux and Frederick Law Olmsted, later noted for their collaboration on Central Park. There are several thousand graves, some with excellent examples of 19th-century funerary art.

Many of Middletown's prominent citizens of the late 19th century were buried there, including three Civil War winners of the Medal of Honor and one former congressman. In 1994 it was added to the National Register of Historic Places.

== Property ==
The cemetery is located in southeastern Middletown, a few blocks from the city's downtown. It is a 52-acre (21 ha) parcel built on the side of a hill. Mulberry Street is on the east, with woods to the north and west and a residential neighborhood on the north.

It is built into a hillside that rises sharply to the north. The slope is cut into a series of undulating bluffs to accommodate the graves and curving roads around the cemetery. There is a pond near the upper end of the property and the remains of a second at the lower end. A tributary of Monhagen Brook runs across the property from the northwest to the east. There are groves of mature shade trees.

At the front gate is a Gothic Revival stone office building. It is a contributing resource to the National Register listing, but is no longer used. Instead most administrative functions are handled at a more modern maintenance garage. Scattered throughout the cemetery are various mausolea and other memorials.

== History ==
New York provided for the creation of rural cemeteries, which followed the model of Mount Auburn Cemetery in Massachusetts by setting graves and monuments in a pastoral natural setting, in 1847. Under that act, the Hillside Cemetery Association was formed in 1860. Later that year it purchased 50 acres (200,000 m^{2}) of farmland in Middletown, which had only recently incorporated as a village, for its cemetery.

Calvert Vaux and Frederick Law Olmsted were hired to design the landscape soon afterwards. An English immigrant, Vaux had worked for Andrew Jackson Downing of Newburgh, whose ideas about a more naturally sympathetic architecture guided much home construction in mid-19th century America. Two years earlier, Vaux and Olmsted, another Downing disciple, had won New York City's design competition to create Central Park. This fame followed Vaux to Middletown when he began work on the cemetery the next year.

It was consecrated on August 8, 1861. Vaux's Picturesque plan was followed exactly, but a planned observation tower was never built. The new cemetery soon gained a representative collection of contemporary funerary art. Monuments and memorials showed the influence of the Egyptian Revival and the sarcophagus of Scipio Barbatus. Decorative motifs such as garlands, angels and urns. Many headstones have carved female figures, symbolizing different things depending on what she holds. Two monuments have carved granite statues of Hope.

In 1930 the stone office building at the front entrance was built. It fell into disuse after three decades, and thus the modern garage was built in 1992. Vaux's lower pond has also been mostly drained.

== Notable burials ==
- Thomas D. Collins, 1847–1935. While serving as a sergeant in Company H, 143rd New York Volunteer Infantry, captured a Confederate regimental flag on May 15, 1864, during the Battle of Resaca. Awarded the Medal of Honor.
- David Porter Dewitt, 1817–1889. Brevet brigadier general in Union Army.
- Nathan Mullock Hallock, 1844–1903. While serving as a private in Company K of the 124th New York Volunteer Infantry Regiment at Bristoe Station on October 14, 1863, he "at imminent peril saved from death or capture a disabled officer of his company by carrying him under a hot musketry fire, to a place of safety", for which he was awarded the Medal of Honor in 1897.
- Moses D. Stivers, 1828–1895. Served one term as U.S. Representative, from 1889–91.
- Lewis Wisner, 1841–1906. First lieutenant in Company K, "while serving as an engineer officer voluntarily exposed himself to the enemy's fire" at the Battle of Spotsylvania Court House on May 12, 1864. Awarded the Medal of Honor.

== See also ==
- National Register of Historic Places listings in Orange County, New York
