= Peter Ward (New York politician) =

New York politician (1827–1891)

Member of the New York State Senate from the 13th district
- In office February 11, 1889 – December 31, 1889
- Preceded by: Henry R. Low
- Succeeded by: William P. Richardson

Mayor of Newburgh, New York
- In office March 13, 1882 – March 11, 1884

Personal details
- Born: September 30, 1827 Ramapo, New York, U.S.
- Died: May 10, 1891 (aged 63) Newburgh, New York, U.S.
- Party: Democratic
- Occupation: Businessman

Peter Ward (September 30, 1827 – May 10, 1891) was a New York businessman and politician. From 1851–1859, Ward was the superintendent of the Newburgh Branch of the Erie Railroad. He also worked for the New York, Ontario and Western Railway and the New Jersey Southern Railroad. A member of the Democratic Party, he served as the mayor of Newburgh, New York, from March 13, 1882, to March 11, 1884. In 1889, Ward was elected in a special election to represent the 13th district in the New York State Senate following the death of Senator Henry R. Low. He was sworn in on February 11, 1889, and served until the completion of the 112th New York State Legislature on December 31, 1889. Ward died on May 10, 1891, aged 63, just months after having his tongue removed in surgery.

New York State Senate
Preceded by Henry R. Low	Senator for the 13th District; 1889	Succeeded by William P. Richardson
