= Clarke Lewis =

American politician (1840–1896)

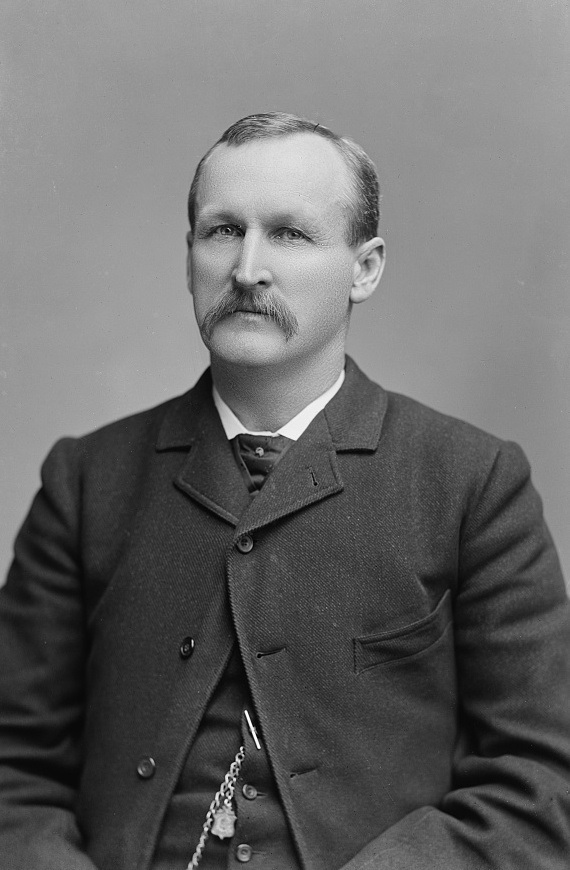

Member of the U.S. House of Representatives from Mississippi's 4th district
- In office March 4, 1889 – March 3, 1893
- Preceded by: Frederick G. Barry
- Succeeded by: Hernando D. Money

Member of the Mississippi House of Representatives
- In office 1878

Personal details
- Born: November 8, 1840 Huntsville, Alabama
- Died: March 13, 1896 (aged 55) Macon, Mississippi
- Resting place: Odd Fellows Cemetery, Macon, Mississippi
- Party: Democratic
- Spouse: Hattie E. Spann

Military service
- Allegiance: Confederate States of America
- Branch/service: Confederate States Army
- Rank: Lieutenant
- Battles/wars: American Civil War: Siege of Fort Morgan

Clarke Lewis (November 8, 1840 – March 13, 1896) was an American educator, Civil War veteran, and politician who served two terms as a United States representative from Mississippi from 1889 to 1893.

== Biography ==
He was born in Huntsville, Alabama. He moved with his mother to Noxubee County, Mississippi in 1844 where he attended the district schools and Somerville Institute and also engaged in teaching for several years.

=== Civil War ===
Lewis entered the Confederate Army in February 1861 and served until the close of the American Civil War.

=== Early career ===
After the war, he resumed teaching in 1865. He was also employed as a clerk in a store in 1866 and 1867 and engaged in mercantile and agricultural pursuits 1867–1879.

=== Congress ===
Lewis was a member of the Mississippi House of Representatives in 1878. He was elected as a Democrat to the Fifty-first and Fifty-second Congresses (March 4, 1889 – March 3, 1893).

=== Later career and death ===
After leaving Congress, he resumed agricultural pursuits. He died near Macon, Mississippi in 1896 and was buried in the Odd Fellows Cemetery, Macon, Mississippi.

== Notes ==
U.S. House of Representatives
Preceded by Frederick G. Barry	Member of the U.S. House of Representatives from Mississippi's 4th congressional district 1889–1893	Succeeded by Hernando D. Money
