= Robert Y. Grant =

American politician

Robert Y. Grant (November 22, 1819 in Liberty, New York – February 19, 1862) was an American politician from New York.

== Life ==
He was the son of Joseph Grant and Susan (Young) Grant. He became a farmer, then dealt in cattle, and about 1851 engaged in the tanning business. On September 4, 1839, he married Sarah Smedes, and they had four children, among them Lt. Oscar B. Grant USMC (1840–1920).

He was a Justice of the Peace from 1849 to 1855; Supervisor of the Town of Liberty in 1854 and 1859; Postmaster of Liberty from 1855; and a member of the New York State Senate (9th D.) in 1860 and 1861.

He died from typhoid fever, and was buried at the Liberty Cemetery.

== Sources ==
- The New York Civil List compiled by Franklin Benjamin Hough, Stephen C. Hutchins and Edgar Albert Werner (1867; pg. 442)
- Biographical Sketches of the State Officers and Members of the Legislature of the State of New York by William D. Murphy (1861; pg. 59ff)
- Tanning Industry in Sullivan County
- Post Office Directory (1856; pg. 122)

New York State Senate
Preceded by Osmer B. Wheeler	New York State Senate; 9th District; 1860–1861	Succeeded by Henry R. Low
