= William G. Stahlnecker =

American politician (1849–1902)

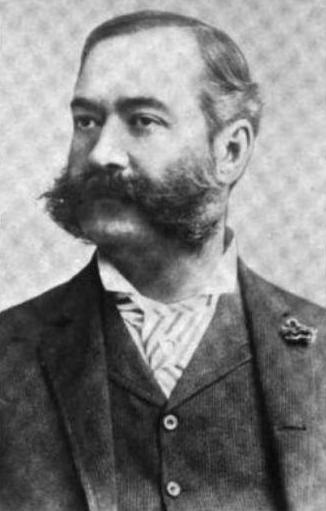

Member of the U.S. House of Representatives from New York's 14th district
- In office March 4, 1885 – March 3, 1893
- Preceded by: Lewis Beach
- Succeeded by: John R. Fellows

15th Mayor of Yonkers
- In office 1884–1886
- Preceded by: Samuel G. Swift
- Succeeded by: J. Harvey Bell

Personal details
- Born: William Griggs Stahlnecker; June 20, 1849 Auburn, New York, U.S.
- Died: March 26, 1902 (aged 52) Yonkers, New York, U.S.
- Resting place: Sleepy Hollow Cemetery, Tarrytown, New York, U.S.
- Party: Democratic
- Education: New York University
- Profession: Politician, lawyer

William Griggs Stahlnecker (June 20, 1849 – March 26, 1902) was an American lawyer and politician who served four terms as a U.S. representative from New York from 1885 to 1893.

== Biography ==
Born in Auburn, New York, Stahlnecker moved with his parents to Brooklyn and later to New York City. He pursued an academic course and attended New York University in New York City. He studied law. He was admitted to practice. He engaged in mercantile pursuits. He served as member of the New York Produce Exchange. He moved to Yonkers in 1880.

=== Political career ===
He served as mayor of Yonkers, New York from 1884 to 1886. He served as delegate to the Democratic State convention at Saratoga in June 1884. He served as delegate to the Democratic National Convention in 1884.

==== Congress ====
Stahlnecker was elected as a Democrat to the Forty-ninth and to the three succeeding Congresses (March 4, 1885 – March 3, 1893).

=== Later career and death ===
He engaged in the practice of law.

He died in Yonkers, New York, March 26, 1902. He was interred in Sleepy Hollow Cemetery, Tarrytown, New York.

== Sources ==
- United States Congress. "William G. Stahlnecker (id: S000781)". Biographical Directory of the United States Congress.

U.S. House of Representatives
Preceded by Lewis Beach	Member of the U.S. House of Representatives from New York's 14th congressional district 1885–1893	Succeeded by John R. Fellows
