= Henry Bacon (New York politician) =

American politician

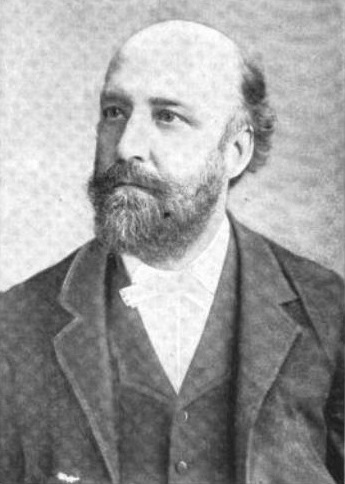

Member of the U.S. House of Representatives from New York's 15th district
- In office March 4, 1891 – March 3, 1893
- Preceded by: Moses D. Stivers
- Succeeded by: Ashbel P. Fitch
- In office December 6, 1886 – March 3, 1889
- Preceded by: Lewis Beach
- Succeeded by: Moses D. Stivers

Personal details
- Born: March 14, 1846 Brooklyn, New York
- Died: March 25, 1915 (aged 69) Goshen, New York
- Resting place: Slate Hill Cemetery, Goshen, New York
- Party: Democratic
- Spouse(s): Helen Brandreth (m. 1867–1905, her death); Susan Randall (m. 1906– 1915, his death)
- Children: 1
- Education: Union College
- Profession: Attorney

Henry Bacon (March 14, 1846 – March 25, 1915) was an American lawyer and politician who served as a U.S. representative from New York in the late 19th century.

== Biography ==
Born in Brooklyn, New York, Bacon was the son of Daniel P. Bacon and attended the Mount Pleasant Academy in Sing Sing and the Episcopal Academy in Cheshire, Connecticut. He was graduated from Union College in 1865; studied law, and was admitted to the bar in 1866. He commenced practice in Goshen, New York.

== Career ==
Bacon was elected as a Democrat to the Forty-ninth Congress to fill the vacancy caused by the death of Lewis Beach as Representative of the fifteenth district of New York. He was reelected to the Fiftieth Congress and served from December 6, 1886, until March 3, 1889. During the Fiftieth Congress, he was chairman of the Committee on Manufactures. He was an unsuccessful candidate for reelection in 1888 to the Fifty-first Congress. He was elected to the Fifty-second Congress from March 4, 1891, to March 3, 1893, during which he served as chairman of the Committee on Banking and Currency.

An unsuccessful candidate for renomination in 1892, he resumed the practice of law in Goshen. He served as delegate to the Democratic National Convention at Chicago in 1892 and was the Corporation Counsel of Goshen from 1909 to 1915.

== Death ==
Bacon died of pneumonia on March 25, 1915, in Goshen, New York. He is buried in Slate Hill Cemetery in Goshen.

== Family ==
In 1867, Bacon married Helen Brandreth, the daughter of George Brandreth and they remained married until her death in 1905. In 1906, he married Susan Randall, the daughter of Samuel J. Randall, and they were married until his death. With his first wife, Bacon was the father of a daughter, Florence, who was the wife of Brandreth Symonds.

U.S. House of Representatives
Preceded by Lewis Beach	Member of the U.S. House of Representatives from New York's 15th congressional district December 6, 1886 – March 3, 1889	Succeeded by Moses D. Stivers
Preceded by Moses D. Stivers	Member of the U.S. House of Representatives from New York's 15th congressional district March 4, 1891 – March 3, 1893	Succeeded by Ashbel P. Fitch
