= United States House Committee on Post Office and Post Roads =

United States congressional committee

The United States House Committee on Post Office and Post Roads was a congressional committee that existed until 1946. A Select Committee on the Post Office and Post Roads was established in 1806 and made a standing committee in 1808 during the 10th Congress. The early membership of the committee consisted of one Member from each state.

The jurisdiction of the committee extended to all proposed legislation relating to the carrying of the mails, both foreign and domestic. It included the determination of the location, construction, and maintenance of post offices and post roads; the acquisition, lease, or transfer of realty or facilities for postal purposes; and certain aspects of the employment and management of postal employees, such as the pay and leave of letter carriers, and the settlement of claims brought by employees or contractors. It included the regulation of the Postal Service, including postal rates, the franking privilege, and the printing of stamped envelopes. At various times the Railway Mail Service, ocean mail service, pneumatic tube service, postal savings banks, postal telegraphy, the Air Mail Service, and Rural Free Delivery were included in its jurisdiction.

As part of its responsibility the committee investigated the management of postal facilities, contracts for carrying the mail, and other subjects such as the forgery of postal money orders.

In 1885 the jurisdiction of the committee was expanded to include appropriation authority. The committee prepared Post Office appropriations bills from that time until 1920 when the authority was revoked under a rule change. The committee functioned until 1946 (the 79th Congress) when its jurisdiction was included in that of the new House Committee on Post Office and Civil Service.

== Chairmen ==
Chair	Party	State	Start of Service	End of Service
John Rhea	Democratic-Republican	Tennessee	1807	1815
Samuel D. Ingham	Democratic-Republican	Pennsylvania	1815	1818
Arthur Livermore	Democratic-Republican	New Hampshire	1818	1821
Francis Johnson	Democratic-Republican	Kentucky	1821	1823
John Telemachus Johnson	Democratic-Republican	Kentucky	1823	1825
Samuel D. Ingham	Jacksonian	Pennsylvania	1825	1828
Samuel McKean	Jacksonian	Pennsylvania	1828	1829
Richard Mentor Johnson	Jacksonian	Kentucky	1829	1832
Henry William Connor	Jacksonian	North Carolina	1832	1839
James Iver McKay	Democratic	North Carolina	1839	1841
George N. Briggs	Whig	Massachusetts	1841	1843
George Washington Hopkins	Democratic	Virginia	1843	1847
William L. Goggin	Whig	Virginia	1847	1849
Emery D. Potter	Democratic	Ohio	1849	1851
Edson B. Olds	Democratic	Ohio	1851	1855
Daniel Mace	Opposition	Indiana	1855	1857
William Hayden English	Democratic	Indiana	1857	1859
Schuyler Colfax	Republican	Indiana	1859	1863
John B. Alley	Republican	Massachusetts	1863	1867
John F. Farnsworth	Republican	Illinois	1867	1873
John Black Packer	Republican	Pennsylvania	1873	1875
John Bullock Clark Jr.	Democratic	Missouri	1875	1877
Alfred Moore Waddell	Democratic	North Carolina	1877	1879
Hernando Money	Democratic	Mississippi	1879	1881
Henry H. Bingham	Republican	Pennsylvania	1881	1883
Hernando Money	Democratic	Mississippi	1883	1885
James Henderson Blount	Democratic	Georgia	1885	1889
Henry H. Bingham	Republican	Pennsylvania	1889	1891
John S. Henderson	Democratic	North Carolina	1891	1895
Eugene F. Loud	Republican	California	1895	1903
Jesse Overstreet	Republican	Indiana	1903	1909
John W. Weeks	Republican	Massachusetts	1909	1911
John A. Moon	Democratic	Tennessee	1911	1919
Halvor Steenerson	Republican	Minnesota	1919	1923
William Walton Griest	Republican	Pennsylvania	1923	1929
Archie D. Sanders	Republican	New York	1929	1931
James M. Mead	Democratic	New York	1931	1938
Milton A. Romjue	Democratic	Missouri	1939	1943
Thomas G. Burch	Democratic	Virginia	1943	1946
George D. O'Brien	Democratic	Michigan	1946	1947
