= 49th United States Congress =

Meeting of the legislative branch of the United States (1885–1887)

←	48th	50th	→
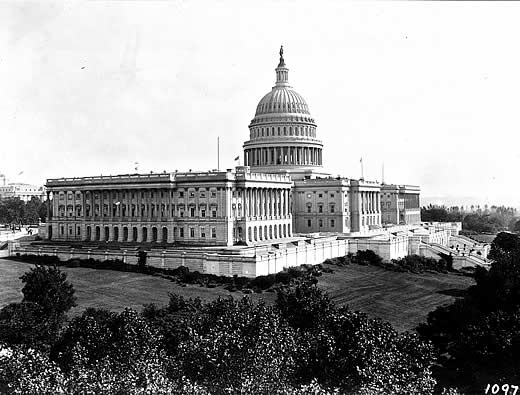
- United States Capitol (1906)

Overview
- Legislative body: United States Congress
- Jurisdiction: United States
- Term: March 4, 1885 – March 4, 1887

Senate
- Members: 76
- President: Thomas A. Hendricks (D) (until November 25, 1885); Vacant (from November 25, 1885)
- President pro tempore: John Sherman (R); John Ingalls (R)
- Party control: Republican (through caucus)

House of Representatives
- Members: 325 representatives 8 non-voting delegates
- Speaker: John Carlisle (D)
- Party control: Democratic

Sessions
- Special (Note: Special session of the Senate.): March 4, 1885 – April 2, 1885
- 1st: December 7, 1885 – August 5, 1886
- 2nd: December 6, 1886 – March 3, 1887

The 49th United States Congress was a meeting of the legislative branch of the United States federal government, consisting of the United States Senate and the United States House of Representatives. It met in Washington, D.C., from March 4, 1885, to March 4, 1887, during the first two years of Grover Cleveland's first presidency. The apportionment of seats in the House of Representatives was based on the 1880 United States census. The Senate had a Republican majority, and the House had a Democratic majority.

== Major events ==
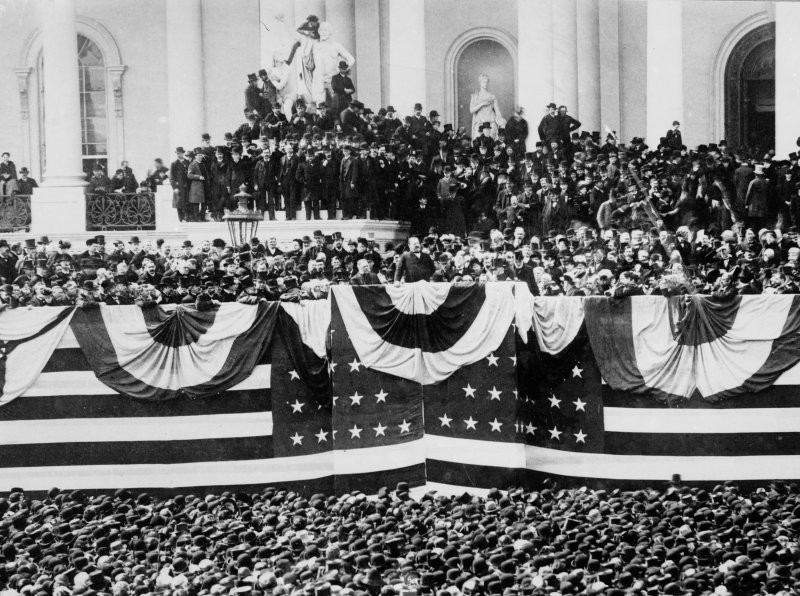
First presidential inauguration of Grover Cleveland, March 4, 1885, on the East Portico of the U.S. Capitol. "Fellow-Citizens: In the presence of this vast assemblage of my countrymen I am about to supplement and seal by the oath which I shall take the manifestation of the will of a great and free people...."

- March 4, 1885: Grover Cleveland became President of the United States
- November 25, 1885: Vice President Thomas A. Hendricks died

== Major legislation ==
- January 19, 1886: Presidential Succession Act of 1886, ch. 4, 24 Stat. 1
- February 3, 1887: Electoral Count Act, ch. 90, 24 Stat. 373
- February 4, 1887: Interstate Commerce Act, ch. 104, 24 Stat. 379
- February 8, 1887: Indian General Allotment Act ("Dawes Act"), ch. 119, 24 Stat. 388
- March 2, 1887: Agricultural Experiment Stations Act of 1887
- March 2, 1887: Hatch Act of 1887, ch. 314, 24 Stat. 440
- March 3, 1887: Tucker Act, ch. 359, 24 Stat. 505
- March 3, 1887: Edmunds–Tucker Act, ch. 397 24 Stat. 635

== Party summary ==
The count below identifies party affiliations at the beginning of the first session of this Congress, and includes members from vacancies and newly admitted states, when they were first seated. Changes resulting from subsequent replacements are shown below in the "Changes in membership" section.

=== Senate ===
	Party (shading shows control)			Total	Vacant
	Democratic (D)	Readjuster (RA)	Republican (R)	Total	Vacant
End of previous congress	36	2	38	76	0
Begin	34	2	37	73	3
End	34	2	40	76	0
Final voting share	44.7%	2.6%	52.6%		
Beginning of next congress	36	1	38	75	1

=== House of Representatives ===
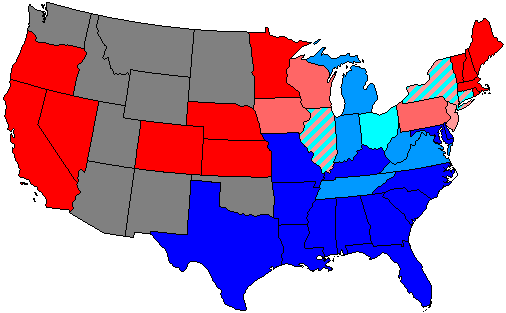
House seats by party holding plurality in state: 80+% to 100% Democratic / 80+% to 100% Republican; 60+% to 80% Democratic / 60+% to 80% Republican; Up to 60% Democratic / Up to 60% Republican

	Party (shading shows control)					Total	Vacant
	Democratic (D)	Readjuster (RA)	Greenback (GB)	Republican (R)	Other	Total	Vacant
End of previous congress	197	4	2	113	7 (Note: Independent, Independent Democratic, Independent Republican, and Anti-Monopoly)	323	2
Begin	181	1	1	140	0	323	2
End	180	1	1	138	0	320	5
Final voting share	56.3%	0.3%	0.3%	43.1%	0.0%		
Beginning of next congress	168	0	1	150	5	324	1

== Leadership ==
=== Senate ===
- President: Thomas A. Hendricks (D), until November 25, 1885; vacant thereafter
- President pro tempore: John Sherman (R), December 7, 1885 – February 26, 1887
  - John J. Ingalls (R), from February 26, 1887
- Republican Conference Chairman: George F. Edmunds
- Democratic Caucus Chairman: James B. Beck
- Democratic Campaign Committee Chairman: Arthur Pue Gorman

=== House of Representatives ===
- Speaker: John G. Carlisle (D)
- Minority Leader: Thomas B. Reed
- Democratic Caucus Chairman: John Randolph Tucker
- Republican Conference Chairman: Joseph Gurney Cannon

== Members ==
=== Senate ===
Senators were elected by the state legislatures every two years, with one-third beginning new six-year terms with each Congress. Preceding the names in the list below are Senate class numbers, which indicate the cycle of their election. In this Congress, Class 1 meant their term ended with this Congress, requiring reelection in 1886; Class 2 meant their term began in the last Congress, requiring reelection in 1888; and Class 3 meant their term began in this Congress, requiring reelection in 1890.

==== Alabama ====
▌2. John T. Morgan (D)
▌3. James L. Pugh (D)

==== Arkansas ====
▌2. Augustus H. Garland (D), until March 6, 1885

▌James H. Berry (D), from March 20, 1885

▌3. James K. Jones (D)

==== California ====
▌1. John F. Miller (R), until March 8, 1886

▌George Hearst (D), March 23 – August 4, 1886
▌Abram P. Williams (R), from August 4, 1886

▌3. Leland Stanford (R)

==== Colorado ====
▌2. Thomas M. Bowen (R)
▌3. Henry M. Teller (R)

==== Connecticut ====
▌1. Joseph R. Hawley (R)
▌3. Orville H. Platt (R)

==== Delaware ====
▌1. Thomas F. Bayard (D), until March 6, 1885

▌George Gray (D), from March 18, 1885

▌2. Eli Saulsbury (D)

==== Florida ====
▌1. Charles W. Jones (D)
▌3. Wilkinson Call (D)

==== Georgia ====
▌2. Alfred H. Colquitt (D)
▌3. Joseph E. Brown (D)

==== Illinois ====
▌2. Shelby M. Cullom (R)
▌3. John A. Logan (R), May 19, 1885 – December 26, 1886

▌Charles B. Farwell (R), from January 19, 1887

==== Indiana ====
▌1. Benjamin Harrison (R)
▌3. Daniel W. Voorhees (D)

==== Iowa ====
▌2. James F. Wilson (R)
▌3. William B. Allison (R)

==== Kansas ====
▌2. Preston B. Plumb (R)
▌3. John J. Ingalls (R)

==== Kentucky ====
▌2. James B. Beck (D)
▌3. Joseph C. S. Blackburn (D)

==== Louisiana ====
▌2. Randall L. Gibson (D)
▌3. James B. Eustis (D)

==== Maine ====
▌1. Eugene Hale (R)
▌2. William P. Frye (R)

==== Maryland ====
▌1. Arthur Pue Gorman (D)
▌3. Ephraim K. Wilson II (D)

==== Massachusetts ====
▌1. Henry L. Dawes (R)
▌2. George F. Hoar (R)

==== Michigan ====
▌1. Omar D. Conger (R)
▌2. Thomas W. Palmer (R)

==== Minnesota ====
▌1. Samuel J. R. McMillan (R)
▌2. Dwight M. Sabin (R)

==== Mississippi ====
▌1. James Z. George (D)
▌2. Lucius Q. C. Lamar (D), until March 6, 1885

▌Edward C. Walthall (D), from March 9, 1885

==== Missouri ====
▌1. Francis Cockrell (D)
▌3. George G. Vest (D)

==== Nebraska ====
▌1. Charles H. Van Wyck (R)
▌2. Charles F. Manderson (R)

==== Nevada ====
▌1. James G. Fair (D)
▌3. John P. Jones (R)

==== New Hampshire ====
▌2. Austin F. Pike (R), until October 8, 1886

▌Person C. Cheney (R), from November 24, 1886

▌3. Henry W. Blair (R), from March 5, 1885

==== New Jersey ====
▌1. William J. Sewell (R)
▌2. John R. McPherson (D)

==== New York ====
▌1. Warner Miller (R)
▌3. William M. Evarts (R)

==== North Carolina ====
▌2. Matt W. Ransom (D)
▌3. Zebulon B. Vance (D)

==== Ohio ====
▌1. John Sherman (R)
▌3. Henry B. Payne (D)

==== Oregon ====
▌2. Joseph N. Dolph (R)
▌3. John H. Mitchell (R), from November 18, 1885

==== Pennsylvania ====
▌1. John I. Mitchell (R)
▌3. J. Donald Cameron (R)

==== Rhode Island ====
▌1. Nelson W. Aldrich (R)
▌2. Jonathan Chace (R)

==== South Carolina ====
▌2. Matthew C. Butler (D)
▌3. Wade Hampton III (D)

==== Tennessee ====
▌1. Howell E. Jackson (D), until April 14, 1886

▌Washington C. Whitthorne (D), from April 16, 1886

▌2. Isham G. Harris (D)

==== Texas ====
▌1. Samuel B. Maxey (D)
▌2. Richard Coke (D)

==== Vermont ====
▌1. George F. Edmunds (R)
▌3. Justin S. Morrill (R)

==== Virginia ====
▌1. William Mahone (RA)
▌2. Harrison H. Riddleberger (RA)

==== West Virginia ====
▌1. Johnson N. Camden (D)
▌2. John E. Kenna (D)

==== Wisconsin ====
▌1. Philetus Sawyer (R)
▌3. John C. Spooner (R)

Senators' party membership by state at the opening of the 49th Congress in March 1885. 2 Democrats 1 Democrat and 1 Republican 2 Republicans 2 Readjusters Territories

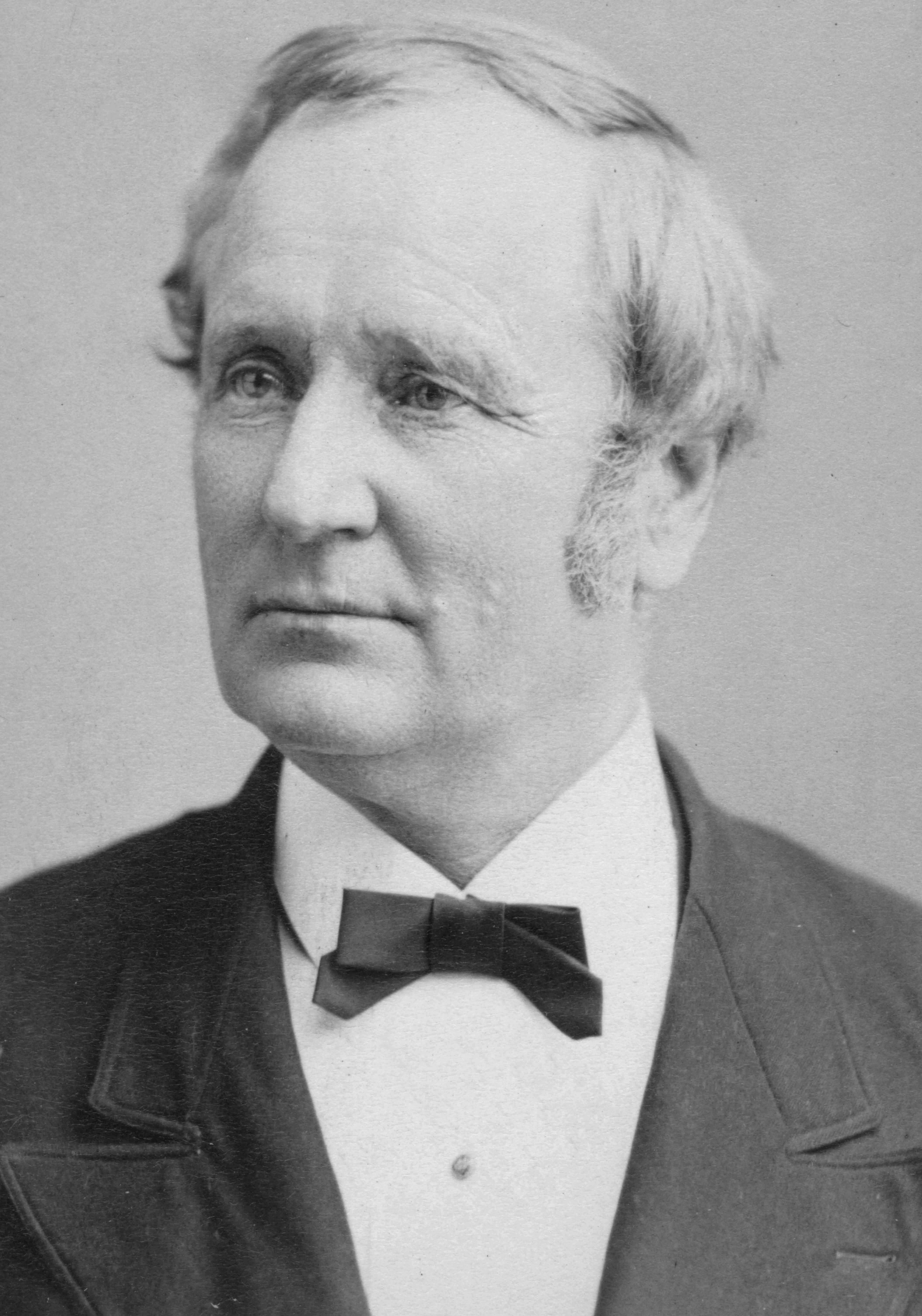
Senate President Thomas A. Hendricks

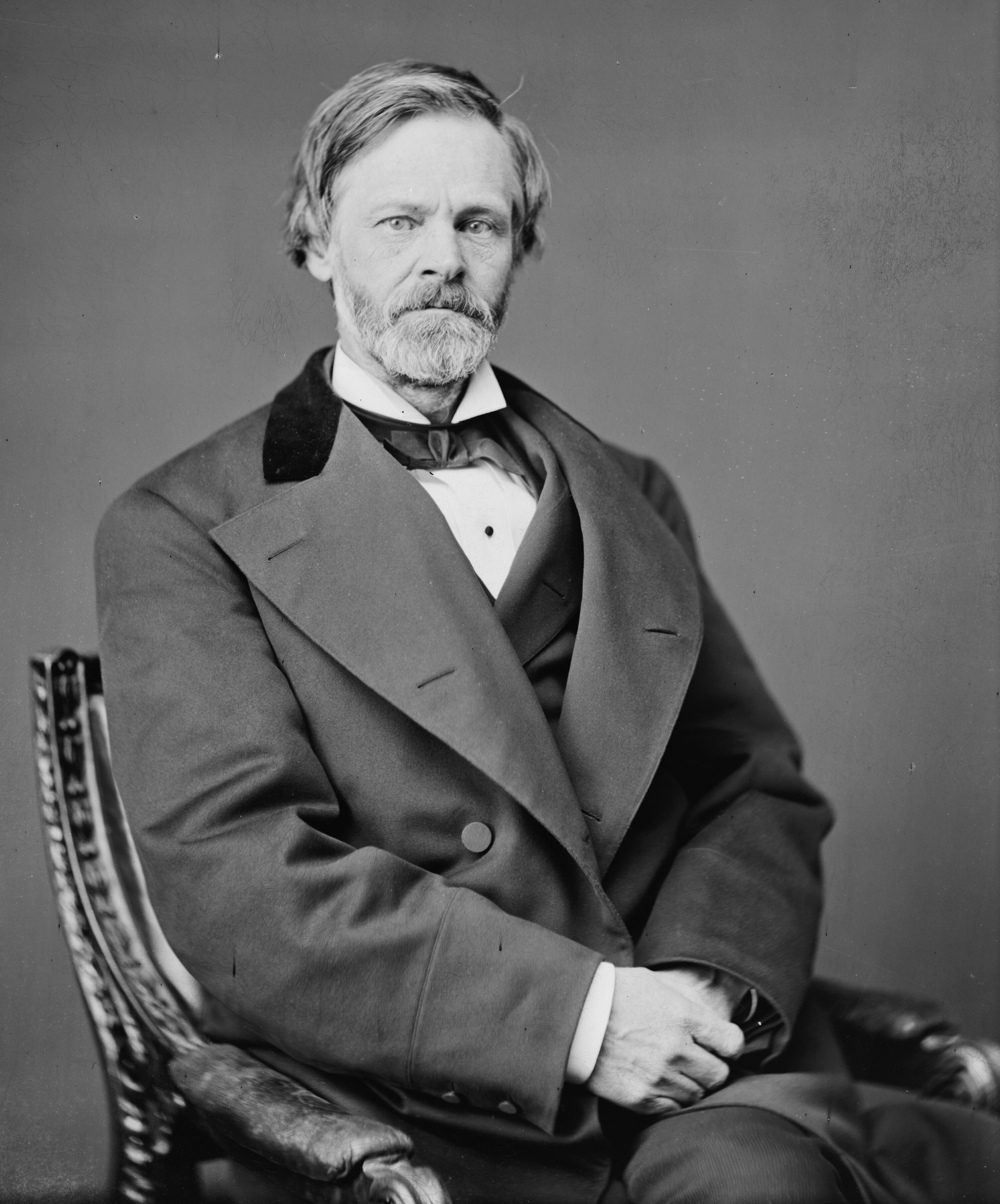
Senate President pro tempore John Sherman

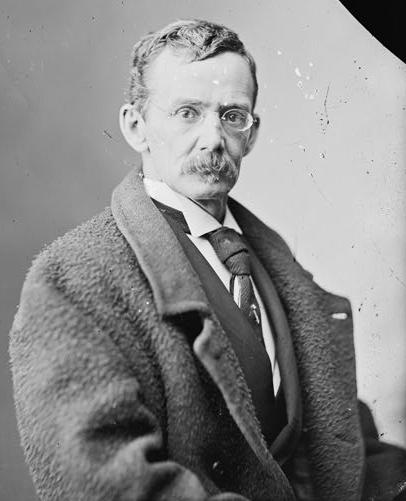
Senate President pro tempore John J. Ingalls

=== House of Representatives ===
The names of representatives are listed by district.

==== Alabama ====
▌1. James T. Jones (D)
▌2. Hilary A. Herbert (D)
▌3. William C. Oates (D)
▌4. Alexander C. Davidson (D)
▌5. Thomas W. Sadler (D)
▌6. John M. Martin (D)
▌7. William H. Forney (D)
▌8. Joseph Wheeler (D)

==== Arkansas ====
▌1. Poindexter Dunn (D)
▌2. Clifton R. Breckinridge (D)
▌3. Thomas C. McRae (D), from December 7, 1885
▌4. John H. Rogers (D)
▌5. Samuel W. Peel (D)

==== California ====
▌1. Barclay Henley (D)
▌2. James A. Louttit (R)
▌3. Joseph McKenna (R)
▌4. William W. Morrow (R)
▌5. Charles N. Felton (R)
▌6. Henry H. Markham (R)

==== Colorado ====
▌At-large. George G. Symes (R)

==== Connecticut ====
▌1. John R. Buck (R)
▌2. Charles L. Mitchell (D)
▌3. John T. Wait (R)
▌4. Edward W. Seymour (D)

==== Delaware ====
▌At-large. Charles B. Lore (D)

==== Florida ====
▌1. Robert H. M. Davidson (D)
▌2. Charles Dougherty (D)

==== Georgia ====
▌1. Thomas M. Norwood (D)
▌2. Henry G. Turner (D)
▌3. Charles F. Crisp (D)
▌4. Henry R. Harris (D)
▌5. Nathaniel J. Hammond (D)
▌6. James H. Blount (D)
▌7. Judson C. Clements (D)
▌8. Seaborn Reese (D)
▌9. Allen D. Candler (D)
▌10. George T. Barnes (D)

==== Illinois ====
▌1. Ransom W. Dunham (R)
▌2. Frank Lawler (D)
▌3. James H. Ward (D)
▌4. George E. Adams (R)
▌5. Reuben Ellwood (R), until July 1, 1885

▌Albert J. Hopkins (R), from December 7, 1885

▌6. Robert R. Hitt (R)
▌7. Thomas J. Henderson (R)
▌8. Ralph Plumb (R)
▌9. Lewis E. Payson (R)
▌10. Nicholas E. Worthington (D)
▌11. William H. Neece (D)
▌12. James M. Riggs (D)
▌13. William M. Springer (D)
▌14. Jonathan H. Rowell (R)
▌15. Joseph G. Cannon (R)
▌16. Silas Z. Landes (D)
▌17. John R. Eden (D)
▌18. William R. Morrison (D)
▌19. Richard W. Townshend (D)
▌20. John R. Thomas (R)

==== Indiana ====
▌1. John J. Kleiner (D)
▌2. Thomas R. Cobb (D)
▌3. Jonas G. Howard (D)
▌4. William S. Holman (D)
▌5. Courtland C. Matson (D)
▌6. Thomas M. Browne (R)
▌7. William D. Bynum (D)
▌8. James T. Johnston (R)
▌9. Thomas B. Ward (D)
▌10. William D. Owen (R)
▌11. George W. Steele (R)
▌12. Robert Lowry (D)
▌13. George Ford (D)

==== Iowa ====
▌1. Benton J. Hall (D)
▌2. Jeremiah H. Murphy (D)
▌3. David B. Henderson (R)
▌4. William E. Fuller (R)
▌5. Benjamin T. Frederick (D)
▌6. James B. Weaver (GB)
▌7. Edwin H. Conger (R)
▌8. William P. Hepburn (R)
▌9. Joseph Lyman (R)
▌10. Adoniram J. Holmes (R)
▌11. Isaac S. Struble (R)

==== Kansas ====
▌1. Edmund N. Morrill (R)
▌2. Edward H. Funston (R)
▌3. Bishop W. Perkins (R)
▌4. Thomas Ryan (R)
▌5. John A. Anderson (R)
▌6. Lewis Hanback (R)
▌7. Samuel R. Peters (R)

==== Kentucky ====
▌1. William J. Stone (D)
▌2. Polk Laffoon (D)
▌3. John E. Halsell (D)
▌4. Thomas A. Robertson (D)
▌5. Albert S. Willis (D)
▌6. John G. Carlisle (D)
▌7. William C. P. Breckinridge (D)
▌8. James B. McCreary (D)
▌9. William H. Wadsworth (R)
▌10. William P. Taulbee (D)
▌11. Frank L. Wolford (D)

==== Louisiana ====
▌1. Louis St. Martin (D)
▌2. Michael Hahn (R), until March 15, 1886

▌Nathaniel D. Wallace (D), from December 9, 1886

▌3. Edward J. Gay (D)
▌4. Newton C. Blanchard (D)
▌5. J. Floyd King (D)
▌6. Alfred B. Irion (D)

==== Maine ====
▌1. Thomas B. Reed (R)
▌2. Nelson Dingley Jr. (R)
▌3. Seth L. Milliken (R)
▌4. Charles A. Boutelle (R)

==== Maryland ====
▌1. Charles H. Gibson (D)
▌2. Frank T. Shaw (D)
▌3. William H. Cole (D), until July 8, 1886

▌Henry W. Rusk (D), from November 2, 1886

▌4. John V. L. Findlay (D)
▌5. Barnes Compton (D)
▌6. Louis E. McComas (R)

==== Massachusetts ====
▌1. Robert T. Davis (R)
▌2. John D. Long (R)
▌3. Ambrose A. Ranney (R)
▌4. Patrick A. Collins (D)
▌5. Edward D. Hayden (R)
▌6. Henry B. Lovering (D)
▌7. Eben F. Stone (R)
▌8. Charles H. Allen (R)
▌9. Frederick D. Ely (R)
▌10. William W. Rice (R)
▌11. William Whiting (R)
▌12. Francis W. Rockwell (R)

==== Michigan ====
▌1. William C. Maybury (D)
▌2. Nathaniel B. Eldredge (D)
▌3. James O'Donnell (R)
▌4. Julius C. Burrows (R)
▌5. Charles C. Comstock (D)
▌6. Edwin B. Winans (D)
▌7. Ezra C. Carleton (D)
▌8. Timothy E. Tarsney (D)
▌9. Byron M. Cutcheon (R)
▌10. Spencer O. Fisher (D)
▌11. Seth C. Moffatt (R)

==== Minnesota ====
▌1. Milo White (R)
▌2. James B. Wakefield (R)
▌3. Horace B. Strait (R)
▌4. John B. Gilfillan (R)
▌5. Knute Nelson (R)

==== Mississippi ====
▌1. John M. Allen (D)
▌2. James B. Morgan (D)
▌3. Thomas C. Catchings (D)
▌4. Frederick G. Barry (D)
▌5. Otho R. Singleton (D)
▌6. Henry S. Van Eaton (D)
▌7. Ethelbert Barksdale (D)

==== Missouri ====
▌1. William H. Hatch (D)
▌2. John B. Hale (D)
▌3. Alexander M. Dockery (D)
▌4. James N. Burnes (D)
▌5. William Warner (R)
▌6. John T. Heard (D)
▌7. John E. Hutton (D)
▌8. John J. O'Neill (D)
▌9. John M. Glover (D)
▌10. Martin L. Clardy (D)
▌11. Richard P. Bland (D)
▌12. William J. Stone (D)
▌13. William H. Wade (R)
▌14. William Dawson (D)

==== Nebraska ====
▌1. Archibald J. Weaver (R)
▌2. James Laird (R)
▌3. George W. E. Dorsey (R)

==== Nevada ====
▌At-large. William Woodburn (R)

==== New Hampshire ====
▌1. Martin A. Haynes (R)
▌2. Jacob H. Gallinger (R)

==== New Jersey ====
▌1. George Hires (R)
▌2. James Buchanan (R)
▌3. Robert S. Green (D), until January 17, 1887
▌4. James N. Pidcock (D)
▌5. William W. Phelps (R)
▌6. Herman Lehlbach (R)
▌7. William McAdoo (D)

==== New York ====
▌1. Perry Belmont (D)
▌2. Felix Campbell (D)
▌3. Darwin R. James (R)
▌4. Peter P. Mahoney (D)
▌5. Archibald M. Bliss (D)
▌6. Nicholas Muller (D)
▌7. John J. Adams (D)
▌8. Samuel S. Cox (D), until May 20, 1885

▌Timothy J. Campbell (D), from November 3, 1885

▌9. Joseph Pulitzer (D), until April 10, 1886

▌Samuel S. Cox (D), from November 2, 1886

▌10. Abram S. Hewitt (D), until December 30, 1886
▌11. Truman A. Merriman (D)
▌12. Abraham Dowdney (D), until December 10, 1886
▌13. Egbert L. Viele (D)
▌14. William G. Stahlnecker (D)
▌15. Lewis Beach (D), until August 10, 1886

▌Henry Bacon (D), from December 6, 1886

▌16. John H. Ketcham (R)
▌17. James G. Lindsley (R)
▌18. Henry G. Burleigh (R)
▌19. John Swinburne (R)
▌20. George West (R)
▌21. Frederick A. Johnson (R)
▌22. Abraham X. Parker (R)
▌23. John T. Spriggs (D)
▌24. John S. Pindar (D)
▌25. Frank Hiscock (R)
▌26. Stephen C. Millard (R)
▌27. Sereno E. Payne (R)
▌28. John Arnot Jr. (D), until November 20, 1886
▌29. Ira Davenport (R)
▌30. Charles S. Baker (R)
▌31. John G. Sawyer (R)
▌32. John M. Farquhar (R)
▌33. John B. Weber (R)
▌34. Walter L. Sessions (R)

==== North Carolina ====
▌1. Thomas G. Skinner (D)
▌2. James E. O'Hara (R)
▌3. Wharton J. Green (D)
▌4. William Ruffin Cox (D)
▌5. James W. Reid (D), until December 31, 1886
▌6. Risden T. Bennett (D)
▌7. John S. Henderson (D)
▌8. William H. H. Cowles (D)
▌9. Thomas D. Johnston (D)

==== Ohio ====
▌1. Benjamin Butterworth (R)
▌2. Charles E. Brown (R)
▌3. James E. Campbell (D)
▌4. Charles M. Anderson (D)
▌5. Benjamin Le Fevre (D)
▌6. William D. Hill (D)
▌7. George E. Seney (D)
▌8. John Little (R)
▌9. William C. Cooper (R)
▌10. Jacob Romeis (R)
▌11. William W. Ellsberry (D)
▌12. Albert C. Thompson (R)
▌13. Joseph H. Outhwaite (D)
▌14. Charles H. Grosvenor (R)
▌15. Beriah Wilkins (D)
▌16. George W. Geddes (D)
▌17. Adoniram J. Warner (D)
▌18. Isaac H. Taylor (R)
▌19. Ezra B. Taylor (R)
▌20. William McKinley (R)
▌21. Martin A. Foran (D)

==== Oregon ====
▌At-large. Binger Hermann (R)

==== Pennsylvania ====
▌1. Henry H. Bingham (R)
▌2. Charles O'Neill (R)
▌3. Samuel J. Randall (D)
▌4. William D. Kelley (R)
▌5. Alfred C. Harmer (R)
▌6. James B. Everhart (R)
▌7. I. Newton Evans (R)
▌8. Daniel Ermentrout (D)
▌9. John A. Hiestand (R)
▌10. William H. Sowden (D)
▌11. John B. Storm (D)
▌12. Joseph A. Scranton (R)
▌13. Charles N. Brumm (R)
▌14. Franklin Bound (R)
▌15. Frank C. Bunnell (R)
▌16. William W. Brown (R)
▌17. Jacob M. Campbell (R)
▌18. Louis E. Atkinson (R)
▌19. John A. Swope (D), from November 3, 1885
▌20. Andrew G. Curtin (D)
▌21. Charles E. Boyle (D)
▌22. James S. Negley (R)
▌23. Thomas M. Bayne (R)
▌24. Oscar L. Jackson (R)
▌25. Alexander C. White (R)
▌26. George W. Fleeger (R)
▌27. William L. Scott (D)
▌At-large. Edwin S. Osborne (R)

==== Rhode Island ====
▌1. Henry J. Spooner (R)
▌2. William A. Pirce (R), until January 25, 1887

▌Charles H. Page (D), from February 21, 1887

==== South Carolina ====
▌1. Samuel Dibble (D)
▌2. George D. Tillman (D)
▌3. D. Wyatt Aiken (D)
▌4. William H. Perry (D)
▌5. John J. Hemphill (D)
▌6. George W. Dargan (D)
▌7. Robert Smalls (R)

==== Tennessee ====
▌1. Augustus H. Pettibone (R)
▌2. Leonidas C. Houk (R)
▌3. John R. Neal (D)
▌4. Benton McMillin (D)
▌5. James D. Richardson (D)
▌6. Andrew J. Caldwell (D)
▌7. John G. Ballentine (D)
▌8. John M. Taylor (D)
▌9. Presley T. Glass (D)
▌10. Zachary Taylor (R)

==== Texas ====
▌1. Charles Stewart (D)
▌2. John H. Reagan (D)
▌3. James H. Jones (D)
▌4. David B. Culberson (D)
▌5. James W. Throckmorton (D)
▌6. Olin Wellborn (D)
▌7. William H. Crain (D)
▌8. James F. Miller (D)
▌9. Roger Q. Mills (D)
▌10. Joseph D. Sayers (D)
▌11. Samuel W. T. Lanham (D)

==== Vermont ====
▌1. John W. Stewart (R)
▌2. William W. Grout (R)

==== Virginia ====
▌1. Thomas Croxton (D)
▌2. Harry Libbey (RA)
▌3. George D. Wise (D)
▌4. James D. Brady (R)
▌5. George Cabell (D)
▌6. John W. Daniel (D)
▌7. Charles T. O'Ferrall (D)
▌8. John S. Barbour Jr. (D)
▌9. Connally F. Trigg (D)
▌10. John R. Tucker (D)

==== West Virginia ====
▌1. Nathan Goff (R)
▌2. William L. Wilson (D)
▌3. Charles P. Snyder (D)
▌4. Eustace Gibson (D)

==== Wisconsin ====
▌1. Lucien B. Caswell (R)
▌2. Edward S. Bragg (D)
▌3. Robert M. La Follette Sr. (R)
▌4. Isaac W. Van Schaick (R)
▌5. Joseph Rankin (D), until January 24, 1886

▌Thomas R. Hudd (D), from March 8, 1886

▌6. Richard W. Guenther (R)
▌7. Ormsby B. Thomas (R)
▌8. William T. Price (R), until December 6, 1886

▌Hugh H. Price (R), from January 18, 1887

▌9. Isaac Stephenson (R)

==== Non-voting members ====
▌Arizona Territory. Curtis C. Bean (R)
▌Dakota Territory. Oscar S. Gifford (R)
▌Idaho Territory. John Hailey (D)
▌Montana Territory. Joseph Toole (D)
▌New Mexico Territory. Antonio Joseph (D)
▌Utah Territory. John T. Caine (D)
▌Washington Territory. Charles S. Voorhees (D)
▌Wyoming Territory. Joseph M. Carey (R)

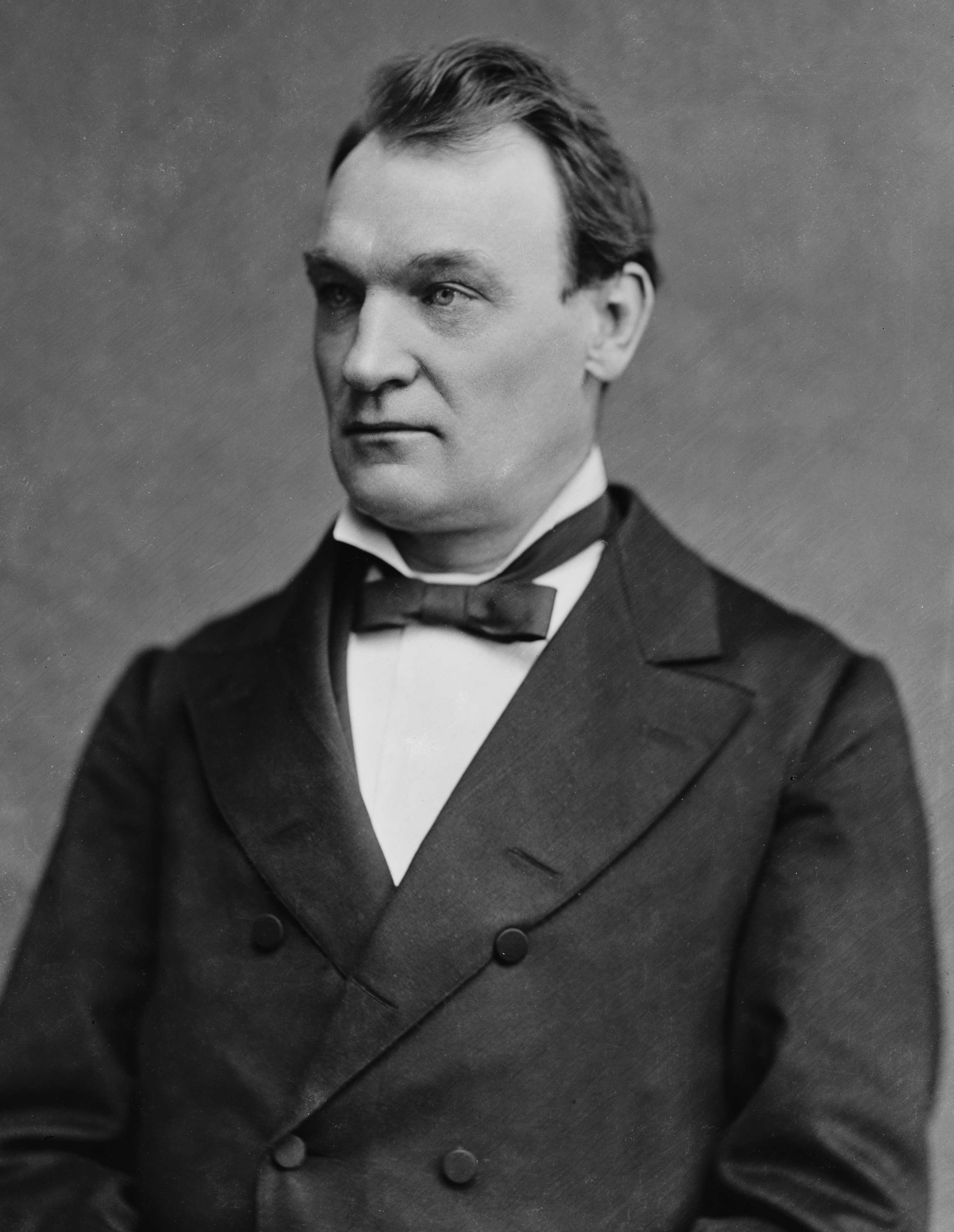
House Speaker John G: Carlisle

== Changes in membership ==
The count below reflects changes from the beginning of the first session of this Congress.

=== Senate ===
- Replacements: 7
  - Democratic: 1 seat net gain
  - Republican: 1 seat net loss
  - Liberal Republican: 1 seat net loss
- Deaths: 3
- Resignations: 6
- Interim appointments: 1
- Total seats with changes: 9

State (class)	Vacated by	Reason for vacancy	Subsequent	Date of successor's installation
New Hampshire (3)	Vacant	Appointed to fill vacancy in term.	Henry W. Blair (R)	March 5, 1885
Illinois (3)	Vacant	Legislature failed to elect, with several delays in election process held from February 18 to May 19. Incumbent Logan eventually chosen to retake seat.	John A. Logan (R)	May 19, 1885
Oregon (3)	Vacant	Failure to elect.	John H. Mitchell (R)	November 18, 1885
Arkansas (2)	Augustus H. Garland (D)	Resigned March 6, 1885, after being appointed United States Attorney General. Successor was elected.	James H. Berry (D)	March 20, 1885
Delaware (1)	Thomas F. Bayard (D)	Resigned March 6, 1885, after being appointed United States Secretary of State. Successor was elected.	George Gray (D)	March 18, 1885
Mississippi (2)	Lucius Q. C. Lamar II (D)	Resigned March 6, 1885, after being appointed United States Secretary of the Interior. Successor was appointed and subsequently elected.	Edward C. Walthall (D)	March 9, 1885
California (1)	John F. Miller (R)	Died March 8, 1886. Successor was appointed.	George Hearst (D)	March 23, 1886
Tennessee (1)	Howell E. Jackson (D)	Resigned April 14, 1886, after being appointed judge for the United States Circuit Court for the Sixth Circuit. Successor was appointed.	Washington C. Whitthorne (D)	April 16, 1886
California (1)	George Hearst (D)	Successor was elected August 4, 1886.	Abram Williams (R)	August 4, 1886
New Hampshire (2)	Austin F. Pike (R)	Died October 8, 1886. Successor was appointed.	Person C. Cheney (R)	November 24, 1886
Illinois (3)	John A. Logan (R)	Died December 26, 1886. Successor was elected.	Charles B. Farwell (R)	January 19, 1887

=== House of Representatives ===
- Replacements: 11
  - Democratic: 2 seat net gain
  - Republican: 2 seat net loss
- Deaths: 8
- Resignations: 7
- Contested election: 1
- Total seats with changes: 16

District	Vacated by	Reason for change	Successor	Date successor seated
Pennsylvania 19th	Vacant	Elected to finish term of Rep. William A. Duncan resigned during previous congress	John A. Swope (D)	November 3, 1885
Arkansas 3rd	Vacant	Elected to finish term of Rep. James K. Jones resigned during previous congress	Thomas C. McRae (D)	December 7, 1885
New York 8th	Samuel S. Cox (D)	Resigned May 20, 1885, after being appointed Minister to the Ottoman Empire	Timothy J. Campbell (D)	November 3, 1885
Illinois 5th	Reuben Ellwood (R)	Died July 1, 1885	Albert J. Hopkins (R)	December 7, 1885
Wisconsin 5th	Joseph Rankin (D)	Died January 24, 1886	Thomas R. Hudd (D)	March 8, 1886
Louisiana 2nd	Michael Hahn (R)	Died March 15, 1886	Nathaniel D. Wallace (D)	December 9, 1886
New York 9th	Joseph Pulitzer (D)	Resigned April 10, 1886	Samuel S. Cox (D)	November 2, 1886
Maryland 3rd	William H. Cole (D)	Died July 8, 1886	Harry W. Rusk (D)	November 2, 1886
New York 15th	Lewis Beach (D)	Died August 10, 1886	Henry Bacon (D)	December 6, 1886
New York 28th	John Arnot Jr. (D)	Died November 20, 1886	Vacant until next Congress	
Wisconsin 8th	William T. Price (R)	Died December 6, 1886	Hugh H. Price (R)	January 18, 1887
New York 12th	Abraham Dowdney (D)	Died December 10, 1886	Vacant until next Congress	
New York 10th	Abram Hewitt (D)	Resigned December 30, 1886, after being elected Mayor of New York	Vacant until next Congress	
North Carolina 5th	James W. Reid (D)	Resigned December 31, 1886	Vacant until next Congress	
New Jersey 3rd	Robert S. Green (D)	Resigned January 17, 1887, after being elected Governor of New Jersey	Vacant until next Congress	
Rhode Island 2nd	William A. Pirce (R)	Seat declared vacant January 25, 1887, due to election irregularities	Charles H. Page (D)	February 21, 1887

== Committees ==
Lists of committees and their party leaders for members of the House and Senate committees can be found through the Official Congressional Directory at the bottom of this article. The directory after the pages of terms of service lists committees of the Senate, House (Standing with Subcommittees, Select and Special) and Joint and, after that, House/Senate committee assignments. On the committees section of the House and Senate in the Official Congressional Directory, the committee's members on the first row on the left side shows the chairman of the committee and on the right side shows the ranking member of the committee.

=== Senate ===
- Additional Accommodations for the Library of Congress (Select) (Chairman: Daniel W. Voorhees; Ranking Member: Justin S. Morrill)
- Agriculture and Forestry (Chairman: Warner Miller; Ranking Member: James Z. George)
- Appropriations (Chairman: William B. Allison; Ranking Member: John A. Logan)
- Audit and Control the Contingent Expenses of the Senate (Chairman: John P. Jones; Ranking Member: Zebulon B. Vance)
- Civil Service and Retrenchment (Chairman: Joseph R. Hawley; Ranking Member: Daniel W. Voorhees)
- Claims (Chairman: Austin F. Pike; Ranking Member: Howell E. Jackson)
- Coast Defenses (Chairman: Joseph N. Dolph; Ranking Member: Samuel B. Maxey)
- Commerce (Chairman: Samuel J.R. McMillan; Ranking Member: Matt W. Ransom)
- Compensation of Members of Congress (Select)
- Distributing Public Revenue Among the States (Select)
- District of Columbia (Chairman: John J. Ingalls; Ranking Member: Isham G. Harris)
- Education and Labor (Chairman: Henry W. Blair; Ranking Member: Wilkinson Call)
- Engrossed Bills (Chairman: Eli Saulsbury; Ranking Member: William B. Allison)
- Enrolled Bills (Chairman: Thomas M. Bowen; Ranking Member: Alfred H. Colquitt)
- Epidemic Diseases (Select) (Chairman: Isham G. Harris; Ranking Member: John C. Spooner)
- Examine the Several Branches in the Civil Service (Chairman: Dwight M. Sabin; Ranking Member: Wade Hampton)
- Executive Departments Methods (Select)
- Expenditures of Public Money (Chairman: Shelby M. Cullom; Ranking Member: James B. Beck)
- Finance (Chairman: Justin S. Morrill; Ranking Member: Daniel W. Voorhees)
- Fisheries (Chairman: Thomas W. Palmer; Ranking Member: John T. Morgan)
- Foreign Relations (Chairman: John Sherman; Ranking Member: John T. Morgan)
- Indian Affairs (Chairman: Henry L. Dawes; Ranking Member: Samuel B. Maxey)
- Indian Traders (Select)
- Interstate Commerce (Select) (Chairman: Shelby M. Cullom; Ranking Member: N/A)
- Judiciary (Chairman: George F. Edmunds; Ranking Member: William M. Evarts)
- Library (Chairman: William J. Sewell; Ranking Member: Daniel W. Voorhees)
- Manufactures (Chairman: Harrison H. Riddleberger; Ranking Member: Alfred H. Colquitt)
- Military Affairs (Chairman: John A. Logan; Ranking Member: Charles F. Manderson)
- Mines and Mining (Chairman: Henry M. Teller; Ranking Member: Wade Hampton)
- Mississippi River and its Tributaries (Select) (Chairman: Charles H. Van Wyck; Ranking Member: Francis M. Cockrell)
- Naval Affairs (Chairman: J. Donald Cameron; Ranking Member: John R. McPherson)
- Nicaraguan Claims (Select) (Chairman: Samuel B. Maxey; Ranking Member: Benjamin Harrison)
- Ordnance and War Ships (Select) (Chairman: Joseph R. Hawley; Ranking Member: Johnson N. Camden)
- Patents (Chairman: J. Donald Cameron; Ranking Member: Johnson N. Camden)
- Pensions (Chairman: John I. Mitchell; Ranking Member: Howell E. Jackson)
- Post Office and Post Roads (Chairman: Omar D. Conger; Ranking Member: Samuel B. Maxey)
- Potomac River Front (Select)
- Printing (Chairman: Charles F. Manderson; Ranking Member: Arthur P. Gorman)
- Private Land Claims (Chairman: Matt W. Ransom; Ranking Member: George F. Edmunds)
- Privileges and Elections (Chairman: George F. Hoar; Ranking Member: Eli Saulsbury)
- Public Buildings and Grounds (Chairman: William Mahone; Ranking Member: John T. Morgan)
- Public Lands (Chairman: Preston B. Plumb; Ranking Member: John T. Morgan)
- Railroads (Chairman: Philetus Sawyer; Ranking Member: Joseph E. Brown)
- Revision of the Laws (Chairman: James F. Wilson; Ranking Member: John E. Kenna)
- Revolutionary Claims (Chairman: Charles W. Jones; Ranking Member: Samuel J.R. McMillan)
- Rules (Chairman: William P. Frye; Ranking Member: Isham G. Harris)
- Tariff Regulation (Select)
- Tenth Census (Select) (Chairman: Eugene Hale; Ranking Member: Richard Coke)
- Territories (Chairman: Benjamin Harrison; Ranking Member: Matthew C. Butler)
- Transportation Routes to the Seaboard (Chairman: Nelson W. Aldrich; Ranking Member: Randall L. Gibson)
- Whole
- Woman Suffrage (Select) (Chairman: Francis M. Cockrell; Ranking Member: Thomas W. Palmer)

=== House of Representatives ===
- Accounts (Chairman: John T. Spriggs; Ranking Member: George E. Adams)
- Admission to the Floor (Select)
- Agriculture (Chairman: William H. Hatch; Ranking Member: Presley T. Glass)
- Alcoholic Liquor Traffic (Select) (Chairman: James E. Campbell; Ranking Member: Truman A. Merriman)
- American Ship building (Select) (Chairman: Poindexter Dunn; Ranking Member: Charles C. Comstock)
- Appropriations (Chairman: Samuel J. Randall; Ranking Member: Joseph G. Cannon)
- Banking and Currency (Chairman: James F. Miller; Ranking Member: John E. Hutton)
- Claims (Chairman: William M. Springer; Ranking Member: William H. Sowden)
- Coinage, Weights and Measures (Chairman: Richard P. Bland; Ranking Member: William D. Bynum)
- Commerce (Chairman: John H. Reagan; Ranking Member: Alfred B. Irion)
- District of Columbia (Chairman: John S. Barbour; Ranking Member: John T. Heard)
- Education (Chairman: D. Wyatt Aiken; Ranking Member: Peter P. Mahoney)
- Elections (Chairman: Henry G. Turner; Ranking Member: Benton J. Hall)
- Enrolled Bills (Chairman: William H. Neece; Ranking Member: Adoniram J. Holmes)
- Expenditures in the Interior Department (Chairman: James B. Weaver; Ranking Member: Charles N. Brumm)
- Expenditures in the Justice Department (Chairman: Eustace Gibson; Ranking Member: Seth L. Milliken)
- Expenditures in the Navy Department (Chairman: John M. Taylor; Ranking Member: Jonathan H. Rowell)
- Expenditures in the Post Office Department (Chairman: Seaborn Reese; Ranking Member: Zachary Taylor)
- Expenditures in the State Department (Chairman: Risden T. Bennett; Ranking Member: Joseph A. Scranton)
- Expenditures in the Treasury Department (Chairman: Robert Lowry; Ranking Member: Michael Hahn)
- Expenditures in the War Department (Chairman: Thomas A. Robertson; Ranking Member: Frederick A. Johnson)
- Expenditures on Public Buildings (Chairman: Lewis Beach; Ranking Member: Augustus H. Pettibone)
- Foreign Affairs (Chairman: Perry Belmont; Ranking Member: William H. Crain)
- Indian Affairs (Chairman: Olin Wellborn; Ranking Member: James H. Ward)
- Invalid Pensions (Chairman: Courtland C. Matson; Ranking Member: John S. Pindar)
- Judiciary (Chairman: John R. Tucker; Ranking Member: Risden T. Bennett)
- Labor (Chairman: John J. O'Neill; Ranking Member: William H. Crain)
- Levees and Improvements of the Mississippi River (Chairman: J. Floyd King; Ranking Member: William Dawson)
- Manufactures (Chairman: George D. Wise; Ranking Member: John S. Pindar)
- Mileage (Chairman: John H. Rogers; Ranking Member: Ambrose A. Ranney)
- Military Affairs (Chairman: Edward S. Bragg; Ranking Member: Charles M. Anderson)
- Militia (Chairman: Nicholas Muller; Ranking Member: Barnes Compton)
- Mines and Mining (Chairman: Martin L. Clardy; Ranking Member: Frederick G. Barry)
- Naval Affairs (Chairman: Hilary A. Herbert; Ranking Member: Joseph D. Sayers)
- Pacific Railroads (Chairman: James W. Throckmorton; Ranking Member: James D. Richardson)
- Patents (Chairman: Charles L. Mitchell; Ranking Member: William H.H. Cowles)
- Pensions (Chairman: Nathaniel B. Eldredge; Ranking Member: John E. Hutton)
- Post Office and Post Roads (Chairman: James H. Blount; Ranking Member: Frederick G. Barry)
- Printing (Chairman: Ethelbert Barksdale; Ranking Member: John M. Farquhar)
- Private Land Claims (Chairman: John E. Halsell; Ranking Member: Robert S. Green)
- Public Buildings and Grounds (Chairman: Samuel Dibble; Ranking Member: Thomas D. Johnston)
- Public Lands (Chairman: Thomas R. Cobb; Ranking Member: Thomas Chipman McRae)
- Railways and Canals (Chairman: Robert H. M. Davidson; Ranking Member: James N. Pidcock)
- Revision of Laws (Chairman: William C. Oates; Ranking Member: John B. Hale)
- Rivers and Harbors (Chairman: Albert S. Willis; Ranking Member: John M. Glover)
- Rules (Chairman: John G. Carlisle; Ranking Member: Thomas B. Reed)
- Standards of Official Conduct
- Territories (Chairman: William D. Hill; Ranking Member: William Dawson)
- War Claims (Chairman: George W. Geddes; Ranking Member: James W. Reid)
- Ways and Means (Chairman: William R. Morrison; Ranking Member: William D. Kelley)
- Whole

=== Joint committees ===
- Conditions of Indian Tribes (Special)
- The Library (Chairman: Otho R. Singleton; Vice Chairman: Charles O'Neill)
- Printing
- Scientific Bureaus

== Caucuses ==
- Democratic (House)
- Democratic (Senate)

== Employees ==
=== Legislative branch agency directors ===
- Architect of the Capitol: Edward Clark
- Librarian of Congress: Ainsworth Rand Spofford
- Public Printer of the United States: Sterling P. Rounds, until 1886
  - Thomas E. Benedict, starting 1886

=== Senate ===
- Secretary: Anson G. McCook
- Librarian: George M. Weston
- Sergeant at Arms: William P. Canady
- Chaplain: Elias D. Huntley, Methodist, until March 15, 1886
  - John G. Butler, Lutheran, elected March 15, 1886

=== House of Representatives ===
- Chaplain: John Summerfield Lindsay (Episcopalian), until December 7, 1885
  - William H. Milburn (Methodist), elected December 7, 1885
- Doorkeeper: Samuel Donelson, elected December 7, 1885
- Clerk: John B. Clark Jr.
- Clerk at the Speaker's Table: Nathaniel T. Crutchfield
- Postmaster: Lycurgus Dalton
- Reading Clerks: Thomas S. Pettit (D) and Neill S. Brown Jr. (R)
- Sergeant at Arms: John P. Leedom

== See also ==
- 1884 United States elections (elections leading to this Congress)
  - 1884 United States presidential election
  - 1884–85 United States Senate elections
  - 1884 United States House of Representatives elections
- 1886 United States elections (elections during this Congress, leading to the next Congress)
  - 1886–87 United States Senate elections
  - 1886 United States House of Representatives elections
