= Thomas D. Collins =

Medal of Honor recipient (1847–1935)

- Born: August 14, 1847; Neversink, New York, US
- Died: May 26, 1935 (aged 87); Middletown, New York, US
- Military career
- Allegiance: United States of America
- Branch: United States Army; Union Army
- Service years: 1861-1865
- Rank: Sergeant
- Unit: 143rd Regiment, New York Volunteer Infantry - Company H
- Conflicts: American Civil War: Battle of Resaca
- Awards: Medal of Honor

Thomas D. Collins (August 14, 1847 – May 26, 1935) was an American soldier who fought in the American Civil War. Collins received the country's highest award for bravery during combat, the Medal of Honor, for his action during the Battle of Resaca in Georgia on 15 May 1864. He was honored with the award on 14 August 1896.

== Biography ==
Collins was born in Neversink, New York on 14 August 1847. He enlisted in the 143rd New York Volunteer Infantry at Liberty, New York. He died on 26 May 1935 in Middletown, New York.

== Medal of Honor citation ==
Captured a regimental flag of the enemy.

== See also ==
- List of American Civil War Medal of Honor recipients: A–F
