= 143rd New York Infantry Regiment =

- Active: August 14, 1862 - July 20, 1865
- Country: United States
- Allegiance: Union
- Branch: Infantry
- Engagements: Siege of Suffolk; Battle of Wauhatchie; Battle of Missionary Ridge; Atlanta campaign Battle of Resaca; Battle of Dallas; Battle of New Hope Church; Battle of Allatoona; Battle of Marietta; Battle of Kennesaw Mountain; Battle of Peachtree Creek; Siege of Atlanta; Sherman's March to the Sea; Carolinas campaign Battle of Bentonville

The 143rd New York Infantry Regiment (a.k.a. "Sullivan County Regiment") was an infantry regiment in the Union Army during the American Civil War.

== Service ==
The 143rd New York Infantry was organized at Monticello, New York, beginning August 14, 1862 and mustered in for three years service on October 8, 1862 under the command of Colonel David P. DeWitt.

The regiment was attached to 3rd Brigade, Abercrombie's Division, Defenses of Washington, D.C., to February 1863. 3rd Brigade, Abercrombie's Division, XXII Corps, Department of Washington, to April 1863. 2nd Brigade, 3rd Division, VII Corps, Department of Virginia, to May 1863. 1st Brigade, 2nd Division, IV Corps, to July, 1863. 1st Brigade, 3rd Division, XI Corps, Army of the Potomac, to October 1863, and Army of the Cumberland to April 1864. 3rd Brigade, 1st Division, XX Corps, Army of the Cumberland, to July 1865.

The 143rd New York Infantry mustered out July 20, 1865.

== Detailed service ==
1862:

14 October: Left New York for Washington, D.C.

1863:

Duty in the defenses of Washington, D. C. until April.

April 18: Moved to Suffolk, Va.

April 20—May 4: Siege of Suffolk.

May 3: Providence Church.

May 4: Suffolk razed.

June 24—July 7: Dix's Campaign on the Peninsula.

July 10: Moved to Washington, D.C.

July 13–22: Pursuit of Lee to Berlin, Md.

Near Bristoe Station, Va., until September.

September 24—October 3: Movement to Bridgeport, Ala.

October 20: Reconnaissance from Bridgeport to Trenton (detachment).

October 25–29: March along line of Nashville & Chattanooga Railroad to Lookout Valley, Tenn.

October 26–29: Reopening Tennessee River.

October 28–29: Battle of Wauhatchie, Tenn.

November 23–27: Chattanooga-Ringgold Campaign.

November 23: Orchard Knob.

November 24–25: Tunnel Hill.

November 25: Missionary Ridge.

November 28—December 17: March to the relief of Knoxville.

1864:

Duty in Lookout Valley until May.

May 1 -- 8: Atlanta Campaign.

May 8 -- 11 Demonstration on Rocky Faced Ridge.

May 14–15: Battle of Resaca.

May 19: Near Cassville.

May 22–25: Advance on Dallas.

May 25: New Hope Church.

May 26—June 5: Battles about Dallas, New Hope Church, and Allatoona Hills.

June 4: Ackworth.

June 10—July 2: Operations about Marietta and against Kennesaw.

June 11–14: Pine Hill.

June 15–17: Lost Mountain.

June 15: Gilgal or Golgotha Church.

June 17: Muddy Creek.

June 19: Noyes Creek.

June 22: Kolb's Farm.

June 27: Assault on Kennesaw.

July 4: Ruff's Station or Smyrna Camp Ground.

July 5 -- 17: Chattahoochie River.

July 19–20: Peachtree Creek.

July 22—August 25: Siege of Atlanta.

August 26—September 2: Operations at Chattahoochie River Bridge.

September 2 -- November 15: Occupation of Atlanta.

October 26–29: Expedition from Atlanta to Tuckum's Cross Roads.

November 15—December 10: March to the sea.

December 9: Montieth Swamp..

December 10–21: Siege of Savannah.

1865:

January through April: Carolinas Campaign.

March 16: Averysboro, N.C.

March 19–21: Battle of Bentonville.

March 24: Occupation of Goldsboro.

April 7 -- 13: Advance on Raleigh.

April 14: Occupation of Raleigh.

April 26: Bennett's House.

April 29—May 20: Surrender of Johnston and his army. Marched to Washington, D.C., via Richmond, Va.

May 24: Grand Review of the Armies

Duty at Washington, D.C., until July.

== Casualties ==
The regiment lost a total of 220 men during service; 5 officers and 37 enlisted men killed or mortally wounded, 1 officer and 177 enlisted men died of disease.

== Commanders ==
- Colonel David P. DeWitt - discharged April 29, 1863
- Colonel Horace Boughton

== Notable members ==
- Sergeant Thomas D. Collins, Company H - Medal of Honor recipient for action at the Battle of Resaca

== See also ==
- List of New York Civil War regiments
- New York in the Civil War
