= Frederick G. Barry =

American politician (1845–1909)

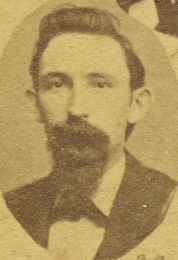

Member of the U.S. House of Representatives from Mississippi's 4th district
- In office March 4, 1885 – March 3, 1889
- Preceded by: Hernando D. Money
- Succeeded by: Clarke Lewis

Personal details
- Born: Frederick George Barry; January 12, 1845 Woodbury, Tennessee, U.S.
- Died: May 7, 1909 (aged 64)
- Resting place: Odd Fellows Rest Cemetery, Aberdeen, Mississippi

Frederick George Barry (January 12, 1845 – May 7, 1909) was an American Civil War veteran, lawyer, and politician who served two terms as a U.S. representative from Mississippi from 1885 to 1889.

== Biography ==
Born in Woodbury, Tennessee, Barry received a limited education.

=== Civil War ===
He served as a private in Company E, Eighth Confederate Cavalry, Col. William B. Wade's regiment, during the Civil War.

=== Early career ===
Returning to private life, he studied law and was admitted to the bar, commencing practice in Aberdeen, Mississippi. He moved to West Point, Mississippi, in 1873 and continued the practice of law, also serving as member of the Mississippi State Senate from 1875 to 1879.

=== Congress ===
Barry was elected as a Democrat to the Forty-ninth and Fiftieth Congresses (March 4, 1885 – March 3, 1889). He was not a candidate for renomination in 1888.

=== Later career and death ===
He then resumed the practice of law in West Point, where he died at the age of 64. He was interred in Odd Fellows Rest Cemetery, Aberdeen, Mississippi.

U.S. House of Representatives
Preceded by Hernando D. Money	Member of the U.S. House of Representatives from Mississippi's 4th congressional district 1885–1889	Succeeded by Clarke Lewis
