= Bobby Varin =

American Dirt Modified racing driver (born 1970)

- Born: Robert D. Varin; August 22, 1970 (age 56) Sharon Springs, New York

Modified racing career
- Debut season: 1986
- Car number: 00, 1J, 18, 76, 85, 97
- Championships: 10
- Wins: 159

Previous series
- 2009-2019: Sprint Cars

Championship titles
- 2005 Race of Champions Dirt Modified Tour; 2010 Mr. Dirt (Eastern Region)
- Statistics up to date as of October 26, 2026.

Robert Varin (August 22, 1970) is an American dirt modified and sprint car racing driver. He has been credited with over 150 feature event wins at race tracks in the Northeastern United States.

== Racing career ==
Varin began racing in 1986 in the support divisions at Fonda Speedway, New York, with limited success. When he turned 18, he moved to the modified division, but it took six more seasons before he captured his first feature in 1994.

Varin has competed successfully at Bridgeport Speedway in New Jersey and Devil's Bowl Speedway in West Haven, Vermont, as well as many New York venues, including Albany-Saratoga Speedway in Malta, Lebanon Valley Speedway, Orange County Fair Speedway in Middletown, Outlaw Speedway in Dundee, and Utica-Rome Speedway in Vernon.

Varin captured the track championship at Fonda Speedway seven times (2000, 2005, 2006, 2008, 2009, 2010, 2018), three points titles at Glen Ridge Motorsports Park in Fultonville, New York (2013, 2014, 2015), and the 1999 Independence Day event at the Syracuse Mile.

== Personal life ==
Varin introduced his son Danny to modified racing at an early age. Danny Varin has since become a regular contender at sprint car events sanctioned by Lucas Oil Empire Super Sprint Series, Patriot Sprint Tour, United Racing Club, and the United States Auto Club (USAC).
