= List of former United States representatives (Q) =

This is a complete list of former United States representatives whose last names begin with the letter Q.

== Number of years and terms the member has served ==
The number of years the representative/delegate has served in Congress indicates the number of terms the representative/delegate has. Note the representative/delegate can also serve non-consecutive terms if the representative/delegate loses election and wins re-election to the House.

- 2 years - 1 or 2 terms
- 4 years - 2 or 3 terms
- 6 years - 3 or 4 terms
- 8 years - 4 or 5 terms
- 10 years - 5 or 6 terms
- 12 years - 6 or 7 terms
- 14 years - 7 or 8 terms
- 16 years - 8 or 9 terms
- 18 years - 9 or 10 terms
- 20 years - 10 or 11 terms
- 22 years - 11 or 12 terms
- 24 years - 12 or 13 terms
- 26 years - 13 or 14 terms
- 28 years - 14 or 15 terms
- 30 years - 15 or 16 terms
- 32 years - 16 or 17 terms
- 34 years - 17 or 18 terms
- 36 years - 18 or 19 terms
- 38 years - 19 or 20 terms
- 40 years - 20 or 21 terms
- 42 years - 21 or 22 terms
- 44 years - 22 or 23 terms
- 46 years - 23 or 24 terms
- 48 years - 24 or 25 terms
- 50 years - 25 or 26 terms
- 52 years - 26 or 27 terms
- 54 years - 27 or 28 terms
- 56 years - 28 or 29 terms
- 58 years - 29 or 30 terms

Name	Term	State/ Territory	Party	Lifespan
John A. Quackenbush	1889–1893	New York	Republican	1828–1908
James Minor Quarles	1859–1861	Tennessee	Oppositionist	1823–1901
Julian M. Quarles	1899–1901	Virginia	Democratic	1848–1929
Tunstal Quarles	1817–1820	Kentucky	Democratic-Republican	c. 1770–1855
Ben Quayle	2011–2013	Arizona	Republican	1976–present
Dan Quayle	1977–1981	Indiana	Republican	1947–present
John Quayle	1923–1930	New York	Democratic	1868–1930
Manuel L. Quezon	1909–1916	Philippines	None	1878–1944
Al Quie	1958–1979	Minnesota	Republican	1923–2023
Lemuel E. Quigg	1894–1899	New York	Republican	1863–1919
James M. Quigley	1955–1957; 1959–1961	Pennsylvania	Democratic	1918–2011
Jimmy Quillen	1963–1997	Tennessee	Republican	1916–2003
Percy Quin	1913–1932	Mississippi	Democratic	1872–1932
Josiah Quincy III	1805–1813	Massachusetts	Federalist	1772–1864
Jack Quinn	1993–2005	New York	Republican	1951–present
James L. Quinn	1935–1939	Pennsylvania	Democratic	1875–1960
John Quinn	1889–1891	New York	Democratic	1839–1903
Peter A. Quinn	1945–1947	New York	Democratic	1904–1974
T. Vincent Quinn	1949–1951	New York	Democratic	1903–1982
Terence J. Quinn	1877–1878	New York	Democratic	1836–1878
John A. Quitman	1855–1858	Mississippi	Democratic	1798–1858
