= John Hammond (New York politician) =

American politician (1827–1889)

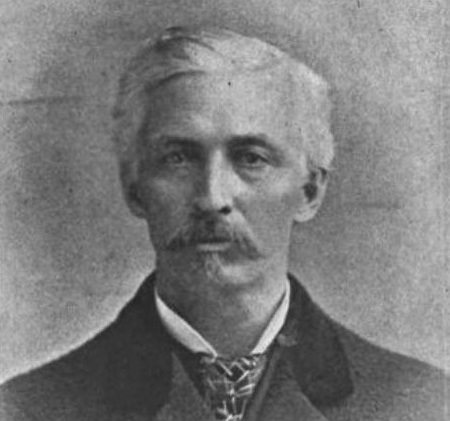

Member of the U.S. House of Representatives from New York's 18th district
- In office March 4, 1879 – March 3, 1883
- Preceded by: Andrew Williams
- Succeeded by: Frederick A. Johnson

Personal details
- Born: August 17, 1827 Crown Point, New York, U.S.
- Died: May 28, 1889 (aged 61) Crown Point, New York, U.S.
- Party: Republican
- Spouse: Charlotte Maria Cross
- Children: 6
- Profession: Businessman

John Hammond (August 17, 1827 – May 28, 1889) was an American manufacturer, Union Army officer and politician from Crown Point, New York. A member of the Republican Party, he served as the U.S. representative for New York's 18th congressional district from 1879 to 1883.

== Early life ==
The son of Jane Renne and Charles F. Hammond, a prominent owner and operator of lumber and iron businesses in Crown Point, New York, John Hammond was born in Crown Point on August 17, 1827. He attended the public schools of Crown Point, Panton, Vermont, and St. Albans, Vermont, and graduated from the academy in St. Albans. He attended Rensselaer Polytechnic Institute and worked at his family's store in Crown Point before moving to California during the 1849 gold rush. He returned to Crown Point after several years in California, and resumed working in his family's businesses.

== Military career ==
At the start of the American Civil War, he assisted in raising and equipping a unit which was mustered into service as Company H, 34th New York Volunteer Infantry. He later helped raise a cavalry company, which he joined as a private; this unit became Company H, 5th New York Volunteer Cavalry Regiment, and the members elected Hammond to be their commander with the rank of captain. During the war he took part in several battles, including the Second Battle of Bull Run and the Battle of Cedar Mountain. He was wounded twice, and advanced to become commander of the 5th New York Cavalry with the rank of colonel. After the war he received the brevet rank of brigadier general in recognition of his superior performance of duty. Hammond became active in the Grand Army of the Republic, and the Military Order of the Loyal Legion of the United States, and the GAR post in Crown Point was named for him.

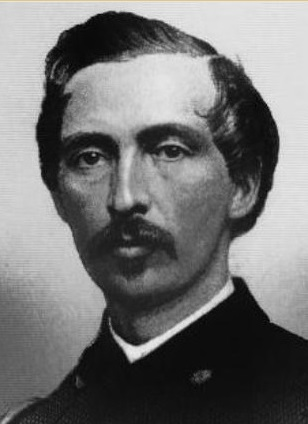
Colonel John Hammond, 5th New York Cavalry, American Civil War.

== Post-Civil War ==
After the war, Hammond returned to Crown Point and became head of his family's businesses. he eventually engineered the merger of his family's iron company with several others, and became president of the newly-organized Crown Point Iron Company. he was also active in several other ventures, including serving as president of the Whitehall and Plattsburgh Railroad. Hammond also owned a farm, and was a breeder of cattle and horses. He was also a civic leader and philanthropist, and donated to or helped construct several local facilities in Crown point, including the Congregational church and the town library.

== Political career ==
Hammond was elected as one of three New York State Prison Inspectors in the 1866 election, and held office from 1867 to 1869. He was a delegate to the 1872 Republican National Convention that nominated Ulysses S. Grant for a second term as president.

In 1878, Hammond was elected represent New York's 18th District in the U.S. House, and he served in the 46th and 47th United States Congresses, (March 4, 1879 to March 3, 1883).

In 1884, he was a delegate to the Republican National Convention and supported James G. Blaine for president.

== Later life ==
Hammond died in Crown Point on May 28, 1889. He was buried at Forest Dale Cemetery in Crown Point.

== Family ==
In 1852, he married Charlotte Maria Cross. They were the parents of seven children, six of whom lived to adulthood.

== See also ==
- List of American Civil War brevet generals

== Sources ==
=== Books ===
- John Hammond: Died May 29, 1889, at His Home, Crown Point, N.Y. Chicago, IL: P. F. Pettibone & Co. 1890.
- Inspectors of State Prisons of the State of New York (1868). Annual Report for 1867. Albany, NY: C. Van Benthuysen & Sons.
- Rutland Railroad Company (1872). Reports of the Managers of the Rutland Railroad Co. to the Stockholders. Rutland, VT: Tuttle & Co.

U.S. House of Representatives
Preceded by Andrew Williams	Member of the U.S. House of Representatives from New York's 18th congressional district 1879–1883	Succeeded by Frederick A. Johnson
