= Thomas R. Horton =

American politician

Thomas Raymond Horton

Member of the U.S. House of Representatives from New York's 18th district
- In office March 4, 1855 – March 3, 1857
- Preceded by: Peter Rowe
- Succeeded by: Clark B. Cochrane

Personal details
- Born: April 18, 1823 Fultonville, New York, U.S.
- Died: July 26, 1894 (aged 71) Fultonville, New York, U.S.
- Resting place: Old Fultonville Cemetery
- Party: Whig

Thomas Raymond Horton (April 18, 1823 – July 26, 1894) was a U.S. representative from New York.

Born in Fultonville, New York, Horton attended the public schools. He studied law and was admitted to the bar and practiced. He served as member of the Fultonville village board of trustees in 1848. He served as clerk of the Montgomery County board of supervisors for six years. He was a Justice of the Peace for eight years. He was editor and publisher of the Amsterdam (New York) Recorder from 1841 to 1857.

Horton was elected as a Whig candidate to the Thirty-fourth Congress (March 4, 1855 - March 3, 1857).

During the protracted dispute over the election of a Speaker of the House in late 1855 and early 1856, fought largely on sectional grounds between proponents and opponents of slavery, Congressman Albert Rust was one of those who attempted to negotiate a compromise. Unhappy about how his efforts were characterized by Horace Greeley in the New-York Tribune, Rust confronted Greeley on the grounds of the United States Capitol and knocked him down. An article about the event was published in a newspaper in Horton's district and over his initials. Upon deciding that the article was inaccurate and its tone offensive, Rust confronted Horton to ask whether he had written the item in question—the preliminary step to issuing a challenge to a duel. Horton admitted authorship and agreed to apologize and retract his words; after first committing to do so in person on the floor of the House, he subsequently reached agreement with Rust to do so in writing instead, and issued his apology and retraction to the Washington Evening Star and other newspapers.

Horton was not a candidate for renomination in 1856. He served as delegate to the 1860 Republican National Convention. During the Civil War, he served as adjutant of the 115th New York Volunteer Infantry Regiment from 1862 to 1864. After the war he was editor and publisher of the Montgomery County Republican. Horton was active in the Montgomery County Agricultural Society, and served on the board of directors of the Fonda and Fultonville Railroad.

Horton died in Fultonville on July 26, 1894. He was interred in the Old Fultonville Cemetery.

U.S. House of Representatives
Preceded by Peter Rowe	Member of the U.S. House of Representatives from New York's 18th congressional district March 4, 1855 – March 3, 1857	Succeeded by Clark B. Cochrane
