= Howland Fish =

American politician

- Born: December 8, 1786; Dutchess County, New York, U.S.
- Died: June 21, 1862 (aged 75); Fultonville, New York, U.S.
- Occupations: Lawyer, state legislator

Howland Fish (December 8, 1786 – June 21, 1862) was an American legislator and lawyer.

He was born in Dutchess County, New York, the son of Peter Fish and Elsie Howland Fish. He graduated from Yale College in 1809. He studied law with Philip Parker of Hudson, New York, and pursued the profession with success in Johnstown, Glen, and Fultonville. He represented Montgomery County, New York, three times in the New York State Legislature, was an active member of the Constitutional Convention of 1820, and in later years held the office of District Attorney.

Fish was married and had at least four sons. He died at Fultonville, New York, at the age of 75.
