= Henry G. Burleigh =

American politician

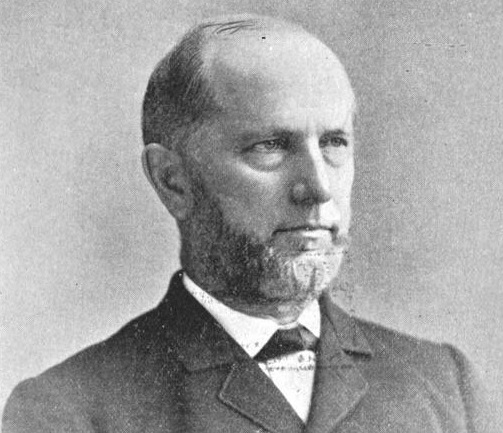

Member of the U.S. House of Representatives from New York
- In office March 4, 1883 – March 3, 1887
- Preceded by: Walter A. Wood
- Succeeded by: Edward W. Greenman
- Constituency: 17th district (1883–85); 18th district (1885–87)

Member of the New York State Assembly from the Washington County, 2nd district
- In office January 1, 1876 – December 31, 1876
- Preceded by: Emerson E. Davis
- Succeeded by: Isaac V. Baker Jr.

Personal details
- Born: June 2, 1832 Canaan, New Hampshire, U.S.
- Died: August 10, 1900 (aged 68) Whitehall, Washington County, New York, U.S.
- Resting place: Mount Hope Cemetery; Ticonderoga, New York
- Party: Republican
- Spouse: Jennie E. Richards Burleigh
- Children: Charles Richards Burleigh; Henry Gordoon Burleigh Jr. James Weeks Burleigh
- Profession: Businessman; Banker; Politician

Henry Gordon Burleigh (June 2, 1832 – August 10, 1900) was an American businessman, banker and politician. He served as a United States representative from New York and as a member of the New York State Assembly during the 1870s.

== Biography ==
Born in Canaan, New Hampshire, Burleigh was the son of Gordon Burleigh. He was raised in Concord, New Hampshire and attended the common schools. He moved to New York in 1846 with his parents, who settled in Ticonderoga. He engaged in the mining of iron ore and in the lumber, coal, and transportation business. He was supervisor of the town of Ticonderoga in 1864 and 1865 before moving to Whitehall, New York in 1867 to expand his transportation business. He owned many canalboats and steamers which he used to move freight through Canada and the U.S.

He was involved in the banking industry, serving as the president of the National Bank at Whitehall and the First National Bank of Ticonderoga. He was director of the International Paper Company, Ticonderoga Pulp and Paper Company, and the St. Maurice Lumber Company. He was also involved in real estate and owned large amounts of real estate in the U.S. and Canada.

== Political career ==
In 1855, he was secretary of the first Republican convention in New York. He was a member of the New York State Assembly (Washington Co., 2nd D.) in 1876. Burleigh was a delegate to the 1880, 1884, 1888, 1892 and 1896 Republican National Conventions.

He was elected as a Republican candidate to the 48th and 49th Congresses, holding office from March 4, 1883, to March 3, 1887. While in Congress, he served on the United States House Committee on Rivers and Harbors.

== Death ==
He died of appendicitis in Whitehall, New York on August 10, 1900, and was interred at the Mount Hope Cemetery in Ticonderoga, New York.

== Personal life ==
Burleigh married Jennie E. Richards in 1869, and they had three sons: Charles Richards Burleigh, Henry Gordon Burleigh Jr. and James Weeks Burleigh.

Burleigh's home in Ticonderoga, the H. G. Burleigh House, was built in 1894 and is a Queen Anne style building. It has been listed on the National Register of Historic Places since 1988.

New York State Assembly
Preceded by Emerson E. Davis	New York State Assembly; Washington County, 2nd District; 1876	Succeeded by Isaac V. Baker Jr.
U.S. House of Representatives
Preceded by Walter A. Wood	Member of the U.S. House of Representatives from New York's 17th congressional district 1883–1885	Succeeded by James G. Lindsley
Preceded by Frederick A. Johnson	Member of the U.S. House of Representatives from New York's 18th congressional district 1885–1887	Succeeded by Edward W. Greenman
