= John H. Starin =

American businessman

John Henry Starin
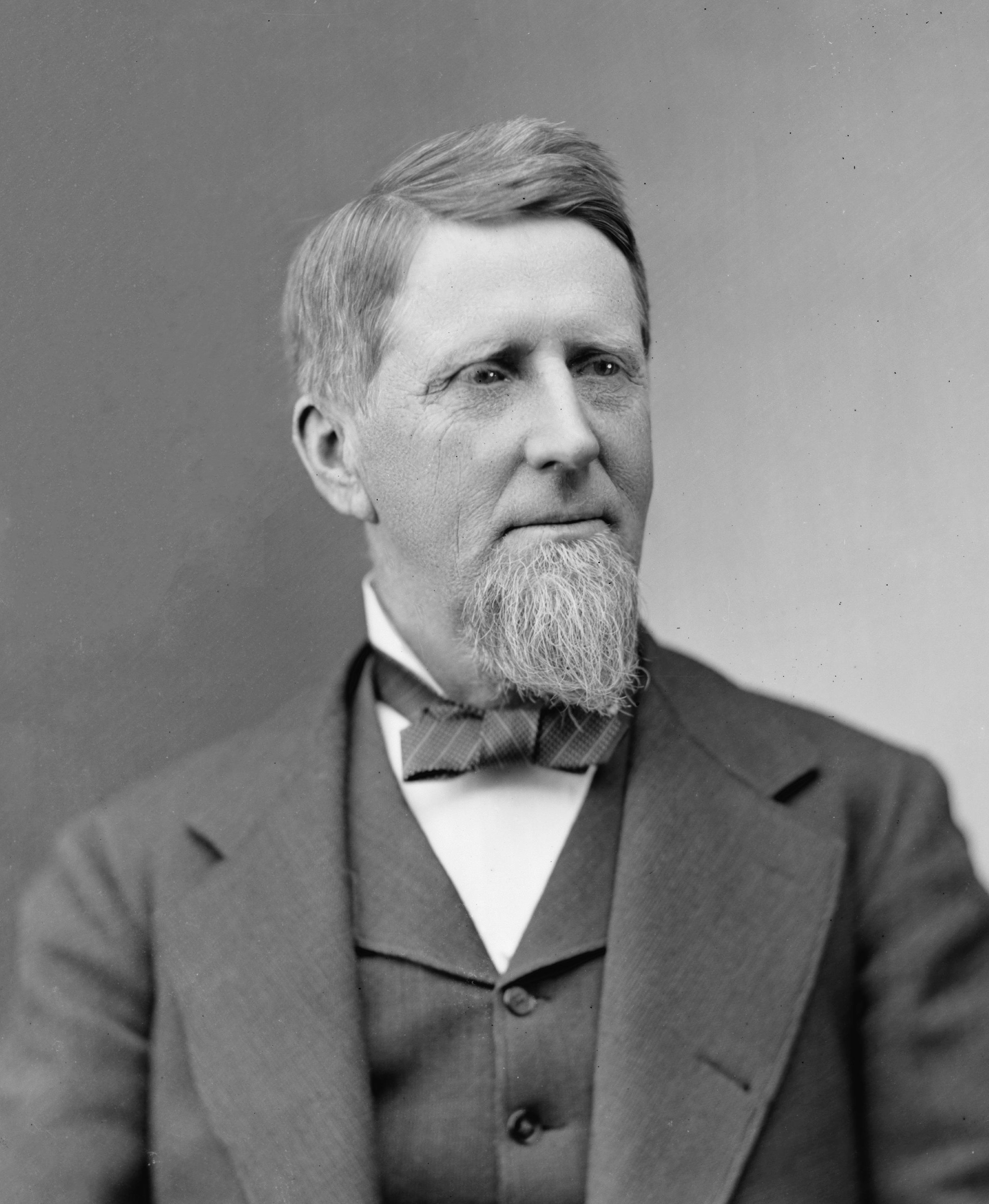

Member of the U.S. House of Representatives from New York's 20th district
- In office March 4, 1877 – March 3, 1881
- Preceded by: Henry H. Hathorn
- Succeeded by: George West

Mayor of Fultonville, New York
- In office 1862–1863
- Preceded by: Joesph M. Yates
- Succeeded by: J.A.O South

Personal details
- Born: August 27, 1825 Sammonsville, Fulton County, New York, U.S.
- Died: March 21, 1909 (aged 83) New York City, New York, U.S.
- Resting place: Fultonville Cemetery, Fultonville, New York, U.S.
- Party: Republican
- Relatives: Thomas Sammons (grandfather)

John Henry Starin (August 27, 1825 – March 21, 1909) was a successful entrepreneur and businessman notably in the logistics and amusement industries. In addition to serving as a U.S. representative from New York in Congress, he founded Starin's Glen Island Resort, America's first amusement park.

== Early life and education ==
Starin was born in Sammonsville, Fulton County (then a part of Montgomery County), New York. He was the grandson of Thomas Sammons. Starin pursued academic studies in Esperance, New York, where he began the study of medicine in 1842.

== Business career ==
He first established and operated a drug and medicine business in Fultonville, New York, from 1845 to 1858. From 1848–1852, he also served as Postmaster of Fultonville.

Starin entered the freight and logistics business as the founder and president of the Starin City River & Harbor Transportation Co.

By the mid 1870's Starin was considered the "heaviest operator in the freight business in the United States."

From 1883–1909, he served as president of Fultonville National Bank. He engaged in railroading and served as member of the New York City Rapid Transit Commission. Starin also director of the North River Bank, in New York City, and the Mohawk River National Bank.

== Public Service ==
Starin was elected as a Republican to the Forty-fifth and Forty-sixth Congresses (March 4, 1877 – March 3, 1881).

== Starin's Glen Island Resort ==
In 1878, Starin purchased a series of small islands off the coast of New Rochelle, New York, for his country estate and eventually turned the property into an amusement park called Starin's Glen Island. He maintained the islands as a select summer resort, operating 12 steamboats to and from New York City. The islands were so popular that hundreds of thousands of visitors were brought every season to the attractions which included a zoo, a natural history museum, a railway, a German beer garden (around the castle-like structure which still stands today), a bathing beach, and a Chinese pagoda. A chain ferry transported visitors from a mainland dock on Neptune Island.

By 1882, attendance reached half a million and within six years it broke a million. However, despite the large number of visitors, Starin stressed the well-behaved nature of the crowds and the orderly character of the experience, governed by a "middle-class code of conduct". His desire was to offer an environment of order and civility which contrasted to the rough-and-tumble atmosphere of New York City. One of the effects of Glen Island's popularity in the beginning of the twentieth century was the building boom in New Rochelle, which had rapidly grown into a summer resort community.

== The Starin Mausoleum ==
Starin Mausoleum in Fultonville Cemetery

The Starin Mausoleum was constructed in Fultonville Cemetery in the early 1880s. The building was approximately 50 feet tall, 33 feet across, and 24 feet deep. The Starin mausoleum no longer stands in Fultonville Cemetery, but remnants of the foundation can still be found.

When John H. Starin died in 1909, he left the ownership and the care of the mausoleum to the Starin Benevolent & Industrial Association, which ceased to exist in 1917. In the 1970s, the mausoleum began to fall into disrepair. Sometime around this time, it was also vandalized on Halloween by a group of teenagers, who destroyed most of the caskets and bodies.

In the summer of 1975 the mausoleum was taken down, the remains that were left in the mausoleum were re-interred in front of where it once stood, and markers were placed on the graves. At the time of the demolition there was very little left to the mausoleum. Today, a modest upright granite slab with a bronze face marks Starin's grave and those of his family members.

== Death ==
Starin died in New York City on March 21, 1909, at his residence on 9 West 38th St. in Manhattan. At his death he was likely the largest individual owner of steamboats, barges and tugboats in the United States. He was interred in The Starin Mausoleum, in Fultonville Cemetery, Fultonville.

== See also ==
- Gaylord Starin White
- Carrollcliffe

== Further reading and external links ==
- Hoffman, Malcolm (Music by). "A Trip To Glen Island". Youtube. Archived from the original on 2021-12-21.]
- "An 1881 Account of What it Was Like to Visit Starin's Glen Island Resort Off the Shores of New Rochelle and Pelham". Historic Pelham.
- United States Congress. "John H. Starin (id: S000808)". Biographical Directory of the United States Congress.

U.S. House of Representatives
Preceded by Henry H. Hathorn	Member of the U.S. House of Representatives from New York's 20th congressional district 1877–1881	Succeeded by George West
