= Steven Beckwith Ayres =

American politician (1861–1929)

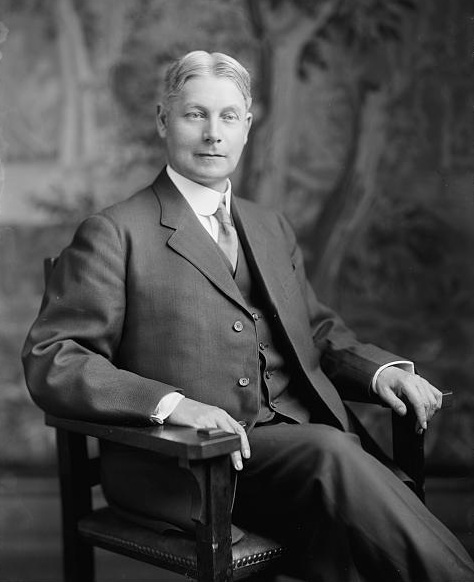

Member of the U.S. House of Representatives from New York's 18th district
- In office March 4, 1911 – March 3, 1913
- Preceded by: Joseph A. Goulden
- Succeeded by: Thomas G. Patten

Personal details
- Born: October 27, 1861 Fort Dodge, Iowa, United States
- Died: June 1, 1929 (aged 67) Clearwater, Florida
- Party: Democratic Party
- Spouse: Helen Ayres
- Education: Syracuse University
- Profession: publisher/editor; advertising agent; politician; orange grower; real estate agent

Steven Beckwith Ayres (October 27, 1861 – June 1, 1929) was an American politician and a U.S. representative from New York.

== Biography ==
Born in Fort Dodge, Iowa, Ayres was the son of Stephen and Artemisia (Dunlap) Ayres. He moved with his parents to Elmira, New York, in 1866, where he attended grammar school. He moved to Penn Yan, New York, in 1873, and attended the Penn Yan Academy. Ayres later graduated from Syracuse University in 1882.

He married his first wife, Harriet Margaret Bowers of Penn Yann, NY, in 1884. They had one son, Malcolm Beckwith Ayres (b.1886). His second wife, Helen Ayres (b.1869), was one of the founders of the Woman's National Democratic League (est.1896) in New York City. It was the first permanent national political organization exclusively established for and by women. They had one daughter, Janette.

== Career ==
Ayres worked in the publishing business at Penn Yan and became editor of the Yates County Chronicle. He served as delegate to the Republican State convention in 1884. In 1893, he moved to New York City, where he worked in advertising. He declined the Democratic nomination as candidate for the New York State Assembly in 1910.

He was elected as an Independent (non-Tammany) Democrat to represent Bronx district in the Sixty-second Congress in 1910. Ayres served one term from March 4, 1911, to March 3, 1913. In 1912 he was an unsuccessful candidate for reelection to the Sixty-third Congress.

Ayres wrote several books and many history articles, and lectured at the New York University Summer School in 1914.

He engaged in the cultivation of oranges at Clearwater, Florida, in winter and in the real estate business at Woodstock, New York, during the summer.

== Death ==
Steven Beckwith Ayres died on June 1, 1929, in Manhattan's Park West Hospital. He is interred at Clearwater Cemetery in Clearwater, Florida.

U.S. House of Representatives
Preceded by Joseph A. Goulden	Member of the U.S. House of Representatives from New York's 18th congressional district 1911–1913	Succeeded by Thomas G. Patten
