= Henry Wilbur Bentley =

American politician (1838–1907)

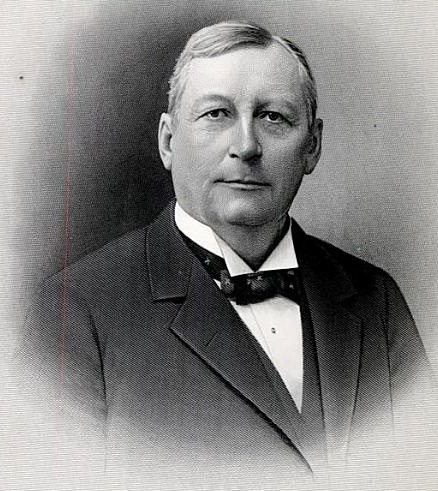

Member of the U.S. House of Representatives from New York's 23rd district
- In office March 4, 1891 – March 3, 1893
- Preceded by: James S. Sherman
- Succeeded by: John Madison Wever

Personal details
- Born: Henry Wilbur Bentley; September 30, 1838 DeRuyter, New York, U.S.
- Died: January 27, 1907 (aged 68) Boonville, New York, U.S.
- Resting place: Boonville Cemetery
- Party: Democratic
- Spouse: Mary M. Dickerman (m. 1862)
- Children: 1
- Profession: Teacher; lawyer; politician

Henry Wilbur Bentley (September 30, 1838 – January 27, 1907) was an American educator, lawyer, and politician who served one term as a U.S. representative from New York from 1891 to 1893.

== Biography ==
Henry Wilbur Bentley was born on September 30, 1838, in DeRuyter, Madison County, New York, to Zadock T. and Lucy Caroline (Gardner) Bentley. At the age of five, he moved with his parents to Morrisville, New York, attended Morrisville Union School, Yates Polytechnic Institute, and Judd's private school in Berkshire. Bentley taught school for several years and studied law at his father's office in Morrisville and with Judge Foster in Rome. He was managing clerk for Foster, Johnson, Boardman & Lynch in Rome. He was admitted to the bar in 1861.

== Career ==
Bentley commenced practicing law in Boonville, New York. He was associated in law with L. W. Fiske, A. L. Hayes and Thomas L. Jones. He served as chairman of the Oneida County Building Commission, and as president of the village of Boonville in 1874, from 1889 to 1891, and in 1899.

=== Congress ===
Bentley was elected as a Democrat to the Fifty-second Congress in the Democratic landslide of 1890, Bentley was U.S. Representative for the twenty-third district of New York from March 4, 1891 to March 3, 1893. He served on the railroads, canals and census committees. He defeated incumbent U.S. Representative James S. Sherman. He was an unsuccessful candidate for reelection in 1892 to the Fifty-third Congress when Sherman defeated him and reclaimed his old seat.

=== Later career ===
In 1894, Governor Roswell P. Flower appointed him surrogate of Oneida County.

Bentley continued the practice of law in Boonville until his death. He served as vice president of the Oneida County Bar Association from its organization and was a director of the New York State Bar Association. He was founder and vice president of the First National Bank of Boonville. He served as a commissioner during the Skaneateles water cases and served as chairman of the board to locate the new courthouse in Oneida County.

== Personal life ==
Bentley married Mary M. Dickerman, daughter of A. B. Dickerman, of Trumansburg, New York, on June 24, 1862. They had a daughter, Eleanor M. He was a 32nd degree Mason. He was a member of the Presbyterian Church in Boonville and became an elder of the search in 1888.

=== Death and burial ===
Bentley died of heart disease on January 27, 1907, in Boonville. He was buried in Boonville Cemetery.

U.S. House of Representatives
Preceded by James S. Sherman	Member of the U.S. House of Representatives from New York's 25th congressional district March 4, 1891 – March 3, 1893	Succeeded by John Madison Wever
