= Andrew Williams (American politician) =

American politician

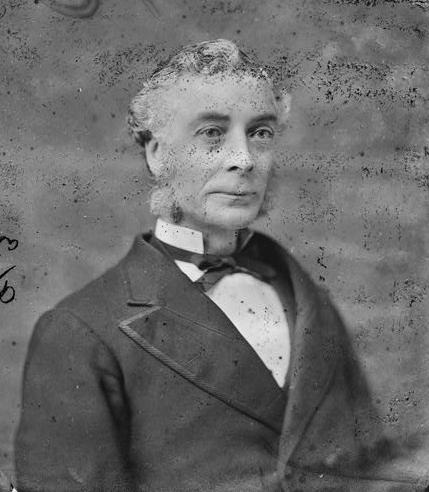

Member of the U.S. House of Representatives from New York's 18th district
- In office March 4, 1875 – March 3, 1879
- Preceded by: William A. Wheeler
- Succeeded by: John Hammond

Personal details
- Born: August 27, 1828 Ormstown, Lower Canada
- Died: October 6, 1907 (aged 79) Plattsburgh, New York, U.S.
- Party: Republican
- Profession: Politician, manufacturer, merchant, miner

Andrew Williams (August 27, 1828 – October 6, 1907) was an American politician, manufacturer, merchant and miner from the State of New York. From 1875 to 1879, he served two terms in the U.S. House of Representatives.

== Biography ==
Born in Ormstown in Lower Canada (in the modern-day Province of Quebec), Williams received a limited schooling as a child and later engaged in mercantile pursuits. He immigrated to the United States in 1852, settling in Plattsburgh, New York.

He engaged in manufacturing of nails from 1863 to 1865 and later engaged in iron ore mining, the lumber trade and in manufacturing of horseshoe nails and wagons.

=== Congress ===
Williams was elected as a Republican to the 44th and 45th United States Congresses, holding office from March 4, 1875, to March 3, 1879. He was one of the organizers of the Iron National Bank in Plattsburgh in 1881 and served as its president from 1881 to 1888.

=== Career after ===
He was Supervisor of the Town of Dannemora for two years; Supervisor of the Town of Plattsburgh for a number of years; Superintendent of the Plattsburgh Waterworks from 1889 to 1902; and Treasurer of Clinton County from 1891 to 1905.

=== Death and burial ===
Williams was a member of the Board of Education until his death in Plattsburgh on October 6, 1907. He was interred in Riverside Cemetery in Plattsburgh.

U.S. House of Representatives
Preceded by William A. Wheeler	Member of the U.S. House of Representatives from New York's 18th congressional district 1875–1879	Succeeded by John Hammond
