= Chauncey Vibbard =

American politician

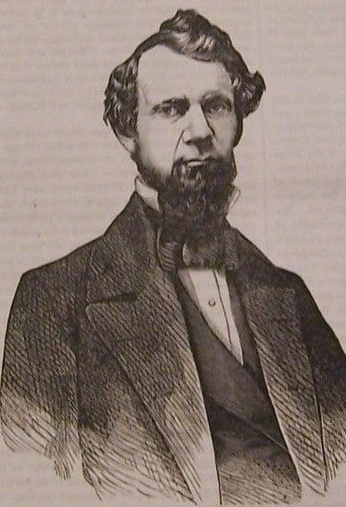
- From the April, 1860 edition of the American Phrenological Journal.

Member of the U.S. House of Representatives from New York's 18th district
- In office March 4, 1861 – March 3, 1863
- Preceded by: Clark B. Cochrane
- Succeeded by: James M. Marvin

Personal details
- Born: November 11, 1811 Galway, New York, United States
- Died: June 5, 1891 (aged 79) Macon, Georgia, United States
- Resting place: Riverside Cemetery, Macon, Georgia, United States
- Party: Democratic
- Occupation: Railroad executive

Chauncey Vibbard (November 11, 1811 – June 5, 1891) was an American railroad executive and a U.S. Representative from New York during the American Civil War.

== Early life ==
Born in Galway, New York, on November 11, 1811, Vibbard attended the common schools and graduated from Nott's Academy for Boys in Albany, New York (now The Albany Academy).

After graduation he served as clerk in a wholesale grocery store in Albany. He then moved to New York City, and in 1834 went to Montgomery, Alabama.

Upon returning to New York in 1836 Vibbard settled in Schenectady, and was appointed chief clerk of the Utica & Schenectady Railroad. He became a railroad freight and ticket agent in 1848.

In the early 1850s Vibbard was one of the businessmen who consolidated several small New York railroads into the New York Central Railroad. From 1853 to 1865 he was the New York Central's General Superintendent.

== Election to Congress and Civil War activities ==
Vibbard was elected as a Democrat to the Thirty-seventh Congress (March 4, 1861 – March 3, 1863). He declined to be a candidate for renomination in 1862.

During the American Civil War he served as the Union's director and superintendent of military railroads. In 1864 he was a supporter of George B. McClellan for President.

== Post Civil War ==
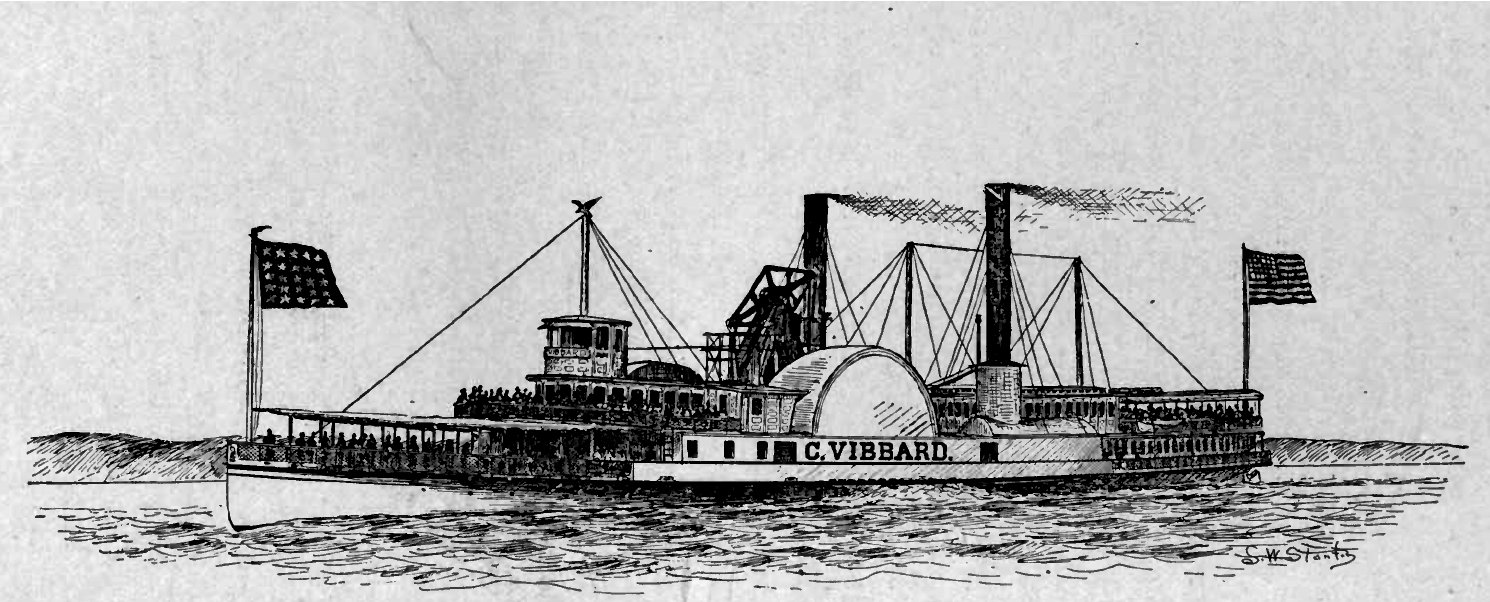
The steamboat Chauncey Vibbard, named after the subject

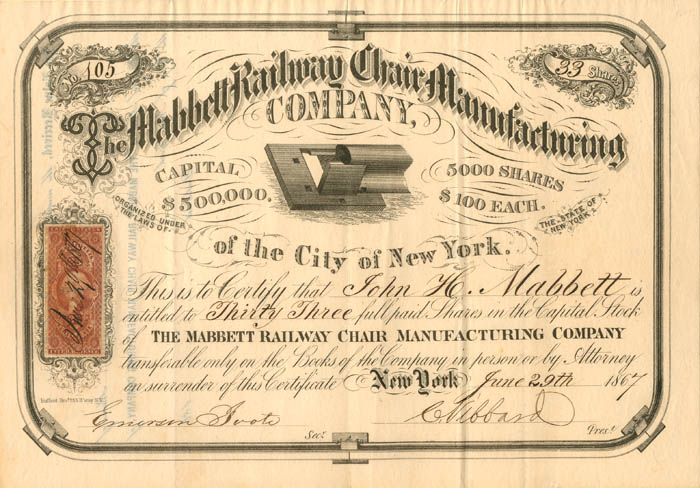
Mabbett Railway Chair Manufacturing Company share certificate, signed by Vibbard in June 1867

Following the war Vibbard continued his business career. He was an organizer of the Family Fund Insurance Company in 1864, and served as its President until 1886. He was also an owner of Foote, Vibbard & Co., a venture formed to provide supplies and equipment to railroads.

In 1865 he moved to New York City and became active in constructing and operating steamships lines and elevated railroads. He was a part-owner of the record-breaking Hudson River steamboat Chauncey Vibbard, which was named for him.

In his later life Vibbard was interested in the development of railroads in the former Confederacy, as well as several ventures in South and Central America.

Vibbard retired in 1889, and moved to Macon, Georgia, for his health. He died in Macon on June 5, 1891, and was interred in Macon's Riverside Cemetery.

Since 1907 his former home in Schenectady has been the location of the Mohawk Club, a private social club that began in the 1870s.

U.S. House of Representatives
Preceded by Clark B. Cochrane	Member of the U.S. House of Representatives from New York's 18th congressional district 1861–1863	Succeeded by James M. Marvin
