= George N. Southwick =

American journalist and politician

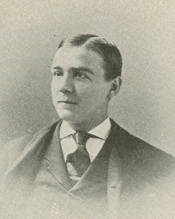
- From 1896's Illustrated Congressional Manual

Member of the U.S. House of Representatives from New York
- In office March 4, 1901 – March 3, 1911
- Preceded by: Martin H. Glynn
- Succeeded by: Henry S. De Forest
- Constituency: 20th district (1901–1903); 23rd district (1903–1911)
- In office March 4, 1895 – March 3, 1899
- Preceded by: Charles Tracey
- Succeeded by: Martin H. Glynn
- Constituency: 20th district

Personal details
- Born: George Newell Southwick; March 7, 1863 Albany, New York, U.S.
- Died: October 17, 1912 (aged 49) Albany, New York
- Resting place: Albany Rural Cemetery
- Party: Republican
- Education: Williams College
- Occupation: Journalist

George Newell Southwick (March 7, 1863 – October 17, 1912) was an American journalist and politician from Albany, New York. A Republican, he was most notable for his service as a U.S. representative from 1895 to 1911.

== Early life ==
George N. Southwick was born in Albany, New York on March 7, 1863, the son of Henry Collins Southwick and Margaret Julia (Fraser) Southwick. His extended family had been prominent in newspaper publishing and printing for several generations, and included Solomon Southwick (1773–1839) and Solomon Southwick (1731–1897).

Southwick attended Albany's School Number 6 as well as private schools in the city, and he graduated from Albany High School in 1879. He then attended Williams College in Williamstown, Massachusetts, from which he graduated in 1884. He attended the Albany Law School, but left before graduating so he could begin a career in journalism.

== Start of career ==
In 1885, Southwick began work as a reporter for the Albany Morning Express. From 1886 to 1888, he covered the state legislature for the Associated Press. In 1888 he became managing editor of Albany's Morning Express. In 1889 he was appointed managing editor of the Albany Evening Journal, where he worked until 1895. Southwick was also active in politics as a Republican and contributed numerous magazine and newspaper articles in support of Republican candidates. He supported James G. Blaine for president in 1884, and Benjamin Harrison in 1888, and gave speeches on their behalf throughout New York. Southwick was a longtime friend of party leaders William Barnes Jr. and James S. Sherman, which aided his entry into elective office.

== Continued career ==
In 1892, South was an unsuccessful candidate for the Republican nomination for U.S. Representative from New York's 20th District. In 1894, he was elected to the 54th Congress. He was reelected to the 55th Congresses and served from March 4, 1895, to March 3, 1899. In 1896, Southwick was chairman of the Republican State convention. He was a candidate for reelection to Congress in 1898, and lost to Martin H. Glynn.

In 1900, Southwick defeated Glynn for election to the 57th Congress. Following redistricting after the 1900 census, Southwick was reelected four times from the 23rd District. He served from March 4, 1901, to March 3, 1911, and was not a candidate for re-nomination in 1910. Southwick was chairman of the Committee on Education from the 58th through 60th Congresses. He was one of 14 representatives, all Republicans, to oppose the Sixteenth Amendment to the United States Constitution, which imposed a federal income tax.

== Retirement and death ==
Southwick invested profitably during his career, and his holdings included real estate in Washington, D.C., and mining properties in Essex County, New York. In retirement, he continued to reside in Albany. He died in Albany on October 17, 1912, and was buried at Albany Rural Cemetery in Menands.

== Family ==
Southwick never married and had no children. His sister Effie was the wife of Ralph W. Thomas, a member of the New York State Senate.

U.S. House of Representatives
Preceded by Charles Tracey	Member of the U.S. House of Representatives from New York's 20th congressional district 1895–1899	Succeeded by Martin H. Glynn
Preceded by Martin H. Glynn	Member of the U.S. House of Representatives from New York's 20th congressional district 1901–1903	Succeeded by Thomas W. Bradley
Preceded by Louis W. Emerson	Member of the U.S. House of Representatives from New York's 23rd congressional district 1903–1911	Succeeded by Henry S. De Forest
