= Thomas G. Patten =

American politician

Thomas Gedney Patten
- Born: September 12, 1861; New York City
- Died: February 23, 1939 (aged 77)
- Education: Mount Pleasant Academy, Columbia College, Columbia Law School
- Known for: President of the New York & Long Branch Steamboat Co., Postmaster of New York City
- Office: Member of the U.S. House of Representatives
- Political party: Democratic

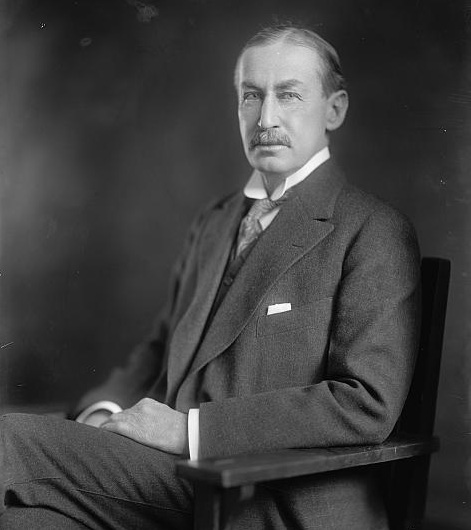
Thomas G. Patten

Thomas Gedney Patten (September 12, 1861 – February 23, 1939) was an American lawyer and politician who served three terms as a U.S. representative from New York from 1911 to 1917.

== Biography ==
He was born in New York City on September 12, 1861. Patten attended Mount Pleasant Academy, Ossining, New York, then Columbia College, New York City from 1877 to 1879, and Columbia Law School in 1880–1882.

=== Career ===
He engaged in the shipping business and subsequently operated a fleet of tugboats in New York Harbor. He served as president of the New York & Long Branch Steamboat Co.

==== Congress ====
Patten was elected as a Democrat to the Sixty-second, Sixty-third, and Sixty-fourth Congresses (March 4, 1911 – March 3, 1917). He was an unsuccessful candidate for reelection in 1916 to the Sixty-fifth Congress. He was the Postmaster of New York City from 1917 to 1921.

=== Later career and death ===
He moved to Hollywood, California, in 1922 and served on the staff of the Motion Picture Producers and Distributors of America, Inc., until 1924 when he retired.

He died in Hollywood, California, February 23, 1939. He was interred in Forest Lawn Memorial Park, Los Angeles, California.

== Reference and source ==
- United States Congress. "Thomas G. Patten (id: P000109)". Biographical Directory of the United States Congress.

U.S. House of Representatives
| Preceded by J. Van Vechten Olcott | Member of the U.S. House of Representatives from New York's 15th congressional district 1911–1913 | Succeeded by Michael F. Conry |
| Preceded by Stephen B. Ayres | Member of the U.S. House of Representatives from New York's 18th congressional district 1913–1917 | Succeeded by George B. Francis |
