= John H. Moffitt =

United States Army Medal of Honor recipient

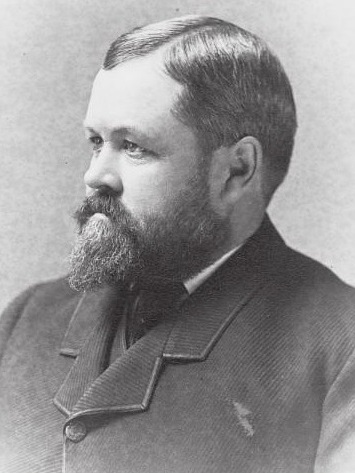
- Congressman, Medal of Honor recipient
- Born: January 8, 1843; Chazy, New York, US
- Died: August 14, 1926 (aged 83); Plattsburgh, New York, US
- Military career
- Allegiance: United States of America; Union
- Branch: United States Army; Union Army
- Service years: 1861 - 1863
- Rank: Sergeant
- Units: (New York (state)) Company C, 16th New York Volunteer Infantry Regiment
- Conflicts: Battle of Gaines' Mill
- Awards: Medal of Honor
- Other work: United States Representative from New York

John Henry Moffitt (January 8, 1843 – August 14, 1926) was a United States representative from New York and the recipient of the Medal of Honor for his actions during the Civil War.

== Biography ==
John Henry Moffitt was born near Chazy, Clinton County, New York and attended the district school and Plattsburgh Academy.

His brother was Civil War colonel and New York Assemblyman Stephen Moffitt.

During the American Civil War, he was enlisted as a Private in Company C, 16th New York Volunteer Infantry Regiment on April 27, 1861. He served until he was mustered out with the regiment on May 18, 1863. Moffitt attained the rank of Sergeant, and received the Medal of Honor for heroism at the Battle of Gaines's Mill.

After the war, he attended the Fort Edward Collegiate Institute and graduated in 1864.

In 1866 he worked as the deputy collector of customs at Rouses Point, New York until 1872. After that, he engaged in the manufacture of charcoal bloom iron in the Saranac hamlet of Moffitsville and in Belmont, Franklin (now Allegany) County, from 1872 to 1891;

In 1877, he was elected as a Saranac's Town Supervisor, which also made him a member of the Clinton County Board of Supervisors.

John Moffitt was elected as a Republican to the Fiftieth and Fifty-first Congresses (March 4, 1887 – March 3, 1891), but he was not a candidate for renomination in 1890.

After leaving the Congress, he became a manager at the Syracuse Street Railway Company from 1891 to 1899 and superintendent of the city water department from 1900 to 1902. He then moved to Plattsburgh to work as a Cashier at Plattsburgh National Bank, of which he became president in 1904.

Moffitt remained active in Republican politics as a chairman of the Clinton County Republican Committee and a member of the New York Republican State Committee. He was also a delegate to the 1912 Republican National Convention.

John Moffitt died in Plattsburgh and was buried in Plattsburgh's Mount Carmel Cemetery.

== Medal of Honor citation ==

Rank and Organization:

Corporal, Company C, 16th New York Infantry. Place and date: At Gaines Mill, Va., June 27, 1862. Entered service at: Plattsburgh, N.Y. Born. January 8, 1843, Chazy, Clinton County, N.Y. Date of issue: March 3, 1891.

Citation:

Voluntarily took up the regimental colors after several color bearers had been shot down and carried them until himself wounded.

== See also ==
- List of American Civil War Medal of Honor recipients: M–P

== Notes ==
U.S. House of Representatives
Preceded by Frederick A. Johnson	Member of the U.S. House of Representatives from New York's 21st congressional district 1887–1891	Succeeded by John M. Wever
