= New York's 18th congressional district =

U.S. House district for New York

Coordinates: 41°24′42″N 74°04′52″W

- Interactive map of district boundaries since January 3, 2025
- Representative: Pat Ryan; D–Gardiner
- Distribution: 81.48% urban; 18.52% rural
- Population (2025): 797,740
- Median household income: $93,454
- Ethnicity: 63.1% White; 18.1% Hispanic; 9.8% Black; 3.9% Two or more races; 3.1% Asian; 2.1% other
- Cook PVI: D+2

New York's 18th congressional district is a congressional district for the United States House of Representatives in New York’s Hudson Valley that contains some of the northern suburbs and exurbs of New York City. It is currently represented by Democrat Pat Ryan.

The 18th district includes all of Orange County, and most of Dutchess and Ulster Counties. The district includes the cities of Newburgh, Middletown, Kingston, and Poughkeepsie.

In the August 23, 2022 Democratic Party primary Ulster County executive Pat Ryan defeated Aisha Mills and Moses Mugulusi. On the same date Ryan also defeated Dutchess County executive Marc Molinaro (Republican) in a special election to fill a vacant seat in the district. The latter contest was seen as a victory in a bellwether district. In the November 8, 2022 general election Ryan defeated New York State Assembly member Republican Colin Schmitt.

Republican Molinaro ran in the New York's 19th congressional district in the November general election and defeated Democrat Josh Riley. Incumbent Sean Patrick Maloney changed his election district to the New York's 17th congressional district, after redistricting maps were announced.

== Recent election results from statewide races ==
| Year | Office | Results |
|---|---|---|
| 2008 | President | Obama 55% - 44% |
| 2012 | President | Obama 56% - 44% |
| 2016 | President | Clinton 48% - 47% |
| 2016 | Senate | Schumer 61% - 36% |
| 2018 | Senate | Gillibrand 59% - 41% |
| 2018 | Governor | Molinaro 48.4% - 48.0% |
| 2018 | Attorney General | James 54% - 42% |
| 2020 | President | Biden 54% - 45% |
| 2022 | Senate | Schumer 52% - 48% |
| 2022 | Governor | Zeldin 51% - 49% |
| 2022 | Attorney General | James 51% - 49% |
| 2022 | Comptroller | DiNapoli 53% - 47% |
| 2024 | President | Harris 51% - 48% |
| 2024 | Senate | Gillibrand 57% - 43% |

== History ==
2023–present:

All of Orange
Parts of Dutchess and Ulster

2013–2023: (map)

All of Orange and Putnam
Parts of Dutchess and Westchester

2003–2013:

Parts of Rockland, Westchester

1993–2003:

Parts of Bronx, Queens, Westchester

1983–1993:

Parts of Bronx

1913–1983:

Parts of Manhattan

1853–1873:

Montgomery

The 18th District was created in 1813. For many years, it was the upper Manhattan district. It was the east side Manhattan seat in the 1970s and then a Bronx district in the 1980s, Following the 1992 remap it became a Westchester-based district with narrow corridor through the Bronx and a large portion of central Queens. The 2002 remap gave those Queens areas to the 5th District and the 18th absorbed some Rockland areas due to the deconstruction of the old Orange-Rockland 20th District. In 2012, population lost in New York pushed the district further north, into the mid-Hudson Valley suburbs. From 2002 to 2013, the 18th district included most of Westchester County and part of Rockland County. It included Larchmont, Mamaroneck, New Rochelle, Ossining, the Town of Pelham, Scarsdale, Tarrytown, White Plains as well as most of New City and Yonkers.

The redrawn district is composed of the following percentages of voters of the 2003-2013 congressional districts: 1 percent from the 18th congressional district; 76 percent from the 19th congressional district; 2 percent from the 20th congressional district; and 21 percent from the 22nd congressional district.

From 2012 to 2020, the district was a presidential bellwether, voting for the winner each time.

== Counties, towns, and cities ==
For the 119th and successive Congresses (based on the districts drawn following the New York Court of Appeals' December 2023 decision in Hoffman v New York State Ind. Redistricting. Commn.), the district contains all or portions of the following counties, towns, and cities.

Dutchess County (20)

Amenia, Beacon, Beekman (part; also 17th; includes Chelsea Cove), Clinton, Dover, Fishkill, Hyde Park, LaGrange, Milan, North East, Pine Plains, Pleasant Valley, Poughkeepsie (city), Poughkeepsie (town), Red Hook, Rhinebeck (town), Stanford, Union Vale, Wappinger, Washington

Orange County (24)

All 24 towns and cities

Ulster County (11)

Esopus, Gardiner (part; also 19th; shared with Gardiner CDP), Kingston (city), Kingston (town), Lloyd, Marlborough, New Paltz (town), Plattekill, Saugerties (town), Ulster, Woodstock

== List of members representing the district ==
| Representative | Party | Years | Cong ress | Electoral history | Location |
|---|---|---|---|---|---|
District established March 4, 1813
| Moss Kent (LeRaysville) | Federalist | March 4, 1813 – March 3, 1817 | 13th 14th | Elected in 1812. Re-elected in 1814. [data missing] | 1813–1823; St. Lawrence, Jefferson and Lewis counties |
| David A. Ogden (Madrid) | Federalist | March 4, 1817 – March 3, 1819 | 15th | Elected in 1816. Lost re-election. | 1813–1823; St. Lawrence, Jefferson and Lewis counties |
| William Donnison Ford (Watertown) | Democratic-Republican | March 4, 1819 – March 3, 1821 | 16th | Elected in 1818. [data missing] | 1813–1823; St. Lawrence, Jefferson and Lewis counties |
| Vacant | | March 4, 1821 – December 3, 1821 | 17th | Elections were held in April 1821. It is unclear when results were announced or credentials issued. | 1813–1823; St. Lawrence, Jefferson and Lewis counties |
| Micah Sterling (Watertown) | Federalist | December 3, 1821 – March 3, 1823 | 17th | Elected in 1821. [data missing] | 1813–1823; St. Lawrence, Jefferson and Lewis counties |
| Henry C. Martindale (Sandy Hill) | Democratic-Republican | March 4, 1823 – March 3, 1825 | 18th 19th 20th 21st | Elected in 1822. Re-elected in 1824. Re-elected in 1826. Re-elected in 1828. [data missing] | 1823–1833; Washington County |
| Henry C. Martindale (Sandy Hill) | Anti-Jacksonian | March 4, 1825 – March 3, 1831 | 18th 19th 20th 21st | Elected in 1822. Re-elected in 1824. Re-elected in 1826. Re-elected in 1828. [data missing] | 1823–1833; Washington County |
| Nathaniel Pitcher (Sandy Hill) | Jacksonian | March 4, 1831 – March 3, 1833 | 22nd | Elected in 1830. [data missing] | 1823–1833; Washington County |
| Daniel Wardwell (Mannsville) | Jacksonian | March 4, 1833 – March 3, 1837 | 23rd 24th | Redistricted from the 20th district and re-elected in 1832. Re-elected in 1834. [data missing] | 1833–1843 [data missing] |
| Isaac H. Bronson (Watertown) | Democratic | March 4, 1837 – March 3, 1839 | 25th | Elected in 1836. [data missing] | 1833–1843 [data missing] |
| Thomas C. Chittenden (Adams) | Whig | March 4, 1839 – March 3, 1843 | 26th 27th | Elected in 1838. Re-elected in 1840. [data missing] | 1833–1843 [data missing] |
| Preston King (Ogdensburg) | Democratic | March 4, 1843 – March 3, 1847 | 28th 29th | Elected in 1842. Re-elected in 1844. [data missing] | 1843–1853 [data missing] |
| William Collins (Lowville) | Democratic | March 4, 1847 – March 3, 1849 | 30th | Elected in 1846. [data missing] | 1843–1853 [data missing] |
| Preston King (Ogdensburg) | Free Soil | March 4, 1849 – March 3, 1853 | 31st 32nd | Elected in 1848. Re-elected in 1850. [data missing] | 1843–1853 [data missing] |
| Peter Rowe (Schenectady) | Democratic | March 4, 1853 – March 3, 1855 | 33rd | Elected in 1852. [data missing] | 1853–1863 [data missing] |
| Thomas R. Horton (Fultonville) | Opposition | March 4, 1855 – March 3, 1857 | 34th | Elected in 1854. [data missing] | 1853–1863 [data missing] |
| Clark B. Cochrane (Schenectady) | Republican | March 4, 1857 – March 3, 1861 | 35th 36th | Elected in 1856. Re-elected in 1858. [data missing] | 1853–1863 [data missing] |
| Chauncey Vibbard (Schenectady) | Democratic | March 4, 1861 – March 3, 1863 | 37th | Elected in 1860. [data missing] | 1853–1863 [data missing] |
| James M. Marvin (Saratoga Springs) | Republican | March 4, 1863 – March 3, 1869 | 38th 39th 40th | Elected in 1862. Re-elected in 1864. Re-elected in 1866. [data missing] | 1863–1873 [data missing] |
| Stephen Sanford (Amsterdam) | Republican | March 4, 1869 – March 3, 1871 | 41st | Elected in 1868. [data missing] | 1863–1873 [data missing] |
| John M. Carroll (Johnstown) | Democratic | March 4, 1871 – March 3, 1873 | 42nd | Elected in 1870. [data missing] | 1863–1873 [data missing] |
| William A. Wheeler (Malone) | Republican | March 4, 1873 – March 3, 1875 | 43rd | Elected in 1872. Redistricted to the 19th district. | 1873–1883 [data missing] |
| Andrew Williams (Plattsburg) | Republican | March 4, 1875 – March 3, 1879 | 44th 45th | Elected in 1874. Re-elected in 1876. [data missing] | 1873–1883 [data missing] |
| John Hammond (Crown Point) | Republican | March 4, 1879 – March 3, 1883 | 46th 47th | Elected in 1878. Re-elected in 1880. [data missing] | 1873–1883 [data missing] |
| Frederick A. Johnson (Glens Falls) | Republican | March 4, 1883 – March 3, 1885 | 48th | Elected in 1882. Redistricted to the 21st district. | 1883–1893 [data missing] |
| Henry G. Burleigh (Whitehall) | Republican | March 4, 1885 – March 3, 1887 | 49th | Redistricted from the 17th district and re-elected in 1884. [data missing] | 1883–1893 [data missing] |
| Edward W. Greenman (Troy) | Democratic | March 4, 1887 – March 3, 1889 | 50th | Elected in 1886. [data missing] | 1883–1893 [data missing] |
| John A. Quackenbush (Stillwater) | Republican | March 4, 1889 – March 3, 1893 | 51st 52nd | Elected in 1888. Re-elected in 1890. [data missing] | 1883–1893 [data missing] |
| Jacob LeFever (New Paltz) | Republican | March 4, 1893 – March 3, 1897 | 53rd 54th | Elected in 1892. Re-elected in 1894. [data missing] | 1893–1903 [data missing] |
| John H. Ketcham (Dover Plains) | Republican | March 4, 1897 – March 3, 1903 | 55th 56th 57th | Elected in 1896. Re-elected in 1898. Re-elected in 1900. Redistricted to the 21st district. | 1893–1903 [data missing] |
| Joseph A. Goulden (The Bronx) | Democratic | March 4, 1903 – March 3, 1911 | 58th 59th 60th 61st | Elected in 1902. Re-elected in 1904. Re-elected in 1906. Re-elected in 1908. [data missing] | 1903–1913 [data missing] |
| Stephen B. Ayres (New York) | Independent Democrat | March 4, 1911 – March 3, 1913 | 62nd | Elected in 1910. [data missing] | 1903–1913 [data missing] |
| Thomas G. Patten (New York) | Democratic | March 4, 1913 – March 3, 1917 | 63rd 64th | Redistricted from the 15th district and re-elected in 1912. Re-elected in 1914. [data missing] | 1913–1933 [data missing] |
| George B. Francis (New York) | Republican | March 4, 1917 – March 3, 1919 | 65th | Elected in 1916 [data missing] | 1913–1933 [data missing] |
| John F. Carew (New York) | Democratic | March 4, 1919 – December 28, 1929 | 66th 67th 68th 69th 70th 71st | Redistricted from the 17th district and re-elected in 1918. Re-elected in 1920. Re-elected in 1922. Re-elected in 1924. Re-elected in 1926. Re-elected in 1928. Resigned to become justice in Supreme Court of New York. | 1913–1933 [data missing] |
| Vacant | | December 28, 1929 – April 11, 1930 | 71st | | 1913–1933 [data missing] |
| Martin J. Kennedy (New York) | Democratic | April 11, 1930 – January 3, 1945 | 71st 72nd 73rd 74th 75th 76th 77th 78th | Elected to finish Carew's term. Re-elected in 1930. Re-elected in 1932. Re-elected in 1934. Re-elected in 1936. Re-elected in 1938. Re-elected in 1940. Re-elected in 1942. [data missing] | 1913–1933 [data missing] |
| Martin J. Kennedy (New York) | Democratic | April 11, 1930 – January 3, 1945 | 71st 72nd 73rd 74th 75th 76th 77th 78th | Elected to finish Carew's term. Re-elected in 1930. Re-elected in 1932. Re-elected in 1934. Re-elected in 1936. Re-elected in 1938. Re-elected in 1940. Re-elected in 1942. [data missing] | 1933–1943 [data missing] |
| Martin J. Kennedy (New York) | Democratic | April 11, 1930 – January 3, 1945 | 71st 72nd 73rd 74th 75th 76th 77th 78th | Elected to finish Carew's term. Re-elected in 1930. Re-elected in 1932. Re-elected in 1934. Re-elected in 1936. Re-elected in 1938. Re-elected in 1940. Re-elected in 1942. [data missing] | 1943–1953 [data missing] |
| Vito Marcantonio (New York) | American Labor | January 3, 1945 – January 3, 1951 | 79th 80th 81st | Redistricted from the 20th district and re-elected in 1944. Re-elected in 1946. Re-elected in 1948. [data missing] | 1943–1953 [data missing] |
| James G. Donovan (New York) | Democratic | January 3, 1951 – January 3, 1957 | 82nd 83rd 84th | Elected in 1950. Re-elected in 1952. Re-elected in 1954. [data missing] | 1943–1953 [data missing] |
| James G. Donovan (New York) | Democratic | January 3, 1951 – January 3, 1957 | 82nd 83rd 84th | Elected in 1950. Re-elected in 1952. Re-elected in 1954. [data missing] | 1953–1963 [data missing] |
| Alfred E. Santangelo (New York) | Democratic | January 3, 1957 – January 3, 1963 | 85th 86th 87th | Elected in 1956. Re-elected in 1958. Re-elected in 1960. [data missing] | 1953–1963 [data missing] |
| Adam Clayton Powell Jr. (New York) | Democratic | January 3, 1963 – January 3, 1971 | 88th 89th 90th 91st | Redistricted from the 16th district and re-elected in 1962. Re-elected in 1964. Re-elected in 1966. Re-elected in 1968. Lost re-nomination. | 1963–1973 [data missing] |
| Charles Rangel (New York) | Democratic | January 3, 1971 – January 3, 1973 | 92nd | Elected in 1970. Redistricted to the 19th district. | 1963–1973 [data missing] |
| Ed Koch (New York) | Democratic | January 3, 1973 – December 31, 1977 | 93rd 94th 95th | Redistricted from the 17th district and re-elected in 1972. Re-elected in 1974. Re-elected in 1976. Resigned to become Mayor of New York City. | 1973–1983 [data missing] |
| Vacant | | January 1, 1978 – February 13, 1978 | 95th | | 1973–1983 [data missing] |
| Bill Green (New York) | Republican | February 14, 1978 – January 3, 1983 | 95th 96th 97th | Elected to finish Koch's term. Re-elected in 1978. Re-elected in 1980. Redistricted to the 15th district. | 1973–1983 [data missing] |
| Robert Garcia (The Bronx) | Democratic | January 3, 1983 – January 7, 1990 | 98th 99th 100th 101st | Redistricted from the 21st district and re-elected in 1982. Re-elected in 1984. Re-elected in 1986. Re-elected in 1988. Resigned. | 1983–1993 [data missing] |
| Vacant | | January 8, 1990 – March 19, 1990 | 101st | | 1983–1993 [data missing] |
| José E. Serrano (The Bronx) | Democratic | March 20, 1990 – January 3, 1993 | 101st 102nd | Elected to finish Garcia's term. Re-elected in 1990. Redistricted to the 16th district. | 1983–1993 [data missing] |
| Nita Lowey (Harrison) | Democratic | January 3, 1993 – January 3, 2013 | 103rd 104th 105th 106th 107th 108th 109th 110th 111th 112th | Redistricted from the 20th district and re-elected in 1992. Re-elected in 1994. Re-elected in 1996. Re-elected in 1998. Re-elected in 2000. Re-elected in 2002. Re-elected in 2004. Re-elected in 2006. Re-elected in 2008. Re-elected in 2010. Redistricted to the 17th district. | 1993–2003 [data missing] |
| Nita Lowey (Harrison) | Democratic | January 3, 1993 – January 3, 2013 | 103rd 104th 105th 106th 107th 108th 109th 110th 111th 112th | Redistricted from the 20th district and re-elected in 1992. Re-elected in 1994. Re-elected in 1996. Re-elected in 1998. Re-elected in 2000. Re-elected in 2002. Re-elected in 2004. Re-elected in 2006. Re-elected in 2008. Re-elected in 2010. Redistricted to the 17th district. | 2003–2013 |
| Sean Patrick Maloney (Cold Spring) | Democratic | January 3, 2013 – January 3, 2023 | 113th 114th 115th 116th 117th | Elected in 2012. Re-elected in 2014. Re-elected in 2016. Re-elected in 2018. Re-elected in 2020. Redistricted to the 17th district and lost re-election. | 2013–2023 |
| Pat Ryan (Gardiner) | Democratic | January 3, 2023 – present | 118th 119th | Redistricted from the 19th district and re-elected in 2022. Re-elected in 2024. Re-elected in 2026. | 2023–2025; Catskills and mid-Hudson Valley region |
| Pat Ryan (Gardiner) | Democratic | January 3, 2023 – present | 118th 119th | Redistricted from the 19th district and re-elected in 2022. Re-elected in 2024. Re-elected in 2026. | 2025–present Catskills and mid-Hudson Valley region |

== Recent election results ==
Note that in New York State electoral politics there are numerous minor parties at various points on the political spectrum. Certain parties will invariably endorse either the Republican or Democratic candidate for every office, hence the state electoral results contain both the party votes, and the final candidate votes (Listed as "Recap").

=== 1996 ===
1996 New York's 18th congressional district election
| Party | Candidate | Votes | % | ±% |
|---|---|---|---|---|
| Democratic | Nita Lowey (Incumbent) | 118,194 | 63.6% | |
| Republican | Kerry J. Katsorhis | 59,487 | 32.0% | |
| Independence | Concetta M. Ferrara | 4,283 | 2.3% | |
| Right to Life | Florence T. O'Grady | 3,758 | 2.0% | |
| Majority | | 58,707 | 31.6% | |
| Turnout | | 185,722 | 100% | |

=== 1998 ===
1998 New York's 18th congressional district election
| Party | Candidate | Votes | % | ±% |
|---|---|---|---|---|
| Democratic | Nita Lowey (Incumbent) | 91,623 | 82.8% | +19.2% |
| Conservative | Daniel McMahon | 12,594 | 11.4% | +11.4% |
| Independence | Giulio A. Cavallo | 3,251 | 2.9% | +0.6% |
| Right to Life | Marion M. Conner | 3,234 | 2.9% | +0.9% |
| Majority | | 79,029 | 71.4% | +39.8% |
| Turnout | | 110,702 | 100% | −40.4% |

=== 2000 ===
2000 New York's 18th congressional district election
| Party | Candidate | Votes | % | ±% |
|---|---|---|---|---|
| Democratic | Nita Lowey (Incumbent) | 126,878 | 67.3% | −15.5% |
| Republican | John G. Vonglis | 58,022 | 30.8% | +30.8% |
| Right to Life | Florence T. O'Grady | 3,747 | 2.0% | −0.9% |
| Majority | | 68,856 | 36.5% | +34.9% |
| Turnout | | 188,647 | 100% | +70.4% |

=== 2002 ===
2002 New York's 18th congressional district election
| Party | Candidate | Votes | % | ±% |
|---|---|---|---|---|
| Democratic | Nita Lowey (Incumbent) | 98,957 | 92.0% | +24.7% |
| Right to Life | Michael J. Reynolds | 8,558 | 8.0% | +6.0% |
| Majority | | 90,399 | 84.1% | +47.6% |
| Turnout | | 107,515 | 100% | −43.0% |

=== 2004 ===
2004 New York's 18th congressional district election
| Party | Candidate | Votes | % | ±% |
|---|---|---|---|---|
| Democratic | Nita Lowey (Incumbent) | 170,715 | 69.8% | −22.2% |
| Republican | Richard A. Hoffman | 73,975 | 30.2% | +30.2% |
| Majority | | 96,740 | 39.5% | −44.6% |
| Turnout | | 244,690 | 100% | +127.6% |

=== 2006 ===
2006 New York's 18th congressional district election
| Party | Candidate | Votes | % | ±% |
|---|---|---|---|---|
| Democratic | Nita Lowey (Incumbent) | 124,256 | 70.7% | +0.9% |
| Republican | Richard A. Hoffman | 51,450 | 29.3% | −0.9% |
| Majority | | 72,806 | 41.4% | +1.9% |
| Turnout | | 175,706 | 100% | −28.2% |

=== 2008 ===
2008 New York's 18th congressional district election
| Party | Candidate | Votes | % | ±% |
|---|---|---|---|---|
| Democratic | Nita Lowey (Incumbent) | 174,791 | 68.5% | −2.2% |
| Republican | Jim Russell | 80,498 | 29.3% | −0.9% |
| Majority | | 94,293 | 41.4% | +29.5% |
| Turnout | | 255,289 | 100% | +45.3% |

=== 2010 ===
2010 New York's 18th congressional district election
| Party | Candidate | Votes | % | ±% |
|---|---|---|---|---|
| Democratic | Nita Lowey (Incumbent) | 114,810 | 58.2% | −10.3% |
| Republican | Jim Russell | 70,015 | 35.5% | +6.2% |
| Majority | | 44,795 | 22.7% | −18.7% |
| Turnout | | 197,212 | 100% | −23.8% |

=== 2012 ===
2012 New York's 18th congressional district election
| Party | Candidate | Votes | % | ±% |
|---|---|---|---|---|
| Democratic | Sean Patrick Maloney | 130,462 | 51.7% | −6.5 |
| Republican | Nan Hayworth (Incumbent) | 121,911 | 48.3% | +12.8 |
| Majority | | 8,551 | 3.5% | −19.2 |
| Turnout | | 252,373 | 100% | +21.9 |
| Democratic gain from Republican | | | | |

=== 2014 ===
2014 New York's 18th congressional district election
| Party | Candidate | Votes | % | ±% |
|---|---|---|---|---|
| Democratic | Sean Patrick Maloney (Incumbent) | 84,415 | 47.6% | −4.1 |
| Republican | Nan Hayworth | 81,625 | 46.0% | −2.3 |
| Send Mr. Smith | Scott Smith | 4,924 | 2.3% | +2.3% |
| Majority | | 2,790 | 1.6% | −1.9 |
| Turnout | | 177,424 | 100% | −29.7 |

=== 2016 ===
2016 New York's 18th congressional district election
| Party | Candidate | Votes | % | ±% |
|---|---|---|---|---|
| Democratic | Sean Patrick Maloney (Incumbent) | 162,060 | 55.6% | +8.0 |
| Republican | Phil Oliva | 129,369 | 44.0% | −1.6 |
| Majority | | 32,691 | 11.6% | +10.0 |
| Turnout | | 291,429 | 100% | +64.4 |

=== 2018 ===
2018 New York's 18th congressional district election
| Party | Candidate | Votes | % | ±% |
|---|---|---|---|---|
| Democratic | Sean Patrick Maloney (Incumbent) | 139,564 | 55.5% | −0.1 |
| Republican | James O'Donnell | 112,035 | 44.5% | +0.5 |
| Majority | | 27,529 | 11.0% | −0.6 |
| Turnout | | 251,599 | 100% | −13.8 |

=== 2020 ===
2020 New York's 18th congressional district election
| Party | Candidate | Votes | % |
|---|---|---|---|
| Democratic | Sean Patrick Maloney | 170,899 | 51.0 |
| Working Families | Sean Patrick Maloney | 12,914 | 3.8 |
| Independence | Sean Patrick Maloney | 3,356 | 1.0 |
| Total | Sean Patrick Maloney (incumbent) | 187,169 | 55.8 |
| Republican | Chele Farley | 128,568 | 38.3 |
| Conservative | Chele Farley | 16,530 | 4.9 |
| Total | Chele Farley | 145,098 | 43.2 |
| Libertarian | Scott Smith | 2,686 | 0.8 |
| SAM | Scott Smith | 476 | 0.2 |
| Total | Scott Smith | 3,162 | 1.0 |
| Total votes | | 335,429 | 100.0 |
| Democratic hold | | | |

=== 2022 ===
2022 New York's 18th congressional district election
| Party | Candidate | Votes | % |
|---|---|---|---|
| Democratic | Pat Ryan | 123,168 | 46.15 |
| Working Families | Pat Ryan | 12,077 | 4.52 |
| Total | Pat Ryan (incumbent) | 135,245 | 50.67 |
| Republican | Colin Schmitt | 116,972 | 43.83 |
| Conservative | Colin Schmitt | 14,681 | 5.50 |
| Total | Colin Schmitt | 131,653 | 49.33 |
| Total votes | | 266,398 | 100.0 |
| Democratic hold | | | |

=== 2024 ===
2024 New York's 18th congressional district election
| Party | Candidate | Votes | % |
|---|---|---|---|
| Democratic | Pat Ryan | 189,345 | 52.3 |
| Working Families | Pat Ryan | 17,761 | 4.9 |
| Total | Pat Ryan (incumbent) | 207,106 | 57.2 |
| Republican | Alison Esposito | 138,409 | 38.2 |
| Conservative | Alison Esposito | 16,720 | 4.6 |
| Total | Alison Esposito | 155,129 | 42.8 |
| Total votes | | 362,235 | 100.0 |
| Democratic hold | | | |

== See also ==
- List of United States congressional districts
- New York's congressional delegations
- New York's congressional districts
