= Fultonville Cemetery =

Cemetery in Montgomery County, New York

Coordinates: 42°56′39″N 74°22′26″W

Memorial Plaque

Starin Mausoleum in Fultonville Cemetery

Fultonville Cemetery, also known as the Old Village Cemetery or the Protestant Dutch Church Burying Ground, is a cemetery in Fultonville, New York. The cemetery was originally the burying ground for the Protestant Dutch Church of Fultonville, but was transferred to the village in 1848.

Many influential people in Fultonville's history are buried there. John H. Starin and Thomas R. Horton, United States House of Representatives|U.S. Representatives from New York, are interred there.

== The Starin Mausoleum ==
The Starin Mausoleum was constructed in Fultonville Cemetery in the early 1880s. The building was approximately 50 feet tall, 33 feet across, and 24 feet deep. The Starin Mausoleum no longer stands in Fultonville Cemetery, but remnants of the foundation can still be found.

When John H. Starin died in 1909, he left the ownership and the care of the mausoleum to the Starin Benevolent & Industrial Association, which ceased to exist in 1917.

In the 1970s, the mausoleum began to fall into disrepair. Sometime around this time, it was also vandalized on Halloween, by a group of teenagers who destroyed most of the caskets and bodies.

In the summer of 1975 the mausoleum was taken down, the remains that were left in the mausoleum were re-interred in front of where it once stood, and markers were placed on the graves. At the time of the demolition there was very little left to the mausoleum. Today, a modest upright granite slab with a bronze face marks Starin's grave and those of his family members.

== Natural burial ground ==
In 2013, a section of Fultonville Cemetery was dedicated to "green" or natural burials, wherein bodies are buried shortly after death, without embalming, wrapped in shrouds or in wooden coffins that can decompose naturally.
