= Peter Rowe (politician) =

American politician (1807–1876)

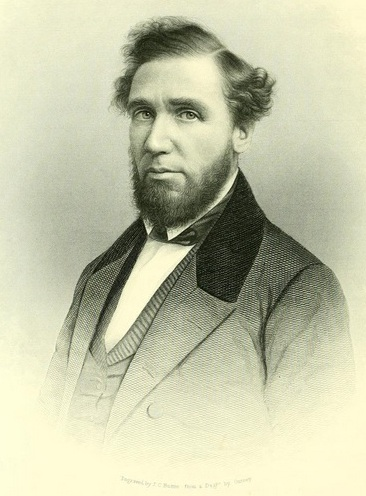

Member of the U.S. House of Representatives from New York's 18th district
- In office March 4, 1853 – March 3, 1855
- Preceded by: Preston King
- Succeeded by: Thomas R. Horton

Mayor of Schenectady, New York
- In office 1846–1850

Personal details
- Born: March 10, 1807 Crescent, New York, U.S.
- Died: April 17, 1876 (aged 69) Schenectady, New York, U.S.
- Resting place: Vale Cemetery, Schenectady, New York, U.S.
- Party: Democratic
- Profession: Politician, businessman

Peter Rowe (March 10, 1807 – April 17, 1876) was an American businessman and politician who served one term as a United States representative from New York from 1853 to 1855.

== Biography ==
Born in Crescent, New York, Rowe completed preparatory studies and graduated from Schenectady Academy in Schenectady, New York. He engaged in mercantile pursuits and became the chief auditor of the New York Central Railroad. He served as mayor of Schenectady from 1846 to 1850.

=== Congress ===
Rowe was elected as a Democrat to the Thirty-third Congress (March 4, 1853 – March 3, 1855).

=== Death and burial ===
He died in Schenectady on April 17, 1876, and was interred there in Vale Cemetery.

== Sources ==
- United States Congress. "Peter Rowe (id: R000477)". Biographical Directory of the United States Congress.

U.S. House of Representatives
Preceded by Preston King	Member of the U.S. House of Representatives from New York's 18th congressional district 1853–1855	Succeeded by Thomas R. Horton
