= H. G. Burleigh House =

Historic house in New York, United States

- U.S. National Register of Historic Places
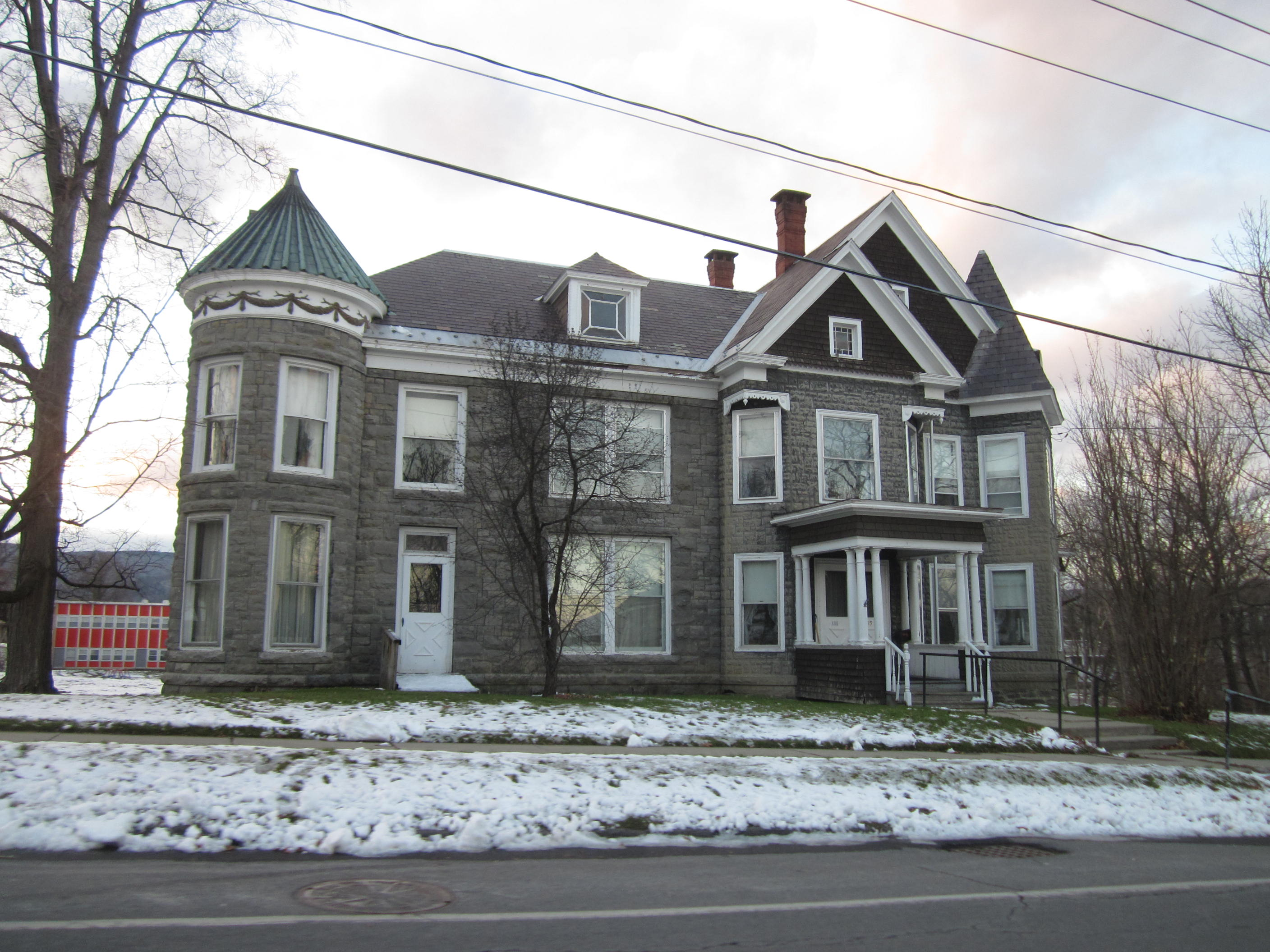
- H. G. Burleigh House, December 2011

- Location within New York Location within the United States
- Location: 307 Champlain Ave., Ticonderoga, New York
- Coordinates: 43°50′45″N 73°25′27″W
- Area: 0.8 acres (0.32 ha)
- Built: 1894
- Architect: Remington, C.G; Remington, S.B.
- Architectural style: Queen Anne
- MPS: Ticonderoga MRA
- NRHP reference No.: 88002192
- Added to NRHP: November 15, 1988

H. G. Burleigh House is a historic home located at Ticonderoga in Essex County, New York. The home was originally owned by U.S. Congressman Henry G. Burleigh, and was built in 1894 and enlarged in 1905. It is a 2 1/2-story, irregularly massed stone and concrete veneer Queen Anne–style building with Colonial Revival features. It is a 2 1/2-story, rectangular, gable-roofed structure built of brick. It features a central Palladian window at the second level. It features complex massing, molded chimneys, multiple roofs, corner towers, as well as classical columned and shingle-sheathed porches.

It was listed on the National Register of Historic Places in 1988.
