= James M. Marvin =

American politician (1809–1901)

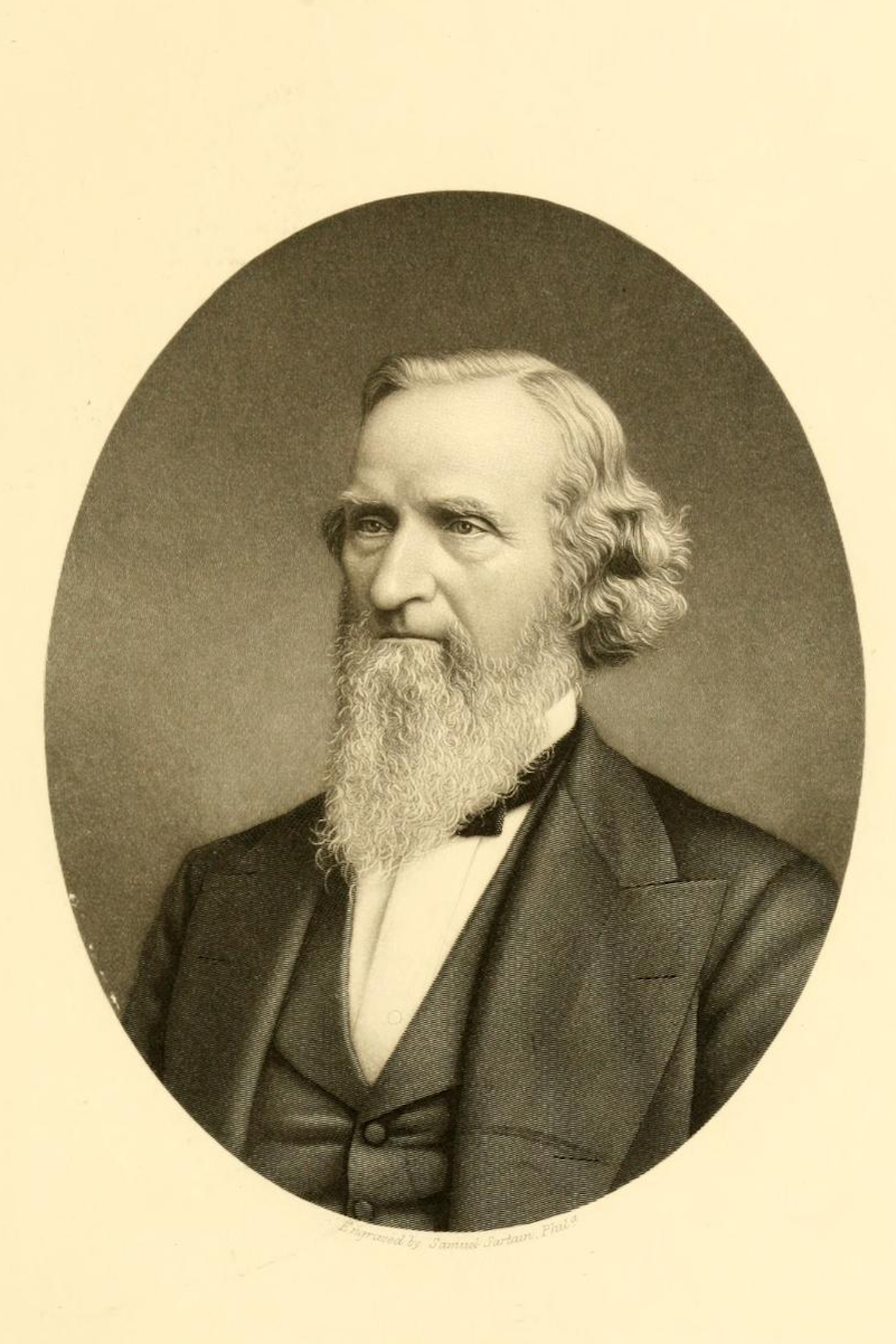

Member of the U.S. House of Representatives from New York's 18th district
- In office March 4, 1863 – March 3, 1869
- Preceded by: Chauncey Vibbard
- Succeeded by: Stephen Sanford

Member of the New York State Assembly
- In office January 1, 1846 – December 31, 1846

Personal details
- Born: James Madison Marvin; February 27, 1809 Ballston, New York, U.S.
- Died: April 25, 1901 (aged 92) Saratoga Springs, New York, U.S.
- Resting place: Greenridge Cemetery, Saratoga Springs, New York, U.S.
- Party: Republican
- Other political affiliations: Whig
- Spouse: Rhoby H. Barnum (m. 1838)
- Children: 5
- Relatives: Thomas J. Marvin (brother)
- Occupation: Politician, businessman

James Madison Marvin (February 27, 1809 – April 25, 1901) was a businessman and U.S. Representative from New York during the latter half of the American Civil War.

== Early life ==
Marvin was born in Ballston, New York. He was the son of William Marvin and Mary Benedict Marvin, and the brother and later business partner of Thomas J. Marvin, Saratoga County judge and member of the New York State Assembly in 1833. Marvin attended the common schools. He moved to Saratoga Springs, New York, in 1828.

== Marriage and children ==
In 1838 he married Rhoby H. Barnum. The couple had five children: a son, William, who died at age nine in 1855, and four daughters, Mary, Frances, Caroline, and Rhobie, who were still living as of 1878

== Career ==
He engaged in the hotel business in Saratoga Springs and Albany, New York. In 1839 he became one of the proprietors of the United States Hotel in Saratoga Springs. He was an employer and friend of Solomon Northup who was kidnapped and forced into slavery in 1841. In 1852, Northup had a letter sent by Samuel Bass explaining his circumstances and the need to have proof of his freedom to be freed.

He was a Whig member of the New York State Assembly (Saratoga Co.) in 1846. He served as a member of the board of supervisors of Saratoga County and served as chairman of the board in 1845, 1857, 1862, and 1874.

In 1859, he was elected to the first board of trustees of the Saratoga Monument Association, charged with building a monument on the site of Burgoyne's surrender in 1777.

Marvin was elected as a Republican to the Thirty-eighth, Thirty-ninth, and Fortieth Congresses (March 4, 1863 – March 4, 1869). He served as chairman of the Committee on Expenditures in the Department of the Treasury (Thirty-ninth and Fortieth Congresses). He was not a candidate for renomination.

He founded and served as president of the First National Bank of Saratoga Springs, New York. He served as director of the Schenectady and Saratoga Railroad and of the New York Central Railroad. He died at Saratoga Springs, New York, April 25, 1901, and was interred in Greenridge Cemetery.

U.S. House of Representatives
Preceded by Chauncey Vibbard	Member of the U.S. House of Representatives from New York's 18th congressional district 1863–1869	Succeeded by Stephen Sanford
