= Henry S. De Forest =

American politician (1847–1917)

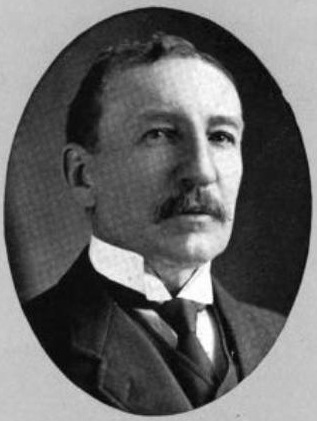

Member of the U.S. House of Representatives from New York's 23rd district
- In office March 4, 1911 – March 3, 1913
- Preceded by: George N. Southwick
- Succeeded by: Joseph A. Goulden

Mayor of Schenectady
- In office 1889–1891
- In office 1885–1887

Personal details
- Born: Henry Schermerhorn De Forest; February 16, 1847 Schenectady, New York
- Died: February 13, 1917 (aged 69) Schenectady, New York
- Party: Republican
- Spouse: Lucie E. Van Epps (m. 1876)
- Children: 2
- Education: Eastman Business College

Henry Schermerhorn De Forest (February 16, 1847 – February 13, 1917) was a U.S. representative from New York.

== Early life ==
Henry Schermerhorn DeForest was born in Schenectady, New York, on February 16, 1847. He was the third son of Sarah (née Vedder) De Forest and Obadiah Lansing De Forest, who was first elected deputy sheriff on the Know Nothing ticket, and then three terms as the Democratic sheriff of Schenectady in 1855.

His paternal grandparents were Jacob De Forest and Anna (née Lansing) De Forest.

He attended the Union Classical Institute in Schenectady and graduated in 1864 from Poughkeepsie's Eastman Business College.

== Career ==
DeForest was a farmer, and specialized in the production of broom corn. He was also successful businessman, with interests including real estate, which made him the city's largest landlord. He was also a building contractor, with his company constructing more than 1,000 homes in the Schenectady area. In addition, he was active in banking as a board of directors member for the Citizens' Trust Companies. After the advent of the automobile, DeForest owned a Pierce dealership in Schenectady.

He served as Schenectady's City Recorder from 1883 to 1885. He served as Mayor from 1885 to 1887 and 1889 to 1891. As Mayor he successfully advocated for General Electric to locate in Schenectady when it was formed from the mergers of several other companies, including Edison Machine Works, which had moved to Schenectady in 1886. As a result of his efforts, the expanded GE located in Schenectady in 1892.

DeForest was elected as a Republican to the Sixty-second Congress (March 4, 1911, to March 3, 1913). He was an unsuccessful candidate for reelection in 1912 to the Sixty-third Congress.

He was an unsuccessful candidate for nomination in 1914 to the Sixty-fourth Congress and for election in 1916 to the Sixty-fifth Congress.

== Personal life ==
On September 6, 1876, DeForest married Lucie E. Van Epps (1849–1930), the daughter of Harmonus Van Epps. Together, they were the parents of two daughters:

- Beulah DeForest, who married William Howard Wright.
- Pearl DeForest, who married George Kellogg Morris.

DeForest died in Schenectady on February 13, 1917, and was interred in Vale Cemetery in Schenectady. His widow died on September 5, 1930.

U.S. House of Representatives
Preceded by George N. Southwick	Member of the U.S. House of Representatives from New York's 23rd congressional district March 4, 1911 – March 3, 1913	Succeeded by Joseph A. Goulden
