= Jacob LeFever =

American politician

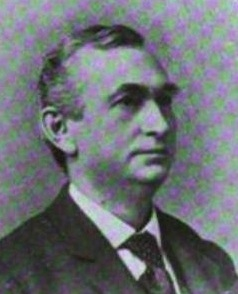
LeFever in 1896

Jacob LeFever (April 20, 1830 – February 4, 1905) was an American politician who was a U.S. representative from New York from 1893 to 1897.

== Biography ==
Jacob LeFever was born in New Paltz, New York on April 20, 1830. He was educated at New Paltz Academy and Amenia Seminary. He operated a successful farm and became a prominent businessman and banker. He was an officer of the Huguenot National Bank, a member of the board of directors of the New Paltz Savings Bank, and a member of the board of directors of the Wallkill Valley Railroad.

A Republican, LeFever served as Town Supervisor of New Paltz in 1861 and 1862, which also made him a member of the Ulster County Board of Supervisors.

He was a member of the New York State Assembly (Ulster Co., 2nd D.) in 1863, 1864, 1865 and 1867.

LeFever was a delegate to numerous Republican state conventions and was a delegate to the 1888 Republican National Convention.

LeFever was elected as a to the Fifty-third and Fifty-fourth Congresses (March 4, 1893 – March 3, 1897). He was not a candidate for renomination in 1896 to the Fifty-fifth Congress.

He served as president of the Huguenot National Bank from 1875 until his death. He died in New Paltz on February 4, 1905, and was interred in New Paltz Rural Cemetery.

Jacob LeFever was the father of Frank Jacob Le Fevre, who also served in Congress.

Although he usually spelled his name as "LeFever", it appears variously in contemporary records and news accounts as "Le Fever", "Le Fevre", and "LeFevre."

New York State Assembly
Preceded by George T. Pierce	New York State Assembly; Ulster County, 2nd District; 1863–1865	Succeeded by James G. Graham
New York State Assembly
Preceded by James G. Graham	New York State Assembly; Ulster County, 2nd District; 1867	Succeeded by Abraham E. Hasbrouck
U.S. House of Representatives
Preceded by John A. Quackenbush	Member of the U.S. House of Representatives from New York's 18th congressional district 1893–1897	Succeeded by John H. Ketcham
