= Joseph A. Goulden =

American politician (1844–1915)

Joseph Aloysius Goulden
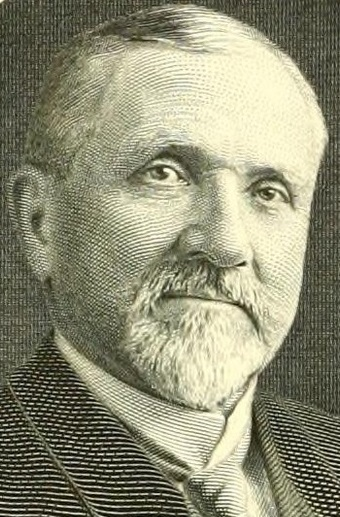
- Frontispiece of 1917's Joseph A. Goulden, Late a Representative

Member of the U.S. House of Representatives from New York
- In office March 4, 1913 – May 3, 1915
- Preceded by: Henry S. De Forest
- Succeeded by: William Stiles Bennet
- Constituency: 23rd district
- In office March 4, 1903 – March 3, 1911
- Preceded by: John H. Ketcham
- Succeeded by: Stephen B. Ayres
- Constituency: 18th district

Personal details
- Born: August 1, 1844 Littlestown, Pennsylvania, U.S.
- Died: May 3, 1915 (aged 70) Broad Street Station, Philadelphia, Pennsylvania, U.S.
- Resting place: St. Joseph's Cemetery, Taneytown, Maryland, U.S.
- Party: Democratic

Military service
- Allegiance: United States
- Branch/service: United States Marine Corps; Pennsylvania National Guard
- Years of service: 1864–1866 (Marine Corps); 1882-1886 (National Guard)
- Rank: Sergeant (Marine Corps); Colonel (National Guard)
- Unit: Marine Detachment, USS Don (Marine Corps); Military Staff, Governor Robert E. Pattison (National Guard)
- Battles/wars: American Civil War: Drewry's Bluff

Joseph Aloysius Goulden (August 1, 1844 – May 3, 1915) was an American educator, businessman, Civil War veteran, and politician who served five terms as a U.S. representative from New York from 1903 to 1911, and from 1913 to 1915.

== Biography ==
Born on August 1, 1844, in Littlestown, Pennsylvania, he attended the schools of Gettysburg, Pennsylvania and Taneytown, Maryland, graduated from Eagleton Institute in Taneytown, and received his certification as a teacher when he was 18. Goulden was present when Abraham Lincoln delivered the Gettysburg Address, and heard the speech in person.

=== Civil War ===
Goulden served during the American Civil War as a member of the United States Marine Corps. He enlisted in 1864, was discharged in 1866, and attained the rank of sergeant. He was a member of the Marine detachment aboard the USS Don, and saw combat in battles including Drewry's Bluff, where the ship he was on received fire from the shore and he was wounded.

=== Business career ===
After the war Goulden was a teacher and principal at public and parochial schools in Emmitsburg, Maryland and Martinsburg, West Virginia, and served as a member of the board of managers of Pennsylvania's state reformatory in Morganza, Pennsylvania. In 1870 he relocated to Pittsburgh, Pennsylvania, where he established himself in the insurance business as a manager for Penn Mutual Life Insurance. From 1882 to 1886 he served on the military staff of Governor Robert E. Pattison with the rank of colonel.

In 1889 Goulden moved to New York City, where he pursued business investments in addition to remaining active in insurance. Among his ventures was the Chelan Consolidated Copper Company, of which he was president. He was also the principal of an insurance agency, J. A. Goulden & Son.

Goulden later moved to The Bronx. He was active in several veterans' and civic causes, including the Atlantic Deeper Waterways Association, the state and city school systems, and the College of the City of New York. He was a member of the Grand Army of the Republic, a member of the board of trustees of the Bath, New York soldiers' home, and secretary of the commission that erected the Soldiers' and Sailors' Monument on Riverside Drive. Goulden Avenue in the Bronx is named in his honor.

Goulden spent summers and holidays at Glenburn, a country home in Taneytown which had been in his family for several generations.

== Political career ==
Goulden was active politics as a Democrat and was identified with Tammany Hall. In 1902 he was elected to the 58th Congress. He was reelected to the three succeeding Congresses and served from March 4, 1903, to March 3, 1911. He declined to be a candidate for reelection in 1910.

In 1912 Goulden was elected to the 63rd Congress. He was reelected to the 64th Congress in 1914, and served from March 4, 1913, until his death.

== Death and burial ==
He died in Philadelphia, Pennsylvania on May 3, 1915, expiring at Broad Street Station while in town to attend a meeting of the Penn Mutual Insurance Board of Trustees, of which he was a member. He was interred in St. Joseph's Cemetery in Taneytown.

== See also ==
- List of members of the United States Congress who died in office (1900–1949)

== External resources ==
- United States Congress. "Joseph A. Goulden (id: G000344)". Biographical Directory of the United States Congress.
- Joseph A. Goulden at Find a Grave
- Joseph A. Goulden, Late a Representative from New York. US Government Printing Office (Washington, DC). 1917.

U.S. House of Representatives
Preceded by John H. Ketcham	Member of the U.S. House of Representatives from New York's 18th congressional district 1903–1911	Succeeded by Stephen B. Ayres
Preceded by Henry S. De Forest	Member of the U.S. House of Representatives from New York's 23rd congressional district 1913–1915	Succeeded by William S. Bennet
