= George B. Francis =

American politician (1883–1967)

Member of the U.S. House of Representatives from New York's 18th district
- In office March 4, 1917 – March 3, 1919
- Preceded by: Thomas G. Patten
- Succeeded by: John F. Carew

Personal details
- Born: George Blinn Francis; August 12, 1883 Cranston, Rhode Island, U.S.
- Died: May 20, 1967 (aged 83) Boca Raton, Florida, U.S.
- Resting place: Green-Wood Cemetery, New York City, U.S.
- Party: Republican
- Education: Brown University; Harvard Law School
- Profession: Politician, lawyer

George Blinn Francis (August 12, 1883 – May 20, 1967) was a U.S. representative from New York.

== Biography ==
Born in Cranston, Rhode Island, Francis attended the University School in Providence, Rhode Island. He graduated from Brown University, Providence, Rhode Island, in 1904 and from Harvard Law School in 1907. He was admitted to the bar in 1907 and commenced practice in New York City.

Francis was elected as a Republican to the Sixty-fifth Congress (March 4, 1917 – March 3, 1919). He was not a candidate for renomination in 1918. He resumed the practice of law in New York City. He was special assistant United States attorney in Minnesota in 1926 and 1927.

Francis was elected a member of the board of water commissioners of Tarrytown, New York, and served as its president. He retired in October 1953 and resided at Delray Beach, Florida. He died May 20, 1967, in Boca Raton, Florida. He was interred in Green-Wood Cemetery, Brooklyn, New York.

U.S. House of Representatives
| Preceded by Thomas G. Patten | Member of the U.S. House of Representatives from New York's 18th congressional district 1917–1919 | Succeeded by John F. Carew |
