= Louis W. Emerson =

American politician (1857–1924)

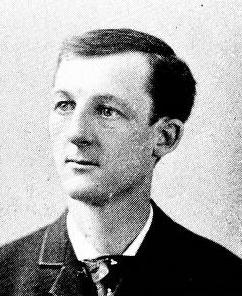
- Emerson in 1893

Member of the U.S. House of Representatives from New York's 23rd district
- In office March 4, 1899 – March 3, 1903
- Preceded by: Wallace T. Foote Jr.
- Succeeded by: George N. Southwick

Member of the New York State Senate from the 19th district
- In office January 1, 1890 – December 31, 1893
- Preceded by: Rowland C. Kellogg
- Succeeded by: Amasa J. Parker Jr.

Personal details
- Born: Louis Woodard Emerson; July 25, 1857 Warrensburg, New York, U.S.
- Died: June 10, 1924 (aged 66) Warrensburg, New York, U.S.
- Resting place: City Cemetery
- Party: Republican
- Relatives: James A. Emerson (brother)
- Profession: Politician

Louis Woodard Emerson (July 25, 1857 – June 10, 1924) was a U.S. representative from New York.

== Life ==
Born in Warrensburg, New York, Emerson attended the district schools and was graduated from Warrensburg Academy. He engaged in the lumber, banking, and manufacturing business.

Emerson was a delegate to the 1888, 1892 and 1896 Republican National Conventions.

Emerson was a member of the New York State Senate (19th D.) from 1890 to 1893, sitting in the 113th, 114th, 115th and 116th New York State Legislatures.

Emerson was elected as a Republican to the 56th and 57th United States Congresses, holding office from March 4, 1899, to March 3, 1903.

Emerson resumed former business activities in Warrensburg, New York, and died there June 10, 1924. He was interred in the City Cemetery.

State Senator James A. Emerson was his brother.

New York State Senate
Preceded by Rowland C. Kellogg	New York State Senate; 19th District; 1890–1893	Succeeded by Amasa J. Parker Jr.
U.S. House of Representatives
Preceded by Wallace T. Foote Jr.	Member of the U.S. House of Representatives from New York's 23rd congressional district 1899–1903	Succeeded by George N. Southwick
