= Edward W. Greenman =

American politician

Ed Greenman
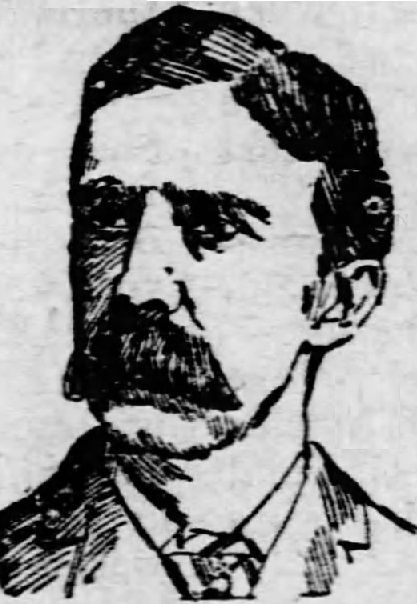
- Weekly Republican-Traveler (Arkansas City, KS), August 2, 1888

Member of the U.S. House of Representatives from New York's 18th district
- In office March 4, 1887 – March 3, 1889
- Preceded by: Henry G. Burleigh
- Succeeded by: John A. Quackenbush

Personal details
- Born: Edward Whitford Greenman; January 26, 1840 Berlin, New York, U.S.
- Died: August 3, 1908 (aged 68) Troy, New York, U.S.
- Resting place: Oakwood Cemetery; Troy, New York
- Party: Democratic
- Spouse: Mary E. Moore Greenman
- Profession: Banker; Politician

Edward Whitford Greenman (January 26, 1840 – August 3, 1908) was an American politician, banker, merchant, and manufacturer who served one term as a U.S. representative from New York from 1887 to 1889.

== Early life ==
Born in Berlin, New York, Greenman attended the common schools and De Ruyter Academy, Alfred, New York.

== Career ==
Greenman engaged in mercantile and manufacturing pursuits in Berlin and became town supervisor (1866–68). He was clerk of Rensselaer County (1868–71) and deputy county clerk for ten years. In 1874, he moved to Troy, New York.

=== Congress ===
Elected as a Democrat to the Fiftieth Congress, Greenman served as United States Representative for the eighteenth district of New York (March 4, 1887 – March 3, 1889). He was not a candidate for renomination in 1888.

=== Banking ===
Cashier of the Central National Bank of Troy, New York from 1888 to 1905, Greenman was also Cashier of the National City Bank of Troy from 1906 to 1908.

== Death ==
Greenman died in Troy, New York, on August 3, 1908 (age 68 years, 190 days). He is interred at Oakwood Cemetery.

== Family life ==
The son of Schuyler and Phebe Witford Greenman, he married Mary E. Moore on January 29, 1859.

U.S. House of Representatives
Preceded by Henry G. Burleigh	Member of the U.S. House of Representatives from New York's 18th congressional district 1887–1889	Succeeded by John A. Quackenbush
