= Clark B. Cochrane =

American politician

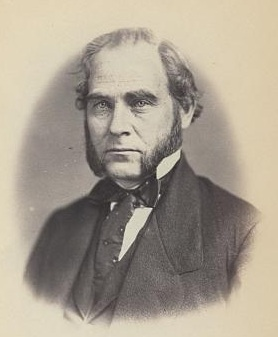

Member of the New York State Assembly (Albany Co., 3rd D.)
- In office 1866

Member of the U.S. House of Representatives from New York's 18th district
- In office March 4, 1857 – March 3, 1861
- Preceded by: Thomas R. Horton
- Succeeded by: Chauncey Vibbard

Member of the New York State Assembly (Montgomery Co.)
- In office 1844

Personal details
- Born: May 31, 1815 New Boston, New Hampshire
- Died: March 5, 1867 (aged 51) Albany, New York
- Party: Republican
- Education: Union College

Clark Betton Cochrane (May 31, 1815 – March 5, 1867) was a U.S. representative from New York.

Born in New Boston, New Hampshire, Cochrane moved to Montgomery County, New York. He was graduated from Union College, Schenectady, New York, in 1841. He studied law. He was admitted to the bar in 1841 and practiced in Amsterdam 1841–1851, Schenectady 1851–1855, and Albany, New York, from 1855 until his death.

Cochrane was elected as a Republican a member of the New York State Assembly (Montgomery Co.) in 1844. Trustee of Union College 1853–1867.

Cochrane was elected as a Republican to the Thirty-fifth and Thirty-sixth Congresses (March 4, 1857 – March 3, 1861). He was not a candidate for renomination in 1860. He resumed the practice of law in Albany. He served as delegate to the Republican National Convention in 1864. He was again a member of the State Assembly (Albany Co., 3rd D.) in 1866. He died in Albany, New York, on March 5, 1867. He was interred in Green Hill Cemetery, Amsterdam, New York.

U.S. House of Representatives
Preceded by Thomas R. Horton	Member of the U.S. House of Representatives from New York's 18th congressional district 1857–1861	Succeeded by Chauncey Vibbard
