= John M. Wever =

American politician

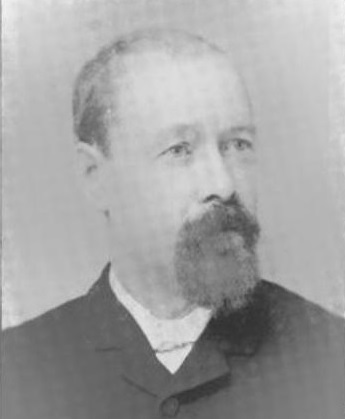

Member of the U.S. House of Representatives from New York
- In office March 4, 1891 – March 3, 1895
- Preceded by: John H. Moffitt
- Succeeded by: Wallace T. Foote, Jr.
- Constituency: 21st district (1891–1893); 23rd district (1893–1895)

Personal details
- Born: February 24, 1847 Ganges Township, Michigan
- Died: September 27, 1914 (aged 67) Plattsburgh, New York
- Party: Republican
- Profession: Banker

John Madison Wever (February 24, 1847 – September 27, 1914) was a U.S. representative from New York.

== Biography ==
Wever was born in Ganges Township, Michigan. He attended the common schools and Albion College. During the Civil War he entered the Union Army at the age of sixteen and served in the Army of the Cumberland and the Army of the Ohio. At the close of the war, he settled in Plattsburgh, New York, and engaged in banking. He was elected the county treasurer of Clinton County in 1884 and reelected in 1887.

Wever was elected as a Republican to the Fifty-second and Fifty-third Congresses, serving from March 4, 1891, to March 3, 1895. He was not a candidate for renomination in 1894 to the Fifty-fourth Congress.

He was cashier and later president of the Merchants’ National Bank of Plattsburgh. He died in Plattsburgh and is buried there in Riverside Cemetery.

U.S. House of Representatives
Preceded by John H. Moffitt	Member of the U.S. House of Representatives from New York's 21st congressional district 1891–1893	Succeeded by Simon J. Schermerhorn
Preceded by Henry W. Bentley	Member of the U.S. House of Representatives from New York's 23rd congressional district 1893–1895	Succeeded by Wallace T. Foote, Jr.
