= Wallace T. Foote Jr. =

American politician

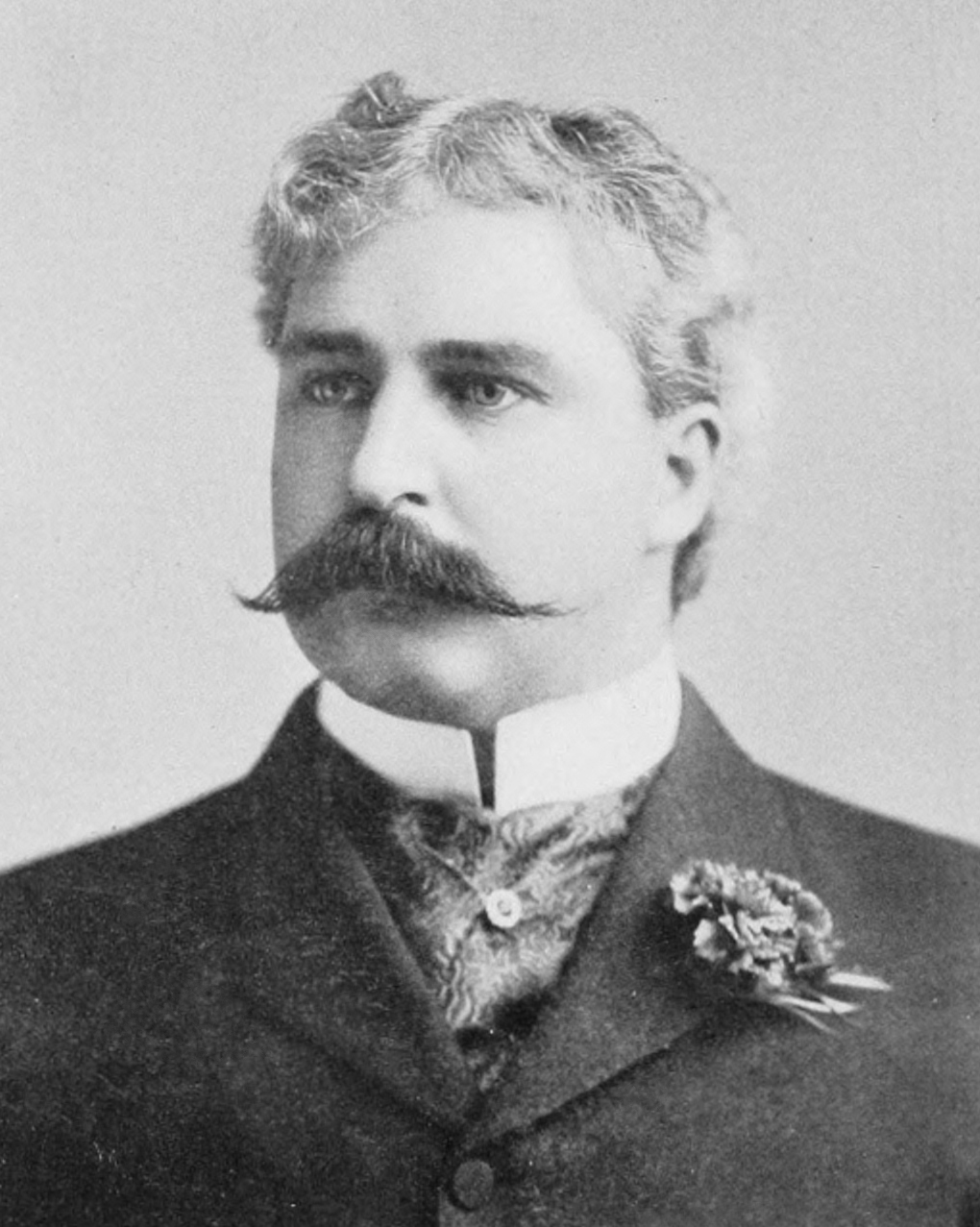
- Foote, 1899

Member of the U.S. House of Representatives from New York's 23rd district
- In office March 4, 1895 – March 3, 1899
- Preceded by: John M. Wever
- Succeeded by: Louis W. Emerson

Personal details
- Born: April 7, 1864 Port Henry, New York, USA
- Died: December 17, 1910 (aged 46) New York City, New York, USA
- Resting place: Union Cemetery, Port Henry, New York
- Party: Republican

Wallace Turner Foote Jr. (April 7, 1864 – December 17, 1910) was a U.S. Representative from New York.

Born in Port Henry, New York, Foote attended the Port Henry Union School and Williston Seminary, Easthampton, Massachusetts, and was graduated as a civil engineer from Union College, Schenectady, New York, in 1885. He served as assistant superintendent of the Cedar Point Furnace in Port Henry 1885–1887. He attended Columbia Law School, New York City. He was admitted to the bar in 1889 and commenced practice in Port Henry.

Foote was elected as a Republican to the Fifty-fourth and Fifty-fifth Congresses (March 4, 1895 – March 3, 1899). He was not a candidate for renomination in 1898. He resumed the practice of law and also engaged in mining. He died in New York City on December 17, 1910. He was interred in Union Cemetery, Port Henry, New York.

U.S. House of Representatives
Preceded by John M. Wever	Member of the U.S. House of Representatives from New York's 23rd congressional district 1895 – 1899	Succeeded by Louis W. Emerson
