= Frederick A. Johnson =

American politician

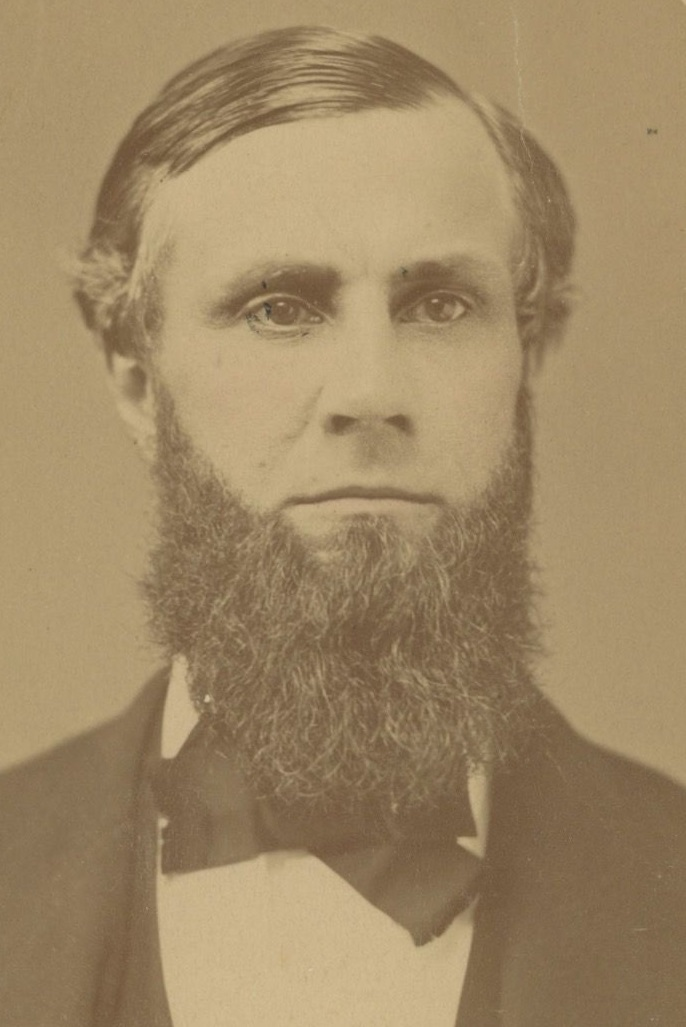
- 1870 photo

Member of the U.S. House of Representatives from New York
- In office March 4, 1883 – March 3, 1887
- Preceded by: John Hammond
- Succeeded by: John H. Moffitt
- Constituency: 18th district (1883–85); 21st district (1885–87)

Personal details
- Born: January 2, 1833 Fort Edward, New York, U.S.
- Died: July 17, 1893 (aged 60) Glens Falls, New York, U.S.
- Party: Republican
- Spouse: Harriet Elizabeth Locke Johnson
- Children: Albert Cheney Johnson
- Profession: banker; politician

Frederick Avery Johnson (January 2, 1833 – July 17, 1893) was an American politician and banker who served a U.S. Representative from New York from 1883 to 1887. He was a member of the Republican Party and a resident of Glens Falls, New York.

== Biography ==
Born in Fort Edward, New York, Johnson attended the common schools and graduated from Glens Falls Academy in nearby Glens Falls, New York. He married Harriet Elizabeth Locke on September 1, 1858.

== Career ==
Johnson engaged in banking and in the wool business in New York City and later in banking in Glens Falls. He served as president of the village of Glens Falls.

Elected as a Republican to the 48th United States Congress representing New York's eighteenth district, Johnson served from March 4, 1883, to March 3, 1885. He was then elected to the 49th United States Congress representing New York's twenty-first district from March 4, 1885, to March 3, 1887. He was not a candidate for renomination in 1886.

== Death ==
Johnson died at Glens Falls, Warren County, New York on July 17, 1893. He is interred at Glens Falls Cemetery (also known as Bay Street Cemetery), Glens Falls, New York.

U.S. House of Representatives
Preceded by John Hammond	Member of the U.S. House of Representatives from New York's 18th congressional district 1883–1885	Succeeded by Henry G. Burleigh
Preceded by George W. Ray	Member of the U.S. House of Representatives from New York's 21st congressional district 1885–1887	Succeeded by John H. Moffitt
