= John A. Quackenbush =

American politician

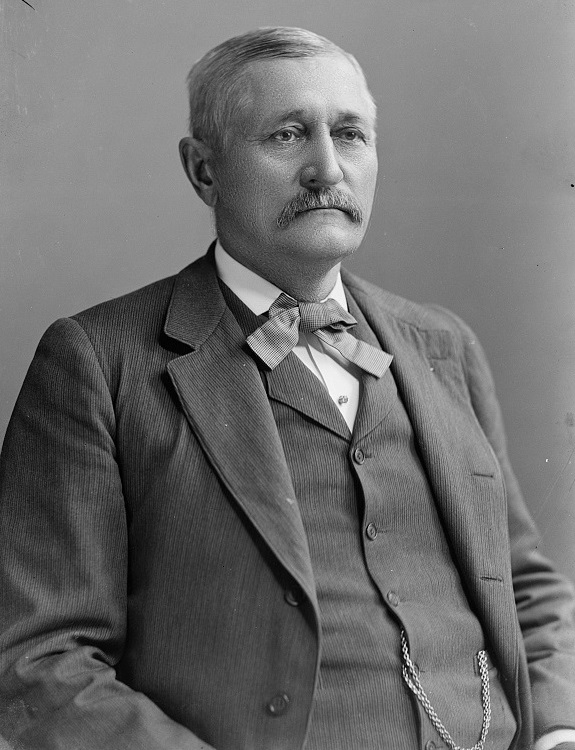
C. M. Bell Studio Collection, Library of Congress

John Adam Quackenbush (October 15, 1828 – May 11, 1908) was a U.S. Republican politician from New York.

== Biography ==
John A. Quackenbush was born in Schaghticoke, New York on October 15, 1828. He was educated locally, graduated from Stillwater Academy and became a farmer, also becoming active in other ventures including a lumber business.

A Republican, he was Schaghticoke's Town Supervisor from 1860 to 1862, also serving as Chairman of the Rensselaer County Board of Supervisors. Quackenbush was a member of the New York State Assembly (Rensselaer Co., 2nd D.) in 1863. From 1873 to 1876 Quackenbush was Sheriff of Rensselaer County.

Quackenbush was elected as a United States representative in 1888 and again in 1890, serving from March 4, 1889, to March 3, 1893. He was an unsuccessful candidate for reelection in 1892, afterwards living in retirement in Schaghticoke.

He died in Schaghticoke on May 11, 1908, and was buried in Schaghticoke's Elmwood Cemetery.

== Sources ==
- United States Congress. "John A. Quackenbush (id: Q000001)". Biographical Directory of the United States Congress.
- Hudson Valley Times, Obituary, John A. Quackenbush, May 13, 1908

New York State Assembly
Preceded by David G. Maxon	New York State Assembly; Rensselaer County, 2nd District; 1863	Succeeded by George W. Banker
U.S. House of Representatives
Preceded by Edward W. Greenman	Member of the U.S. House of Representatives from New York's 18th congressional district 1889–1893	Succeeded by Jacob LeFever
