= Glen Ridge Motorsports Park =

Motorsport venue in Fultonville, New York

The Ridge
- Location: Fultonville, New York
- Coordinates: 42.8192°N 75.31036°W
- Owner: James and Jeffrey Hayes
- Operator: Ray Sefrin and Butch Hazzard
- Opened: 2004
- Website: www.glenridgemp.com

Oval
- Surface: Dirt
- Length: .4 km (0.25 mi)
- Turns: 4

Glen Ridge Motorsports Park is a quarter-mile dirt oval raceway located in the Capital Region of New York State.

== Overview ==
The Glen Ridge Motorsports Park was originally constructed by brothers James and Jeffrey Hayes as a go-kart track in 2004, but it was soon reworked to accommodate full sized racing cars. The Hayes engaged a series of promoters over the first three seasons, eventually reaching an agreement with veteran driver Andy Romano and Hall of Fame car owner Jake Spraker in 2007.

In 2014 Mike Sowle and Pete Demetraszek, took over operations, then turned the reins over to current promoters Butch Hazzard, Ray Sefrin, and Mike Parillo in 2017.

== Events ==
The Glen Ridge Motorsports Park offers auto racing every Sunday from May through October. The track features the DIRTcar sanctioned Modifieds, Sportsman and Limited Sportsman, Pro Stocks, Street Stocks, and Mini-stocks.
