= Fultonville, New York =

- Village
- Location within New York Location within the United States
- Coordinates: 42°56′48″N 74°22′10″W
- Country: United States
- State: New York
- County: Montgomery
- Town: Glen

Government
  - Mayor: Tim Morford

Area
  - Total: 0.52 sq mi (1.35 km^{2})
  - Land: 0.48 sq mi (1.24 km^{2})
  - Water: 0.042 sq mi (0.11 km^{2})
- Elevation: 289 ft (88 m)

Population (2020)
  - Total: 742
  - Density: 1,555.4/sq mi (600.55/km^{2})
- Time zone: UTC-5 (Eastern (EST))
  - Summer (DST): UTC-4 (EDT)
- ZIP Code: 12072
- Area code: 518
- FIPS code: 36-27859
- GNIS feature ID: 0950807
- Website: fultonville.org

- Fultonville Historic District
- U.S. National Register of Historic Places
- U.S. Historic district
- NRHP reference No.: 100004242
- Designated HD: August 8, 2019

Fultonville is a village in Montgomery County, New York, United States. The village is named after Robert Fulton, inventor of the steamboat. As of the 2020 census, the village had a population of 742.

Fultonville is on the south bank of the Mohawk River in the town of Glen. It is west of the city of Amsterdam.

In 2019, the area of the village that had been developed in the 19th and early 20th centuries was listed on the National Register of Historic Places as the Fultonville Historic District, in recognition of its well-preserved architecture from its original settlement, the era centering around the development of the Erie Canal and afterwards.

== History ==
The present village is located near the site of the Mohawk village of Andagaron, which was active during the middle of the seventeenth century and located about a mile to the west.

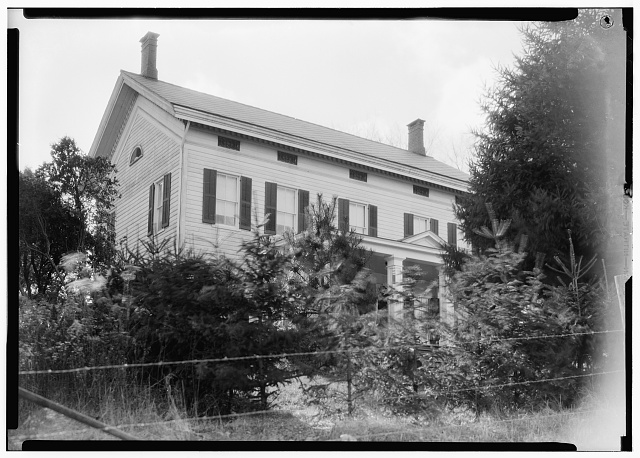
John Evart Van Epps house, Fultonville, NY, c.1936, front view. This building built c.1800

The first white settlement on the site was made around 1750 by John Evart Van Epps and was called "Van Epps Swamp" due to the swampland by the river. During the American Revolution, the homes that were located here were burned.

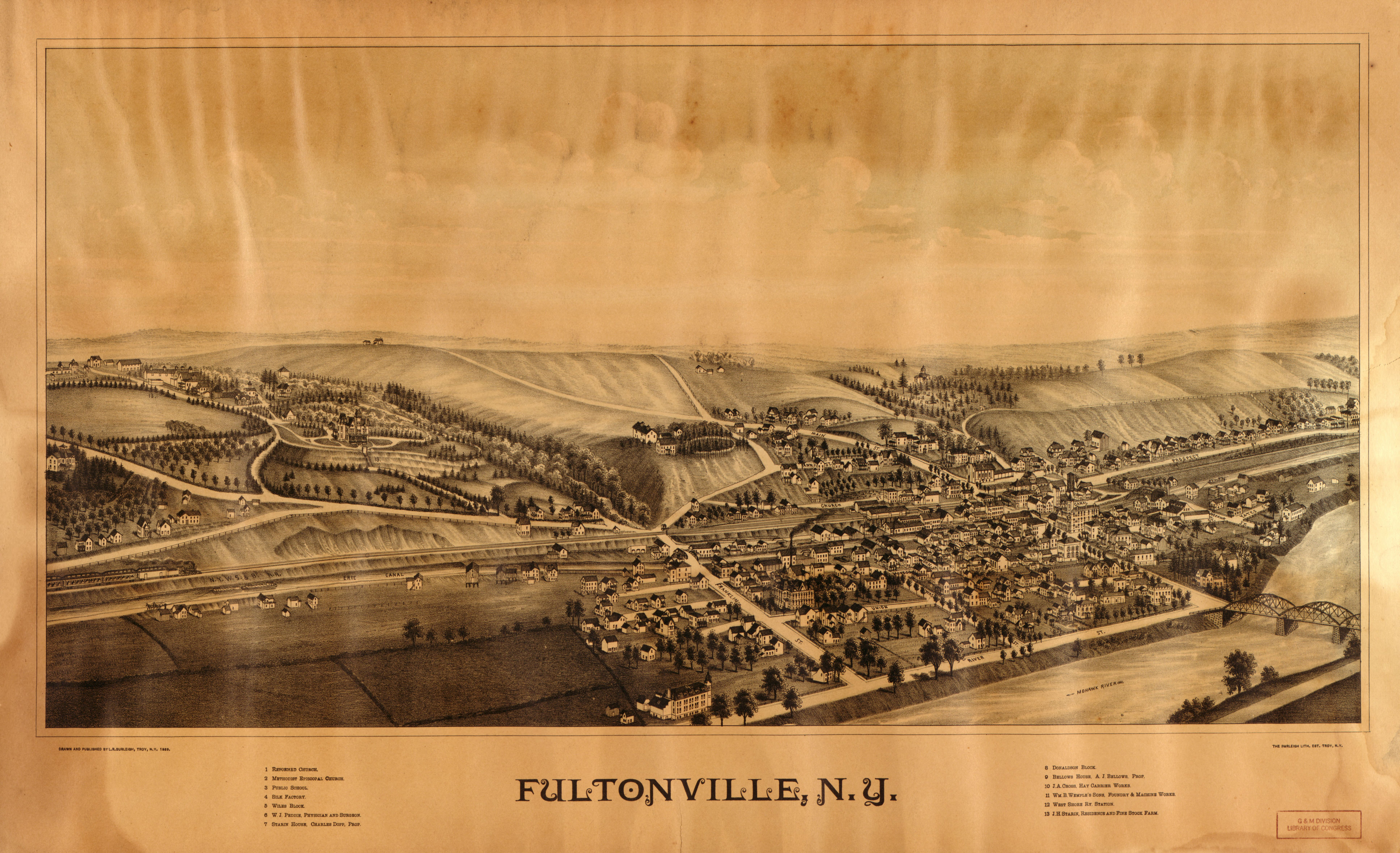
Lithograph of Fultonville from 1889 by L.R. Burleigh including list of landmarks

Fultonville was founded around 1824 in anticipation of the opening of the Erie Canal and was incorporated as a village on August 9, 1848.

The West Shore Railroad, which was later absorbed into the New York Central system, erected a station in the village in 1889.

John Henry Starin was born in August 1825 in Sammonsville on the north side of the Mohawk, when the Erie Canal was in its infancy. His father, Myndert, had a tavern along the river, and his grandfather, John, was a farmer who had served in the military during the American Revolution. The family was successful and had some money, but Starin would become one of the richest men in America as president of the Starin City River & Harbor Transportation Co. and as director of the North River Bank in New York City and the Fultonville National Bank.

=== Original trustees ===
- Howland Fish - President
- Andrew J Yates
- William B Wemple
- Thomas R Horton
- Delancey D Starin

=== Mayors ===
- Howland Fish [Dem] [1848-1849]
- Cornelius Gardinier [Whig] [1850-1851]
- H.P. Voorhees [1852-1854]
- Jeptha Root Simms [1855-1856]
- Frothingham Fish [Rep] [1856-1857]
- William E. Eacker [1858-1859]
- T.R. Horton [1859-1860]
- Warren I Ingham [1860-1861]
- Joseph M Yates [1861-1862]
- John H. Starin [Rep] [1862-1863]
- J.A.O South Union Party [1863-1864]
- William B Wemple [1864-1865] (1st Term)
- John W Wilson [1865-1866] (1st Term)
- John H. Gardiner [1867-1868]
- William B Wemple [1868-1869] (2nd Term)
- John W Wilson [1869-1870] (2nd Term)
- H.B. Freeman [1870-1871] (1st Term)
- William B Chapman [1871-1872]
- Edward Wemple [Democrat] [1873-1874]
- J.R. Putman [1874-1875]
- William E Eacker [1875-1876] (1st Term)
- Everrett A Yates [1876-1877]
- Charles H Quackenbush [1877-1878]
- John W Wilson [1878-1879] (3rd Term)
- H.B. Freeman [1879-1880] (2nd Term)
- William R Chapman [1880-1881]
- Charles A Donaldson [1881-1882] (1st Term)
- Michael Reapdon [1882-1883]
- William E Eacker [1883-1884] (2nd Term)
- Charles A Donaldson [1884-1885] (2nd Term)
- William Cross [1885-1886]
- Nicholas V Peek [1886-1887]
- Lorenzo V Peek [1887-1888]
- Charles A Donaldson [1888-1890] (3rd Term)
- Robert Wemple [Dem] [1890-1893]
- William P Myers [1893-1895]
- William J Peddle [1895-1897]
- Robert B Fish [1897-1899]
- Charles Richard [1899-1903]
- H. Seymour Wemple [1903-1906]
- Phillip Abel [1906-1907]
- Robert Wemple Sr. [1907-1908]
- William Van Epps [1908-1909] (1st Term)
- Rufus Rchtmyer [Republican] [1909-1910]
- Richard Brace [Democrat] [1910-1911] (1st Term)
- Henry Johnson [1911-1912]
- Robert T Craig [1912-1913]
- Edward J Gilbert [1913-1917] (1st Term)
- William Van Epps [1917-1918] (2nd Term)
- Christian P Wemple [1918-1919]
- A.L. Van Horne [1919-1920]
- Edward J Gilbert [1920-1921] (2nd Term)
- Richard Brace [1921-1922] [Democrat] (2nd Term)
- OR J Brand [1922-1923]
- A.J. Wemple [1923-1924]
- Edward J Gilbert [1924-1928] (3rd Term)
- L.N. Vedder [1928-1933]
- William B Foody [1933-1937]
- Peter Rossi [1937-1951]
- George Synder [Republican] [1951-1957]
- Henry Lorentzen [Democrat] [1957-1959]
- Raymond Carpenter [1959- Jan 1960] (Resigned)
- Raymond Siviek [Jan 1960 - March 1960] (Acting)
- Edward S Yates [Independent Democrat] [March 1960 - June 1987]
- George Wadsworth [Pine Tree Party] [June 1987 - March 1991]
- Gary Gifford Sr. [Independent] [March 1991 - April 1995]
- Daniel Szabo [Independent Democrat] [April 1995 - Sept 2000] (Resigned)
- Robert Headwell [Republican] [Sept 2000 - 2016] (Resigned to run for County Legislator)
- George Donaldson [Republican] [2016- March 2017] (Acting)
- Ryan B Weitz [Fultonville Future] [March 2017 - May 2017] (Resigned after one month)
- Linda Petterson-Law [Community] [Appointed May 2017 to March 31, 2018, elected March 2018 for term April 1, 2018, to March 31, 2019, elected March 2019, term April 1, 2019, to March 31, 2023
- Timothy Morford [Fultonville Future] [April 2023–present]

== Attractions ==
=== Cobblestone Hall and Free Library ===
Cobblestone Hall and Free Library

Cobblestone Hall and Free Library was built sometime before 1868 when the house belonged to C. B. Freeman. Freeman was the proprietor of Fultonville Steam Mills. He lived at this residence until at least 1878 when F. W. Beers published a history of Montgomery and Fulton counties. By 1905, a large wooden addition had been made to the rear of the building which was then called "Cobblestone Free Hall and Library". Most of the building still stands aside from the addition, and has since been converted into a private residence.

=== Other attractions ===
Starin Mausoleum in Fultonville Cemetery

- Fultonville Cemetery– original burying ground for the Protestant Dutch Church of Fultonville
- Glen Ridge Motorsports Park– auto racing facility

== Geography ==
Fultonville is located in northern Montgomery County at 42°56′48″N 74°22′10″W (42.946764, -74.369395), along the northern edge of the town of Glen. It is on the south bank of the Mohawk River with the village of Fonda on the opposite shore, linked by a bridge carrying NY-30A. The Mohawk River is part of the Erie Canal at this location.

According to the U.S. Census Bureau, the village of Fultonville covers a total area of 0.52 square miles (1.35 km^{2}), of which 0.48 square miles (1.24 km^{2}) are land and 0.04 square miles (0.10 km^{2}), or 8.27%, are water.

The New York State Thruway (Interstate 90) passes through the community, with access from Exit 28. The Thruway leads southeast 40 miles (64 km) to Albany and west 50 miles (80 km) to Utica. New York State Route 5S (Maple Avenue) parallels the Thruway and intersects New York State Route 30A (Main Street) in Fultonville. NY-5S leads east 10 miles (16 km) to Amsterdam and west 12 miles (19 km) to Canajoharie, while NY-30A leads north across the river into Fonda and then 5 miles (8 km) to Johnstown, and south 14 miles (23 km) to Sloansville.

== Climate ==
The climate is hemiboreal. The average temperature is 45.7 °F (7.6 °C). The warmest month is July, at 79.5 °F (26.4 °C), and the coldest is January, at 26.6 °F (−3.0 °C). The average rainfall is 33.75 inches (857 mm) per year. The wettest month is May, with 3.46 inches (88 mm) of rain, and the driest month is September, with 2.13 inches (54 mm).

Fultonville

Climate chart (precipitation, max. and min. temperature)
J	F	M	A	M	J	J	A	S	O	N	D
2.6 27 15	2.7 30 17	2.5 39 24	3.3 53 35	3.5 66 46	3.2 73 52	2.5 80 58	2.6 77 57	2.1 71 51	3.2 56 42	2.4 44 31	3.1 33 23
- █ Average max. and min. temperatures in °F
- █ Precipitation totals in inches
Metric conversion
J	F	M	A	M	J	J	A	S	O	N	D
65 −3 −9	69 −1 −8	63 4 −4	83 11 2	88 19 8	81 23 11	64 26 15	67 25 14	54 21 10	82 14 5	62 6 0	79 0 −5
- █ Average max. and min. temperatures in °C
- █ Precipitation totals in mm

Climate data for Fultonville, New York
Month	Jan	Feb	Mar	Apr	May	Jun	Jul	Aug	Sep	Oct	Nov	Dec	Year
Average precipitation inches (mm)	2.56 (65)	2.72 (69)	2.48 (63)	3.27 (83)	3.46 (88)	3.19 (81)	2.52 (64)	2.64 (67)	2.13 (54)	3.23 (82)	2.44 (62)	3.11 (79)	33.75 (857)
Average snowfall inches (cm)	10.24 (26.0)	11.54 (29.3)	6.46 (16.4)	2.05 (5.2)	0.16 (0.41)	0.0 (0.0)	0.0 (0.0)	0.0 (0.0)	0.0 (0.0)	0.63 (1.6)	4.45 (11.3)	7.95 (20.2)	43.48 (110.4)
Average precipitation days (≥ 0.01 in)	9.8	8.9	14.8	16.3	17.2	15.9	16.7	15.3	12.0	14.1	12.3	12.2	165.5
Average snowy days (≥ 0.1 in)	17.5	16.6	12.3	4.2	0.4	0.0	0.0	0.0	0.0	0.7	7.2	13.8	72.7

Climate data for Fultonville, New York
Month	Jan	Feb	Mar	Apr	May	Jun	Jul	Aug	Sep	Oct	Nov	Dec	Year
Mean monthly sunshine hours	280.0	281.9	372.0	391.0	436.1	451.0	465.0	405.6	361.5	341.0	272.0	279.5	4,336.6
Mean daily daylight hours	9.4	8.4	10.7	10.4	11.8	11.8	11.3	12.3	15.5	13.7	13.3	10.2	11.6
Percentage possible sunshine	38	42	50	54	59	63	62	55	50	46	38	37	49
Average ultraviolet index	1	1	2	3	5	5	5	5	3	2	2	1	3

== Demographics ==
Historical population
Census	Pop.	Note	%±
1870	1,117		—
1880	881		−21.1%
1890	1,122		27.4%
1900	977		−12.9%
1910	812		−16.9%
1920	869		7.0%
1930	831		−4.4%
1940	806		−3.0%
1950	840		4.2%
1960	815		−3.0%
1970	812		−0.4%
1980	777		−4.3%
1990	748		−3.7%
2000	710		−5.1%
2010	784		10.4%
2020	742		−5.4%
U.S. Decennial Census

As of the census of 2000, 710 people, 279 households, and 191 families resided in the village. The population density was 1,590.0 inhabitants per square mile (613.9/km^{2}). The 309 housing units create an average density of 642.8 per square mile (248.2/km^{2}). The racial makeup of the village was 99.00% White, 1.00% Latino. A total of 99.52% spoke English, 0.36% spoke German and 0.12% spoke Polish.

33.0% of households had children under age 18 living with them. 44.4% were married couples living together. 17.6% had a female householder with no husband present. 31.2% were non-families. 25.8% of all households were made up of single individuals and 11.8% had someone living alone aged 65+. The average household size was 2.50 and the average family size was 2.96.

27.7% were under age 18, 9.4% from 18 to 24, 26.9% from 25 to 44, 21.4% from 45 to 64, and 14.5% who were 65+. The median age was 35. For every 100 females, the village hosted 87.3 males. For every 100 females age 18 and over, there were 88.6 males.

The median household income was $32,361, and the median family income was $34,167. Males had a median income of $30,500 versus $20,909 for females. The per capita income for the village was $15,283. About 3.4% of families and 6.9% of the population were below the poverty line, including 3.3% of those under age 18 and 4.5% of those age 65 or over.

== Education ==
Fultonville is within the Fonda-Fultonville Central School District.

== Religion ==
Reformed Church - 1907–1915

Methodist Church - 1907–1915

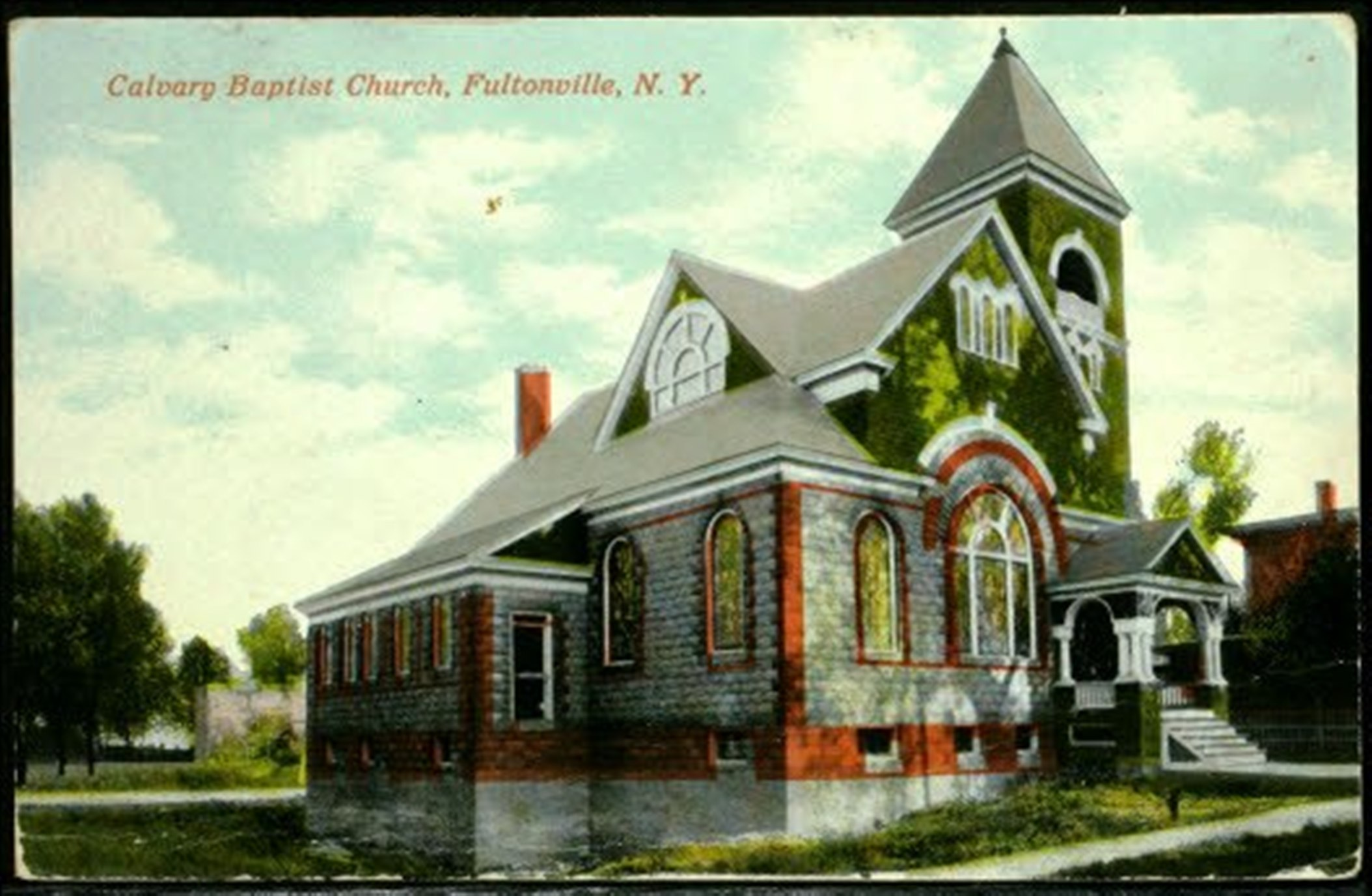
Calvary Baptist Church - 1907–1915
- Fultonville Reformed Church
- Fonda-Fultonville United Methodist Church (torn down after fire March 14, 2017)
- Calvary Baptist Church (no longer in use)

== Cemeteries ==
- Maple Avenue Cemetery - Est. 1874
- Old Fultonville Cemetery

== See also ==
- National Register of Historic Places listings in Montgomery County, New York
