= 1888 United States House of Representatives elections =

House elections for the 51st U.S. Congress

- June 6, September 4, September 10, and November 6, 1888 (Note: Regulars only, not including Specials.)

All 332 seats in the United States House of Representatives (Note: Includes the late elections of six new states that joined the union in 1889 and 1890.) 167 seats needed for a majority
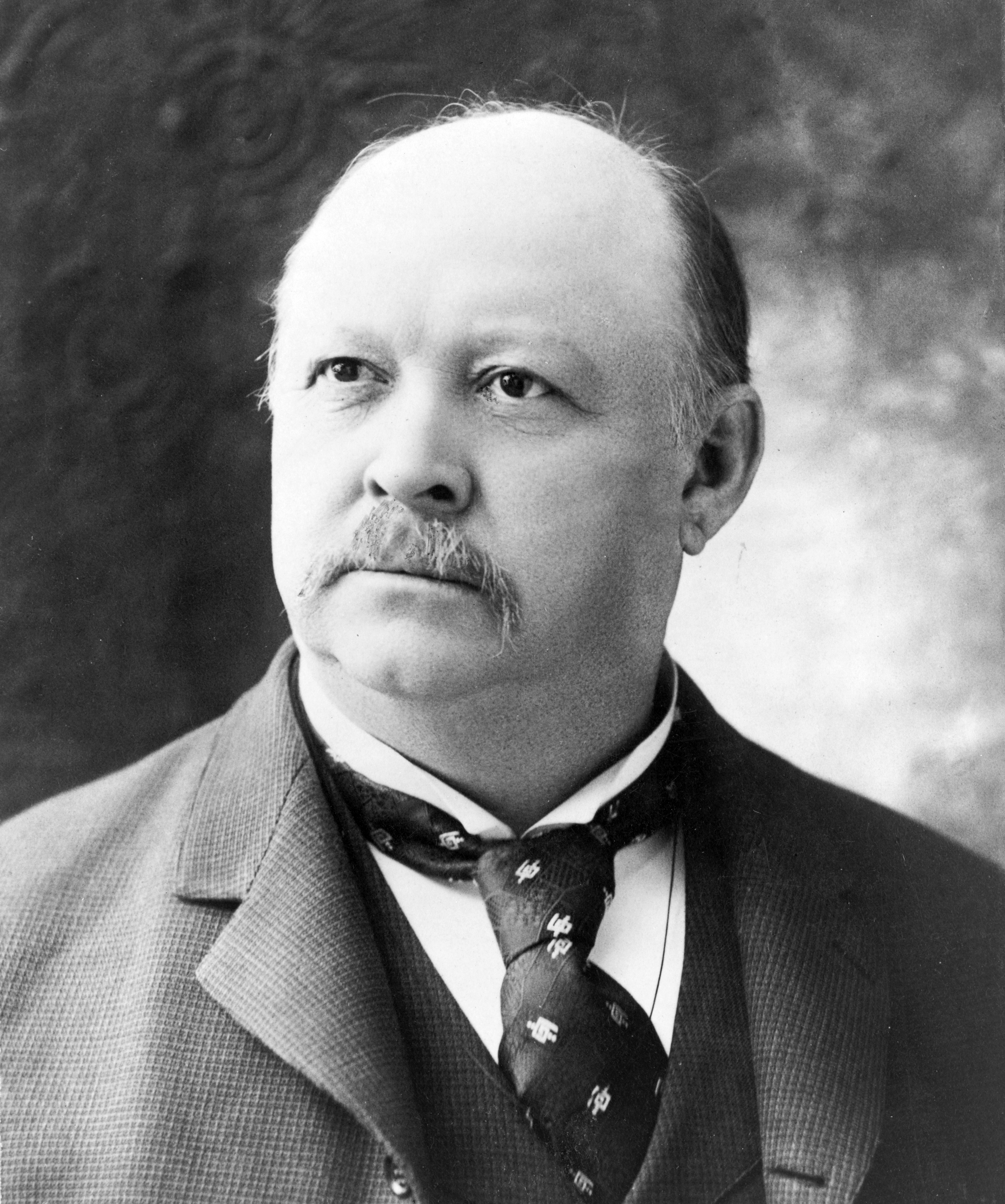

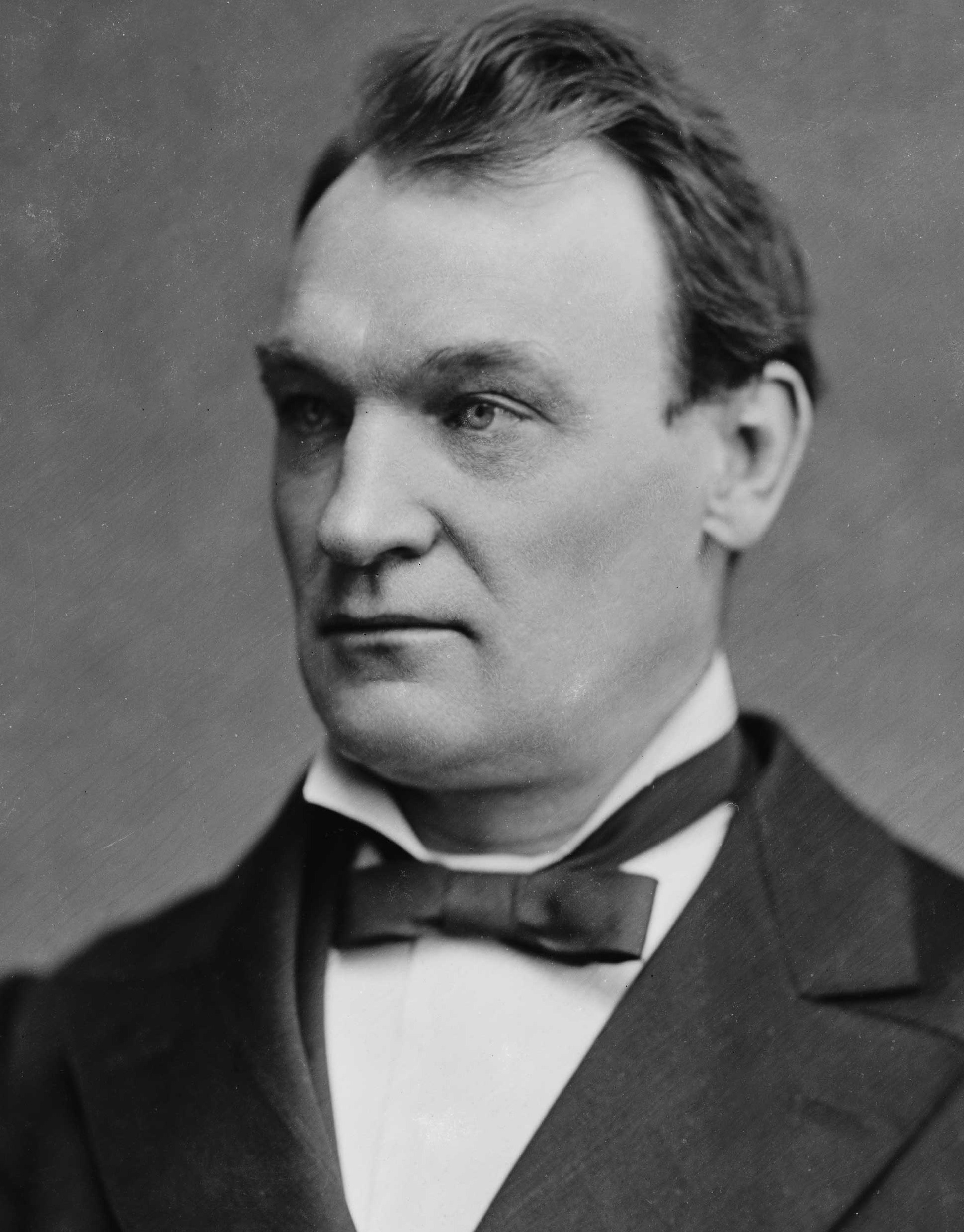
	Majority party	Minority party
Leader	Thomas Brackett Reed	John G. Carlisle
Party	Republican	Democratic
Leader's seat	Maine 1st	Kentucky 6th
Last election	152 seats	167 seats
Seats won	179 (Note: There are significant discrepancies between the party counts provided by Martis (pp. 142–43) and Dubin (p. 285) in regards to the 51st Congress, mainly due to the fact that Martis counts the results of many later contested elections (which were generally decided in favor of the challenging Republican candidate, resulting in the unseating of a number of Democratic members). Dubin records 169 Republicans and 161 Democrats on the first day of the 1st session of the 51st Congress; Dubin reports 177 Republicans, 154 Democrats, and one Labor Party member at the start of the 2nd session of the 51st Congress, figures that nearly match Martis' numbers.)	152
Seat change	▲27	▼15
Popular vote	5,408,259	5,558,964
Percentage	47.36%	48.68%
Swing	▲2.37pp	▲0.56pp
	Third party	Fourth party
Party	Labor	Independent
Last election	2 seats	2 seats (Note: Including 2 Independent Republicans, John Alexander Anderson elected to Kansas's 5th congressional district, and Albert R. Anderson to Iowa's 8th congressional district.)
Seats won	1	0
Seat change	▼1	▼2
Popular vote	161,225	61,520
Percentage	1.41%	0.54%
Swing	▲0.33pp	▼1.54pp
- Map of U.S. House elections results from 1888 elections for 51st Congress on election day (a number of Southern seats were later successfully contested and the results overturned)
Speaker before election
John Carlisle
Democratic
Elected Speaker
Thomas Reed
Republican

The 1888 United States House of Representatives elections were held for the most part on November 6, 1888, with three states holding theirs early between June and September. They occurred at the same time as the election of President Benjamin Harrison. Elections were initially held for 325 seats of the United States House of Representatives, representing 38 states, to serve in the 51st United States Congress. Six new states would later join the union and increase the House to 332 seats. Special elections were also held throughout the year.

Harrison's Republican Party gained a majority in the House at the expense of the Democratic Party, even though incumbent President Grover Cleveland actually received more votes counted than Harrison. However, as in other elections in the period, widespread vote suppression and electoral fraud was common on behalf of Democrats and against black Republicans in the Southern United States. The Republican House majority in uncontested elections unseated a number of initially reported as victorious Democratic candidates in favor of Republican candidates who contested their election loss.

The issue of tariffs played a key role in this election. The Democrats, with the support of farmers and laborers, wanted to lower tariffs in order to promote free trade, while the Republicans, backed by industry and big business, believed that higher tariffs were necessary to protect American manufacturing. Especially in industrializing regions, voters chose the Republican view on tariffs, as they gave the party a slim majority in the House.

Hamilton D. Coleman’s win in the Second District would prove the last time until 1972 that a Republican won any House seat in Louisiana, for the disenfrachisement of almost all blacks in the 1890s would leave that state completely devoid of Republican support until after the Dixiecrat bolt.

== Election summaries ==
Seven seats were added, for the six new states of, in order of admission (number of House seats for each new state listed in parentheses): North Dakota (1), South Dakota (2), Montana (1), Washington (1), Idaho (1), and Wyoming (1).

↓
179	1	152
Republican	(Note: There was 1 labor member.)	Democratic

State	Type	Total seats	Republican		Democratic		Others	
State	Type	Total seats	Seats	Change	Seats	Change	Seats	Change
Alabama	District	8	1	▲1	7	▼1	0	Steady
Arkansas	District	5	1	Steady	3	Steady	1 (Note: After a contested election, Lewis P. Featherstone of the Labor Party was declared the winner in Arkansas's 1st congressional district.)	▲1
California	District	6	4	Steady	2	Steady	0	Steady
Colorado	At-large	1	1	Steady	0	Steady	0	Steady
Connecticut	District	4	3	▲1	1	▼1	0	Steady
Delaware	At-large	1	0	Steady	1	Steady	0	Steady
Florida	District	2	0	Steady	2	Steady	0	Steady
Georgia	District	10	0	Steady	10	Steady	0	Steady
Illinois	District	20	13	▼1	7	▲1	0	Steady
Indiana	District	13	3	▼4	10	▲4	0	Steady
Iowa	District	11	10	▲1	1	Steady	0	▼1 (Note: Greenback Party)
Kansas	District	7	7	Steady	0	Steady	0	Steady
Kentucky	District	11	2	▼1	9	▲1	0	Steady
Louisiana	District	6	1	▲1	5	▼1	0	Steady
Maine (Note: Elections held early.)	District	4	4	Steady	0	Steady	0	Steady
Maryland	District	6	3	▲2	3	▼2	0	Steady
Massachusetts	District	12	10	▲2	2	▼2	0	Steady
Michigan	District	11	9	▲3	2	▼3	0	Steady
Minnesota	District	5	5	▲3	0	▼3	0	Steady
Mississippi	District	7	0	Steady	7	Steady	0	Steady
Missouri	District	14	4	▲2	10	▼2	0	Steady
Nebraska	District	3	3	▲1	0	▼1	0	Steady
Nevada	At-large	1	1	Steady	0	Steady	0	Steady
New Hampshire	District	2	2	▲1	0	▼1	0	Steady
New Jersey	District	7	4	▼1	3	▲1	0	Steady
New York	District	34	19	▲1	15	▼1	0	Steady
North Carolina	District	9	3	▲2	6	▼2	0	▼1 (Note: Independent)
Ohio	District	21	16	▲1	5	▼1	0	Steady
Oregon	At-large	1	1	Steady	0	Steady	0	Steady
Pennsylvania	District (Note: At-large seat eliminated in redistricting.)	28	21	▲1	7	▼1	0	Steady
Rhode Island	District	2	2	Steady	0	Steady	0	Steady
South Carolina	District	7	1	▲1	6	▼1	0	Steady
Tennessee	District	10	3	▲1	7	▼1	0	Steady
Texas	District	11	0	Steady	11	Steady	0	Steady
Vermont	District	2	2	Steady	0	Steady	0	Steady
Virginia	District	10	4	▼2	6	▲3	0	▼1 (Note: Labor Party)
West Virginia	District	4	2	▲1	2	▼1	0	Steady
Wisconsin	District	9	7	Steady	2	▲1	0	▼1
1889 elections (New States)
Montana	At-large	1	1	▲1	0	Steady	0	Steady
North Dakota	At-large	1	1	▲1	0	Steady	0	Steady
South Dakota	At-large	2	2	▲2	0	Steady	0	Steady
Washington	At-large	1	1	▲1	0	Steady	0	Steady
1890 elections (New States)
Idaho	At-large	1	1	▲1	0	Steady	0	Steady
Wyoming	At-large	1	1	▲1	0	Steady	0	Steady
Total		332	179 53.9%	▲17	152 45.8%	▼6	1 0.3%	▼5

Popular vote
Democratic	48.68%
Independent	0.54%
Labor	1.41%
Republican	47.36%
Others	2.01%

House seats
Democratic	45.78%
Labor	0.30%
Republican	53.92%

The previous election had 4 third-party candidates, 2 Labor, 1 Greenback, and 1 Independent.

== Election dates ==
All states elected their members November 6, 1888 except, three states, with 7 seats among them:

- June 6: Oregon
- September 4: Vermont
- September 10: Maine

== Alabama ==
District	Incumbent			This race	
District	Member	Party	First elected	Results	Candidates
Alabama 1	James T. Jones	Democratic	1883	Incumbent retired. Democratic hold.	▌ ✓ Richard H. Clarke (Democratic) 62.0%; ▌ Frank H. Threatt (Republican) 38.0%
Alabama 2	Hilary A. Herbert	Democratic	1876	Incumbent re-elected.	▌ ✓ Hilary A. Herbert (Democratic) 66.1%; ▌ C. W. Buckley (Republican) 33.9%
Alabama 3	William C. Oates	Democratic	1880	Incumbent re-elected.	▌ ✓ William C. Oates (Democratic) 82.3%; ▌ A. W. Harvey (Republican) 17.8%
Alabama 4	Alexander C. Davidson	Democratic	1884	Incumbent lost renomination. Democratic hold.	▌ ✓ Louis W. Turpin (Democratic) 77.0%; ▌ J. V. McDuffie (Republican) 23.1%
Alabama 4	Alexander C. Davidson	Democratic	1884	Election successfully contested. New member seated June 4, 1890. Republican gain.	▌ ✓ J. V. McDuffie (Republican); ▌ Louis W. Turpin (Democratic)
Alabama 5	James E. Cobb	Democratic	1886	Incumbent re-elected.	▌ ✓ James E. Cobb (Democratic) 64.7%; ▌ J. H. Bingham (Republican) 35.3%
Alabama 6	John H. Bankhead	Democratic	1886	Incumbent re-elected.	▌ ✓ John H. Bankhead (Democratic) 67.8%; ▌ William C. Hanlan (Republican) 32.3%
Alabama 7	William H. Forney	Democratic	1874	Incumbent re-elected.	▌ ✓ William H. Forney (Democratic) 65.7%; ▌ J. D. Hardy (Republican) 30.7%; ▌ George F. Gaither (Labor) 3.6%
Alabama 8	Joseph Wheeler	Democratic	1880	Incumbent re-elected.	▌ ✓ Joseph Wheeler (Democratic) 61.6%; ▌ John B. McClellan (Republican) 38.4%

== Arizona Territory ==
See Non-voting delegates, below.

== Arkansas ==
District	Incumbent			This race	
District	Member	Party	First elected	Results	Candidates
Arkansas 1	Poindexter Dunn	Democratic	1878	Incumbent retired. Democratic hold.	▌ ✓ William H. Cate (Democratic) 51.9%; ▌Lewis P. Featherstone (Labor) 47.4%; Others 0.6%
Arkansas 1	Poindexter Dunn	Democratic	1878	Election successfully contested. New member seated March 5, 1890. Labor gain.	▌ ✓ Lewis P. Featherstone (Labor); ▌William H. Cate (Democratic)
Arkansas 2	Clifton R. Breckinridge	Democratic	1882	Incumbent re-elected. Seat declared vacant September 5, 1890 due to election challenge.	▌ ✓ Clifton R. Breckinridge (Democratic) 51.2%; ▌John M. Clayton (Republican) 48.8%
Arkansas 3	Thomas C. McRae	Democratic	1884	Incumbent re-elected.	▌ ✓ Thomas C. McRae (Democratic) 59.7%; ▌John Ansley (Labor) 40.3%
Arkansas 4	John H. Rogers	Democratic	1884	Incumbent re-elected.	▌ ✓ John H. Rogers (Democratic) 57.8%; ▌Isaac McCacken (Independent) 42.2%
Arkansas 5	Samuel W. Peel	Democratic	1884	Incumbent re-elected.	▌ ✓ Samuel W. Peel (Democratic) 68.9%; ▌Edward P. Watson (Independent) 22.0%; ▌John Gates (Republican) 9.1%

In the 1st district, initial returns showed William H. Cate (Democratic) winning the election, but the election was contested by Lewis P. Featherstone (Labor), and on May 5, 1890, he was declared the winner.

In the 2nd district, Clifton R. Breckinridge (Democratic) was initially declared re-elected. John M. Clayton successfully contested the election, but was assassinated before the contest was complete, so the House declared the seat vacant. Breckinridge was subsequently re-elected November 4, 1890 to finish the term.

== California ==
District	Incumbent			This race	
District	Member	Party	First elected	Results	Candidates
California 1	Thomas Larkin Thompson	Democratic	1886	Incumbent lost re-election. Republican gain.	▌ ✓ John J. De Haven (Republican) 49.9%; ▌Thomas L. Thompson (Democratic) 49%; ▌W. D. Reynolds (Independent) 1.1%
California 2	Marion Biggs	Democratic	1886	Incumbent re-elected.	▌ ✓ Marion Biggs (Democratic) 50.6%; ▌John A. Eagon (Republican) 46.6%; ▌S. M. McLean (Prohibition) 2.4%; ▌J. F. McSwain (Independent) 0.4%
California 3	Joseph McKenna	Republican	1884	Incumbent re-elected.	▌ ✓ Joseph McKenna (Republican) 56.0%; ▌Ben Morgan (Democratic) 41.2%; ▌W. W. Smith (Prohibition) 1.9%; ▌S. Solon Holl (Independent) 1.0%
California 4	William W. Morrow	Republican	1884	Incumbent re-elected.	▌ ✓ William W. Morrow (Republican) 50.8%; ▌Robert Ferral (Democratic) 48.6%; ▌Frank M. Pixley (American) 0.6%
California 5	Charles N. Felton	Republican	1884	Incumbent retired. Democratic gain.	▌ ✓ Thomas J. Clunie (Democratic) 49.3%; ▌Timothy G. Phelps (Republican) 49.2%; ▌Henry French (Independent)
California 6	William Vandever	Republican	1886	Incumbent re-elected.	▌ ✓ William Vandever (Republican) 52.5%; ▌Reel B. Terry (Democratic) 43.7%; ▌J. G. Miller (Prohibition) 3.5%; ▌Alfred Daggett (American) 0.2%

== Colorado ==
District	Incumbent			This race	
District	Member	Party	First elected	Results	Candidates
Colorado at-large	George G. Symes	Republican	1884	Incumbent retired. Republican hold.	▌ ✓ Hosea Townsend (Republican) 55.0%; ▌ Thomas Macon (Democratic) 41.0%; ▌ John Hipp (Prohibition) 2.6%; ▌ R. A. Southworth (Union Labor) 1.4%

== Connecticut ==
District	Incumbent			This race	
District	Member	Party	First elected	Results	Candidates
Connecticut 1	Robert J. Vance	Democratic	1886	Incumbent lost re-election. Republican gain.	▌ ✓ William E. Simonds (Republican) 49.7%; ▌Robert J. Vance (Democratic) 47.5%; ▌Frederick G. Platt (Prohibition) 2.7%; ▌Horace S. Frye (Labor) 0.1%
Connecticut 2	Carlos French	Democratic	1886	Incumbent retired. Democratic hold.	▌ ✓ Washington F. Willcox (Democratic) 49.6%; ▌H. Wales Lines (Republican) 48.1%; ▌Edwin P. Augur (Prohibition) 2.3%; ▌D. W. Ventres (Labor) 0.0%
Connecticut 3	Charles A. Russell	Republican	1886	Incumbent re-elected.	▌ ✓ Charles A. Russell (Republican) 49.8%; ▌Stephen H. Hall (Democratic) 46.6%; ▌John A. Rockwell (Prohibition) 3.6%
Connecticut 4	Miles T. Granger	Democratic	1886	Incumbent retired. Republican gain.	▌ ✓ Frederick Miles (Republican) 48.7%; ▌Edward W. Seymour (Democratic) 48.7%; ▌Elisha Z. Ellis (Prohibition) 2.5%

== Delaware ==
District	Incumbent			This race	
District	Member	Party	First elected	Results	Candidates
Delaware at-large	John B. Penington	Democratic	1886	Incumbent re-elected.	▌ ✓ John B. Penington (Democratic) 55.2%; ▌ Charles H. Treat (Republican) 43.5%; ▌ Charles E. Register (Prohibition) 1.3%

== Florida ==
District	Incumbent			This race	
District	Member	Party	First elected	Results	Candidates
Florida 1	Robert H. M. Davidson	Democratic	1876	Incumbent re-elected.	▌ ✓ Robert H. M. Davidson (Democratic) 67.1%; ▌H. R. Benjamin (Republican) 32.9%
Florida 2	Charles Dougherty	Democratic	1884	Incumbent retired. Democratic hold	▌ ✓ Robert Bullock (Democratic) 53.5%; ▌Frederick S. Goodrich (Republican) 46.5%

== Georgia ==
District	Incumbent			This race	
District	Member	Party	First elected	Results	Candidates
Georgia 1	Thomas M. Norwood	Democratic	1884	Incumbent retired. Democratic hold.	▌ ✓ Rufus E. Lester (Democratic) 69.6%; ▌ Floyd Snelson (Republican) 30.4%
Georgia 2	Henry G. Turner	Democratic	1880	Incumbent re-elected.	▌ ✓ Henry G. Turner (Democratic) 100.0%
Georgia 3	Charles F. Crisp	Democratic	1882	Incumbent re-elected.	▌ ✓ Charles F. Crisp (Democratic) 72.7%; ▌ Peter O. Gibson (Republican) 24.6%
Georgia 4	Thomas W. Grimes	Democratic	1886	Incumbent re-elected.	▌ ✓ Thomas W. Grimes (Democratic) 70.4%; ▌ Marion Bethune (Republican) 29.6%
Georgia 5	John D. Stewart	Democratic	1886	Incumbent re-elected.	▌ ✓ John D. Stewart (Democratic) 68.6%; ▌ George S. Thomas (Republican) 31.4%
Georgia 6	James Henderson Blount	Democratic	1872	Incumbent re-elected.	▌ ✓ James Henderson Blount (Democratic) 100.0%
Georgia 7	Judson C. Clements	Democratic	1880	Incumbent re-elected.	▌ ✓ Judson C. Clements (Democratic) 74.8%; ▌ Zack B. Hargrove (Republican) 25.2%
Georgia 8	Henry H. Carlton	Democratic	1886	Incumbent re-elected.	▌ ✓ Henry H. Carlton (Democratic) 76.7%; ▌ E. T. Fleming (Republican) 23.3%
Georgia 9	Allen D. Candler	Democratic	1882	Incumbent re-elected.	▌ ✓ Allen D. Candler (Democratic) 53.0%; ▌ Thaddeus Pickett (Independent) 47.0%
Georgia 10	George Barnes	Democratic	1884	Incumbent re-elected.	▌ ✓ George Barnes (Democratic) 89.0%; ▌ Judson W. Lyon (Republican) 11.0%

== Idaho Territory ==
See Non-voting delegates, below.

== Illinois ==
District	Incumbent			This race	
District	Member	Party	First elected	Results	Candidates
Illinois 1	Ransom W. Dunham	Republican	1882	Incumbent retired. Republican hold.	▌ ✓ Abner Taylor (Republican) 52.7%; ▌ James F. Todd (Democratic) 45.1%; ▌ [FNU] Taylor (Prohibition) 1.9%; ▌ [FNU] Laramie (Labor) 0.3%
Illinois 2	Frank Lawler	Democratic	1884	Incumbent re-elected.	▌ ✓ Frank Lawler (Democratic) 59.2%; ▌ Daniel F. Gleason (Republican) 40.3%; ▌ [FNU] Sibley (Prohibition) 0.5%
Illinois 3	William E. Mason	Republican	1886	Incumbent re-elected.	▌ ✓ William E. Mason (Republican) 50.8%; ▌ Milton R. Freshwater (Democratic) 45.7%; ▌ [FNU] Stauber (Labor) 1.9%; ▌ [FNU] Davis (Prohibition) 1.6%
Illinois 4	George E. Adams	Republican	1882	Incumbent re-elected.	▌ ✓ George E. Adams (Republican) 51.3%; ▌ Jonathan B. Taylor (Democratic) 45.5%; ▌ L. D. Rogers (Prohibition) 3.0%; ▌ Henry D. Lloyd (Labor) 0.2%
Illinois 5	Albert J. Hopkins	Republican	1885	Incumbent re-elected.	▌ ✓ Albert J. Hopkins (Republican) 63.0%; ▌ James Herrington (Democratic) 31.4%; ▌ John M. Strong (Prohibition) 5.5%
Illinois 6	Robert R. Hitt	Republican	1882	Incumbent re-elected.	▌ ✓ Robert R. Hitt (Republican) 57.2%; ▌ Rufus M. Cook (Democratic) 37.6%; ▌ George Richardson (Prohibition) 5.2%
Illinois 7	Thomas J. Henderson	Republican	1874	Incumbent re-elected.	▌ ✓ Thomas J. Henderson (Republican) 56.7%; ▌ Owen G. Lovejoy (Democratic) 39.2%; ▌ A. M. Henson (Prohibition) 4.1%
Illinois 8	Ralph Plumb	Republican	1884	Incumbent retired. Republican hold.	▌ ✓ Charles A. Hill (Republican) 51.4%; ▌ Lafayette W. Brewer (Democratic) 43.6%; ▌ James S. Reber (Prohibition) 4.2%; ▌ John McLaughlin (Labor) 0.8%
Illinois 9	Lewis E. Payson	Republican	1880	Incumbent re-elected.	▌ ✓ Lewis E. Payson (Republican) 51.5%; ▌ Herman W. Snow (Democratic) 44.2%; ▌ M. C. Smith (Prohibition) 4.3%
Illinois 10	Philip S. Post	Republican	1886	Incumbent re-elected.	▌ ✓ Philip S. Post (Republican) 52.6%; ▌ Nicholas E. Worthington (Democratic) 45.2%; ▌ James H. Sedgwick (Prohibition) 2.2%
Illinois 11	William H. Gest	Republican	1886	Incumbent re-elected.	▌ ✓ William H. Gest (Republican) 51.3%; ▌ William Prentiss (Democratic) 45.8%; ▌ [FNU] McIntosh (Prohibition) 2.9%
Illinois 12	George A. Anderson	Democratic	1886	Incumbent retired. Democratic hold.	▌ ✓ Scott Wike (Democratic) 54.1%; ▌ William H. Collins (Republican) 41.0%
Illinois 13	William McKendree Springer	Democratic	1874	Incumbent re-elected.	▌ ✓ William McKendree Springer (Democratic) 51.4%; ▌ Charles Kerr (Republican) 44.4%; ▌ Lafe Swing (Prohibition) 3.6%; ▌ John Alsbury (Labor) 0.6%
Illinois 14	Jonathan H. Rowell	Republican	1882	Incumbent re-elected.	▌ ✓ Jonathan H. Rowell (Republican) 50.1%; ▌ Ethelbert Stewart (Democratic/Labor) 45.2%; ▌ A. F. Smith (Prohibition) 4.7%
Illinois 15	Joseph Gurney Cannon	Republican	1872	Incumbent re-elected.	▌ ✓ Joseph Gurney Cannon (Republican) 51.8%; ▌ Robert L. McKinley (Democratic) 44.8%; ▌ [FNU] Sheldon (Prohibition) 2.9%; ▌ Alec C. Barton (Labor) 0.5%
Illinois 16	Silas Z. Landes	Democratic	1884	Incumbent retired. Democratic hold.	▌ ✓ George W. Fithian (Democratic) 49.6%; ▌ Edwin Harlan (Republican) 47.6%; ▌ Hale Johnson (Prohibition) 1.9%; ▌ Thomas Ratcliff (Labor) 0.9%
Illinois 17	Edward Lane	Democratic	1886	Incumbent re-elected.	▌ ✓ Edward Lane (Democratic) 54.8%; ▌ John J. Brown (Republican) 41.7%; ▌ Jasper L. Douthit (Prohibition) 3.5%
Illinois 18	Jehu Baker	Republican	1886	Incumbent lost re-election. Democratic gain	▌ ✓ William S. Forman (Democratic) 47.7%; ▌ Jehu Baker (Republican) 47.7%; ▌ George W. Wickline (Labor) 2.7%; ▌ W. W. Edwards (Prohibition) 1.9%
Illinois 19	Richard W. Townshend	Democratic	1876	Incumbent re-elected.	▌ ✓ Richard W. Townshend (Democratic) 53.0%; ▌ W. L. Crim (Republican) 45.8%
Illinois 20	John R. Thomas	Republican	1878	Incumbent retired. Republican hold.	▌ ✓ George Washington Smith (Republican) 51.6%; ▌ Thomas T. Robinson (Democratic/Labor) 46.6%; ▌ [FNU] McReynolds (Prohibition) 1.7%

== Indiana ==
District	Incumbent			This race	
District	Member	Party	First elected	Results	Candidates
Indiana 1	Francis B. Posey	Republican	1889	Incumbent lost re-election. Democratic gain.	▌ ✓ William F. Parrett (Democratic) 49.3%; ▌ Francis B. Posey (Republican) 49.3%; ▌ [FNU] Dewhurst (Prohibition) 1.0%; ▌ J. J. Chapman (Labor) 0.4%
Indiana 2	John H. O'Neall	Democratic	1886	Incumbent re-elected.	▌ ✓ John H. O'Neall (Democratic) 52.3%; ▌ Thomas N. Braxton (Republican) 47.0%; ▌ Garland Blewitt (Prohibition) 0.7%
Indiana 3	Jonas G. Howard	Democratic	1884	Incumbent lost renomination. Democratic hold.	▌ ✓ Jason B. Brown (Democratic) 54.0%; ▌ Stephen D. Sayles (Republican) 44.9%; ▌ Moses G. Poindexter (Prohibition) 0.8%; ▌ W. H. Carr (Labor) 0.3%
Indiana 4	William S. Holman	Democratic	1880	Incumbent re-elected.	▌ ✓ William S. Holman (Democratic) 50.7%; ▌ Manly D. Wilson (Republican) 48.5%; ▌ [FNU] Caster (Prohibition) 0.8%
Indiana 5	Courtland C. Matson	Democratic	1880	Incumbent retired to run for Governor of Indiana. Democratic hold.	▌ ✓ George W. Cooper (Democratic) 49.6%; ▌ Henry C. Duncan (Republican) 47.7%; ▌ W. J. Beckett (Prohibition) 2.1%; ▌ John Harryman (Labor) 0.6%
Indiana 6	Thomas M. Browne	Republican	1876	Incumbent re-elected.	▌ ✓ Thomas M. Browne (Republican) 60.3%; ▌ Douglas J. Morris (Democratic) 36.8%; ▌ John A. Pollock (Prohibition) 2.5%; ▌ Timothy Taylor (Labor) 0.4%
Indiana 7	William D. Bynum	Democratic	1884	Incumbent re-elected.	▌ ✓ William D. Bynum (Democratic) 50.9%; ▌ Thomas E. Chandler (Republican) 47.6%; ▌ [FNU] Eaton (Prohibition) 1.5%
Indiana 8	James T. Johnston	Republican	1884	Incumbent lost re-election. Democratic gain.	▌ ✓ Elijah V. Brookshire (Democratic) 49.0%; ▌ James T. Johnston (Republican) 48.8%; ▌ Lewis H. Johnson (Labor) 1.2%; ▌ John G. L. Myers (Prohibition) 1.0%
Indiana 9	Joseph B. Cheadle	Republican	1886	Incumbent re-elected.	▌ ✓ Joseph B. Cheadle (Republican) 53.1%; ▌ James McCabe (Democratic) 43.5%; ▌ Aaron Walker (Prohibition) 2.7%; ▌ Louis S. Snyder (Labor) 0.7%
Indiana 10	William D. Owen	Republican	1884	Incumbent re-elected.	▌ ✓ William D. Owen (Republican) 50.4%; ▌ Valentine Zimmerman (Democratic) 47.5%; ▌ [FNU] Overholzer (Prohibition) 1.8%; ▌ Martin Johnson (Labor) 0.3%
Indiana 11	George Washington Steele	Republican	1880	Incumbent lost re-election. Democratic gain.	▌ ✓ Augustus N. Martin (Democratic) 48.9%; ▌ George Washington Steele (Republican) 47.8%; ▌ [FNU] Ryker (Prohibition) 3.1%; ▌ William T. Shull (Labor) 0.2%
Indiana 12	James Bain White	Republican	1886	Incumbent lost re-election. Democratic gain.	▌ ✓ Charles A. O. McClellan (Democratic) 50.4%; ▌ James Bain White (Republican) 47.1%; ▌ George T. Butler (Prohibition) 2.1%; ▌ P. P. Minor (Labor) 0.4%
Indiana 13	Benjamin F. Shively	Democratic	1886	Incumbent re-elected.	▌ ✓ Benjamin F. Shively (Democratic/Labor) 49.4%; ▌ William J. Hoynes (Republican) 48.6%; ▌ [FNU] Huntsinger (Prohibition) 2.0%

== Iowa ==
District	Incumbent			This race	
District	Member	Party	First elected	Results	Candidates
Iowa 1	John H. Gear	Republican	1886	Incumbent re-elected.	▌ ✓ John H. Gear (Republican) 51.0%; ▌ John J. Seerley (Democratic) 48.5%; ▌ C. H. Bandy (Prohibition) 0.5%
Iowa 2	Walter I. Hayes	Democratic	1886	Incumbent re-elected.	▌ ✓ Walter I. Hayes (Democratic) 56.8%; ▌ Parker W. McManus (Republican/Labor) 43.1%
Iowa 3	David B. Henderson	Republican	1882	Incumbent re-elected.	▌ ✓ David B. Henderson (Republican) 56.0%; ▌ Benjamin B. Richards (Democratic) 44.0%
Iowa 4	William E. Fuller	Republican	1884	Incumbent lost renomination. Republican hold.	▌ ✓ Joseph Henry Sweney (Republican) 52.4%; ▌ L. S. Reque (Democratic) 46.2%; ▌ L. H. Weller (Labor) 1.1%; ▌ H. G. Parker (Prohibition) 0.3%
Iowa 5	Daniel Kerr	Republican	1886	Incumbent re-elected.	▌ ✓ Daniel Kerr (Republican) 52.5%; ▌ J. H. Preston (Democratic) 45.7%; ▌ W. H. Calhoun (Labor) 1.1%; ▌ E. J. Helms (Prohibition) 0.7%
Iowa 6	James B. Weaver	Greenback	1884	Incumbent lost re-election as a Democratic/Labor candidate. Republican gain.	▌ ✓ John F. Lacey (Republican) 51.0%; ▌ James B. Weaver (Democratic/Labor) 48.6%; ▌ C. L. Haskell (Prohibition) 0.4%
Iowa 7	Edwin H. Conger	Republican	1884	Incumbent re-elected.	▌ ✓ Edwin H. Conger (Republican) 55.8%; ▌ A. E. Morrison (Democratic) 39.5%
Iowa 8	Albert R. Anderson	Independent Republican	1886	Incumbent lost re-election. Republican gain.	▌ ✓ James P. Flick (Republican) 50.9%; ▌ Albert R. Anderson (Ind. Republican/Democratic) 48.2%; ▌ S. A. Gilley (Prohibition) 0.7%; ▌ George C. Calkins (Labor) 0.2%
Iowa 9	Joseph Lyman	Republican	1884	Incumbent retired. Republican hold.	▌ ✓ Joseph Rea Reed (Republican) 52.6%; ▌ Daniel M. Harris (Democratic) 43.0%; ▌ J. R. Sovereign (Labor) 4.2%; ▌ C. B. Christie (Prohibition) 0.2%
Iowa 10	Adoniram J. Holmes	Republican	1882	Incumbent lost renomination. Republican hold.	▌ ✓ Jonathan P. Dolliver (Republican) 56.8%; ▌ J. A. Yeoman (Democratic) 42.2%; ▌ Oliver Tyson (Labor) 1.0%
Iowa 11	Isaac S. Struble	Republican	1882	Incumbent re-elected.	▌ ✓ Isaac S. Struble (Republican) 57.1%; ▌ M. A. Kilso (Democratic) 40.4%; ▌ George W. Lee (Labor) 1.8%; ▌ Wilmot Whitfield (Prohibition) 0.7%

== Kansas ==
District	Incumbent			This race	
District	Member	Party	First elected	Results	Candidates
Kansas 1	Edmund N. Morrill	Republican	1882	Incumbent re-elected.	▌ ✓ Edmund N. Morrill (Republican) 56.3%; ▌ Ephraim K. Townsend (Democratic) 39.2%; ▌ Alonzo J. Grover (Union Labor) 3.3%; ▌ Hiram Shoemaker (Prohibition) 1.2%
Kansas 2	Edward H. Funston	Republican	1884	Incumbent re-elected.	▌ ✓ Edward H. Funston (Republican) 54.6%; ▌ John T. Burris (Democratic) 33.2%; ▌ Delos Walker (Union Labor) 12.2%
Kansas 3	Bishop W. Perkins	Republican	1882	Incumbent re-elected.	▌ ✓ Bishop W. Perkins (Republican) 50.4%; ▌ W. H. Utley (Union Labor) 25.5%; ▌ John A. Eaton (Democratic) 22.8%; ▌ Cyrus W. Harvey (Prohibition) 1.3%
Kansas 4	Thomas Ryan	Republican	1876	Incumbent re-elected.	▌ ✓ Thomas Ryan (Republican) 59.8%; ▌ D. Overmeyer (Democratic) 29.2%; ▌ John Heaton (Union Labor) 8.9%
Kansas 5	John Alexander Anderson	Republican	1878	Incumbent re-elected.	▌ ✓ John Alexander Anderson (Republican) 59.6%; ▌ N. D. Toby (Democratic) 37.4%; ▌ E. Leonardson (Union Labor) 3.0%
Kansas 6	Erastus J. Turner	Republican	1886	Incumbent re-elected.	▌ ✓ Erastus J. Turner (Republican) 57.4%; ▌ S. W. McElroy (Democratic) 30.1%; ▌ S. A. Hart (Union Labor) 11.2%; ▌ S. P. Stevens (Prohibition) 1.3%
Kansas 7	Samuel R. Peters	Republican	1882	Incumbent re-elected.	▌ ✓ Samuel R. Peters (Republican) 53.2%; ▌ Charles S. Ebey (Democratic) 31.7%; ▌ S. H. Snyder (Union Labor) 13.3%; ▌ E. W. Beeson (Prohibition) 1.5%

== Kentucky ==
District	Incumbent			This race	
District	Member	Party	First elected	Results	Candidates
Kentucky 1	William Johnson Stone	Democratic	1884	Incumbent re-elected.	▌ ✓ William Johnson Stone (Democratic) 60.2%; ▌ Edwin Earley (Republican) 37.6%; ▌ Josiah Harris (Prohibition) 2.2%
Kentucky 2	Polk Laffoon	Democratic	1884	Incumbent retired. Democratic hold.	▌ ✓ William T. Ellis (Democratic) 54.8%; ▌ George W. Jolly (Republican) 43.3%; ▌ William L. Gordon (Prohibition) 1.9%
Kentucky 3	W. Godfrey Hunter	Republican	1886	Incumbent lost re-election. Democratic gain.	▌ ✓ Isaac Goodnight (Democratic) 52.4%; ▌ W. Godfrey Hunter (Republican) 47.1%; ▌ Eugene Underwood (Prohibition) 0.5%
Kentucky 4	Alexander B. Montgomery	Democratic	1886	Incumbent re-elected.	▌ ✓ Alexander B. Montgomery (Democratic) 57.9%; ▌ C. M. Pendleton (Republican) 41.3%; ▌ Galt W. Boothe (Prohibition) 0.8%
Kentucky 5	Asher G. Caruth	Democratic	1886	Incumbent re-elected.	▌ ✓ Asher G. Caruth (Democratic) 54.9%; ▌ Augustus E. Willson (Republican) 44.9%; ▌ E. J. Polk (Prohibition) 0.2%
Kentucky 6	John G. Carlisle	Democratic	1876	Incumbent re-elected.	▌ ✓ John G. Carlisle (Democratic) 58.7%; ▌ Robert Hamilton (Republican) 40.0%; ▌ W. R. Fox (Labor) 0.7%; ▌ Scott Shoemaker (Prohibition) 0.6%
Kentucky 7	W. C. P. Breckinridge	Democratic	1884	Incumbent re-elected.	▌ ✓ W. C. P. Breckinridge (Democratic) 57.5%; ▌ Armstead M. Swope (Republican) 40.3%; ▌ Alfred Cobb (Prohibition) 2.2%
Kentucky 8	James B. McCreary	Democratic	1884	Incumbent re-elected.	▌ ✓ James B. McCreary (Democratic) 51.5%; ▌ R. L. Ewell (Republican) 46.6%; ▌ John A. Noe (Prohibition) 1.9%
Kentucky 9	George M. Thomas	Republican	1886	Incumbent retired. Democratic gain.	▌ ✓ Thomas H. Paynter (Democratic) 49.9%; ▌ Drury J. Burchett (Republican) 48.9%; ▌ George W. Young (Prohibition) 1.2%
Kentucky 10	William P. Taulbee	Democratic	1884	Incumbent retired. Republican gain.	▌ ✓ John H. Wilson (Republican) 50.6%; ▌ Benjamin F. Day (Democratic) 49.1%; ▌ James M. Rash (Prohibition) 0.3%
Kentucky 11	Hugh F. Finley	Republican	1886	Incumbent re-elected.	▌ ✓ Hugh F. Finley (Republican) 52.4%; ▌ Frank Lane Wolford (Democratic) 46.4%; ▌ J. G. Stephenson (Prohibition) 1.2%

== Louisiana ==
District	Incumbent			This race	
District	Member	Party	First elected	Results	Candidates
Louisiana 1	Theodore S. Wilkinson	Democratic	1886	Incumbent re-elected.	▌ ✓ Theodore S. Wilkinson (Democratic) 64.5%; ▌ Charles B. Wilson (Republican) 35.4%
Louisiana 2	Matthew D. Lagan	Democratic	1886	Incumbent retired. Republican gain.	▌ ✓ Hamilton D. Coleman (Republican) 50.5%; ▌ Benjamin C. Elliott (Democratic) 49.5%
Louisiana 3	Edward J. Gay	Democratic	1884	Incumbent re-elected.	▌ ✓ Edward J. Gay (Democratic) 74.8%; ▌ James R. Jolley (Republican) 25.2%
Louisiana 4	Newton C. Blanchard	Democratic	1880	Incumbent re-elected.	▌ ✓ Newton C. Blanchard (Democratic) 94.4%; ▌ William E. Maples (Republican) 5.6%
Louisiana 5	Cherubusco Newton	Democratic	1886	Incumbent lost renomination. Democratic hold.	▌ ✓ Charles J. Boatner (Democratic) 93.9%; ▌ Frank Morey (Republican) 5.1%
Louisiana 6	Samuel M. Robertson	Democratic	1887	Incumbent re-elected.	▌ ✓ Samuel M. Robertson (Democratic) 73.7%; ▌ W. H. Harrison (Republican) 26.3%

== Maine ==
District	Incumbent			This race	
District	Member	Party	First elected	Results	Candidates
Maine 1	Thomas B. Reed	Republican	1876	Incumbent re-elected.	▌ ✓ Thomas B. Reed (Republican) 52.30%; ▌William Emery (Democratic) 45.33%; ▌Timothy B. Hussey (Prohibition) 2.37%
Maine 2	Nelson Dingley Jr.	Republican	1881 (special)	Incumbent re-elected.	▌ ✓ Nelson Dingley Jr. (Republican) 55.17%; ▌Charles E. Allen (Democratic) 40.87%; ▌Ebenezer A. Howard (Union Labor) 2.05%; ▌William T. Eustis (Prohibition) 1.91%
Maine 3	Seth L. Milliken	Republican	1882	Incumbent re-elected.	▌ ✓ Seth L. Milliken (Republican) 57.95%; ▌Simon S. Brown (Democratic) 39.54%; ▌Binsley S. Kelley (Prohibition) 1.51%; ▌Frank A. Howard (Union Labor) 0.99%
Maine 4	Charles A. Boutelle	Republican	1882	Incumbent re-elected.	▌ ✓ Charles A. Boutelle (Republican) 54.64%; ▌Thomas S. Stewart (Democratic) 42.67%; ▌John Barker (Prohibition) 2.68%

== Maryland ==
District	Incumbent			This race	
District	Member	Party	First elected	Results	Candidates
Maryland 1	Charles H. Gibson	Democratic	1884	Incumbent re-elected.	▌ ✓ Charles H. Gibson (Democratic) 48.3%; ▌ Thomas S. Hodson (Republican) 46.8%; ▌ Walter F. Harman (Prohibition) 4.9%
Maryland 2	Frank T. Shaw	Democratic	1884	Incumbent lost renomination. Democratic hold.	▌ ✓ Herman Stump (Democratic) 51.2%; ▌ Theodore F. Lang (Republican) 46.0%; ▌ Joshua L. Benson (Prohibition) 2.8%
Maryland 3	Harry W. Rusk	Democratic	1886	Incumbent re-elected.	▌ ✓ Harry W. Rusk (Democratic) 57.2%; ▌ Daniel L. Brinton (Republican) 41.7%; ▌ John B. Dunning (Prohibition) 1.1%
Maryland 4	Isidor Rayner	Democratic	1886	Incumbent lost re-election. Republican gain.	▌ ✓ Henry Stockbridge Jr. (Republican) 49.5%; ▌ Isidor Rayner (Democratic) 49.3%; ▌ William H. Reed (Prohibition) 1.2%
Maryland 5	Barnes Compton	Democratic	1884	Incumbent re-elected.	▌ ✓ Barnes Compton (Democratic) 49.8%; ▌ Sydney E. Mudd I (Republican) 49.2%; ▌ William H. Hellen (Prohibition) 1.0%
Maryland 5	Barnes Compton	Democratic	1884	Election successfully contested. New member seated March 20, 1890. Republican gain.	▌ ✓ Sydney E. Mudd I (Republican) 49.8%; ▌ Barnes Compton (Democratic) 49.2%; ▌ William H. Hellen (Prohibition) 1.0%
Maryland 6	Louis E. McComas	Republican	1882	Incumbent re-elected.	▌ ✓ Louis E. McComas (Republican) 51.6%; ▌ Henry Kyd Douglas (Democratic) 47.2%; ▌ J. W. Moore (Prohibition) 1.2%

== Massachusetts ==
District	Incumbent			This race	
District	Member	Party	First elected	Results	Candidates
Massachusetts 1	Robert T. Davis	Republican	1882	Incumbent retired. Republican hold.	▌ ✓ Charles S. Randall (Republican) 60.86%; ▌John W. Cummings (Democratic) 21.29%; ▌George Delano (Prohibition) 14.47%; ▌William Miller (Labor) 3.38%
Massachusetts 2	John Davis Long	Republican	1882	Incumbent retired. Republican hold.	▌ ✓ Elijah A. Morse (Republican) 54.75%; ▌Josiah Quincy VI (Democratic) 42.94%; ▌William H. Phillips (Prohibition) 3.31%
Massachusetts 3	Leopold Morse	Democratic	1886	Incumbent retired. Democratic hold.	▌ ✓ John F. Andrew (Democratic) 52.03%; ▌Alanson W. Beard (Republican) 47.07%; ▌Henry H. Shugg (Prohibition) 0.89%
Massachusetts 4	Patrick Collins	Democratic	1882	Incumbent retired. Democratic hold.	▌ ✓ Joseph Henry O'Neil (Democratic) 68.11%; ▌Peter Morrison (Republican) 31.02%; ▌Frederic G. Whitcomb (Prohibition) 0.86%
Massachusetts 5	Edward D. Hayden	Republican	1886	Incumbent retired. Republican hold.	▌ ✓ Nathaniel P. Banks (Republican) 51.80%; ▌Thomas Wentworth Higginson (Democratic) 46.72%; ▌Edward Kendall (Prohibition) 1.47%
Massachusetts 6	Henry Cabot Lodge	Republican	1886	Incumbent re-elected.	▌ ✓ Henry Cabot Lodge (Republican) 56.34%; ▌Roland G. Usher (Democratic) 41.12%; ▌George A. Crossman (Prohibition) 2.54%
Massachusetts 7	William Cogswell	Republican	1886	Incumbent re-elected.	▌ ✓ William Cogswell (Republican) 57.07%; ▌Samuel Roads Jr. (Democratic) 41.09%; ▌James J. Gregory (Prohibition) 1.84%
Massachusetts 8	Charles Herbert Allen	Republican	1886	Incumbent not re-nominated. Republican hold.	▌ ✓ Frederic T. Greenhalge (Republican) 55.27%; ▌John J. Donovan (Democratic) 42.99%; ▌Nathaniel A. Glidden (Prohibition) 1.74%
Massachusetts 9	Edward Burnett	Democratic	1886	Incumbent lost re-election. Republican gain.	▌ ✓ John W. Candler (Republican) 52.19%; ▌Edward Burnett (Democratic) 45.43%; ▌John C. Park (Prohibition) 2.39%
Massachusetts 10	John E. Russell	Democratic	1886	Incumbent retired. Republican gain.	▌ ✓ Joseph H. Walker (Republican) 52.01%; ▌Irving B. Sayles (Democratic) 44.88%; ▌Charles G. Allen (Prohibition) 3.11%
Massachusetts 11	William Whiting II	Republican	1882	Incumbent re-elected.	▌ ✓ William Whiting II (Republican) 56.36%; ▌William Skinner (Democratic) 39.75%; ▌Hervey S. Cowell (Prohibition) 3.89%
Massachusetts 12	Francis W. Rockwell	Republican	1884	Incumbent re-elected.	▌ ✓ Francis W. Rockwell (Republican) 52.13%; ▌Henry W. Ely (Democratic) 45.02%; ▌Henry Cutler (Prohibition) 2.85%

== Michigan ==
District	Incumbent			This race	
District	Member	Party	First elected	Results	Candidates
Michigan 1	J. Logan Chipman	Democratic	1886	Incumbent re-elected.	▌ ✓ J. Logan Chipman (Democratic) 52.4%; ▌ Hibbard Baker (Republican) 45.9%; ▌ Charles E. Conely (Prohibition) 1.7%
Michigan 2	Edward P. Allen	Republican	1886	Incumbent re-elected.	▌ ✓ Edward P. Allen (Republican) 49.3%; ▌ William Stearns (Democratic/Greenback) 45.3%; ▌ Charles M. Fellows (Prohibition) 5.0%; ▌ John H. Hobart (Labor) 0.4%
Michigan 3	James O'Donnell	Republican	1884	Incumbent re-elected.	▌ ✓ James O'Donnell (Republican) 53.5%; ▌ Eugene Pringle (Democratic) 38.9%; ▌ Almon G. Bruce (Prohibition) 5.8%; ▌ Calvin J. Thorpe (Labor) 1.8%
Michigan 4	Julius C. Burrows	Republican	1884	Incumbent re-elected.	▌ ✓ Julius C. Burrows (Republican) 52.9%; ▌ Charles S. Maynard (Democratic) 42.7%; ▌ George F. Cunningham (Prohibition) 3.7%; ▌ Hampden Kelsey (Labor) 0.7%
Michigan 5	Melbourne H. Ford	Democratic	1886	Incumbent lost re-election. Republican gain.	▌ ✓ Charles E. Belknap (Republican) 50.4%; ▌ Melbourne H. Ford (Democratic) 45.3%; ▌ Byron B. Godfrey (Prohibition) 4.0%; ▌ George H. LaFleur (Labor) 0.3%
Michigan 6	Mark S. Brewer	Republican	1886	Incumbent re-elected.	▌ ✓ Mark S. Brewer (Republican) 47.6%; ▌ Orlando F. Barnes (Democratic) 46.8%; ▌ William W. Root (Prohibition) 5.0%; ▌ John M. Potter (Greenback) 0.6%
Michigan 7	Justin R. Whiting	Democratic	1886	Incumbent re-elected.	▌ ✓ Justin R. Whiting (Democratic) 47.7%; ▌ William Hartsuff (Republican) 46.6%; ▌ Orson Ingalls (Prohibition) 2.9%; ▌ Lansing E. Lincoln (Labor) 2.8%
Michigan 8	Timothy E. Tarsney	Democratic	1884	Incumbent lost re-election. Republican gain.	▌ ✓ Aaron T. Bliss (Republican) 50.4%; ▌ Timothy E. Tarsney (Democratic) 45.9%; ▌ Daniel W. Breckenridge (Prohibition) 3.7%
Michigan 9	Byron M. Cutcheon	Republican	1882	Incumbent re-elected.	▌ ✓ Byron M. Cutcheon (Republican) 52.2%; ▌ Hiram B. Hudson (Democratic) 42.2%; ▌ Lathrop S. Ellis (Prohibition) 5.6%
Michigan 10	Spencer O. Fisher	Democratic	1884	Incumbent lost re-election. Republican gain.	▌ ✓ Frank W. Wheeler (Republican) 48.3%; ▌ Spencer O. Fisher (Democratic) 48.0%; ▌ William H. Fulton (Prohibition) 2.0%; ▌ William Henry (Labor) 1.7%
Michigan 11	Henry W. Seymour	Republican	1888	Incumbent lost renomination. Republican hold.	▌ ✓ Samuel M. Stephenson (Republican) 52.8%; ▌ John Power (Democratic) 44.1%; ▌ Orrin E. Downing (Prohibition) 3.1%

== Minnesota ==
District	Incumbent			This race	
District	Member	Party	First elected	Results	Candidates
Minnesota 1	Thomas Wilson	Democratic	1886	Incumbent lost re-election. Republican gain.	▌ ✓ Mark H. Dunnell (Republican) 50.4%; ▌Thomas Wilson (Democratic) 45.4%; ▌Robert Taylor (Prohibition) 4.2%
Minnesota 2	John Lind	Republican	1886	Incumbent re-elected.	▌ ✓ John Lind (Republican) 57.0%; ▌Morton S. Wilkinson (Democratic) 36.5%; ▌David W. Edwards (Prohibition) 6.5%
Minnesota 3	John L. MacDonald	Democratic	1886	Incumbent lost re-election. Republican gain.	▌ ✓ Darwin Hall (Republican) 51.3%; ▌John L. MacDonald (Democratic) 43.7%; ▌Christopher A. Fosness (Prohibition) 4.9%
Minnesota 4	Edmund Rice	Democratic	1886	Incumbent lost re-election. Republican gain.	▌ ✓ Samuel Snider (Republican) 53.8%; ▌Edmund Rice (Democratic) 41.7%; ▌James P. Pinkham (Prohibition) 4.5%
Minnesota 5	Knute Nelson	Republican	1882	Incumbent retired. Republican hold.	▌ ✓ Solomon Comstock (Republican) 52.7%; ▌Charles Canning (Democratic) 40.1%; ▌Zar Scott (Prohibition) 7.2%

== Mississippi ==
District	Incumbent			This race	
District	Member	Party	First elected	Results	Candidates
Mississippi 1	John M. Allen	Democratic	1884	Incumbent re-elected.	▌ ✓ John M. Allen (Democratic) 86.76%; ▌Joseph M. Bynum (Republican) 13.24%
Mississippi 2	James B. Morgan	Democratic	1884	Incumbent re-elected.	▌ ✓ James B. Morgan (Democratic) 70.61%; ▌James R. Chalmers (Republican) 29.39%
Mississippi 3	Thomas C. Catchings	Democratic	1884	Incumbent re-elected.	▌ ✓ Thomas C. Catchings (Democratic) 71.12%; ▌James Hill (Republican) 28.23%; ▌James Witherspoon (Independent) 0.66%
Mississippi 4	Frederick G. Barry	Democratic	1884	Incumbent retired. Democratic hold.	▌ ✓ Clarke Lewis (Democratic) 84.29%; ▌Matthew K. Mister (Republican) 15.71%
Mississippi 5	Chapman L. Anderson	Democratic	1886	Incumbent re-elected.	▌ ✓ Chapman L. Anderson (Democratic) 80.29%; ▌F. M. Cook (Republican) 19.72%
Mississippi 6	T. R. Stockdale	Democratic	1886	Incumbent re-elected.	▌ ✓ T. R. Stockdale (Democratic) 70.33%; ▌Leon C. Duchesne (Republican) 29.67%
Mississippi 7	Charles E. Hooker	Democratic	1886	Incumbent re-elected.	▌ ✓ Charles E. Hooker (Democratic) 75.50%; ▌Henry Kernaghan (Republican) 24.50%

== Missouri ==
District	Incumbent			This race	
District	Member	Party	First elected	Results	Candidates
Missouri 1	William H. Hatch	Democratic	1878	Incumbent re-elected.	▌ ✓ William H. Hatch (Democratic) 52.9%; ▌ Sidney G. Brock (Republican) 45.8%; ▌ Thomas H. Tatlon (Union Labor) 1.3%
Missouri 2	Charles H. Mansur	Democratic	1886	Incumbent re-elected.	▌ ✓ Charles H. Mansur (Democratic) 53.8%; ▌ A. C. Eubanks (Republican) 42.2%; ▌ Larkin Wise (Union Labor) 3.3%; ▌ O. M. Shanklin (Prohibition) 0.7%
Missouri 3	Alexander M. Dockery	Democratic	1882	Incumbent re-elected.	▌ ✓ Alexander M. Dockery (Democratic) 53.4%; ▌ James Love (Republican) 43.8%; ▌ James H. Hillis (Union Labor) 2.8%
Missouri 4	James N. Burnes	Democratic	1882	Incumbent re-elected but died before term started.	▌ ✓ James N. Burnes (Democratic) 52.5%; ▌ Henry R. Hartwig (Republican) 42.7%; ▌ Samuel Black (Union Labor) 4.0%; ▌ Lorenzo D. Cook (Prohibition) 0.8%
Missouri 5	William Warner	Republican	1884	Incumbent retired. Democratic gain.	▌ ✓ John C. Tarsney (Democratic) 52.5%; ▌ Thomas B. Bullene (Republican) 47.5%
Missouri 6	John T. Heard	Democratic	1884	Incumbent re-elected.	▌ ✓ John T. Heard (Democratic) 52.0%; ▌ Joseph P. Upton (Republican) 44.0%; ▌ Joseph Whittaker (Union Labor) 4.0%
Missouri 7	John E. Hutton	Democratic	1884	Incumbent retired. Democratic hold.	▌ ✓ Richard H. Norton (Democratic) 52.8%; ▌ William Walter Edwards (Republican) 47.2%
Missouri 8	John J. O'Neill	Democratic	1882	Incumbent lost re-election. Republican gain.	▌ ✓ Frederick G. Niedringhaus (Republican) 52.2%; ▌ John J. O'Neill (Democratic) 45.5%; ▌ R. C. Langsdon (Union Labor) 2.1%; ▌ Andrew Grassley (Prohibition) 0.2%
Missouri 9	John Milton Glover	Democratic	1884	Incumbent retired to run for governor. Republican gain.	▌ ✓ Nathan Frank (Republican) 54.7%; ▌ George A. Castleman (Democratic) 45.0%; ▌ Frederick H. Ingalls (Prohibition) 0.3%
Missouri 10	Martin L. Clardy	Democratic	1878	Incumbent lost re-election. Republican gain.	▌ ✓ William M. Kinsey (Republican) 50.8%; ▌ Martin L. Clardy (Democratic) 45.2%; ▌ Michael J. Ratchford (Union Labor) 3.7%; ▌ John V. Swart (Prohibition) 0.3%
Missouri 11	Richard P. Bland	Democratic	1872	Incumbent re-elected.	▌ ✓ Richard P. Bland (Democratic) 50.4%; ▌ Thomas H. Musick (Republican) 44.1%; ▌ Jasper Needham (Union Labor) 5.5%
Missouri 12	William J. Stone	Democratic	1884	Incumbent re-elected.	▌ ✓ William J. Stone (Democratic) 49.4%; ▌ John H. Hannah (Republican) 39.9%; ▌ Asa E. Page (Union Labor) 9.5%; ▌ Van B. Wisker (Prohibition) 1.2%
Missouri 13	William H. Wade	Republican	1884	Incumbent re-elected.	▌ ✓ William H. Wade (Republican) 48.4%; ▌ C. C. Matclock (Democratic) 40.0%; ▌ Fred P. Alter (Union Labor) 11.1%
Missouri 14	James P. Walker	Democratic	1886	Incumbent re-elected.	▌ ✓ James P. Walker (Democratic) 58.4%; ▌ Moses Whybark (Republican) 41.6%

== Nebraska ==
District	Incumbent			This race	
District	Member	Party	First elected	Results	Candidates
Nebraska 1	John A. McShane	Democratic	1886	Incumbent retired to run for U.S. senator. Republican gain.	▌ ✓ William J. Connell (Republican) 49.85%; ▌Julius S. Morton (Democratic) 44.69%; ▌Edwin B. Graham (Prohibition) 4.48%; ▌J. W. Edgerton (Labor) 0.98%
Nebraska 2	James Laird	Republican	1882	Incumbent re-elected.	▌ ✓ James Laird (Republican) 53.38%; ▌W. G. Hastings (Democratic) 36.55%; ▌George Scott (Prohibition) 7.12%; ▌R. H. Rohr (Labor) 2.96%
Nebraska 3	George W. E. Dorsey	Republican	1884	Incumbent re-elected.	▌ ✓ George W. E. Dorsey (Republican) 54.16%; ▌E. P. Weatherby (Democratic) 39.95%; ▌A. M. Walling (Prohibition) 3.85%; ▌I. O. Jones (Labor) 1.91%; Scattering 0.13%

== Nevada ==
District	Incumbent			This race	
District	Member	Party	First elected	Results	Candidates
Nevada at-large	William Woodburn	Republican	1884	Incumbent retired. Republican hold.	▌ ✓ Horace F. Bartine (Republican) 54.92%; ▌ George W. Cassidy (Democratic) 45.09%

== New Hampshire ==
District	Incumbent			This race	
District	Member	Party	First elected	Results	Candidates
New Hampshire 1	Luther F. McKinney	Democratic	1886	Incumbent lost re-election. Republican gain.	▌ ✓ Alonzo Nute (Republican) 49.6%; ▌ Luther F. McKinney (Democratic) 48.8%; ▌ Daniel C. Knowles (Prohibition) 1.5%
New Hampshire 2	Jacob H. Gallinger	Republican	1884	Incumbent retired. Republican hold.	▌ ✓ Orren C. Moore (Republican) 50.2%; ▌ Edward F. Mann (Democratic) 48.1%; ▌ Josiah M. Fletcher (Prohibition) 1.6%

== New Jersey ==
District	Incumbent			This race	
District	Member	Party	First elected	Results	Candidates
New Jersey 1	George Hires	Republican	1884	Incumbent retired. Republican hold.	▌ ✓ Christopher A. Bergen (Republican) 53.6%; ▌ William Brindle (Democratic) 41.9%; ▌ William H. Nicholson (Prohibition) 4.5%
New Jersey 2	James Buchanan	Republican	1884	Incumbent re-elected.	▌ ✓ James Buchanan (Republican) 52.4%; ▌ Chauncey H. Beasley (Democratic) 44.6%; ▌ Minot C. Morgan (Prohibition) 3.0%
New Jersey 3	John Kean	Republican	1886	Incumbent lost re-election. Democratic gain.	▌ ✓ Jacob Augustus Geissenhainer (Democratic) 51.7%; ▌ John Kean (Republican) 45.8%; ▌ Noel R. Park (Prohibition) 2.5%
New Jersey 4	James N. Pidcock	Democratic	1884	Incumbent retired. Democratic hold.	▌ ✓ Samuel Fowler (Democratic) 39.4%; ▌ Nathaniel W. Voorhees (Republican) 39.2%; ▌ Charles J. Roe (Independent Democratic) 16.4%; ▌ George Lamonte (Prohibition) 4.9%
New Jersey 5	William Walter Phelps	Republican	1882	Incumbent retired. Republican hold.	▌ ✓ Charles D. Beckwith (Republican) 50.2%; ▌ Mahlon Hoagland (Democratic) 47.6%; ▌ John Winterburn (Prohibition) 2.2%
New Jersey 6	Herman Lehlbach	Republican	1884	Incumbent re-elected.	▌ ✓ Herman Lehlbach (Republican) 49.9%; ▌ Joseph E. Haynes (Democratic) 48.4%; ▌ John R. Anderson (Prohibition) 1.7%
New Jersey 7	William McAdoo	Democratic	1882	Incumbent re-elected.	▌ ✓ William McAdoo (Democratic) 56.1%; ▌ Gilbert Collins (Republican) 43.3%; ▌ Samuel H. Besson (Prohibition) 0.6%

== Montana Territory ==
See Non-voting delegates, below.

== New Mexico Territory ==
See Non-voting delegates, below.

== New York ==
District	Incumbent			This race	
District	Member	Party	First elected	Results	Candidates
New York 1	Perry Belmont	Democratic	1880	Incumbent resigned to become U.S. Minister to Spain. Democratic hold.	▌ ✓ James W. Covert (Democratic) 50.8%; ▌ George Cromwell (Republican) 47.3%; ▌ John P. Ellis (Prohibition) 1.9%
New York 2	Felix Campbell	Democratic	1882	Incumbent re-elected.	▌ ✓ Felix Campbell (Democratic) 56.3%; ▌ Thomas Seward (Republican) 42.2%; ▌ Charles Burke (Prohibition) 1.5%
New York 3	Stephen V. White	Republican	1886	Incumbent retired. Republican hold.	▌ ✓ William C. Wallace (Republican) 52.9%; ▌ William J. Coombs (Democratic) 45.7%; ▌ Henry R. King (Prohibition) 1.4%
New York 4	Peter P. Mahoney	Democratic	1884	Incumbent retired. Democratic hold.	▌ ✓ John Michael Clancy (Democratic) 59.1%; ▌ William Erigena Robinson (Republican) 39.6%; ▌ Isaac K. Funk (Prohibition) 1.3%
New York 5	Archibald M. Bliss	Democratic	1884	Incumbent retired. Democratic hold.	▌ ✓ Thomas F. Magner (Democratic) 52.2%; ▌ Henry J. Hesse (Republican) 46.2%; ▌ Charles H. Colby (Prohibition) 1.6%
New York 6	Amos J. Cummings	Democratic	1886	Incumbent retired. Democratic hold.	▌ ✓ Frank T. Fitzgerald (Democratic/Union Labor) 55.8%; ▌ John Cavanaugh (Republican) 42.0%; ▌ George W. Myer (Prohibition) 1.8%; ▌ George Knight (Socialist Labor) 0.4%
New York 7	Lloyd Bryce	Democratic	1886	Incumbent lost re-election as a County Democratic candidate. Democratic hold.	▌ ✓ Edward J. Dunphy (Tammany Hall Democratic) 40.6%; ▌ Charles N. Taintor (Republican) 33.0%; ▌ Lloyd Bryce (County Democratic) 25.7%; ▌ Dean La Banta (Prohibition) 0.6%; ▌ Lehman Blynn (Socialist Labor) 0.1%
New York 8	Timothy J. Campbell	Democratic	1885	Incumbent lost re-election as a County Democratic candidate. Democratic hold.	▌ ✓ John H. McCarthy (Tammany Hall Democratic) 52.3%; ▌ Timothy J. Campbell (County Democratic) 34.5%; ▌ Julius Q. Schwartz (Republican) 12.2%; ▌ John Schaeffer (Socialist Labor) 0.9%; ▌ John C. Macauley (Prohibition) 0.1%
New York 9	Samuel S. Cox	Democratic	1886	Incumbent re-elected.	▌ ✓ Samuel S. Cox (Democratic/Union Labor) 68.3%; ▌ John McMackin (Republican) 27.4%; ▌ Christian Yaeger (Socialist Labor) 3.8%; ▌ Adam W. Wagnalls (Prohibition) 0.5%
New York 10	Francis B. Spinola	Democratic	1886	Incumbent re-elected.	▌ ✓ Francis B. Spinola (Democratic/Union Labor) 52.1%; ▌ William Boyhan (Republican) 45.5%; ▌ William A. Wilson (Prohibition) 1.7%; ▌ John Hauser (Socialist Labor) 0.7%
New York 11	Truman A. Merriman	Democratic	1884	Incumbent retired. Democratic hold.	▌ ✓ John Quinn (Democratic/Union Labor) 55.3%; ▌ Charles A. Winch (Republican) 43.0%; ▌ Edward Wolff (Socialist Labor) 1.2%; ▌ Michael J. Ryan (Prohibition) 0.5%
New York 12	William Bourke Cockran	Democratic	1886	Incumbent retired. Democratic hold.	▌ ✓ Roswell P. Flower (Democratic/Union Labor) 65.8%; ▌ David M. Hildreth, Jr. (Republican) 31.6%; ▌ John J. Flick (Socialist Labor) 2.2%; ▌ John L. Thomas (Prohibition) 0.4%
New York 13	Ashbel P. Fitch	Republican	1886	Incumbent re-elected as a Democratic candidate. Democratic gain.	▌ ✓ Ashbel P. Fitch (Democratic) 58.9%; ▌ James O. Hoyt (Republican) 40.0%; ▌ Herman Kuhn (Socialist Labor) 0.7%; ▌ Simeon W. Clapp (Prohibition) 0.4%
New York 14	William G. Stahlnecker	Democratic	1884	Incumbent re-elected.	▌ ✓ William G. Stahlnecker (Democratic/Union Labor) 53.7%; ▌ James Wood (Republican) 43.9%; ▌ Victor W. Benedict (Prohibition) 2.0%; ▌ Edward Goldsmith (Socialist Labor) 0.4%
New York 15	Henry Bacon	Democratic	1886	Incumbent lost re-election. Republican gain.	▌ ✓ Moses D. Stivers (Republican) 48.8%; ▌ Henry Bacon (Democratic/Union Labor) 48.6%; ▌ Thomas Coldwell (Prohibition) 2.6%
New York 16	John H. Ketcham	Republican	1876	Incumbent re-elected.	▌ ✓ John H. Ketcham (Republican) 74.6%; ▌ Mitchell Downing (Prohibition) 25.4%
New York 17	Stephen T. Hopkins	Republican	1886	Incumbent retired. Republican hold.	▌ ✓ Charles J. Knapp (Republican) 50.2%; ▌ Frank N. Gilbert (Democratic) 46.5%; ▌ Albert K. Smiley (Prohibition) 3.3%
New York 18	Edward W. Greenman	Democratic	1886	Incumbent retired. Republican gain.	▌ ✓ John A. Quackenbush (Republican) 53.4%; ▌ Samuel B. Sanford (Democratic) 44.6%; ▌ Thuman Temple (Prohibition) 2.0%
New York 19	Charles Tracey	Democratic	1887	Incumbent re-elected.	▌ ✓ Charles Tracey (Democratic) 52.3%; ▌ Moses W. Dodge (Republican) 46.6%; ▌ George Russell (Prohibition) 1.0%; ▌ August Kessler (Union Labor) 0.1%
New York 20	George West	Republican	1884	Incumbent retired. Republican hold.	▌ ✓ John Sanford (Republican) 52.2%; ▌ Zerah S. Westbrook (Democratic) 45.0%; ▌ William H. Place (Prohibition) 2.8%
New York 21	John H. Moffitt	Republican	1886	Incumbent re-elected.	▌ ✓ John H. Moffitt (Republican) 95.2%; ▌ Francis G. Crosby (Prohibition) 4.8%
New York 22	Abraham X. Parker	Republican	1880	Incumbent retired. Republican hold.	▌ ✓ Frederick Lansing (Republican) 62.0%; ▌ George C. Sawyer (Democratic) 34.7%; ▌ Walter R. Gray (Prohibition) 3.3%
New York 23	James S. Sherman	Republican	1886	Incumbent re-elected.	▌ ✓ James S. Sherman (Republican) 50.8%; ▌ John D. McMahon (Democratic) 46.4%; ▌ Solomon Hoxie (Prohibition) 2.8%
New York 24	David Wilber	Republican	1886	Incumbent re-elected.	▌ ✓ David Wilber (Republican) 50.2%; ▌ John S. Pindar (Democratic) 46.9%; ▌ Cornelius S. Johnson (Prohibition) 2.9%
New York 25	James J. Belden	Republican	1887	Incumbent re-elected.	▌ ✓ James J. Belden (Republican) 78.0%; ▌ Andrew N. Vanderbilt (Democratic) 21.2%; ▌ Charles Dohne (Prohibition) 0.8%
New York 26	Milton De Lano	Republican	1886	Incumbent re-elected.	▌ ✓ Milton De Lano (Republican) 55.4%; ▌ Patrick Maloney (Democratic) 40.0%; ▌ Truman E. Case (Prohibition) 4.6%
New York 27	Newton W. Nutting	Republican	1886	Incumbent re-elected.	▌ ✓ Newton W. Nutting (Republican) 58.6%; ▌ D. Sands Titus (Democratic) 37.3%; ▌ Homer E. Rheubottom (Prohibition) 4.1%
New York 28	Thomas S. Flood	Republican	1886	Incumbent re-elected.	▌ ✓ Thomas S. Flood (Republican) 50.3%; ▌ Adrian Tuttle (Democratic) 46.5%; ▌ Thomas Carman (Prohibition) 3.2%
New York 29	Ira Davenport	Republican	1884	Incumbent retired. Republican hold.	▌ ✓ John Raines (Republican) 53.6%; ▌ John W. Dininny (Democratic) 41.7%; ▌ William R. Hunt (Prohibition) 4.7%
New York 30	Charles S. Baker	Republican	1884	Incumbent re-elected.	▌ ✓ Charles S. Baker (Republican) 55.4%; ▌ Chauncey Nash (Democratic) 40.9%; ▌ John J. Cornell (Prohibition) 3.7%
New York 31	John G. Sawyer	Republican	1884	Incumbent re-elected.	▌ ✓ John G. Sawyer (Republican) 54.4%; ▌ Frederick C. Stevens (Democratic) 39.3%; ▌ Eugene E. Barnum (Prohibition) 6.4%
New York 32	John McCreath Farquhar	Republican	1884	Incumbent re-elected.	▌ ✓ John McCreath Farquhar (Republican) 51.6%; ▌ William F. Mackey (Democratic) 47.9%; ▌ Joseph W. Grosvenor (Prohibition) 0.5%
New York 33	John B. Weber	Republican	1884	Incumbent lost renomination. Democratic gain.	▌ ✓ John M. Wiley (Democratic) 48.8%; ▌ Richard Crowley (Republican) 47.0%; ▌ George T. Chester (Prohibition) 4.2%
New York 34	William G. Laidlaw	Republican	1886	Incumbent re-elected.	▌ ✓ William G. Laidlaw (Republican) 58.9%; ▌ Charles F. Howe (Democratic) 33.3%; ▌ Medad S. Corey (Prohibition) 6.8%; ▌ Simeon C. Davis (Union Labor) 1.0%

== North Carolina ==
District	Incumbent			This race	
District	Member	Party	First elected	Results	Candidates
North Carolina 1	Louis C. Latham	Democratic	1886	Incumbent lost renomination. Democratic hold.	▌ ✓ Thomas Gregory Skinner (Democratic) 51.4%; ▌ Elihu A. White (Republican) 47.8%; ▌ Decatur W. Jarvis (Prohibition) 0.8%
North Carolina 2	F. M. Simmons	Democratic	1886	Incumbent lost re-election. Republican gain.	▌ ✓ Henry P. Cheatham (Republican) 51.0%; ▌ F. M. Simmons (Democratic) 49.0%
North Carolina 3	Charles W. McClammy	Democratic	1886	Incumbent re-elected.	▌ ✓ Charles W. McClammy (Democratic) 56.7%; ▌ William Robinson (Republican) 43.3%
North Carolina 4	John Nichols	Independent	1886	Incumbent lost re-election as a Republican candidate. Democratic gain.	▌ ✓ Benjamin H. Bunn (Democratic) 53.4%; ▌ John Nichols (Republican) 46.6%
North Carolina 5	John M. Brower	Republican	1886	Incumbent re-elected.	▌ ✓ John M. Brower (Republican) 50.4%; ▌ James T. Morehead (Democratic) 48.2%
North Carolina 6	Alfred Rowland	Democratic	1886	Incumbent re-elected.	▌ ✓ Alfred Rowland (Democratic) 58.1%; ▌ Caleb P. Lockey (Republican) 41.9%
North Carolina 7	John S. Henderson	Democratic	1884	Incumbent re-elected.	▌ ✓ John S. Henderson (Democratic) 54.3%; ▌ William J. Ellis (Republican) 43.5%; ▌ C. P. Frazier (Prohibition) 2.2%
North Carolina 8	William H. H. Cowles	Democratic	1884	Incumbent re-elected.	▌ ✓ William H. H. Cowles (Democratic) 56.7%; ▌ Edward W. Ward (Republican) 43.3%
North Carolina 9	Thomas D. Johnston	Democratic	1884	Incumbent lost re-election. Republican gain.	▌ ✓ Hamilton G. Ewart (Republican) 50.9%; ▌ Thomas D. Johnston (Democratic) 49.2%

== Ohio ==
District	Incumbent			This race	
District	Member	Party	First elected	Results	Candidates
Ohio 1	Benjamin Butterworth	Republican	1884	Incumbent re-elected.	▌ ✓ Benjamin Butterworth (Republican) 51.9%; ▌Otway Cosgrove (Democratic) 46.8%; ▌Thomas T. Markland (Labor) 0.8%; ▌Henry T. Ogden (Prohibition) 0.6%
Ohio 2	Charles Elwood Brown	Republican	1884	Incumbent retired. Republican hold.	▌ ✓ John A. Caldwell (Republican) 51.0%; ▌Clinton W. Gerard (Democratic) 47.2%; ▌W. H. Stephenson (Labor) 1.4%; ▌Leonidas E. Brown (Prohibition) 0.4%
Ohio 3	Elihu S. Williams	Republican	1886	Incumbent re-elected.	▌ ✓ Elihu S. Williams (Republican) 49.2%; ▌George W. Houk (Democratic) 48.2%; ▌Thomas G. Williams (Prohibition) 2.6%
Ohio 4	Samuel S. Yoder	Democratic	1886	Incumbent re-elected.	▌ ✓ Samuel S. Yoder (Democratic) 58.9%; ▌Robert L. Mattingly (Republican) 38.3%; ▌William R. Sueman (Prohibition) 2.6%; ▌Moses Townsend (Labor) 0.2%
Ohio 5	George E. Seney	Democratic	1886	Incumbent re-elected.	▌ ✓ George E. Seney (Democratic) 56.1%; ▌Wilson Vance (Republican) 40.9%; ▌Christopher C. Nestlerode (Prohibition) 2.7%; ▌William H. Patterson (Labor) 0.3%
Ohio 6	Melvin M. Boothman	Republican	1886	Incumbent re-elected.	▌ ✓ Melvin M. Boothman (Republican) 48.4%; ▌Gaylord M. Saltzgaber (Democratic) 48.2%; ▌Alonzo B. Leonard (Prohibition) 3.0%; ▌James M. Barbour (Labor) 0.3%
Ohio 7	James E. Campbell	Democratic	1886	Incumbent retired. Republican gain.	▌ ✓ Henry Lee Morey (Republican) 49.9%; ▌John M. Pattison (Democratic) 47.5%; ▌Mighill Dustin (Prohibition) 2.5%; ▌James H. Gardiner (Labor) 0.2%
Ohio 8	Robert P. Kennedy	Republican	1886	Incumbent re-elected.	▌ ✓ Robert P. Kennedy (Republican) 51.8%; ▌Andrew R. Bohn (Democratic) 43.7%; ▌Frank S. Fuson (Prohibition) 4.5%
Ohio 9	William C. Cooper	Republican	1884	Incumbent re-elected.	▌ ✓ William C. Cooper (Republican) 50.7%; ▌John S. Braddock (Republican) 44.9%; ▌Joseph McFarland (Prohibition) 4.3%; ▌Abram Conklin (Labor) 0.1%
Ohio 10	Jacob Romeis	Republican	1884	Incumbent lost re-election. Democratic gain.	▌ ✓ William E. Haynes (Democratic) 50.7%; ▌Jacob Romeis (Republican) 47.8%; ▌William Nicholson (Prohibition) 1.3%; ▌Martin H. Darrow (Labor) 0.2%
Ohio 11	Albert C. Thompson	Republican	1886	Incumbent re-elected.	▌ ✓ Albert C. Thompson (Republican) 55.6%; ▌Joseph W. Shinn (Democratic) 42.3%; ▌Jonathan Morris (Prohibition) 2.1%
Ohio 12	Jacob J. Pugsley	Republican	1886	Incumbent re-elected.	▌ ✓ Jacob J. Pugsley (Republican) 49.6%; ▌Lawrence T. Neal (Democratic) 47.9%; ▌Almon E. Clevenger (Prohibition) 2.5%
Ohio 13	Joseph H. Outhwaite	Democratic	1884	Incumbent re-elected.	▌ ✓ Joseph H. Outhwaite (Democratic) 51.4%; ▌John B. Neil (Republican) 46.1%; ▌John Aikin (Prohibition) 1.8%; ▌Charles C. Pomeroy (Labor) 0.3%; ▌Allen S. Felch (Independent) 0.3%
Ohio 14	Charles P. Wickham	Republican	1886	Incumbent re-elected.	▌ ✓ Charles P. Wickham (Republican) 49.5%; ▌David L. Wadsworth (Democratic) 46.6%; ▌George W. Walker (Prohibition) 3.9%
Ohio 15	Charles H. Grosvenor	Republican	1886	Incumbent re-elected.	▌ ✓ Charles H. Grosvenor (Republican) 51.9%; ▌John P. Spriggs (Democratic) 45.1%; ▌Malcolm Roberts (Prohibition) 3.0%
Ohio 16	Beriah Wilkins	Democratic	1886	Incumbent retired. Democratic hold.	▌ ✓ James W. Owens (Democratic) 53.8%; ▌Edwin L. Lybarger (Republican) 43.6%; ▌James M. Scott (Prohibition) 2.5%; ▌Stephen R. Crumbaker (Labor) 0.1%
Ohio 17	Joseph D. Taylor	Republican	1886	Incumbent re-elected.	▌ ✓ Joseph D. Taylor (Republican) 54.4%; ▌William Lawrence (Democratic) 42.1%; ▌Thorton A. Rodifer (Prohibition) 4.4%
Ohio 18	William McKinley	Republican	1886	Incumbent re-elected.	▌ ✓ William McKinley (Republican) 52.3%; ▌George P. Ikirt (Democratic) 43.8%; ▌Lambelis B. Logan (Prohibition) 3.1%; ▌George W. Thornburg (Labor) 0.7%; ▌Elijah Little (Independent) 0.1%
Ohio 19	Ezra B. Taylor	Republican	1880 (s)	Incumbent re-elected.	▌ ✓ Ezra B. Taylor (Republican) 63.5%; ▌Henry Apthorp (Democratic) 30.6%; ▌William H. Dana (Prohibition) 5.5%; ▌David D. Marvin (Labor) 0.4%
Ohio 20	George W. Crouse	Republican	1886	Incumbent retired. Republican hold.	▌ ✓ Martin L. Smyser (Republican) 50.6%; ▌Calvin P. Humphrey (Democratic) 45.1%; ▌John D. Jones (Prohibition) 3.8%; ▌Louis F. Renner (Labor) 0.5%
Ohio 21	Martin A. Foran	Democratic	1882	Incumbent retired. Republican gain.	▌ ✓ Theodore E. Burton (Republican) 49.8%; ▌Tom L. Johnson (Democratic) 48.3%; ▌Edmund G. Vail (Labor) 1.0%; ▌Elisha S. Loomis (Prohibition) 0.9%

== Oregon ==
District	Incumbent			This race	
District	Member	Party	First elected	Results	Candidates
Oregon at-large	Binger Hermann	Republican	1884	Incumbent re-elected.	▌ ✓ Binger Hermann (Republican) 54.5%; ▌ John M. Gearin (Democratic) 42.2%; ▌ G.M. Miller (Prohibition) 3.3%

== Pennsylvania ==
District	Incumbent			This race	
District	Member	Party	First elected	Results	Candidates
Pennsylvania 1	Henry H. Bingham	Republican	1878	Incumbent re-elected.	▌ ✓ Henry H. Bingham (Republican) 57.1%; ▌ Edwin G. Flanagan (Democratic) 42.7%; ▌ Horace W. Eastlack (Prohibition) 0.2%
Pennsylvania 2	Charles O'Neill	Republican	1872	Incumbent re-elected.	▌ ✓ Charles O'Neill (Republican) 57.2%; ▌ D. Webster Dougherty (Democratic) 42.2%; ▌ John B. Jones (Prohibition) 0.6%
Pennsylvania 3	Samuel J. Randall	Democratic	1862	Incumbent re-elected.	▌ ✓ Samuel J. Randall (Democratic) 99.4%
Pennsylvania 4	William D. Kelley	Republican	1860	Incumbent re-elected.	▌ ✓ William D. Kelley (Republican) 58.1%; ▌ William M. Ayres (Democratic) 41.1%; ▌ D. Jones (Labor) 0.8%
Pennsylvania 5	Alfred C. Harmer	Republican	1876	Incumbent re-elected.	▌ ✓ Alfred C. Harmer (Republican) 56.2%; ▌ F. A. Herwig (Democratic) 43.4%; ▌ Charles P. Whittcar (Prohibition) 0.4%
Pennsylvania 6	Smedley Darlington	Republican	1886	Incumbent re-elected.	▌ ✓ Smedley Darlington (Republican) 58.1%; ▌ Samuel Greenwood (Democratic) 38.5%; ▌ George Drayton (Prohibition) 3.4%
Pennsylvania 7	Robert M. Yardley	Republican	1886	Incumbent re-elected.	▌ ✓ Robert M. Yardley (Republican) 50.7%; ▌ George Ross (Democratic) 48.4%; ▌ Thomas P. Mutchler (Prohibition) 0.9%
Pennsylvania 8	None (New district)			New district. Democratic gain.	▌ ✓ William Mutchler (Democratic) 59.8%; ▌ Frank Reeder (Republican) 38.8%; ▌ Simeon B. Chase (Prohibition) 1.4%
Pennsylvania 9	Daniel Ermentrout; Redistricted from the 8th district	Democratic	1880	Incumbent lost renomination. Democratic hold.	▌ ✓ David B. Brunner (Democratic) 60.3%; ▌ James S. Biery (Republican) 38.8%; ▌ William H. Stauffer (Prohibition) 0.9%
Pennsylvania 9	William H. Sowden; Redistricted from the 10th district	Democratic	1884	Incumbent retired. Democratic loss.	▌ ✓ David B. Brunner (Democratic) 60.3%; ▌ James S. Biery (Republican) 38.8%; ▌ William H. Stauffer (Prohibition) 0.9%
Pennsylvania 10	John A. Hiestand; Redistricted from the 9th district	Republican	1884	Incumbent lost renomination. Republican hold.	▌ ✓ Marriott Brosius (Republican) 66.4%; ▌ Horace L. Haldeman (Democratic) 32.4%; ▌ Ezra Reist (Prohibition) 1.2%
Pennsylvania 11	None (New district)			New district. Republican gain.	▌ ✓ Joseph A. Scranton (Republican) 51.1%; ▌ Francis D. Collins (Democratic) 43.2%; ▌ William W. Lathrope (Prohibition) 5.7%
Pennsylvania 12	Edwin S. Osborne; Redistricted from the at-large district	Republican	1884	Incumbent re-elected.	▌ ✓ Edwin S. Osborne (Republican) 51.3%; ▌ John Lynch (Democratic) 46.5%; ▌ Henry W. Evans (Prohibition) 2.2%
Pennsylvania 12	John Lynch	Democratic	1886	Incumbent lost re-election. Democratic loss.	▌ ✓ Edwin S. Osborne (Republican) 51.3%; ▌ John Lynch (Democratic) 46.5%; ▌ Henry W. Evans (Prohibition) 2.2%
Pennsylvania 13	Charles N. Brumm	Republican	1880	Incumbent lost re-election. Democratic gain.	▌ ✓ James B. Reilly (Democratic) 51.0%; ▌ Charles N. Brumm (Republican/Greenback) 48.4%; ▌ S. G. M. Hollopeter (Prohibition) 0.6%
Pennsylvania 14	None (New district)			New district. Republican gain.	▌ ✓ John W. Rife (Republican) 58.3%; ▌ Abraham Bower (Democratic) 40.3%; ▌ J. Henry Spicer (Prohibition) 1.4%
Pennsylvania 15	Frank C. Bunnell	Republican	1884	Incumbent retired. Republican hold.	▌ ✓ Myron B. Wright (Republican) 56.8%; ▌ Thomas J. Ham (Democratic) 37.7%; ▌ David K. Brown (Prohibition) 5.5%
Pennsylvania 16	Henry C. McCormick	Republican	1886	Incumbent re-elected.	▌ ✓ Henry C. McCormick (Republican) 54.2%; ▌ Charles T. Steck (Democratic) 43.9%; ▌ Charles C. Schaeffle (Prohibition) 1.9%
Pennsylvania 17	Charles R. Buckalew; Redistricted from the 11th district	Democratic	1886	Incumbent re-elected.	▌ ✓ Charles R. Buckalew (Democratic) 54.5%; ▌ David B. Robinson (Republican) 44.2%; ▌ D. C. Kaseman (Prohibition) 1.3%
Pennsylvania 17	Franklin Bound; Redistricted from the 14th district	Republican	1884	Incumbent retired. Republican loss.	▌ ✓ Charles R. Buckalew (Democratic) 54.5%; ▌ David B. Robinson (Republican) 44.2%; ▌ D. C. Kaseman (Prohibition) 1.3%
Pennsylvania 18	Louis E. Atkinson	Republican	1882	Incumbent re-elected.	▌ ✓ Louis E. Atkinson (Republican) 56.2%; ▌ B. McWilliams (Democratic) 43.3%; ▌ William G. Reed (Prohibition) 0.5%
Pennsylvania 19	Levi Maish	Democratic	1886	Incumbent re-elected.	▌ ✓ Levi Maish (Democratic) 55.1%; ▌ Hiram Young (Republican) 43.4%; ▌ Edward E. Knauss (Prohibition) 1.6%
Pennsylvania 20	Edward Scull; Redistricted from the 17th district	Republican	1886	Incumbent re-elected.	▌ ✓ Edward Scull (Republican) 54.3%; ▌ Thomas H. Greevy (Democratic) 43.6%; ▌ Urias M. Beachley (Prohibition) 2.1%
Pennsylvania 21	Welty McCullogh	Republican	1886	Incumbent lost renomination. Republican hold.	▌ ✓ Samuel Alfred Craig (Republican) 54.0%; ▌ Henry L. Donnelly (Democratic) 42.3%; ▌ Thomas St. Clair (Greenback) 1.9%; ▌ B. H. Vankirk (Prohibition) 1.8%
Pennsylvania 22	John Dalzell	Republican	1886	Incumbent re-elected.	▌ ✓ John Dalzell (Republican) 62.0%; ▌ Robert B. Parkinson (Democratic) 36.9%; ▌ William B. Brickell (Prohibition) 1.1%
Pennsylvania 23	Thomas M. Bayne	Republican	1876	Incumbent re-elected.	▌ ✓ Thomas M. Bayne (Republican) 66.8%; ▌ Joseph A. Langfitt (Democratic) 32.0%; ▌ W. A. Holman (Prohibition) 1.2%
Pennsylvania 24	None (New district)			New district. Republican gain.	▌ ✓ Joseph W. Ray (Republican) 53.2%; ▌ William P. Wampler (Democratic) 44.4%; ▌ Louis W. Morgan (Prohibition) 2.4%
Pennsylvania 25	Oscar L. Jackson; Redistricted from the 24th district	Republican	1884	Incumbent lost renomination. Republican hold.	▌ ✓ Charles C. Townsend (Republican) 56.5%; ▌ Samuel B. Griffith (Democratic) 37.8%; ▌ William T. May (Prohibition) 4.2%
Pennsylvania 25	Norman Hall; Redistricted from the 26th district	Democratic	1886	Incumbent retired. Democratic loss.	▌ ✓ Charles C. Townsend (Republican) 56.5%; ▌ Samuel B. Griffith (Democratic) 37.8%; ▌ William T. May (Prohibition) 4.2%
Pennsylvania 26	William Lawrence Scott; Redistricted from the 27th district	Democratic	1884	Incumbent declined renomination. Republican gain.	▌ ✓ William C. Culbertson (Republican) 52.5%; ▌ James R. Burnes (Democratic) 43.0%; ▌ R. Miller (Prohibition) 1.9%
Pennsylvania 27	None (New district)			New district. Republican gain.	▌ ✓ Lewis F. Watson (Republican) 53.2%; ▌ William A. Rankin (Democratic) 36.7%; ▌ Charles Miller (Prohibition) 6.5%; ▌ J. Whiteley (Greenback) 3.6%
Pennsylvania 28	John Patton; Redistricted from the 20th district	Republican	1886	Incumbent retired. Democratic gain.	▌ ✓ James Kerr (Democratic) 53.5%; ▌ Theodore P. Rynder (Republican) 45.3%; ▌ John S. McCreery (Prohibition) 1.3%
Pennsylvania 28	James T. Maffett; Redistricted from the 25th district	Republican	1886	Incumbent lost renomination. Republican loss.	▌ ✓ James Kerr (Democratic) 53.5%; ▌ Theodore P. Rynder (Republican) 45.3%; ▌ John S. McCreery (Prohibition) 1.3%

== Rhode Island ==
District	Incumbent			This race	
District	Member	Party	First elected	Results	Candidates
Rhode Island 1	Henry J. Spooner	Republican	1881	Incumbent re-elected.	▌ ✓ Henry J. Spooner (Republican) 53.3%; ▌ Oscar Lapham (Democratic) 43.3%; ▌ Elwood G. Macomber (Prohibition) 3.4%
Rhode Island 2	Warren O. Arnold	Republican	1886	Incumbent re-elected.	▌ ✓ Warren O. Arnold (Republican) 55.9%; ▌ William C. Baker (Democratic) 41.1%; ▌ Anson Greene (Prohibition) 2.9%

== South Carolina ==
District	Incumbent			This race	
District	Member	Party	First elected	Results	Candidates
South Carolina 1	Samuel Dibble	Democratic	1882	Incumbent re-elected.	▌ ✓ Samuel Dibble (Democratic) 86.7%; ▌S. W. McKinlay (Republican) 13.1%; Others 0.2%
South Carolina 2	George D. Tillman	Democratic	1878	Incumbent re-elected.	▌ ✓ George D. Tillman (Democratic) 86.8%; ▌Seymour E. Smith (Republican) 11.4%; Others 1.8%
South Carolina 3	James S. Cothran	Democratic	1886	Incumbent re-elected.	▌ ✓ James S. Cothran (Democratic) 99.8%; Others 0.2%
South Carolina 4	William H. Perry	Democratic	1884	Incumbent re-elected.	▌ ✓ William H. Perry (Democratic) 99.9%; Others 0.1%
South Carolina 5	John J. Hemphill	Democratic	1882	Incumbent re-elected.	▌ ✓ John J. Hemphill (Democratic) 99.7%; Others 0.3%
South Carolina 6	George W. Dargan	Democratic	1882	Incumbent re-elected.	▌ ✓ George W. Dargan (Democratic) 95.7%; Others 4.3%
South Carolina 7	William Elliott	Democratic	1884	Incumbent re-elected.	▌ ✓ William Elliott (Democratic) 54.1%; ▌Thomas E. Miller (Republican) 45.4%; Others 0.5%

In the 7th district, Elliott was initially declared re-elected, but Miller successfully challenged the election and was seated in his place in September 1890.

== Tennessee ==
District	Incumbent			This race	
District	Member	Party	First elected	Results	Candidates
Tennessee 1	Roderick R. Butler	Republican	1886	Incumbent retired. Republican hold.	▌ ✓ Alfred A. Taylor (Republican) 60.33%; ▌David P. Wilcox (Democratic) 38.20%; ▌James M. Pierce (Prohibition) 1.47%
Tennessee 2	Leonidas C. Houk	Republican	1878	Incumbent re-elected.	▌ ✓ Leonidas C. Houk (Republican) 68.80%; ▌Samuel G. Heiskell (Democratic) 28.98%; ▌James A. Ruble (Prohibition) 2.22%
Tennessee 3	John R. Neal	Democratic	1884	Incumbent retired. Republican gain.	▌ ✓ Henry C. Evans (Republican) 49.99%; ▌Creed F. Bates (Democratic) 49.22%; ▌M. D. Cone (Prohibition) 0.79%
Tennessee 4	Benton McMillin	Democratic	1878	Incumbent re-elected.	▌ ✓ Benton McMillin (Democratic) 61.62%; ▌Jonathan S. Wooten (Republican) 38.38%
Tennessee 5	James D. Richardson	Democratic	1884	Incumbent re-elected.	▌ ✓ James D. Richardson (Democratic) 67.82%; ▌C. H. Shoffner (Republican) 32.19%
Tennessee 6	Joseph E. Washington	Democratic	1886	Incumbent re-elected.	▌ ✓ Joseph E. Washington (Democratic) 57.20%; ▌William H. Young (Republican) 38.26%; ▌Louis G. Mumford (Prohibition) 4.54%
Tennessee 7	Washington C. Whitthorne	Democratic	1886	Incumbent re-elected.	▌ ✓ Washington C. Whitthorne (Democratic) 57.75%; ▌Robert A. Haggard (Republican) 42.25%
Tennessee 8	Benjamin A. Enloe	Democratic	1886	Incumbent re-elected.	▌ ✓ Benjamin A. Enloe (Democratic) 54.72%; ▌Warren Smith (Republican) 45.28%
Tennessee 9	Presley T. Glass	Democratic	1884	Incumbent lost renomination. Democratic hold.	▌ ✓ Rice A. Pierce (Democratic) 62.96%; ▌J. W. Brown (Republican) 37.04%
Tennessee 10	James Phelan Jr.	Democratic	1886	Incumbent re-elected.	▌ ✓ James Phelan Jr. (Democratic) 63.21%; ▌L. B. Eaton (Republican) 36.80%

== Texas ==
District	Incumbent			This race	
District	Member	Party	First elected	Results	Candidates
Texas 1	Charles Stewart	Democratic	1882	Incumbent re-elected.	▌ ✓ Charles Stewart (Democratic) 49.8%; ▌ Lock McDaniel (Republican) 36.8%; ▌ Jack Davis (Prohibition) 13.1%
Texas 2	William Harrison Martin	Democratic	1887	Incumbent re-elected.	▌ ✓ William Harrison Martin (Democratic) 70.9%; ▌ R. M. Humphries (Union Labor) 29.1%
Texas 3	Constantine B. Kilgore	Democratic	1886	Incumbent re-elected.	▌ ✓ Constantine B. Kilgore (Democratic) 68.0%; ▌ William E. Farmer (Union Labor/Republican) 32.0%
Texas 4	David B. Culberson	Democratic	1874	Incumbent re-elected.	▌ ✓ David B. Culberson (Democratic) 99.9%
Texas 5	Silas Hare	Democratic	1886	Incumbent re-elected.	▌ ✓ Silas Hare (Democratic) 85.0%; ▌ J. W. Thomas (Republican) 14.1%
Texas 6	Jo Abbott	Democratic	1886	Incumbent re-elected.	▌ ✓ Jo Abbott (Democratic) 68.9%; ▌ Sam Evans (Union Labor) 31.1%
Texas 7	William H. Crain	Democratic	1884	Incumbent re-elected.	▌ ✓ William H. Crain (Democratic) 56.4%; ▌ Calvin G. Brewster (Republican) 43.6%
Texas 8	Littleton W. Moore	Democratic	1886	Incumbent re-elected.	▌ ✓ Littleton W. Moore (Democratic) 69.3%; ▌ T. C. Cook (Republican) 27.9%; ▌ R. H. Sledge (Union Labor) 2.8%
Texas 9	Roger Q. Mills	Democratic	1872	Incumbent re-elected.	▌ ✓ Roger Q. Mills (Democratic) 57.5%; ▌ Evan A. Jones (Independent Fusion) 42.5%
Texas 10	Joseph D. Sayers	Democratic	1884	Incumbent re-elected.	▌ ✓ Joseph D. Sayers (Democratic) 66.3%; ▌ Augustus Belknap (Republican) 33.7%
Texas 11	S. W. T. Lanham	Democratic	1882	Incumbent re-elected.	▌ ✓ S. W. T. Lanham (Democratic) 85.9%; ▌ D. M. Rumph (Union Labor) 10.2%; ▌ David Redfield (Republican) 3.8%

== Utah Territory ==
See Non-voting delegates, below.

== Vermont ==
District	Incumbent			This race	
District	Member	Party	First elected	Results	Candidates
Vermont 1	John W. Stewart	Republican	1882	Incumbent re-elected.	▌ ✓ John W. Stewart (Republican) 70.2%; ▌Azro Meacham (Democratic) 28.6%; ▌Peter Dakin (Prohibition) 1.1%
Vermont 2	William W. Grout	Republican	1880; 1882 (lost); 1884	Incumbent re-elected.	▌ ✓ William W. Grout (Republican) 71.2%; ▌George W. Smith (Democratic) 27.6%; ▌Cyrus W. Wyman (Prohibition) 1.2%

== Virginia ==
District	Incumbent			This race	
District	Member	Party	First elected	Results	Candidates
Virginia 1	Thomas H. B. Browne	Republican	1886	Incumbent re-elected.	▌ ✓ Thomas H. B. Browne (Republican) 50.7%; ▌Gilmer S. Kendall (Democratic) 49.3%
Virginia 2	George E. Bowden	Republican	1886	Incumbent re-elected.	▌ ✓ George E. Bowden (Republican) 58.7%; ▌Richard C. Marshall (Democratic) 40.6%; ▌Andrew Williams (Republican) 0.7%
Virginia 3	George D. Wise	Democratic	1880	Incumbent re-elected.	▌ ✓ George D. Wise (Democratic) 50.4%; ▌Edmund Waddill Jr. (Republican) 49.6%
Virginia 4	William E. Gaines	Republican	1886	Incumbent retired. Republican hold.	▌ ✓ John M. Langston (Republican) 45.6%; ▌Edward C. Venable (Democratic) 43.1%; ▌R. W. Arnold (Republican) 11.3%
Virginia 5	John Robert Brown	Republican	1886	Incumbent retired. Democratic gain.	▌ ✓ Posey G. Lester (Democratic) 52.5%; ▌John Blackwell (Republican) 47.5%
Virginia 6	Samuel I. Hopkins	Labor	1886	Incumbent retired. Democratic gain.	▌ ✓ Paul C. Edmunds (Democratic) 55.6%; ▌Patrick H. Caull (Republican) 43.8%; ▌Samuel T. Hopkins (Democratic) 0.6%
Virginia 7	Charles T. O'Ferrall	Democratic	1882 (contest)	Incumbent re-elected.	▌ ✓ Charles T. O'Ferrall (Democratic) 54.3%; ▌John E. Roller (Republican) 45.0%; ▌John C. Rivercombe (Prohibition) 0.7%
Virginia 8	W. H. F. Lee	Democratic	1886	Incumbent re-elected.	▌ ✓ W. H. F. Lee (Democratic) 51.8%; ▌Park Agnew (Republican) 48.0%; ▌Daniel J. Hoge (Independent) 0.2%
Virginia 9	Henry Bowen	Republican	1886	Incumbent lost re-election. Democratic gain.	▌ ✓ John A. Buchanan (Democratic) 50.7%; ▌Henry Bowen (Republican) 49.3%
Virginia 10	Jacob Yost	Republican	1886	Incumbent lost re-election. Democratic gain.	▌ ✓ Henry St. George Tucker III (Democratic) 51.0%; ▌Jacob Yost (Republican) 49.0%

== Washington Territory ==
See Non-voting delegates, below.

== West Virginia ==
District	Incumbent			This race	
District	Member	Party	First elected	Results	Candidates
West Virginia 1	Nathan Goff Jr.	Republican	1882	Incumbent retired. Democratic gain.	▌ ✓ John O. Pendleton (Democratic) 49.55%; ▌George W. Atkinson (Republican) 49.49%; Others: ▌B. F. Meyers (Prohibition) 0.54%; ▌John E. Stealey (Independent) 0.43%
West Virginia 1	Nathan Goff Jr.	Republican	1882	Election successfully contested. New member seated February 26, 1890. Republican hold.	▌ ✓ George W. Atkinson (Republican) 50.06%; ▌John O. Pendleton (Democratic) 49.94%
West Virginia 2	William L. Wilson	Democratic	1882	Incumbent re-elected.	▌ ✓ William L. Wilson (Democratic) 50.11%; ▌W. H. Flick (Republican) 49.19%; Others: ▌Frank Burt (Prohibition) 0.46%; ▌S. W. Sturm (Labor) 0.24%
West Virginia 3	Charles P. Snyder	Democratic	1883 (special)	Incumbent retired. Democratic hold.	▌ ✓ John D. Alderson (Democratic) 50.51%; ▌James H. McGinnis (Republican) 46.44%; ▌W. D. Sanford (Independent) 2.24%; ▌C. W. Henson (Prohibition) 0.80%
West Virginia 4	Charles E. Hogg	Democratic	1886	Incumbent lost renomination. Democratic hold.	▌ ✓ James M. Jackson (Democratic) 49.65%; ▌Charles B. Smith (Republican) 49.64%; Others: ▌W. M. Weekley (Independent) 0.56%; ▌G. W. Hays (Independent) 0.15%
West Virginia 4	Charles E. Hogg	Democratic	1886	Election successfully contested. New member seated February 3, 1890. Republican gain.	▌ ✓ James M. Jackson (Democratic) 49.65%; ▌Charles B. Smith (Republican) 49.64%; Others: ▌W. M. Weekley (Independent) 0.56%; ▌G. W. Hays (Independent) 0.15%

== Wisconsin ==
Wisconsin elected nine members of congress on Election Day, November 6, 1888.

District	Incumbent			This race	
District	Member	Party	First elected	Results	Candidates
Wisconsin 1	Lucien B. Caswell	Republican	1884	Incumbent re-elected.	▌ ✓ Lucien B. Caswell (Republican) 53.4%; ▌Joseph Doe (Democratic) 41.5%; ▌Stephen Faville (Prohibition) 5.0%
Wisconsin 2	Richard W. Guenther	Republican	1886	Incumbent declined re-nomination. Democratic gain.	▌ ✓ Charles Barwig (Democratic) 53.2%; ▌Edward C. McFetridge (Republican) 43.8%; ▌O. H. Crowl (Prohibition) 2.6%; ▌Clark Hewitt (Labor) 0.3%
Wisconsin 3	Robert M. La Follette	Republican	1884	Incumbent re-elected.	▌ ✓ Robert M. La Follette (Republican) 50.0%; ▌John B. Parkinson (Democratic) 42.3%; ▌Thomas C. Richmond (Prohibition) 7.0%; ▌C. D. Wooster (Labor) 0.8%
Wisconsin 4	Henry Smith	Union Labor	1886	Incumbent lost re-election. Republican gain.	▌ ✓ Isaac W. Van Schaick (Republican) 50.8%; ▌Henry Smith (Dem.-Labor) 47.3%; Others: ▌John Schuler (Socialist) 1.2%; ▌George M. Heckendorn (Prohibition) 0.7%
Wisconsin 5	Thomas R. Hudd	Democratic	1886 (special)	Incumbent lost re-nomination. Democratic hold.	▌ ✓ George H. Brickner (Democratic) 55.2%; ▌Gustav Küstermann (Republican) 41.5%; ▌Charles Hatch (Labor) 2.8%; ▌E. M. Dick (Prohibition) 0.6%
Wisconsin 6	Charles B. Clark	Republican	1886	Incumbent re-elected.	▌ ✓ Charles B. Clark (Republican) 52.5%; ▌Charles W. Felger (Democratic) 41.5%; ▌W. S. Sweet (Prohibition) 3.6%; ▌Peter A. Griffith (Labor) 2.4%
Wisconsin 7	Ormsby B. Thomas	Republican	1884	Incumbent re-elected.	▌ ✓ Ormsby B. Thomas (Republican) 53.5%; ▌Frank P. Coburn (Democratic) 41.5%; ▌J. H. Mosely (Prohibition) 5.0%
Wisconsin 8	Nils P. Haugen	Republican	1887	Incumbent re-elected.	▌ ✓ Nils P. Haugen (Republican) 57.0%; ▌Samuel C. Johnson (Dem.-Labor) 34.9%; ▌Charles Alexander (Prohibition) 7.8%; ▌Dan C. Johnson (Write-in) 0.2%
Wisconsin 9	Isaac Stephenson	Republican	1882	Incumbent declined re-nomination. Republican hold.	▌ ✓ Myron H. McCord (Republican) 50.5%; ▌H. W. Early (Democratic) 45.4%; ▌A. C. Merryman (Prohibition) 2.7%; Others: ▌John F. Moore (Labor) 1.1%; ▌F. H. Moore (Write-in) 0.2%

== Wyoming Territory ==
See Non-voting delegates, below.

== Non-voting delegates ==
District	Incumbent			This race	
District	Delegate	Party	First elected	Results	Candidates
Arizona Territory at-large
Idaho Territory at-large	Fred Dubois	Republican	1886	Incumbent re-elected.	▌ ✓ Fred Dubois (Republican) 51.03%; ▌James H. Hawley (Democratic) 39.89%; ▌Norman Buck (North Idaho Annexation) 9.08%
Montana Territory at-large	Joseph K. Toole	Democratic	1884	Incumbent retired. Republican gain.	▌ ✓ Thomas H. Carter (Republican) 56.20%; ▌William A. Clark (Democratic) 43.39%
New Mexico Territory at-large
Utah Territory at-large
Washington Territory at-large
Wyoming Territory at-large	Joseph M. Carey	Republican	1884	Incumbent re-elected.	▌ ✓ Joseph M. Carey (Republican) 58.04%; ▌Caleb P. Organ (Democratic) 41.97%

== See also ==
- 1888 United States elections
  - 1888 United States presidential election
  - 1888–89 United States Senate elections
- 50th United States Congress
- 51st United States Congress

== Bibliography ==
- Dubin, Michael J. (March 1, 1998). United States Congressional Elections, 1788-1997: The Official Results of the Elections of the 1st Through 105th Congresses. McFarland and Company. ISBN 978-0786402830.
- Martis, Kenneth C. (January 1, 1989). The Historical Atlas of Political Parties in the United States Congress, 1789-1989. Macmillan Publishing Company. ISBN 978-0029201701.
- Moore, John L., ed. (1994). Congressional Quarterly's Guide to U.S. Elections (Third ed.). Congressional Quarterly Inc. ISBN 978-0871879967.
- "Party Divisions of the House of Representatives* 1789–Present". Office of the Historian, House of United States House of Representatives.
