= Daniel W. Connolly =

American politician

Daniel Ward Connolly
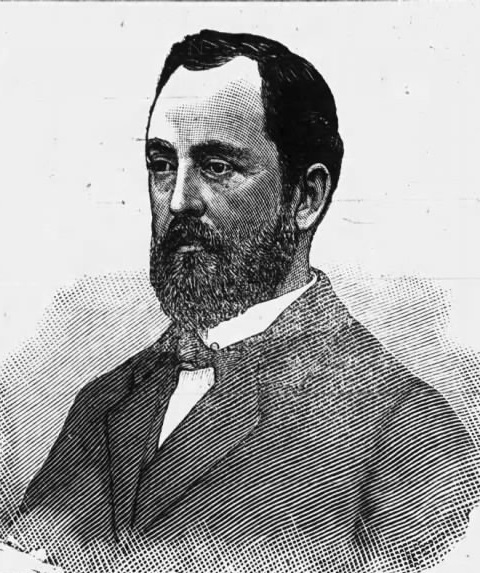

Member of the U.S. House of Representatives from Pennsylvania's 12th district
- In office March 4, 1883 – March 3, 1885
- Preceded by: Joseph A. Scranton
- Succeeded by: Joseph A. Scranton

Personal details
- Born: April 24, 1847 Cochecton, New York, US
- Died: December 4, 1894 (aged 47)
- Party: Democratic

Daniel Ward Connolly (April 24, 1847 – December 4, 1894) was an American lawyer and politician who served one term as a Democratic member of the U.S. House of Representatives from Pennsylvania from 1883 to 1885.

== Life and career ==
Daniel Connolly was born in Cochecton, New York, and moved with his parents to Scranton, Pennsylvania, in 1849. he attended the local schools, studied law, and was admitted to the bar in June, 1870. Connolly practiced law in Scranton.

He was elected president judge of Lackawanna County in 1878 but did not serve because the State supreme court held that there was no vacancy. He was an unsuccessful candidate for election to Congress in 1880.

=== Congress ===
In 1882, he was elected as a Democrat to the 48th Congress (March 4, 1883 – March 3, 1885). He was unsuccessful candidate for reelection in 1884.

=== Later career and death ===
After serving in Congress, he was appointed postmaster of Scranton; he served from May 2, 1885 to March 29, 1889.

Connolly died in Scranton on December 4, 1894, and was buried at Forest Hill Cemetery in Scranton.

== Sources ==
- United States Congress. "Daniel W. Connolly (id: C000696)". Biographical Directory of the United States Congress.

U.S. House of Representatives
Preceded by Joseph A. Scranton	Member of the U.S. House of Representatives from Pennsylvania's 12th congressional district 1883–1885	Succeeded by Joseph A. Scranton
