= Mortimer Fitzland Elliott =

American politician

Mortimer F. Elliott
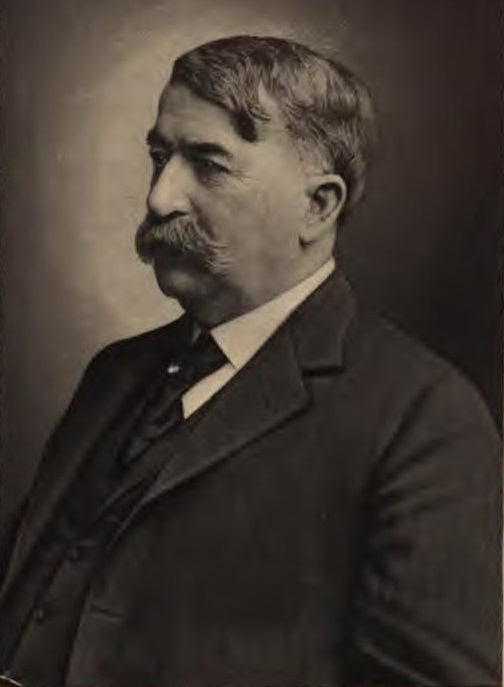
- From Volume I (1911) of Romance of American Petroleum and Gas

Member of the U.S. House of Representatives from Pennsylvania's at-large district
- In office March 4, 1883 – March 3, 1885
- Preceded by: District created
- Succeeded by: Edwin Sylvanus Osborne

Personal details
- Born: September 24, 1839 Cherry Flats, Pennsylvania
- Died: August 5, 1920 (aged 80) Mansfield, Pennsylvania
- Party: Democratic
- Education: Alfred University

Mortimer Fitzland Elliott (September 24, 1839 – August 5, 1920) was a Democratic member of the U.S. House of Representatives from Pennsylvania.

== Biography ==
Mortimer F. Elliott was born in Cherry Flats, near Wellsboro, Pennsylvania. He attended the common schools, Wellsboro Academy, and Alfred University. He studied law, was admitted to the bar in 1860 and commenced practice in Wellsboro. He was a member of the convention to revise the constitution of Pennsylvania in 1873.

Elliott was elected as a Democrat to the Forty-eighth Congress. He was an unsuccessful candidate for reelection in 1884. He resumed the practice of law, and served as general solicitor for the Standard Oil Company in New York City. He died in Mansfield, Pennsylvania, 1920. Interment in Wellsboro Cemetery in Wellsboro.

== Sources ==
- United States Congress. "Mortimer Fitzland Elliott (id: E000126)". Biographical Directory of the United States Congress.
- The Political Graveyard

U.S. House of Representatives
Preceded by District created	Member of the U.S. House of Representatives from Pennsylvania's at-large congressional district 1883–1885	Succeeded by Edwin S. Osborne
