= Lemuel Amerman =

American politician (1846–1897)

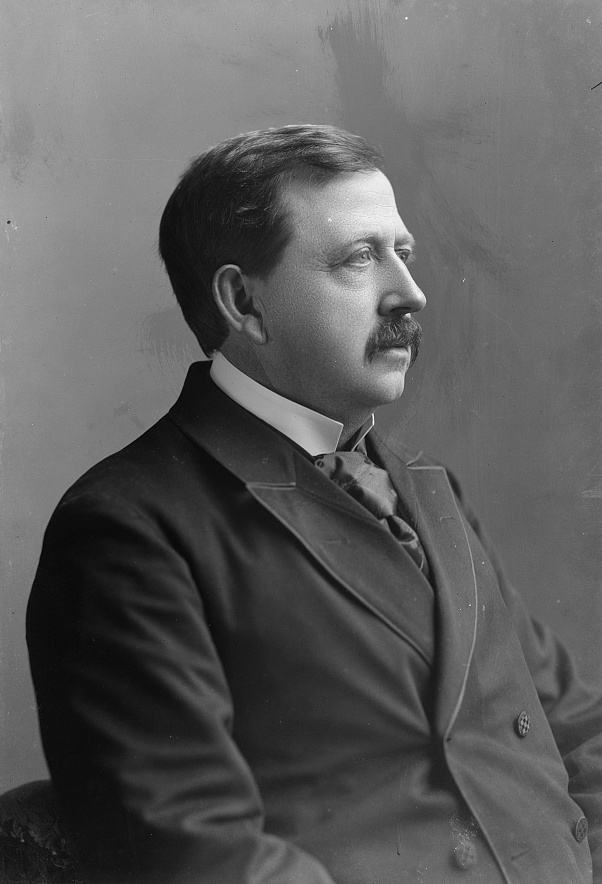

Member of the U.S. House of Representatives from Pennsylvania's 11th district
- In office March 4, 1891 – March 3, 1893
- Preceded by: Joseph A. Scranton
- Succeeded by: Joseph A. Scranton

Member of the Pennsylvania House of Representatives
- In office 1881–1884

Personal details
- Born: October 29, 1846 Danville, Pennsylvania
- Died: October 7, 1897 (aged 50) Blossburg, Pennsylvania
- Party: Democratic
- Education: Bucknell University

Lemuel Amerman (October 29, 1846 – October 7, 1897) was an American lawyer and politician who served one term as a Democratic member of the U.S. House of Representatives from Pennsylvania from 1891 to 1893.

== Life and career ==
Lemuel Amerman was born near Danville, Pennsylvania. He attended the Danville Academy, and graduated from Bucknell University in Lewisburg, Pennsylvania, in 1869. He taught school for three years. He studied law, was admitted to the bar in 1873 and commenced practice in Philadelphia, Pennsylvania.

He moved to Scranton, Pennsylvania, in 1876 and continued the practice of law. He was also engaged in banking. He served as solicitor for Lackawanna County, Pennsylvania, in 1879 and 1880.

He was a member of the Pennsylvania State House of Representatives from 1881 to 1884. One of the important bills that he fathered and championed was an act providing for free public instruction in Pennsylvania.

He was elected city comptroller of Scranton in 1885 and 1886, and reporter of the decisions of the Pennsylvania Supreme Court in 1886 and 1887. For seven years, he was superintendent of the dynamic and socially concerned Penn Avenue Baptist Church in Scranton (later Immanuel Baptist Church).

== Congress ==
Amerman was elected as a Democrat to the Fifty-second Congress. He was an unsuccessful candidate for reelection in 1892. He continued the practice of law in Scranton until his death in Blossburg, Pennsylvania, at the age of 50. Interment in Forest Hill Cemetery in Scranton.

== Personal life ==
After the death of his first wife, he married Mary Caroline Van Nort (born September 2, 1859), who was in the first graduating class of Scranton High School. She later became a public school teacher in Scranton. Lemuel and Mary Amerman had a son, Ralph, born 1884, and a daughter, Mary Caroline, born February 14, 1886. The mother died in childbirth on that day.

In 1910, Mary Caroline Amerman married Frederick Lewis of Norfolk, Virginia. Frederick Lewis eventually became the Vice President of the Norfolk Ledger-Dispatch Corp and of Norfolk Newspapers, Inc. In 1940, their daughter, Mary Caroline Lewis married Eleuthere Paul DuPont Jr (son of the founder of DuPont Motors).

Lemuel Amerman died in Blossburg on October 7, 1897.

== Sources ==
- United States Congress. "Lemuel Amerman (id: A000171)". Biographical Directory of the United States Congress.
- The Political Graveyard

U.S. House of Representatives
Preceded by Joseph A. Scranton	Member of the U.S. House of Representatives from Pennsylvania's 11th congressional district 1891–1893	Succeeded by Joseph A. Scranton
