= 1888 United States House of Representatives elections in Florida =

United States House of Representatives elections in Florida, 1888
- November 6, 1888

Both of Florida's seats to the United States House of Representatives
	Majority party	Minority party
Party	Democratic	Republican
Last election	2	0
Seats won	2	0
Seat change	Steady	Steady
Popular vote	39,836	27,134
Percentage	59.5%	40.5%

The 1888 United States House of Representatives elections in Florida were held November 6, 1888 for the 51st Congress. These elections were held concurrently with the 1888 Presidential election and election for governor.

== Background ==
Florida was represented by two Representatives from 1872 through 1900. Since 1884, both Representatives had been Democrats, with the Republicans in permanent minority status, which would not end until 1954.

== Election results ==
Incumbent Charles Dougherty of the 2nd district did not run for re-election.

1888 United States House election results
District	Democratic			Republican		
1st	Robert H. M. Davidson (I)	19,824	67.1%	Henry R. Benjamin	9,717	32.9%
2nd	Robert Bullock	20,012	53.5%	Frederick S. Goodrich	17,417	46.5%

== See also ==
- United States House of Representatives elections, 1888
