= Joseph A. Scranton =

American politician (1838–1908)

Joseph Augustine Scranton
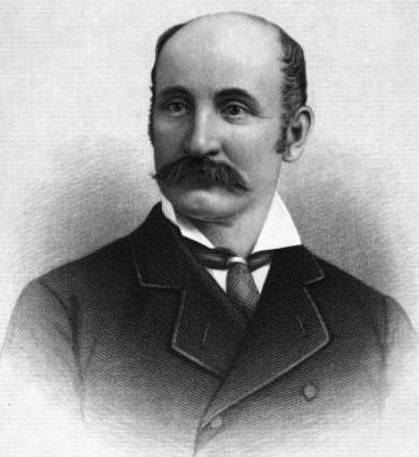

Member of the U.S. House of Representatives from Pennsylvania
- In office March 4, 1881 – March 3, 1883
- Preceded by: Hendrick B. Wright
- Succeeded by: Daniel W. Connolly
- Constituency: 12th district
- In office March 4, 1885 – March 3, 1887
- Preceded by: Daniel W. Connolly
- Succeeded by: John Lynch
- Constituency: 12th district
- In office March 4, 1889 – March 3, 1891
- Preceded by: Charles R. Buckalew
- Succeeded by: Lemuel Amerman
- Constituency: 11th district
- In office March 4, 1893 – March 3, 1897
- Preceded by: Lemuel Amerman
- Succeeded by: William Connell
- Constituency: 11th district

Personal details
- Born: July 26, 1838 Madison, Connecticut, U.S.
- Died: October 12, 1908 (aged 70) Scranton, Pennsylvania, U.S.
- Party: Republican
- Spouse: Ada Meylert (m. 1864)
- Children: 2
- Education: Phillips Academy; Yale University

Joseph Augustine Scranton (July 26, 1838 – October 12, 1908) was a Republican politician who represented Pennsylvania in the United States House of Representatives from 1881 to 1883, 1885 to 1887, 1889 to 1891, and 1893 to 1897.

== Life and career ==
Scranton was born in Madison, Connecticut on July 26, 1838. When he was a boy, his family moved to Pennsylvania, settling in the Lackawanna Valley in northeastern Pennsylvania. This area was developed for anthracite coal mining, and as the site of the city of Scranton, which was named after the family. Joseph Scranton attended Phillips Academy in Andover, Massachusetts, and Yale University from 1857 to 1861.

After completing his studies at Yale, Scranton served as "collector of internal revenue" from 1862 until 1866, a post of political patronage. In 1867, he founded the Scranton Daily Republican newspaper. He served as a delegate to the Republican National Convention in 1872. He was appointed as Scranton's United States postmaster from March 19, 1874, to May 5, 1881.

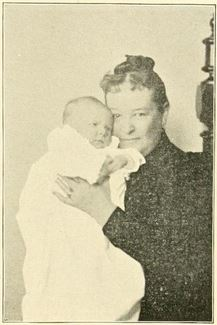
Ada Elizabeth Meylert and her grandson

He married Ada Meylert, the daughter of General Amos N. Meylert, one of the most prominent citizens of Northern Pennsylvania of his day. Her grandfather, Secku Meylert, was a native of Cassel, Prussia. He was associated in banking operations with the Rothchilds. He could speak half a dozen languages, was educated in Paris, and became acquainted with Napoleon Bonaparte. After Napoleon's defeat, he immigrated to the United States and purchased a large tract in Pennsylvania and settled at Montrose. Some years later he married Abigail Nichols of Montrose, daughter of a deacon of the Baptist Church. Their eldest son, Amos N. Meylert, married Anna Dennis. General Meylert and his family moved to Butler, where he became interested in the building of railroads and developing coal, iron and the resources of the country, amassing a considerable fortune. Ada Meylert attended the Greenwood Institute at New Brighton. Later they moved to Scranton, where she met J.A. Scranton, who belonged to the old Scranton family of Connecticut. They had one daughter who married Lieut. D.L. Tate, and one son, Robert Meylert Scranton who married Helen L. Sperry in 1890.

In 1880, Scranton was elected to Congress for the first time, serving in the 47th Congress. He was defeated in 1882, but won in 1884. He was defeated again in 1886, but won a third term in 1888.

Scranton ran again in 1890 but was defeated, after which he resumed his newspaper career. He was subsequently elected to two consecutive terms in 1892 and 1894. In 1896, he chose not to run and re-entered the newspaper business, joining the Daily Republican as both editor and publisher. Scranton entered political life again, being elected as Treasurer of Lackawanna County from 1901 to 1903. He died in Scranton in 1908.

Joseph Scranton was second cousin to industrialist George W. Scranton, founder of Lackawanna Iron & Coal and the city of Scranton. His grandnephew, William Warren Scranton, was elected as Governor of Pennsylvania, serving 1963–1967, and also served as U.S. Ambassador to the United Nations; and his great-grandnephew, William Scranton, III, served as Lieutenant Governor of Pennsylvania.

U.S. House of Representatives
Preceded by Hendrick B. Wright	Member of the U.S. House of Representatives from Pennsylvania's 12th congressional district 1881–1883	Succeeded by Daniel W. Connolly
Preceded by Daniel W. Connolly	Member of the U.S. House of Representatives from Pennsylvania's 12th congressional district 1885–1887	Succeeded by John Lynch
Preceded by Charles R. Buckalew	Member of the U.S. House of Representatives from Pennsylvania's 11th congressional district 1889–1891	Succeeded by Lemuel Amerman
Preceded by Lemuel Amerman	Member of the U.S. House of Representatives from Pennsylvania's 11th congressional district 1893–1897	Succeeded by William Connell
