= John Lynch (Pennsylvania politician) =

American politician

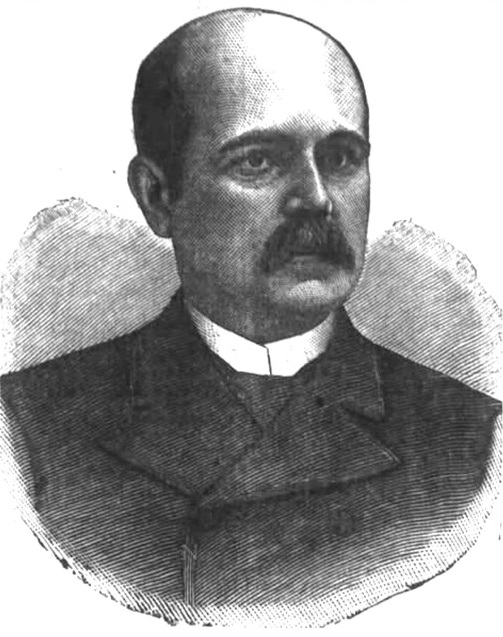

Member of the U.S. House of Representatives from Pennsylvania's 12th district
- In office March 4, 1887 – March 4, 1889
- Preceded by: Joseph A. Scranton
- Succeeded by: Edwin S. Osborne

Personal details
- Born: November 1, 1843 Providence, Rhode Island, US
- Died: August 17, 1910 (aged 66) Atlantic City, New Jersey, US
- Resting place: St. Mary's Cemetery in Wilkes-Barre, Pennsylvania
- Party: Democratic

John Lynch (November 1, 1843 – August 17, 1910) was an American lawyer and politician who served one term as a Democratic member of the U.S. House of Representatives from Pennsylvania from 1887 to 1889.

== Biography ==
John Lynch was born in Providence, Rhode Island. In 1856, he moved to Pennsylvania with his parents, who settled in Wilkes-Barre, Pennsylvania. He attended the public schools and Wyoming Seminary in Kingston, Pennsylvania.

He worked on a farm and in the coal mines and taught school. He studied law, was admitted to the bar November 1, 1868, and commenced practice in Wilkes-Barre.

=== Congress ===
Lynch was elected as a Democrat to the Fiftieth Congress. He was an unsuccessful candidate for reelection in 1888.

He resumed the practice of law in Wilkes-Barre, and served as judge of the court of common pleas from 1892 to 1910.

=== Death ===
He died in Atlantic City, New Jersey, in 1910. Interment in St. Mary's Cemetery in Wilkes-Barre.

== Sources ==
- United States Congress. "John Lynch (id: L000532)". Biographical Directory of the United States Congress.
- The Political Graveyard

U.S. House of Representatives
Preceded by Joseph A. Scranton	Member of the U.S. House of Representatives from Pennsylvania's 12th congressional district 1887–1889	Succeeded by Edwin S. Osborne
