= Edwin S. Osborne =

American politician

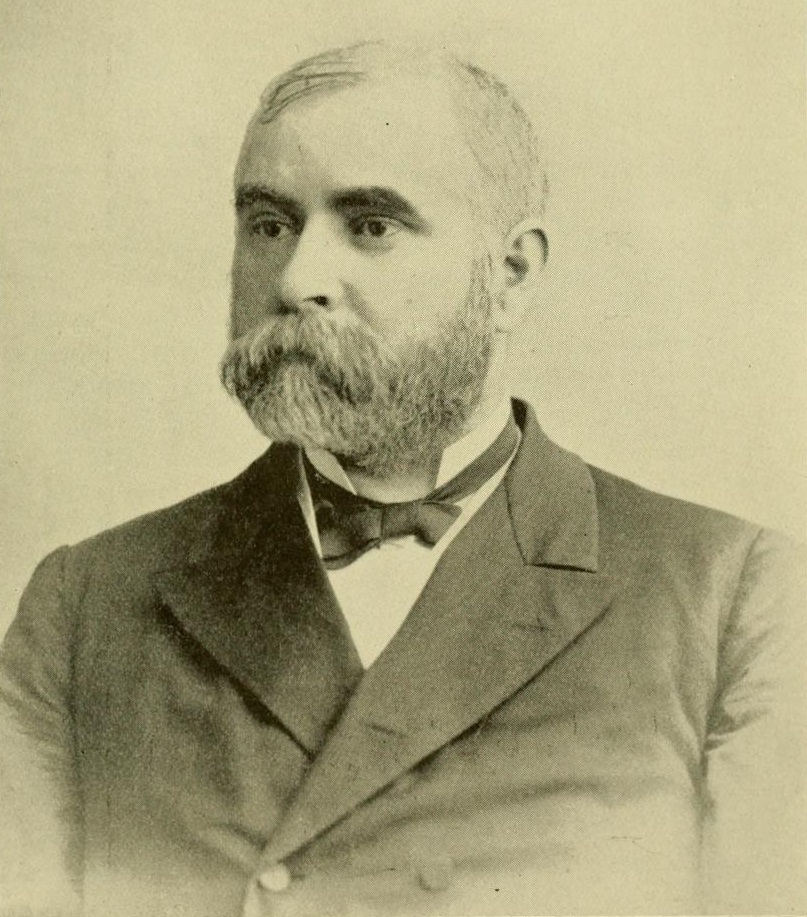
- Osborne c. 1893

Member of the United States Congress
- In office March 4, 1885 – March 3, 1891

Personal details
- Born: August 7, 1839 Bethany, Pennsylvania, U.S.
- Died: January 1, 1900 (aged 60) Washington, D.C., U.S.
- Resting place: Arlington National Cemetery
- Other political affiliations: Republican
- Occupation: Soldier, lawyer, politician

Military service
- Allegiance: United States of America
- Branch/service: Union army
- Years of service: 1862–1865
- Rank: Captain
- Unit: 149th Pennsylvania Infantry Regiment
- Commands: Company F, 149th Pennsylvania Infantry Regiment
- Battles/wars: American Civil War

Edwin Sylvanus Osborne (August 7, 1839 – January 1, 1900) was a Republican member of the U.S. House of Representatives from Pennsylvania.

== Biography ==
Edwin S. Osborne was born in Bethany, Pennsylvania. He attended the public schools and the University of Northern Pennsylvania at Bethany. He graduated from the New York State and National Law School at Albany, New York, in 1860. He was admitted to the bar and practiced law in Wilkes-Barre, Pennsylvania. He entered the Union Army on August 30, 1862, as captain of Company F of the 149th Pennsylvania Infantry Regiment. He was promoted to major of that regiment on February 25, 1865, and served until honorably discharged on July 25, 1865.

He was appointed by Governor John W. Geary as major general of the National Guard, Third Division, of Pennsylvania in 1870. He served as commander of the Department of Pennsylvania in the Grand Army of the Republic in 1883.

Osborne elected as a Republican to the Forty-ninth, Fiftieth, and Fifty-first Congresses. He was not a candidate for renomination in 1890. He was a delegate to the 1888 Republican National Convention. He resumed the practice of law in Wilkes-Barre. In 1898 he moved to Washington, D.C., and lived in retirement until his death on January 1, 1900. Interment in Arlington National Cemetery.

U.S. House of Representatives
Preceded by Mortimer Fitzland Elliott	Member of the U.S. House of Representatives from Pennsylvania's at-large congressional district 1885–1889	Succeeded by 28th Pennsylvania: James Kerr
Preceded by John Lynch	Member of the U.S. House of Representatives from Pennsylvania's 12th congressional district 1889–1891	Succeeded by George W. Shonk
