= List of United States representatives from New York =

The following is a list of United States representatives from the state of New York. For chronological tables of members of both houses of the United States Congress from the state (through the present day), see New York's congressional delegations. The list of names should be complete as of January 3, 2025, but other data may be incomplete.

== Current members ==
- 1st district: Nick LaLota (R) (since 2023)
- 2nd district: Andrew Garbarino (R) (since 2021)
- 3rd district: Tom Suozzi (D) (since 2024)
- 4th district: Laura Gillen (D) (since 2025)
- 5th district: Gregory Meeks (D) (since 1998)
- 6th district: Grace Meng (D) (since 2013)
- 7th district: Nydia Velázquez (D) (since 1993)
- 8th district: Hakeem Jeffries (D) (since 2013)
- 9th district: Yvette Clarke (D) (since 2007)
- 10th district: Dan Goldman (D) (since 2023)
- 11th district: Nicole Malliotakis (R) (since 2021)
- 12th district: Jerry Nadler (D) (since 1992)
- 13th district: Adriano Espaillat (D) (since 2017)
- 14th district: Alexandria Ocasio-Cortez (D) (since 2019)
- 15th district: Ritchie Torres (D) (since 2021)
- 16th district: George Latimer (D) (since 2025)
- 17th district: Mike Lawler (R) (since 2023)
- 18th district: Pat Ryan (D) (since 2022)
- 19th district: Josh Riley (D) (since 2025)
- 20th district: Paul Tonko (D) (since 2009)
- 21st district: Elise Stefanik (R) (since 2015)
- 22nd district: John Mannion (D) (since 2025)
- 23rd district: Nick Langworthy (R) (since 2023)
- 24th district: Claudia Tenney (R) (since 2021)
- 25th district: Joseph Morelle (D) (since 2018)
- 26th district: Tim Kennedy (D) (since 2024)

== List of members ==
The list of names should be complete, but other data may be incomplete.

Member	Party	District	Years	District home	Electoral history
Bella Abzug	Democratic	19th	January 3, 1971 – January 3, 1973	Manhattan	Retired to run for U.S. Senate.
Bella Abzug	Democratic	20th	January 3, 1973 – January 3, 1977	Manhattan	Retired to run for U.S. Senate.
Gary Ackerman	Democratic	7th	March 1, 1983 – January 3, 1993	Queens	Retired.
Gary Ackerman	Democratic	5th	January 3, 1993 – January 3, 2013	Queens	Retired.
Charles H. Adams	Republican	16th	March 4, 1875 – March 3, 1877	Cohoes	Lost re-election.
John Adams	Jacksonian	8th	March 4, 1833 – March 3, 1835	Durham	?
John J. Adams	Democratic	8th	March 4, 1883 – March 3, 1885	Manhattan	?
John J. Adams	Democratic	7th	March 4, 1885 – March 3, 1887	Manhattan	?
Parmenio Adams	Democratic-Republican	29th	January 7, 1824 – March 3, 1825	Batavia	Retired to return to personal businesses.
Parmenio Adams	Anti-Jacksonian	29th	March 4, 1825 – March 3, 1827	Batavia	Retired to return to personal businesses.
Joseph P. Addabbo	Democratic	5th	January 3, 1961 – January 3, 1963	Queens	Died.
Joseph P. Addabbo	Democratic	7th	January 3, 1963 – January 3, 1983	Queens	Died.
Joseph P. Addabbo	Democratic	6th	January 3, 1983 – April 10, 1986	Queens	Died.
Asa Adgate	Democratic-Republican	12th	December 7, 1815 – March 3, 1817	Chesterfield	Chose not to run for re-election.
Theron Akin	Progressive Republican	25th	March 4, 1911 – March 3, 1913	Fort Johnson	Unsuccessful in renomination twice. Became Mayor of Amsterdam, New York
De Alva S. Alexander	Republican	33rd	March 4, 1897 – March 3, 1903	Buffalo	?
De Alva S. Alexander	Republican	36th	March 4, 1903 – March 3, 1911	Buffalo	?
Henry P. Alexander	Whig	17th	March 4, 1849 – March 3, 1851	Little Falls	?
Judson Allen	Democratic	20th	March 4, 1839 – March 3, 1841	Harpursville	?
Nathaniel Allen	Democratic-Republican	21st	March 4, 1819 – March 3, 1821	Richmond	?
Jerome Ambro	Democratic	3rd	January 3, 1975 – January 3, 1981	Huntington	Retired to become a lobbyist and a governmental and legislative consultant.
Joseph H. Anderson	Democratic	7th	March 4, 1843 – March 3, 1847	White Plains	?
George Rex Andrews	Whig	14th	March 4, 1849 – March 3, 1851	Ticonderoga	?
John T. Andrews	Democratic	27th	March 4, 1837 – March 3, 1839	Bath	?
Samuel G. Andrews	Republican	29th	March 4, 1857 – March 3, 1859	Rochester	?
Walter G. Andrews	Republican	40th	March 4, 1931 – January 3, 1945	Buffalo	?
Walter G. Andrews	Republican	42nd	January 3, 1945 – January 3, 1949	Buffalo	?
John Emory Andrus	Republican	19th	March 4, 1905 – March 3, 1913	Yonkers	?
Victor Anfuso	Democratic	8th	January 3, 1951 – January 3, 1953	Brooklyn	?
Victor Anfuso	Democratic	8th	January 3, 1955 – January 3, 1963	Brooklyn	?
William G. Angel	Jacksonian	13th	March 4, 1825 – March 3, 1827	Burlington	?
William G. Angel	Jacksonian	13th	March 4, 1829 – March 3, 1833	Burlington	?
Martin C. Ansorge	Republican	21st	March 4, 1921 – March 3, 1923	Manhattan	Lost re-election.
Mike Arcuri	Democratic	24th	January 3, 2007 – January 3, 2011	Utica	Lost re-election.
Benedict Arnold	Anti-Jacksonian	16th	March 4, 1829 – March 3, 1831	Amsterdam	?
John Arnot Jr.	Democratic	29th	March 4, 1883 – March 3, 1885	Elmira	Died.
John Arnot Jr.	Democratic	28th	March 4, 1885 – November 20, 1886	Elmira	Died.
Henry Ashley	Jacksonian	11th	March 4, 1825 – March 3, 1827	Catskill	?
Daniel Avery	Democratic-Republican	14th	March 4, 1811 – March 3, 1813	Scipio	?
Daniel Avery	Democratic-Republican	20th	March 4, 1813 – March 3, 1815	Scipio	?
Daniel Avery	Democratic-Republican	20th	September 30, 1816 – March 3, 1817	Scipio	?
Steven Beckwith Ayres	Independent Democratic	18th	March 4, 1911 – March 3, 1913	Manhattan	?
Alfred Babcock	Whig	33rd	March 4, 1841 – March 3, 1843	Gaines	?
Leander Babcock	Democratic	23rd	March 4, 1851 – March 3, 1853	Oswego	?
William Babcock	Anti-Masonic	26th	March 4, 1831 – March 3, 1833	Penn Yan	?
Henry Bacon	Democratic	15th	December 6, 1886 – March 3, 1889	Goshen	?
Henry Bacon	Democratic	15th	March 4, 1891 – March 3, 1893	Goshen	?
Robert L. Bacon	Republican	1st	March 4, 1923 – September 12, 1938	Old Westbury	Died.
William J. Bacon	Republican	23rd	March 4, 1877 – March 3, 1879	Utica	?
Luther Badger	Anti-Jacksonian	23rd	March 4, 1825 – March 3, 1827	Jamesville	?
Herman Badillo	Democratic	22nd	January 3, 1971 – January 3, 1973	Bronx	Resigned to become Deputy Mayor of New York City.
Herman Badillo	Democratic	21st	January 3, 1973 – December 31, 1977	Bronx	Resigned to become Deputy Mayor of New York City.
George A. Bagley	Republican	22nd	March 4, 1875 – March 3, 1879	Watertown	?
John H. Bagley Jr.	Democratic	15th	March 4, 1875 – March 3, 1877	Catskill	?
John H. Bagley Jr.	Democratic	15th	March 4, 1883 – March 3, 1885	Catskill	?
Alexander H. Bailey	Republican	21st	November 30, 1867 – March 3, 1871	Rome	Retired.
John Mosher Bailey	Republican	16th	November 5, 1878 – March 3, 1881	Albany	?
Theodorus Bailey	Anti-Administration	5th	March 4, 1793 – March 3, 1795	Poughkeepsie	?
Theodorus Bailey	Democratic-Republican	5th	March 4, 1795 – March 3, 1797	Poughkeepsie	?
Theodorus Bailey	Democratic-Republican	5th	March 4, 1799 – March 3, 1801	Poughkeepsie	?
Theodorus Bailey	Democratic-Republican	5th	December 7, 1801 – March 3, 1803	Poughkeepsie	?
Caleb Baker	Democratic-Republican	20th	March 4, 1819 – March 3, 1821	Elmira	?
Charles S. Baker	Republican	30th	March 4, 1885 – March 3, 1891	Rochester	?
Robert Baker	Democratic	6th	March 4, 1903 – March 3, 1905	Brooklyn	?
Stephen Baker	Republican	12th	March 4, 1861 – March 3, 1863	Poughkeepsie	?
William H. Baker	Republican	24th	March 4, 1875 – March 3, 1879	Constantia	?
Joseph C. Baldwin	Republican	17th	March 11, 1941 – January 3, 1947	Manhattan	?
Daniel D. Barnard	Anti-Jacksonian	27th	March 4, 1827 – March 3, 1829	Albany	?
Daniel D. Barnard	Whig	10th	March 4, 1839 – March 3, 1843	Albany	?
Daniel D. Barnard	Whig	13th	March 4, 1843 – March 3, 1845	Albany	?
Demas Barnes	Democratic	2nd	March 4, 1867 – March 3, 1869	Brooklyn	?
Thomas J. Barr	Democratic	4th	January 17, 1859 – March 3, 1861	Manhattan	?
Robert R. Barry	Republican	27th	January 3, 1959 – January 3, 1963	Yonkers	?
Robert R. Barry	Republican	25th	January 3, 1963 – January 3, 1965	Yonkers	?
William Bernard Barry	Democratic	2nd	November 5, 1935 – January 3, 1945	Queens	Died.
William Bernard Barry	Democratic	4th	January 3, 1945 – October 20, 1946	Queens	Died.
Gamaliel H. Barstow	Anti-Masonic	25th	March 4, 1831 – March 3, 1833	Nichols	?
Franklin Bartlett	Democratic	7th	March 4, 1893 – March 3, 1897	Manhattan	?
Bruce Fairchild Barton	Republican	17th	November 2, 1937 – January 3, 1941	Manhattan	?
Samuel Barton	Jacksonian	2nd	March 4, 1835 – March 3, 1837	Richmond	?
Lyman K. Bass	Republican	31st	March 4, 1873 – March 3, 1875	Buffalo	?
Lyman K. Bass	Republican	32nd	March 4, 1875 – March 3, 1877	Buffalo	?
Edward Bassett	Democratic	5th	March 4, 1903 – March 3, 1905	Brooklyn	?
Lewis Beach	Democratic	14th	March 4, 1881 – March 3, 1885	Cornwall	Died.
Lewis Beach	Democratic	15th	March 4, 1885 – August 10, 1886	Cornwall	Died.
Charles Lewis Beale	Republican	12th	March 4, 1859 – March 3, 1861	Kinderhook	?
Samuel Beardsley	Jacksonian	14th	March 4, 1831 – March 3, 1833	Utica	Resigned to become circuit judge.
Samuel Beardsley	Jacksonian	17th	March 4, 1833 – March 29, 1836	Utica	Resigned to become circuit judge.
Samuel Beardsley	Democratic	20th	March 4, 1843 – February 29, 1844	Utica	Resigned to become associate justice of New York Supreme Court.
Frank J. Becker	Republican	3rd	January 3, 1953 – January 3, 1963	Lynbrook	?
Frank J. Becker	Republican	5th	January 3, 1963 – January 3, 1965	Lynbrook	?
George M. Beebe	Democratic	14th	March 4, 1875 – March 3, 1879	Monticello	?
Thomas Beekman	Anti-Jacksonian	22nd	March 4, 1829 – March 3, 1831	Peterboro	?
Cyrus Beers	Democratic	22nd	December 3, 1838 – March 3, 1839	Ithaca	?
Alfred F. Beiter	Democratic	41st	March 4, 1933 – January 3, 1939	Williamsville	?
Alfred F. Beiter	Democratic	41st	January 3, 1941 – January 3, 1943	Williamsville	?
George O. Belden	Jacksonian	7th	March 4, 1827 – March 3, 1829	Monticello	?
James J. Belden	Republican	25th	November 8, 1887 – March 3, 1893	Syracuse	?
James J. Belden	Republican	27th	March 4, 1893 – March 3, 1895	Syracuse	?
James J. Belden	Republican	27th	March 4, 1897 – March 3, 1899	Syracuse	?
Joseph M. Belford	Republican	1st	March 4, 1897 – March 3, 1899	Riverhead	?
Oliver Belmont	Democratic	13th	March 4, 1901 – March 3, 1903	Manhattan	?
Perry Belmont	Democratic	1st	March 4, 1881 – December 1, 1888	Babylon	Resigned to become U.S. Minister to Spain.
Charles B. Benedict	Democratic	31st	March 4, 1877 – March 3, 1879	Attica	?
Augustus W. Bennet	Republican	29th	January 3, 1945 – January 3, 1947	Newburgh	?
William Stiles Bennet	Republican	17th	March 4, 1905 – March 3, 1911	Manhattan	?
William Stiles Bennet	Republican	23rd	November 2, 1915 – March 3, 1917	Manhattan	?
Charles G. Bennett	Republican	5th	March 4, 1895 – March 3, 1899	Brooklyn	?
David S. Bennett	Republican	30th	March 4, 1869 – March 3, 1871	Buffalo	?
Henry Bennett	Whig	22nd	March 4, 1849 – March 3, 1853	New Berlin	Lost re-election.
Henry Bennett	Whig	21st	March 4, 1853 – March 3, 1855	New Berlin	Lost re-election.
Henry Bennett	Opposition	21st	March 4, 1855 – March 3, 1857	New Berlin	Lost re-election.
Henry Bennett	Republican	21st	March 4, 1857 – March 3, 1859	New Berlin	Lost re-election.
Egbert Benson	Pro-Administration	3rd	March 4, 1789 – March 3, 1793	Red Hook	?
Egbert Benson	Federalist	2nd	March 4, 1813 – August 2, 1813	?	Resigned.
Henry Wilbur Bentley	Democratic	23rd	March 4, 1891 – March 3, 1893	Boonville	?
Charles S. Benton	Democratic	17th	March 4, 1843 – March 3, 1847	Mohawk	?
John T. Bergen	Democratic	2nd	March 4, 1831 – March 3, 1833	Brooklyn	?
Teunis G. Bergen	Democratic	2nd	March 4, 1865 – March 3, 1867	New Utrecht	?
Samuel Betts	Democratic-Republican	7th	March 4, 1815 – March 3, 1817	Newburgh	?
Mario Biaggi	Democratic	24th	January 3, 1969 – January 3, 1973	Bronx	Resigned.
Mario Biaggi	Democratic	10th	January 3, 1973 – January 3, 1983	Bronx	Resigned.
Mario Biaggi	Democratic	19th	January 3, 1983 – August 5, 1988	Bronx	Resigned.
Bennet Bicknell	Democratic	23rd	March 4, 1837 – March 3, 1839	Morrisville	?
Jonathan Brewster Bingham	Democratic	23rd	January 3, 1965 – January 3, 1973	Bronx	?
Jonathan Brewster Bingham	Democratic	22nd	January 3, 1973 – January 3, 1983	Bronx	?
John Bird	Federalist	6th	March 4, 1799 – July 25, 1801	?	Resigned.
Ausburn Birdsall	Democratic	22nd	March 4, 1847 – March 3, 1849	Binghamton	?
James Birdsall	Democratic-Republican	15th	March 4, 1815 – March 3, 1817	Norwich	?
Samuel Birdsall	Democratic	25th	March 4, 1837 – March 3, 1839	Waterloo	?
Victory Birdseye	Democratic-Republican	19th	March 4, 1815 – March 3, 1817	Pompey	?
Victory Birdseye	Whig	23rd	March 4, 1841 – March 3, 1843	Pompey	?
Tim Bishop	Democratic	1st	January 3, 2003 – January 3, 2015	Southampton	?
Frank S. Black	Republican	19th	March 4, 1895 – January 7, 1897	Troy	Resigned when elected Governor of New York.
Loring M. Black Jr.	Democratic	5th	March 4, 1923 – January 3, 1935	Manhattan	?
Esbon Blackmar	Whig	27th	December 4, 1848 – March 3, 1849	Newark	?
Bernard Blair	Whig	12th	March 4, 1841 – March 3, 1843	Salem	?
John Blake Jr.	Democratic-Republican	5th	March 4, 1805 – March 3, 1809	Montgomery	?
Harmanus Bleecker	Federalist	7th	March 4, 1811 – March 3, 1813	Albany	?
Archibald M. Bliss	Democratic	4th	March 4, 1875 – March 3, 1883	Brooklyn	?
Archibald M. Bliss	Democratic	5th	March 4, 1885 – March 3, 1889	Brooklyn	?
Isaac Bloom	Democratic-Republican	6th	March 4, 1803 – April 26, 1803	?	Died.
Sol Bloom	Democratic	19th	January 30, 1923 – January 3, 1945	Manhattan	Died.
Sol Bloom	Democratic	20th	January 3, 1945 – March 7, 1949	Manhattan	Died.
Abraham Bockee	Jacksonian	5th	March 4, 1829 – March 3, 1831	Federal Store	?
Abraham Bockee	Jacksonian	5th	March 4, 1833 – March 3, 1837	Federal Store	?
Charles Bodle	Jacksonian	7th	March 4, 1833 – March 3, 1835	Bloomingburg	?
Sherwood Boehlert	Republican	25th	January 3, 1983 – January 3, 1993	New Hartford	?
Sherwood Boehlert	Republican	23rd	January 3, 1993 – January 3, 2003	New Hartford	?
Sherwood Boehlert	Republican	24th	January 3, 2003 – January 3, 2007	New Hartford	?
David A. Bokee	Whig	2nd	March 4, 1849 – March 3, 1851	Brooklyn	?
Charles G. Bond	Republican	8th	March 4, 1921 – March 3, 1923	Brooklyn	?
Azariah Boody	Whig	29th	March 4, 1853 – Oct 1853	Rochester	Resigned.
David A. Boody	Democratic	2nd	March 4, 1891 – October 13, 1891	Brooklyn	Resigned to become railroad commissioner of New York State.
Charles Borland Jr.	Democratic-Republican	6th	November 8, 1821 – March 3, 1823	Wardsbridge	?
Peter I. Borst	Jacksonian	12th	March 4, 1829 – March 3, 1831	Middleburg	?
Albert H. Bosch	Republican	5th	January 3, 1953 – December 31, 1960	Queens	Resigned to become judge for Queens County.
Joseph Bouck	Democratic	12th	March 4, 1831 – March 3, 1833	Middleburg	?
Matthias J. Bovee	Jacksonian	15th	March 4, 1835 – March 3, 1837	Amsterdam	?
John M. Bowers	Federalist	15th	June 21, 1813 – December 20, 1813	Cooperstown	Lost election contest to Isaac Williams Jr.
Jamaal Bowman	Democratic	16th	January 3, 2021 – January 3, 2025	Yonkers	Lost renomination to Latimer.
Obadiah Bowne	Whig	2nd	March 4, 1851 – March 3, 1853	Richmond	?
Samuel S. Bowne	Democratic	19th	March 4, 1841 – March 3, 1843	Cooperstown	?
Alexander Boyd	Federalist	13th	March 4, 1813 – March 3, 1815	Middleburg	?
John H. Boyd	Whig	14th	March 4, 1851 – March 3, 1853	Whitehall	?
John J. Boylan	Democratic	15th	March 4, 1923 – October 5, 1938	Manhattan	Died.
Thomas J. Bradley	Democratic	9th	March 4, 1897 – March 3, 1901	Manhattan	?
Thomas W. Bradley	Republican	20th	March 4, 1903 – March 3, 1913	Walden	?
Frank J. Brasco	Democratic	11th	January 3, 1967 – January 3, 1975	Brooklyn	?
Francis B. Brewer	Republican	33rd	March 4, 1883 – March 3, 1885	Westfield	?
David P. Brewster	Democratic	17th	March 4, 1839 – March 3, 1843	Oswego	?
Henry C. Brewster	Republican	31st	March 4, 1895 – March 3, 1899	Rochester	?
George Briggs	Whig	5th	March 4, 1849 – March 3, 1853	Manhattan	?
George Briggs	Republican	7th	March 4, 1859 – March 3, 1861	Manhattan	?
Anthony Brindisi	Democratic	22nd	January 3, 2019 – January 3, 2021	Utica	Term expired before election results were determined.
Henry Bristow	Republican	3rd	March 4, 1901 – March 3, 1903	Brooklyn	?
John C. Brodhead	Jacksonian	7th	March 4, 1831 – March 3, 1833	Modena	?
John C. Brodhead	Democratic	7th	March 4, 1837 – March 3, 1839	Modena	?
Isaac H. Bronson	Democratic	18th	March 4, 1837 – March 3, 1839	Watertown	?
David Brooks	Federalist	5th	March 4, 1797 – March 3, 1799	Poughkeepsie	?
James Brooks	Whig	6th	March 4, 1849 – March 3, 1853	New York City	?
James Brooks	Democratic	8th	March 4, 1863 – April 7, 1866	New York City	William E. Dodge contested the election.
James Brooks	Democratic	8th	March 4, 1867 – March 3, 1873	New York City	Died.
James Brooks	Democratic	6th	March 4, 1873 – April 30, 1873	New York City	Died.
Micah Brooks	Democratic-Republican	21st	March 4, 1815 – March 3, 1817	East Bloomfield	?
Anson Brown	Whig	11th	March 4, 1839 – June 14, 1840	Ballston	Died.
John W. Brown	Jacksonian	6th	March 4, 1833 – March 3, 1837	Newburgh	?
Lathrop Brown	Democratic	1st	March 4, 1913 – March 3, 1915	St. James	?
Henry Bruckner	Democratic	22nd	March 4, 1913 – December 31, 1917	Manhattan	Resigned.
William F. Brunner	Democratic	2nd	March 4, 1929 – September 27, 1935	Rockaway Park	Resigned when elected Sheriff of Queens County.
Andrew DeWitt Bruyn	Democratic	22nd	March 4, 1837 – July 27, 1838	Ithaca	Died.
Lloyd Bryce	Democratic	7th	March 4, 1887 – March 3, 1889	Manhattan	?
Ellsworth B. Buck	Republican	11th	June 6, 1944 – January 3, 1945	Staten Island	?
Ellsworth B. Buck	Republican	16th	January 3, 1945 – January 3, 1949	Staten Island	?
Charles A. Buckley	Democratic	23rd	January 3, 1935 – January 3, 1945	Bronx	?
Charles A. Buckley	Democratic	25th	January 3, 1945 – January 3, 1953	Bronx	?
Charles A. Buckley	Democratic	24th	January 3, 1953 – January 3, 1963	Bronx	?
Charles A. Buckley	Democratic	23rd	January 3, 1963 – January 3, 1965	Bronx	?
Alexander H. Buell	Democratic	17th	March 4, 1851 – January 29, 1853	Fairfield	Died.
Ann Marie Buerkle	Republican	25th	January 3, 2011 – January 3, 2013	Syracuse	?
Solomon Bundy	Republican	21st	March 4, 1877 – March 3, 1879	Oxford	Retired.
Rudolph Bunner	Jacksonian	20th	March 4, 1827 – March 3, 1829	Oswego	?
Thomas L. Bunting	Democratic	33rd	March 4, 1891 – March 3, 1893	Hamburg	?
Thomas F. Burchill	Democratic	15th	January 3, 1943 – January 3, 1945	Manhattan	?
Henry G. Burleigh	Republican	17th	March 4, 1883 – March 3, 1885	Whitehall	?
Henry G. Burleigh	Republican	18th	March 4, 1885 – March 3, 1887	Whitehall	?
Silas M. Burroughs	Republican	31st	March 4, 1857 – June 3, 1860	Medina	Died.
Lorenzo Burrows	Whig	34th	March 4, 1849 – March 3, 1853	Albion	?
John Cornelius Butler	Republican	42nd	April 22, 1941 – January 3, 1945	Buffalo	?
John Cornelius Butler	Republican	44th	January 3, 1945 – January 3, 1949	Buffalo	?
John Cornelius Butler	Republican	44th	January 3, 1951 – January 3, 1953	Buffalo	?
Martin Butterfield	Republican	25th	March 4, 1859 – March 3, 1861	Palmyra	?
Daniel E. Button	Republican	29th	January 3, 1967 – January 3, 1971	Albany	?
William T. Byrne	Democratic	28th	January 3, 1937 – January 3, 1945	Albany	Died.
William T. Byrne	Democratic	32nd	January 3, 1945 – January 27, 1952	Albany	Died.
Daniel Cady	Federalist	14th	March 4, 1815 – March 3, 1817	Johnstown	?
John W. Cady	Democratic-Republican	16th	March 4, 1823 – March 3, 1825	Johnstown	?
William M. Calder	Republican	6th	March 4, 1905 – March 3, 1915	Brooklyn	?
C. Pope Caldwell	Democratic	2nd	March 4, 1915 – March 3, 1921	Forest Hills	?
Hervey C. Calkin	Democratic	7th	March 4, 1869 – March 3, 1871	Manhattan	?
Churchill C. Cambreleng	Democratic-Republican	2nd	December 3, 1821 – March 3, 1823	Manhattan	?
Churchill C. Cambreleng	Democratic-Republican	3rd	March 4, 1823 – March 3, 1825	Manhattan	?
Churchill C. Cambreleng	Jacksonian	3rd	March 4, 1825 – March 3, 1837	Manhattan	?
Churchill C. Cambreleng	Democratic	3rd	March 4, 1837 – March 3, 1839	Manhattan	?
John H. Camp	Republican	26th	March 4, 1877 – March 3, 1883	Lyons	?
Felix Campbell	Democratic	4th	March 4, 1883 – March 3, 1885	Brooklyn	?
Felix Campbell	Democratic	2nd	March 4, 1885 – March 3, 1891	Brooklyn	?
Samuel Campbell	Democratic-Republican	15th	March 4, 1821 – March 3, 1823	Columbus	?
Timothy J. Campbell	Democratic	8th	March 4, 1885 – March 3, 1889	Manhattan	?
Timothy J. Campbell	Democratic	8th	March 4, 1891 – March 3, 1893	Manhattan	?
Timothy J. Campbell	Democratic	9th	March 4, 1893 – March 3, 1895	Manhattan	?
William W. Campbell	Know Nothing	6th	March 4, 1845 – March 3, 1847	Manhattan	?
Jacob A. Cantor	Democratic	20th	November 4, 1913 – March 3, 1915	Manhattan	?
Louis Capozzoli	Democratic	13th	January 3, 1941 – January 3, 1945	Manhattan	?
Bruce F. Caputo	Republican	23rd	January 3, 1977 – January 3, 1979	Yonkers	?
John F. Carew	Democratic	17th	March 4, 1913 – March 3, 1919	Manhattan	Resigned to become justice in New York Supreme Court.
John F. Carew	Democratic	18th	March 4, 1919 – December 28, 1929	Manhattan	Resigned to become justice in New York Supreme Court.
Hugh Carey	Democratic	12th	January 3, 1961 – January 3, 1963	Brooklyn	Resigned when elected Governor of New York.
Hugh Carey	Democratic	15th	January 3, 1963 – December 31, 1974	Brooklyn	Resigned when elected Governor of New York.
Patrick J. Carley	Democratic	8th	March 4, 1927 – January 3, 1935	Brooklyn	?
Gregory W. Carman	Republican	3rd	January 3, 1981 – January 3, 1983	Farmingdale	?
William Carney	Conservative	1st	January 3, 1979 – October 7, 1985	Hauppauge	?
William Carney	Republican	1st	October 7, 1985 – January 3, 1987	Hauppauge	?
Davis Carpenter	Whig	29th	November 8, 1853 – March 3, 1855	Brockport	Lost re-election.
Levi D. Carpenter	Democratic	20th	November 5, 1844 – March 3, 1845	Waterville	?
Charles H. Carroll	Whig	29th	March 4, 1843 – March 3, 1847	Groveland	?
John M. Carroll	Democratic	18th	March 4, 1871 – March 3, 1873	Johnstown	?
Luther C. Carter	Republican	1st	March 4, 1859 – March 3, 1861	Flushing	?
Jeremiah E. Cary	Democratic	21st	March 4, 1843 – March 3, 1845	Cherry Valley	?
Walter Case	Democratic-Republican	6th	December 4, 1819 – March 3, 1821	Newburgh	?
Emanuel Celler	Democratic	10th	March 4, 1923 – January 3, 1945	Brooklyn	?
Emanuel Celler	Democratic	15th	January 3, 1945 – January 3, 1953	Brooklyn	?
Emanuel Celler	Democratic	11th	January 3, 1953 – January 3, 1963	Brooklyn	?
Emanuel Celler	Democratic	10th	January 3, 1963 – January 3, 1973	Brooklyn	?
Jacob P. Chamberlain	Republican	26th	March 4, 1861 – March 3, 1863	Seneca Falls	?
Walter M. Chandler	Progressive	19th	March 4, 1913 – March 3, 1917	Manhattan	?
Walter M. Chandler	Republican	19th	March 4, 1921 – March 3, 1923	Manhattan	?
John Winthrop Chanler	Democratic	7th	March 4, 1863 – March 3, 1869	Manhattan	?
William A. Chanler	Democratic	14th	March 4, 1899 – March 3, 1901	Manhattan	?
Alfred C. Chapin	Democratic	2nd	November 3, 1891 – November 16, 1892	Brooklyn	Resigned.
Graham H. Chapin	Jacksonian	25th	March 4, 1835 – March 3, 1837	Lyons	?
William B. Charles	Republican	30th	March 4, 1915 – March 3, 1917	Amsterdam	?
George W. Chase	Whig	19th	March 4, 1853 – March 3, 1855	Schenevus	?
Samuel Chase	Anti-Jacksonian	13th	March 4, 1827 – March 3, 1829	Cooperstown	?
Charles A. Chickering	Republican	24th	March 4, 1893 – February 13, 1900	Copenhagen	Died.
Thomas Child Jr.	Whig	7th	March 4, 1855 – March 3, 1857	Manhattan	?
Timothy Childs	Anti-Masonic	27th	March 4, 1829 – March 3, 1831	Rochester	?
Timothy Childs	Anti-Jacksonian	28th	March 4, 1835 – March 3, 1837	Rochester	?
Timothy Childs	Whig	28th	March 4, 1837 – March 3, 1839	Rochester	?
Timothy Childs	Whig	28th	March 4, 1841 – March 3, 1843	Rochester	?
Shirley Chisholm	Democratic	12th	January 3, 1969 – January 3, 1983	Brooklyn	?
Simeon B. Chittenden	Independent Republican	3rd	November 3, 1874 – March 3, 1877	Brooklyn	?
Simeon B. Chittenden	Republican	3rd	March 4, 1877 – March 3, 1881	Brooklyn	?
Thomas C. Chittenden	Whig	18th	March 4, 1839 – March 3, 1843	Adams	?
John C. Churchill	Republican	22nd	March 4, 1867 – March 3, 1871	Oswego	?
John Michael Clancy	Democratic	4th	March 4, 1889 – March 3, 1893	Brooklyn	?
John Michael Clancy	Democratic	2nd	March 4, 1893 – March 3, 1895	Brooklyn	?
John R. Clancy	Democratic	35th	March 4, 1913 – March 3, 1915	Syracuse	?
Ambrose W. Clark	Republican	23rd	March 4, 1861 – March 3, 1863	Watertown	?
Ambrose W. Clark	Republican	20th	March 4, 1863 – March 3, 1865	Watertown	?
Horace F. Clark	Democratic	8th	March 4, 1857 – March 3, 1859	Manhattan	?
Horace F. Clark	Anti-Lecompton Democratic	8th	March 4, 1859 – March 3, 1861	Manhattan	?
John C. Clark	Jacksonian	21st	March 4, 1827 – March 3, 1829	Bainbridge	?
John C. Clark	Democratic	21st	March 4, 1837 – March 3, 1839	Bainbridge	?
John C. Clark	Whig	21st	March 4, 1839 – March 3, 1843	Bainbridge	?
Lot Clark	Democratic-Republican	21st	March 4, 1823 – March 3, 1825	Norwich	?
Robert Clark	Democratic-Republican	8th	March 4, 1819 – March 3, 1821	Delhi	?
Samuel Clark	Jacksonian	25th	March 4, 1833 – March 3, 1835	Waterloo	?
Archibald S. Clarke	Democratic-Republican	21st	December 2, 1816 – March 3, 1817	Clarence	?
Bayard Clarke	Opposition	9th	March 4, 1855 – March 3, 1857	Manhattan	?
Charles E. Clarke	Whig	19th	March 4, 1849 – March 3, 1851	Great Bend	?
Freeman Clarke	Republican	28th	March 4, 1863 – March 3, 1865	Rochester	?
Freeman Clarke	Republican	28th	March 4, 1871 – March 3, 1873	Rochester	?
Freeman Clarke	Republican	29th	March 4, 1873 – March 3, 1875	Rochester	?
John D. Clarke	Republican	34th	March 4, 1927 – November 5, 1933	Fraser	Died.
Marian W. Clarke	Republican	34th	December 28, 1933 – January 3, 1935	Fraser	?
Staley N. Clarke	Whig	31st	March 4, 1841 – March 3, 1843	Ellicottville	?
Yvette Clarke	Democratic	11th	January 3, 2007 – January 3, 2013	Brooklyn	Elected in 2006. Incumbent
Yvette Clarke	Democratic	9th	January 3, 2013 – present	Brooklyn	Elected in 2006. Incumbent
Bertram Tracy Clayton	Democratic	4th	March 4, 1899 – March 3, 1901	Brooklyn	?
William E. Cleary	Democratic	8th	March 5, 1918 – March 3, 1921	Brooklyn	?
William E. Cleary	Democratic	8th	March 4, 1923 – March 3, 1927	Brooklyn	?
L. Gary Clemente	Democratic	4th	January 3, 1949 – January 3, 1953	Ozone Park	?
George Clinton Jr.	Democratic-Republican	3rd	February 14, 1805 – March 3, 1805	Manhattan	?
George Clinton Jr.	Democratic-Republican	2nd and 3rd	March 4, 1805 – March 3, 1809	Manhattan	?
James G. Clinton	Democratic	6th	March 4, 1841 – March 3, 1843	Newburgh	?
James G. Clinton	Democratic	9th	March 4, 1843 – March 3, 1845	Newburgh	?
E. Harold Cluett	Republican	29th	January 3, 1937 – January 3, 1943	Troy	?
James Cochran	Federalist	10th	March 4, 1797 – March 3, 1799	?	?
Aaron Van Schaick Cochrane	Republican	19th	March 4, 1897 – March 3, 1901	Hudson	?
Clark B. Cochrane	Republican	18th	March 4, 1857 – March 3, 1861	Schenectady	?
John Cochrane	Democratic	6th	March 4, 1857 – March 3, 1861	Manhattan	?
William Bourke Cockran	Democratic	12th	March 4, 1887 – March 3, 1889	Manhattan	?
William Bourke Cockran	Democratic	10th	November 3, 1891 – March 3, 1893	Manhattan	?
William Bourke Cockran	Democratic	12th	March 4, 1893 – March 3, 1895	Manhattan	?
William Bourke Cockran	Democratic	12th	February 23, 1904 – March 3, 1909	Manhattan	?
William Bourke Cockran	Democratic	16th	March 4, 1921 – March 1, 1923	Manhattan	Died.
William W. Cocks	Republican	1st	March 4, 1905 – March 3, 1911	Westbury	?
William W. Cohen	Democratic	17th	March 4, 1927 – March 3, 1929	Manhattan	?
Cadwallader D. Colden	Federalist	1st	December 12, 1821 – March 3, 1823	Manhattan	Successfully challenged the election of Peter Sharpe to the 17th Congress.
W. Sterling Cole	Republican	37th	January 3, 1935 – January 3, 1945	Bath	Resigned to head the International Atomic Energy Agency.
W. Sterling Cole	Republican	39th	January 3, 1945 – January 3, 1953	Bath	Resigned to head the International Atomic Energy Agency.
W. Sterling Cole	Republican	37th	January 3, 1953 – December 1, 1957	Bath	Resigned to head the International Atomic Energy Agency.
John A. Collier	Anti-Masonic	21st	March 4, 1831 – March 3, 1833	Binghamton	Lost re-election.
John F. Collin	Democratic	11th	March 4, 1845 – March 3, 1847	Hillsdale	?
Chris Collins	Republican	27th	January 3, 2013 – October 1, 2019	Clarence	?
Ela Collins	Democratic-Republican	20th	March 4, 1823 – March 3, 1825	Lowville	?
William Collins	Democratic	18th	March 4, 1847 – March 3, 1849	Lowville	?
Oliver C. Comstock	Democratic-Republican	20th	March 4, 1813 – March 3, 1819	Trumansburg	?
Barber Conable	Republican	37th	January 3, 1965 – January 3, 1973	Alexander	?
Barber Conable	Republican	35th	January 3, 1973 – January 3, 1983	Alexander	?
Barber Conable	Republican	30th	January 3, 1983 – January 3, 1985	Alexander	?
Harmon S. Conger	Whig	25th	March 4, 1847 – March 3, 1851	Cortland	?
Alfred Conkling	Democratic-Republican	14th	March 4, 1821 – March 3, 1823	Canajoharie	?
Frederick A. Conkling	Republican	6th	March 4, 1861 – March 3, 1863	Manhattan	?
Roscoe Conkling	Republican	20th	March 4, 1859 – March 3, 1863	Utica	?
Roscoe Conkling	Republican	21st	March 4, 1865 – March 3, 1867	Utica	Resigned when elected to the U.S. Senate.
Richard E. Connell	Democratic	21st	March 4, 1911 – October 30, 1912	Poughkeepsie	Died.
Michael F. Conry	Democratic	12th	March 4, 1909 – March 3, 1913	Manhattan	Died.
Michael F. Conry	Democratic	15th	March 4, 1913 – March 2, 1917	Manhattan	Died.
Bates Cooke	Anti-Masonic	30th	March 4, 1831 – March 3, 1833	Lewiston	?
Edmund F. Cooke	Republican	41st	March 4, 1929 – March 3, 1933	Alden	?
Thomas B. Cooke	Democratic-Republican	5th	March 4, 1811 – March 3, 1813	Catskill	?
William J. Coombs	Democratic	3rd	March 4, 1891 – March 3, 1893	Brooklyn	?
William J. Coombs	Democratic	4th	March 4, 1893 – March 3, 1895	Brooklyn	?
William Cooper	Federalist	10th	March 4, 1795 – March 3, 1797	?	?
William Cooper	Federalist	10th	March 4, 1799 – March 3, 1801	?	?
Thomas Cornell	Republican	13th	March 4, 1867 – March 3, 1869	Rondout	?
Thomas Cornell	Republican	15th	March 4, 1881 – March 3, 1883	Rondout	?
Erastus Corning	Democratic	14th	March 4, 1857 – March 3, 1859	Albany	?
Erastus Corning	Democratic	14th	March 4, 1861 – October 5, 1863	Albany	Resigned.
Parker Corning	Democratic	28th	March 4, 1923 – January 3, 1937	Albany	?
Frederic René Coudert Jr.	Republican	17th	January 3, 1947 – January 3, 1959	Manhattan	?
James W. Covert	Democratic	1st	March 4, 1877 – March 3, 1881	Long Island City	?
James W. Covert	Democratic	1st	March 4, 1889 – March 3, 1895	Long Island City	?
George W. Cowles	Republican	24th	March 4, 1869 – March 3, 1871	Clyde	?
Henry B. Cowles	Anti-Jacksonian	4th	March 4, 1829 – March 3, 1831	Carmel	?
Isaac N. Cox	Democratic	17th	March 4, 1891 – March 3, 1893	Ellenville	?
Samuel S. Cox	Democratic	6th	March 4, 1869 – March 3, 1873	Manhattan	?
Samuel S. Cox	Democratic	6th	November 4, 1873 – March 3, 1885	Manhattan	Resigned to become U.S. Envoy Extraordinary and Minister Plenipotentiary to the Ottoman Empire.
Samuel S. Cox	Democratic	8th	March 4, 1885 – May 20, 1885	Manhattan	Resigned to become U.S. Envoy Extraordinary and Minister Plenipotentiary to the Ottoman Empire.
Samuel S. Cox	Democratic	9th	November 2, 1886 – September 10, 1889	Manhattan	Died.
Hector Craig	Democratic-Republican	6th	March 4, 1823 – March 3, 1825	Chester	?
Hector Craig	Jacksonian	6th	March 4, 1829 – July 12, 1830	Chester	Resigned.
John Cramer	Jacksonian	11th	March 4, 1833 – March 3, 1837	Waterford	?
Thomas J. Creamer	Democratic	7th	March 4, 1873 – March 3, 1875	Manhattan	?
Thomas J. Creamer	Democratic	8th	March 4, 1901 – March 3, 1903	Manhattan	?
Henry Crocheron	Democratic-Republican	1st	March 4, 1815 – March 3, 1817	Castletown	?
Jacob Crocheron	Jacksonian	2nd	March 4, 1829 – March 3, 1831	Smithfield	?
Philip S. Crooke	Republican	4th	March 4, 1873 – March 3, 1875	Flatbrush	?
Joe Crowley	Democratic	7th	January 3, 1999 – January 3, 2013	Elmhurst	?
Joe Crowley	Democratic	14th	January 3, 2013 – January 3, 2019	Elmhurst	Lost re-election.
Richard Crowley	Republican	31st	March 4, 1879 – March 3, 1883	Lockport	?
Frank Crowther	Republican	30th	March 4, 1919 – January 3, 1943	Schenectady	?
Daniel Cruger	Democratic-Republican	20th	March 4, 1817 – March 3, 1819	Bath	?
Francis D. Culkin	Republican	32nd	November 6, 1928 – August 4, 1943	Oswego	Died.
Thomas H. Cullen	Democratic	4th	June 6, 1919 – March 1, 1944	Brooklyn	?
Erastus D. Culver	Whig	14th	March 4, 1845 – March 3, 1847	Greenwich	?
Thomas W. Cumming	Democratic	2nd	March 4, 1853 – March 3, 1855	Brooklyn	?
Amos J. Cummings	Democratic	6th	March 4, 1887 – March 3, 1889	Manhattan	?
Amos J. Cummings	Democratic	9th	November 5, 1889 – March 3, 1893	Manhattan	?
Amos J. Cummings	Democratic	11th	March 4, 1893 – March 3, 1895	Manhattan	?
Amos J. Cummings	Democratic	10th	November 5, 1895 – May 2, 1902	Manhattan	Died.
Edward W. Curley	Democratic	22nd	November 5, 1935 – January 6, 1940	Bronx	Died.
Edward Curtis	Whig	3rd	March 4, 1837 – March 3, 1841	Manhattan	?
Newton Martin Curtis	Republican	22nd	November 3, 1891 – March 3, 1897	Odgensburg	?
John P. Cushman	Federalist	10th	March 4, 1817 – March 3, 1819	Troy	?
Francis B. Cutting	Democratic	8th	March 4, 1853 – March 3, 1855	Manhattan	?
Anthony D'Esposito	Republican	4th	January 3, 2023 – January 3, 2025	Island Park	Lost re-election to Gillen.
Harry H. Dale	Democratic	4th	March 4, 1913 – January 6, 1919	Brooklyn	Resigned to become judge of magistrate court.
Amasa Dana	Democratic	22nd	March 4, 1839 – March 3, 1841	Ithaca	?
Amasa Dana	Democratic	26th	March 4, 1843 – March 3, 1845	Ithaca	?
Henry G. Danforth	Republican	32nd	March 4, 1911 – March 3, 1913	Rochester	?
Henry G. Danforth	Republican	39th	March 4, 1913 – March 3, 1917	Rochester	?
Charles Daniels	Republican	33rd	March 4, 1893 – March 3, 1897	Buffalo	?
William Augustus Darling	Republican	9th	March 4, 1865 – March 3, 1867	Manhattan	?
Frederick M. Davenport	Republican	33rd	March 4, 1925 – March 3, 1933	Clinton	?
Ira Davenport	Republican	29th	March 4, 1885 – March 3, 1889	Bath	?
Irwin D. Davidson	Liberal	20th	January 3, 1955 – December 31, 1956	Manhattan	Resigned when elected judge of Court of General Sessions for New York County.
John C. Davies II	Democratic	35th	January 3, 1949 – January 3, 1951	Utica	?
Noah Davis	Republican	28th	March 4, 1869 – July 15, 1870	Albion	resigned after becoming United States Attorney for the Southern District of New York
Richard D. Davis	Democratic	5th	March 4, 1841 – March 3, 1843	Poughkeepsie	?
Richard D. Davis	Democratic	8th	March 4, 1843 – March 3, 1845	Poughkeepsie	?
Thomas Treadwell Davis	Union	23rd	March 4, 1863 – March 3, 1865	Syracuse	?
Thomas Treadwell Davis	Republican	23rd	March 4, 1865 – March 3, 1867	Syracuse	?
John M. Davy	Republican	30th	March 4, 1875 – March 3, 1877	Rochester	?
Rowland Day	Democratic-Republican	24th	March 4, 1823 – March 3, 1825	Sempronius	?
Rowland Day	Jacksonian	24th	March 4, 1833 – March 3, 1835	Sempronius	?
Charles Dayan	Jacksonian	20th	March 4, 1831 – March 3, 1833	Lowville	?
Henry S. De Forest	Republican	23rd	March 4, 1911 – March 3, 1913	Schenectady	?
John I. De Graff	Jacksonian	12th	March 4, 1827 – March 3, 1829	Schenectady	?
John I. De Graff	Democratic	11th	March 4, 1837 – March 3, 1839	Schenectady	?
James De La Montanya	Democratic	2nd	March 4, 1839 – March 3, 1841	Haverstraw	?
Milton De Lano	Republican	26th	March 4, 1887 – March 3, 1891	Canastota	?
John De Mott	Democratic	27th	March 4, 1845 – March 3, 1847	Lodi	?
Charles G. DeWitt	Jacksonian	7th	March 4, 1829 – March 3, 1831	Kingston	?
David M. De Witt	Democratic	14th	March 4, 1873 – March 3, 1875	Kingston	?
Jacob H. De Witt	Democratic-Republican	7th	March 4, 1819 – March 3, 1821	Kingston	?
Gilbert Dean	Democratic	8th	March 4, 1851 – March 3, 1853	Poughkeepsie	Resigned to become justice to Supreme Court of New York.
Gilbert Dean	Democratic	12th	March 4, 1853 – July 3, 1854	Poughkeepsie	Resigned to become justice to Supreme Court of New York.
James J. Delaney	Democratic	6th	January 3, 1945 – January 3, 1947	Long Island City	?
James J. Delaney	Democratic	6th	January 3, 1949 – January 3, 1953	Long Island City	Resigned.
James J. Delaney	Democratic	7th	January 3, 1953 – January 3, 1963	Long Island City	Resigned.
James J. Delaney	Democratic	9th	January 3, 1963 – December 31, 1978	Long Island City	Resigned.
John J. Delaney	Democratic	7th	March 5, 1918 – March 3, 1919	Brooklyn	?
John J. Delaney	Democratic	7th	November 3, 1931 – November 18, 1948	Brooklyn	Died.
Isaac C. Delaplaine	Democratic	8th	March 4, 1861 – March 3, 1863	Manhattan	?
Antonio Delgado	Democratic	19th	January 3, 2019 – May 25, 2022	Rhinebeck	Resigned to become Lieutenant Governor of New York
S. Wallace Dempsey	Republican	40th	March 4, 1915 – March 3, 1931	Lockport	?
Peter Denoyelles	Democratic-Republican	3rd	March 4, 1813 – March 3, 1815	Haverstraw	?
Steven Derounian	Republican	2nd	January 3, 1953 – January 3, 1963	Roslyn	?
Steven Derounian	Republican	3rd	January 3, 1963 – January 3, 1965	Roslyn	?
John Dean Dickinson	Federalist	10th	March 4, 1819 – March 3, 1823	Troy	?
John Dean Dickinson	Anti-Jacksonian	9th	March 4, 1827 – March 3, 1829	Troy	?
John Dean Dickinson	Anti-Jacksonian	9th	March 4, 1829 – March 3, 1831	Troy	?
John Dickson	Anti-Masonic	26th	March 4, 1831 – March 3, 1835	West Bloomfield	?
Samuel Dickson	Opposition	14th	March 4, 1855 – March 3, 1857	New Scotland	?
Samuel Dickstein	Democratic	12th	March 4, 1923 – January 3, 1945	Manhattan	Resigned to become justice on New York Supreme Court.
Samuel Dickstein	Democratic	19th	January 3, 1945 – December 30, 1945	Manhattan	Resigned to become justice on New York Supreme Court.
William Dietz	Jacksonian	12th	March 4, 1825 – March 3, 1827	Schoharie	?
Joe DioGuardi	Republican	20th	January 3, 1985 – January 3, 1989	Scarsdale	?
Alexander S. Diven	Republican	27th	March 4, 1861 – March 3, 1863	Elmira	?
Edward Dodd	Opposition	15th	March 4, 1855 – March 3, 1857	Argyle	?
Edward Dodd	Republican	15th	March 4, 1857 – March 3, 1859	Argyle	?
William E. Dodge	Republican	8th	April 7, 1866 – March 3, 1867	Manhattan	?
Nicholas B. Doe	Whig	11th	December 7, 1840 – March 3, 1841	Waterford	?
Andrew W. Doig	Democratic	16th	March 4, 1839 – March 3, 1843	Lowville	?
Isidore Dollinger	Democratic	24th	January 3, 1949 – January 3, 1953	Manhattan	Resigned.
Isidore Dollinger	Democratic	23rd	January 3, 1953 – December 31, 1959	Manhattan	Resigned.
Dan Donovan	Republican	11th	May 5, 2015 – January 3, 2019	Great Kills, Staten Island	Lost re-election.
James G. Donovan	Democratic	18th	January 3, 1951 – January 3, 1957	Manhattan	?
Jerome F. Donovan	Democratic	21st	March 5, 1918 – March 3, 1921	New York City	Lost re-election.
Edwin B. Dooley	Republican	26th	January 3, 1957 – January 3, 1963	Mamaroneck	?
Peter J. Dooling	Democratic	16th	March 4, 1913 – March 3, 1919	Manhattan	?
Peter J. Dooling	Democratic	15th	March 4, 1919 – March 3, 1921	Manhattan	?
Francis E. Dorn	Republican	12th	January 3, 1953 – January 3, 1961	Brooklyn	?
William Dorsheimer	Democratic	7th	March 4, 1883 – March 3, 1885	Manhattan	?
Ulysses F. Doubleday	Jacksonian	24th	March 4, 1831 – March 3, 1833	Auburn	?
Ulysses F. Doubleday	Jacksonian	24th	March 4, 1835 – March 3, 1837	Auburn	?
Fred J. Douglas	Republican	2nd	January 3, 1937 – January 3, 1945	Utica	?
William H. Douglas	Republican	14th	March 4, 1901 – March 3, 1903	Manhattan	?
William H. Douglas	Republican	15th	March 4, 1903 – March 3, 1905	Manhattan	?
John G. Dow	Democratic	27th	January 3, 1965 – January 3, 1969	Grand View	?
John G. Dow	Democratic	27th	January 3, 1971 – January 3, 1973	Grand View	?
Abraham Dowdney	Democratic	12th	March 4, 1885 – December 10, 1886	Manhattan	Died.
Thomas Downey	Democratic	2nd	January 3, 1975 – January 3, 1993	West Islip	?
John R. Drake	Democratic-Republican	15th	March 4, 1817 – March 3, 1819	Owego	?
William Henry Draper	Republican	19th	March 4, 1901 – March 3, 1903	Troy	?
William Henry Draper	Republican	22nd	March 4, 1903 – March 3, 1913	Troy	?
Edmund H. Driggs	Democratic	3rd	December 6, 1897 – March 3, 1901	Brooklyn	?
Daniel A. Driscoll	Democratic	35th	March 4, 1909 – March 3, 1913	Buffalo	?
Daniel A. Driscoll	Democratic	42nd	March 4, 1913 – March 3, 1917	Buffalo	?
Michael E. Driscoll	Republican	27th	March 4, 1899 – March 3, 1903	Syracuse	?
Michael E. Driscoll	Republican	29th	March 4, 1903 – March 3, 1913	Syracuse	?
R. Holland Duell	Republican	21st	March 4, 1859 – March 3, 1863	Cortland	?
R. Holland Duell	Republican	23rd	March 4, 1871 – March 3, 1873	Cortland	?
R. Holland Duell	Republican	24th	March 4, 1873 – March 3, 1875	Cortland	?
William Duer	Whig	23rd	March 4, 1847 – March 3, 1851	Oswego	?
James P.B. Duffy	Democratic	38th	January 3, 1935 – January 3, 1937	Rochester	?
P. Henry Dugro	Democratic	7th	March 4, 1881 – March 3, 1883	Manhattan	?
Thaddeus J. Dulski	Democratic	41st	January 3, 1959 – January 3, 1973	Buffalo	Resigned.
Thaddeus J. Dulski	Democratic	37th	January 3, 1973 – December 31, 1974	Buffalo	Resigned.
Thomas B. Dunn	Republican	38th	March 4, 1913 – March 3, 1923	Rochester	?
Edward J. Dunphy	Democratic	7th	March 4, 1889 – March 3, 1893	Manhattan	?
Edward J. Dunphy	Democratic	8th	March 4, 1893 – March 3, 1895	Manhattan	?
Charles T. Dunwell	Republican	3rd	March 4, 1903 – June 12, 1908	Brooklyn	Died.
Cyrus Durey	Republican	25th	March 4, 1907 – March 3, 1911	Johnstown	?
Jeremiah W. Dwight	Republican	28th	March 4, 1877 – March 3, 1883	Dryden	?
John Wilbur Dwight	Republican	26th	November 4, 1902 – March 3, 1903	Dryden	?
John Wilbur Dwight	Republican	30th	March 4, 1903 – March 3, 1913	Dryden	?
Justin Dwinell	Democratic-Republican	22nd	March 4, 1823 – March 3, 1825	Cazenovia	?
Samuel W. Eager	Anti-Jacksonian	6th	December 6, 1830 – March 3, 1831	Montgomery	?
Jonas Earll Jr.	Jacksonian	23rd	March 4, 1827 – March 3, 1831	Onondaga	?
Nehemiah H. Earll	Democratic	23rd	March 4, 1839 – March 3, 1841	Syracuse	?
Lewis Eaton	Democratic-Republican	12th	March 4, 1823 – March 3, 1825	Duanesburg	?
Fred J. Eckert	Republican	30th	January 3, 1985 – January 3, 1987	Rochester	?
Morris Michael Edelstein	Democratic	14th	February 6, 1940 – June 4, 1941	Manhattan	Died.
Francis S. Edwards	Know Nothing	33rd	March 4, 1855 – February 28, 1857	Fredonia	Resigned.
John Edwards	Democratic	15th	March 4, 1837 – March 3, 1839	Ephratah	?
Valentine Efner	Jacksonian	8th	March 4, 1835 – March 3, 1837	Jefferson	?
Joseph Egbert	Democratic	2nd	March 4, 1841 – March 3, 1843	Tompkinsville	?
Anthony Eickhoff	Democratic	7th	March 4, 1877 – March 3, 1879	Manhattan	?
Edwin Einstein	Republican	7th	March 4, 1879 – March 3, 1881	Manhattan	?
Benjamin Ellicott	Democratic-Republican	21st	March 4, 1817 – March 3, 1819	Batavia	?
Chesselden Ellis	Democratic	16th	March 4, 1843 – March 3, 1845	Waterford	?
Samuel S. Ellsworth	Democratic	26th	March 4, 1845 – March 3, 1847	Penn Yan	?
Lucas Elmendorf	Democratic-Republican	4th	March 4, 1797 – March 3, 1803	Kingston	?
Edward J. Elsaesser	Republican	43rd	January 3, 1945 – January 3, 1949	Buffalo	?
Alfred Ely	Republican	29th	March 4, 1859 – March 3, 1863	Rochester	?
John Ely	Democratic	8th	March 4, 1839 – March 3, 1841	Coxsackie	?
Smith Ely Jr.	Democratic	7th	March 4, 1871 – March 3, 1873	Manhattan	Resigned to become Mayor of New York City.
Smith Ely Jr.	Democratic	7th	March 4, 1875 – December 11, 1876	Manhattan	Resigned to become Mayor of New York City.
Louis W. Emerson	Republican	23rd	March 4, 1899 – March 3, 1903	Warrensburg	?
James Emott	Federalist	4th	March 4, 1809 – March 3, 1813	Albany	?
Eliot Engel	Democratic	19th	January 3, 1989 – January 3, 1993	The Bronx	Lost re-nomination to Bowman
Eliot Engel	Democratic	17th	January 3, 1993 – January 3, 2013	The Bronx	Lost re-nomination to Bowman
Eliot Engel	Democratic	16th	January 3, 2013 – January 3, 2021	The Bronx	Lost re-nomination to Bowman
Adriano Espaillat	Democratic	13th	January 3, 2017 – present	Manhattan	Incumbent
David Ellicott Evans	Jacksonian	29th	March 4, 1827 – May 2, 1827	Batavia	Resigned.
Marcellus H. Evans	Democratic	5th	January 3, 1935 – January 3, 1941	Brooklyn	?
Benjamin L. Fairchild	Republican	16th	March 4, 1895 – March 3, 1897	Pelham	?
Benjamin L. Fairchild	Republican	24th	March 4, 1917 – March 3, 1919	Pelham	?
Benjamin L. Fairchild	Republican	24th	March 4, 1921 – March 3, 1923	Pelham	?
Benjamin L. Fairchild	Republican	24th	November 6, 1923 – March 3, 1927	Pelham	?
George Winthrop Fairchild	Republican	24th	March 4, 1907 – March 3, 1913	Oneonta	?
George Winthrop Fairchild	Republican	34th	March 4, 1913 – March 3, 1919	Oneonta	?
Leonard Farbstein	Democratic	19th	January 3, 1957 – January 3, 1971	Manhattan	?
Michael F. Farley	Democratic	14th	March 4, 1915 – March 3, 1917	Manhattan	?
Dudley Farlin	Jacksonian	13th	March 4, 1835 – March 3, 1837	Warrensburg	?
John M. Farquhar	Republican	32nd	March 4, 1885 – March 3, 1891	Buffalo	?
John Faso	Republican	19th	January 3, 2017 – January 3, 2019	Kinderhook	Lost re-election.
Jacob Sloat Fassett	Republican	33rd	March 4, 1905 – March 3, 1911	Elmira	?
James H. Fay	Democratic	16th	January 3, 1939 – January 3, 1941	Manhattan	?
James H. Fay	Democratic	16th	January 3, 1943 – January 3, 1945	Manhattan	?
John Fay	Democratic-Republican	14th	March 4, 1819 – March 3, 1821	Northampton	?
John R. Fellows	Democratic	6th	March 4, 1891 – March 3, 1893	Manhattan	Resigned to become District Attorney for New York City.
John R. Fellows	Democratic	14th	March 4, 1893 – December 31, 1893	Manhattan	Resigned to become District Attorney for New York City.
Reuben Fenton	Democratic	33rd	March 4, 1853 – March 3, 1855	Frewsburg	?
Reuben Fenton	Republican	33rd	March 4, 1857 – March 3, 1863	Frewsburg	Resigned when elected Governor of New York.
Reuben Fenton	Republican	31st	March 4, 1863 – December 20, 1864	Frewsburg	Resigned when elected Governor of New York.
John W. Ferdon	Republican	14th	March 4, 1879 – March 3, 1881	Piermont	?
Geraldine Ferraro	Democratic	9th	January 3, 1979 – January 3, 1985	Forest Hills	Retired to run for U.S. Vice President
Charles G. Ferris	Jacksonian	3rd	December 1, 1834 – March 3, 1835	Manhattan	?
Charles G. Ferris	Democratic	3rd	March 4, 1841 – March 3, 1843	Manhattan	?
Orange Ferriss	Republican	16th	December 3, 1867 – March 3, 1871	Glens Falls	?
David Dudley Field II	Democratic	7th	January 11, 1877 – March 3, 1877	Manhattan	?
William C. Fields	Republican	19th	March 4, 1867 – March 3, 1869	Laurens	?
Millard Fillmore	Whig	32nd	March 4, 1833 – March 3, 1835	Buffalo	?
Millard Fillmore	Whig	32nd	March 4, 1837 – March 3, 1843	Buffalo	?
Isaac Finch	Anti-Jacksonian	19th	March 4, 1829 – March 3, 1831	Jay	?
John Fine	Democratic	14th	March 4, 1839 – March 3, 1841	Ogdensburg	?
Sidney A. Fine	Democratic	23rd	January 3, 1951 – January 3, 1953	Manhattan	Resigned to serve on the New York Supreme Court.
Sidney A. Fine	Democratic	22nd	January 3, 1953 – January 2, 1956	Manhattan	Resigned to serve on the New York Supreme Court.
Paul A. Fino	Republican	25th	January 3, 1953 – January 3, 1963	Manhattan	Resigned when elected justice to the New York Supreme Court.
Paul A. Fino	Republican	24th	January 3, 1963 – December 31, 1968	Manhattan	Resigned when elected justice to the New York Supreme Court.
Israel F. Fischer	Republican	4th	March 4, 1895 – March 3, 1899	Brooklyn	?
Hamilton Fish	Whig	6th	March 4, 1843 – March 3, 1845	Manhattan	?
Hamilton Fish II	Republican	21st	March 4, 1909 – March 3, 1911	Garrison	Lost re-election.
Hamilton Fish III	Republican	26th	November 2, 1920 – January 3, 1945	Garrison	?
Hamilton Fish IV	Republican	28th	January 3, 1969 – January 3, 1973	Millbrook	?
Hamilton Fish IV	Republican	25th	January 3, 1973 – January 3, 1983	Millbrook	?
Hamilton Fish IV	Republican	21st	January 3, 1983 – January 3, 1993	Millbrook	?
Hamilton Fish IV	Republican	19th	January 3, 1993 – January 3, 1995	Millbrook	?
George Fisher	Anti-Jacksonian	20th	March 4, 1829 – February 5, 1830	Oswego	Lost contested election.
John Fisher	Republican	29th	March 4, 1869 – March 3, 1871	Batavia	?
Jonathan Fisk	Democratic-Republican	3rd	March 4, 1809 – March 3, 1811	Newburgh	?
Jonathan Fisk	Democratic-Republican	6th	March 4, 1813 – March 21, 1815	Newburgh	Resigned to become US Attorney.
Asa Fitch	Federalist	6th	March 4, 1811 – March 3, 1813	Salem	?
Ashbel P. Fitch	Republican	13th	March 4, 1887 – March 3, 1889	Manhattan	?
Ashbel P. Fitch	Democratic	13th	March 4, 1893 – December 26, 1893	Manhattan	Resigned to become New York City Comptroller.
Frank T. Fitzgerald	Democratic	6th	March 4, 1889 – November 4, 1889	Manhattan	Resigned when elected register of New York County.
John J. Fitzgerald	Democratic	2nd	March 4, 1899 – March 3, 1903	Brooklyn	Resigned.
John J. Fitzgerald	Democratic	7th	March 4, 1903 – December 31, 1917	Brooklyn	Resigned.
John Fitzgibbons	Democratic	At-large	March 4, 1933 – January 3, 1935	Oswego	?
James M. Fitzpatrick	Democratic	24th	March 4, 1927 – January 3, 1945	Manhattan	?
William H. Flack	Republican	26th	March 4, 1903 – February 2, 1907	Malone	Died.
Thomas T. Flagler	Whig	31st	March 4, 1853 – March 3, 1855	Lockport	?
Thomas T. Flagler	Opposition	31st	March 4, 1855 – March 3, 1857	Lockport	?
Floyd Flake	Democratic	6th	January 3, 1987 – November 17, 1997	Queens	Resigned.
Thomas S. Flood	Republican	28th	March 4, 1887 – March 3, 1891	Elmira	?
Roswell P. Flower	Democratic	11th	November 8, 1881 – March 3, 1883	Manhattan	?
Roswell P. Flower	Democratic	12th	March 4, 1889 – September 16, 1891	Manhattan	Resigned to become Governor of New York.
Charles A. Floyd	Democratic	1st	March 4, 1841 – March 3, 1843	Commack	?
John G. Floyd	Democratic	17th	March 4, 1839 – March 3, 1843	Utica	?
John G. Floyd	Democratic	1st	March 4, 1851 – March 3, 1853	Utica	?
William Floyd	Anti-Administration	1st	March 4, 1789 – March 3, 1791	Brookhaven	Lost re-election.
Joseph V. Flynn	Democratic	3rd	March 4, 1915 – March 3, 1919	Brooklyn	?
Otto G. Foelker	Republican	3rd	November 3, 1908 – March 3, 1911	Brooklyn	?
Charles A. Foote	Democratic-Republican	11th	March 4, 1823 – March 3, 1825	Delhi	?
Wallace T. Foote Jr.	Republican	23rd	March 4, 1895 – March 3, 1899	Port Henry	?
Michael Forbes	Republican	1st	January 3, 1995 – July 17, 1999	Quogue	?
Michael Forbes	Democratic	1st	July 17, 1999 – January 3, 2001	Quogue	?
William Donnison Ford	Democratic-Republican	18th	March 4, 1819 – March 3, 1821	Watertown	?
Charles V. Fornes	Democratic	11th	March 4, 1907 – March 3, 1913	Manhattan	?
Nicoll Fosdick	Anti-Jacksonian	20th	March 4, 1825 – March 3, 1827	Morristown	?
Vito Fossella	Republican	13th	November 4, 1997 – January 3, 2009	Staten Island	?
A. Lawrence Foster	Whig	23rd	March 4, 1841 – March 3, 1843	Morrisville	?
Henry A. Foster	Democratic	17th	March 4, 1837 – March 3, 1839	Rome	?
John Fox	Democratic	4th	March 4, 1867 – March 3, 1871	Manhattan	?
Richard Franchot	Republican	19th	March 4, 1861 – March 3, 1863	Schenectady	?
George B. Francis	Republican	18th	March 4, 1917 – March 3, 1919	Manhattan	?
Augustus Frank	Republican	30th	March 4, 1859 – March 3, 1863	Warsaw	?
Augustus Frank	Republican	29th	March 4, 1863 – March 3, 1865	Warsaw	?
Dan Frisa	Republican	4th	January 3, 1995 – January 3, 1997	Westbury	?
Joel Frost	Democratic-Republican	4th	March 4, 1823 – March 3, 1825	Carmel	?
Hadwen C. Fuller	Republican	32nd	November 2, 1943 – January 3, 1945	Parish	?
Hadwen C. Fuller	Republican	35th	January 3, 1945 – January 3, 1949	Parish	?
Philo C. Fuller	Anti-Masonic	30th	March 4, 1833 – March 3, 1835	Genesco	Resigned.
Philo C. Fuller	Anti-Jacksonian	30th	March 4, 1835 – September 2, 1836	Genesco	Resigned.
William K. Fuller	Jacksonian	23rd	March 4, 1833 – March 3, 1837	Chittenango	?
Albert Gallup	Democratic	10th	March 4, 1837 – March 3, 1839	East Berne	?
Ralph A. Gamble	Republican	25th	November 2, 1937 – January 3, 1945	Larchmont	?
Ralph A. Gamble	Republican	28th	January 3, 1945 – January 3, 1953	Larchmont	?
Ralph A. Gamble	Republican	26th	January 3, 1953 – January 3, 1957	Larchmont	?
James V. Ganly	Democratic	24th	March 4, 1919 – March 3, 1921	Manhattan	?
James V. Ganly	Democratic	24th	March 4, 1923 – September 7, 1923	Manhattan	Died.
John Ganson	Democratic	30th	March 4, 1863 – March 3, 1865	Buffalo	?
Andrew Garbarino	Republican	2nd	January 3, 2021 – present	Sayville	Incumbent
Robert García	Democratic	21st	February 21, 1978 – January 3, 1983	Bronx	Resigned because of corruptions.
Robert García	Democratic	18th	January 3, 1983 – January 7, 1990	Bronx	Resigned because of corruptions.
Barent Gardenier	Federalist	7th	March 4, 1807 – March 3, 1809	Kingston	?
Barent Gardenier	Federalist	5th	March 4, 1809 – March 3, 1811	Kingston	?
Daniel G. Garnsey	Anti-Jacksonian	30th	March 4, 1825 – March 3, 1829	Fredonia	?
Nathaniel Garrow	Jacksonian	24th	March 4, 1827 – March 3, 1829	Auburn	?
Seth M. Gates	Whig	29th	March 4, 1839 – March 3, 1843	Le Roy	?
Joseph A. Gavagan	Democratic	21st	November 5, 1929 – December 30, 1943	Manhattan	Resigned when elected justice of New York Supreme Court.
John Gebhard	Federalist	13th	March 4, 1821 – March 3, 1823	Schoharie	?
James Geddes	Federalist	19th	March 4, 1813 – March 3, 1815	Onondaga	?
Henry George Jr.	Democratic	17th	March 4, 1911 – March 3, 1913	Manhattan	?
Henry George Jr.	Democratic	21st	March 4, 1913 – March 3, 1915	Manhattan	?
Chris Gibson	Republican	20th	January 3, 2011 – January 3, 2013	Kinderhook	?
Chris Gibson	Republican	19th	January 3, 2013 – January 3, 2017	Kinderhook	?
Ezekiel Gilbert	Pro-Administration	6th	March 4, 1793 – March 3, 1795	Hudson	?
Ezekiel Gilbert	Federalist	6th	March 4, 1795 – March 3, 1797	Hudson	?
Jacob H. Gilbert	Democratic	23rd	March 8, 1960 – January 3, 1963	Bronx	Lost re-election.
Jacob H. Gilbert	Democratic	22nd	January 3, 1963 – January 3, 1971	Bronx	Lost re-election.
William A. Gilbert	Opposition	23rd	March 4, 1855 – February 27, 1857	Adams	Resigned.
Laura Gillen	Democratic	4th	January 3, 2025 – present	Rockville Centre	Incumbent
Charles W. Gillet	Republican	29th	March 4, 1893 – March 3, 1903	Addison	?
Charles W. Gillet	Republican	33rd	March 4, 1903 – March 3, 1905	Addison	?
Ransom H. Gillet	Jacksonian	14th	March 4, 1833 – March 3, 1837	Odgensburg	?
Kirsten Gillibrand	Democratic	20th	January 3, 2007 – January 26, 2009	Greenport	Resigned after being appointed to the U.S. Senate.
Benjamin Gilman	Republican	26th	January 3, 1973 – January 3, 1983	Middletown	?
Benjamin Gilman	Republican	22nd	January 3, 1983 – January 3, 1993	Middletown	?
Benjamin Gilman	Republican	20th	January 3, 1993 – January 3, 2003	Middletown	?
Robert H. Gittins	Democratic	40th	March 4, 1913 – March 3, 1915	Niagara Falls	?
Henry Glen	Pro-Administration	8th	March 4, 1793 – March 3, 1795	?	?
Henry Glen	Federalist	8th	March 4, 1795 – March 3, 1801	?	?
Martin H. Glynn	Democratic	20th	March 4, 1899 – March 3, 1901	Albany	?
Thomas R. Gold	Federalist	11th	March 4, 1809 – March 3, 1813	Whitestown	?
Thomas R. Gold	Federalist	16th	March 4, 1815 – March 3, 1817	Whitestown	?
Henry M. Goldfogle	Democratic	9th	March 4, 1901 – March 3, 1913	Manhattan	?
Henry M. Goldfogle	Democratic	12th	March 4, 1913 – March 3, 1915	Manhattan	?
Henry M. Goldfogle	Democratic	12th	March 4, 1919 – March 3, 1921	Manhattan	?
Dan Goldman	Democratic	10th	January 3, 2023 – present	Manhattan	Incumbent
Charles Goodell	Republican	43rd	May 26, 1959 – January 3, 1963	Jamestown	Resigned after being appointed to the U.S. Senate.
Charles Goodell	Republican	38th	January 3, 1963 – September 9, 1968	Jamestown	Resigned after being appointed to the U.S. Senate.
Milo Goodrich	Republican	26th	March 4, 1871 – March 3, 1873	Dryden	?
Henry C. Goodwin	Whig	22nd	November 7, 1854 – March 3, 1855	Hamilton	?
Henry C. Goodwin	Republican	22nd	March 4, 1857 – March 3, 1859	Hamilton	?
Philip A. Goodwin	Republican	27th	March 4, 1933 – June 6, 1937	Coxsackie	Died.
Charles Goodyear	Democratic	21st	March 4, 1845 – March 3, 1847	Schoharie	?
Charles Goodyear	Democratic	14th	March 4, 1865 – March 3, 1867	Schoharie	?
James Gordon	Pro-Administration	6th	March 4, 1791 – March 3, 1793	?	?
James Gordon	Pro-Administration	9th	March 4, 1793 – March 3, 1795	?	?
Samuel Gordon	Democratic	20th	March 4, 1841 – March 3, 1843	Delhi	?
Samuel Gordon	Democratic	10th	March 4, 1845 – March 3, 1847	Delhi	?
Chester C. Gorski	Democratic	44th	January 3, 1949 – January 3, 1951	Buffalo	?
Daniel Gott	Whig	24th	March 4, 1847 – March 3, 1851	Pompey	?
Herman D. Gould	Whig	10th	March 4, 1849 – March 3, 1851	Delhi	?
Norman J. Gould	Republican	36th	November 2, 1915 – March 3, 1923	Seneca Falls	?
Joseph A. Goulden	Democratic	18th	March 4, 1903 – March 3, 1911	Fordham	?
Joseph A. Goulden	Democratic	23rd	March 4, 1913 – May 3, 1915	Fordham	Died.
James H. Graham	Republican	19th	March 4, 1859 – March 3, 1861	Delhi	?
John H. Graham	Democratic	5th	March 4, 1893 – March 3, 1895	Brooklyn	?
Amos P. Granger	Opposition	24th	March 4, 1855 – March 3, 1857	Syracuse	?
Amos P. Granger	Republican	24th	March 4, 1857 – March 3, 1859	Syracuse	?
Francis Granger	Anti-Jacksonian	26th	March 4, 1835 – March 3, 1837	Canandaigua	?
Francis Granger	Whig	26th	March 4, 1839 – March 5, 1841	Canandaigua	Resigned after being appointed U.S. Postmaster General.
Francis Granger	Whig	26th	November 27, 1841 – March 3, 1843	Canandaigua	?
Abraham P. Grant	Democratic	17th	March 4, 1837 – March 3, 1839	Oswego	?
Hiram Gray	Democratic	22nd	March 4, 1837 – March 3, 1839	Elmira	?
Horace Greeley	Whig	6th	December 4, 1848 – March 3, 1849	Manhattan	?
Byram Green	Democratic	27th	March 4, 1843 – March 3, 1845	Sodus	?
Bill Green	Republican	18th	February 14, 1978 – January 3, 1983	Manhattan	?
Bill Green	Republican	15th	January 3, 1983 – January 3, 1993	Manhattan	?
George Woodward Greene	Democratic	11th	March 4, 1869 – February 17, 1870	Goshen	Charles Van Wyck contested election.
Halbert S. Greenleaf	Democratic	30th	March 4, 1883 – March 3, 1885	Rochester	?
Halbert S. Greenleaf	Democratic	30th	March 4, 1891 – March 3, 1893	Rochester	?
Edward W. Greenman	Democratic	18th	March 4, 1887 – March 3, 1889	Troy	?
Ernest Greenwood	Democratic	1st	January 3, 1951 – January 3, 1953	Bay Shore	?
John Greig	Whig	26th	May 21, 1841 – September 25, 1841	Canandaigua	Resigned.
Anthony J. Griffin	Democratic	22nd	March 5, 1918 – January 13, 1935	Brooklyn	Died.
Daniel J. Griffin	Democratic	8th	March 4, 1913 – December 31, 1917	Brooklyn	Resigned when elected sheriff of Kings County.
Michael Grimm	Republican	13th	January 3, 2011 – January 3, 2013	Staten Island	Resigned.
Michael Grimm	Republican	11th	January 3, 2013 – January 5, 2015	Staten Island	Resigned.
Moses H. Grinnell	Whig	3rd	March 4, 1839 – March 3, 1841	Manhattan	?
Gaylord Griswold	Federalist	15th	March 4, 1803 – March 3, 1805	?	?
John Ashley Griswold	Democratic	13th	March 4, 1869 – March 3, 1871	Catskill	?
John Augustus Griswold	Democratic	15th	March 4, 1863 – March 3, 1865	Troy	?
John Augustus Griswold	Republican	15th	March 4, 1865 – March 3, 1869	Troy	?
Ezra C. Gross	Democratic-Republican	12th	March 4, 1819 – March 3, 1821	Elizabeth	?
Thomas P. Grosvenor	Federalist	6th	January 29, 1813 – March 3, 1813	Hudson	?
Thomas P. Grosvenor	Federalist	5th	March 4, 1813 – March 3, 1817	Hudson	?
James R. Grover Jr.	Republican	2nd	January 3, 1963 – January 3, 1975	Babylon	?
Martin Grover	Democratic	30th	March 4, 1845 – March 3, 1847	Angelica	?
Felix Grucci	Republican	1st	January 3, 2001 – January 3, 2003	Brookhaven	?
James Guyon Jr.	Democratic-Republican	1st	January 14, 1820 – March 3, 1821	Richmond	successfully challenged the election of Ebenezer Sage to the 16th Congress
Ralph W. Gwinn	Republican	27th	January 3, 1945 – January 3, 1959	Bronxville	?
Aaron Hackley Jr.	Democratic-Republican	17th	March 4, 1819 – March 3, 1821	Herkimer	?
Edward Haight	Democratic	9th	March 4, 1861 – March 3, 1863	Westchester	?
Charles Delemere Haines	Democratic	19th	November 8, 1893 – March 3, 1895	Kinderhook	?
Robert S. Hale	Republican	16th	December 3, 1866 – March 3, 1867	Elizabethtown	?
Robert S. Hale	Republican	17th	March 4, 1873 – March 3, 1875	Elizabethtown	?
Edwin Arthur Hall	Republican	34th	November 7, 1939 – January 3, 1945	Binghamton	Lost re-election.
Edwin Arthur Hall	Republican	37th	January 3, 1945 – January 3, 1953	Binghamton	Lost re-election.
George Hall	Democratic-Republican	19th	March 4, 1819 – March 3, 1821	Onondaga	?
John Hall	Democratic	19th	January 3, 2007 – January 3, 2011	Dover Plains	?
Leonard W. Hall	Republican	1st	January 3, 1939 – January 3, 1945	Oyster Bay	Resigned to become Chairman of the Republican National Committee.
Leonard W. Hall	Republican	2nd	January 3, 1945 – December 31, 1952	Oyster Bay	Resigned to become Chairman of the Republican National Committee.
Nathan K. Hall	Whig	32nd	March 4, 1847 – March 21, 1849	Buffalo	?
John Hallock Jr.	Jacksonian	6th	March 4, 1825 – March 3, 1829	Ridgebury	?
Ransom Halloway	Whig	8th	March 4, 1849 – March 3, 1851	Beekman	?
Seymour Halpern	Republican	4th	January 3, 1959 – January 3, 1963	Forest Hills	?
Seymour Halpern	Republican	6th	January 3, 1963 – January 3, 1973	Forest Hills	?
Jehiel H. Halsey	Jacksonian	26th	March 4, 1829 – March 3, 1831	Lodi	?
Nicoll Halsey	Jacksonian	22nd	March 4, 1833 – March 3, 1835	Trumansburg	?
Silas Halsey	Democratic-Republican	17th	March 4, 1805 – March 3, 1807	?	?
Charles Mann Hamilton	Republican	43rd	March 4, 1913 – March 3, 1919	Ripley	?
Jabez Delano Hammond	Democratic-Republican	15th	March 4, 1815 – March 3, 1817	Cherry Valley	?
John Hammond	Republican	18th	March 4, 1879 – March 3, 1883	Crown Point	?
Harry A. Hanbury	Republican	4th	March 4, 1901 – March 3, 1903	Brooklyn	?
Clarence E. Hancock	Republican	35th	November 8, 1927 – January 3, 1945	Syracuse	?
Clarence E. Hancock	Republican	36th	January 3, 1945 – January 3, 1947	Syracuse	?
Augustus C. Hand	Democratic	13th	March 4, 1839 – March 3, 1841	Elizabethtown	?
James M. Hanley	Democratic	34th	January 3, 1965 – January 3, 1971	Syracuse	?
James M. Hanley	Democratic	35th	January 3, 1971 – January 3, 1973	Syracuse	?
James M. Hanley	Democratic	32nd	January 3, 1973 – January 3, 1981	Syracuse	?
Richard L. Hanna	Republican	24th	January 3, 2011 – January 3, 2013	Barneveld	?
Richard L. Hanna	Republican	22nd	January 3, 2013 – January 3, 2017	Barneveld	?
Gideon Hard	Anti-Masonic	33rd	March 4, 1833 – March 3, 1835	Albion	?
Gideon Hard	Anti-Jacksonian	33rd	March 4, 1835 – March 3, 1837	Albion	?
John Hardy	Democratic	9th	December 5, 1881 – March 3, 1885	Manhattan	Lost re-election.
John Harris	Democratic-Republican	17th	March 4, 1807 – March 3, 1809	Aurelias	?
Francis Burton Harrison	Democratic	13th	March 4, 1903 – March 3, 1905	Manhattan	?
Francis Burton Harrison	Democratic	16th	March 4, 1907 – March 3, 1913	Manhattan	Resigned after being appointed Governor-General of the Philippines.
Francis Burton Harrison	Democratic	20th	March 4, 1913 – September 3, 1913	Manhattan	Resigned after being appointed Governor-General of the Philippines.
Elizur K. Hart	Democratic	30th	March 4, 1877 – March 3, 1879	Albion	?
Emanuel B. Hart	Democratic	3rd	March 4, 1851 – March 3, 1853	Manhattan	?
Roswell Hart	Republican	28th	March 4, 1865 – March 3, 1867	Rochester	?
J. Francis Harter	Republican	41st	January 3, 1939 – January 3, 1941	Eggertsville	?
Abraham Bruyn Hasbrouck	Anti-Jacksonian	7th	March 4, 1825 – March 3, 1827	Kingston	?
Abraham J. Hasbrouck	Democratic-Republican	7th	March 4, 1813 – March 3, 1815	Kingstown	?
Josiah Hasbrouck	Democratic-Republican	7th	October 17, 1803 – March 3, 1805	New Paltz	?
Josiah Hasbrouck	Democratic-Republican	7th	March 4, 1817 – March 3, 1819	New Paltz	?
Augustus P. Hascall	Whig	33rd	March 4, 1851 – March 3, 1853	Le Roy	?
Reuben L. Haskell	Republican	10th	March 4, 1915 – December 31, 1919	Brooklyn	Resigned.
John B. Haskin	Democratic	9th	March 4, 1857 – March 3, 1859	Fordham	?
John B. Haskin	Anti-Lecompton Democratic	9th	March 4, 1857 – March 3, 1859	Fordham	?
George Hastings	Democratic	28th	March 4, 1853 – March 3, 1855	Mount Morris	?
James F. Hastings	Republican	38th	January 3, 1969 – January 3, 1973	Allegany	Resigned.
James F. Hastings	Republican	39th	January 3, 1973 – January 20, 1976	Allegany	Resigned.
Israel T. Hatch	Democratic	32nd	March 4, 1857 – March 3, 1859	Buffalo	?
Samuel G. Hathaway	Jacksonian	22nd	March 4, 1833 – March 3, 1835	Solon	?
Henry H. Hathorn	Republican	19th	March 4, 1873 – March 3, 1875	Saratoga Springs	?
Henry H. Hathorn	Republican	20th	March 4, 1875 – March 3, 1877	Saratoga Springs	?
John Hathorn	Anti-Administration	4th	March 4, 1789 – March 3, 1791	Warwick	?
John Hathorn	Democratic-Republican	4th	March 4, 1795 – March 3, 1797	Warwick	?
Solomon G. Haven	Whig	32nd	March 4, 1851 – March 3, 1855	Buffalo	?
Solomon G. Haven	Opposition	32nd	March 4, 1855 – March 3, 1857	Buffalo	?
James S. Havens	Democratic	32nd	April 19, 1910 – March 3, 1911	Rochester	?
Jonathan Nicoll Havens	Democratic-Republican	1st	March 4, 1795 – October 25, 1799	?	Died.
James Hawkes	Democratic-Republican	15th	March 4, 1819 – March 3, 1821	Richfield	?
Joseph Hawkins	Anti-Jacksonian	20th	March 4, 1829 – March 3, 1831	Henderson	?
John Henry Hobart Haws	Whig	4th	March 4, 1851 – March 3, 1853	Manhattan	?
Moses Hayden	Democratic-Republican	27th	March 4, 1823 – March 3, 1825	York	?
Moses Hayden	Anti-Jacksonian	27th	March 4, 1825 – March 3, 1827	York	?
Nan Hayworth	Republican	19th	January 3, 2011 – January 3, 2013	Mount Kisco	?
Abner Hazeltine	Anti-Masonic	31st	March 4, 1833 – March 3, 1835	Jamestown	?
Abner Hazeltine	Anti-Jacksonian	31st	March 4, 1835 – March 3, 1837	Jamestown	?
James C. Healey	Democratic	22nd	February 7, 1956 – January 3, 1963	Manhattan	?
James C. Healey	Democratic	21st	January 3, 1963 – January 3, 1965	Manhattan	?
William Randolph Hearst	Democratic	11th	March 4, 1903 – March 3, 1907	Manhattan	?
James J. Heffernan	Democratic	5th	January 3, 1941 – January 3, 1945	Brooklyn	?
James J. Heffernan	Democratic	11th	January 3, 1945 – January 3, 1953	Brooklyn	?
Louis B. Heller	Democratic	7th	February 15, 1949 – January 3, 1953	Brooklyn	Resigned.
Louis B. Heller	Democratic	8th	January 3, 1953 – July 21, 1954	Brooklyn	Resigned.
Joseph C. Hendrix	Democratic	3rd	March 4, 1893 – March 3, 1895	Brooklyn	?
Lewis Henry	Republican	37th	April 11, 1922 – March 3, 1923	Elmira	?
John Herkimer	Democratic-Republican	14th	March 4, 1817 – March 3, 1819	Danube	?
John Herkimer	Democratic-Republican	15th	March 4, 1823 – March 3, 1825	Danube	?
Anson Herrick	Democratic	9th	March 4, 1863 – March 3, 1865	Manhattan	?
Richard P. Herrick	Whig	12th	March 4, 1845 – June 20, 1846	Greenbush	Died.
Abram Hewitt	Democratic	10th	March 4, 1875 – March 3, 1879	Manhattan	?
Frederick C. Hicks	Republican	1st	March 4, 1915 – March 3, 1923	Port Washington	?
Brian Higgins	Democratic	27th	January 3, 2005 – January 3, 2013	Buffalo	Resigned to become the president and CEO of Shea's Performing Arts Center.
Brian Higgins	Democratic	26th	January 3, 2013 – February 2, 2024	Buffalo	Resigned to become the president and CEO of Shea's Performing Arts Center.
William Henry Hill	Republican	34th	March 4, 1919 – March 3, 1921	Johnson City	?
Maurice Hinchey	Democratic	26th	January 3, 1993 – January 3, 2003	Saugerties	?
Maurice Hinchey	Democratic	22nd	January 3, 2003 – January 3, 2013	Saugerties	?
Frank Hiscock	Republican	25th	March 4, 1877 – March 3, 1887	Syracuse	Resigned when elected to the U.S. Senate.
Charles B. Hoard	Republican	23rd	March 4, 1857 – March 3, 1861	Watertown	?
Selah R. Hobbie	Jacksonian	11th	March 4, 1827 – March 3, 1829	Delhi	?
George J. Hochbrueckner	Democratic	1st	January 3, 1987 – January 3, 1995	Coram	?
Kathy Hochul	Democratic	26th	June 1, 2011 – January 3, 2013	Hamburg	?
Michael Hoffman	Jacksonian	15th	March 4, 1825 – March 3, 1833	Herkimer	?
Ogden Hoffman	Whig	3rd	March 4, 1837 – March 3, 1841	Manhattan	?
Michael J. Hogan	Republican	7th	March 4, 1921 – March 3, 1923	Brooklyn	?
William Hogan	Jacksonian	19th	March 4, 1831 – March 3, 1833	Hogansburg	?
James L. Hogeboom	Democratic-Republican	9th	March 4, 1823 – March 3, 1825	Castleton-on-Hudson	?
John M. Holley	Whig	27th	March 4, 1847 – March 8, 1848	Lyons	Died.
Charles H. Holmes	Republican	28th	December 6, 1870 – March 3, 1871	Albion	?
Elias B. Holmes	Whig	28th	March 4, 1845 – March 3, 1849	Brockport	?
Sidney T. Holmes	Republican	22nd	March 4, 1865 – March 3, 1867	Morrisville	?
Elizabeth Holtzman	Democratic	16th	January 3, 1973 – January 3, 1981	Brooklyn	?
Lester Holtzman	Democratic	6th	January 3, 1953 – December 31, 1961	Rego Park	Resigned.
Warren B. Hooker	Republican	34th	March 4, 1891 – November 10, 1898	Fredonia	Resigned after being appointed justice of New York Supreme Court.
Samuel M. Hopkins	Federalist	21st	March 4, 1813 – March 3, 1815	Manhattan	?
Stephen T. Hopkins	Republican	17th	March 4, 1887 – March 3, 1889	Catskill	?
Jerediah Horsford	Whig	29th	March 4, 1851 – March 3, 1853	Moscow	?
Frank Horton	Republican	36th	January 3, 1963 – January 3, 1973	Rochester	?
Frank Horton	Republican	34th	January 3, 1973 – January 3, 1983	Rochester	?
Frank Horton	Republican	29th	January 3, 1983 – January 3, 1993	Rochester	?
Thomas R. Horton	Opposition	18th	March 4, 1855 – March 3, 1857	Fultonville	?
George Gilbert Hoskins	Republican	30th	March 4, 1873 – March 3, 1875	Attica	?
George Gilbert Hoskins	Republican	31st	March 4, 1875 – March 3, 1877	Attica	?
Hezekiah L. Hosmer	Federalist	6th	March 4, 1797 – March 3, 1799	?	?
Giles W. Hotchkiss	Republican	26th	March 4, 1863 – March 3, 1867	Binghamton	?
Giles W. Hotchkiss	Republican	26th	March 4, 1869 – March 3, 1871	Binghamton	?
Jacob Houck Jr.	Democratic	8th	March 4, 1841 – March 3, 1843	Schoharie	?
William J. Hough	Democratic	23rd	March 4, 1845 – March 3, 1847	Cazenovia	?
Alanson B. Houghton	Republican	37th	March 4, 1919 – February 28, 1922	Corning	Resigned to become United States Ambassador to Germany.
Amo Houghton	Republican	34th	January 3, 1987 – January 3, 1993	Corning	?
Amo Houghton	Republican	31st	January 3, 1993 – January 3, 2003	Corning	?
Amo Houghton	Republican	29th	January 3, 2003 – January 3, 2005	Corning	?
James R. Howe	Republican	6th	March 4, 1895 – March 3, 1899	Brooklyn	?
Thomas Y. Howe Jr.	Democratic	25th	March 4, 1851 – March 3, 1853	Auburn	?
Edward Howell	Jacksonian	27th	March 4, 1833 – March 3, 1835	Bath	?
Nathaniel W. Howell	Federalist	21st	March 4, 1813 – March 3, 1815	Canandaigua	?
Demas Hubbard Jr.	Republican	19th	March 4, 1865 – March 3, 1867	Smyrna	?
Thomas H. Hubbard	Democratic-Republican	17th	March 4, 1817 – March 3, 1819	Hamilton	?
Thomas H. Hubbard	Democratic-Republican	17th	March 4, 1821 – March 3, 1823	Hamilton	?
Edwin N. Hubbell	Democratic	13th	March 4, 1865 – March 3, 1867	Coxsackie	?
William Spring Hubbell	Democratic	30th	March 4, 1843 – March 3, 1845	Bath	?
Charles Hughes	Democratic	15th	March 4, 1853 – March 3, 1855	Sandy Hill	?
Jonas A. Hughston	Opposition	19th	March 4, 1855 – March 3, 1857	Delhi	?
Daniel Hugunin Jr.	Anti-Jacksonian	20th	December 15, 1825 – March 3, 1827	Oswego	?
George Murray Hulbert	Democratic	21st	March 4, 1915 – January 1, 1918	Manhattan	Resigned to become Commissioner of Docks and Director of the Port of New York City.
Calvin T. Hulburd	Republican	17th	March 4, 1863 – March 3, 1869	Brasher Falls	?
Charles Humphrey	Anti-Jacksonian	25th	March 4, 1825 – March 3, 1827	Ithaca	?
James Humphrey	Republican	2nd	March 4, 1859 – March 3, 1861	Brooklyn	?
James Humphrey	Republican	3rd	March 4, 1865 – June 16, 1866	Brooklyn	Died.
James M. Humphrey	Democratic	30th	March 4, 1865 – March 3, 1869	Buffalo	?
Reuben Humphrey	Democratic-Republican	16th	March 4, 1807 – March 3, 1809	Marcellus	?
John N. Hungerford	Republican	29th	March 4, 1877 – March 3, 1879	Corning	?
Orville Hungerford	Democratic	19th	March 4, 1843 – March 3, 1847	Watertown	?
Hiram P. Hunt	Anti-Jacksonian	9th	March 4, 1835 – March 3, 1837	Troy	?
Hiram P. Hunt	Whig	9th	March 4, 1839 – March 3, 1843	Troy	?
Washington Hunt	Whig	34th	March 4, 1843 – March 3, 1849	Lockport	?
John W. Hunter	Democratic	3rd	December 4, 1866 – March 3, 1867	Brooklyn	?
Abel Huntington	Jacksonian	1st	March 4, 1833 – March 3, 1837	East Hampton	?
Denis M. Hurley	Republican	2nd	March 4, 1895 – February 26, 1899	Brooklyn	Died.
James W. Husted	Republican	25th	March 4, 1915 – March 3, 1923	Peekskill	?
Waldo Hutchins	Democratic	12th	November 4, 1879 – March 3, 1885	Kingsbridge	?
William Irvine	Republican	28th	March 4, 1859 – March 3, 1861	Corning	?
William Irving	Democratic-Republican	2nd	January 22, 1814 – March 3, 1819	Manhattan	?
Leo Isacson	American Labor	24th	February 17, 1948 – January 3, 1949	Manhattan	?
Steve Israel	Democratic	2nd	January 3, 2001 – January 3, 2013	Burlington	?
Steve Israel	Democratic	3rd	January 3, 2013 – January 3, 2017	Burlington	?
Willard Ives	Democratic	19th	March 4, 1851 – March 3, 1853	Watertown	?
David S. Jackson	Democratic	6th	March 4, 1847 – April 19, 1848	Manhattan	House declared seat vacant after contested election.
Thomas B. Jackson	Democratic	1st	March 4, 1837 – March 3, 1841	Elmhurst	?
William Terry Jackson	Whig	26th	March 4, 1849 – March 3, 1851	Montour Falls	?
Chris Jacobs	Republican	27th	June 23, 2020 – January 3, 2023	Buffalo	Retired.
Ferris Jacobs Jr.	Republican	21st	March 4, 1881 – March 3, 1883	Delhi	?
Meyer Jacobstein	Democratic	38th	March 4, 1923 – March 3, 1929	Rochester	?
Amaziah B. James	Republican	19th	March 4, 1877 – March 3, 1881	Ogdensburg	?
Darwin R. James	Republican	3rd	March 4, 1883 – March 3, 1887	Brooklyn	?
Jacob Javits	Republican	21st	January 3, 1947 – December 31, 1954	Manhattan	Resigned when elected as New York State Attorney General.
Hakeem Jeffries	Democratic	8th	January 3, 2013 – present	Brooklyn	Incumbent
Lemuel Jenkins	Democratic-Republican	7th	March 4, 1823 – March 3, 1825	Bloomingburg	?
Timothy Jenkins	Democratic	20th	March 4, 1845 – March 3, 1849	Oneida Castle	?
Timothy Jenkins	Democratic	20th	March 4, 1851 – March 3, 1853	Oneida Castle	?
Freeborn G. Jewett	Jacksonian	23rd	March 4, 1831 – March 3, 1833	Skaneateles	?
Frederick A. Johnson	Republican	18th	March 4, 1883 – March 3, 1885	Glens Falls	?
Frederick A. Johnson	Republican	21st	March 4, 1885 – March 3, 1887	Glens Falls	?
Jeromus Johnson	Jacksonian	3rd	March 4, 1825 – March 3, 1829	Manhattan	?
Noadiah Johnson	Jacksonian	20th	March 4, 1833 – March 3, 1835	Delhi	?
Charles Johnston	Whig	5th	March 4, 1839 – March 3, 1841	Poughkeepsie	?
John B. Johnston	Democratic	5th	March 4, 1919 – March 3, 1921	Brooklyn	?
Daniel T. Jones	Democratic	24th	March 4, 1851 – March 3, 1855	Baldwinsville	?
Mondaire Jones	Democratic	17th	January 3, 2021 – January 3, 2023	Spring Valley	Lost renomination to Goldman
Morgan Jones	Democratic	4th	March 4, 1865 – March 3, 1867	Manhattan	?
Nathaniel Jones	Democratic	6th	March 4, 1837 – March 3, 1841	Warwick	?
Martin Kalbfleisch	Democratic	2nd	March 4, 1863 – March 3, 1865	Brooklyn	?
Nicholas T. Kane	Democratic	19th	March 4, 1887 – September 14, 1887	Albany	Died.
John Katko	Republican	24th	January 3, 2015 – January 3, 2023	Syracuse	Retired.
Bernard W. Kearney	Republican	30th	January 3, 1943 – January 3, 1945	Gloversville	?
Bernard W. Kearney	Republican	31st	January 3, 1945 – January 3, 1953	Gloversville	?
Bernard W. Kearney	Republican	32nd	January 3, 1953 – January 3, 1959	Gloversville	?
Kenneth Keating	Republican	40th	January 3, 1947 – January 3, 1953	Rochester	?
Kenneth Keating	Republican	38th	January 3, 1953 – January 3, 1959	Rochester	?
Richard Keese	Democratic	19th	March 4, 1827 – March 3, 1829	Keeseville	?
Charles Kellogg	Jacksonian	24th	March 4, 1825 – March 3, 1827	Kelloggsville	?
Orlando Kellogg	Whig	14th	March 4, 1847 – March 3, 1849	Elizabethtown	?
Orlando Kellogg	Republican	16th	March 4, 1863 – August 24, 1865	Elizabethtown	Died.
Edna F. Kelly	Democratic	10th	November 8, 1949 – January 3, 1963	Brooklyn	?
Edna F. Kelly	Democratic	12th	January 3, 1963 – January 3, 1969	Brooklyn	?
George Bradshaw Kelly	Democratic	38th	January 3, 1937 – January 3, 1939	Rochester	?
John Kelly	Democratic	4th	March 4, 1855 – December 25, 1858	Manhattan	Resigned.
Sue W. Kelly	Republican	19th	January 3, 1995 – January 3, 2007	Katonah	?
William H. Kelsey	Opposition	28th	March 4, 1855 – March 3, 1857	Geneseo	?
William H. Kelsey	Republican	28th	March 4, 1857 – March 3, 1859	Geneseo	?
William H. Kelsey	Republican	25th	March 4, 1867 – March 3, 1871	Geneseo	?
Gouverneur Kemble	Democratic	4th	March 4, 1837 – March 3, 1841	Cold Spring	?
Jack Kemp	Republican	39th	January 3, 1971 – January 3, 1973	Hamburg	?
Jack Kemp	Republican	38th	January 3, 1973 – January 3, 1983	Hamburg	?
Jack Kemp	Republican	31st	January 3, 1983 – January 3, 1989	Hamburg	?
Thomas Kempshall	Whig	28th	March 4, 1839 – March 3, 1841	Rochester	?
Martin J. Kennedy	Democratic	18th	April 11, 1930 – January 3, 1945	Manhattan	?
Michael J. Kennedy	Democratic	15th	January 3, 1939 – January 3, 1943	Manhattan	?
Tim Kennedy	Democratic	26th	April 30, 2024 – present	Buffalo	Incumbent; Elected to finish the term of Brian Higgins.
Moss Kent	Federalist	18th	March 4, 1813 – March 3, 1817	Leraysville	?
William S. Kenyon	Republican	11th	March 4, 1859 – March 3, 1861	Kingston	?
Eugene James Keogh	Democratic	9th	January 3, 1937 – January 3, 1963	Brooklyn	?
Eugene James Keogh	Democratic	11th	January 3, 1963 – January 3, 1967	Brooklyn	?
Francis Kernan	Democratic	21st	March 4, 1863 – March 3, 1865	Utica	?
James Kerrigan	Democratic	4th	March 4, 1861 – March 3, 1863	Manhattan	?
John H. Ketcham	Republican	12th	March 4, 1865 – March 3, 1873	Dover	?
John H. Ketcham	Republican	13th	March 4, 1877 – March 3, 1885	Dover	?
John H. Ketcham	Republican	16th	March 4, 1885 – March 3, 1893	Dover	?
John H. Ketcham	Republican	18th	March 4, 1897 – March 3, 1903	Dover	Died.
John H. Ketcham	Republican	21st	March 4, 1903 – November 4, 1906	Dover	Died.
Clarence E. Kilburn	Republican	31st	February 13, 1940 – January 3, 1945	Malone	?
Clarence E. Kilburn	Republican	34th	January 3, 1945 – January 3, 1953	Malone	?
Clarence E. Kilburn	Republican	33rd	January 3, 1953 – January 3, 1963	Malone	?
Clarence E. Kilburn	Republican	31st	January 3, 1963 – January 3, 1965	Malone	?
John J. Kindred	Democratic	14th	March 4, 1911 – March 3, 1913	Long Island City	?
John J. Kindred	Democratic	2nd	March 4, 1921 – March 3, 1929	Long Island City	?
Carleton J. King	Republican	31st	January 3, 1961 – January 3, 1963	Saratoga Springs	Resigned.
Carleton J. King	Republican	30th	January 3, 1963 – January 3, 1973	Saratoga Springs	Resigned.
Carleton J. King	Republican	29th	January 3, 1973 – December 31, 1974	Saratoga Springs	Resigned.
John King	Jacksonian	8th	March 4, 1831 – March 3, 1833	New Lebanon	?
John A. King	Whig	1st	March 4, 1849 – March 3, 1851	Jamaica	?
Perkins King	Jacksonian	11th	March 4, 1829 – March 3, 1831	Freehold	?
Peter T. King	Republican	3rd	January 3, 1993 – January 3, 2013	Seaford	?
Peter T. King	Republican	2nd	January 3, 2013 – January 3, 2021	Seaford	Retired.
Preston King	Democratic	18th	March 4, 1843 – March 3, 1847	Ogdensburg	?
Preston King	Free Soil	18th	March 4, 1849 – March 3, 1853	Ogdensburg	?
Rufus H. King	Opposition	11th	March 4, 1855 – March 3, 1857	Catskill	?
Thomas Kinsella	Democratic	2nd	March 4, 1871 – March 3, 1873	Brooklyn	?
Joseph Kirkland	Federalist	16th	March 4, 1821 – March 3, 1823	Utica	?
William Kirkpatrick	Democratic-Republican	15th	March 4, 1807 – March 3, 1809	Salina	?
Dorrance Kirtland	Democratic-Republican	8th	March 4, 1817 – March 3, 1819	Coxsackie	?
John Kissel	Republican	3rd	March 4, 1921 – March 3, 1923	Brooklyn	?
Arthur George Klein	Democratic	14th	July 29, 1941 – January 3, 1945	Manhattan	?
Arthur George Klein	Democratic	19th	February 19, 1946 – December 31, 1956	Manhattan	Resigned to become justice on New York Supreme Court.
Ardolph L. Kline	Republican	5th	March 4, 1921 – March 3, 1923	Brooklyn	?
Charles Knapp	Republican	19th	March 4, 1869 – March 3, 1871	Deposit	?
Charles J. Knapp	Republican	17th	March 4, 1889 – March 3, 1891	Deposit	?
Charles L. Knapp	Republican	24th	November 5, 1901 – March 3, 1903	Lowville	?
Charles L. Knapp	Republican	28th	March 4, 1903 – March 3, 1911	Lowville	?
Herman Knickerbocker	Federalist	6th	March 4, 1809 – March 3, 1811	Schaghticoke	?
Ed Koch	Democratic	17th	January 3, 1969 – January 3, 1973	Manhattan	Resigned when elected Mayor of New York City.
Ed Koch	Democratic	18th	January 3, 1973 – December 31, 1977	Manhattan	Resigned when elected Mayor of New York City.
Randy Kuhl	Republican	29th	January 3, 2005 – January 3, 2009	Hammondsport	?
Theodore R. Kupferman	Republican	17th	February 8, 1966 – January 3, 1969	Manhattan	?
John J. LaFalce	Democratic	36th	January 3, 1975 – January 3, 1983	Tonawanda	?
John J. LaFalce	Democratic	32nd	January 3, 1983 – January 3, 1993	Tonawanda	?
John J. LaFalce	Democratic	29th	January 3, 1993 – January 3, 2003	Tonawanda	?
Addison H. Laflin	Republican	20th	March 4, 1865 – March 3, 1871	Herkimer	?
Fiorello La Guardia	Republican	14th	March 4, 1917 – December 31, 1919	Manhattan	Resigned.
Fiorello La Guardia	Republican	20th	March 4, 1923 – March 3, 1925	Manhattan	?
Fiorello La Guardia	Socialist	20th	March 4, 1925 – March 3, 1927	Manhattan	?
Fiorello La Guardia	Republican	20th	March 4, 1927 – March 3, 1933	Manhattan	?
William G. Laidlaw	Republican	34th	March 4, 1887 – March 3, 1891	Ellicottville	?
Nick LaLota	Republican	1st	January 3, 2023 – present	Amityville	Incumbent
William H. Lamport	Republican	25th	March 4, 1871 – March 3, 1873	Canandaigua	?
William H. Lamport	Republican	26th	March 4, 1873 – March 3, 1875	Canandaigua	?
Nick Langworthy	Republican	23rd	January 3, 2023 – present	Amherst	Incumbent
Frederick Lansing	Republican	22nd	March 4, 1889 – March 3, 1891	Watertown	?
Gerrit Y. Lansing	Jacksonian	10th	March 4, 1831 – March 3, 1837	Albany	?
William E. Lansing	Republican	22nd	March 4, 1871 – March 3, 1873	Albany	?
William E. Lansing	Republican	23rd	March 4, 1873 – March 3, 1875	Albany	?
James J. Lanzetta	Democratic	20th	March 4, 1933 – January 3, 1935	Manhattan	?
James J. Lanzetta	Democratic	20th	January 3, 1937 – January 3, 1939	Manhattan	?
Elbridge G. Lapham	Republican	27th	March 4, 1875 – July 29, 1881	Canandaigua	Resigned when elected to the U.S. Senate.
Henry J. Latham	Republican	3rd	January 3, 1945 – January 3, 1953	Queens Village	Resigned.
Henry J. Latham	Republican	4th	January 3, 1953 – December 31, 1958	Queens Village	Resigned.
George Latimer	Democratic	16th	January 3, 2025 – present	Rye	Incumbent
John Laurance	Pro-Administration	2nd	March 4, 1789 – March 3, 1793	?	?
Charles B. Law	Republican	4th	March 4, 1905 – March 3, 1911	Brooklyn	?
Mike Lawler	Republican	17th	January 3, 2023 – present	Pearl River	Incumbent
Cornelius Lawrence	Jacksonian	3rd	March 4, 1833 – May 14, 1834	Manhattan	Resigned after becoming Mayor of New York.
John W. Lawrence	Democratic	1st	March 4, 1845 – March 3, 1847	Flushing	?
Samuel Lawrence	Democratic-Republican	25th	March 4, 1823 – March 3, 1825	Johnsons Settlement	?
Sidney Lawrence	Democratic	15th	March 4, 1847 – March 3, 1849	Moira	?
William T. Lawrence	Whig	26th	March 4, 1847 – March 3, 1849	Catuyaville	?
John D. Lawson	Republican	8th	March 4, 1873 – March 3, 1875	Manhattan	?
Thomas Lawyer	Democratic-Republican	13th	March 4, 1817 – March 3, 1819	Cobleskill	?
George W. Lay	Anti-Masonic	29th	March 4, 1833 – March 3, 1835	Batavia	?
George W. Lay	Anti-Jacksonian	29th	March 4, 1835 – March 3, 1837	Batavia	?
Rick Lazio	Republican	2nd	January 3, 1993 – January 3, 2001	Brightwaters	?
Elias W. Leavenworth	Republican	25th	March 4, 1875 – March 3, 1877	Syracuse	?
John LeBoutillier	Republican	6th	January 3, 1981 – January 3, 1983	Westbury	?
Chris Lee	Republican	26th	January 3, 2009 – February 9, 2011	Clarence	Resigned.
Gary A. Lee	Republican	33rd	January 3, 1979 – January 3, 1983	Dryden	?
Gideon Lee	Jacksonian	3rd	November 4, 1835 – March 3, 1837	Manhattan	?
Joshua Lee	Jacksonian	27th	March 4, 1835 – March 3, 1837	Penn Yan	?
M. Lindley Lee	Republican	22nd	March 4, 1859 – March 3, 1861	Fulton	?
Warren I. Lee	Republican	6th	March 4, 1921 – March 3, 1923	Brooklyn	?
Jacob LeFever	Republican	18th	March 4, 1893 – March 3, 1897	New Paltz	?
Frank J. LeFevre	Republican	24th	March 4, 1905 – March 3, 1907	New Paltz	?
Jay Le Fevre	Republican	27th	January 3, 1943 – January 3, 1945	New Paltz	?
Jay Le Fevre	Republican	30th	January 3, 1945 – January 3, 1951	New Paltz	?
John Lefferts	Democratic-Republican	1st	March 4, 1813 – March 3, 1815	Brooklyn	?
James Lent	Democratic	1st	March 4, 1829 – February 22, 1833	Newtown	Died.
Norman F. Lent	Republican	5th	January 3, 1971 – January 3, 1973	East Rockaway	?
Norman F. Lent	Republican	4th	January 3, 1973 – January 3, 1993	East Rockaway	?
Moses G. Leonard	Democratic	5th	March 4, 1843 – March 3, 1845	Manhattan	?
Stephen B. Leonard	Jacksonian	22nd	March 4, 1835 – March 3, 1837	Owego	?
Stephen B. Leonard	Democratic	22nd	March 4, 1839 – March 3, 1841	Owego	?
Montague Lessler	Republican	7th	January 7, 1902 – March 3, 1903	Manhattan	?
David A. Levy	Republican	4th	January 3, 1993 – January 3, 1995	Baldwin	?
Jefferson Monroe Levy	Democratic	13th	March 4, 1899 – March 3, 1901	Manhattan	?
Jefferson Monroe Levy	Democratic	13th	March 4, 1911 – March 3, 1913	Manhattan	?
Jefferson Monroe Levy	Democratic	14th	March 4, 1913 – March 3, 1915	Manhattan	?
Abner Lewis	Whig	31st	March 4, 1845 – March 3, 1847	Panama	?
William S. Lincoln	Republican	26th	March 4, 1867 – March 3, 1869	Owego	?
George H. Lindsay	Democratic	6th	March 4, 1901 – March 3, 1903	Brooklyn	?
George H. Lindsay	Democratic	2nd	March 4, 1903 – March 3, 1913	Brooklyn	?
George W. Lindsay	Democratic	3rd	March 4, 1923 – January 3, 1935	Brooklyn	?
John Lindsay	Republican	17th	January 3, 1959 – December 31, 1965	Manhattan	Resigned to become Mayor of New York City.
James Girard Lindsley	Republican	17th	March 4, 1885 – March 3, 1887	Rondout	?
Archibald L. Linn	Whig	11th	March 4, 1841 – March 3, 1843	Schenectady	?
Elisha Litchfield	Democratic-Republican	19th	March 4, 1821 – March 3, 1823	Delphi Falls	?
Elisha Litchfield	Democratic-Republican	23rd	March 4, 1823 – March 3, 1825	Delphi Falls	?
Lucius Littauer	Republican	22nd	March 4, 1897 – March 3, 1903	Gloversville	?
Lucius Littauer	Republican	25th	March 4, 1903 – March 3, 1907	Gloversville	?
Joseph J. Little	Democratic	12th	November 3, 1891 – March 3, 1893	Manhattan	?
DeWitt Clinton Littlejohn	Republican	22nd	March 4, 1863 – March 3, 1865	Oswego	?
Martin W. Littleton	Democratic	1st	March 4, 1911 – March 3, 1913	Port Washington	?
Edward Livingston	Democratic-Republican	2nd	March 4, 1795 – March 3, 1801	?	?
Henry W. Livingston	Federalist	8th	March 4, 1803 – March 3, 1807	?	?
Robert Le Roy Livingston	Federalist	6th	March 4, 1809 – May 6, 1812	Hudson	Resigned.
Daniel N. Lockwood	Democratic	32nd	March 4, 1877 – March 3, 1879	Buffalo	?
Daniel N. Lockwood	Democratic	32nd	March 4, 1891 – March 3, 1895	Buffalo	?
George W. Loft	Democratic	13th	November 4, 1913 – March 3, 1917	Manhattan	?
Meyer London	Socialist	12th	March 4, 1915 – March 3, 1919	Manhattan	?
Meyer London	Socialist	12th	March 4, 1921 – March 3, 1923	Manhattan	?
Arphaxed Loomis	Democratic	16th	March 4, 1837 – March 3, 1839	Little Falls	?
Bert Lord	Republican	34th	January 3, 1935 – May 24, 1939	Afton	Died.
Frederick William Lord	Democratic	1st	March 4, 1847 – March 3, 1849	Greenport	?
Scott Lord	Democratic	23rd	March 4, 1875 – March 3, 1877	Utica	?
William Lounsbery	Democratic	15th	March 4, 1879 – March 3, 1881	Kingston	?
Thomas C. Love	Anti-Jacksonian	32nd	March 4, 1835 – March 3, 1837	Buffalo	?
John Lovett	Federalist	9th	March 4, 1813 – March 3, 1817	Albany	?
Philip B. Low	Republican	15th	March 4, 1895 – March 3, 1899	Manhattan	?
Allard K. Lowenstein	Democratic	5th	January 3, 1969 – January 3, 1971	Long Beach	?
Nita Lowey	Democratic	20th	January 3, 1989 – January 3, 1993	White Plains	Retired.
Nita Lowey	Democratic	18th	January 3, 1993 – January 3, 2013	White Plains	Retired.
Nita Lowey	Democratic	17th	January 3, 2013 – January 3, 2021	White Plains	Retired.
Stan Lundine	Democratic	39th	March 2, 1976 – January 3, 1983	Jamestown	?
Stan Lundine	Democratic	34th	January 3, 1983 – January 3, 1987	Jamestown	?
George R. Lunn	Democratic	30th	March 4, 1917 – March 3, 1919	Schenectady	?
Joseph S. Lyman	Democratic-Republican	15th	March 4, 1819 – March 3, 1821	Cooperstown	?
Walter A. Lynch	Democratic	22nd	February 20, 1940 – January 3, 1945	Manhattan	?
Walter A. Lynch	Democratic	23rd	January 3, 1945 – January 3, 1951	Manhattan	?
Caleb Lyon	Independent	23rd	March 4, 1853 – March 3, 1855	Lyonsdale	?
John MacCrate	Republican	3rd	March 4, 1919 – December 30, 1920	Brooklyn	Resigned to become justice of New York Supreme Court.
Clinton D. MacDougall	Republican	25th	March 4, 1873 – March 3, 1875	Auburn	?
Clinton D. MacDougall	Republican	26th	March 4, 1875 – March 3, 1877	Auburn	?
Clarence MacGregor	Republican	41st	March 4, 1919 – December 31, 1928	Buffalo	Resigned when elected as justice on New York Supreme Court.
William B. Maclay	Democratic	4th	March 4, 1843 – March 3, 1849	Manhattan	?
William B. Maclay	Democratic	5th	March 4, 1857 – March 3, 1861	Manhattan	?
W. Kingsland Macy	Republican	1st	January 3, 1947 – January 3, 1951	Islip	?
Dan Maffei	Democratic	25th	January 3, 2009 – January 3, 2011	DeWitt	?
Dan Maffei	Democratic	24th	January 3, 2013 – January 3, 2015	DeWitt	?
John Magee	Jacksonian	28th	March 4, 1827 – March 3, 1831	Bath	?
Walter W. Magee	Republican	35th	March 4, 1915 – May 25, 1927	Syracuse	Died.
Thomas F. Magner	Democratic	5th	March 4, 1889 – March 3, 1893	Brooklyn	?
Thomas F. Magner	Democratic	6th	March 4, 1893 – March 3, 1895	Brooklyn	?
Rowland B. Mahany	Republican	32nd	March 4, 1895 – March 3, 1899	Buffalo	?
James P. Maher	Democratic	3rd	March 4, 1911 – March 3, 1913	Brooklyn	?
James P. Maher	Democratic	5th	March 4, 1913 – March 3, 1919	Brooklyn	?
James P. Maher	Democratic	7th	March 4, 1919 – March 3, 1921	Brooklyn	?
Peter P. Mahoney	Democratic	4th	March 4, 1885 – March 3, 1889	Brooklyn	?
George R. Malby	Republican	26th	March 4, 1907 – July 5, 1912	Ogdensburg	Died.
Nicole Malliotakis	Republican	11th	January 3, 2021 – present	Staten Island	Incumbent
Meredith Mallory	Democratic	27th	March 4, 1839 – March 3, 1841	Hammondsport	?
Carolyn Maloney	Democratic	14th	January 3, 1993 – January 3, 2013	Manhattan	Redistricted and lost renomination to Nadler
Carolyn Maloney	Democratic	12th	January 3, 2013 – January 3, 2023	Manhattan	Redistricted and lost renomination to Nadler
Sean Patrick Maloney	Democratic	18th	January 3, 2013 – January 3, 2023	Cold Spring	Lost re-election to Lawler
Abijah Mann Jr.	Jacksonian	16th	March 4, 1833 – March 3, 1837	Fairfield	?
John Mannion	Democratic	22nd	January 3, 2025 – present	Geddes	Incumbent
Thomas J. Manton	Democratic	9th	January 3, 1985 – January 3, 1993	Sunnyside	?
Thomas J. Manton	Democratic	7th	January 3, 1993 – January 3, 1999	Sunnyside	?
Vito Marcantonio	Republican	20th	January 3, 1935 – January 3, 1937	Manhattan	?
Vito Marcantonio	American Labor	20th	January 3, 1939 – January 3, 1945	Manhattan	?
Vito Marcantonio	American Labor	18th	January 3, 1945 – January 3, 1951	Manhattan	?
Henry Markell	Anti-Jacksonian	16th	March 4, 1825 – March 3, 1829	Palatine	?
Jacob Markell	Federalist	14th	March 4, 1813 – March 3, 1815	Manheim	?
David O'Brien Martin	Republican	30th	January 3, 1981 – January 3, 1983	Canton	?
David O'Brien Martin	Republican	26th	January 3, 1983 – January 3, 1993	Canton	?
Frederick S. Martin	Whig	31st	March 4, 1851 – March 3, 1853	Olean	?
Henry C. Martindale	Democratic-Republican	18th	March 4, 1823 – March 3, 1825	Sandy Hill	?
Henry C. Martindale	Anti-Jacksonian	18th	March 4, 1825 – March 3, 1829	Sandy Hill	?
Henry C. Martindale	Anti-Jacksonian	18th	March 4, 1829 – March 3, 1831	Sandy Hill	?
Henry C. Martindale	Anti-Masonic	12th	March 4, 1833 – March 3, 1835	Sandy Hill	?
Dudley Marvin	Democratic-Republican	26th	March 4, 1823 – March 3, 1825	Canandaigua	?
Dudley Marvin	Anti-Jacksonian	26th	March 4, 1825 – March 3, 1829	Canandaigua	?
Dudley Marvin	Whig	31st	March 4, 1847 – March 3, 1849	Canandaigua	?
Francis Marvin	Republican	17th	March 4, 1893 – March 3, 1895	Port Jervis	?
James M. Marvin	Republican	18th	March 4, 1863 – March 3, 1869	Saratoga Springs	?
Richard P. Marvin	Whig	31st	March 4, 1837 – March 3, 1841	Jamestown	?
Joseph Mason	Republican	24th	March 4, 1879 – March 3, 1883	Hamilton	?
William Mason	Jacksonian	21st	March 4, 1835 – March 3, 1837	Preston	?
Eric Massa	Democratic	29th	January 3, 2009 – March 8, 2010	Corning	Resigned.
Josiah Masters	Democratic-Republican	10th	March 4, 1805 – March 3, 1809	Schaghticoke	?
Vincent Mathews	Federalist	14th	March 4, 1809 – March 3, 1811	Elmira	?
Orsamus B. Matteson	Whig	20th	March 4, 1849 – March 3, 1851	Utica	?
Orsamus B. Matteson	Whig	20th	March 4, 1853 – March 3, 1855	Utica	Resigned.
Orsamus B. Matteson	Opposition	20th	March 4, 1855 – February 27, 1857	Utica	Resigned.
Orsamus B. Matteson	Republican	20th	March 4, 1857 – March 3, 1859	Utica	?
James Maurice	Democratic	1st	March 4, 1853 – March 3, 1855	Maspeth	?
Thomas Maxwell	Jacksonian	25th	March 4, 1829 – March 3, 1831	Elmira	?
Mitchell May	Democratic	6th	March 4, 1899 – March 3, 1901	Brooklyn	?
Stephen L. Mayham	Democratic	15th	March 4, 1877 – March 3, 1879	Schoharie	?
John Maynard	Anti-Jacksonian	26th	March 4, 1827 – March 3, 1829	Ovid Village	?
John Maynard	Whig	25th	March 4, 1841 – March 3, 1843	Ovid Village	?
Carolyn McCarthy	Democratic	4th	January 3, 1997 – January 3, 2015	Mineola	?
Dennis McCarthy	Republican	23rd	March 4, 1867 – March 3, 1871	Syracuse	?
John H. McCarthy	Democratic	8th	March 4, 1889 – January 14, 1891	Manhattan	Resigned after being appointed as justice of the City Court of New York City.
Richard D. McCarthy	Democratic	39th	January 3, 1965 – January 3, 1971	Buffalo	?
Andrew Z. McCarty	Opposition	22nd	March 4, 1855 – March 3, 1857	Pulaski	?
Richard McCarty	Democratic-Republican	8th	March 4, 1821 – March 3, 1823	Coxsackie	?
George McClellan	Democratic	27th	March 4, 1913 – March 3, 1915	Chatham	?
George B. McClellan Jr.	Democratic	12th	March 4, 1895 – December 21, 1903	Manhattan	Resigned to become Mayor of New York City.
Robert McClellan	Democratic	8th	March 4, 1837 – March 3, 1839	Middleburg	?
Robert McClellan	Democratic	8th	March 4, 1841 – March 3, 1843	Middleburg	?
Anson G. McCook	Republican	8th	March 4, 1877 – March 3, 1883	Manhattan	?
Andrew McCord	Democratic-Republican	5th	March 4, 1803 – March 3, 1805	?	?
Richard C. McCormick	Republican	1st	March 4, 1895 – March 3, 1897	Jamaica	?
Robert C. McEwen	Republican	31st	January 3, 1965 – January 3, 1973	Ogdensburg	?
Robert C. McEwen	Republican	30th	January 3, 1973 – January 3, 1981	Ogdensburg	?
Christopher C. McGrath	Democratic	26th	January 3, 1949 – January 3, 1953	Manhattan	?
Raymond J. McGrath	Republican	5th	January 3, 1981 – January 3, 1993	Valley Stream	?
John M. McHugh	Republican	24th	January 3, 1993 – January 3, 2003	Pierrepont Manor	Resigned after being appointed U.S. Secretary of the Army.
John M. McHugh	Republican	23rd	January 3, 2003 – September 21, 2009	Pierrepont Manor	Resigned after being appointed U.S. Secretary of the Army.
Matthew F. McHugh	Democratic	27th	January 3, 1975 – January 3, 1983	Ithaca	?
Matthew F. McHugh	Democratic	28th	January 3, 1983 – January 3, 1993	Ithaca	?
James B. McKean	Republican	15th	March 4, 1859 – March 3, 1863	Saratoga Springs	?
John McKeon	Jacksonian	3rd	March 4, 1835 – March 3, 1837	Manhattan	?
John McKeon	Democratic	3rd	March 4, 1841 – March 3, 1843	Manhattan	?
Richard F. McKiniry	Democratic	23rd	March 4, 1919 – March 3, 1921	Manhattan	?
Thomas McKissock	Whig	9th	March 4, 1849 – March 3, 1851	Newburgh	?
Martin B. McKneally	Republican	27th	January 3, 1969 – January 3, 1971	Newburgh	?
Gregory McMahon	Republican	4th	January 3, 1947 – January 3, 1949	Queens	?
Michael McMahon	Democratic	13th	January 3, 2009 – January 3, 2011	Staten Island	?
William McManus	Anti-Jacksonian	9th	March 4, 1825 – March 3, 1827	Troy	?
Samuel McMillan	Republican	21st	March 4, 1907 – March 3, 1909	Lake Mahopac	?
Michael R. McNulty	Democratic	23rd	January 3, 1989 – January 3, 1993	Manhattan	?
Michael R. McNulty	Democratic	21st	January 3, 1993 – January 3, 2009	Manhattan	?
Charles McVean	Jacksonian	15th	March 4, 1833 – March 3, 1835	Canajoharie	?
James M. Mead	Democratic	42nd	March 4, 1919 – December 2, 1938	Buffalo	Resigned when elected to the U.S. Senate.
Edwin R. Meade	Democratic	5th	March 4, 1875 – March 3, 1877	Manhattan	?
Henry Meigs	Democratic-Republican	2nd	March 4, 1819 – March 3, 1821	Manhattan	?
Gregory W. Meeks	Democratic	6th	February 3, 1998 – January 3, 2013	Queens	Incumbent
Gregory W. Meeks	Democratic	5th	January 3, 2013 – present	Queens	Incumbent
David B. Mellish	Republican	9th	March 4, 1873 – May 23, 1874	Manhattan	Died.
Grace Meng	Democratic	6th	January 3, 2013 – present	Queens	Incumbent
Clinton L. Merriam	Republican	20th	March 4, 1871 – March 3, 1873	Locust Grove	?
Clinton L. Merriam	Republican	21st	March 4, 1873 – March 3, 1875	Locust Grove	?
Truman A. Merriman	Independent Democratic	11th	March 4, 1885 – March 3, 1887	Manhattan	?
Truman A. Merriman	Democratic	11th	March 4, 1887 – March 3, 1889	Manhattan	?
Edwin A. Merritt	Republican	26th	November 5, 1912 – March 3, 1913	Potsdam	Died.
Edwin A. Merritt	Republican	31st	March 4, 1913 – December 4, 1914	Potsdam	Died.
Matthew J. Merritt	Democratic	At-large	January 3, 1935 – January 3, 1945	Flushing	?
Arunah Metcalf	Democratic-Republican	12th	March 4, 1811 – March 3, 1813	Otsego	?
Henry B. Metcalfe	Democratic	1st	March 4, 1875 – March 3, 1877	Westfield	?
Herman A. Metz	Democratic	10th	March 4, 1913 – March 3, 1915	Brooklyn	?
Charles D. Millard	Republican	25th	March 4, 1931 – September 29, 1937	Tarrytown	Resigned when elected surrogate of Westchester County.
Stephen C. Millard	Republican	28th	March 4, 1883 – March 3, 1885	Binghamton	?
Stephen C. Millard	Republican	26th	March 4, 1885 – March 3, 1887	Binghamton	?
John Miller	Anti-Jacksonian	22nd	March 4, 1825 – March 3, 1827	Truxton	?
Killian Miller	Opposition	12th	March 4, 1855 – March 3, 1857	Hudson	?
Morris S. Miller	Federalist	16th	March 4, 1813 – March 3, 1815	Utica	?
Samuel F. Miller	Republican	19th	March 4, 1863 – March 3, 1865	Franklin	?
Samuel F. Miller	Republican	21st	March 4, 1875 – March 3, 1877	Franklin	?
Rutger B. Miller	Jacksonian	17th	November 9, 1836 – March 3, 1837	Utica	?
Warner Miller	Republican	22nd	March 4, 1879 – July 6, 1881	Herkimer	Resigned when elected to the U.S. Senate.
William E. Miller	Republican	42nd	January 3, 1951 – January 3, 1953	Lockport	?
William E. Miller	Republican	40th	January 3, 1953 – January 3, 1965	Lockport	?
William S. Miller	Know Nothing	3rd	March 4, 1845 – March 3, 1847	Manhattan	?
Charles S. Millington	Republican	27th	March 4, 1909 – March 3, 1911	Herkimer	?
Ogden L. Mills	Republican	17th	March 4, 1921 – March 3, 1927	Manhattan	?
Henry C. Miner	Democratic	9th	March 4, 1895 – March 3, 1897	Manhattan	?
Charles F. Mitchell	Whig	33rd	March 4, 1837 – March 3, 1841	Herkimer	?
Donald J. Mitchell	Republican	31st	January 3, 1973 – January 3, 1983	Herkimer	?
Henry Mitchell	Jacksonian	21st	March 4, 1833 – March 3, 1835	Norwich	?
John M. Mitchell	Republican	8th	June 2, 1896 – March 3, 1899	Manhattan	?
Samuel L. Mitchill	Democratic-Republican	2nd	March 4, 1801 – March 3, 1803	Manhattan	Resigned when elected to the U.S. Senate.
Samuel L. Mitchill	Democratic-Republican	3rd	March 4, 1803 – November 22, 1804	Manhattan	Resigned when elected to the U.S. Senate.
Samuel L. Mitchill	Democratic-Republican	2nd	December 4, 1810 – March 3, 1813	Manhattan	First elected to finish term of William Denning who failed to qualify.
Hosea Moffitt	Federalist	10th	March 4, 1813 – March 3, 1817	Nassau	?
John H. Moffitt	Republican	21st	March 4, 1887 – March 3, 1891	Chateaugay Lake	?
Marc Molinaro	Republican	19th	January 3, 2023 – January 3, 2025	Red Hood	Lost re-election to Riley.
Guy V. Molinari	Republican	17th	January 3, 1981 – January 3, 1983	Staten Island	Resigned.
Guy V. Molinari	Republican	14th	January 3, 1983 – December 31, 1989	Staten Island	Resigned.
Susan Molinari	Republican	14th	March 20, 1990 – January 3, 1993	Staten Island	Resigned.
Susan Molinari	Republican	13th	January 3, 1993 – August 2, 1997	Staten Island	Resigned.
Robert Monell	Democratic-Republican	15th	March 4, 1819 – March 3, 1821	Greene	?
Robert Monell	Jacksonian	21st	March 4, 1829 – February 21, 1831	Greene	Resigned to become Judge of the New York Sixth State Circuit Court.
James Monroe	Whig	3rd	March 4, 1839 – March 3, 1841	Manhattan	?
Ely Moore	Jacksonian	3rd	March 4, 1835 – March 3, 1837	Manhattan	?
Ely Moore	Democratic	3rd	March 4, 1837 – March 3, 1839	Manhattan	?
Joseph Morelle	Democratic	25th	November 13, 2018 – present	Irondequoit	Incumbent; First elected to finish term of Louise Slaughter
Christopher Morgan	Whig	24th	March 4, 1839 – March 3, 1843	Aurora	?
Edwin B. Morgan	Whig	25th	March 4, 1853 – March 3, 1855	Aurora	?
Edwin B. Morgan	Opposition	25th	March 4, 1855 – March 3, 1857	Aurora	?
Edwin B. Morgan	Republican	25th	March 4, 1857 – March 3, 1859	Aurora	?
John J. Morgan	Democratic-Republican	2nd	December 3, 1821 – March 3, 1823	Manhattan	?
John J. Morgan	Democratic-Republican	3rd	March 4, 1823 – March 3, 1825	Manhattan	?
John J. Morgan	Jacksonian	3rd	December 1, 1834 – March 3, 1835	Manhattan	?
Daniel Morris	Republican	25th	March 4, 1863 – March 3, 1867	Penn Yan	?
Thomas Morris	Federalist	10th	March 4, 1801 – March 3, 1803	?	?
John Morrissey	Democratic	5th	March 4, 1867 – March 3, 1871	Manhattan	?
Oliver A. Morse	Republican	19th	March 4, 1857 – March 3, 1859	Cherry Valley	?
Levi P. Morton	Republican	11th	March 4, 1879 – March 21, 1881	Manhattan	Resigned to become Minister to France.
William A. Moseley	Whig	32nd	March 4, 1843 – March 3, 1847	Buffalo	?
Luther W. Mott	Republican	28th	March 4, 1911 – March 3, 1913	Oswego	Died.
Luther W. Mott	Republican	32nd	March 4, 1913 – July 10, 1923	Oswego	Died.
Robert J. Mrazek	Democratic	3rd	January 3, 1983 – January 3, 1993	Huntington	?
Joseph Mruk	Republican	41st	January 3, 1943 – January 3, 1945	Buffalo	?
Nicholas Muller	Democratic	5th	March 4, 1877 – March 3, 1881	Manhattan	?
Nicholas Muller	Democratic	5th	March 4, 1883 – March 3, 1885	Manhattan	?
Nicholas Muller	Democratic	6th	March 4, 1885 – March 3, 1887	Manhattan	?
Nicholas Muller	Democratic	7th	March 4, 1899 – November 22, 1901	Manhattan	Resigned.
Joseph Mullin	Whig	19th	March 4, 1847 – March 3, 1849	Watertown	?
Abraham J. Multer	Democratic	14th	November 4, 1947 – January 3, 1953	Brooklyn	Resigned.
Abraham J. Multer	Democratic	13th	January 3, 1953 – December 31, 1967	Brooklyn	Resigned.
Gurdon S. Mumford	Democratic-Republican	2nd and 3rd	March 4, 1805 – March 3, 1809	Manhattan	?
Gurdon S. Mumford	Democratic-Republican	2nd	March 4, 1809 – March 3, 1811	Manhattan	?
Henry C. Murphy	Democratic	2nd	March 4, 1843 – March 3, 1845	Brooklyn	?
Henry C. Murphy	Democratic	2nd	March 4, 1847 – March 3, 1849	Brooklyn	?
James J. Murphy	Democratic	16th	January 3, 1949 – January 3, 1953	Staten Island	?
John M. Murphy	Democratic	16th	January 3, 1963 – January 3, 1973	Staten Island	?
John M. Murphy	Democratic	17th	January 3, 1973 – January 3, 1981	Staten Island	?
Scott Murphy	Democratic	20th	March 31, 2009 – January 3, 2011	Glens Falls	?
Ambrose S. Murray	Opposition	10th	March 4, 1855 – March 3, 1857	Goshen	?
Ambrose S. Murray	Republican	10th	March 4, 1857 – March 3, 1859	Goshen	?
William Murray	Democratic	9th	March 4, 1851 – March 3, 1853	Goshen	?
William Murray	Democratic	10th	March 4, 1853 – March 3, 1855	Goshen	?
Jerrold Nadler	Democratic	17th	November 3, 1992 – January 3, 1993	Manhattan	Incumbent
Jerrold Nadler	Democratic	8th	January 3, 1993 – January 3, 2013	Manhattan	Incumbent
Jerrold Nadler	Democratic	10th	January 3, 2013 – January 3, 2023	Manhattan	Incumbent
Jerrold Nadler	Democratic	12th	January 3, 2023 – present	Manhattan	Incumbent
Homer A. Nelson	Democratic	12th	March 4, 1863 – March 3, 1865	Poughkeepsie	?
William Nelson	Whig	7th	March 4, 1847 – March 3, 1851	Peekskill	?
John Nicholson	Democratic-Republican	10th	March 4, 1809 – March 3, 1811	Herkimer	?
Henry Nicoll	Democratic	3rd	March 4, 1847 – March 3, 1849	Manhattan	?
Archibald C. Niven	Democratic	9th	March 4, 1845 – March 3, 1847	Monticello	?
William H. Noble	Democratic	24th	March 4, 1837 – March 3, 1839	Cato	?
Robert Nodar Jr.	Republican	6th	January 3, 1947 – January 3, 1949	Queens	?
Michael N. Nolan	Democratic	16th	March 4, 1881 – March 3, 1883	Albany	?
Ebenezer F. Norton	Jacksonian	30th	March 4, 1829 – March 3, 1831	Buffalo	?
Nelson I. Norton	Republican	33rd	December 6, 1875 – March 3, 1877	Hinsdale	?
Henry J. Nowak	Democratic	37th	January 3, 1975 – January 3, 1983	Buffalo	?
Henry J. Nowak	Democratic	33rd	January 3, 1983 – January 3, 1993	Buffalo	?
Newton W. Nutting	Republican	24th	March 4, 1883 – March 3, 1885	Oswego	?
Newton W. Nutting	Republican	27th	March 4, 1887 – October 15, 1889	Oswego	Died.
James O'Brien	Independent Democratic	10th	March 4, 1879 – March 3, 1881	Manhattan	?
James H. O'Brien	Democratic	9th	March 4, 1913 – March 3, 1915	Brooklyn	?
Joseph J. O'Brien	Republican	38th	January 3, 1939 – January 3, 1945	East Rochester	?
Leo W. O'Brien	Democratic	32nd	April 1, 1952 – January 3, 1953	Albany	Resigned.
Leo W. O'Brien	Democratic	30th	January 3, 1953 – January 3, 1963	Albany	Resigned.
Leo W. O'Brien	Democratic	29th	January 3, 1963 – December 30, 1966	Albany	Resigned.
David J. O'Connell	Democratic	9th	March 4, 1919 – March 3, 1921	Brooklyn	?
David J. O'Connell	Democratic	9th	March 4, 1923 – December 29, 1930	Brooklyn	Died.
John J. O'Connor	Democratic	16th	November 6, 1923 – January 3, 1939	Manhattan	?
Caroline O'Day	Democratic	At-large	January 3, 1935 – January 3, 1943	Rye	?
James M.E. O'Grady	Republican	31st	March 4, 1899 – March 3, 1901	Rochester	?
Denis O'Leary	Democratic	2nd	March 4, 1913 – December 31, 1914	Douglaston	Resigned.
James A. O'Leary	Democratic	11th	January 3, 1935 – March 16, 1944	West New Brighton	Died.
Daniel O'Reilly	Democratic	2nd	March 4, 1879 – March 3, 1881	Brooklyn	?
Donald L. O'Toole	Democratic	8th	January 3, 1937 – January 3, 1945	Brooklyn	?
Donald L. O'Toole	Democratic	13th	January 3, 1945 – January 3, 1953	Brooklyn	?
Thomas J. Oakley	Federalist	4th	March 4, 1813 – March 3, 1815	Poughkeepsie	?
Thomas J. Oakley	Jacksonian	5th	March 4, 1827 – May 9, 1828	Poughkeepsie	Resigned after being appointed judge of the Superior Court of New York City.
Alexandria Ocasio-Cortez	Democratic	14th	January 3, 2019 – present	Bronx	Incumbent
Benjamin B. Odell Jr.	Republican	17th	March 4, 1895 – March 3, 1899	Newburgh	?
Moses F. Odell	Democratic	2nd	March 4, 1861 – March 3, 1863	Brooklyn	?
Moses F. Odell	Democratic	3rd	March 4, 1863 – March 3, 1865	Brooklyn	?
N. Holmes Odell	Democratic	12th	March 4, 1875 – March 3, 1877	White Plains	?
David A. Ogden	Federalist	18th	March 4, 1817 – March 3, 1819	Madrid	?
Woodson R. Oglesby	Democratic	24th	March 4, 1913 – March 3, 1917	Yonkers	?
J. Van Vechten Olcott	Republican	15th	March 4, 1905 – March 3, 1911	Manhattan	?
Abram B. Olin	Republican	13th	March 4, 1857 – March 3, 1863	Troy	?
Andrew Oliver	Democratic	26th	March 4, 1853 – March 3, 1857	Penn Yan	?
Daniel C. Oliver	Democratic	23rd	March 4, 1917 – March 3, 1919	Manhattan	?
Frank A. Oliver	Democratic	23rd	March 4, 1923 – June 18, 1934	Bronx	Resigned after being appointed justice of the Court of Special Sessions.
William M. Oliver	Democratic	27th	March 4, 1841 – March 3, 1843	Penn Yan	?
Harold C. Ostertag	Republican	41st	January 3, 1951 – January 3, 1953	Attica	?
Harold C. Ostertag	Republican	39th	January 3, 1953 – January 3, 1963	Attica	?
Harold C. Ostertag	Republican	37th	January 3, 1963 – January 3, 1965	Attica	?
Norton P. Otis	Republican	19th	March 4, 1903 – February 20, 1905	Yonkers	Died.
Richard Ottinger	Democratic	25th	January 3, 1965 – January 3, 1971	Pleasantville	?
Richard Ottinger	Democratic	24th	January 3, 1975 – January 3, 1983	Pleasantville	?
Richard Ottinger	Democratic	20th	January 3, 1983 – January 3, 1985	Pleasantville	?
Bill Owens	Democratic	23rd	November 3, 2009 – January 3, 2013	Plattsburgh	?
Bill Owens	Democratic	21st	January 3, 2013 – January 3, 2015	Plattsburgh	?
Major Owens	Democratic	12th	January 3, 1983 – January 3, 1993	Brooklyn	?
Major Owens	Democratic	11th	January 3, 1993 – January 3, 2007	Brooklyn	?
Sherman Page	Jacksonian	19th	March 4, 1833 – March 3, 1837	Unadilla	?
Rufus Palen	Whig	7th	March 4, 1839 – March 3, 1841	Fallsburg	?
Beriah Palmer	Democratic-Republican	11th	March 4, 1803 – March 3, 1805	?	?
George W. Palmer	Republican	16th	March 4, 1857 – March 3, 1861	Plattsburgh	?
John Palmer	Democratic-Republican	12th	March 4, 1817 – March 3, 1819	Plattsburgh	?
John Palmer	Democratic	13th	March 4, 1837 – March 3, 1839	Plattsburgh	?
Abraham X. Parker	Republican	19th	March 4, 1881 – March 3, 1885	Potsdam	?
Abraham X. Parker	Republican	22nd	March 4, 1885 – March 3, 1889	Potsdam	?
Amasa J. Parker	Democratic	20th	March 4, 1837 – March 3, 1839	Delhi	?
James S. Parker	Republican	29th	March 4, 1913 – December 19, 1933	Salem	Died.
John M. Parker	Opposition	27th	March 4, 1855 – March 3, 1857	Owego	?
John M. Parker	Republican	27th	March 4, 1857 – March 3, 1859	Owego	?
Herbert Parsons	Republican	13th	March 4, 1905 – March 3, 1911	Manhattan	?
Samuel Partridge	Democratic	22nd	March 4, 1841 – March 3, 1843	Elmira	?
John Paterson	Democratic-Republican	16th	March 4, 1803 – March 3, 1805	?	?
Thomas J. Paterson (Note: Surname often misspelled.)	Whig	28th	March 4, 1843 – March 3, 1845	Rochester	?
Thomas G. Patten	Democratic	15th	March 4, 1911 – March 3, 1913	Manhattan	?
Thomas G. Patten	Democratic	18th	March 4, 1913 – March 3, 1917	Manhattan	?
George W. Patterson	Republican	33rd	March 4, 1877 – March 3, 1879	Westerfield	?
Walter Patterson	Federalist	5th	March 4, 1821 – March 3, 1823	Ancram	?
William Patterson	Whig	29th	March 4, 1837 – August 14, 1838	Warsaw	Died.
Edward W. Pattison	Democratic	29th	January 3, 1975 – January 3, 1979	West San Lake	?
William Paulding Jr.	Democratic-Republican	2nd	March 4, 1811 – March 3, 1813	Manhattan	?
Bill Paxon	Republican	31st	January 3, 1989 – January 3, 1993	East Aurora	?
Bill Paxon	Republican	27th	January 3, 1993 – January 3, 1999	East Aurora	?
Sereno E. Payne	Republican	26th	March 4, 1883 – March 3, 1885	Auburn	?
Sereno E. Payne	Republican	27th	March 4, 1885 – March 3, 1887	Auburn	?
Sereno E. Payne	Republican	27th	December 2, 1889 – March 3, 1893	Auburn	?
Sereno E. Payne	Republican	28th	March 4, 1893 – March 3, 1903	Auburn	?
Sereno E. Payne	Republican	31st	March 4, 1903 – March 3, 1913	Auburn	?
Sereno E. Payne	Republican	36th	March 4, 1913 – December 10, 1914	Auburn	?
Jared V. Peck	Democratic	9th	March 4, 1853 – March 3, 1855	Port Chester	?
Luther C. Peck	Whig	30th	March 4, 1837 – March 3, 1841	Pike	?
Rufus W. Peckham	Democratic	14th	March 4, 1853 – March 3, 1855	Albany	?
Harmanus Peek	Democratic-Republican	13th	March 4, 1819 – March 3, 1821	Schenectady	?
Herbert Pell	Democratic	17th	March 4, 1919 – March 3, 1921	Manhattan	?
Guy R. Pelton	Opposition	3rd	March 4, 1855 – March 3, 1857	Manhattan	?
Edmund H. Pendleton	Anti-Jacksonian	5th	March 4, 1831 – March 3, 1833	Hyde Park	?
Bishop Perkins	Democratic	17th	March 4, 1853 – March 3, 1855	Manhattan	?
James B. Perkins	Republican	31st	March 4, 1901 – March 3, 1903	Rochester	Died.
James B. Perkins	Republican	32nd	March 4, 1903 – March 11, 1910	Rochester	Died.
Nathan D. Perlman	Republican	14th	November 2, 1920 – March 3, 1927	Manhattan	?
Eli Perry	Democratic	14th	March 4, 1871 – March 3, 1873	Albany	?
Eli Perry	Democratic	15th	March 4, 1873 – March 3, 1875	Albany	?
Andrew Petersen	Republican	9th	March 4, 1921 – March 3, 1923	Brooklyn	?
George Petrie	Independent Democratic	17th	March 4, 1847 – March 3, 1849	Little Falls	?
Peter A. Peyser	Republican	25th	January 3, 1971 – January 3, 1973	Irvington	?
Peter A. Peyser	Republican	23rd	January 3, 1973 – January 3, 1977	Irvington	?
Peter A. Peyser	Democratic	23rd	January 3, 1979 – January 3, 1983	Irvington	?
Theodore A. Peyser	Democratic	17th	March 4, 1933 – August 8, 1937	Manhattan	Died.
Joseph L. Pfeifer	Democratic	3rd	January 3, 1935 – January 3, 1945	Brooklyn	?
Joseph L. Pfeifer	Democratic	8th	January 3, 1945 – January 3, 1951	Brooklyn	?
William L. Pfeiffer	Republican	42nd	January 3, 1949 – January 3, 1951	Kenmore	?
William T. Pheiffer	Republican	16th	January 3, 1941 – January 3, 1943	Manhattan	?
Oliver Phelps	Democratic-Republican	17th	March 4, 1803 – March 3, 1805	?	?
Jonas P. Phoenix	Whig	3rd	March 4, 1843 – March 3, 1845	Manhattan	?
Jonas P. Phoenix	Whig	3rd	March 4, 1849 – March 3, 1851	Manhattan	?
Ray V. Pierce	Republican	32nd	March 4, 1879 – September 18, 1880	Buffalo	Resigned.
Wallace E. Pierce	Republican	31st	January 3, 1939 – January 3, 1940	Plattsburgh	Died.
Jeremiah H. Pierson	Democratic-Republican	3rd	December 3, 1821 – March 3, 1823	Ramapo	?
Job Pierson	Jacksonian	9th	March 4, 1831 – March 3, 1835	Schaghticoke	?
Otis G. Pike	Democratic	1st	January 3, 1961 – January 3, 1979	Riverhead	?
John R. Pillion	Republican	42nd	January 3, 1953 – January 3, 1963	Lackawanna	?
John R. Pillion	Republican	39th	January 3, 1963 – January 3, 1965	Lackawanna	?
John S. Pindar	Democratic	24th	March 4, 1885 – March 3, 1887	Cobleskill	?
John S. Pindar	Democratic	24th	November 4, 1890 – March 3, 1891	Cobleskill	?
Alexander Pirnie	Republican	34th	January 3, 1959 – January 3, 1963	Utica	?
Alexander Pirnie	Republican	32nd	January 3, 1963 – January 3, 1973	Utica	?
Nathaniel Pitcher	Democratic-Republican	12th	March 4, 1819 – March 3, 1823	Sandy Hill	?
Nathaniel Pitcher	Jacksonian	18th	March 4, 1831 – March 3, 1833	Sandy Hill	?
Edmund Platt	Republican	26th	March 4, 1913 – June 7, 1920	Poughkeepsie	Resigned after being appointed to the Federal Reserve Board.
Jonas Platt	Federalist	9th	March 4, 1799 – March 3, 1801	?	?
Thomas C. Platt	Republican	27th	March 4, 1873 – March 3, 1875	Owego	?
Thomas C. Platt	Republican	28th	March 4, 1875 – March 3, 1877	Owego	?
Bertram L. Podell	Democratic	13th	February 20, 1968 – January 3, 1975	Brooklyn	?
Theodore M. Pomeroy	Republican	25th	March 4, 1861 – March 3, 1863	Auburn	?
Theodore M. Pomeroy	Republican	24th	March 4, 1863 – March 3, 1869	Auburn	?
Benjamin Pond	Democratic-Republican	8th	March 4, 1811 – March 3, 1813	Schroon	?
Theodore L. Poole	Republican	27th	March 4, 1895 – March 3, 1897	Syracuse	?
James Porter	Democratic-Republican	19th	March 4, 1817 – March 3, 1819	Skaneateles	?
Peter A. Porter	Republican	34th	March 4, 1907 – March 3, 1909	Niagara Falls	?
Peter Buell Porter	Democratic-Republican	15th	March 4, 1809 – March 3, 1813	Buffalo	?
Peter Buell Porter	Democratic-Republican	21st	March 4, 1815 – January 23, 1816	Buffalo	Resigned after being appointed a commissioner under the Treaty of Ghent.
Timothy H. Porter	Anti-Jacksonian	28th	March 4, 1825 – March 3, 1827	Olean	?
Jotham Post Jr.	Federalist	2nd	March 4, 1813 – March 3, 1815	Manhattan	?
Clarkson Nott Potter	Democratic	10th	March 4, 1869 – March 3, 1873	New Rochelle	?
Clarkson Nott Potter	Democratic	11th	March 4, 1873 – March 3, 1875	New Rochelle	?
Clarkson Nott Potter	Democratic	12th	March 4, 1877 – March 3, 1879	New Rochelle	?
Orlando B. Potter	Democratic	11th	March 4, 1883 – March 3, 1885	Manhattan	?
Emory B. Pottle	Republican	26th	March 4, 1857 – March 3, 1861	Naples	?
David M. Potts	Republican	26th	January 3, 1947 – January 3, 1949	Manhattan	?
Adam Clayton Powell Jr.	Democratic	22nd	January 3, 1945 – January 3, 1953	Manhattan	?
Adam Clayton Powell Jr.	Democratic	16th	January 3, 1953 – January 3, 1963	Manhattan	?
Adam Clayton Powell Jr.	Democratic	18th	January 3, 1963 – January 3, 1971	Manhattan	?
Gershom Powers	Jacksonian	24th	March 4, 1829 – March 3, 1831	Auburn	?
Anning S. Prall	Democratic	11th	November 6, 1923 – January 3, 1935	West New Brighton	?
Harcourt J. Pratt	Republican	27th	March 4, 1925 – March 3, 1933	Highland	?
Harry H. Pratt	Republican	37th	March 4, 1915 – March 3, 1919	Corning	?
Ruth B. Pratt	Republican	17th	March 4, 1929 – March 3, 1933	Manhattan	?
Zadock Pratt	Democratic	8th	March 4, 1837 – March 3, 1839	Prattsville	?
Zadock Pratt	Democratic	11th	March 4, 1843 – March 3, 1845	Prattsville	?
John H. Prentiss	Democratic	19th	March 4, 1837 – March 3, 1841	Cooperstown	?
Cyrus D. Prescott	Republican	23rd	March 4, 1879 – March 3, 1883	Rome	?
Elizur H. Prindle	Republican	19th	March 4, 1871 – March 3, 1873	Norwich	?
Benjamin Pringle	Whig	30th	March 4, 1853 – March 3, 1855	Batavia	?
Benjamin Pringle	Opposition	30th	March 4, 1855 – March 3, 1857	Batavia	?
Cornelius A. Pugsley	Democratic	16th	March 4, 1901 – March 3, 1903	Peekskill	?
Joseph Pulitzer	Democratic	9th	March 4, 1885 – April 10, 1886	Manhattan	Resigned.
Meade Purdy	Democratic	22nd	March 4, 1843 – March 3, 1845	Norwich	?
Harvey Putnam	Whig	29th	November 7, 1838 – March 3, 1839	Attica	?
Harvey Putnam	Whig	33rd	March 4, 1847 – March 3, 1851	Attica	?
John A. Quackenbush	Republican	18th	March 4, 1889 – March 3, 1893	Stillwater	?
John F. Quayle	Democratic	7th	March 4, 1923 – November 27, 1930	Brooklyn	Died.
Lemuel E. Quigg	Republican	14th	January 30, 1894 – March 3, 1899	Manhattan	?
Jack Quinn	Republican	30th	January 3, 1993 – January 3, 2003	Hamburg	?
Jack Quinn	Republican	27th	January 3, 2003 – January 3, 2005	Hamburg	?
John Quinn	Democratic	11th	March 4, 1889 – March 3, 1891	Manhattan	?
Peter A. Quinn	Democratic	26th	January 3, 1945 – January 3, 1947	Manhattan	?
T. Vincent Quinn	Democratic	5th	January 3, 1949 – December 30, 1951	Queens	Resigned to become district attorney of Queens County.
Terence J. Quinn	Democratic	16th	March 4, 1877 – June 18, 1878	Albany	?
Benjamin J. Rabin	Democratic	24th	January 3, 1945 – December 31, 1947	Manhattan	Resigned when elected justice to the New York Supreme Court.
William Radford	Democratic	10th	March 4, 1863 – March 3, 1867	Yonkers	?
Edmund P. Radwan	Republican	43rd	January 3, 1951 – January 3, 1953	Buffalo	?
Edmund P. Radwan	Republican	41st	January 3, 1953 – January 3, 1959	Buffalo	?
John Raines	Republican	29th	March 4, 1889 – March 3, 1893	Canandaigua	?
Charles B. Rangel	Democratic	18th	January 3, 1971 – January 3, 1973	Manhattan	Retired.
Charles B. Rangel	Democratic	19th	January 3, 1973 – January 3, 1983	Manhattan	Retired.
Charles B. Rangel	Democratic	16th	January 3, 1983 – January 3, 1993	Manhattan	Retired.
Charles B. Rangel	Democratic	15th	January 3, 1993 – January 3, 2013	Manhattan	Retired.
Charles B. Rangel	Democratic	13th	January 3, 2013 – January 3, 2017	Manhattan	Retired.
George O. Rathbun	Democratic	25th	March 4, 1843 – March 3, 1847	Auburn	?
George W. Ray	Republican	21st	March 4, 1883 – March 3, 1885	Chenango	?
George W. Ray	Republican	26th	March 4, 1891 – September 11, 1902	Chenango	Resigned to become a United States District Judge.
John H. Ray	Republican	15th	January 3, 1953 – January 3, 1963	Staten Island	?
Leo F. Rayfiel	Democratic	14th	January 3, 1945 – September 13, 1947	Brooklyn	Resigned.
Henry J. Raymond	Republican	6th	March 4, 1865 – March 3, 1867	Manhattan	?
William C. Redfield	Democratic	5th	March 4, 1911 – March 3, 1913	Brooklyn	?
Daniel A. Reed	Republican	43rd	March 4, 1919 – January 3, 1945	Dunkirk	Died.
Daniel A. Reed	Republican	45th	January 3, 1945 – January 3, 1953	Dunkirk	Died.
Daniel A. Reed	Republican	43rd	January 3, 1953 – February 19, 1959	Dunkirk	Died.
Edward C. Reed	Jacksonian	22nd	March 4, 1831 – March 3, 1833	Homer	?
Tom Reed	Republican	29th	November 2, 2010 – January 3, 2013	Corning	?
Tom Reed	Republican	23rd	January 3, 2013 – May 10, 2022	Corning	?
Henry A. Reeves	Democratic	1st	March 4, 1869 – March 3, 1871	Greenport	?
Ogden R. Reid	Republican	26th	January 3, 1963 – March 22, 1972	Purchase	?
Ogden R. Reid	Democratic	26th	March 22, 1972 – January 3, 1973	Purchase	?
Ogden R. Reid	Democratic	24th	January 3, 1973 – January 3, 1975	Purchase	?
Joseph Y. Resnick	Democratic	28th	January 3, 1965 – January 3, 1969	Ellenville	?
Edwin R. Reynolds	Republican	31st	December 5, 1860 – March 3, 1861	Albion	?
Gideon Reynolds	Whig	12th	March 4, 1847 – March 3, 1851	Hoosick	?
John H. Reynolds	Democratic	14th	March 4, 1859 – March 3, 1861	Albany	?
Joseph Reynolds	Jacksonian	22nd	March 4, 1835 – March 3, 1837	Virgil	?
Thomas M. Reynolds	Republican	27th	January 3, 1999 – January 3, 2003	Springville	?
Thomas M. Reynolds	Republican	26th	January 3, 2003 – January 3, 2009	Springville	?
Kathleen Rice	Democratic	4th	January 3, 2015 – January 3, 2023	Garden City	Retired.
John Richards	Democratic-Republican	19th	March 4, 1823 – March 3, 1825	Warrensburg	?
David P. Richardson	Republican	29th	March 4, 1879 – March 3, 1883	Angelica	?
Fred Richmond	Democratic	14th	January 3, 1975 – August 25, 1982	Brooklyn	Resigned.
Jonathan Richmond	Democratic-Republican	20th	March 4, 1819 – March 3, 1821	Scipio	?
Ira E. Rider	Democratic	14th	March 4, 1903 – March 3, 1905	Manhattan	?
R. Walter Riehlman	Republican	36th	January 3, 1947 – January 3, 1953	Tully	?
R. Walter Riehlman	Republican	35th	January 3, 1953 – January 3, 1963	Tully	?
R. Walter Riehlman	Republican	34th	January 3, 1963 – January 3, 1965	Tully	?
Lewis Riggs	Democratic	22nd	March 4, 1841 – March 3, 1843	Homer	?
Samuel Riker	Democratic-Republican	1st	November 5, 1804 – March 3, 1805	Newtown	?
Samuel Riker	Democratic-Republican	1st	November 5, 1807 – March 3, 1809	Newtown	?
Josh Riley	Democratic	19th	January 3, 2025 – present	Ithaca	Incumbent
Daniel J. Riordan	Democratic	8th	March 4, 1899 – March 3, 1901	Manhattan	Died.
Daniel J. Riordan	Democratic	8th	November 6, 1906 – March 3, 1913	Manhattan	Died.
Daniel J. Riordan	Democratic	11th	March 4, 1913 – April 28, 1923	Manhattan	Died.
Thomas C. Ripley	Whig	12th	December 7, 1846 – March 3, 1847	Schaghticoke	?
Elijah Risley	Whig	31st	March 4, 1849 – March 3, 1851	Fredonia	?
Ellis H. Roberts	Republican	21st	March 4, 1871 – March 3, 1873	Utica	?
Ellis H. Roberts	Republican	22nd	March 4, 1873 – March 3, 1875	Utica	?
William R. Roberts	Democratic	5th	March 4, 1871 – March 3, 1875	Manhattan	?
William H. Robertson	Republican	10th	March 4, 1867 – March 3, 1869	Brooklyn	?
Reuben Robie	Democratic	30th	March 4, 1851 – March 3, 1853	Bath	?
Orville Robinson	Democratic	23rd	March 4, 1843 – March 3, 1845	Mexico	?
William E. Robinson	Democratic	3rd	March 4, 1867 – March 3, 1869	Brooklyn	?
William E. Robinson	Democratic	2nd	March 4, 1881 – March 3, 1885	Brooklyn	?
Howard W. Robison	Republican	37th	January 14, 1958 – January 3, 1963	Owego	?
Howard W. Robison	Republican	33rd	January 3, 1963 – January 3, 1973	Owego	?
Howard W. Robison	Republican	27th	January 3, 1973 – January 3, 1975	Owego	?
William B. Rochester	Democratic-Republican	20th	March 4, 1821 – March 3, 1823	Bath	Resigned upon appointment as Judge of the Eighth Circuit Court.
William B. Rochester	Democratic-Republican	28th	March 4, 1823 – April 21, 1823	Bath	Resigned upon appointment as Judge of the Eighth Circuit Court.
Lewis K. Rockefeller	Republican	27th	November 2, 1937 – January 3, 1943	Chatham	?
Hosea H. Rockwell	Democratic	28th	March 4, 1891 – March 3, 1893	Elmira	?
James A. Roe	Democratic	5th	January 3, 1945 – January 3, 1947	Flushing	?
Charles Rogers	Whig	14th	March 4, 1843 – March 3, 1845	Sandy Hill	?
Edward Rogers	Democratic	23rd	March 4, 1839 – March 3, 1841	Madison	?
George F. Rogers	Democratic	40th	January 3, 1945 – January 3, 1947	Rochester	?
John Rogers	Democratic	16th	March 4, 1871 – March 3, 1873	Black Brook	?
William F. Rogers	Democratic	32nd	March 4, 1883 – March 3, 1885	Buffalo	?
Angelo D. Roncallo	Republican	3rd	January 3, 1973 – January 3, 1975	Massapequa	?
John J. Rooney	Democratic	4th	June 6, 1944 – January 3, 1945	Brooklyn	Resigned.
John J. Rooney	Democratic	12th	January 3, 1945 – January 3, 1953	Brooklyn	Resigned.
John J. Rooney	Democratic	14th	January 3, 1953 – December 31, 1974	Brooklyn	Resigned.
Franklin D. Roosevelt Jr.	Liberal	20th	May 17, 1949 – January 3, 1951	Manhattan	?
Franklin D. Roosevelt Jr.	Democratic	20th	January 3, 1951 – January 3, 1955	Manhattan	?
James I. Roosevelt	Democratic	3rd	March 4, 1841 – March 3, 1843	Manhattan	?
Robert B. Roosevelt	Democratic	4th	March 4, 1871 – March 3, 1873	Manhattan	?
Erastus Root	Democratic-Republican	14th	March 4, 1803 – March 3, 1805	Delhi	?
Erastus Root	Democratic-Republican	12th	March 4, 1809 – March 3, 1811	Delhi	?
Erastus Root	Democratic-Republican	8th	December 26, 1815 – March 3, 1817	Delhi	?
Erastus Root	Jacksonian	11th	March 4, 1831 – March 3, 1833	Delhi	?
Max Rose	Democratic	11th	January 3, 2019 – January 3, 2021	Staten Island	Lost re-election to Malliotakis
Robert L. Rose	Whig	29th	March 4, 1847 – March 3, 1851	Allens Hill	?
Robert S. Rose	Democratic-Republican	26th	March 4, 1823 – March 3, 1825	Geneva	?
Robert S. Rose	Anti-Jacksonian	26th	March 4, 1825 – March 3, 1827	Geneva	?
Robert S. Rose	Anti-Masonic	26th	March 4, 1829 – March 3, 1831	Geneva	?
Benjamin S. Rosenthal	Democratic	6th	February 20, 1962 – January 3, 1963	Elmhurst	Died.
Benjamin S. Rosenthal	Democratic	8th	January 3, 1963 – January 3, 1983	Elmhurst	Died.
Benjamin S. Rosenthal	Democratic	7th	January 3, 1983 – January 4, 1983	Elmhurst	Died.
Henry H. Ross	Anti-Jacksonian	19th	March 4, 1825 – March 3, 1827	Essex	?
Robert T. Ross	Republican	5th	January 3, 1947 – January 3, 1949	Jackson Heights	?
Robert T. Ross	Republican	5th	February 19, 1952 – January 3, 1953	Jackson Heights	?
Albert B. Rossdale	Republican	23rd	March 4, 1921 – March 3, 1923	Manhattan	?
Joseph Rowan	Democratic	19th	March 4, 1919 – March 3, 1921	Manhattan	?
Frederick W. Rowe	Republican	6th	March 4, 1915 – March 3, 1921	Brooklyn	?
Peter Rowe	Democratic	18th	March 4, 1853 – March 3, 1855	Schenectady	?
Stephen A. Rudd	Democratic	9th	February 17, 1931 – March 31, 1936	Brooklyn	Died.
Charles H. Ruggles	Federalist	7th	March 4, 1821 – March 3, 1823	Kingston	?
David Rumsey	Whig	30th	March 4, 1847 – March 3, 1851	Bath	?
Jacob Ruppert	Democratic	15th	March 4, 1899 – March 3, 1903	Manhattan	?
Jacob Ruppert	Democratic	16th	March 4, 1903 – March 3, 1907	Manhattan	?
David A. Russell	Anti-Jacksonian	12th	March 4, 1835 – March 3, 1837	Salem	?
David A. Russell	Whig	12th	March 4, 1837 – March 3, 1841	Salem	?
Jeremiah Russell	Democratic	10th	March 4, 1843 – March 3, 1845	Saugerties	?
John Russell	Democratic-Republican	14th	March 4, 1805 – March 3, 1809	Cooperstown	?
Joseph Russell	Democratic	15th	March 4, 1845 – March 3, 1847	Warrensburg	?
Joseph Russell	Democratic	15th	March 4, 1851 – March 3, 1853	Warrensburg	?
Leslie W. Russell	Republican	22nd	March 4, 1891 – September 11, 1891	Ogdensburg	Resigned when elected as justice on New York Supreme Court.
William F. Russell	Democratic	11th	March 4, 1857 – March 3, 1859	Saugerties	?
Pat Ryan	Democratic	19th	August 23, 2022 – January 3, 2023	Gardiner	Incumbent
Pat Ryan	Democratic	18th	January 3, 2023 – present	Gardiner	Incumbent
Thomas J. Ryan	Republican	15th	March 4, 1921 – March 3, 1923	Manhattan	?
William Ryan	Democratic	16th	March 4, 1893 – March 3, 1895	Port Chester	?
William Fitts Ryan	Democratic	20th	January 3, 1961 – September 17, 1972	Manhattan	Died.
William H. Ryan	Democratic	32nd	March 4, 1899 – March 3, 1903	Buffalo	?
William H. Ryan	Democratic	35th	March 4, 1903 – March 3, 1909	Buffalo	?
William A. Sackett	Whig	27th	March 4, 1849 – March 3, 1853	Seneca Falls	?
Ebenezer Sage	Democratic-Republican	1st	March 4, 1809 – March 3, 1815	Sag Harbor	?
Russell Sage	Whig	13th	March 4, 1853 – March 3, 1855	Troy	?
Russell Sage	Opposition	13th	March 4, 1855 – March 3, 1857	Troy	?
Peter Sailly	Democratic-Republican	11th	March 4, 1805 – March 3, 1807	?	?
Katharine St. George	Republican	29th	January 3, 1947 – January 3, 1953	Tuxedo Park	?
Katharine St. George	Republican	28th	January 3, 1953 – January 3, 1963	Tuxedo Park	?
Katharine St. George	Republican	27th	January 3, 1963 – January 3, 1965	Tuxedo Park	?
Charles St. John	Republican	11th	March 4, 1871 – March 3, 1873	Port Jervis	?
Charles St. John	Republican	12th	March 4, 1873 – March 3, 1875	Port Jervis	?
Daniel B. St. John	Whig	9th	March 4, 1847 – March 3, 1849	Monticello	?
Thomas Sammons	Democratic-Republican	13th	March 4, 1803 – March 3, 1807	Johnstown	?
Thomas Sammons	Democratic-Republican	9th	March 4, 1809 – March 3, 1813	Johnstown	?
Archie D. Sanders	Republican	39th	March 4, 1917 – March 3, 1933	Stafford	?
Joshua Sands	Federalist	2nd	December 12, 1803 – March 3, 1805	Brooklyn	?
Joshua Sands	Anti-Jacksonian	2nd	March 4, 1825 – March 3, 1827	Brooklyn	?
John Sanford	Democratic	15th	March 4, 1841 – March 3, 1843	Amsterdam	?
John Sanford	Republican	20th	March 4, 1889 – March 3, 1893	Amsterdam	?
Jonah Sanford	Jacksonian	20th	November 30, 1830 – March 3, 1831	Oswego	?
Rollin B. Sanford	Republican	28th	March 4, 1915 – March 3, 1921	Albany	?
Stephen Sanford	Republican	18th	March 4, 1869 – March 3, 1871	Amsterdam	?
Alfred E. Santangelo	Democratic	18th	January 3, 1957 – January 3, 1963	Manhattan	?
George Santos	Republican	3rd	January 3, 2023 – December 1, 2023	Queens	Expelled.
John Savage	Democratic-Republican	12th	March 4, 1815 – March 3, 1819	Salem	?
John G. Sawyer	Republican	31st	March 4, 1885 – March 3, 1891	Albion	?
Richard Schell	Democratic	9th	December 7, 1874 – March 3, 1875	Manhattan	?
Abraham H. Schenck	Democratic-Republican	4th	March 4, 1815 – March 3, 1817	Fishkill Landing	?
Abraham M. Schermerhorn	Whig	28th	March 4, 1849 – March 3, 1853	Rochester	?
Simon J. Schermerhorn	Democratic	21st	March 4, 1893 – March 3, 1895	Schenectady	?
James H. Scheuer	Democratic	21st	January 3, 1965 – January 3, 1973	Bronx	?
James H. Scheuer	Democratic	11th	January 3, 1975 – January 3, 1983	Bronx	?
James H. Scheuer	Democratic	8th	January 3, 1983 – January 3, 1993	Bronx	?
John L. Schoolcraft	Whig	13th	March 4, 1849 – March 3, 1853	Albany	?
Cornelius C. Schoonmaker	Anti-Administration	4th	March 4, 1791 – March 3, 1793	?	?
Marius Schoonmaker	Whig	10th	March 4, 1851 – March 3, 1853	Kingston	?
John G. Schumaker	Democratic	2nd	March 4, 1869 – March 3, 1871	Brooklyn	?
John G. Schumaker	Democratic	2nd	March 4, 1873 – March 3, 1877	Brooklyn	?
Chuck Schumer	Democratic	16th	January 3, 1981 – January 3, 1983	Brooklyn	Resigned to run for U.S. Senate.
Chuck Schumer	Democratic	10th	January 3, 1983 – January 3, 1993	Brooklyn	Resigned to run for U.S. Senate.
Chuck Schumer	Democratic	9th	January 3, 1993 – January 3, 1999	Brooklyn	Resigned to run for U.S. Senate.
Martin G. Schuneman	Democratic-Republican	7th	March 4, 1805 – March 3, 1807	?	?
Philip J. Schuyler	Federalist	5th	March 4, 1817 – March 3, 1819	Rhinebeck	?
Pius L. Schwert	Democratic	42nd	January 3, 1939 – March 11, 1941	Buffalo	Died.
Jonathan Scoville	Democratic	32nd	November 12, 1880 – March 3, 1883	Buffalo	?
Henry J. Scudder	Republican	1st	March 4, 1873 – March 3, 1875	Manhattan	?
Townsend Scudder	Democratic	1st	March 4, 1899 – March 3, 1901	Oyster Bay	?
Townsend Scudder	Democratic	1st	March 4, 1903 – March 3, 1905	Oyster Bay	?
Tredwell Scudder	Democratic-Republican	1st	March 4, 1817 – March 3, 1819	Glen Head	?
Henry J. Seaman	Know Nothing	2nd	March 4, 1845 – March 3, 1847	Richmond	?
John A. Searing	Democratic	1st	March 4, 1857 – March 3, 1859	Hempstead Branch	?
Charles B. Sedgwick	Republican	24th	March 4, 1859 – March 3, 1863	Syracuse	?
John E. Seeley	Republican	24th	March 4, 1871 – March 3, 1873	Ovid	?
Dudley Selden	Jacksonian	3rd	March 4, 1833 – July 1, 1834	Manhattan	Resigned.
Lewis Selye	Independent Republican	28th	March 4, 1867 – March 3, 1869	Rochester	?
Joe Sempolinski	Republican	23rd	August 23, 2022 – January 3, 2023	Canisteo	Retired.
Jose Serrano	Democratic	18th	March 20, 1990 – January 3, 1993	Bronx	Retired.
Jose Serrano	Democratic	16th	January 3, 1993 – January 3, 2013	Bronx	Retired.
Jose Serrano	Democratic	15th	January 3, 2013 – January 3, 2021	Bronx	Retired.
Walter L. Sessions	Republican	31st	March 4, 1871 – March 3, 1873	Panama	?
Walter L. Sessions	Republican	32nd	March 4, 1873 – March 3, 1875	Panama	?
Walter L. Sessions	Republican	34th	March 4, 1885 – March 3, 1887	Panama	?
David L. Seymour	Democratic	12th	March 4, 1843 – March 3, 1845	Troy	?
David L. Seymour	Democratic	12th	March 4, 1851 – March 3, 1853	Troy	?
William Seymour	Jacksonian	20th	March 4, 1835 – March 3, 1837	Binghamton	?
Richard C. Shannon	Republican	13th	March 4, 1895 – March 3, 1899	Manhattan	?
Edgar A. Sharp	Republican	1st	January 3, 1945 – January 3, 1947	Patchogue	?
Peter Sharpe	Democratic-Republican	3rd	March 4, 1823 – March 3, 1825	Manhattan	?
Albert D. Shaw	Republican	24th	November 6, 1900 – February 10, 1901	Watertown	Died.
Porter Sheldon	Republican	31st	March 4, 1869 – March 3, 1871	Jamestown	?
James S. Sherman	Republican	23rd	March 4, 1887 – March 3, 1891	Utica	?
James S. Sherman	Republican	25th	March 4, 1893 – March 3, 1903	Utica	?
James S. Sherman	Republican	27th	March 4, 1903 – March 3, 1909	Utica	?
Judson W. Sherman	Republican	30th	March 4, 1857 – March 3, 1859	Angelica	?
Socrates N. Sherman	Republican	17th	March 4, 1861 – March 3, 1863	Ogdensburg	?
Eliakim Sherrill	Whig	10th	March 4, 1847 – March 3, 1849	Shandaken	?
Samuel Sherwood	Federalist	8th	March 4, 1813 – March 3, 1815	Delhi	?
Zebulon R. Shipherd	Federalist	12th	March 4, 1813 – March 3, 1815	Granville	?
Francis E. Shober	Democratic	17th	March 4, 1903 – March 3, 1905	Manhattan	?
Mark H. Sibley	Whig	26th	March 4, 1837 – March 3, 1839	Canandaigua	?
Daniel E. Sickles	Democratic	3rd	March 4, 1857 – March 3, 1861	Manhattan	?
Daniel E. Sickles	Democratic	10th	March 4, 1893 – March 3, 1895	Manhattan	?
Nicholas Sickles	Jacksonian	7th	March 4, 1835 – March 3, 1837	Kingston	?
Isaac Siegel	Republican	20th	March 4, 1915 – March 3, 1923	Manhattan	?
Peter Silvester	Pro-Administration	5th	March 4, 1789 – March 3, 1793	Kinderhook	?
Peter H. Silvester	Whig	11th	March 4, 1847 – March 3, 1851	Coxsackie	?
George A. Simmons	Whig	16th	March 4, 1853 – March 3, 1855	Kesseville	?
George A. Simmons	Opposition	16th	March 4, 1855 – March 3, 1857	Kesseville	?
James S. Simmons	Republican	34th	March 4, 1909 – March 3, 1913	Niagara Falls	?
Kenneth F. Simpson	Republican	17th	January 3, 1941 – January 25, 1941	Manhattan	?
William I. Sirovich	Democratic	14th	March 4, 1927 – December 17, 1939	Manhattan	Died.
Fred J. Sisson	Democratic	33rd	March 4, 1933 – January 3, 1937	Whitesboro	?
Charles R. Skinner	Republican	22nd	November 8, 1881 – March 3, 1885	Watertown	?
Louise Slaughter	Democratic	30th	January 3, 1987 – January 3, 1993	Fairport	Died
Louise Slaughter	Democratic	28th	January 3, 1993 – January 3, 2013	Fairport	Died
Louise Slaughter	Democratic	25th	January 3, 2013 – March 16, 2018	Fairport	Died
John I. Slingerland	Whig	13th	March 4, 1847 – March 3, 1849	Bethelem	?
Henry W. Slocum	Democratic	3rd	March 4, 1869 – March 3, 1873	Brooklyn	?
Henry W. Slocum	Democratic	At-large	March 4, 1883 – March 3, 1885	Brooklyn	?
James S. Smart	Republican	16th	March 4, 1873 – March 3, 1875	Cambridge	?
Albert Smith	Whig	33rd	March 4, 1843 – March 3, 1847	Batavia	?
Charles B. Smith	Democratic	36th	March 4, 1911 – March 3, 1913	Buffalo	?
Charles B. Smith	Democratic	41st	March 4, 1913 – March 3, 1919	Buffalo	?
Edward H. Smith	Democratic	1st	March 4, 1861 – March 3, 1863	Smithtown	?
George J. Smith	Republican	24th	March 4, 1903 – March 3, 1905	Kingston	?
Gerrit Smith	Free-Soil	22nd	March 4, 1853 – August 7, 1854	Petersboro	Resigned.
Henry P. Smith III	Republican	40th	January 3, 1965 – January 3, 1973	North Tonawanda	?
Henry P. Smith III	Republican	36th	January 3, 1973 – January 3, 1975	North Tonawanda	?
Horace B. Smith	Republican	27th	March 4, 1871 – March 3, 1873	Elmira	?
Horace B. Smith	Republican	28th	March 4, 1873 – March 3, 1875	Elmira	?
J. Hyatt Smith	Independent	3rd	March 4, 1881 – March 3, 1883	Brooklyn	?
John Smith	Democratic-Republican	1st	February 6, 1800 – February 23, 1804	?	Resigned when elected to the U.S. Senate.
Thomas F. Smith	Democratic	15th	April 12, 1917 – March 3, 1919	Manhattan	?
Thomas F. Smith	Democratic	16th	March 4, 1919 – March 3, 1921	Manhattan	?
William S. Smith	Federalist	17th	March 4, 1813 – March 3, 1815	Lebanon	?
Bertrand H. Snell	Republican	31st	November 2, 1915 – January 3, 1939	Potsdam	?
William W. Snow	Democratic	21st	March 4, 1851 – March 3, 1853	Oneonta	?
Homer P. Snyder	Republican	33rd	March 4, 1915 – March 3, 1925	Little Falls	?
Stephen J. Solarz	Democratic	13th	January 3, 1975 – January 3, 1993	Brooklyn	?
Gerald B.H. Solomon	Republican	29th	January 3, 1979 – January 3, 1983	Saratoga Springs	?
Gerald B.H. Solomon	Republican	24th	January 3, 1983 – January 3, 1993	Saratoga Springs	?
Gerald B.H. Solomon	Republican	22nd	January 3, 1993 – January 3, 1999	Saratoga Springs	?
Andrew L. Somers	Democratic	6th	March 4, 1925 – January 3, 1945	Brooklyn	Died.
Andrew L. Somers	Democratic	10th	January 3, 1945 – April 6, 1949	Brooklyn	Died.
Nathan Soule	Jacksonian	16th	March 4, 1831 – March 3, 1833	Fort Plain	?
George N. Southwick	Republican	20th	March 4, 1895 – March 3, 1899	Albany	?
George N. Southwick	Republican	20th	March 4, 1901 – March 3, 1903	Albany	?
George N. Southwick	Republican	23rd	March 4, 1903 – March 3, 1911	Albany	?
Elbridge G. Spaulding	Whig	32nd	March 4, 1849 – March 3, 1851	Buffalo	?
Elbridge G. Spaulding	Republican	32nd	March 4, 1859 – March 3, 1863	Buffalo	?
Ambrose Spencer	Anti-Jacksonian	21st	March 4, 1829 – March 3, 1831	Albany	?
Elijah Spencer	Democratic-Republican	21st	March 4, 1821 – March 3, 1823	Benton	?
James B. Spencer	Democratic	14th	March 4, 1837 – March 3, 1839	Fort Covington	?
John C. Spencer	Democratic-Republican	21st	March 4, 1817 – March 3, 1819	Canandaigua	?
Francis E. Spinner	Democratic	17th	March 4, 1855 – March 3, 1857	Mohawk	?
Francis E. Spinner	Republican	17th	March 4, 1857 – March 3, 1861	Mohawk	?
Francis B. Spinola	Democratic	10th	March 4, 1887 – April 14, 1891	Manhattan	Died.
John T. Spriggs	Democratic	23rd	March 4, 1883 – March 3, 1887	Utica	?
William G. Stahlnecker	Democratic	14th	March 4, 1885 – March 3, 1893	Yonkers	?
Gale H. Stalker	Republican	37th	March 4, 1923 – January 3, 1935	Elmira	?
Winifred C. Stanley	Republican	At-large	January 3, 1943 – January 3, 1945	Buffalo	?
John H. Starin	Republican	20th	March 4, 1877 – March 3, 1881	Fultonville	?
George A. Starkweather	Democratic	21st	March 4, 1847 – March 3, 1849	Cooperstown	?
Henry G. Stebbins	Democratic	1st	March 4, 1863 – October 24, 1864	New Brighton	Resigned.
John B. Steele	Democratic	11th	March 4, 1861 – March 3, 1863	Kingston	?
John B. Steele	Democratic	13th	March 4, 1863 – March 3, 1865	Kingston	?
Elise Stefanik	Republican	21st	January 3, 2015 – present	Watertown	Incumbent
Charles I. Stengle	Democratic	6th	March 4, 1923 – March 3, 1925	Brooklyn	?
Abraham P. Stephens	Democratic	7th	March 4, 1851 – March 3, 1853	Nyack	?
Micah Sterling	Federalist	18th	March 4, 1821 – March 3, 1823	Watertown	?
Lemuel Stetson	Democratic	15th	March 4, 1843 – March 3, 1845	Kesseville	?
Robert S. Stevens	Democratic	31st	March 4, 1883 – March 3, 1885	Attica	?
John K. Stewart	Republican	21st	March 4, 1899 – March 3, 1903	Amsterdam	?
Thomas E. Stewart	Republican	6th	March 4, 1867 – March 3, 1869	Manhattan	?
Moses D. Stivers	Republican	15th	March 4, 1889 – March 3, 1891	Manhattan	?
Frederic Storm	Republican	1st	March 4, 1901 – March 3, 1903	Bayside	?
Henry R. Storrs	Federalist	16th	March 4, 1817 – March 3, 1821	Whitestown	?
Henry R. Storrs	Federalist	14th	March 4, 1823 – March 3, 1825	Whitestown	?
Henry R. Storrs	Anti-Jacksonian	14th	March 4, 1825 – March 3, 1829	Whitestown	?
Henry R. Storrs	Anti-Jacksonian	14th	March 4, 1829 – March 3, 1831	Whitestown	?
Silas Stow	Democratic-Republican	10th	March 4, 1811 – March 3, 1813	Lowville	?
John G. Stower	Jacksonian	22nd	March 4, 1827 – March 3, 1829	Hamilton	?
James S.T. Stranahan	Opposition	2nd	March 4, 1855 – March 3, 1857	Brooklyn	?
Samuel S. Stratton	Democratic	32nd	January 3, 1959 – January 3, 1963	Schenectady	?
Samuel S. Stratton	Democratic	35th	January 3, 1963 – January 3, 1971	Schenectady	?
Samuel S. Stratton	Democratic	29th	January 3, 1971 – January 3, 1973	Schenectady	?
Samuel S. Stratton	Democratic	28th	January 3, 1973 – January 3, 1983	Schenectady	?
Samuel S. Stratton	Democratic	23rd	January 3, 1983 – January 3, 1989	Schenectady	?
Isidor Straus	Democratic	15th	January 30, 1894 – March 3, 1895	Manhattan	?
Randall S. Street	Federalist	4th	March 4, 1819 – March 3, 1821	Poughkeepsie	?
James Strong	Federalist	5th	March 4, 1819 – March 3, 1821	Hudson	?
James Strong	Federalist	8th	March 4, 1823 – March 3, 1825	Hudson	?
James Strong	Anti-Jacksonian	8th	March 4, 1825 – March 3, 1829	Hudson	?
James Strong	Anti-Jacksonian	8th	March 4, 1829 – March 3, 1831	Hudson	?
Selah B. Strong	Democratic	1st	March 4, 1843 – March 3, 1845	Setauket	?
Stephen Strong	Democratic	22nd	March 4, 1845 – March 3, 1847	Owego	?
Theron R. Strong	Democratic	25th	March 4, 1839 – March 3, 1841	Palmyra	?
Elmer E. Studley	Democratic	At-large	March 4, 1933 – January 3, 1935	Flushing	?
Christopher D. Sullivan	Democratic	13th	March 4, 1917 – January 3, 1941	Manhattan	?
Timothy D. Sullivan	Democratic	8th	March 4, 1903 – July 27, 1906	Manhattan	Resigned.
Timothy D. Sullivan	Democratic	13th	March 4, 1913 – August 31, 1913	Manhattan	Died.
William Sulzer	Democratic	11th	March 4, 1895 – March 3, 1903	Manhattan	Resigned to become Governor of New York.
William Sulzer	Democratic	10th	March 4, 1903 – December 31, 1912	Manhattan	Resigned to become Governor of New York.
Tom Suozzi	Democratic	3rd	January 3, 2017 – January 3, 2023	Glen Cove	Retired to run for governor of New York.
Tom Suozzi	Democratic	3rd	February 13, 2024 – present	Glen Cove	Incumbent; Elected to finish the term of George Santos.
Josiah Sutherland	Democratic	11th	March 4, 1851 – March 3, 1853	Hudson	?
Edward Swann	Democratic	10th	November 4, 1902 – March 3, 1903	Manhattan	?
Peter Swart	Democratic-Republican	13th	March 4, 1807 – March 3, 1809	Schoharie	?
John E. Sweeney	Republican	22nd	January 3, 1999 – January 3, 2003	Clifton Park	?
John E. Sweeney	Republican	20th	January 3, 2003 – January 3, 2007	Clifton Park	?
Thaddeus C. Sweet	Republican	32nd	November 6, 1923 – May 1, 1928	Phoenix	Died.
Oscar W. Swift	Republican	9th	March 4, 1915 – March 3, 1919	Brooklyn	?
John Swinburne	Republican	19th	March 4, 1885 – March 3, 1887	Albany	?
John Taber	Republican	36th	March 4, 1923 – January 3, 1945	Auburn	?
John Taber	Republican	38th	January 3, 1945 – January 3, 1953	Auburn	?
John Taber	Republican	36th	January 3, 1953 – January 3, 1963	Auburn	?
Stephen Taber	Democratic	1st	March 4, 1865 – March 3, 1869	Roslyn	?
Thomas Taber II	Jacksonian	5th	December 1, 1828 – March 3, 1829	Dover	?
Silas Talbot	Pro-Administration	10th	March 4, 1793 – June 5, 1794	Albany	Resigned to join the U.S. Navy.
Charles A. Talcott	Democratic	27th	March 4, 1911 – March 3, 1913	Utica	?
Charles A. Talcott	Democratic	33rd	March 4, 1913 – March 3, 1915	Utica	?
Frederick A. Tallmadge	Whig	5th	March 4, 1847 – March 3, 1849	Manhattan	?
James Tallmadge Jr.	Democratic-Republican	4th	June 6, 1817 – March 3, 1819	Poughkeepsie	Elected to finish the term of Representative-elect Henry B. Lee
Adolphus H. Tanner	Republican	15th	March 4, 1869 – March 3, 1871	Whitehall	?
Anthony F. Tauriello	Democratic	43rd	January 3, 1949 – January 3, 1951	Buffalo	?
Benjamin I. Taylor	Democratic	25th	March 4, 1913 – March 3, 1915	Harrison	?
Dean P. Taylor	Republican	29th	January 3, 1943 – January 3, 1945	Troy	?
Dean P. Taylor	Republican	33rd	January 3, 1945 – January 3, 1953	Troy	?
Dean P. Taylor	Republican	31st	January 3, 1953 – January 3, 1961	Troy	?
George Taylor	Democratic	2nd	March 4, 1857 – March 3, 1859	Brooklyn	?
John J. Taylor	Democratic	27th	March 4, 1853 – March 3, 1855	Owego	?
John W. Taylor	Democratic-Republican	11th	March 4, 1813 – March 3, 1823	Ballston Spa	?
John W. Taylor	Democratic-Republican	17th	March 4, 1823 – March 3, 1825	Ballston Spa	?
John W. Taylor	Anti-Jacksonian	17th	March 4, 1825 – March 3, 1829	Ballston Spa	?
John W. Taylor	Anti-Jacksonian	17th	March 4, 1829 – March 3, 1833	Ballston Spa	?
Nelson Taylor	Democratic	5th	March 4, 1865 – March 3, 1867	Manhattan	?
William Taylor	Jacksonian	23rd	March 4, 1833 – March 3, 1837	Manlius	?
William Taylor	Democratic	23rd	March 4, 1837 – March 3, 1839	Manlius	?
Isaac Teller	Whig	12th	November 7, 1854 – March 3, 1855	Beacon	?
Ludwig Teller	Democratic	20th	January 3, 1957 – January 3, 1961	Manhattan	?
Egbert Ten Eyck	Democratic-Republican	20th	March 4, 1823 – March 3, 1825	Watertown	Lost contested election.
Egbert Ten Eyck	Jacksonian	20th	March 4, 1825 – December 15, 1825	Watertown	Lost contested election.
Peter G. Ten Eyck	Democratic	28th	March 4, 1913 – March 3, 1915	Albany	?
Peter G. Ten Eyck	Democratic	28th	March 4, 1921 – March 3, 1923	Albany	?
Claudia Tenney	Republican	22nd	January 3, 2017 – January 3, 2019	New Hartford	Lost re-election.
Claudia Tenney	Republican	22nd	February 11, 2021 – January 3, 2023	New Hartford	Incumbent
Claudia Tenney	Republican	24th	January 3, 2023 – present	New Hartford	Incumbent
Herbert Tenzer	Democratic	5th	January 3, 1965 – January 3, 1969	Cedarhurst	?
John H. Terry	Republican	34th	January 3, 1971 – January 3, 1973	Syracuse	?
David Thomas	Democratic-Republican	7th	March 4, 1801 – March 3, 1803	Salem	Resigned to become New York State Treasurer.
David Thomas	Democratic-Republican	12th	March 4, 1803 – February 17, 1808	Salem	Resigned to become New York State Treasurer.
William D. Thomas	Republican	29th	January 30, 1934 – May 17, 1936	Hoosick Falls	Died.
Joel Thompson	Federalist	15th	March 4, 1813 – March 3, 1815	Smyrna	?
John Thompson	Democratic-Republican	7th	March 4, 1799 – March 3, 1801	Stillwater	Stillwater
John Thompson	Democratic-Republican	11th	March 4, 1807 – March 3, 1809	Stillwater	?
John Thompson	Democratic-Republican	8th	March 4, 1809 – March 3, 1811	Stillwater	?
John Thompson	Republican	12th	March 4, 1857 – March 3, 1859	Poughkeepsie	?
Enos T. Throop	Democratic-Republican	20th	March 4, 1815 – June 4, 1816	Auburn	Resigned.
John R. Thurman	Whig	15th	March 4, 1849 – March 3, 1851	Chestertown	?
George Tibbits	Federalist	10th	March 4, 1803 – March 3, 1805	Troy	?
Thomas Tillotson	Democratic-Republican	5th	March 4, 1801 – August 10, 1801	Red Hook	Resigned to become Secretary of State of New York.
Obadiah Titus	Democratic	5th	March 4, 1837 – March 3, 1839	Washington	?
Harold S. Tolley	Republican	34th	March 4, 1925 – March 3, 1927	Binghamton	?
Thomas A. Tomlinson	Whig	13th	March 4, 1841 – March 3, 1843	Keeseville	?
Arthur S. Tompkins	Republican	17th	March 4, 1899 – March 3, 1903	Nyack	?
Caleb Tompkins	Democratic-Republican	3rd	March 4, 1817 – March 3, 1821	White Plains	?
Paul Tonko	Democratic	21st	January 3, 2009 – January 3, 2013	Amsterdam	Incumbent
Paul Tonko	Democratic	20th	January 3, 2013 – present	Amsterdam	Incumbent
Richard J. Tonry	Democratic	8th	January 3, 1935 – January 3, 1937	Brooklyn	?
James H. Torrens	Democratic	21st	February 29, 1944 – January 3, 1947	Manhattan	?
Ritchie Torres	Democratic	15th	January 3, 2021 – present	Bronx	Incumbent
Charles A. Towne	Democratic	14th	March 4, 1905 – March 3, 1907	Manhattan	?
Edolphus Towns	Democratic	11th	January 3, 1983 – January 3, 1993	Brooklyn	?
Edolphus Towns	Democratic	10th	January 3, 1993 – January 3, 2013	Brooklyn	?
Dwight Townsend	Democratic	1st	December 5, 1864 – March 3, 1865	Clifton	?
Dwight Townsend	Democratic	1st	March 4, 1871 – March 3, 1873	Clifton	?
George Townsend	Democratic-Republican	1st	March 4, 1815 – March 3, 1819	Oyster Bay	?
Martin I. Townsend	Republican	17th	March 4, 1875 – March 3, 1879	Troy	?
Charles Tracey	Democratic	19th	November 8, 1887 – March 3, 1893	Albany	?
Charles Tracey	Democratic	20th	March 4, 1893 – March 3, 1895	Albany	?
Albert H. Tracy	Democratic-Republican	21st	March 4, 1819 – March 3, 1821	Buffalo	?
Albert H. Tracy	Democratic-Republican	22nd	March 4, 1821 – March 3, 1823	Buffalo	?
Albert H. Tracy	Democratic-Republican	30th	March 4, 1823 – March 3, 1825	Buffalo	?
Phineas L. Tracy	Anti-Jacksonian	29th	December 3, 1827 – March 3, 1829	Batavia	?
Phineas L. Tracy	Anti-Masonic	29th	March 4, 1829 – March 3, 1833	Batavia	?
Uri Tracy	Democratic-Republican	16th	March 4, 1805 – March 3, 1809	Oxford	?
Uri Tracy	Democratic-Republican	13th	March 4, 1809 – March 3, 1813	Oxford	?
Thomas Tredwell	Anti-Administration	1st	May 1791 – March 3, 1795	Smithtown	?
Lyman Tremain	Republican	At-large	March 4, 1873 – March 3, 1875	Albany	?
Bob Turner	Republican	9th	September 13, 2011 – January 3, 2013	Queens	?
Charles H. Turner	Democratic	6th	December 9, 1889 – March 3, 1891	Manhattan	?
Joel Turrill	Jacksonian	17th	March 4, 1833 – March 3, 1837	Oswego	?
Joseph H. Tuthill	Democratic	13th	March 4, 1871 – March 3, 1873	Ellenville	?
Selah Tuthill	Democratic-Republican	6th	??, 1821 – September 7, 1821	Goshen	?
William M. Tweed	Democratic	5th	March 4, 1853 – March 3, 1855	Manhattan	?
Asher Tyler	Whig	31st	March 4, 1843 – March 3, 1845	Ellicottville	?
Jacob Tyson	Democratic-Republican	2nd	March 4, 1823 – March 3, 1825	Castleton	?
Edwin S. Underhill	Democratic	33rd	March 4, 1911 – March 3, 1913	Bath	?
Edwin S. Underhill	Democratic	37th	March 4, 1913 – March 3, 1915	Bath	?
John Q. Underhill	Democratic	16th	March 4, 1899 – March 3, 1901	New Rochelle	?
Walter Underhill	Whig	4th	March 4, 1849 – March 3, 1851	Manhattan	?
Henry Vail	Democratic	9th	March 4, 1837 – March 3, 1839	Troy	?
William Valk	Know Nothing	1st	March 4, 1855 – March 3, 1857	Flushing	?
Henry Van Aernam	Republican	31st	March 4, 1865 – March 3, 1869	Franklinville	?
Henry Van Aernam	Republican	33rd	March 4, 1879 – March 3, 1883	Franklinville	?
James I. Van Alen	Democratic-Republican	8th	March 4, 1807 – March 3, 1809	Kinderhook	?
John E. Van Alen	Pro-Administration	7th	March 4, 1793 – March 3, 1795	?	?
John E. Van Alen	Federalist	7th	March 4, 1795 – March 3, 1799	?	?
Thomas J. Van Alstyne	Democratic	16th	March 4, 1883 – March 3, 1885	Albany	?
John Van Buren	Democratic	7th	March 4, 1841 – March 3, 1843	Kingston	?
Philip Van Cortlandt	Anti-Administration	3rd	March 4, 1793 – March 3, 1795	Croton	?
Philip Van Cortlandt	Democratic-Republican	3rd	March 4, 1795 – March 3, 1803	Croton	?
Philip Van Cortlandt	Democratic-Republican	4th	March 4, 1803 – March 3, 1809	Croton	?
Pierre Van Cortlandt Jr.	Democratic-Republican	3rd	March 4, 1811 – March 3, 1813	Peeksill	?
Peter Van Gaasbeck	Pro-Administration	4th	March 4, 1793 – March 3, 1795	?	?
Burt Van Horn	Republican	31st	March 4, 1861 – March 3, 1863	Newfane	?
Burt Van Horn	Republican	29th	March 4, 1865 – March 3, 1869	Newfane	?
George Van Horn	Democratic	24th	March 4, 1891 – March 3, 1893	Cooperstown	?
Isaac B. Van Houten	Jacksonian	2nd	March 4, 1833 – March 3, 1835	Clarkstown	?
John Peter Van Ness	Democratic-Republican	6th	October 6, 1801 – January 17, 1803	?	Seat forfeited after being named major of militia for the District of Columbia.
John Van S. L. Pruyn	Democratic	14th	December 7, 1863 – March 3, 1865	Albany	?
John Van S. L. Pruyn	Democratic	14th	March 4, 1867 – March 3, 1869	Albany	?
Henry Van Rensselaer	Whig	14th	March 4, 1841 – March 3, 1843	Ogdensburg	?
Jeremiah Van Rensselaer	Anti-Administration	6th	March 4, 1789 – March 3, 1791	?	?
Killian K. Van Rensselaer	Federalist	8th	March 4, 1801 – March 3, 1803	Albany	?
Killian K. Van Rensselaer	Federalist	9th	March 4, 1803 – March 3, 1809	Albany	?
Killian K. Van Rensselaer	Federalist	7th	March 4, 1809 – March 3, 1811	Albany	?
Solomon Van Rensselaer	Federalist	9th	March 4, 1819 – January 14, 1822	Albany	Resigned to become postmaster of Albany.
Stephen Van Rensselaer	Federalist	9th	March 12, 1822 – March 3, 1823	Albany	?
Stephen Van Rensselaer	Federalist	10th	March 4, 1823 – March 3, 1825	Albany	?
Stephen Van Rensselaer	Anti-Jacksonian	10th	March 4, 1825 – March 3, 1829	Albany	?
Robert B. Van Valkenburg	Republican	28th	March 4, 1861 – March 3, 1863	Bath	?
Robert B. Van Valkenburg	Republican	27th	March 4, 1863 – March 3, 1865	Bath	?
John Van Voorhis	Republican	30th	March 4, 1879 – March 3, 1883	Rochester	?
John Van Voorhis	Republican	31st	March 4, 1893 – March 3, 1895	Rochester	?
Charles H. Van Wyck	Republican	10th	March 4, 1859 – March 3, 1863	Bloomingburg	?
Charles H. Van Wyck	Republican	11th	March 4, 1867 – March 3, 1869	Bloomingburg	?
Charles H. Van Wyck	Republican	11th	February 17, 1870 – March 3, 1871	Bloomingburg	?
William W. Van Wyck	Democratic-Republican	4th	March 4, 1821 – March 3, 1823	Fishkill	?
William W. Van Wyck	Democratic-Republican	5th	March 4, 1823 – March 3, 1825	Fishkill	?
Aaron Vanderpoel	Jacksonian	8th	March 4, 1833 – March 3, 1837	Kinderhook	?
Aaron Vanderpoel	Democratic	8th	March 4, 1839 – March 3, 1841	Kinderhook	?
Abraham Vanderveer	Democratic	2nd	March 4, 1837 – March 3, 1839	Brooklyn	?
William D. Veeder	Democratic	2nd	March 4, 1877 – March 3, 1879	Brooklyn	?
John H. G. Vehslage	Democratic	7th	March 4, 1897 – March 3, 1899	Manhattan	?
Nydia Velázquez	Democratic	12th	January 3, 1993 – January 3, 2013	Brooklyn	Incumbent
Nydia Velázquez	Democratic	7th	January 3, 2013 – present	Brooklyn	Incumbent
Daniel C. Verplanck	Democratic-Republican	6th	October 17, 1803 – March 3, 1809	Fishkill	?
Gulian C. Verplanck	Jacksonian	3rd	March 4, 1825 – March 3, 1833	Manhattan	?
Chauncey Vibbard	Democratic	18th	March 4, 1861 – March 3, 1863	Schenectady	?
Egbert L. Viele	Democratic	13th	March 4, 1885 – March 3, 1887	Manhattan	?
Lester D. Volk	Republican	10th	November 2, 1920 – March 3, 1923	Brooklyn	?
Edward B. Vreeland	Republican	34th	November 7, 1899 – March 3, 1903	Salamanca	?
Edward B. Vreeland	Republican	37th	March 4, 1903 – March 3, 1913	Salamanca	?
James Wolcott Wadsworth	Republican	27th	November 8, 1881 – March 3, 1885	Geneseo	?
James Wolcott Wadsworth	Republican	31st	March 4, 1891 – March 3, 1893	Geneseo	?
James Wolcott Wadsworth	Republican	30th	March 4, 1893 – March 3, 1903	Geneseo	?
James Wolcott Wadsworth	Republican	34th	March 4, 1903 – March 3, 1907	Geneseo	?
James W. Wadsworth Jr.	Republican	39th	March 4, 1933 – January 3, 1945	Geneseo	?
James W. Wadsworth Jr.	Republican	41st	January 3, 1945 – January 3, 1951	Geneseo	?
Peter Joseph Wagner	Whig	15th	March 4, 1839 – March 3, 1841	Fort Plain	?
J. Mayhew Wainwright	Republican	25th	March 4, 1923 – March 3, 1931	Rye	?
Stuyvesant Wainwright	Republican	1st	January 3, 1953 – January 3, 1961	Wainscott	?
Abram Wakeman	Whig	8th	March 4, 1855 – March 3, 1857	Manhattan	?
Seth Wakeman	Republican	29th	March 4, 1871 – March 3, 1873	Batavia	?
Henry S. Walbridge	Whig	26th	March 4, 1851 – March 3, 1853	Ithaca	?
Hiram Walbridge	Democratic	3rd	March 4, 1853 – March 3, 1855	Manhattan	?
Hiram Walden	Democratic	21st	March 4, 1849 – March 3, 1851	Waldensville	?
George E. Waldo	Republican	5th	March 4, 1905 – March 3, 1909	Brooklyn	?
Alton R. Waldon Jr.	Democratic	6th	June 10, 1986 – January 3, 1987	Cambria Heights	?
William F. Waldow	Republican	42nd	March 4, 1917 – March 3, 1919	Buffalo	?
Benjamin Walker	Federalist	9th	March 4, 1801 – March 3, 1803	?	?
Charles C. B. Walker	Democratic	29th	March 4, 1875 – March 3, 1877	Corning	?
William A. Walker	Democratic	7th	March 4, 1853 – March 3, 1855	Manhattan	?
William Wall	Republican	5th	March 4, 1861 – March 3, 1863	Brooklyn	?
William C. Wallace	Republican	3rd	March 4, 1889 – March 3, 1891	Brooklyn	?
Samuel Wallin	Republican	30th	March 4, 1913 – March 3, 1915	Amsterdam	?
James J. Walsh	Democratic	8th	March 4, 1895 – June 2, 1896	Manhattan	Lost election contest to John M. Mitchell.
James T. Walsh	Republican	27th	January 3, 1989 – January 3, 1993	Syracuse	?
James T. Walsh	Republican	25th	January 3, 1993 – January 3, 2009	Syracuse	?
Michael Walsh	Democratic	4th	March 4, 1853 – March 3, 1855	Manhattan	?
William F. Walsh	Republican	33rd	January 3, 1973 – January 3, 1979	Syracuse	?
Reuben H. Walworth	Democratic-Republican	12th	March 4, 1821 – March 3, 1823	Plattsburgh	?
Aaron Ward	Anti-Jacksonian	4th	March 4, 1825 – March 3, 1829	Mount Pleasant	?
Aaron Ward	Jacksonian	4th	March 4, 1831 – March 3, 1837	Mount Pleasant	?
Aaron Ward	Democratic	4th	March 4, 1841 – March 3, 1843	Mount Pleasant	?
Charles B. Ward	Republican	27th	March 4, 1915 – March 3, 1925	Debruce	?
Elijah Ward	Democratic	7th	March 4, 1857 – March 3, 1859	Manhattan	?
Elijah Ward	Democratic	7th	March 4, 1861 – March 3, 1863	Manhattan	?
Elijah Ward	Democratic	6th	March 4, 1863 – March 3, 1865	Manhattan	?
Elijah Ward	Democratic	8th	March 4, 1875 – March 3, 1877	Manhattan	?
Hamilton Ward	Republican	27th	March 4, 1865 – March 3, 1871	Belmont	?
Jonathan Ward	Democratic-Republican	3rd	March 4, 1815 – March 3, 1817	New Rochelle	?
William L. Ward	Republican	16th	March 4, 1897 – March 3, 1899	Port Chester	?
Daniel Wardwell	Jacksonian	20th	March 4, 1831 – March 3, 1833	Mannsville	?
Daniel Wardwell	Jacksonian	18th	March 4, 1833 – March 3, 1837	Mannsville	?
J. De Witt Warner	Democratic	11th	March 4, 1891 – March 3, 1893	Manhattan	?
J. De Witt Warner	Democratic	13th	March 4, 1893 – March 3, 1895	Manhattan	?
Cornelius Warren	Whig	8th	March 4, 1847 – March 3, 1849	Cold Spring	?
Joseph M. Warren	Democratic	15th	March 4, 1871 – March 3, 1873	Troy	?
John Watts	Pro-Administration	2nd	March 4, 1793 – March 3, 1795	?	?
John B. Weber	Republican	33rd	March 4, 1885 – March 3, 1889	Buffalo	?
Anthony Weiner	Democratic	9th	January 3, 1999 – June 21, 2011	Queens	Resigned due to a personal scandal.
Jessica M. Weis	Republican	38th	January 3, 1959 – January 3, 1963	Rochester	?
Theodore S. Weiss	Democratic	20th	January 3, 1977 – January 3, 1983	Manhattan	Died.
Theodore S. Weiss	Democratic	17th	January 3, 1983 – September 14, 1992	Manhattan	Died.
Royal H. Weller	Democratic	21st	March 4, 1923 – March 1, 1929	Manhattan	Died.
Alfred Wells	Republican	27th	March 4, 1859 – March 3, 1861	Ithaca	?
John Wells	Whig	16th	March 4, 1851 – March 3, 1853	Johnstown	?
Edward Wemple	Democratic	20th	March 4, 1883 – March 3, 1885	Fultonsville	?
Peter H. Wendover	Democratic-Republican	2nd	March 4, 1815 – March 3, 1821	Manhattan	?
George West	Republican	20th	March 4, 1881 – March 3, 1883	Ballston Spa	?
George West	Republican	20th	March 4, 1885 – March 3, 1889	Ballston Spa	?
Theodoric R. Westbrook	Democratic	11th	March 4, 1853 – March 3, 1855	Kingston	?
Rensselaer Westerlo	Federalist	9th	March 4, 1817 – March 3, 1819	Albany	?
John M. Wever	Republican	21st	March 4, 1891 – March 3, 1893	Plattsburgh	?
John M. Wever	Republican	23rd	March 4, 1893 – March 3, 1895	Plattsburgh	?
Reuben Whallon	Jacksonian	13th	March 4, 1833 – March 3, 1835	Split Rock	?
J. Ernest Wharton	Republican	30th	January 3, 1951 – January 3, 1953	Richmondville	?
J. Ernest Wharton	Republican	29th	January 3, 1953 – January 3, 1963	Richmondville	?
J. Ernest Wharton	Republican	28th	January 3, 1963 – January 3, 1965	Richmondville	?
Horace Wheaton	Democratic	24th	March 4, 1843 – March 3, 1847	Pompey	?
Grattan H. Wheeler	Anti-Masonic	28th	March 4, 1831 – March 3, 1833	Wheeler	?
John Wheeler	Democratic	6th	March 4, 1853 – March 3, 1857	Manhattan	?
William A. Wheeler	Republican	16th	March 4, 1861 – March 3, 1863	Malone	?
William A. Wheeler	Republican	17th	March 4, 1869 – March 3, 1873	Malone	?
William A. Wheeler	Republican	18th	March 4, 1873 – March 3, 1875	Malone	?
William A. Wheeler	Republican	19th	March 4, 1875 – March 3, 1877	Malone	?
Bartow White	Anti-Jacksonian	5th	March 4, 1825 – March 3, 1827	Fishkill	?
Campbell P. White	Jacksonian	3rd	March 4, 1829 – ????, 1835	Manhattan	Resigned.
Hugh White	Whig	16th	March 4, 1845 – March 3, 1851	Cohoes	?
Stephen V. White	Republican	3rd	March 4, 1887 – March 3, 1889	Brooklyn	?
John O. Whitehouse	Democratic	13th	March 4, 1873 – March 3, 1877	Poughkeepsie	?
James L. Whitley	Republican	38th	March 4, 1929 – January 3, 1935	Rochester	?
Elias Whitmore	Anti-Jacksonian	21st	March 4, 1825 – March 3, 1827	Windsor	?
Thomas R. Whitney	Know Nothing	5th	March 4, 1855 – March 3, 1857	Manhattan	?
Frederick Whittlesey	Anti-Masonic	27th	March 4, 1831 – March 3, 1833	Rochester	?
Frederick Whittlesey	Anti-Masonic	28th	March 4, 1833 – March 3, 1835	Rochester	?
Eliphalet Wickes	Democratic-Republican	1st	March 4, 1805 – March 3, 1807	?	?
David Wilber	Republican	20th	March 4, 1873 – March 3, 1875	Milford	?
David Wilber	Republican	21st	March 4, 1879 – March 3, 1881	Milford	?
David Wilber	Republican	24th	March 4, 1887 – April 1, 1890	Milford	Died.
David F. Wilber	Republican	21st	March 4, 1895 – March 3, 1899	Oneonta	?
John M. Wiley	Democratic	33rd	March 4, 1889 – March 3, 1891	East Aurora	?
James W. Wilkin	Democratic-Republican	6th	December 4, 1815 – March 3, 1819	Goshen	?
Samuel J. Wilkin	Anti-Jacksonian	6th	March 4, 1831 – March 3, 1833	Goshen	?
William Willett Jr.	Democratic	14th	March 4, 1907 – March 3, 1911	Far Rockaway	?
Andrew Williams	Republican	18th	March 4, 1875 – March 3, 1879	Plattsburgh	?
Brandon Williams	Republican	22nd	January 3, 2023 – January 3, 2025	Sennett	Lost re-election to Mannion.
Isaac Williams Jr.	Democratic-Republican	15th	January 24, 1814 – March 3, 1815	Cooperstown	?
Isaac Williams Jr.	Democratic-Republican	15th	March 4, 1817 – March 3, 1819	Cooperstown	?
Isaac Williams Jr.	Democratic-Republican	13th	March 4, 1823 – March 3, 1825	Cooperstown	?
John Williams	Federalist	9th	March 4, 1795 – March 3, 1799	?	?
John Williams	Democratic	29th	March 4, 1855 – March 3, 1857	Rochester	?
Nathan Williams	Democratic-Republican	15th	March 4, 1805 – March 3, 1807	Utica	?
William Williams	Democratic	30th	March 4, 1871 – March 3, 1873	Buffalo	?
William R. Williams	Republican	35th	January 3, 1951 – January 3, 1953	Cassville	?
William R. Williams	Republican	34th	January 3, 1953 – January 3, 1959	Cassville	?
Benjamin A. Willis	Democratic	11th	March 4, 1875 – March 3, 1879	Manhattan	?
Westel Willoughby Jr.	Democratic-Republican	17th	December 13, 1815 – March 3, 1817	Herkimer	?
Francis H. Wilson	Republican	3rd	March 4, 1895 – September 30, 1897	Brooklyn	Resigned after becoming Postmaster of Brooklyn.
Frank E. Wilson	Democratic	5th	March 4, 1899 – March 3, 1903	Brooklyn	?
Frank E. Wilson	Democratic	4th	March 4, 1903 – March 3, 1905	Brooklyn	?
Frank E. Wilson	Democratic	4th	March 4, 1911 – March 3, 1913	Brooklyn	?
Frank E. Wilson	Democratic	3rd	March 4, 1913 – March 3, 1915	Brooklyn	?
Isaac Wilson	Democratic-Republican	29th	March 4, 1823 – January 7, 1824	Middlebury	Lost contested election.
Nathan Wilson	Democratic-Republican	12th	November 7, 1808 – March 3, 1809	Salem	?
Charles H. Winfield	Democratic	11th	March 4, 1863 – March 3, 1867	Goshen	?
Elisha I. Winter	Federalist	12th	March 4, 1813 – March 3, 1815	Peru	?
Lester L. Wolff	Democratic	3rd	January 3, 1965 – January 3, 1973	Great Neck	?
Lester L. Wolff	Democratic	6th	January 3, 1973 – January 3, 1981	Great Neck	?
Benjamin Wood	Democratic	3rd	March 4, 1861 – March 3, 1863	Manhattan	?
Benjamin Wood	Democratic	4th	March 4, 1863 – March 3, 1865	Manhattan	?
Benjamin Wood	Democratic	5th	March 4, 1881 – March 3, 1883	Manhattan	?
Bradford R. Wood	Democratic	13th	March 4, 1845 – March 3, 1847	Albany	?
Fernando Wood	Democratic	3rd	March 4, 1841 – March 3, 1843	Manhattan	?
Fernando Wood	Democratic	5th	March 4, 1863 – March 3, 1865	Manhattan	?
Fernando Wood	Democratic	9th	March 4, 1867 – March 3, 1873	Manhattan	Died.
Fernando Wood	Democratic	10th	March 4, 1873 – March 3, 1875	Manhattan	Died.
Fernando Wood	Democratic	9th	March 4, 1875 – February 14, 1881	Manhattan	Died.
John J. Wood	Jacksonian	2nd	March 4, 1827 – March 3, 1829	Clarkstown	?
Silas Wood	Federalist	1st	March 4, 1819 – March 3, 1823	Huntington	?
Silas Wood	Federalist	1st	March 4, 1823 – March 3, 1825	Huntington	?
Silas Wood	Anti-Jacksonian	1st	March 4, 1825 – March 3, 1829	Huntington	?
Walter A. Wood	Republican	17th	March 4, 1879 – March 3, 1883	Hoosick Falls	?
David Woodcock	Democratic-Republican	20th	March 4, 1821 – March 3, 1823	Ithaca	?
David Woodcock	Anti-Jacksonian	25th	March 4, 1827 – March 3, 1829	Ithaca	?
Stewart L. Woodford	Republican	3rd	March 4, 1873 – July 1, 1874	Brooklyn	Resigned.
Thomas M. Woodruff	Know Nothing	5th	March 4, 1845 – March 3, 1847	Manhattan	?
William Woods	Democratic-Republican	28th	December 1, 1823 – March 3, 1825	Bath	?
William W. Woodworth	Democratic	8th	March 4, 1845 – March 3, 1847	Hyde Park	?
George C. Wortley	Republican	32nd	January 3, 1981 – January 3, 1983	Fayetteville	Retired
George C. Wortley	Republican	27th	January 3, 1983 – January 3, 1989	Fayetteville	Retired
Silas Wright Jr.	Jacksonian	20th	March 4, 1827 – February 16, 1829	Canton	Resigned.
John W. Wydler	Republican	4th	January 3, 1963 – January 3, 1973	Garden City	?
John W. Wydler	Republican	5th	January 3, 1973 – January 3, 1981	Garden City	?
John B. Yates	Democratic-Republican	13th	March 4, 1815 – March 3, 1817	Utica	?
John Young	Whig	30th	November 9, 1836 – March 3, 1837	Geneseo	?
John Young	Whig	30th	March 4, 1841 – March 3, 1843	Geneseo	?
Richard Young	Republican	5th	March 4, 1909 – March 3, 1911	Brooklyn	?
Leo C. Zeferetti	Democratic	15th	January 3, 1975 – January 3, 1983	Brooklyn	?
Lee Zeldin	Republican	1st	January 3, 2015 – January 3, 2023	Shirley	Retired to run for governor of New York.
Herbert Zelenko	Democratic	21st	January 3, 1955 – January 3, 1963	Manhattan	?

== See also ==
- Elections in New York
- List of United States senators from New York
- New York's congressional delegations
- New York's congressional districts
