= Amy R. Juengling =

American suffragist (1886–1974)

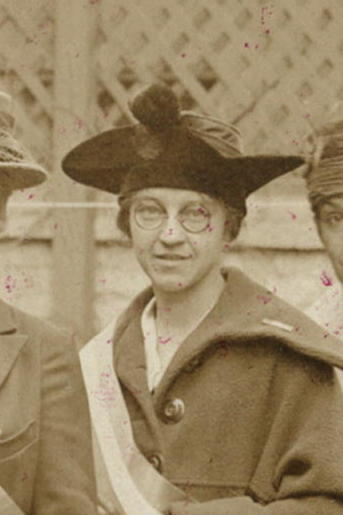
- Juengling in Washington, D.C. on November 10, 1917
- Born: Amy Regina Juengling; 1886; Buffalo, Erie County, New York
- Died: January 16, 1974 (aged 87–88); Lackawanna, Erie County, New York
- Occupations: Suffragist; Educator
- Political party: National Woman's Party

Amy Regina Juengling (1886 – January 16, 1974) was an American suffragist, educator, and women's rights activist who worked with the National Woman's Party to promote birth control and equal employment.

== Early life ==
Amy Regina Juengling was born in 1886 in Buffalo, Erie County, New York, to Emma Juengling (née Kibler; 1858–1954) and Frederick W. Juengling (1859–1947). She was the second oldest among her five siblings.

Juengling was born with a congenital dislocation of the left hip, which required her to wear steel leg braces throughout her childhood until the age of twelve, when she decided to remove them and teach herself to walk without them. She graduated from Buffalo Central High School in 1905, after which she took and passed the German Teacher's exam in June of the following year. From 1906 to 1911, she worked in a public school as a German teacher, earning US$420 per year. (Note: $420 (equivalent to $14,243 in 2023)) Despite her financial struggles, Juengling enrolled in a summer semester at Cornell University in 1910.

In August 1911, Juengling took a leave of absence from teaching to travel to Puerto Rico with her younger brother, Carl Frederick. Juengling returned to Buffalo in 1912 and continued her teaching career at Amherst Street School. In 1916, she was elected to the Young Men's Christian Association's executive committee, which promoted an "Americanization campaign" for immigrants who needed help learning English in order to obtain American citizenship.

== Activism ==
Juengling joined the New York State Woman Suffrage Association in 1916 as a scrutineer and was elected secretary of the Civic Education Association's Women's Department that same year. She was also elected as secretary for the Women's Department of the Civic Education Association the same year.

In the fall of 1917, she traveled to Washington, D.C., with her step-grandmother, Wanda, who wanted to visit the National Woman's Party headquarters and join a protest march. When Wanda was turned down due to her age and poor health, Juengling was persuaded to march. On November 10, she joined a picket line to protest the treatment of Alice Paul and other imprisoned suffragists. She was one of forty-one people arrested and charged of "obstructing traffic" two days later, though they all pled "not guilty". She was sentenced to thirty days at the Occoquan Workhouse in Lorton, Virginia, but only served one week. Two years after, Juengling took part in the "Watchfires of Freedom" protests, which began on January 1, 1919. She was arrested for a second time on February 9 and charged with "unlawfully setting fire to certain combustibles" on White House grounds.

In 1924, Juengling ran for U.S. Congress in New York's 42nd congressional district on the Socialist ticket, as she wanted a woman's name to be written on the ballot. She received 2,778 votes, compared to Republican runner-up Richard S. Persons' 25,236 and Democratic winner James M. Mead's 28,152.

In June 1926, Juengling represented the National Women's Party at the International Suffrage Alliance meeting in Paris, France's La Sorbonne, where she advocated employment equality. The following month, she traveled to Copenhagen, Denmark to study women engagement in the country's agricultural industry, mentored by Charles Josiah Galpin of the United States Department of Agriculture's Division of Rural Life.

In June 1929, Juengling founded Daffodil House as a country home in Eden to provide childcare for families living in South Buffalo, in response to the area's high concentration of single working parents. Although the company was successful in its first two years, it was closed down in 1932. Juengling's activity after 1930 received little coverage by local press; however, in March 1939, she spoke out against a bill pushing for a centralized education system at a legislative hearing, representing the Eden Valley School District.

== Later life and death ==
Later in life Juengling cared for her parents and wrote articles that were never published. She also volunteered at her local Presbyterian Church, speaking at Girls' Club meetings. In a 1971 interview, she criticized the women's liberation movement, saying, "It's too much a piecemeal approach with side issues like abortion. They should have just one approach, to get absolute equality for women under the Constitution. We certainly don't have it yet".

Juengling died on January 16, 1974 at the age of eighty-seven in Our Lady of Victory Hospital.

== See also ==
- List of suffragists and suffragettes
- List of women's rights activists
- Timeline of women's suffrage in the United States
