= John Cornelius Butler =

American politician (1887–1953)

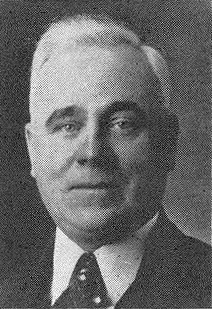

Member of the U.S. House of Representatives from New York
- In office January 3, 1951 – January 3, 1953
- Preceded by: Chester C. Gorski
- Succeeded by: Constituency abolished
- Constituency: 44th district
- In office April 22, 1941 – January 3, 1949
- Preceded by: Pius Schwert
- Succeeded by: Chester C. Gorski
- Constituency: 42nd district (1941–45); 44th district (1945–49)

Personal details
- Born: July 2, 1887 Buffalo, New York, U.S.
- Died: August 13, 1953 (aged 66) Buffalo, New York, U.S.
- Resting place: Forest Lawn Cemetery
- Party: Republican
- Spouse: Frances T. Pachowiak (m. 1908)
- Children: 3
- Nickname: Jack

John Cornelius Butler (July 2, 1887 – August 13, 1953) was a Republican politician from New York. He was most notable for his service as a member of the United States House of Representatives from 1941 to 1949 and 1951 to 1953.

== Early life ==
Butler was born in Buffalo, New York, on July 2, 1887. He attended the public schools of Buffalo and graduated from Buffalo's Central High School.

Butler worked in businesses on Buffalo's Lake Erie waterfront, primarily as an electrician. He later became active in several unions, including the longshoremen's, grain elevator employees', and electrical workers'.

== Political career ==
In 1941, Butler was elected to the U.S. House as a Republican in the special election held to fill the vacancy caused by the death of Pius Schwert. He served from April 22, 1941, until January 3, 1949. He failed to be reelected in 1948. After losing his seat, Butler was employed as sales manager for the Fire Equipment Sales Company and estimator for the Beacon Electrical Engineering and Construction Company, both of Buffalo.

In 1950, Butler was again elected to the U.S. House, and he served from January 3, 1951, to January 3, 1953. Because his district was eliminated after the 1950 census, in 1952 Butler ran in the 42nd District, where he lost the Republican nomination to John R. Pillion. As a member of Congress, Butler was best known for his opposition to the Saint Lawrence Seaway, which he believed would have a detrimental effect on Buffalo's shipping and cargo handling industries.

== Personal life and death ==
In 1908, Butler married Frances T. Pachowiak. They had three sons, George, John, and Henry.

After leaving Congress, Butler lived in retirement in Buffalo. He died in Buffalo on August 13, 1953. He was buried at Forest Lawn Cemetery in Buffalo.

U.S. House of Representatives
Preceded by Pius L. Schwert	Member of the U.S. House of Representatives from New York's 42nd congressional district April 22, 1941 – January 3, 1945	Succeeded by Walter G. Andrews
Preceded by District 44 created in 1945	Member of the U.S. House of Representatives from New York's 44th congressional district January 3, 1945 – January 3, 1949	Succeeded by Chester C. Gorski
Preceded by Chester C. Gorski	Member of the U.S. House of Representatives from New York's 44th congressional district January 3, 1951 – January 3, 1953	Succeeded by District 44 eliminated after the 1950 Census
