= New York's 42nd congressional district =

Former congressional district

Coordinates: 42°47′N 78°40′W

- Obsolete district
- Created: 1910
- Eliminated: 1960
- Years active: 1913–1963

The 42nd congressional district of New York was a congressional district for the United States House of Representatives in New York. It was created in 1913 as a result of the 1910 census. It was eliminated as a result of the 1960 census. It was last represented by John R. Pillion, who was redistricted into the 39th district.

== List of members representing the district ==
Representative	Party	Years	Cong ress	Electoral history	District location
District established March 4, 1913
Daniel A. Driscoll (Buffalo)	Democratic	March 4, 1913 – March 3, 1917	63rd 64th	Redistricted from the 35th district and re-elected in 1912. Re-elected in 1914. [data missing]	Parts of Erie
William F. Waldow (Buffalo)	Republican	March 4, 1917 – March 3, 1919	65th	Elected in 1916. Lost re-election.	Parts of Erie
James M. Mead (Buffalo)	Democratic	March 4, 1919 – December 2, 1938	66th 67th 68th 69th 70th 71st 72nd 73rd 74th 75th	Elected in 1918. Re-elected in 1920. Re-elected in 1922. Re-elected in 1924. Re-elected in 1926. Re-elected in 1928. Re-elected in 1930. Re-elected in 1932. Re-elected in 1934. Re-elected in 1936. Resigned to take seat in United States Senate.	Parts of Erie
Vacant		December 3, 1938 – January 2, 1939	75th		Parts of Erie
Pius Schwert (Buffalo)	Democratic	January 3, 1939 – March 11, 1941	76th 77th	Elected in 1938. Re-elected in 1940. Died.	Parts of Erie
Vacant		March 12, 1941 – April 21, 1941	77th		Parts of Erie
John C. Butler (Buffalo)	Republican	April 22, 1941 – January 3, 1945	77th 78th	Elected to finish Schwert's term. Re-elected in 1942. Redistricted to the 44th district.	Parts of Erie
Walter G. Andrews (Buffalo)	Republican	January 3, 1945 – January 3, 1949	79th 80th	Redistricted from the 40th district and re-elected in 1944. Re-elected in 1946. [data missing]	All of Niagara, Parts of Erie
William L. Pfeiffer (Kenmore)	Republican	January 3, 1949 – January 3, 1951	81st	Elected in 1948. Retired.	All of Niagara, Parts of Erie
William E. Miller (Lockport)	Republican	January 3, 1951 – January 3, 1953	82nd	Elected in 1950. Redistricted to the 40th district.	All of Niagara, Parts of Erie
John R. Pillion (Hamburg)	Republican	January 3, 1953 – January 3, 1963	83rd 84th 85th 86th 87th	Elected in 1952. Re-elected in 1954. Re-elected in 1956. Re-elected in 1958. Re-elected in 1960. Redistricted to the 39th district.	Parts of Erie
District dissolved January 3, 1963

== Election results ==
The following chart shows historic election results. Bold type indicates victor. Italic type indicates incumbent.

Year	Democratic	Republican	Other
1920	**James M. Mead**: 22,869	C. Hamilton Cook: 21,224	John H. Gibbons (Socialist): 3,218
1922	**James M. Mead**: 25,070	Louis J. Schwendler: 12,494	Jacob F. Griesinger (Socialist): 2,913
1924	**James M. Mead**: 28,152	Richard S. Persons: 25,236	Amy R. Juengling (Socialist): 2,778
1926	**James M. Mead**: 28,873	John Bruno McGrath: 19,362	Florence A. McCarthy (Socialist): 1,498
1928	**James M. Mead**: 44,373	C. Hamilton Cook: 31,785	
1930	**James M. Mead**: 33,195	Frank A. Dorn: 16,072	Clara Haushammer (Socialist): 1,308
1932	**James M. Mead**: 51,516	Henry Adsit Bull: 30,230	Marklet H. Harding (Socialist): 1,410
1934	**James M. Mead**: 49,251	Walter J. Lohr: 26,036	Marklet H. Harding (Socialist): 1,917
1936	**James M. Mead**: 57,132	Eugene D. Crooker: 32,395	Anthony Fitzgibbons: 6,840; John J. Szczepaniak: 3,384; Fred Riefler (Socialist): 1,304; Mattie Green (Communist) 168
1938	Pius L. Schwert: 39,287	John C. Butler: 36,326	John A. Ulinksi: 9,537; John E. Kralisz: 414; Connie Wilson (Socialist): 274
1940	**Pius L. Schwert**: 64,250	Edward F. Moss: 44,866	Mattie Green (Communist) 227
1942	Frank J. Caffery: 34,248	**John C. Butler**: 39,650	
1944	William Haeseler, Jr.: 62,590	**Walter G. Andrews**: 83,781	
1946	William R. Lupton: 43,028	**Walter G. Andrews**: 71,862	
1948	Mary Louise Nice: 69,290	William L. Pfeiffer: 75,842	Emanuel Fried (American Labor): 3,427
1950	Mary Louise Nice: 53,310	William E. Miller: 75,377	
1952	Chester C. Gorski: 81,201	John R. Pillion: 100,434	Charles T. Asque (American Labor): 238
1954	John J. Zablotny: 60,880	**John R. Pillion**: 82,707	
1956	James Kane, Jr.: 80,568	**John R. Pillion**: 117,178	David E. Gundlach (Liberal): 2,027
1958	Joseph R. Stiglmeier: 69,747	**John R. Pillion**: 99,799	
1960	Charles J. McCabe: 93,492	**John R. Pillion**: 122,073	James A. Peck (Liberal): 4,979
