= Richard D. McCarthy =

American politician (1927–1995)

Richard “Max” McCarthy
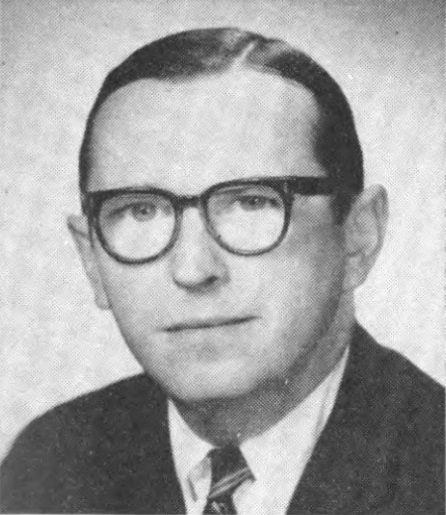

Member of the U.S. House of Representatives from New York's 39th district
- In office January 3, 1965 – January 3, 1971
- Preceded by: John R. Pillion
- Succeeded by: Jack Kemp

Personal details
- Born: September 24, 1927 Buffalo, New York
- Died: May 5, 1995 (aged 67) Arlington County, Virginia
- Party: Democratic Party
- Education: Canisius College

Richard Dean “Max” McCarthy (September 24, 1927 – May 5, 1995) was an American newspaperman and politician who served three terms as a Democratic member of the United States House of Representatives from New York from 1965 to 1971.

He was also known as Richard Max McCarthy or Max McCarthy.

== Early life ==
He served in the United States Navy from November 1945 until August 1946, and in the United States Army from November 1950 until October 1952.

He graduated from Canisius College in 1950. He worked for The Buffalo News from 1952 until 1956.

=== Congress ===
He was elected to Congress in 1964 and served from January 3, 1965 to January 3, 1971. In 1970, he ran in the Democratic primary for the nomination for U.S. Senator from New York against Ted Sorensen, Richard Ottinger and Paul O'Dwyer, but was defeated by Ottinger.

=== Later career ===
He worked as a press attaché to the American Embassy in Tehran from 1975 to 1976. He was the Washington bureau chief of The Buffalo News from 1978 until his retirement in 1989.

== Sources ==
- United States Congress. "Richard D. McCarthy (id: M000318)". Biographical Directory of the United States Congress.

U.S. House of Representatives
Preceded by John R. Pillion	Member of the U.S. House of Representatives from New York's 39th congressional district 1965 - 1971	Succeeded by Jack Kemp
