= Harold O. Whitnall =

American professor and politician (1877–1945)

Harold Orville Whitnall (August 3, 1877 – May 18, 1945) was an American geology professor and politician from Hamilton, New York.

== Life ==
Whitnall was born at August 3, 1877 in Morristown, New Jersey, the son of Thaddeus Orville Whitnall and Jessie Minard.

Whitnall graduated from Colgate University in Hamilton, New York with a Bachelor of Philosophy in 1900 and a Master of Arts in 1909. He studied at Harvard University for two years, and in their 1903 summer session he served as assistant in geology. He worked as a field assistant of the New York State Survey from 1905 to 1907. He began working for Colgate as an in instructor in geology in 1903. He was then appointed assistant professor in 1909, associate professor in 1912, and full professor in geology in 1921. He also maintained a consulting practice for a number of important clients and served as chief geologist for the New York, Ontario and Western Railway. He wrote a number of papers, articles, and books, including "Dawn of Mankind" and "Dinosaurs and their World" in 1924 and "A Parade of Ancient Animals" in 1936. He received an honorary D.S. degree from Bates College in 1939.

Whitnall was an alternate delegate to the 1920 Republican National Convention and a presidential elector to the 1924 presidential election. In 1926, he was elected to the New York State Assembly as a Republican, representing Madison County. He served in the Assembly in 1927. He became Madison County Republican Chairman in 1940 and held that position until his death. During World War I, he was a major in the Home Guard and a deputy food administrator. During World War II, he worked as a consultant for the State Department of Commerce from 1943 until his death. In March 1942, a few months after the attack on Pearl Harbor, he publicly announced a scheme to end the war with Japan by using aerial bombs to cause volcano eruptions, which would in turn also cause earthquakes and tidal waves. In December 1944, he claimed that B-29 bombs dropped in or near Japanese volcanos caused a tidal wave that occurred there during that time, although Father Joseph Lynch, Fordham University's chief seismologist, called the theory "utterly fantastic."

Whitnall was a Baptist, a fellow of the American Association for the Advancement of Science, and a member of the American Institute of Mining and Metallurgical Engineers, the American Association of Mammalogists, the Society of Meteoric Research, Phi Beta Kappa, and Delta Kappa Epsilon. In 1908, he married Elizabeth Sherwood of Camillus. Their children were Thaddeus Orville, Helen Sherwood, and Faith Esther.

Whitnall died at home from a heart attack on May 18, 1945. A private funeral service was held at his home and a public service was held in the Colgate University chapel. He was buried in Erieville Cemetery.

New York State Assembly
Preceded by John W. Gates	New York State Assembly; Madison County; 1927	Succeeded by Arthur A. Hartshorn
