= 1938 United States Senate special election in New York =

- November 8, 1938
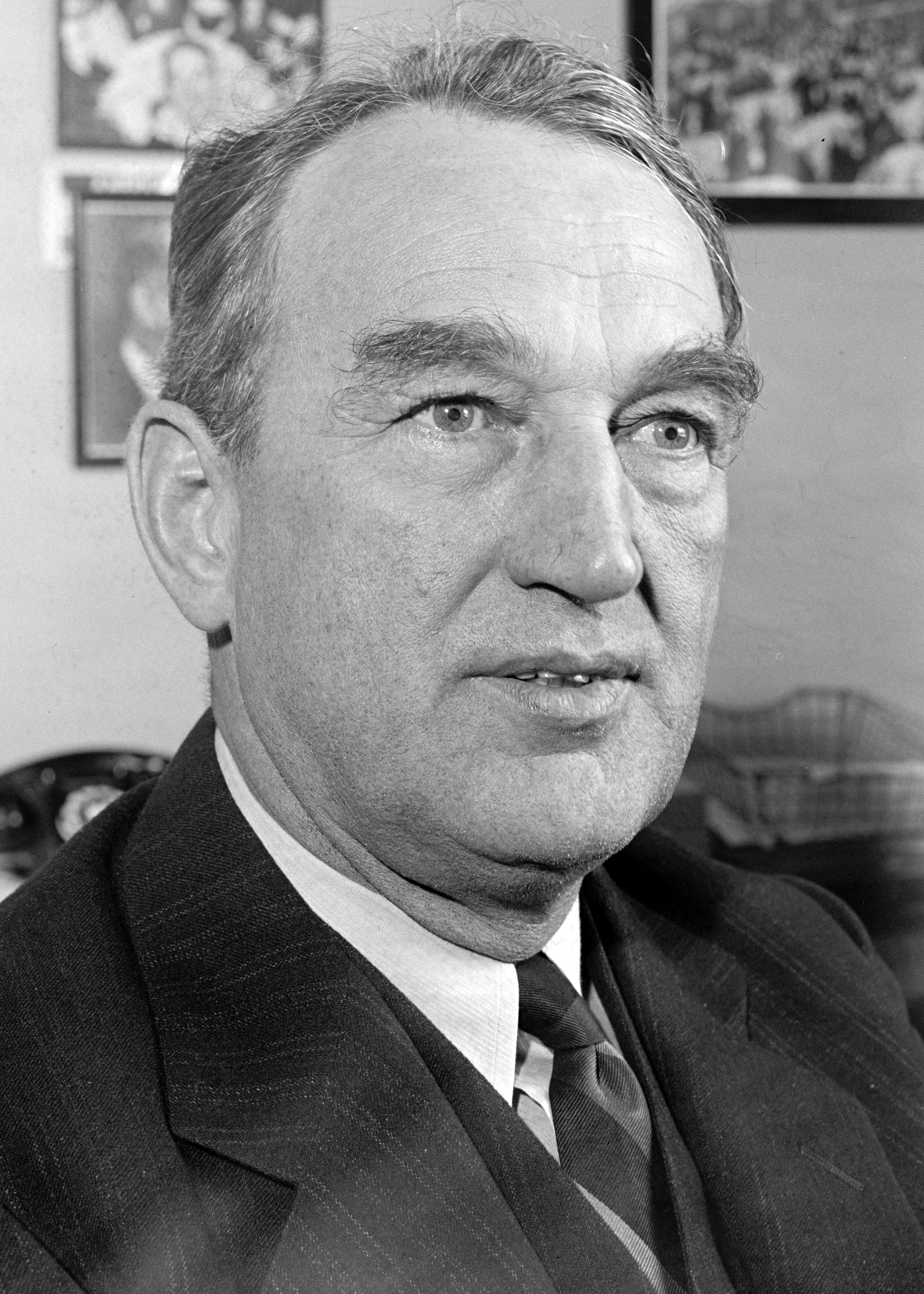

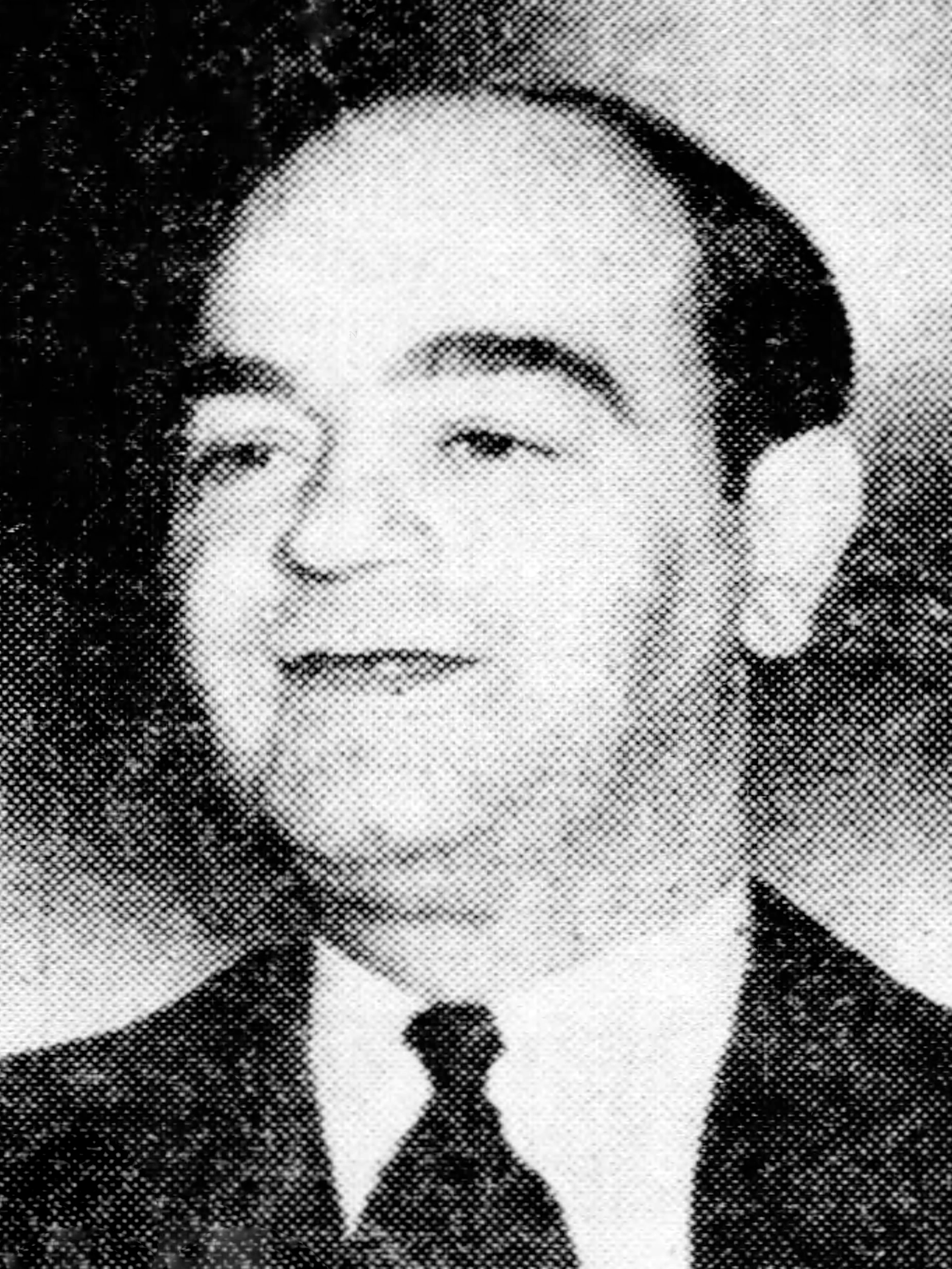
| Nominee | James M. Mead | Edward F. Corsi |
| Party | Democratic | Republican |
| Alliance | American Labor Party | Independent Progressive |
| Popular vote | 2,438,904 | 2,083,666 |
| Percentage | 53.93% | 46.08% |
- County results Mead: 50–60% 60–70% 70–80% Corsi: 50–60% 60–70% 70–80%
U.S. senator before election
Vacant (Note: Incumbent U.S. senator Royal S. Copeland died on June 17, 1938. However, governor Herbert H. Lehman chose not to appoint anyone to the vacant Senate seat.)
Elected U.S. Senator
James M. Mead
Democratic

The 1938 United States Senate special election in New York was held on November 8, 1938, to complete the unexpired term of Senator Royal S. Copeland, who died in office on June 17, 1938. U.S. Representative James M. Mead of Buffalo defeated Edward F. Corsi to win the seat.

== Nomination conventions ==
=== Democratic convention ===
Initially, incumbent governor Herbert H. Lehman sought the Democratic nomination for the U.S. senate election, saying "If my party desires me to be a candidate for the office of U.S. Senator to succeed Senator Copeland, I will accept the nomination". However, Lehman was drafted to again run for governor.

The Democratic convention met on October 1 and nominated U.S. Representative James M. Mead.

=== Republican convention ===
The Republican convention met on September 29 and nominated Edward F. Corsi for the special election.

== General election ==
=== Candidates ===
- Edward F. Corsi, former Commissioner of Immigration at Ellis Island (Republican and Independent Progressive)
- James M. Mead, U.S. Representative from Buffalo (Democratic and American Labor)

=== Campaign ===
Neither Mead nor Corsi were regarded by The New York Times as leading the New York ticket for their respective party. The two ticket leaders were Robert F. Wagner, incumbent Democratic U.S. Senator, and Thomas E. Dewey, Republican candidate for Governor.

=== Results ===
A total of 263,308 blank, void, and scattering votes were cast and are not accounted for in the box below.

United States Senate Special election in New York, 1938
| Party | Candidate | Votes | % | ±% |
|---|---|---|---|---|
| Democratic | James M. Mead | 2,060,875 | 45.57% | N/A |
| American Labor | James M. Mead | 378,028 | 8.36% | N/A |
| Total | James M. Mead | 2,438,904 | 53.93% | N/A |
| Republican | Edward F. Corsi | 2,066,631 | 45.60% | N/A |
| Independent Progressive | Edward F. Corsi | 17,035 | 0.38% | N/A |
| Total | Edward F. Corsi | 2,083,666 | 46.08% | N/A |
| Total votes | | 4,522,570 | 100.0% | N/A |
| Democratic hold | | | | |

== See also ==
- 1938 United States Senate elections
