= Pius Schwert =

American politician and baseball player (1892–1941)

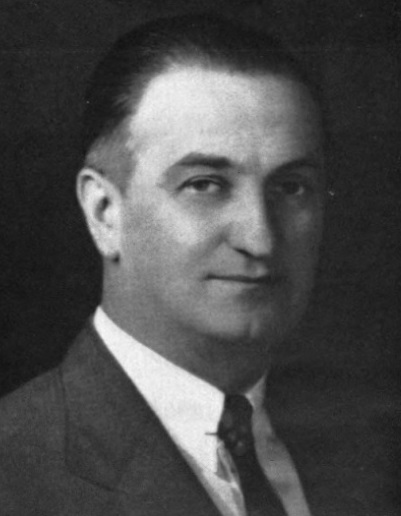
- Frontispiece of 1942's Pius Louis Schwert, Late a Representative

Member of the U.S. House of Representatives from New York's 42nd district
- In office January 3, 1939 – March 11, 1941
- Preceded by: James M. Mead
- Succeeded by: John Cornelius Butler

County Clerk of Erie County, New York
- In office 1934–1938
- Preceded by: John L. Staeber
- Succeeded by: Henry J. Dixon

Personal details
- Born: November 22, 1892 Angola, New York, US
- Died: March 11, 1941 (aged 48) Washington, D.C., US
- Resting place: Forest Avenue Cemetery in Angola
- Party: Democratic
- Spouse: Harriet
- Education: University of Pennsylvania

Military service
- Branch/service: United States Navy
- Years of service: 1918–1919
- Rank: Ensign
- Baseball career
- Catcher
- Batted: Right Threw: Right

MLB debut
- August 20, 1914, for the New York Yankees

Last MLB appearance
- October 7, 1915, for the New York Yankees

MLB statistics
- Batting average: .208
- Home runs: 0
- Runs batted in: 6
- Stats at Baseball Reference

Teams
- New York Yankees (1914–1915)

Pius Louis Schwert (November 22, 1892 – March 11, 1941) was an American politician and professional baseball player. He played for the New York Yankees of Major League Baseball and was a member of the United States House of Representatives from New York's 42nd congressional district from 1939 to 1941.

A member of the Democratic Party, Schwert was elected county clerk of Erie County in 1933 and reelected in 1936. He was elected to Congress in 1938 and reelected in 1940. Schwert died following a heart attack as he was giving a speech on March 11, 1941.

== Early life ==
Schwert was born in Angola, New York, on November 22, 1892. He was the only child of Louisa Ahlers and Julius Marcus Schwert, who was the town supervisor of Evans, New York. He attended Angola High School in Angola, until he transferred to Lafayette High School in Buffalo, New York, in 1909. He played as a catcher on the baseball teams of both high schools, and played semi-professional baseball on the weekends. Schwert graduated from Lafayette in 1910.

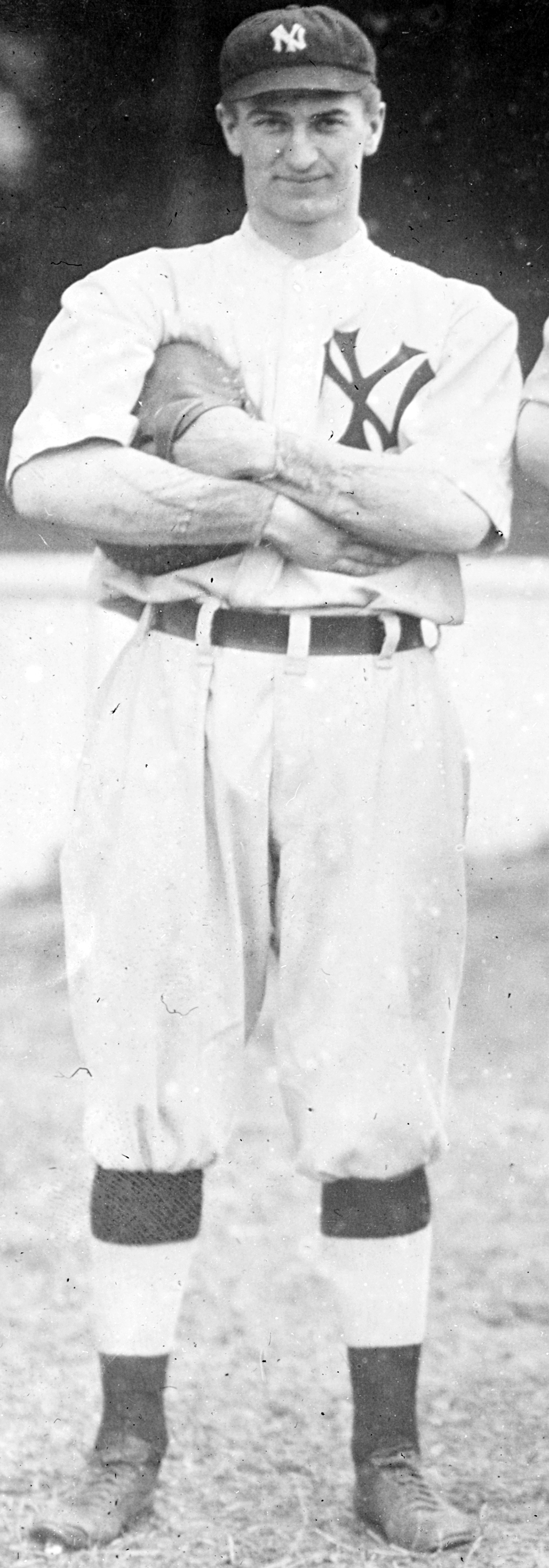
Schwert with the Yankees

Schwert enrolled at the Wharton School of Commerce at the University of Pennsylvania. While enrolled at Penn, he was a member of Sigma Phi Epsilon and played college baseball for the Penn Quakers as a catcher. In his senior year, his teammates voted for him to be the team captain. He had a .183 batting average in 26 games for the Quakers in 1914. Despite his poor batting average, his defensive abilities resulted in his being named to the "All-Consensus" team, a forerunner for the College Baseball All-America Team. Schwert graduated from Penn in 1914 with a Bachelor of Science in economics.

== Professional baseball career ==
After his graduation, Frank Chance, the manager of the New York Yankees of Major League Baseball, signed Schwert to a contract. He made his major league debut on August 20. He played in three games for the Yankees in 1914, and did not have a hit in eight plate appearances. During the 1914–15 offseason, Schwert claimed that there was an error in his contract that made him a free agent. He was pursued by the Cincinnati Reds, but Bill Donovan, the Yankees' new manager, convinced him to sign a new contract with the Yankees. In 1915, Schwert was the third-string catcher behind Jeff Sweeney and Les Nunamaker. Schwert played in four games for the Yankees before they demoted him to the Jersey City Skeeters of the Class AA International League. He batted .214 in 31 games for Jersey City, was promoted to the Yankees towards the end of the season, and played in five more games for the Yankees. The game of October 7, 1915, was his last major league game. He played in 12 major league games, with a .208 batting average in 24 at-bats.

After the 1915 season, the University of the South named Schwert their new athletic director. He opened a general store in Angola in 1916. With the Yankees, Schwert competed with Nunamaker, Roxy Walters, and Walt Alexander for a roster spot for the 1916 season, but he was demoted to the Newark Indians of the International League, where he batted .232 in 84 games. Before the 1917 season, he informed teams that he was retired from baseball. The Mobile Sea Gulls of the Class A Southern Association purchased him from Newark, and Schwert refused to report to Mobile. Mobile suspended him but still reserved him for the 1918 season.

In March 1918, Schwert enlisted in the United States Navy. He served first as a yeoman at the Bremerton Navy Yard, and later he was commissioned as an ensign at the Philadelphia Naval Shipyard. In Philadelphia, he played for the 4th Naval District baseball team, which was managed by Harry Davis, and included Morrie Rath, Jing Johnson, and Bob Shawkey. He was discharged from the Navy at the end of the war.

Schwert returned to Angola in 1920, and played semi-professional baseball locally. When all three catchers for the Buffalo Bisons of the International League were injured during the 1920 season, Schwert signed with Buffalo, and batted .496 in 14 games. He returned to the Bisons in 1921, under the agreement that he would only play for Buffalo in home games. He batted .262 in 29 games. He was released in April 1922 when he did not report to the team. He worked at the Bank of Angola, starting as a clerk and cashier, and working his way up to serve as its president. He remained involved in semi-professional sports, becoming the president of the Western New York League in 1929.

== Political career ==
Schwert became involved in civic organizations in Angola. He was elected vice commander of the American Legion, president of the Angola volunteer fire department and the Southwestern Volunteer Firemen's Association, and the master of the masonic lodge in Evans. In 1933, Schwert ran for county clerk of Erie County as a Democrat. He won the election to a three-year term, won reelection in 1936, and served from 1934 to 1938.

=== Congress ===
In 1938, Democrats needed to nominate a replacement candidate for James M. Mead in New York's 42nd congressional district in the United States House of Representatives, after Mead was nominated to run for the United States Senate. Democratic Party members selected Schwert. He won the election, defeating Republican John Cornelius Butler. Schwert was reelected in 1940, beating Edward F. Moss.

As a member of Congress, Schwert opposed the development of the Saint Lawrence Seaway and supported the development of harbors for boats in the Southtowns and welfare programs and vocational training for youth. He supported providing aid to France and Great Britain during World War II. Schwert also wrote to Governor Herbert H. Lehman to advocate for the completion of McKinley Parkway.

== Death ==
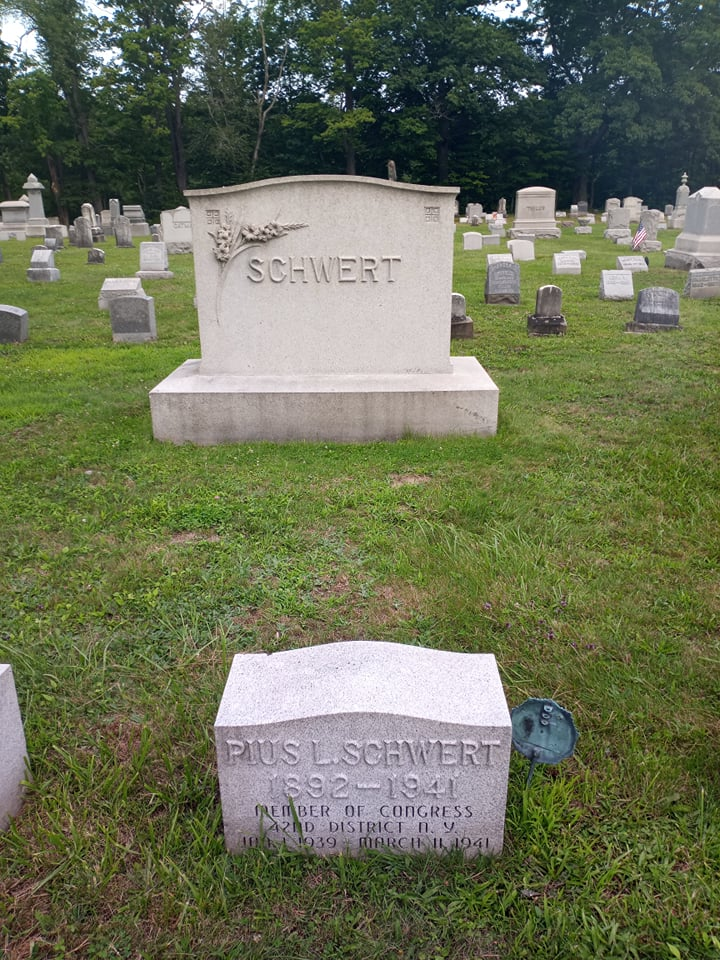
Schwert's grave in Angola

Schwert died in Washington, D.C., on March 11, 1941. He attended a dinner party at the Annapolis Hotel and collapsed shortly after making a speech. In the speech, he was announcing his candidacy for mayor of Buffalo. He was rushed to the hospital, where he was pronounced dead of a heart attack. He was buried at Forest Avenue Cemetery in Angola. Schwert had survived a previous heart attack in 1940 that occurred when he was exercising in the United States Capitol gymnasium.

== Personal life and death ==
Schwert married Harriet "Hattie" Elizabeth Schwert, his first cousin, on February 12, 1923. She was a teacher in Buffalo and Eden, New York. They did not have children.

Harriet Schwert ran against Butler in the special election to fill the remainder of Schwert's term in Congress. As she was still in mourning, Harriet did not campaign, with Mead making speeches on her behalf. Butler defeated Schwert in the election.

=== Electoral history ===
New York's 42nd congressional district election, 1938
Party	Candidate	Votes	%
Democratic	Pius L. Schwert	39,287	45.77
Republican	John Cornelius Butler	36,326	42.32
Open Book	John A. Ulinski	9,537	11.11
Ecpole	John E. Kralisz	414	0.48
Socialist	Connie Wilson	274	0.32
Total votes		85,838	100.00
Democratic hold			

New York's 42nd congressional district election, 1940
Party	Candidate	Votes	%
Democratic	Pius L. Schwert (incumbent)	64,250	58.76
Republican	Edward F. Moss	44,866	41.03
Communist	Mattie L. Green	227	0.21
Total votes		109,343	100.00
Democratic hold			

== See also ==
- List of American sportsperson-politicians
- List of members of the United States Congress who died in office (1900–1949)

U.S. House of Representatives
Preceded by James M. Mead	Member of the U.S. House of Representatives from New York's 42nd congressional district 1939–1941	Succeeded by John Cornelius Butler
