= John W. Gates (New York politician) =

American politician (1872–1966)

John W. Gates (August 18, 1872 – April 8, 1966) was an American farmer, banker and politician from New York.

== Life ==
He was the son of State Senator Francis H. Gates (1839–1925) and Fannie E. (Everson) Gates (1843–1930), and was born on the Gates homestead, about two miles southwest of the Village of Chittenango, in Madison County, New York. On January 1, 1896, he married Helen Maria "Nellie" Colyer (1873–1956), and they had three children. He was President of the Salt Springs National Bank, of Syracuse; and sat on the boards of several other manufacturing and financial enterprises.

Gates was a member of the New York State Assembly (Madison Co.) in 1925 and 1926; and a member of the New York State Senate (39th D.) from 1927 to 1932, sitting in the 150th, 151st, 152nd, 153rd, 154th and 155th New York State Legislatures. He was a delegate to the 1932 Republican National Convention. In September 1932, Gates was not re-nominated by the Republicans for his Senate seat. In November 1932, he ran on the Law Preservation ticket for re-election, but was defeated by the Republican nominee Walter W. Stokes.

He died on April 8, 1966; and was buried at the Gates Cemetery in Chittenango.

== Sources ==
New York State Assembly
Preceded by J. Arthur Brooks	New York State Assembly; Madison County; 1925–1926	Succeeded by Harold O. Whitnall
New York State Senate
Preceded by Willis Wendell	New York State Senate; 39th District; 1927–1932	Succeeded by Walter W. Stokes
