= William F. Waldow =

American politician

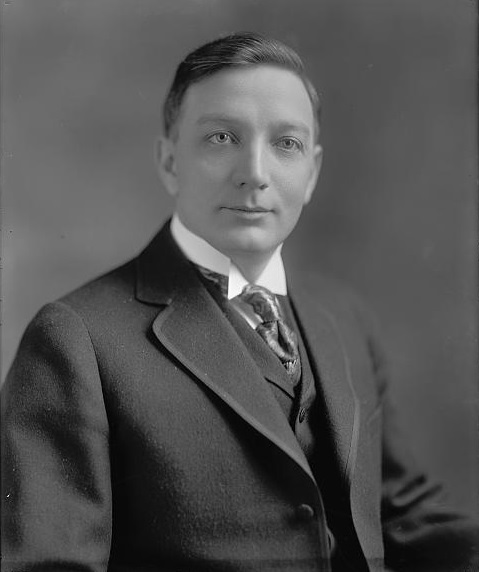

Member of the U.S. House of Representatives from New York's 42nd district
- In office March 4, 1917 – March 3, 1919
- Preceded by: Daniel A. Driscoll
- Succeeded by: James M. Mead

Sheriff of Erie County, New York
- In office January 1, 1921 – December 31, 1923
- Preceded by: Fred A. Bradley
- Succeeded by: Frank A. Tyler

Member of the Buffalo, New York Board of Aldermen
- In office January 1, 1912 – December 31, 1913
- Preceded by: Samuel Stengel
- Succeeded by: George Kohl
- Constituency: 15th Ward

Personal details
- Born: August 26, 1882 Buffalo, New York, US
- Died: April 16, 1930 (aged 47) Snyder, New York, US
- Resting place: Forest Lawn Cemetery, Buffalo, New York, US
- Party: Republican
- Spouse: Maud Emma Lacey (m. 1903–1930)
- Occupation: Plumbing contractor

William Frederick Waldow (August 26, 1882 – April 16, 1930) was an American businessman and politician from Buffalo, New York. He served as a United States representative from New York's 42nd congressional district for one term, 1917 to 1919.

== Biography ==
William F. Waldow was born in Buffalo, New York on August 26, 1882, a son of Gustav R. and Caroline W. Waldow. (Note: Who's Who incorrectly gives Waldow's year of birth as 1872 and year of marriage as 1893. Both are off by 10 years, as indicated by the U.S. Census for 1900 and 1910.) He attended the common schools, worked as an apprentice plumber, and was later employed as a plumbing contractor. He served on the Buffalo board of aldermen from 1912 to 1913. He was a member of the New York Republican State Committee from 1916 to 1918.

Waldow was elected as a Republican to the 65th Congress, holding office from March 4, 1917, to March 3, 1919. During his term, he was a member of the Committee on Insular Affairs.

In 1918, Waldow was an unsuccessful candidate for reelection to the 66th Congress, after which he returned to Buffalo and resumed former business pursuits. In addition, he was appointed to the board of directors of the East Side Share Corporation and the East Side National Bank. He was also a member of the Odd Fellows, the Humboldt Club, and the Buffalo Trap and Field Club.

In 1920, Waldow was a delegate to the Republican National Convention. Later that year, Waldow was the successful Republican nominee for sheriff of Erie County, and he served from 1921 to 1923.

Waldow died in Snyder on April 16, 1930. (Note: The Buffalo News obituary incorrectly states that Waldow served on the Erie County Board of Supervisors. Another individual, Joseph F. Waldow, ran for the board of supervisors in 1907.) He was buried at Forest Lawn Cemetery in Buffalo.

== Notes ==
U.S. House of Representatives
Preceded by Daniel A. Driscoll	Member of the U.S. House of Representatives from New York's 42nd congressional district 1917–1919	Succeeded by James M. Mead
