= 1940 United States Senate election in New York =

- November 5, 1940
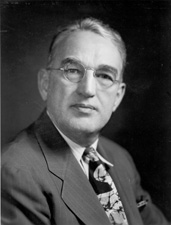

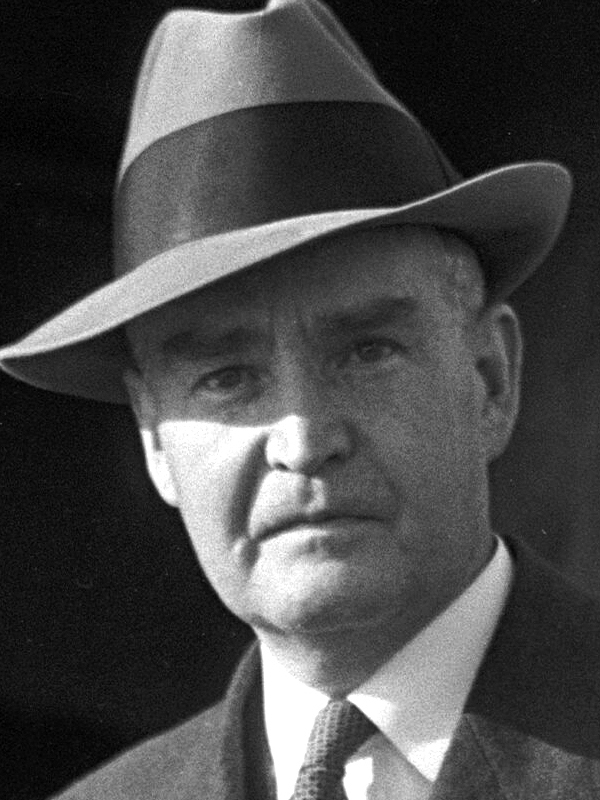
Nominee	James M. Mead	Bruce Barton
Party	Democratic	Republican
Alliance	American Labor
Popular vote	3,274,766	2,868,852
Percentage	53.26%	46.66%
- County results Mead: 50–60% 60–70% Barton: 50–60% 60–70% 70–80%
U.S. senator before election
James M. Mead
Democratic
Elected U.S. Senator
James M. Mead
Democratic

The 1940 United States Senate election in New York was held on November 5, 1940. Incumbent Democratic Senator James M. Mead, first elected in 1938 to fill vacancy caused by the death of Royal S. Copeland, was re-elected to a full term in office, defeating Republican Bruce Barton.

== Republican nomination ==
=== Candidates ===
- Bruce Barton, U.S. Representative from Manhattan

=== Convention ===
At the Republican convention in White Plains on September 27, Bruce Barton was nominated without opposition. His nomination came at the urging of presidential candidate Wendell Willkie. He focused his acceptance speech on the need to deny President Roosevelt an unprecedented third term in office, which he insinuated would lead to dictatorship through an end to free elections, end of labor unionism, the end of Congress and Congress's power to declare war, the end of protection for racial and religious minorities, and the establishment of a permanent conscripted peacetime army "á la Hitler and Mussolini."

== Democratic nomination ==
=== Candidates ===
- James M. Mead, incumbent Senator since 1938

=== Convention ===
Without a declared opponent, Senator Mead was assured re-nomination. At the state convention at the Manhattan Center on September 30, Mead gave a speech praising President Roosevelt, James A. Farley, Edward J. Flynn, Senator Robert F. Wagner, and Governor Herbert Lehman. He fully embraced Roosevelt's bid for a third term, arguing that the Founding Fathers had not intended any limit on the term of president, and argued for religious tolerance and national unity. His nomination was confirmed unanimously in a night session of the convention.

== General election ==
=== Candidates ===
- Bruce Barton, U.S. Representative from Manhattan (Republican)
- James M. Mead, incumbent Senator since 1938 (Democratic)
- Stephen W. Paine (Prohibition)

=== Results ===
1940 U.S. Senate election in New York
Party	Candidate	Votes	%
Democratic	James M. Mead	2,893,407	47.06%
American Labor	James M. Mead	381,359	6.20%
Total	James M. Mead (Incumbent)	3,274,766	53.26%
Republican	Bruce Barton	2,842,942	46.66%
Prohibition	Stephen W. Paine	4,944	0.08%
Total votes		6,148,562	100.00%
