= John R. Clancy =

American politician

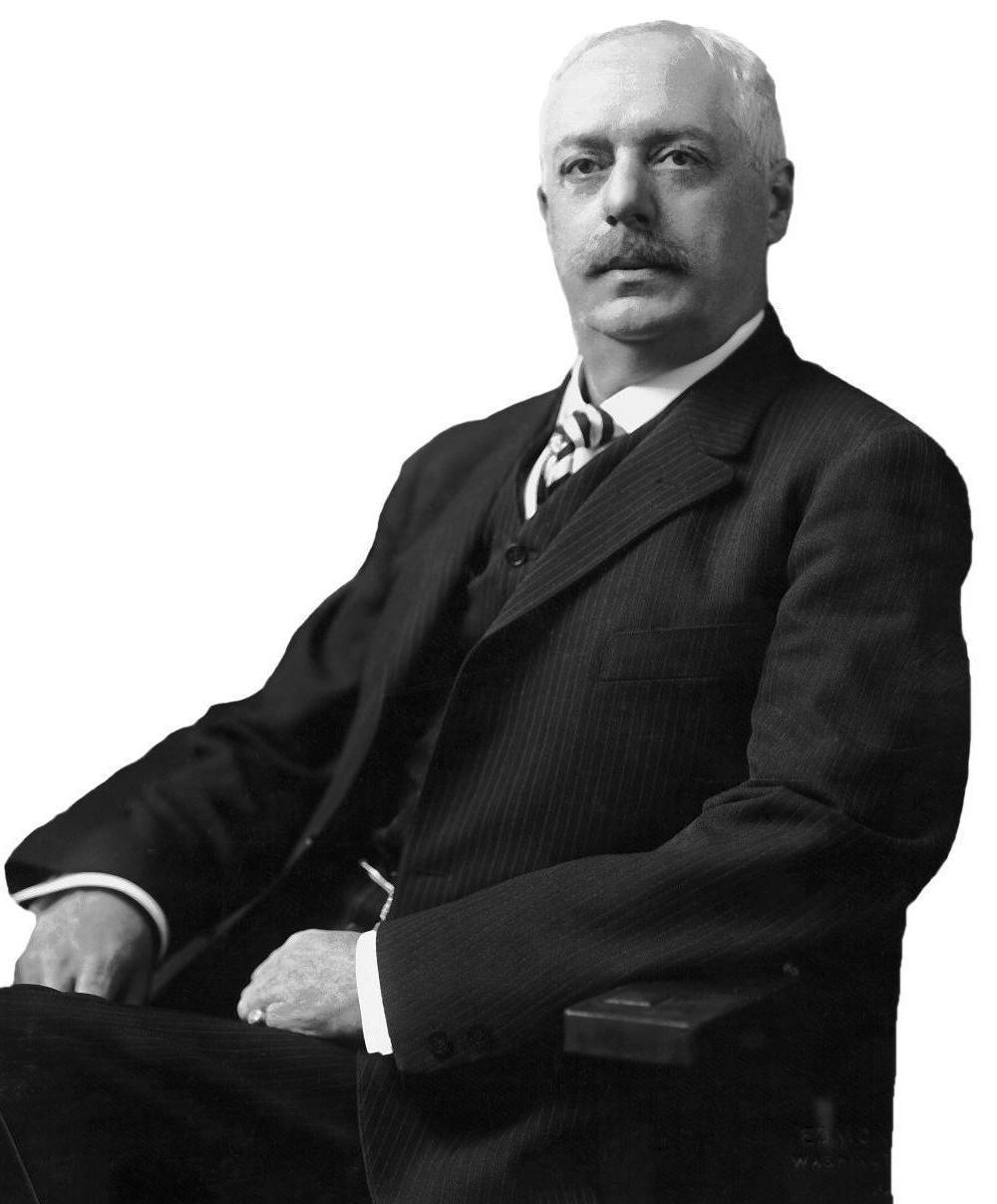

Member of the House of Representatives from New York's 35th District
- In office March 4, 1913 – March 3, 1915
- Preceded by: Daniel A. Driscoll
- Succeeded by: Walter W. Magee

Personal details
- Born: John Richard Clancy; March 8, 1859 Syracuse, New York, US
- Died: April 21, 1932 (aged 73) Syracuse, New York, US
- Resting place: St. Agnes Cemetery, Syracuse, New York, US
- Party: Democratic
- Occupation: Businessman

John Richard Clancy (March 8, 1859 – April 21, 1932) was an American inventor, businessman, and politician. He is most notable for his efforts to develop and market standardized theatrical stage equipment, including rigging and fire curtains. He is also notable for his service in the United States House of Representatives for one term from 1913 to 1915.

== Early life ==
Clancy was born in Syracuse, New York on March 8, 1859, the only child of Richard V. and Elizabeth A. (Magee) Clancy. His father was a partner in the successful Clancy Brothers bakery business, and also served as an alderman for three terms. John Clancy attended the public schools, after which he found work as typesetter for the Syracuse Herald, and then as a stagehand. By the time he was in his early 20s, Clancy was assistant treasurer for the Grand Opera House in Syracuse.

In 1878 mayor James J. Belden formed a committee of citizens to look after the interests of St. Joseph's Hospital. Clancy served as the financial secretary.

== Business career ==
Having recognized the need for standardized stage equipment as a way to improve productions and safety, Clancy went into the business of manufacturing rigging in 1885. Drawing on his previous theater experience, Clancy invented and made improvements to many items which later became common in theaters, including lightweight sets, lighting, and automatic fire curtains. Clancy later expanded into manufacturing other specialty metal hardware, including brace irons and screw eyes, and was an executive and director of several banks.

=== Affiliations ===
Clancy also served as vice president of the New York State College of Forestry at Syracuse University's board of trustees, and was member of the Central New York State Park Commission.

== Congressman ==
In 1912, Clancy was elected to the Sixty-third Congress as a Democrat. He served one term, (March 4, 1913 – March 3, 1915), and was an unsuccessful candidate for reelection in 1914 to the Sixty-fourth Congress.

== Later career ==
After leaving Congress, John Clancy resumed his business activities. During World War I he served on the Governor's public safety committee, and on the state armory commission. In addition, John Clancy managed metal stamping and forging for producing military equipment in five central New York counties under the aegis of the federal War Production Board.

== Death and burial ==
John Clancy died in Syracuse, New York, April 21, 1932. He was interred at St. Agnes Cemetery in Syracuse.

== Legacy ==
Clancy's primary business venture, JR Clancy Company, is still active and continues to supply stage equipment and services to the entertainment industry.

== Family ==
On April 29, 1886, Clancy married Elenora V. Kopp of Cincinnati. They had no children.

== Sources ==
=== Books ===
- Bruce, Dwight H. (1896). Onondaga's Centennial: Gleanings of a Century. Vol. II. Boston, MA: Boston History Company.

U.S. House of Representatives
Preceded by Daniel A. Driscoll	Member of the U.S. House of Representatives from New York's 35th congressional district 1913–1915	Succeeded by Walter W. Magee
