= William H. Ryan =

American politician

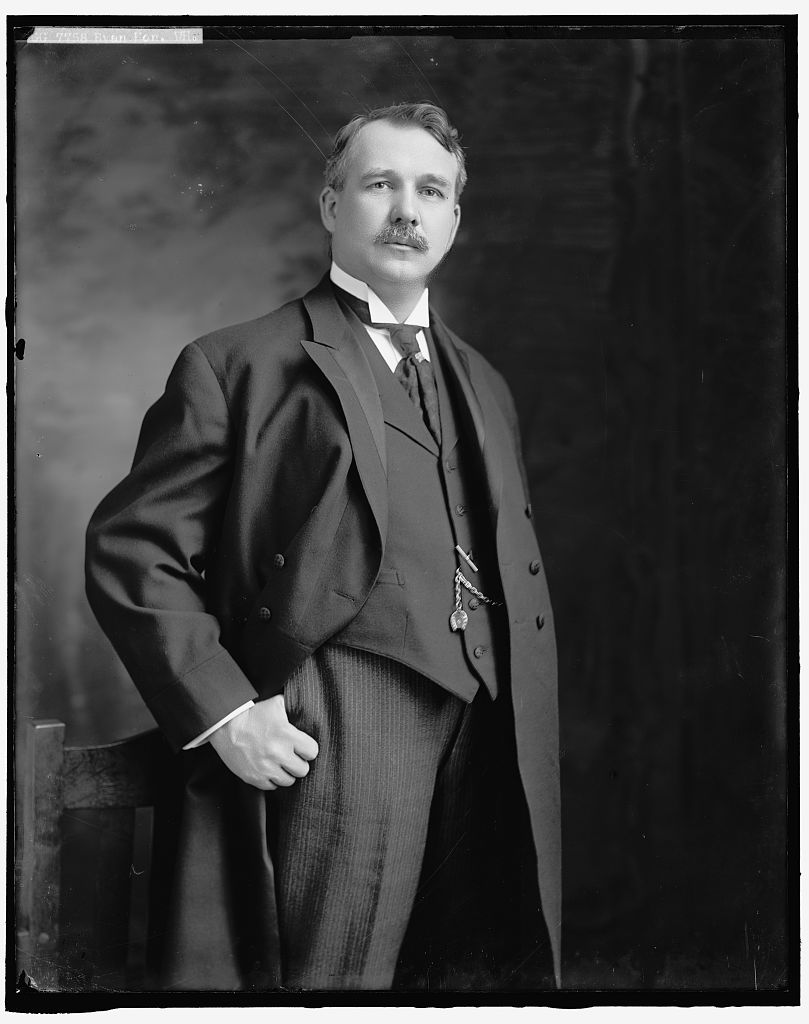

Member of the U.S. House of Representatives from New York
- In office March 4, 1899 – March 3, 1909
- Preceded by: Rowland B. Mahany (32nd); District established (35th)
- Succeeded by: James B. Perkins (32nd); Daniel A. Driscoll (35th)
- Constituency: 32nd district (1899-1903); 35th district (1903-09)

Personal details
- Born: May 10, 1860 Hopkinton, Massachusetts, U.S.
- Died: November 18, 1939 (aged 79) Buffalo, New York, U.S.

William Henry Ryan (May 10, 1860 – November 18, 1939) was an American businessman and politician who served as a U.S. representative from New York from 1899 to 1909.

== Biography ==
Born in Hopkinton, Massachusetts, Ryan moved to Buffalo, New York, with his parents in 1866, where he attended the local schools. He engaged in the retail shoe business and later in the general insurance and bonding business.

=== Political career ===
In 1894, Ryan was elected to the board of supervisors of Erie County at the age of 34. He was reelected in 1897, and served as chairman in 1898.

==== Congress ====
That same year, Ryan was elected as a Democrat to the 56th United States Congress, where he served from March 4, 1899 to March 3, 1909. He ran unsuccessfully for renomination to his incumbent seat in 1908.

He served as delegate to the Democratic National Conventions in 1904, and 1924.

=== Later career and death ===
He resumed the insurance and bonding business in Buffalo, New York, and engaged for a time in banking. He served as a member of the grade crossing and terminal commission (1919–1939); and as member of the Allegany State Park Commission (1930–1939).

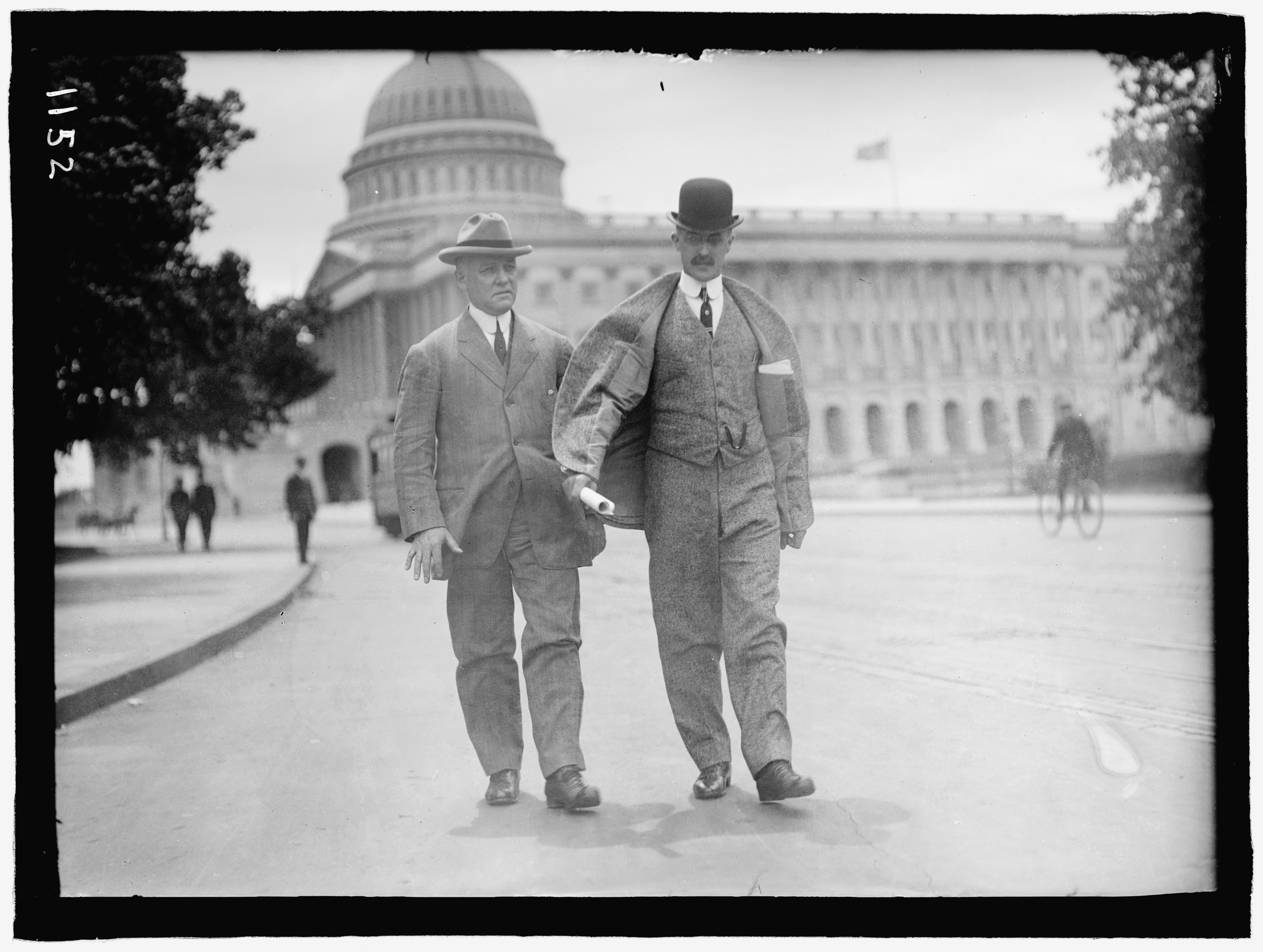
Ryan (left)

He died in Buffalo, New York on November 18, 1939. He was interred in Mount Calvary Cemetery, at Pine Hill, near Buffalo, New York.

== Sources ==
- United States Congress. "William H. Ryan (id: R000563)". Biographical Directory of the United States Congress.

U.S. House of Representatives
| Preceded by Rowland B. Mahany | Member of the U.S. House of Representatives from New York's 32nd congressional district 1899–1903 | Succeeded by James B. Perkins |
| New district | Member of the U.S. House of Representatives from New York's 35th congressional district 1903–1909 | Succeeded by Daniel A. Driscoll |
