= Daniel A. Driscoll =

American politician (1875–1955)

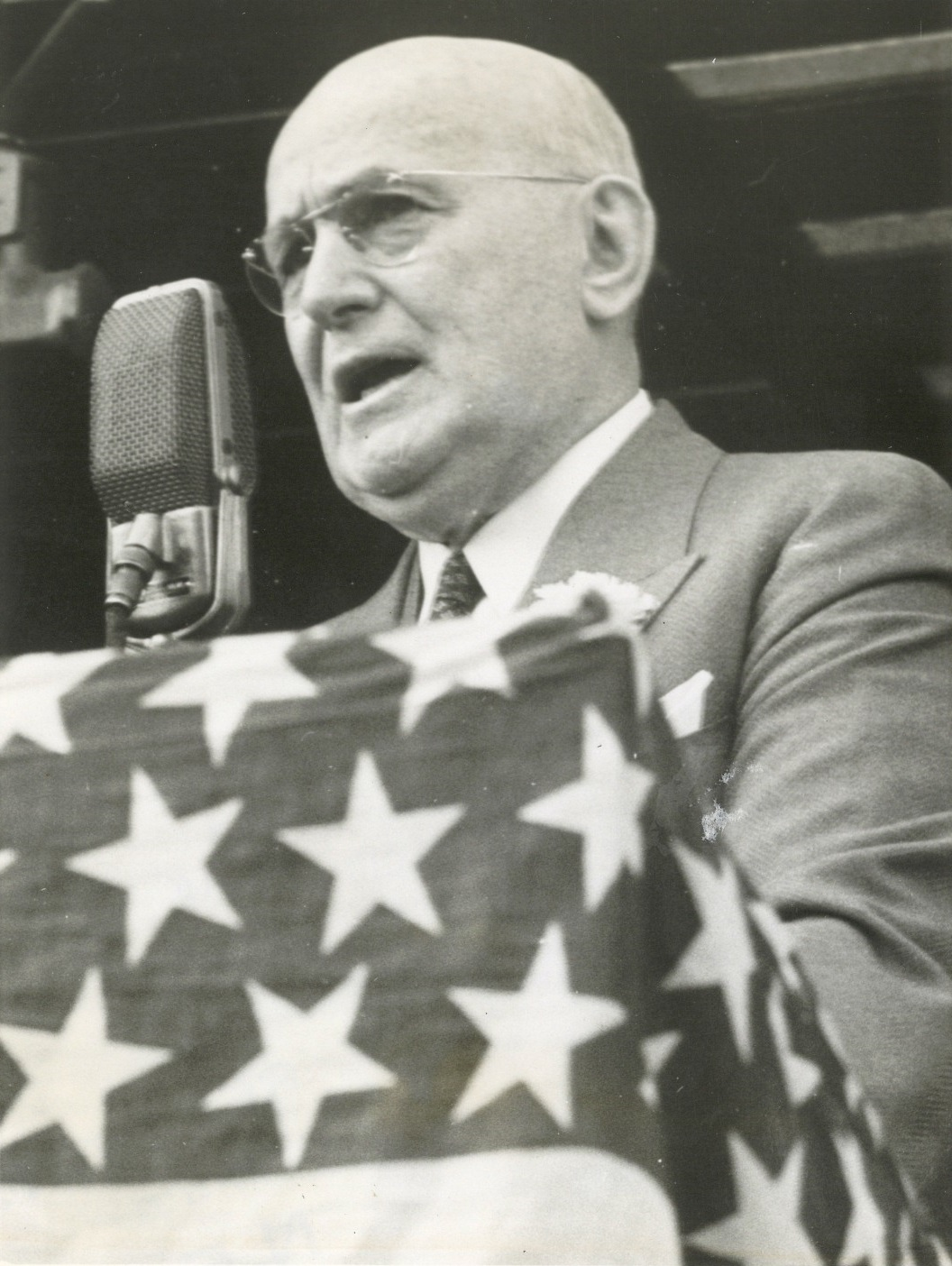
- Driscoll at the 1939 dedication of the new post office in Harrison, New York

Member of the U.S. House of Representatives from New York
- In office March 4, 1909 – March 3, 1917
- Preceded by: William H. Ryan
- Succeeded by: William F. Waldow
- Constituency: 35th district (1909–13); 42nd district (1913–17)

Postmaster of Buffalo, New York
- In office February 15, 1934 – February 27, 1947
- Preceded by: Robert W. Gallagher
- Succeeded by: John M. Keyes

Personal details
- Born: March 6, 1875 Buffalo, New York, US
- Died: June 5, 1955 (aged 80) Buffalo, New York, US
- Resting place: Holy Cross Cemetery, Lackawanna, New York, US
- Party: Democratic
- Occupation: Funeral home director

Daniel Angelus Driscoll (March 6, 1875 – June 5, 1955) was an American businessman and politician from Buffalo, New York. A partner in a successful family-owned funeral home, Driscoll later became involved in other business ventures including a brewery. A Democrat, Driscoll served four terms as a U.S. Representative from 1909 to 1917. In 1934, he was appointed as postmaster of Buffalo, and he served until 1947.

== Early life ==
Daniel A. Driscoll was born in Buffalo, New York on March 6, 1875, a son of Timothy Driscoll and Catherine Blanche Driscoll. He completed his elementary education at School 35 in 1891 and later graduated from Central High School. Driscoll was active in the funeral home begun by his father, Timothy Driscoll & Sons, which was later operated by Driscoll and his brothers as Timothy Driscoll's Sons.

Driscoll was also active in several civic and fraternal organizations, including leadership roles with the Ancient Order of Hibernians. In addition, he took part in many Catholic church activities, including taking on leadership positions on various charity committees.

== Early career ==
Driscoll was active in politics as a Democrat from an early age; in June 1898, he was elected secretary of local party meeting that chose delegates to that year's state party convention. In September 1899, he was a candidate for the New York State Assembly nomination at the Erie County 4th district Democratic convention. In November 1900, he was one of the organizers of the Jefferson Club of Erie County, which was formed by Democrats who desired to promote the party's ideals while avoiding the internal strife taking place among the party's various factions.

In 1903, Driscoll's supporters formed an organization to promote his political prospects, the Daniel A. Driscoll Association. In 1904, his supporters again campaigned unsuccessfully to obtain him the state assembly nomination at that year's Democratic district convention, an effort that ceased when Driscoll publicly disclaimed any interest.

== Congress ==
In 1906, Driscoll was a candidate for the Democratic nomination to represent New York's 35th congressional district; he withdrew in favor of incumbent William H. Ryan, who went on to win the general election.

In August 1908, Driscoll was again a candidate for the U.S. House; when it became clear that Driscoll had enough convention votes to obtain the nomination, Ryan withdrew. Driscoll won the November general election, defeating Republican L. Bradley Dorr and three minor party candidates. He succeeded Ryan on March 4, 1909.

Driscoll was reelected in 1910, 1912, and 1914. In 1916, he was an unsuccessful candidate for reelection. As a member of the U.S. House, Driscoll served on the Rivers and Harbors Committee. He used this post to secure funding for numerous improvements to New York's ports and waterways, including expansion and maintenance of the Port of Buffalo, as well as deepening shipping channels in the Hudson River and Lake Champlain.

== Later life ==
After leaving Congress, Driscoll resumed his rile with the Driscoll family funeral business. In addition, he became active in other ventures, including organizing and serving as president of Buffalo's Phoenix Brewery. In 1934, he was appointed postmaster of Buffalo, and he continued to serve until retiring in 1947. Driscoll was a member of the National Association of Postmasters, Elks, Moose, Buffalo Club, Buffalo Athletic Club, Park Club, Erie Downs Country Club, and Knights of Columbus.

In retirement, Driscoll continued to reside in Buffalo. Driscoll was a lifelong bachelor; he never married and had no children. He died in Buffalo on 5 June 1955. Driscoll was buried at Holy Cross Cemetery in Lackawanna.

== Election history ==
U.S. House of Representatives, New York's 35th congressional district, 1908

- Daniel A. Driscoll, Democratic: 25,866
- L. Bradley Dorr, Republican: 20,093
- Samuel F. Leary, Socialist: 626
- Charles Reinagel, Independence League: 133
- Joseph A. Dixon, Prohibition: 108

U.S. House of Representatives, New York's 35th congressional district, 1910

- Daniel A. Driscoll, Democratic/Independence League: 21,727
- Patrick J. Keeler, Republican: 14,605
- Samuel F. Leary, Socialist: 1,713
- Josph A. Dixon, Prohibition: 128

U.S. House of Representatives, New York's 42nd congressional district, 1912

- Daniel A. Driscoll, Democratic: 14,851
- Willard H. Ticknor, Republican: 8.613
- L. Bradley Dorr, National Progressive: 7,161
- Samuel Leary, Socialist: 1,613
- Vernon M. Stone, Prohibition: 259

U.S. House of Representatives, New York's 42nd congressional district, 1914

- Daniel A. Driscoll, Democratic: 13,081
- Willard H. Ticknor, Republican: 12,633
- John J. Smith, Progressive:1,265
- Adam Sebenck, Socialist: 688

U.S. House of Representatives, New York's 42nd congressional district, 1916

- William F. Waldow, Republican/National Progressive: 16,623
- Daniel A. Driscoll, Democratic: 15,411
- Samuel Fawkes, Socialist: 580
- Blank, scattering, void: 4,484

U.S. House of Representatives
Preceded by William H. Ryan	Member of the U.S. House of Representatives from New York's 35th congressional district 1909–1913	Succeeded by John R. Clancy
New district	Member of the U.S. House of Representatives from New York's 42nd congressional district 1913–1917	Succeeded by William F. Waldow
