= Walter W. Magee =

American politician

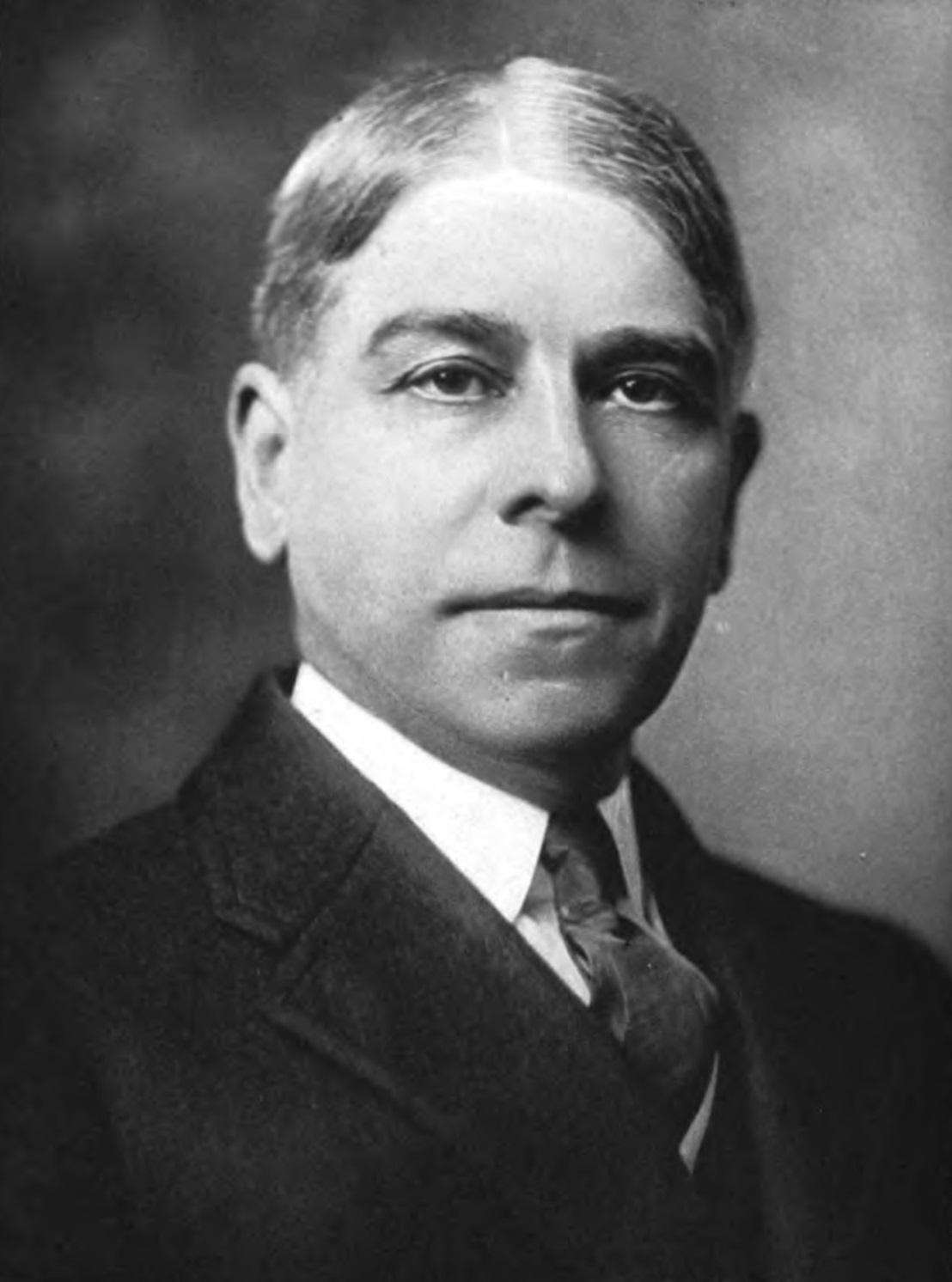
- Frontispiece of 1929's Walter W. Magee, Late a Representative

Member of the U.S. House of Representatives from New York
- In office March 4, 1915 – May 25, 1927
- Preceded by: John R. Clancy
- Succeeded by: Clarence E. Hancock
- Constituency: 35th district

Personal details
- Born: May 23, 1861 Groveland, New York
- Died: May 25, 1927 (aged 66) Syracuse, New York
- Resting place: Oakwood Cemetery, Syracuse, New York
- Party: Republican
- Education: Harvard University
- Profession: Attorney
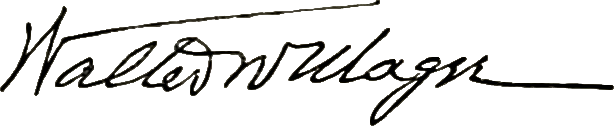
- Signature

Walter Warren Magee (May 23, 1861 – May 25, 1927) was an American lawyer and politician from New York. He was most notable for his service as a member of the United States House of Representatives; elected as a Republican in 1914, he served from 1915 until his death.

== Biography ==
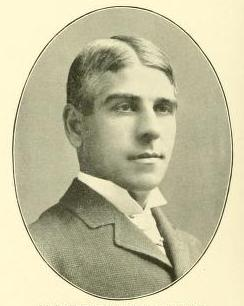
From 1903's Notable Men of Central New York

Magee was born in Groveland, New York on May 23, 1861, a son of farmers Marietta (Patchin) Magee and John Magee, who served as a colonel in the state militia. He attended the local schools and the Wadsworth Normal and Training School (now the State University of New York at Geneseo). Magee graduated from Harvard University in 1889, and delivered the class oration at his graduation ceremony. He then studied law at the Syracuse firm of Baldwin & Kennedy, and was admitted to the bar in 1891. He practiced law in Syracuse until 1904, and gained a reputation as a skilled trial attorney. Magee was also a talented athlete, and competed in tennis tournaments and other events.

A Republican, Magee served on the Onondaga County Board of Supervisors from 1892 to 1893. From 1904 to 1914, Magee served as Syracuse's corporation counsel.

In 1914, Magee won election to the House of Representatives. He was reelected six times, and served until his death. During his House career, Magee was appointed to the Appropriations Committee, and he rose through seniority to become chairman of its subcommittee on Agriculture.

== Death and burial ==
Magee died in Syracuse on May 25, 1927. He was buried at Oakwood Cemetery in Syracuse.

== Family ==
In 1895, Magee married Sarah Genevieve Wood (1873-1937), who was usually called Genevieve. They had no children. Genevieve Wood was the daughter of US Army Brigadier General Palmer G. Wood (1843-1915).

== See also ==
- List of members of the United States Congress who died in office (1900–1949)

== Sources ==
=== Books ===
- Bruce, Dwight H. (1896). Onondaga's Centennial: Gleanings of a Century. Vol. II. Boston, MA: The Boston History Company – via Internet Archive.
- US House of Representatives (1929). Memorial Addresses Delivered in the House of Representatives of the United States in Memory of Walter W. Magee, Late a Representative from New York. 70th Cong., 1st sess. House. Doc. 233. Washington, DC: US Government Printing Office – via HathiTrust.

=== Newspapers ===
- "In Fair Harvard's 'Yard'". New-York Daily Tribune. Cambridge, Massachusetts (published June 22, 1889). June 21, 1889. p. 6 – via Newspapers.com.
- "Double Wedding in Army Circles". Buffalo Evening News. Omaha, Nebraska. November 20, 1895. p. 49 – via Newspapers.com.
- "State Tennis Tourney: Some Fine Playing in the Recent Big Matches at Syracuse". Buffalo Courier. August 7, 1898. p. 3 – via Newspapers.com.
- "Congressman Magee Dies Suddenly in Office at Syracuse". The Ithaca Journal-News. Syracuse, New York. Associated Press. May 26, 1927. p. 7 – via Newspapers.com.

U.S. House of Representatives
Preceded by John R. Clancy	Member of the U.S. House of Representatives from New York's 35th congressional district 1915–1927	Succeeded by Clarence E. Hancock
