= New York's 44th congressional district =

Former congressional district

Coordinates: 42°47′N 78°40′W

- Obsolete district
- Created: 1945
- Eliminated: 1950
- Years active: 1945–1953

The 44th congressional district of New York was a congressional district for the United States House of Representatives in New York. It was created in 1945. It was eliminated as a result of the 1950 census. It was last represented by John C. Butler.

== List of members representing the district ==
| Member | Party | Years | Cong ress | Electoral history | District components |
|---|---|---|---|---|---|
District established January 3, 1945
| John C. Butler (Buffalo) | Republican | January 3, 1945 – January 3, 1949 | 79th 80th | Redistricted from the 42nd district, and re-elected in 1944. Re-elected in 1946. Lost re-election. | 1945–1953; Parts of Erie County |
| Chester C. Gorski (Buffalo) | Democratic | January 3, 1949 – January 3, 1951 | 81st | Elected in 1948. Lost re-election. | 1945–1953; Parts of Erie County |
| John C. Butler (Buffalo) | Republican | January 3, 1951 – January 3, 1953 | 82nd | Elected in 1950. Redistricted to the 42nd district and lost renomination. | 1945–1953; Parts of Erie County |
District dissolved January 3, 1953

== Election results ==
The following chart shows complete election results.

| Year | Democratic | Republican | American Labor |
|---|---|---|---|
| 1944 | Leon A. Dombrowski: 72,164 | ✓ John C. Butler (Incumbent): 72,402 | |
| 1946 | James B. Downey: 49,798 | ✓ John C. Butler (Incumbent): 67,495 | |
| 1948 | ✓ Chester C. Gorski: 79,795 | John C. Butler (Incumbent): 71,275 | Robert Williams: 3,062 |
| 1950 | Chester C. Gorski (Incumbent): 66,541 | ✓ John C. Butler: 69,260 | Rufus Frasier: 2,035 |
