= Hamilton, New York =

Town in Madison County, New York, US

- Town
- Location within New York Location within the United States
- Coordinates: 42°49′45″N 75°33′10″W
- Country: United States
- State: New York
- County: Madison

Government
  - Town Supervisor: Eve Ann Schwartz (D)
  - Town Council: Members: Dana Krueger, Travis DuBois, Darrell Griff, Ian Helfant

Area
  - Total: 41.48 sq mi (107.44 km^{2})
  - Land: 41.37 sq mi (107.14 km^{2})
  - Water: 0.12 sq mi (0.30 km^{2})

Population (2020)
  - Total: 6,379
  - Density: 154.2/sq mi (59.5/km^{2})
- Time zone: UTC-5 (EST)
  - Summer (DST): UTC-4 (EDT)
- ZIP Codes: 13346 (Hamilton); 13332 (Earlville); 13355 (Hubbardsville)
- FIPS code: 36-053-31720
- Website: www.townofhamiltonny.org

Hamilton is a town in Madison County, New York, United States. The population was 6,379 at the 2020 census. The town is named after American Founding Father Alexander Hamilton and is a college town, with Colgate University dominating the town's employment, culture and population.

The town of Hamilton contains a village also named Hamilton.

== History ==
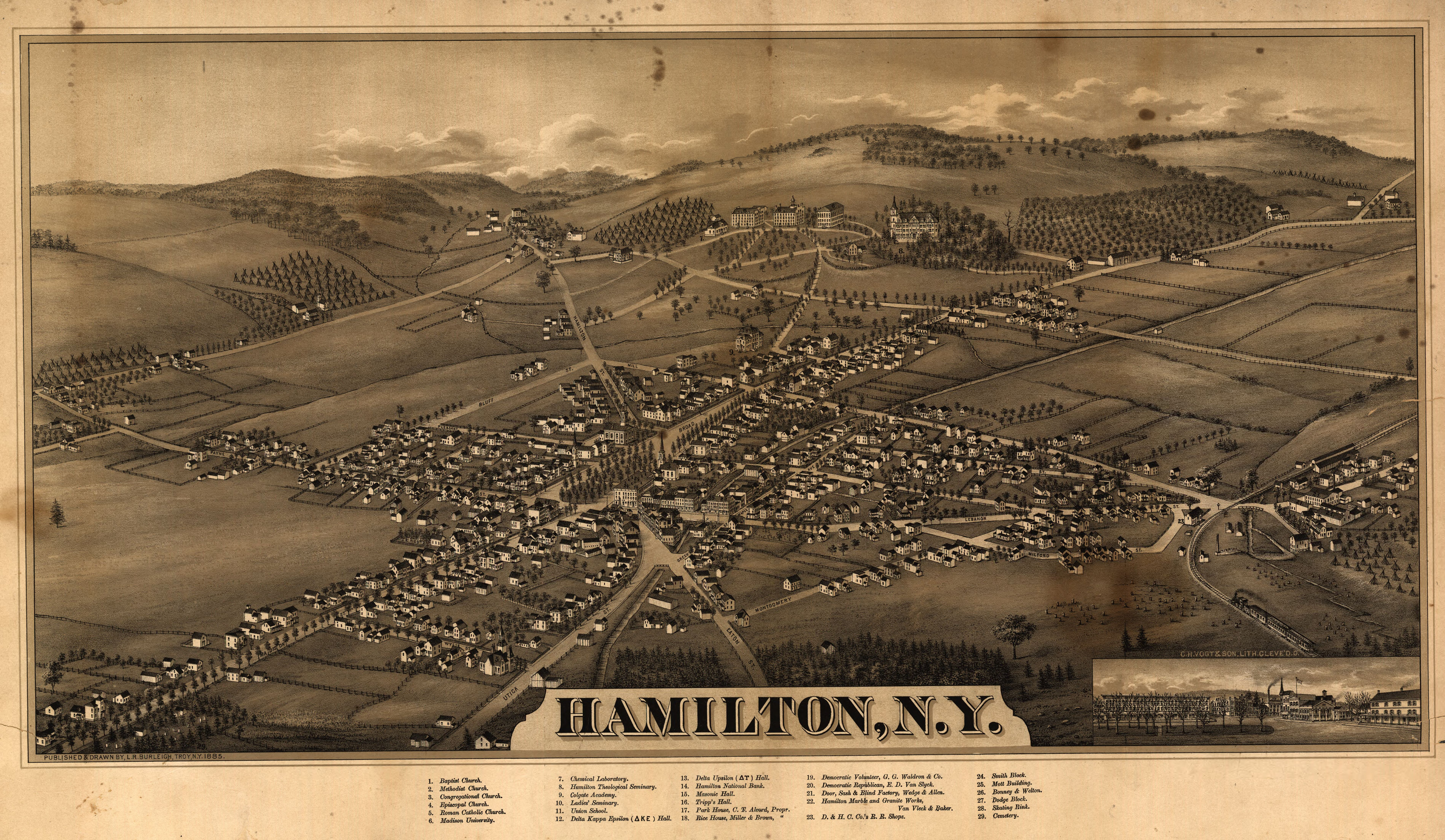
Perspective map of Hamilton and list of landmarks from 1885 by L.R. Burleigh

The location was formerly called "Payne's Corners". The town of Hamilton was established in 1795, before the county was formed, from the town of Paris in Oneida County. The original town was reduced to create new towns in the county.

The Mystic Order of Veiled Prophets of the Enchanted Realm, an appendant body in Freemasonry, was founded in Hamilton in 1890.

== Geography ==
The southern town line is the border of Chenango County. The village of Hamilton is in the northwest corner of the town, and the village of Earlville sits on the county line, with half of the village in the southwest corner of the town. New York State Route 12 crosses the southern and eastern parts of the town, leading northeast 25 miles (40 km) to Utica and south 22 miles (35 km) to Norwich. State Route 12B runs along the western edge of the town, connecting Earlville in the south with Hamilton village in the north; it continues south from Earlville 4 miles (6 km) to State Route 12 in Sherburne and north from Hamilton village 6 miles (10 km) to Madison.

According to the U.S. Census Bureau, the town of Hamilton has a total area of 41.5 square miles (107 km^{2}), of which 0.1 square miles (0.3 km^{2}), or 0.28%, is water. The town is within the watershed of the Chenango River, which briefly enters the town near its southwest corner. The Sangerfield River crosses the town from northeast to southwest and joins the Chenango south of Earlville. Pleasant Brook, another tributary of the Chenango, crosses the southeast part of the town.

== Demographics ==
Historical population
Census	Pop.	Note	%±
1820	2,681		—
1830	3,220		20.1%
1840	3,738		16.1%
1850	3,599		−3.7%
1860	3,894		8.2%
1870	3,687		−5.3%
1880	3,512		−4.7%
1890	3,923		11.7%
1900	3,744		−4.6%
1910	3,825		2.2%
1920	3,354		−12.3%
1930	3,687		9.9%
1940	3,618		−1.9%
1950	5,455		50.8%
1960	5,438		−0.3%
1970	5,906		8.6%
1980	6,027		2.0%
1990	6,221		3.2%
2000	5,733		−7.8%
2010	6,690		16.7%
2020	6,379		−4.6%
2021 (est.)	6,032	▼	−5.4%
U.S. Decennial Census

At the 2000 census there were 5,733 people, 1,546 households, and 935 families in the town. The population density was 138.6 inhabitants per square mile (53.5/km^{2}). There were 1,725 housing units at an average density of 41.7 per square mile (16.1/km^{2}). The racial makeup of the town was 93.65% White, 1.99% Black or African American, 0.07% Native American, 2.46% Asian, 0.03% Pacific Islander, 0.45% from other races, and 1.34% from two or more races. Hispanic or Latino of any race were 1.83%.

Of the 1,546 households, 28.7% had children under the age of 18 living with them, 49.1% were married couples living together, 8.2% had a female householder with no husband present, and 39.5% were non-families. 29.6% of households were one person and 12.4% were one person aged 65 or older. The average household size was 2.39 and the average family size was 2.96.

The age distribution was 15.7% under the age of 18, 40.8% from 18 to 24, 16.8% from 25 to 44, 15.8% from 45 to 64, and 11.0% 65 or older. The median age was 22 years. For every 100 females, there were 88.9 males. For every 100 females age 18 and over, there were 86.5 males.

The median household income was $38,917 and the median family income was $50,565. Males had a median income of $31,500 versus $26,643 for females. The per capita income for the town was $15,564. About 5.1% of families and 14.4% of the population were below the poverty line, including 10.4% of those under age 18 and 5.7% of those age 65 or over.

== Communities and locations in Hamilton ==
- Beekman Corners – A location between Hamilton village and East Hamilton.
- Brooks Corners – A hamlet in the south part of the town on Route 12.
- Colgate University is in the northwest part of the town, on a hill in the southeast corner of Hamilton village.
- Darts Corner – A location between Hamilton village and East Hamilton.
- Earlville – Part of the village of Earlville is located on the southern town line.
- East Hamilton – A hamlet on Route 12, east of Hamilton village.
- Excell Corners – A location northeast of South Hamilton.
- Hamilton – The village of Hamilton is in the northwestern part of the town.
- Hamilton Center – A hamlet southeast of Hamilton village.
- Hubbardsville – A hamlet north of East Hamilton village.
- Loomis Corners – A location northwest of South Hamilton.
- Poolville – A hamlet north of Brooks Corners.
- Shores Corners – A location between Hamilton village and East Hamilton.
- South Hamilton – A hamlet in the southeastern part of the town.

== Education ==
School districts with sections of the town include Hamilton Central School District, Sherburne-Earlville Central School District, and Brookfield Central School District.

Colgate University is in the town.

== Notable people ==
- John Vincent Atanasoff (1903–1995), inventor of the first digital computer
- Cordelia Throop Cole (1833–1900), social reformer
- Charles Josiah Galpin (1864–1947), academic and early researcher into rural sociology
- Harold O. Whitnall (1877–1945), geology professor at Colgate University and member of the New York State Assembly
