= Willis Wendell =

American politician (1858–1928)

Member of the New York State Senate from the 39th district
- In office January 1, 1925 – December 31, 1926
- Preceded by: Allen J. Bloomfield
- Succeeded by: John W. Gates

Personal details
- Born: September 2, 1858 Amsterdam, New York, U.S.
- Died: January 25, 1928 (aged 69)
- Party: Republican
- Spouse: Elizabeth Herrick (m. 1884)
- Children: 2
- Occupation: Politician, manufacturer

Willis Wendell (September 2, 1858 – January 25, 1928) was an American manufacturer and politician from New York.

== Life ==
Wendell was born on September 2, 1858, in Amsterdam, New York. He was the son of Harmon Wendell, a drug store proprietor and knit goods manufacturer in Amsterdam, and Almira M. Mosher.

After attending Amsterdam Academy, Wendell spent the next two years in Detroit, Michigan, where he worked for a grain commission house. He then returned to Amsterdam to take charge of his father's business, and after the latter's death in 1880 he sold the business. He mainly conducted a wholesale chemical, oil, and dyestuff business, and in 1887 he began building warehouses for storing raw materials and manufactured products. By 1925, he owned five large warehouses and was the vice president of the American Broom & Brush Company, the Atlas Knitting Company, and the Amsterdam City National Bank. He was also president of the Amsterdam Automatic Telephone Company and trustee of Empire Steam Laundry Company.

In 1924, Wendell was elected to the New York State Senate as a Republican, representing New York's 39th State Senate district (Madison, Otsego, Montgomery, and Schoharie Counties). He served in the Senate in 1925 and 1926.

In 1884, Wendell married Elizabeth Herrick of Amsterdam. They had two sons, Henry and Willis Jr. He was an original trustee of the Montgomery County Historical Society and a trustee of the Green Hill Cemetery Association. He was a member of the Freemasons, the Knights of Pythias, the Elks, and the Holland Society.

Wendell died at home after a long illness on January 25, 1928. He was buried in Green Hill Cemetery.

New York State Senate
Preceded by Allen J. Bloomfield	New York State Senate; 39th District; 1925–1926	Succeeded by John W. Gates
