= John R. Pillion =

American politician (1904–1978)

John Pillion
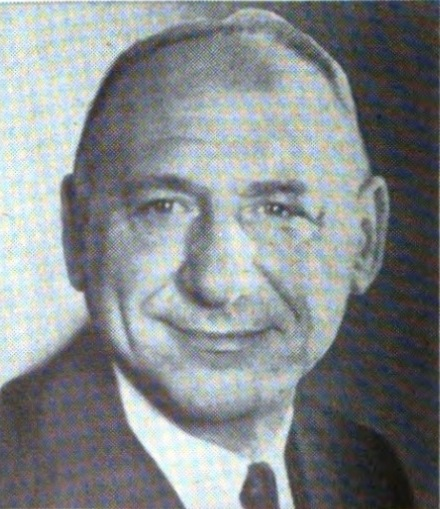

Member of the U.S. House of Representatives from New York
- In office January 3, 1953 – January 3, 1965
- Preceded by: William E. Miller
- Succeeded by: Richard D. McCarthy
- Constituency: 42nd district (1953–63); 39th district (1963–65)

Member of the New York State Assembly from the Erie County's 8th district
- In office 1941–1950
- Preceded by: R. Foster Piper
- Succeeded by: William Sadler

Personal details
- Born: August 10, 1904 Conneaut, Ohio, U.S.
- Died: December 31, 1978 (aged 74) Eden, New York, U.S.
- Party: Republican
- Education: Cornell Law School

John Raymond Pillion (August 10, 1904 – December 31, 1978) was an American lawyer and politician from New York.

== Life ==
He was born on August 10, 1904, in Conneaut, Ohio. He graduated from Cornell Law School in 1927. He practiced law in Erie County, New York. He was president and treasurer of the Bison Storage & Warehouse Corporation in Buffalo, and the owner and operator of a fruit and vegetable farm in Niagara County.

He was a city court judge in Lackawanna, New York from 1932 to 1936, and the Corporation Counsel and Tax Attorney of the City of Lackawanna from 1936 to 1941.

He was a member of the New York State Assembly (Erie Co., 8th D.) from 1941 to 1950, sitting in the 163rd, 164th, 165th, 166th and 167th New York State Legislatures.

He was elected as a Republican to the 83rd, 84th, 85th, 86th, 87th and 88th United States Congresses, holding office from January 3, 1953, to January 3, 1965. In Congress, he was most notable as an opponent of statehood for both Hawaii and Alaska. He was defeated for re-election in 1964 by Richard D. McCarthy. Pillion voted in favor of the Civil Rights Acts of 1957, 1960, and 1964, as well as the 24th Amendment to the U.S. Constitution.

He retired to Hamburg, and died in Eden, New York on December 31, 1978.

New York State Assembly
Preceded by R. Foster Piper	New York State Assembly; Erie County, 8th District; 1941–1950	Succeeded by William Sadler
U.S. House of Representatives
Preceded by William E. Miller	Member of the U.S. House of Representatives from New York's 42nd congressional district 1953–1963	Succeeded by district abolished
Preceded by Harold C. Ostertag	Member of the U.S. House of Representatives from New York's 39th congressional district 1963–1965	Succeeded by Richard D. McCarthy
