= James M. Mead =

American politician

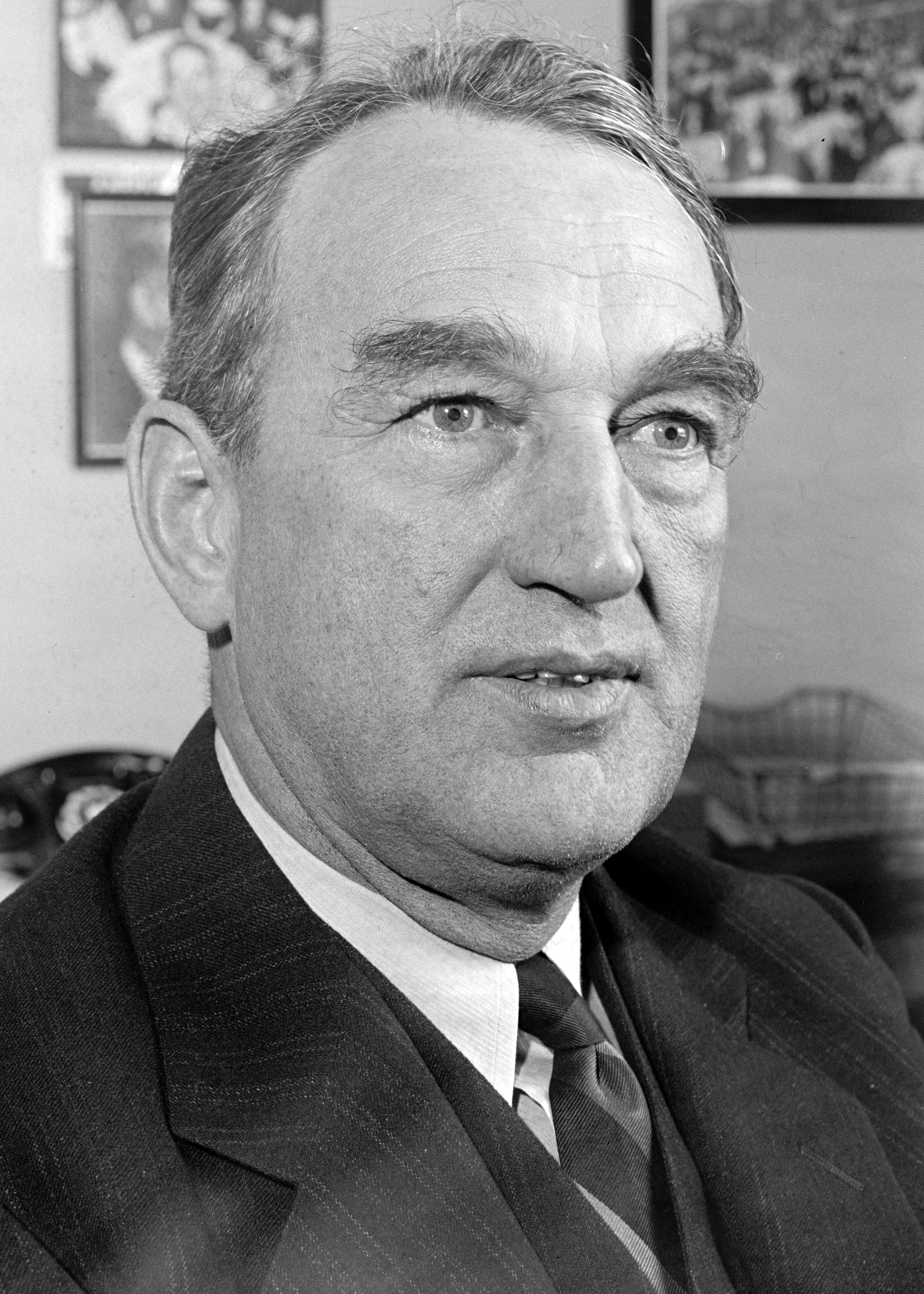
- Mead in 1937

United States Senator from New York
- In office December 3, 1938 – January 3, 1947
- Preceded by: Royal S. Copeland
- Succeeded by: Irving M. Ives

Chair of the Federal Trade Commission
- In office May 24, 1950 – March 31, 1953
- Preceded by: Lowell B. Mason
- Succeeded by: Edward F. Howrey

Member of the Federal Trade Commission
- In office November 15, 1949 – September 25, 1955
- Preceded by: Garland S. Ferguson
- Succeeded by: William C. Kern

Chairman of the United States House Committee on Post Office and Post Roads
- In office 1931–1938
- Preceded by: Archie D. Sanders
- Succeeded by: Milton A. Romjue

Member of the U.S. House of Representatives from New York's 42nd district
- In office March 4, 1919 – December 2, 1938
- Preceded by: William F. Waldow
- Succeeded by: Pius Schwert

Member of the New York State Assembly from the Erie County, 4th district
- In office January 1, 1915 – December 31, 1918
- Preceded by: Patrick W. Quigley
- Succeeded by: Andrew T. Beasley

Personal details
- Born: James Michael Mead; December 27, 1885 Mount Morris, New York, U.S.
- Died: March 15, 1964 (aged 78) Lakeland, Florida, U.S.
- Resting place: Oakhill Cemetery in Clermont, Florida
- Party: Democratic
- Spouse: Alice M. Dillon (m. 1915; died 1964)
- Children: 1

James Michael Mead (December 27, 1885 – March 15, 1964) was an American labor organizer, law enforcement officer, and Democratic Party politician from Buffalo, New York. He represented Buffalo in the United States House of Representatives from 1919 to 1938 and New York in the United States Senate from 1938 to 1947. He also chaired the Federal Trade Commission from 1950 to 1953, during the presidency of Harry S. Truman.

Mead was born in Mount Morris, New York and raised in Buffalo. He began working at the age of 12 as a water boy for the Delaware, Lackawanna and Western Railroad and later worked for the Pullman Company and Erie Railroad as a mechanic and switchman. He was president of the Buffalo local for the Switchmen's Union of North America before working for several years as an officer of the United States Capitol Police.

In 1913, Mead began a political career with his election to the Erie County board of supervisors. In the next year, he was elected to represent Buffalo in the New York State Assembly. After four terms in the Assembly, he was elected to the United States House of Representatives, where he served ten terms from 1919 until 1938 and chaired the Committee on the Post Office from 1931 to 1938. He resigned his seat upon election to the United States Senate. Mead gave up his Senate seat in 1946 to unsuccessfully challenge Governor of New York Thomas E. Dewey and Harry S. Truman later appointed him to the Federal Trade Commission, where he served from 1949 to 1953 and chaired the commission from 1950 to 1953.

== Early life ==
James M. Mead was born in Mount Morris, New York on December 27, 1885, a son of Thomas and Jane (Kelly) Mead. Mead moved to Buffalo with his family at the age of five. He attended Buffalo's grammar schools and began working at age 12. He was employed by the Delaware, Lackawanna and Western Railroad; his career included jobs as a water boy, lamp lighter, section hand, spike mauler, shop mechanic and switchman.

Mead later worked for the Pullman Company as a mechanic on sleep car dynamos. He was subsequently employed as a switchman on the Erie Railroad, and was eventually elected president of the Switchmen's Union's Buffalo local. From 1911 to 1914 he was employed as an officer with the United States Capitol Police.

== Start of career ==
Mead also continued his education during his railroad and police careers; he attended Buffalo's Caton School of Engineering and completed an engineering course of instruction at the Buffalo Institute of Technology. He also took courses at Canisius College and Catholic University. While working nights for the Capitol Police, Mead attended the Georgetown University Law Center during the day.

As a well-known semiprofessional football and baseball player in the Buffalo area, Mead developed a following that aided his entry into politics. In 1913, Mead was a successful candidate for a seat on the Erie County, New York Board of Supervisors and he served in 1914. In 1914 he ran for the New York State Assembly. He won the Erie County 4th District seat and won reelection in 1916. Mead served in the sessions of 1915, 1916, 1917, and 1918. In the Assembly, Mead won a reputation as a champion of worker's rights, including passage of a "full crew" law for freight trains, a law requiring workers to be paid every two weeks instead of every month, and an act mandating improved safety measures in train engine cabs. Among his successes were laws to improve the conditions of women and children in factories and enhancements to the state's worker's compensation laws. Mead's affability and power of persuasion marked him as an effective legislator despite the fact that he was a Democrat in a body controlled by Republicans.

== U.S. House ==
In 1918, Mead defeated incumbent Republican congressman William Frederick Waldow for New York's 42nd District seat in the U.S. House of Representatives. He was reelected nine times, and served from 1919 to 1938. From 1931 to 1938, Mead served as chairman of the Committee on Post Office and Post Roads. In Congress, Mead was a strong advocate for worker's rights, and received credit for aiding the passage of several labor measures, including the Railway Labor Act, Railroad Retirement Act, and Railroad Unemployment Insurance Act. Mead was the author of a law mandating a reduction in work hours for post office department employees to 44 hours per week, and later to 40 hours.

While supplementing his education by taking college courses during his Congressional service, Mead was well known for staying in good physical condition by trotting from campus to campus. At 6 feet 2 inches and 200 pounds, he maintained the athletic build of his youth, and was known as the House's best baseball and softball player. After 28 of his colleagues died during one session, Mead recognized the need for a Congressional gym and took the lead in organizing it and bringing it into operation.

According to John W. McCormack, who served as Speaker of the House from 1961 to 1971, the House's Democratic leaders were grooming Mead to become Speaker. McCormack went on to say that the only reason he (McCormack) was placed on the path that enabled him to become majority leader and then Speaker was that Mead left the House when he was elected to the U.S. Senate.

== U.S. Senate ==
In 1938, Mead defeated Republican Edward F. Corsi to fill the U.S. Senate seat left vacant after Royal S. Copeland died. He was re-elected in 1940, defeating Republican Congressman Bruce Barton.

In the Senate, Mead succeeded to the chairmanship of the Senate Special Committee to Investigate the National Defense Program (the Truman Committee) after Harry S. Truman was elected vice president in 1944. Under his leadership the committee continued Truman's effort to weed out wartime waste, corruption and inefficiency.

The committee's investigations under Mead's leadership resulted in Representative Andrew J. May's imprisonment for bribery and an extended debate on whether Senator Theodore G. Bilbo would be permitted to take his seat after winning reelection in 1946. The committee uncovered evidence that the racist Bilbo had sanctioned violence against African American veterans who attempted to vote in Mississippi's 1946 elections. In addition, there was evidence that Bilbo had accepted bribes from defense contractors in exchange for actions on their behalf during the war. The issue was resolved when Bilbo's credentials were tabled so he could return to Mississippi and seek treatment for oral cancer, an illness which proved fatal.

In 1946, Mead spoke at a rally of 20,000 participants in Madison Square Garden, protesting against Britain's reversal of its pro-Zionist policies in Mandatory Palestine. Mead claimed that "the conduct of the mandatory power and its administration in Palestine is in sharp contrast to the endless chain of commitments by the United States and the United Kingdom."

== Later career ==
Mead was an unsuccessful candidate for the Democratic nomination for governor in 1942. He was the Democratic candidate for Governor of New York in 1946, losing to Republican incumbent Thomas Dewey.

After Mead's defeat, he served on the Federal Trade Commission. Appointed in 1949, he became chairman six months later. He remained on the commission until 1955. From 1955 to 1956, he was the director of the Washington office of the New York Department of Commerce. Mead was also a New York delegate to the Democratic National Convention every four years from 1936 to 1952.

== Legacy ==
In 1937, the Works Progress Administration built a Buffalo public library that was later named the James Mead Branch Library.

Buffalo-area mail carriers recognized Mead's accomplishments on behalf of postal workers by naming their union local in his honor.

== Later life ==
After retiring from New York's Department of Commerce, Mead moved to Florida. He settled in Clermont, where he owned and operated an orange grove.

== Retirement and death ==
Mead died in Lakeland, Florida on March 15, 1964. He was buried at Oakhill Cemetery in Clermont.

== Family ==
In 1915, Mead married Alice M. Dillon (1885–1964). They were the parents of a son, James Michael Mead Jr. (1918–1997). Alice Mead was the sponsor of USS Leyte (CV-32) upon its launch in 1945.

New York State Assembly
Preceded by Patrick W. Quigley	New York State Assembly; Erie County, 4th District; 1915–1918	Succeeded by Andrew Beasley
U.S. House of Representatives
Preceded by William F. Waldow	Member of the U.S. House of Representatives from New York's 42nd congressional district 1919–1938	Succeeded by Pius L. Schwert
Preceded by Royal S. Copeland	U.S. senator (Class 1) from New York; 1938–1947	Succeeded by Irving M. Ives
Preceded by Harry S. Truman	Chair of the Senate National Defense Program Committee; 1944–1947	Succeeded by Owen Brewster
Party political offices
Preceded by Royal S. Copeland	Democratic nominee for U.S. Senator from New York (Class 1); 1938, 1940	Succeeded by Herbert H. Lehman
Preceded by John J. Bennett Jr.	Democratic Nominee for Governor of New York; 1946	Succeeded by Walter A. Lynch
