= Chester C. Gorski =

American politician

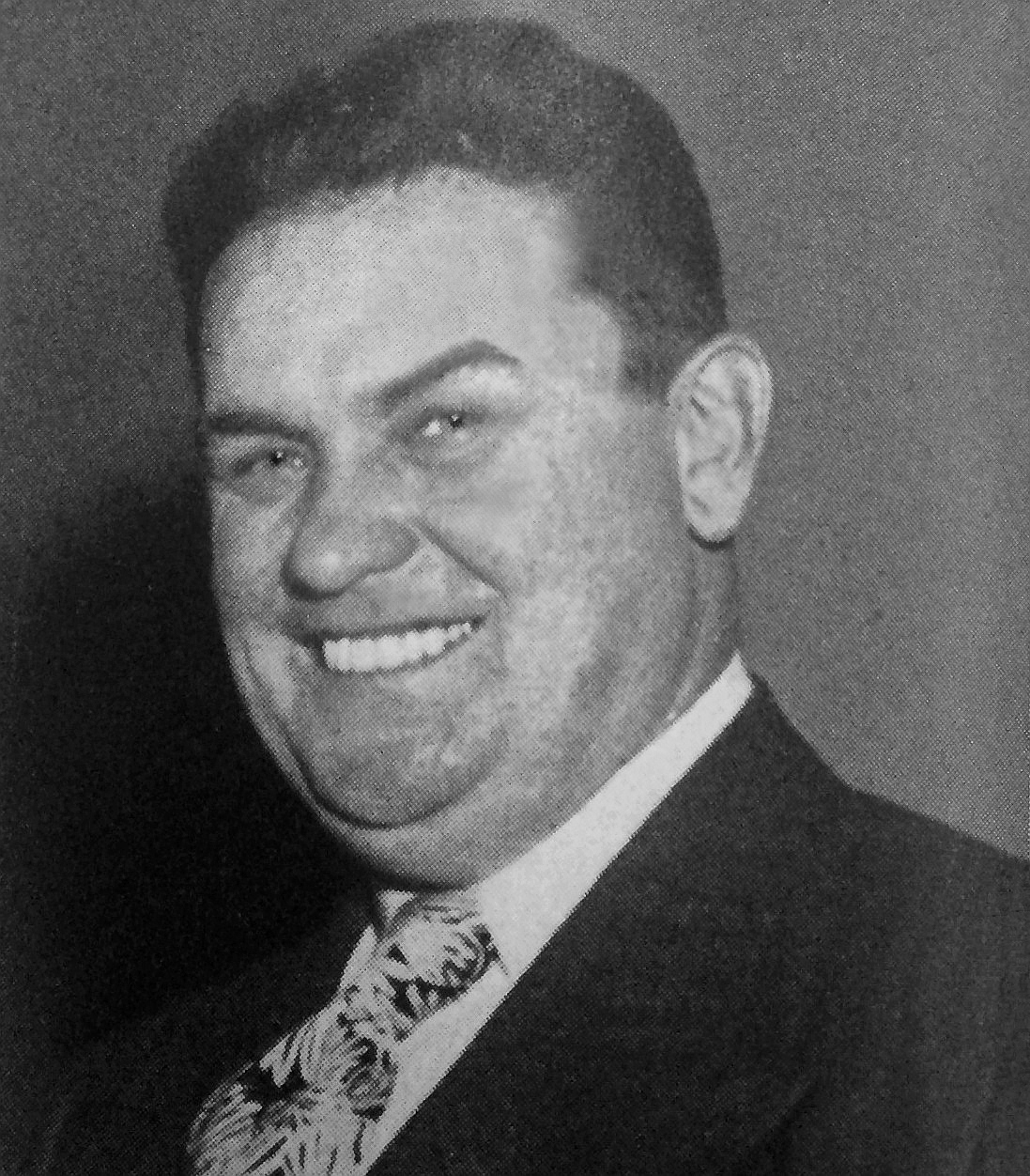
- Gorski in 1949

Member of the U.S. House of Representatives from New York's 44th district
- In office January 3, 1949 – January 3, 1951
- Preceded by: John C. Butler
- Succeeded by: John C. Butler

President of the Buffalo Common Council
- In office 1960–1974
- Preceded by: William B. Lawless Jr.
- Succeeded by: Delmar L. Mitchell

Member of the New York State Building Code Commission
- In office 1956–1959
- Preceded by: Walker S. Lee
- Succeeded by: None (commission abolished)

Member of the Buffalo Common Council
- In office 1954–1956
- Preceded by: Stephen B. Moskal
- Succeeded by: Peter A. Zawadzki
- Constituency: Lovejoy District
- In office 1946–1948
- Preceded by: John S. Rusek
- Succeeded by: Thaddeus S. Balicki
- Constituency: Lovejoy District

Member of the Erie County Board of Supervisors from Buffalo's 6th Ward
- In office 1941–1945
- Preceded by: Philip A. Baczkowski
- Succeeded by: Julian C. Kozlowski

Personal details
- Born: Chester Charles Gorski; June 22, 1906 Buffalo, New York, U.S.
- Died: April 25, 1975 (aged 68) Buffalo, New York, U.S.
- Resting place: Saint Stanislaus Roman Catholic Cemetery, Cheektowaga, New York, U.S.
- Party: Democratic
- Spouse: Helen T. Pieprzny
- Children: 2, (including Dennis Gorski)
- Occupation: Assistant foreman, Buffalo Streets Department; Liquor store owner

Chester Charles Gorski (June 22, 1906 – April 25, 1975) was an American politician from Buffalo, New York. A Democrat, he served one term in the United States House of Representatives from 1949 to 1951, and was the longtime president of the Buffalo Common Council.

== Life and career ==
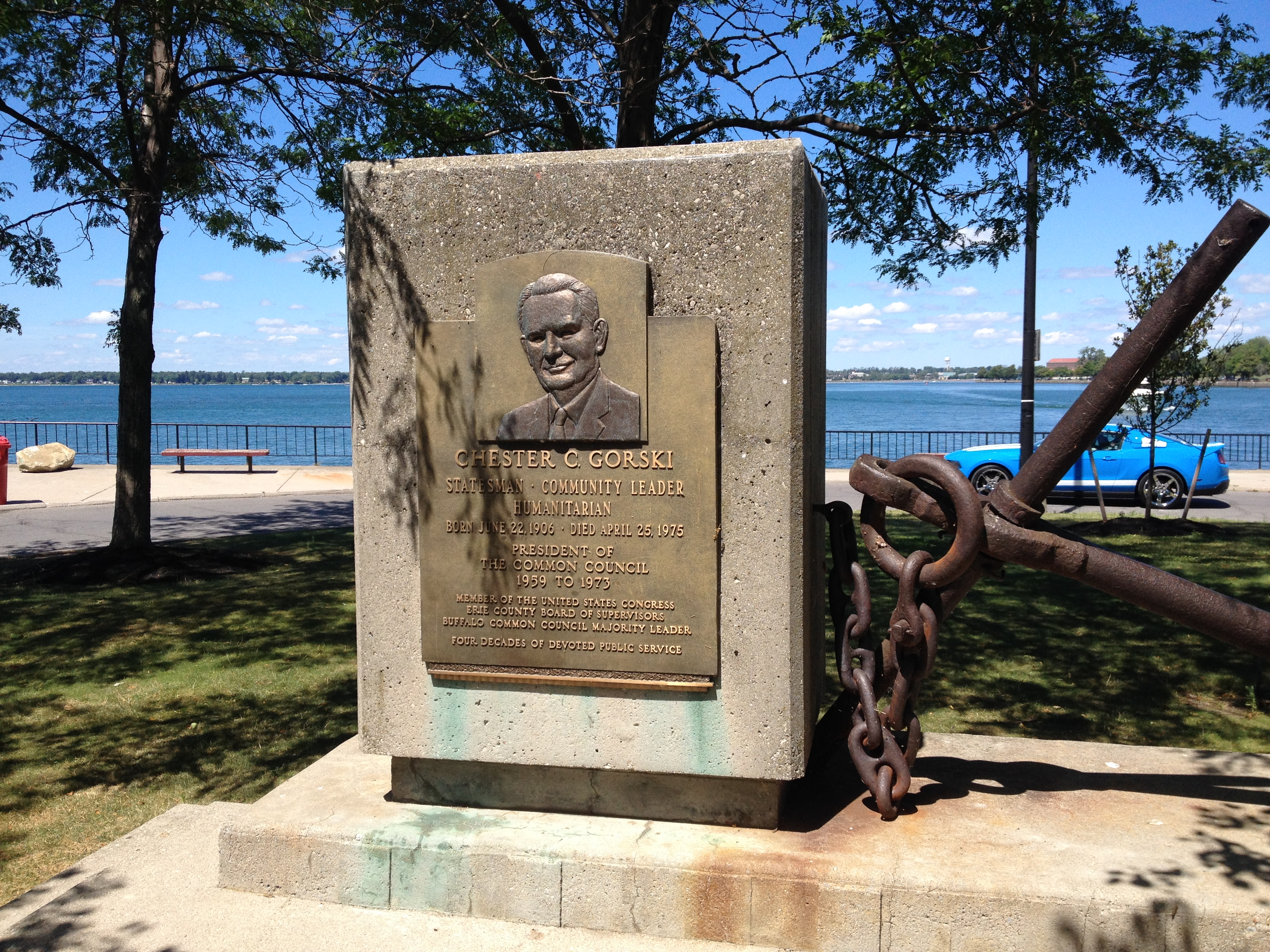
Memorial located at Erie Basin Marina near Observation Tower in Buffalo. "Chester C. Gorski, Statesman, Community Leader, Humanitarian. Born June 22, 1906. Died April 25, 1975. President of the Common Council, 1959 to 1973, member of the United States Congress, Erie County Board of Supervisors, Buffalo Common Council Majority Leader, Four Decades of Devoted Public Service."

Gorski was born June 22, 1906, in Buffalo, New York, to a Polish immigrant family. He attended Saints Peter and Paul Parochial School and Technical High School. After his high school graduation, Gorski was employed a laborer and assistant foreman in Buffalo's Streets Department, and also owned a liquor store.

=== Early political career ===
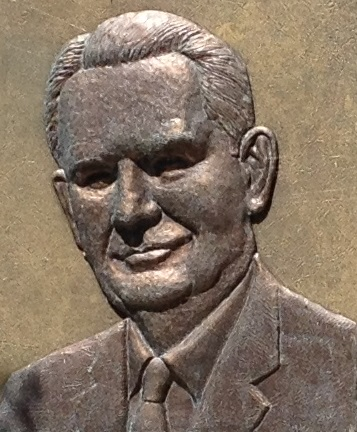
Closeup of Gorski memorial located at Erie Basin Marina near Observation Tower, Buffalo, New York.

Gorski became active in politics as a Democrat; he was a member of the Erie County Board of Supervisors from 1941 to 1945, and minority leader beginning in 1942. He served on the Buffalo Common Council from 1946 to 1948. He was a delegate to the Democratic National Conventions of 1948, 1952, 1956, and 1968.

=== Congress ===
In 1948 Gorski was elected to the United States House of Representatives as a Democrat. He served one term, January 3, 1949, to January 3, 1951, and was an unsuccessful candidate for reelection in 1950.

=== Later career and death ===
After leaving Congress Gorski was employed by the U.S. Department of Commerce as an industrial analyst from 1951 to 1952. He served on the Buffalo Common Council again from 1954 to 1956. From 1956 to 1959 he was a member of the New York State Building Code Commission. In 1960 Gorski returned to the Buffalo Common Council as its president, and he served until resigning in 1974 because of ill health.

He died in Buffalo on April 25, 1975. He was buried at Saint Stanislaus Roman Catholic Cemetery in Cheektowaga, New York.

== Family ==
Gorski was married to Helen T. Pieprzny. They were the parents of two sons, Erie County Executive Dennis Gorski and New York State Supreme Court Justice Jerome Gorski.

U.S. House of Representatives
Preceded by John Cornelius Butler	Member of the U.S. House of Representatives from New York's 44th congressional district January 3, 1949 – January 3, 1951	Succeeded by John Cornelius Butler
