= Charles Josiah Galpin =

American rural sociologist

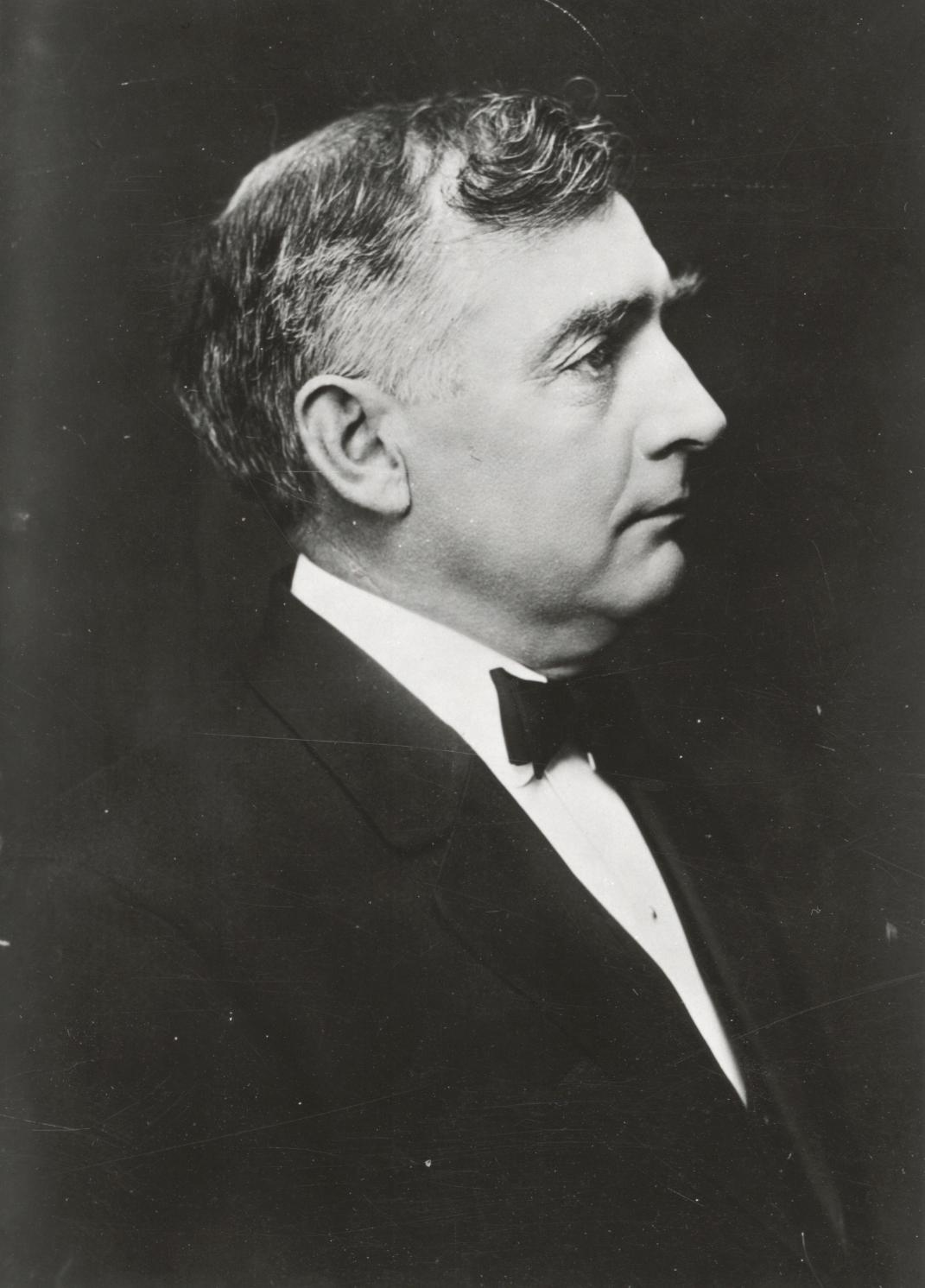
- Born: Charles Josiah Galpin; March 16, 1864; Hamilton, New York
- Died: June 1, 1947 (aged 83)
- Education: Madison University later known as Colgate University (A.B., 1885; A.M., 1888) Harvard University (A.M., 1895) Colgate University (1919) Honorary Doctorate
- Occupations: Teacher of science & mathematics – Union Academy in Belleville (1885–1888) Professor of History and English – Kalamazoo College (1888–1891) Principle Union Academy (1891–1901) Businessman – (1900–1904) Pastor – Baptist Church of Madison (1905–1911) Lecturer – School of Religion, Madison (1909–1912) Professor – University of Wisconsin, Department of Agricultural Economics (1911–1919) Head of the Division of Farm Population and Rural Life, Bureau of Agricultural Economics, United States Department of Agriculture (1919–1934)
- Notable work: The Social Anatomy of an Agricultural Community (1915) Rural Life (1918) My Drift into Rural Sociology (1938) Rural Social Problems (1924)

Charles Josiah Galpin (March 16, 1864 – June 1, 1947) was an American academic. Galpin was a trailblazer of rural sociology, known for advancing research in analysis of rural populations, rural standards of living, rural social organization, and social structures. Galpin was a rural sociologist, professor, author, pastor, and advocate for rural populations. He published 112 works in 245 publications in one language and 2,667 library holdings including The Social Anatomy of an Agricultural Community (1915); Rural Life (1918); My Drift into Rural Sociology (1938); and Rural Social Problems (1924). His early career set the stage for his influential contribution as the Head of the Division of Farm Population and Rural Life, Bureau of Agricultural Economics, United States Department of Agriculture. The reach of his contributions extend beyond rural sociology to include contributions in ecology and public health.

== Early life ==
Born in Hamilton, New York, the descendant of a line of farmers, and the son of a country minister, his roots in rural America began in the 16th century as the Galpin family immigrated from England to the farm valley of Connecticut. Galpin's native rural milieu and religious upbringing were integral to his future professional trajectory. He received a scholarship from the Colgate University class of 1862 (his father's college class) which allowed him to attend Colgate Academy and Colgate University. Determined to be a good steward of this scholarship, he graduated as valedictorian with special honors in the classics and mathematics from Colgate Academy. Galpin, a life-long learner, continued to pursue knowledge from many disciplines. Galpin furthered his education at Harvard in the Department of Philosophy. His thesis was a critical analysis of Haeckel's Creation. Galpin was greatly influenced through his professors at Harvard as they sharpened his perspective from an ethical, sociological, and scientific lens. In the pursuit of bolstering his knowledge of children and human development, Galpin completed courses through Clark University in psychology and anthropology.

== Career ==
As Headmaster of Union Academy, Galpin immersed himself in the Belleville, New York farm community and recognized his influence on community policy as the "school I administered was the real nerve center of the farm community". His spirit of inquiry and reflective nature propelled him to learn about the scientific character of agriculture and the importance of viewing farmers and farming from a scientific lens. Subsequently, in 1901 Galpin was compelled to establish the first department of agriculture in a United States high school at Union Academy. He recognized the scientific underpinnings of agriculture that were essential to current students and future generations in this farm community.

He spent a period of time away from academics and immersed himself in rural life, farming with primitive tools, supervising a milk plant, and engaging with rural farmers.

Galpin, through his brother's connections, in 1905, transitioned into a role as a university pastor for students of the University of Wisconsin. During this time Galpin met Dr. H.C. Taylor, agricultural economist for the University of Wisconsin. The exchange of thoughts and ideas about rural life between Galpin and Taylor became a turning point in Galpin's career.

Galpin without formal training in sociology was hired as a member of faculty in the Department of Agricultural Economics, University of Wisconsin in 1911. Dr. Taylor noted that Galpin was chosen because he had shown a spark of originality, manifested the power to think, see relations of things, and the significance of the commonplace. Through his teaching, research, and service during his eight years at the University of Wisconsin Galpin became admired as a pioneer in his field. In addition to writing bulletins, circulars, presentations for the Country Life Conferences, and authoring The Social Anatomy of an Agricultural Community, Rural Life. Galpin's passion to improve country life extended beyond the walls of academia. He was compelled to action and used his influence to inspire country people to organize and study how to improve community agencies which determine the quality of country life.

In 1919, Galpin's colleague of 14 years, H.C. Taylor, accepted the appointment of Chief of the Office of Farm Management United States Department of Agriculture in Washington D.C. In May 1919, Galpin was invited to head the division of research, Office of Farm Management, which would later be called the Division of Farm Population and Rural Life, Bureau of Agricultural Economics, United States Department of Agriculture.

== Contributions ==
=== Rural Sociology ===
Galpin, as the Head of the Division of Farm Population and Rural Life, led efforts to build a knowledge base about rural life in the United States. Galpin advanced three areas of research: farm population, rural organization, and farm family standards of living.

Farm Population

Galpin leveraged his influence to convince the Bureau of the Census to demonstrate the value of farm population data at the county level. Galpin ranked establishing farm population statistics as one of the Division's major accomplishments Rural migration studies during Galpin's leadership in the Division of Farm Population and Rural Life provided deeper understanding of the complexity of the relationships between rural migration and socioeconomic factors. Some of the factors analyzed in these studies included: rural fertility ratios, quality of land, educational facilities, rural living index, and distance to cities.

Rural Social Organization

Porter and Howell (2004) suggest that the origins of community research in rural sociology can be traced to Galpin's thorough analysis of the agricultural community in Walworth County, WI. In his analysis, Galpin identified an organized space where a pattern of interactions were created, maintained, and standardized. Galpin's original maps remain relevant today as the same community indicators are still being conceptualized. Galpin's early work continues to be useful in geo-social research. in particular the Point-and-Grid map Galpin used to analyze school zones identifying a "convex hull" around the furthest students' home location. The "convex hull" technique is used in geographic information science studies of behavioral phenomena.

Farm Family Standards of Living

Galpin prioritized farm family living research as one of the main research areas for the Division of Farm Population and Rural Life. During his leadership, Galpin placed E.L. Kirkpatrick to the Division of Farm Population and Rural Life staff to lead research on the living conditions of farm families. The drivers for this research focus stemmed from the collapse of agricultural prices in 1920 and the interest in the relationship between farm living conditions and farm to city migration.

=== Human Ecology ===
Galpin's contribution to early human ecology in the United States is not as well known. However, Mowrer (1938) describes Galpin's contribution to ecology in defining the boundary differentiation from one rural community to another. Subsequently, the University of Chicago, Department of Sociology, influenced by Galpin's work, discovered 75 different areas within the designated political boundaries in Chicago. Through this identification of parks, waterways, industrial property, vacant property changes in community elements were noted.

=== Public health ===
Galpin was an advocate and crusader for the rural American population. His early work in Walworth County and later works, Rural Life and Rural Social Problems, address social determinants of health (SDOH) which are defined as the environments where people are born, live, learn, work, and age that affect a wide range of health and quality of life outcomes and risks. He discusses the five domains of SDOH including economic stability, education access and quality, health care access, neighborhood and social community in the context of rurality.

== Honors and legacy ==
Throughout his professional life, Galpin served his community, country and internationally with notable appointments. He served as honorary president of the "American Country Life Association" In 1932, Galpin served as vice-president of the American Sociological Society. He was appointed as a United States delegate to the "General Assembly of the International Institute of Agriculture" (Rome & Brussels).

== Personal life ==
At the age of 23 Galpin married Miss Zoe Wickwire from Hamilton, New York. In his work My Drift into Rural Sociology (1938), he commented on his wife "who has made our home and cheered me up and on for 50 years now".

Galpin was respected by his colleagues. Henry C. Taylor, an agricultural economist pioneer, noted, "Due to your influence more than that of any other man in America, agricultural economics has ceased to be simply a farm economics....and has found its center of interest in the standards of living, in the quality of the life and the cultural developments of the minds and the hearts of farm people in harmony with the purposes of the great personality that pervades the universe."

== Selected works ==
"The Social Anatomy of an Agricultural Community" (1915) is Galpin's classic and most notable work. His analysis, techniques, and perspectives to study Walworth County, Wisconsin continue to influence sociology scholars.

Galpin's first book, "Rural Life" (1918) provides analysis of farm communities and the discovery of a repeating socioeconomic unit.

The theme of "Rural Social Problems" (1924) is the human element surrounding the issues of agriculture and country life. The definition, measures of farmers' standard of living, and addressing gaps is considered through a multidisciplinary approach. In addition, Galpin's book contributes to knowledge of rural conditions and methods of study.

Galpin's memoir, "My Drift into Rural Sociology" (1938), reflects on his professional trajectory and rural sociology research.

"The Development of the Science and Philosophy of American Rural Society" (1938), provides an opportunity for Galpin to cast a vision for future scholarly endeavors in rural sociology. Rural society with varying social and economic interrelations are a function of psychosocial constructs within human nature. Rural society can not be viewed purely philosophically; Galpin suggests that rural culture needs to be further investigated through an anthropological approach.

== Quotes ==
"Hope is 'Vitamine No. 1' in service. Without hope in the heart of the man or woman who serves, ministration mysteriously fails to minister"
