= Franchot =

Franchot is a surname of French origin. It may refer to:

- Charles-Louis-Félix Franchot (1809–1881), French designer and inventor .
- Nicholas Van Vranken Franchot (1855–1943), New York Superintendent of Public Works
- Nicholas V. V. Franchot II (1884–1938), New York assemblyman
- Peter Franchot (born 1947), Maryland Comptroller
- Richard Franchot (1816–1875), U.S. Representative from New York, Union Army officer
- Stanislaus P. Franchot (1851–1908), New York state senator

== See also ==
- Franchot Tone (Stanislaus Pascal Franchot Tone, 1905–1968), American actor
