= Samuel F. Miller =

19th century American politician

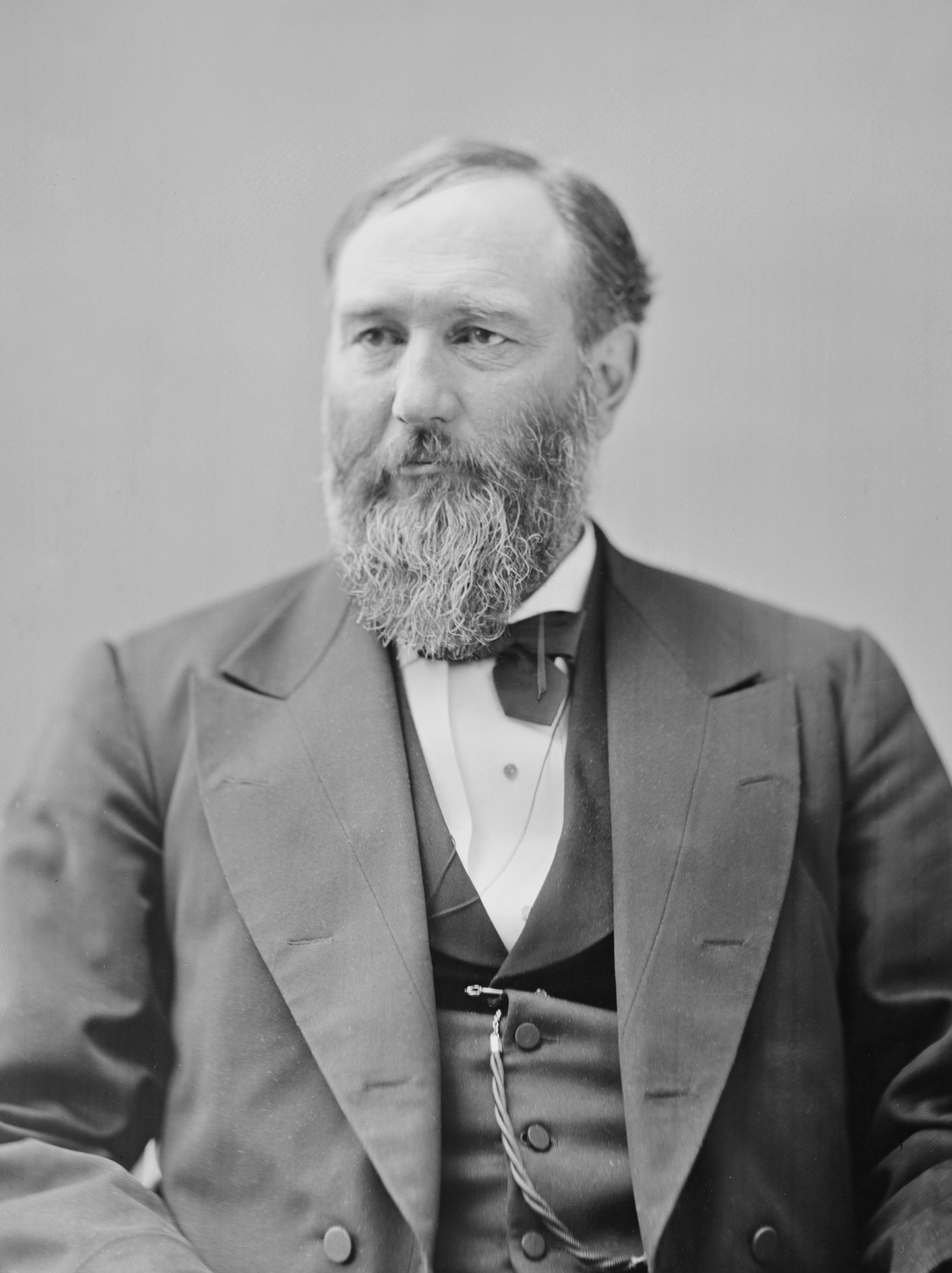

Member of the U.S. House of Representatives from New York
- In office March 4, 1863 – March 3, 1865
- Preceded by: Richard Franchot
- Succeeded by: Demas Hubbard, Jr.
- Constituency: 19th district
- In office March 4, 1875 – March 3, 1877
- Preceded by: Clinton L. Merriam
- Succeeded by: Solomon Bundy
- Constituency: 21st district

Member of the New York State Assembly from the Delaware County, 1st district
- In office January 1, 1854 – December 31, 1854
- Preceded by: Charles S. Rogers
- Succeeded by: William B. Smith

Personal details
- Born: May 27, 1827 Franklin, New York
- Died: March 16, 1892 (aged 64) Franklin, New York
- Party: Republican

Samuel Franklin Miller (May 27, 1827 – March 16, 1892) was a United States representative from New York during the latter half of the American Civil War.

Miller was born in Franklin, Delaware County, New York on May 27, 1827. He graduated from the Delaware Literary Institute, then studied law at Hamilton College, Clinton, New York, from which he graduated in 1852. Miller was admitted to the bar in 1853, but instead of practicing law instead engaged in farming and lumbering.

Miller was elected as a member of the New York State Assembly for Delaware County (1st District) in 1854. He served as a colonel in the State militia and was elected as a Republican to the 38th United States Congress from March 4, 1863, to March 3, 1865. He was a member of the State constitutional convention in 1867, district collector of internal revenue from 1869 to 1873, and a member of the State board of charities from 1869 to 1877. He was elected to the 44th United States Congress from March 4, 1875, to March 3, 1877.

After leaving politics, Miller lived at his farm in North Franklin, where he engaged in agricultural pursuits and lumbering. He died in Franklin on March 16, 1892, and was interred there, in Ouleout Valley Cemetery.

New York State Assembly
Preceded by Charles S. Rogers	New York State Assembly; Delaware County, 1st District; 1854	Succeeded by William B. Smith
U.S. House of Representatives
Preceded by Richard Franchot	Member of the U.S. House of Representatives from New York's 19th congressional district 1863–1865	Succeeded by Demas Hubbard, Jr.
Preceded by Clinton L. Merriam	Member of the U.S. House of Representatives from New York's 21st congressional district 1875–1877	Succeeded by Solomon Bundy
