= Nicholas V. V. Franchot =

Nicholas V. V. Franchot may refer to:

- Nicholas Van Vranken Franchot (1855–1943), New York State Superintendent of Public Works
- Nicholas V. V. Franchot II (1884–1938), New York assemblyman
