= 121st New York Infantry Regiment =

- New York flag
- Active: August 23, 1862, to June 25th, 1865
- Country: United States
- Allegiance: Union
- Branch: Infantry
- Engagements: American Civil War: Battle of Antietam; Battle of Fredericksburg; Second Battle of Fredericksburg; Battle of Gettysburg; Bristoe Campaign; Rappahannock Station; Mine Run Campaign; Battle of the Wilderness; Battle of Spotsylvania Court House; Battle of Cold Harbor; Siege of Petersburg; Second Battle of Petersburg; Battle of Fort Stevens; Third Battle of Winchester; Battle of Fisher's Hill; Battle of Cedar Creek; Battle of Sailor's Creek; Battle of Appomattox Court House

Commanders
- Colonel: Richard Franchot
- Colonel: Emory Upton

Insignia
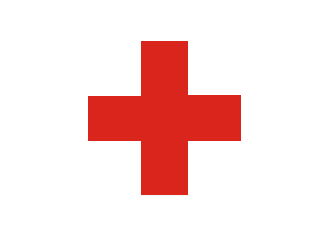
- VI Corps (1st Division) badge

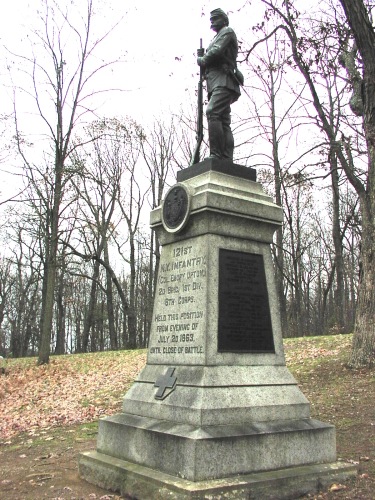
Monument to the 121st Regiment at Gettysburg

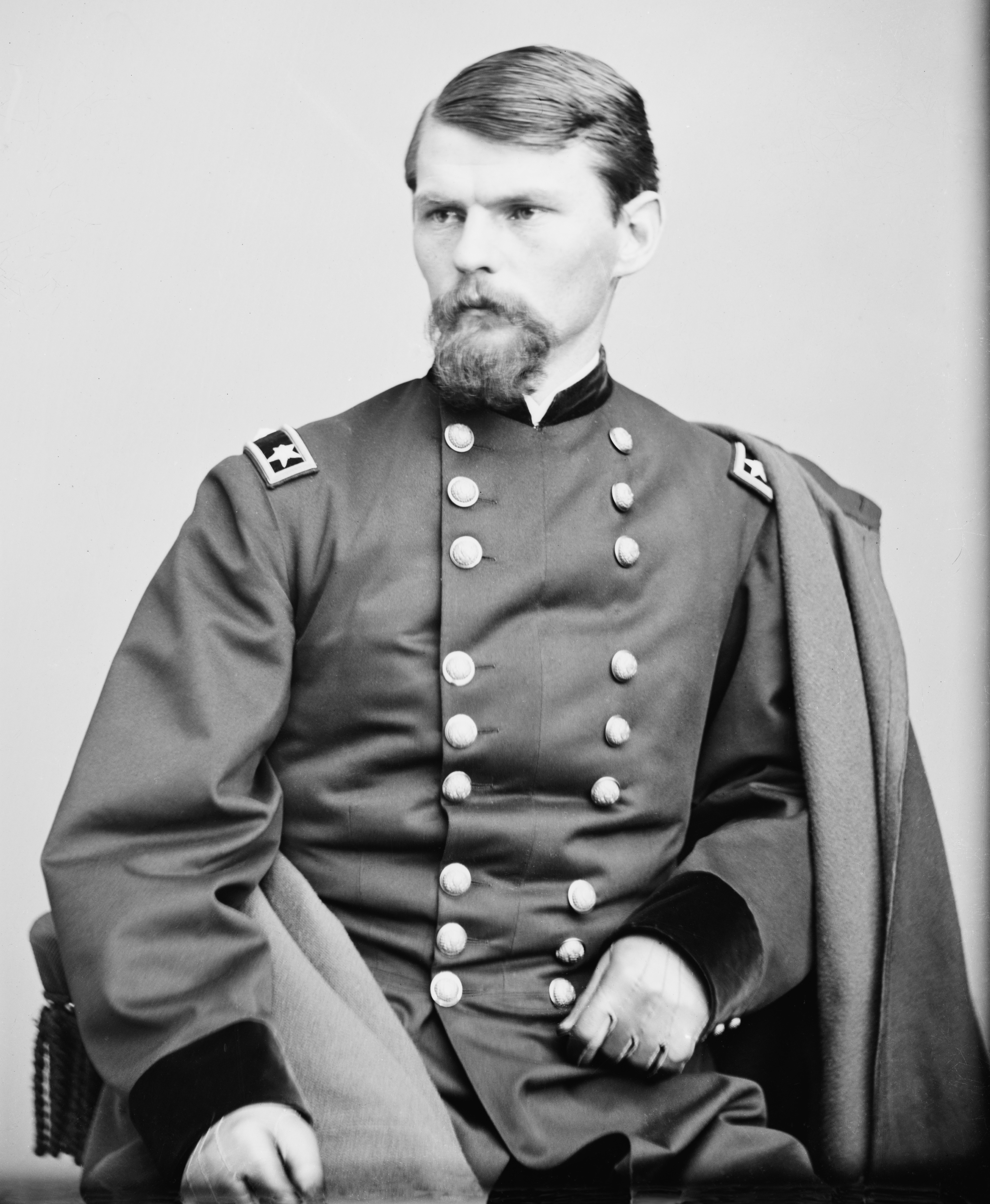
Emory Upton

The 121st New York Infantry Regiment, commonly known as the "Onesers" or "Upton's Regulars", was a volunteer regiment recruited during the American Civil War from Otsego County and Herkimer County, New York. The Hon. Richard Franchot was appointed colonel of the regiment and authorized to establish his headquarters at Richfield Springs, Otsego County. He proceeded without delay to organize the regiment, and on August 23, 1862, the regiment was mustered into the service of the Union Army. The command at that time consisted of 39 officers and 946 enlisted men. The 121st Regiment proceeded to Washington, arriving there on the morning of September 3, and was assigned provisionally to a brigade under Colonel Gibson with headquarters at Fort Lincoln.

On the march to the South Mountain and Antietam battlefields the regiment was assigned to the Second Brigade, First Division, Sixth Corps and remained with the command during its entire term of service.

Colonel Richard Franchot resigned on September 25, 1862, and selected Colonel Emory Upton, at the time a first lieutenant in the Regular army, as his successor.

There is an interesting controversy concerning who captured Confederate Major General Custis Lee, son of Robert E. Lee, at the Battle of Sailor's Creek Virginia on April 6, 1865. Private Harris Hawthorn of the 121st New York claimed his capture and applied for and received the Medal of Honor for this act in the year 1894. The 37th Massachusetts Infantry disputed this award in the year 1897, claiming that Private David Dunnels White of their regiment was the actual captor of Major General Custis Lee. This entire matter is currently under review by the United States Army.

== Organization ==
The companies were recruited principally from these towns and organized by region:

- A Company: Manheim, Little Falls, Salisbury, and Danube
- B Company: Winfield, Plainfield, Litchfield, German Flatts, Columbia, and Stark
- C Company: Fairfield, Russia, Herkimer, and Newport
- D Company: Frankfort, Warren, Manheim, Schuyler, Columbia, and Salisbury
- E Company: Middlefeild, Milford, Cherry Valley, Hartwick, Springfield, Otsego, and Roseboom
- F Company: Edmeston, Exeter, Unadilla, Otsego, and Maryland
- G Company: Cherry Valley, Roseboom, Decatur, Middlefield, Westford, Worcester, and Herkimer
- H Company: Little Falls, Richfield, Salisbury, and Otesego
- I Company: Milford, Laurens, Morris, Wochester, Pittsfield, Hartwick, and German Flatts
- K Company: Laurens, New Lisbon, Oneonta, Burlington, Otesgo, Butternuts, Pittsfield, and Plainfield

== See also ==
- List of New York Civil War regiments

== Affiliations, battle honors, detailed service, and casualties ==
=== Organizational affiliation ===
Attached to 2nd Brigade, 3rd Division, VI Corps Division of the Potomac, to June, 1865.

=== List of battles ===
The official list of battles in which the regiment bore a part:

- Battle of Antietam
- Battle of Fredericksburg
- Second Battle of Fredericksburg
- Battle of Gettysburg
- Bristoe Campaign
- Rappahannock Station
- Mine Run Campaign
- Battle of the Wilderness
- Battle of Spotsylvania Court House
- Battle of Cold Harbor
- Siege of Petersburg
- Second Battle of Petersburg
- Battle of Fort Stevens
- Third Battle of Winchester
- Battle of Fisher's Hill
- Battle of Cedar Creek
- Battle of Sailor's Creek
- Battle of Appomattox Court House

=== Detailed service ===
==== 1862 ====
- Maryland Campaign September 6–22.
  - Battle of Antietam September 16–17.
  - Duty In Sharpsburg, MD till October 30.
- March up the Potomac to Leesburg, thence to Falmouth, VA, October 11-November 18.
- Battle of Fredericksburg December 12–16.
- At Falmouth till April, 1863.

==== 1863 ====
- "Mud March" January 20–24.
- Moved to Newport News, VA, March 13
- Chancellorsville Campaign April 27-May 6.
  - Operations at Franklin's Crossing April 29-May 2.
  - Battle of Maryes Heights, Fredericksburg. May 3.
  - Salem Heights May 3–4.
  - Banks' Ford May 4.
- Gettysburg campaign June 14-July 24.
  - Battle of Gettysburg July 2–4.
  - Pursuit of Lee to Manassas Gap, Va., July 5–24.
- Duty on line of the Rappahannock and Rapidan till October.
- Bristoe Campaign October 9–22.
  - Advance to line of the Rappahannock November 7–8.
  - Second Battle of Rappahannock Station November 7.
- Mine Run Campaign November 26-December 2.

==== 1864 ====
- Campaign from the Rapidan to the James May 3-June 15.
  - Battle of the Wilderness May 6–7;
  - Spotsylvania May 8–12;
  - Ny River May 10
  - Spotsylvania Court House May 12–21.
  - Assault on the Salient May 12.
- North Anna River May 23–26.
- On line of the Pamunkey May 26–28.
- Totopotomoy May 28–31.
- Cold Harbor June 1–12.
- Before Petersburg June 16–18.
- Second Battle of Petersburg June 16, 1864.
- Jerusalem Plank Road June 22–23.
- Moved to Washington, D. C, July 9–11.
- Repulse of Early's attack on Fort Stevens and the Northern Defences of Washington July 11–12.
- Expedition to Snicker's Gap July 14–23.
- Sheridan's Shenandoah Valley Campaign August 7-November 28.
  - Near Charleston August 21–22.
  - Third Battle of Winchester September 19.
  - Battle of Fisher's Hill September 22.
  - Mt. Jackson September 23–24.
  - Battle of Cedar Creek October 19.
  - Duty in the Shenandoah Valley till December.
- Moved to Petersburg, Va., December 9–12.

==== 1865 ====
- Siege of Petersburg December 12, 1864, to April 2, 1865.
  - Dabney's Mills, Hatcher's Run, February 5–7, 1865.
- Appomattox Campaign March 28-April 9.
  - Assault on and fall of Petersburg April 2.
  - Battle of Sailor's Creek April 6.
  - Battle of Appomattox Court House April 9.
- Surrender of Lee and his army.
- At Farmville and Burkesville till April 23.
- March to Danville April 23–27 and duty there till May 24.
- March to Richmond, thence to Washington, D. C, May 24-June 3.
- Corps Review June 8.
- Mustered out June 25, 1865.
- Veterans and Recruits transferred to 65th New York Infantry.
