= Elizur H. Prindle =

American politician (1829–1890)

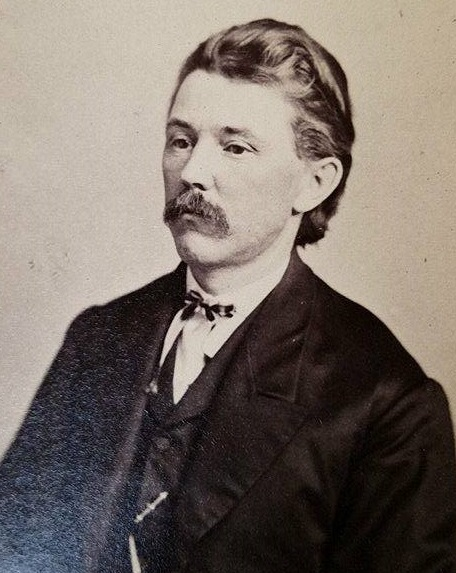
- From Photographs of the Officers and Members of the Constitutional Convention of the State of New York, 1867.

Member of the New York State Assembly for Chenango County, 1st District
- In office 1863–1863
- Preceded by: David B. Parce
- Succeeded by: George W. Sumner

Member of the U.S. House of Representatives from New York's 19th district
- In office March 4, 1871 – March 3, 1873
- Preceded by: Charles Knapp
- Succeeded by: Henry H. Hathorn

Personal details
- Born: May 6, 1829 Newtown, Connecticut, U.S.
- Died: October 7, 1890 (aged 61) Norwich, New York, U.S.
- Resting place: Mount Hope Cemetery, Norwich, New York, U.S.
- Party: Republican
- Other political affiliations: Whig

Elizur H. Prindle (May 6, 1829 – October 7, 1890) was a U.S. representative from New York.

== Biography ==
Prindle was born in Newtown, Connecticut on May 6, 1829. He was raised in Unadilla, New York, completed preparatory studies, and attended the local academy in Homer, New York.

He studied law with his cousin, Horace Gerald Prindle of Unadilla, was admitted to the bar in 1854 and began to practice.

Prindle later moved to Norwich, New York, where he continued to practice law. Originally a Whig, and later a Republican, he was district attorney of Chenango County, New York from 1860 to 1862.

At the start of the American Civil War he was one of several leading citizens in Norwich who worked to raise a company for the Union Army, which was mustered in as Company H, 17th New York Volunteer Infantry. Later in the war he took part in raising a company which was mustered in as part of 114th New York Volunteer Infantry.

He was a member of the New York State Assembly (Chenango Co., 1st D.) in 1863, and a delegate to the New York State Constitutional Convention of 1867–1868.

Prindle was elected as a Republican to the 42nd United States Congress, holding office from March 4, 1871 to March 3, 1873. After leaving Congress Prindle resumed the practice of law.

He died in Norwich on October 7, 1890, and was interred in Norwich's Mount Hope Cemetery.

== Sources ==
=== Books ===
Smith, James Hadden (1880). History of Chenango and Madison Counties. Vol. I. Syracuse, NY: D. Mason & Co.

New York State Assembly
Preceded by David B. Parce	New York State Assembly; Chenango County, 1st District; 1863	Succeeded by George W. Sumner
U.S. House of Representatives
Preceded by Charles Knapp	Member of the U.S. House of Representatives from New York's 19th congressional district 1871–1873	Succeeded by Henry H. Hathorn
