= Joseph Mullin =

American judge

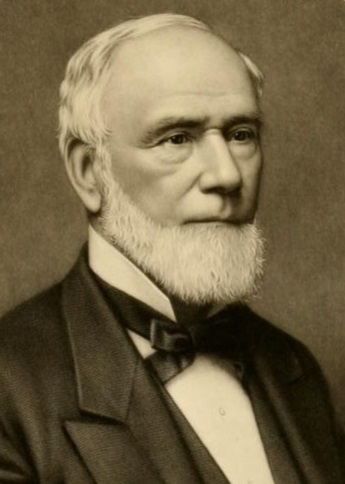

Member of the U.S. House of Representatives from New York's 19th district
- In office March 4, 1847 – March 3, 1849
- Preceded by: Orville Hungerford
- Succeeded by: Charles E. Clarke

Personal details
- Born: August 6, 1811 Dromore, County Down, Ireland, U.K.
- Died: May 17, 1882 (aged 70) Saratoga Springs, New York, U.S.
- Party: Whig; Republican
- Spouse: Lydia Maria Ten Eyck (m. 1837)
- Relations: Egbert Ten Eyck (father-in-law)
- Children: 5, including Joseph Mullin
- Education: Union College

Joseph Mullin (August 6, 1811 – May 17, 1882) was an American lawyer and politician from New York.

== Early life ==
Mullin was born near Dromore, County Down, Ireland on August 6, 1811. He came to the United States in 1820 with his parents, and they settled in Watertown, New York. He attended Union Academy at Belleville, and graduated from Union College in 1833.

== Career ==
Following his graduation from Union College, he taught school and was Principal of Union Academy, and subsequently taught at Watertown Academy. Then he studied law and was admitted to the bar in 1837.

Mullin was District Attorney of Jefferson County from 1843 to 1845. He was elected as a Whig to the 30th United States Congress, holding office from March 4, 1847, to March 3, 1849. He was President of the Village of Watertown in 1853 and 1854.

In 1855, he ran on the Republican ticket for the New York Court of Appeals, but was defeated by the American Party candidate George F. Comstock.

He was a justice of the New York Supreme Court (5th District) from 1858 to 1881, and was ex officio a judge of the Court of Appeals in 1864. He retired from the bench in January 1881.

== Personal life ==
On January 29, 1837, he married Lydia Maria Ten Eyck (1815–1884), a daughter of fellow U.S. Representative Egbert Ten Eyck. Together, they were the parents of five children: Anthony Ten Eyck Mullin, Catherine Mullin, Lydia Mullin, Rebecca Ten Eyck Mullin, and Joseph Mullin (1848–1897), who served in the New York State Senate.

Mullin died on May 17, 1882, in Saratoga Springs, New York. He was buried at the Brookside Cemetery, in Watertown.

== Sources ==
U.S. House of Representatives
Preceded by Orville Hungerford	Member of the U.S. House of Representatives from New York's 19th congressional district 1847–1849	Succeeded by Charles E. Clarke
