= James R. Allaben =

American lawyer and politician

James Rogers Allaben (October 20, 1823 – September 14, 1893) was an American lawyer and politician from New York.

== Life ==
Allaben was born on October 20, 1823, in Roxbury, New York, the son of John Allaben and Fezon McIntyre. State senator Orson M. Allaben and assemblyman Jonathan C. Allaben were his brothers, and assemblyman Buell Maben was his brother-in-law. His childhood neighbor and friend was Jay Gould.

Allaben attended Delaware Academy. He studied law under Judge Wheeler and was admitted to the bar in 1848. In the 1860 United States Presidential Election, he was a presidential elector for Abraham Lincoln and Hannibal Hamlin.

In 1861, Allaben moved to Brooklyn, where he briefly worked in the New York Custom House. He was later made a quarantine commissioner. In 1868, he was elected to the New York State Assembly, representing the Kings County 5th District. He served in the Assembly in 1869. He then served as internal revenue assessor of the second district. He was an active member of the Republican Party.

In 1853, Allaben married Ellen P. Smith of Delhi. Their children were William H., Charles S., Eliza M., and James R., Jr.

Allaben died at his Flatbush home on September 14, 1893. He was buried in Woodland Cemetery in Delhi.

New York State Assembly
Preceded by William C. Jones	New York State Assembly; Kings County, 5th District; 1869	Succeeded by William C. Jones
