= James Geddes (engineer) =

American engineer and politician (1763–1838)

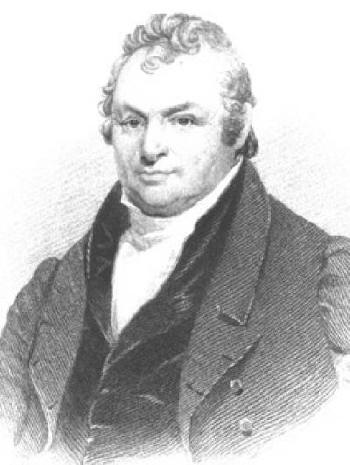
- Born: July 22, 1763; Carlisle, Province of Pennsylvania, British America
- Died: August 19, 1838 (aged 75); Salina, New York, U.S.
- Occupations: Engineer, surveyor, legislator

James Geddes (July 22, 1763 – August 19, 1838) was born in Carlisle in the Province of Pennsylvania and was a prominent engineer, surveyor, New York State legislator and U.S. Congressman who was instrumental in the planning of the Erie Canal and other canals in the United States. He was also at the forefront of development of the salt industry at Onondaga Lake near Syracuse, New York beginning in 1794.

== Biography ==
The son of a Scottish farmer, Geddes eventually settled in 1794 at the head of Onondaga Lake in what was to become Onondaga County, New York, where he investigated the brine springs and set up a salt works at Geddesburgh, now Solvay. He acquired lands from the State of New York which had been formerly owned by the Onondaga tribe and became an adopted member of the Onondagas in resolution of a salt-making dispute, being given the name Don-da-dah-gwah.

Geddes first surveyed and laid out the village of Geddes with approximately twenty lots on either side of West Genesee Street in 1807.

An early supporter of a proposed canal to the Great Lakes, Geddes was appointed by the state Surveyor General to explore possible routes for such a canal. Based in part on Geddes' recommendations, the Legislature established a canal commission in 1810 . Geddes was one of five engineers chosen in 1816 to supervise the construction of the Erie Canal. He also was appointed chief engineer of the Ohio and Erie Canal.

He served as a judge and was elected to the 18th Congress in 1818 as a Federalist. He later became a supporter of the Anti-Masonic Party.

His son, George Geddes, was a New York State legislator. His grandson, also called James Geddes, was a civil engineer and agriculturist.

Geddes died at Salina, New York on August 19, 1838, in the part of it which would later become known as the Town of Geddes, named for him.

U.S. House of Representatives
New district	Member of the U.S. House of Representatives from New York's 19th congressional district 1813–1815	Succeeded by Victory Birdseye
