= Henry H. Ross =

American politician

Henry Howard Ross

Member of the U.S. House of Representatives from New York's 19th district
- In office March 4, 1825 – March 3, 1827
- Preceded by: John Richards
- Succeeded by: Richard Keese

Personal details
- Born: May 9, 1790 Essex, New York, U.S.
- Died: September 14, 1862 (aged 72)
- Resting place: Hickory Hill, Essex, New York, U.S.
- Party: Whig
- Education: Columbia College

Henry Howard Ross (May 9, 1790 – September 14, 1862) was an American lawyer and politician from New York.

== Life ==
He was born on May 9, 1790, in Essex, New York, then a town in Clinton County which became part of Essex County, New York in 1799. He was the son of Daniel Ross, who was Sheriff of Clinton County from 1794 to 1797, assemblyman in 1798, and First Judge of Essex County from 1800 to 1823, and Elizabeth (Gilliland) Ross.

Ross attended the common schools, and also was educated by his father and a private tutor. He graduated from Columbia College in 1808. He then studied law with Ralph Hascall in Essex, but returned in 1809 to New York City and continued his legal studies there with David B. Ogden. Ross was admitted to the bar in 1811, and practiced in Essex throughout his life.

During the War of 1812, he enlisted as a second lieutenant in the 37th Infantry Regiment of the New York State Militia, and fought in the Battle of Plattsburgh. He rose through the ranks, becoming a major general of the State Militia in 1828, and retired from the militia in 1836.

On September 23, 1822, he married Susannah Blanchard (d. 1877, daughter of Anthony I. Blanchard who was a member of the New York State Assembly in 1796-97), and they had several children.

Ross was elected as an Adams man to the 19th United States Congress, holding office from March 4, 1825, to March 3, 1827. Afterwards he resumed the practice of law in Essex.

He was First Judge and Surrogate of the Essex County Court from 1847 to 1848. He was a presidential elector on the Whig ticket in 1848 voting for Zachary Taylor and Millard Fillmore.

Ross was buried in a vault on his family estate, "Hickory Hill," in Essex.

== Sources ==
- United States Congress. "Henry H. Ross (id: R000447)". Biographical Directory of the United States Congress.
- The New York Civil List compiled by Franklin Benjamin Hough (pages 71, 89, 323, 330 and 360; Weed, Parsons and Co., 1858)
- HONORABLE HENRY H. ROSS bio in Northern Lancet and Gazette of Legal Medicine edited by Francis J. D'Avignon and Horace Nelson (Vol. 1, 1850; pages 87ff)
- Ross genealogy in History of Essex County edited by H. P. Smith (D. Mason & Co., Syracuse, NY, 1885), at Ray's Place

U.S. House of Representatives
Preceded by John Richards	Member of the U.S. House of Representatives from New York's 19th congressional district March 4, 1825 – March 3, 1827	Succeeded by Richard Keese
