= Caleb F. Buckley =

American politician

Caleb F. Buckley (November 16, 1841 – October 2, 1879) was an American politician from New York.

== Life ==
Buckley was born on November 16, 1841, in New York City, New York. His father was a veteran from the War of 1812, a well-known Democratic politician in his ward, and the founder of the Ironsides Club. The family moved to Brooklyn in 1848.

Buckley initially worked as a clerk. He later was involved in the real estate business.

In 1866, Buckley was elected to the New York State Assembly as a Democrat, representing the Kings County 5th District. He served in the Assembly in 1867.

Buckley died at home on October 2, 1879. He had a wife and three children. He was buried in the Evergreens Cemetery.

New York State Assembly
| Preceded by William W. Goodrich | New York State Assembly; Kings County, 5th District; 1867 | Succeeded by William C. Jones |
