= John Richards (New York politician) =

American politician

John Richards (April 13, 1765 – April 18, 1850) was an American politician from New York.

== Life ==
Richards was born in Llanuwchllyn, Gwynedd, Wales, where he became a schoolmaster. He emigrated to the United States and settled in Johnsburg where he again taught school. Richards served as Warren County's judge of the court of common pleas from 1805 to 1850. He was town supervisor of Johnsburg, first in 1807 and then for several more terms.

He was a member from Washington County of the New York State Assembly in 1811, and from Washington and Warren counties in 1814 and 1814-15. In 1817, he removed to Lake George. Richards was a delegate to the New York State Constitutional Convention of 1821.

Richards was elected as a Crawford Democratic-Republican to the 18th United States Congress, holding office from March 4, 1823, to March 3, 1825.

He died on April 18, 1850, in Lake George, Warren County, New York, and was buried at the John Richards Cemetery.

== Sources ==
- United States Congress. "John Richards (id: R000216)". Biographical Directory of the United States Congress.
- The New York Civil List compiled by Franklin Benjamin Hough (pages 58, 71, 185, 189f and 299; Weed, Parsons and Co., 1858)

U.S. House of Representatives
Preceded by Elisha Litchfield	Member of the U.S. House of Representatives from New York's 19th congressional district 1823–1825	Succeeded by Henry H. Ross
