= Richard Keese =

American politician (1794–1883)

Member of the U.S. House of Representatives from New York's 19th district
- In office March 4, 1827 – March 3, 1829
- Preceded by: Henry H. Ross
- Succeeded by: Isaac Finch

Personal details
- Born: November 23, 1794 Peru, New York, U.S.
- Died: February 7, 1883 (aged 88) Keeseville, New York, U.S.
- Resting place: Evergreen Cemetery
- Party: Jacksonian
- Profession: Politician, jurist

Richard Keese (November 23, 1794 – February 7, 1883) was an American jurist and politician who served one term as a U.S. representative from New York from 1827 to 1829.

== Biography ==
Born in Peru (now AuSable) Town, Clinton County, New York, Keese attended the common schools and Keeseville Academy. He engaged in agricultural pursuits.

=== Congress ===
Keese was elected as a Jacksonian to the Twentieth Congress (March 4, 1827 – March 3, 1829).

=== Later career and death ===
He engaged in auctioneering.

He served as judge of the Clinton County court of common pleas in 1835 and 1836.

He died in Keeseville, New York, on February 7, 1883. He was interred in Evergreen Cemetery.

== Sources ==
- United States Congress. "Richard Keese (id: K000043)". Biographical Directory of the United States Congress.

U.S. House of Representatives
Preceded by Henry H. Ross	Member of the U.S. House of Representatives from New York's 19th congressional district 1827–1829	Succeeded by Isaac Finch
