= James G. Thompson (New York politician) =

American politician (1829–1892)

James G. Thompson (January 15, 1829 – April 14, 1892) was an American politician from New York.

== Early life ==
Thompson was born on January 15, 1829, in Sharon, Schoharie County, New York, to Dr. Thompson and his wife. His maternal grandfather was Peter B. Guernsey. He graduated from Rensselaer Polytechnic Institute.

== Career ==
Following graduation, Thompson taught school. Later he engaged in the book and stationery business in Norwich.

He was treasurer of Chenango County from 1855 to 1857. He was clerk of Chenango County from 1858 to 1872. He also served as school superintendent and supervisor of Norwich.

In 1873, the Republican nomination for state senator from the 23rd District (comprising Schoharie, Delaware and Chenango counties) was disputed by one candidate from each of the three counties, and Thompson was nominated on the 143rd ballot. He was elected by a majority of a single vote, and was a member of the New York State Senate (23rd D.) in 1874 and 1875. His election was unsuccessfully contested by his Democratic opponent William Yeomans Jr. He was chairman of the internal affairs of towns and counties committee and the poor laws committee. He was a member of the militia and literature committees.

== Personal life ==
In 1857, Thompson married Julia Frances Foote, daughter of Lyman Foote. They had three sons. He lived in Norwich up until 1890. He then lived on Clair Street in Chicago.

Thompson died on April 14, 1892, in Chicago.

New York State Senate
Preceded by James H. Graham	New York State Senate; 23rd District; 1874–1875	Succeeded by ?
