= George Hall (New York politician) =

American politician

George Hall (May 12, 1770 – March 20, 1840) was a United States representative from New York.

Hall was born in Cheshire, Connecticut, on May 12, 1770, he attended the common schools, studied law, was admitted to the bar and practiced in Onondaga County, New York. He moved to Onondaga, New York, in 1802 and continued the practice of law; he was postmaster of Onondaga Hollow in 1802, and was surrogate of Onondaga County from 1800 to 1822. He was supervisor in 1811 and 1812, and justice of the peace from 1818 to 1822.

Hall was a member of the New York State Assembly in 1816 and 1817, and was elected as a Democratic-Republican to the 16th United States Congress, holding office from March 4, 1819, to March 3, 1821. He was an unsuccessful candidate in 1820 to the 17th United States Congress, and resumed the practice of law. He died in Onondaga Valley on March 20, 1840, and is interred in Onondaga Valley Cemetery.

U.S. House of Representatives
Preceded by James Porter	Member of the U.S. House of Representatives from New York's 19th congressional district 1819–1821	Succeeded by Elisha Litchfield
