= Charles Knapp (congressman) =

American politician

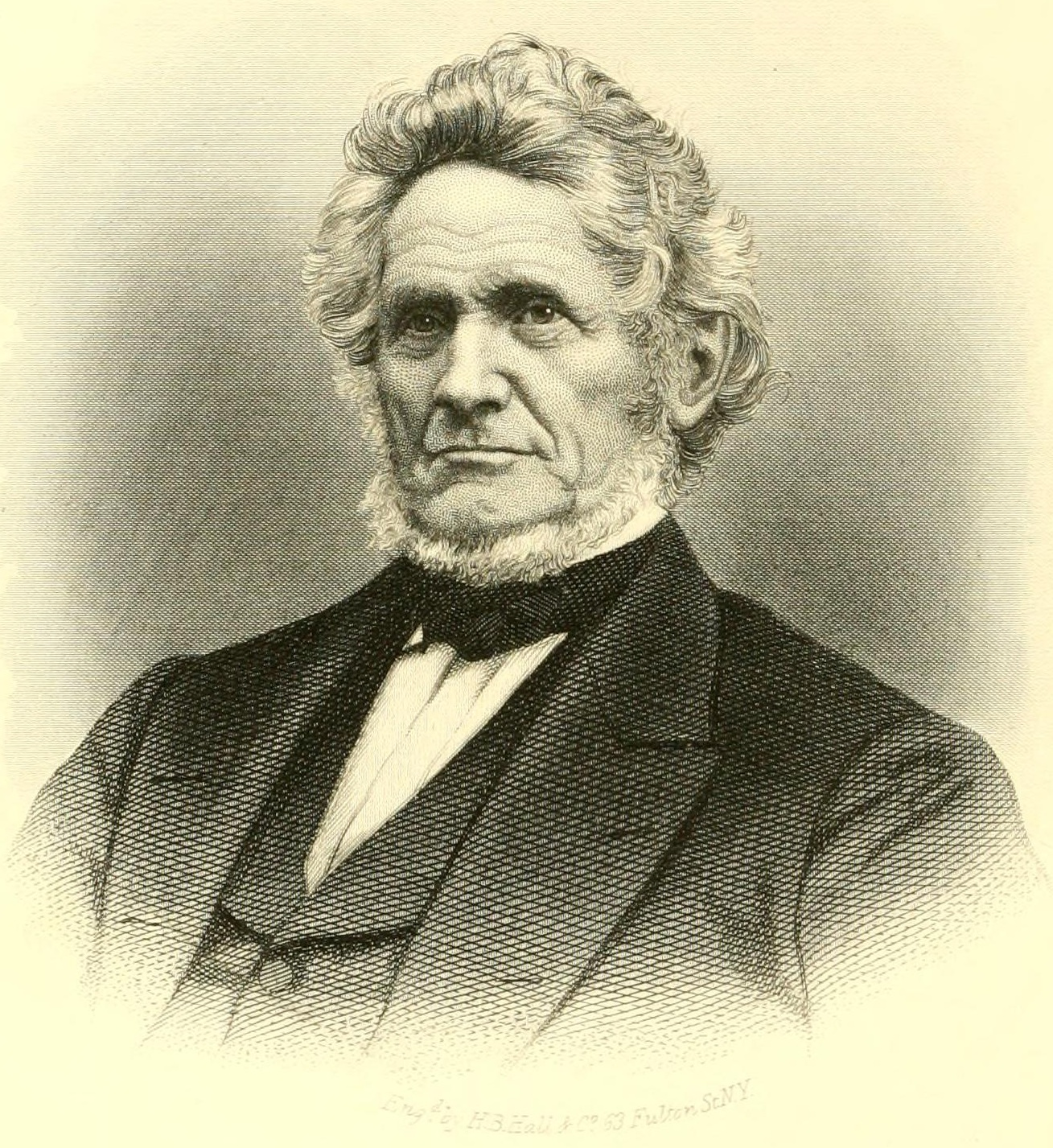

Member of the U.S. House of Representatives from New York's 19th district
- In office March 4, 1869 – March 3, 1871
- Preceded by: William C. Fields
- Succeeded by: Elizur H. Prindle

Personal details
- Born: October 8, 1797 Colchester, New York, U.S.
- Died: May 14, 1880 (aged 82) Deposit, New York, U.S.
- Resting place: Laurel Hill Cemetery
- Party: Republican
- Other political affiliations: Democratic (until mid-1850s)
- Children: Charles J. Knapp

Charles Knapp (October 8, 1797 – May 14, 1880) was a U.S. representative from New York. He was the father of Charles J. Knapp, who also served in Congress.

Born in Colchester, New York, Charles Knapp was educated at home and later attended the common schools. He farmed and worked as a school teacher before starting a career as a merchant in 1825. Knapp was later active in several other ventures, including a lumber mill and a tannery.

Knapp was elected Colchester's Town Supervisor and a member of the Delaware County Board of Supervisors in 1830, 1835 and 1836. Originally a Democrat affiliated with the Martin Van Buren organization, Knapp served in the New York State Assembly (Delaware Co.) in 1841.

He moved to Deposit, New York, in 1848. In 1854 he organized a privately owned bank, the Knapp Bank, of which he served as president. He changed his political affiliation to the Republican Party when the party was organized in the mid-1850s.

Knapp was elected as a Republican to the 41st United States Congress, (March 4, 1869 – March 3, 1871), representing New York's 19th congressional district.

He was not a candidate for renomination in 1870 and resumed his banking and business interests.

Knapp died in Deposit on May 14, 1880.

== Sources ==
- United States Congress. "Charles Knapp (id: K000277)". Biographical Directory of the United States Congress.

U.S. House of Representatives
Preceded by William C. Fields	Member of the U.S. House of Representatives from New York's 19th congressional district 1869–1871	Succeeded by Elizur H. Prindle
