= Willard Ives =

American politician

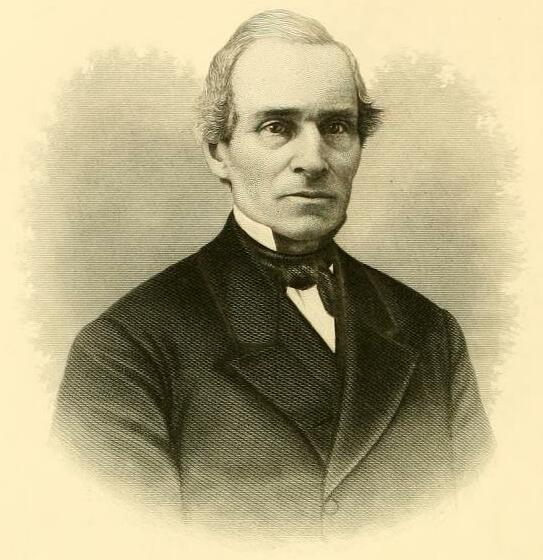

Member of the U.S. House of Representatives from New York's 19th district
- In office March 4, 1851 – March 3, 1853
- Preceded by: Charles E. Clarke
- Succeeded by: George W. Chase

Personal details
- Born: Willard Ives; July 7, 1806 Watertown, New York
- Died: April 19, 1896 (aged 89) Watertown, New York
- Resting place: Brookside Cemetery
- Party: Democratic Party (United States)

Willard Ives (July 7, 1806 – April 19, 1896) was an American politician who served one term as a U.S. representative from New York from 1851 to 1853.

== Biography ==
Born in Watertown, New York, Ives attended the common schools, also Belleville (New York) Academy, and Lowville (New York) Academy. He engaged in agricultural pursuits and was also interested in banking.

He served as a delegate to the world convention of Methodists held in London, England, in 1846.

=== Congress ===
He was an unsuccessful candidate for election to the Thirtieth Congress in 1848, but was elected as a Democrat to the Thirty-second Congress (March 4, 1851 – March 3, 1853).

=== Later career ===
He served as president of Ives Seminary, Antwerp, New York, which he endowed. He was one of the originators and organizers of Syracuse University and served on the board of trustees in 1870–1886. He resumed agricultural pursuits.

=== Death ===
He died in Watertown, New York, April 19, 1896. He was interred in Brookside Cemetery.

Ives Seminary is named for him.

(**Note Biographical Directory erroneously lists Willard Ives as having served in the New York Assembly in 1829–30, when it was, in fact, Ives' father, Dr. Titus Ives (d. 1847), who served)

== Sources ==
- United States Congress. "Willard Ives (id: I000051)". Biographical Directory of the United States Congress.

U.S. House of Representatives
Preceded by Charles E. Clarke	Member of the U.S. House of Representatives from New York's 19th congressional district 1851–1853	Succeeded by George W. Chase
