= Henry H. Hathorn =

American politician

Harry H. Hawthorn
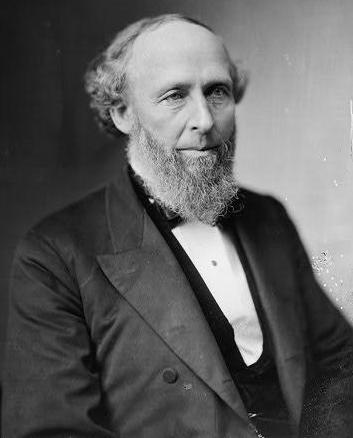

Member of the U.S. House of Representatives New York
- In office March 4, 1873 – March 4, 1877
- Preceded by: Elizur H. Prindle
- Succeeded by: John H. Starin
- Constituency: 19th district (1873–75); 20th district (1875–77)

Personal details
- Born: Henry Harrison Hathorn; November 28, 1813 Greenfield, New York, U.S.
- Died: February 20, 1887 (aged 73) Saratoga Springs, New York, U.S.
- Resting place: Greenridge Cemetery
- Party: Republican

Henry Harrison Hathorn (November 28, 1813 – February 20, 1887) was a 19th-century American businessman and politician who served two terms as a Republican U.S. representative from New York from 1873 to 1877.

== Personal ==
Born in Greenfield, New York, Hathorn attended the common schools and graduated from the public schools of Greenfield.

== Business career ==
Hathorn engaged in mercantile pursuits in Saratoga Springs from 1839 to 1849. He discovered and plumbed the "Hathorn Mineral Spring" and was the proprietor of Union Hotel in Saratoga Springs. In 1854 he purchased "Congress Hall" and expanded it, adding another story and a ballroom.

== Political career ==
Hathorn served as Sheriff of Saratoga County from 1853 to 1856 and from 1862 to 1865. He was Town Supervisor of Saratoga Springs in 1858, 1860, 1866, and 1867.

=== Congress ===
Hathorn was elected as a Republican to the Forty-third and Forty-fourth Congresses (March 4, 1873 – March 3, 1877).

== Death and burial ==
He died at Saratoga Springs, New York on February 20, 1887, and was interred in Greenridge Cemetery.

U.S. House of Representatives
Preceded by Elizur H. Prindle	Member of the U.S. House of Representatives from New York's 19th congressional district 1873–1875	Succeeded by William A. Wheeler
Preceded by David Wilber	Member of the U.S. House of Representatives from New York's 20th congressional district 1875–1877	Succeeded by John H. Starin
