= Jonas A. Hughston =

American politician (1808–1862)

Member of the U.S. House of Representatives from New York's 19th district
- In office March 4, 1855 – March 3, 1857
- Preceded by: George W. Chase
- Succeeded by: Oliver A. Morse

Personal details
- Born: Jonas Abbott Hughston; 1808 Sidney, New York, U.S.
- Died: November 10, 1862 (aged 53–54) Shanghai, China
- Resting place: Poo-ting Cemetery
- Party: Whig
- Profession: Politician, lawyer

Jonas Abbott Hughston (1808 – November 10, 1862) was a U.S. representative from New York.

Born in Sidney, New York, Hughston completed preparatory studies. He studied law. He was admitted to the bar in 1839 and commenced practice at Delhi, New York. He served as district attorney of Delaware County 1842–1845. He resumed the practice of law.

Hughston was elected as an Whig candidate to the Thirty-fourth Congress (March 4, 1855 – March 3, 1857). He was appointed by President Lincoln marshal of the consular court at Shanghai, China, on March 26, 1862, and served until his death in Shanghai, China, on November 10, 1862. He was interred in Poo-ting Cemetery.

== Sources ==
- United States Congress. "Jonas A. Hughston (id: H000931)". Biographical Directory of the United States Congress.

U.S. House of Representatives
Preceded by George W. Chase	Member of the U.S. House of Representatives from New York's 19th congressional district March 4, 1855 – March 3, 1857	Succeeded by Oliver A. Morse
