= James H. Graham =

American politician

James Harper Graham
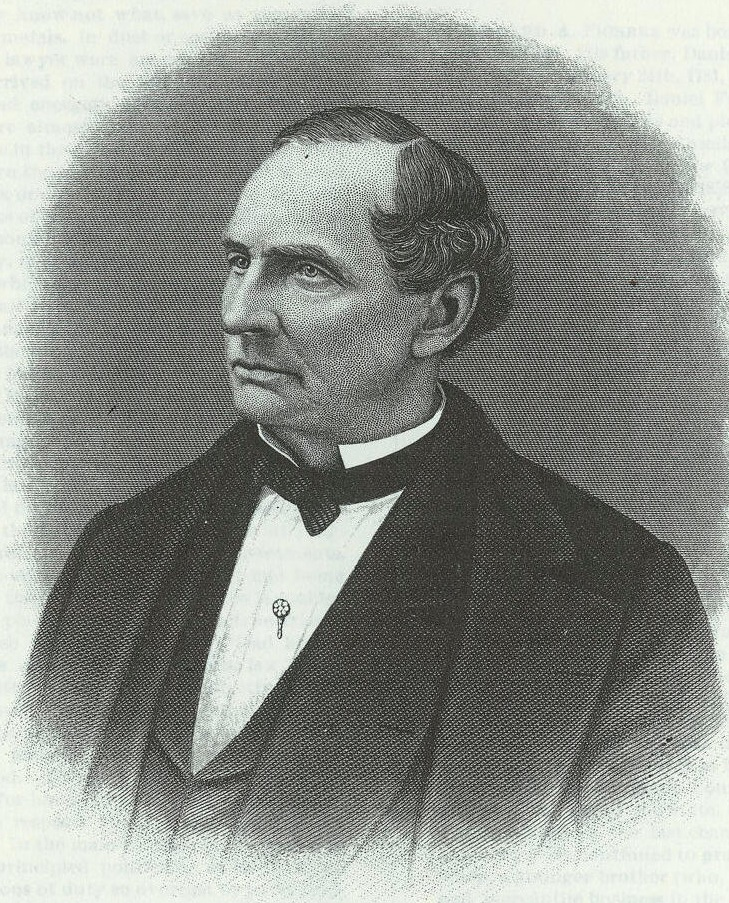
- James H. Graham, Congressman from New York

Member of the U.S. House of Representatives from New York's 19th district
- In office March 4, 1859 – March 3, 1861
- Preceded by: Oliver A. Morse
- Succeeded by: Richard Franchot

Member of the New York House of Representatives from the 2nd district
- In office 1871–1871
- Preceded by: Orson M. Allaben
- Succeeded by: Matthew Griffin

Member of the New York Senate from the 23rd district
- In office 1872–1873
- Preceded by: John F. Hubbard Jr.
- Succeeded by: James G. Thompson

Personal details
- Born: September 18, 1812 Bovina, New York
- Died: June 23, 1881 (aged 68) Delhi, New York
- Party: Republican

James Harper Graham (September 18, 1812 – June 23, 1881) was an American politician from New York.

== Life ==
Born in Bovina, New York, Graham attended the public schools and then engaged in agricultural pursuits. He was Town Supervisor of Delhi and Chairman of the Delaware County Board of Supervisors.

Graham was elected as a Republican to the 36th United States Congress, holding office from March 4, 1859, to March 3, 1861.

He was a member of the New York State Assembly (Delaware Co., 2nd D.) in 1871; and of the New York State Senate (23rd D.) in 1872 and 1873.

Afterwards, he engaged in agricultural and mercantile pursuits. He died in Delhi on June 23, 1881, and was buried at the Woodland Cemetery.

U.S. House of Representatives
Preceded by Oliver A. Morse	Member of the U.S. House of Representatives from New York's 19th congressional district 1859–1861	Succeeded by Richard Franchot
New York State Assembly
Preceded by Orson M. Allaben	New York State Assembly; Delaware County, 2nd District; 1871	Succeeded by Matthew Griffin
New York State Senate
Preceded by John F. Hubbard Jr.	New York State Senate; 23rd District; 1872–1873	Succeeded by James G. Thompson
