= Orson M. Allaben =

American physician and politician (1808–1891)

Orson MacIntire Allaben (August 5, 1808 in Delhi, Delaware County, New York – November 27, 1891 in Margaretville, Delaware Co., NY) was an American physician and politician from New York.

== Life ==
He was the son of John Allaben (1785–1845) and Fezon (MacIntire) Allaben (1788–1867). The family removed to a farm in Roxbury, when he was still an infant. In December 1827, he began to study medicine with Dr. J. B. Cowles at Roxbury, graduated in 1831, and practiced medicine in Middletown. On October 17, 1832, he married Thankful Dimmick (born 1811). He was Supervisor of the Town of Middletown for seven terms; and was Chairman of the Board of Supervisors in 1863.

He was a member of the New York State Assembly (Delaware Co.) in 1840; Postmaster of Margaretville; and a director of the Rondout and Oswego Railroad.

He was a member of the New York State Senate (14th D.) in 1864 and 1865; and again of the State Assembly in 1870.

He was buried at the Woodland Cemetery in Delhi.

Assemblymen Jonathan C. Allaben (1813–1889) and James R. Allaben (1823–1893) were his brothers; Assemblyman Buel Maben (1815–1886) was his brother in law.

The hamlet of Allaben, in the Town of Shandaken, Ulster County, New York, was named after Orson M. Allaben.

== Sources ==
- The New York Civil List compiled by Franklin Benjamin Hough, Stephen C. Hutchins and Edgar Albert Werner (1870; pg. 443, 493 and 495)
- Life Sketches of Executive Officers, and Members of the Legislature of the State of New York, Vol. III by H. H. Boone & Theodore P. Cook (1870; pg. 157ff)
- Tremayne's Table of the Post-Offices in the United States (1850; pg. 112)
- Allaben family at Political Graveyard

New York State Senate
Preceded by Joseph H. Ramsey	New York State Senate; 14th District; 1864–1865	Succeeded by Charles Stanford
New York State Assembly
Preceded by John Ferris	New York State Assembly; Delaware County, 2nd District; 1870	Succeeded by James H. Graham
