= William C. Fields =

American politician

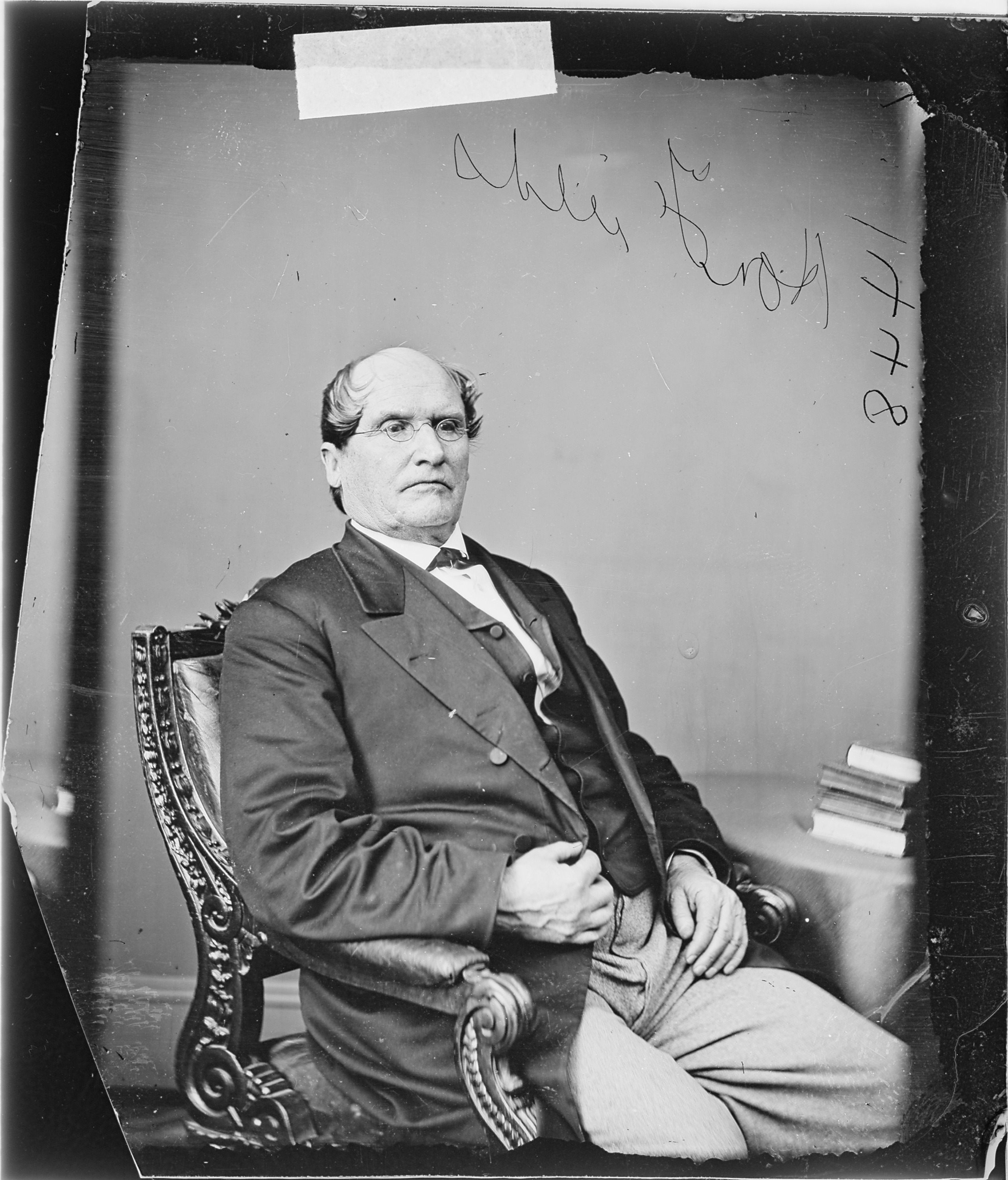

Member of the U.S. House of Representatives from New York's 19th district
- In office March 4, 1867 – March 4, 1869

William Craig Fields (February 13, 1804 – October 27, 1882) was a U.S. representative from New York.

Born in New York City, Fields attended the common schools. He moved to Laurens, New York, in 1836 and engaged in mercantile pursuits and in 1847 engaged in the manufacture of cotton and linen goods. He was the Justice of the Peace for sixteen years. He was clerk of Otsego County from 1852 to 1855, and Supervisor of Otsego County in 1865 and 1866.

Fields was elected as a Republican to the Fortieth Congress (March 4, 1867 – March 3, 1869). After retiring from public life, he died in Laurens, New York on October 27, 1882 and was interred in Laurens Cemetery.

U.S. House of Representatives
Preceded by Demas Hubbard, Jr.	Member of the U.S. House of Representatives from New York's 19th congressional district March 4, 1867 – March 4, 1869	Succeeded by Charles Knapp
