= Charles E. Clarke =

American politician

Member of the House of Representatives from New York's 19th District
- In office March 4, 1849 – March 3, 1851
- Preceded by: Joseph Mullin
- Succeeded by: Willard Ives

Member of the New York State Assembly
- In office 1839–1840

Personal details
- Born: April 8, 1790 Saybrook, Connecticut, US
- Died: December 29, 1863 (aged 73) Great Bend, New York, US
- Party: Whig
- Education: Yale College
- Occupation: lawyer

Charles Ezra Clarke (April 8, 1790 – December 29, 1863) was a U.S. representative from New York.

== Biography ==
Clarke was born in Saybrook, Connecticut on April 8, 1790. He completed preparatory studies and graduated from Yale College in 1809.

He studied law in Greene County, New York, was admitted to the bar in 1815, and commenced practice in Watertown, New York.

He moved to Great Bend, New York in 1840, where he owned and operated a gristmill, sawmill and distillery, and engaged in agricultural pursuits. He was also elected president of the Jefferson County Agricultural Society. He also became active in railroad development and management, including a post on the board of directors of the Carthage, Watertown and Sackets Harbor Railroad and one on the board of the Sackets Harbor and Saratoga Railroad.

A Whig, he served as a member of the New York State Assembly in 1839 and 1840. Clarke was elected as a Whig to the Thirty-first Congress (March 4, 1849 – March 3, 1851). After leaving Congress he resumed the practice of law and returned to his business interests.

He died in Great Bend on December 29, 1863. He was interred at Brookside Cemetery, Watertown, New York.

U.S. House of Representatives
Preceded by Joseph Mullin	Member of the U.S. House of Representatives from New York's 19th congressional district March 4, 1849 – March 3, 1851	Succeeded by Willard Ives
