= Isaac Finch =

American politician (1783–1845)

Member of the U.S. House of Representatives from New York's 19th district
- In office March 4, 1829 – March 3, 1831
- Preceded by: Richard Keese
- Succeeded by: William Hogan

Personal details
- Born: October 13, 1783 Stillwater, New York, U.S.
- Died: June 23, 1845 (aged 61) Jay, New York, U.S.
- Resting place: Central Cemetery
- Party: Anti-Jacksonian
- Profession: Politician

Military service
- Allegiance: United States
- Rank: Major
- Battles/wars: War of 1812

Isaac Finch (October 13, 1783 – June 23, 1845) was a U.S. representative from New York.

Born in Stillwater, New York, Finch moved with his parents to Peru, New York, in 1787. He attended the public schools. He studied law, but did not engage in extensive practice. He settled near Jay, New York, and became interested in agricultural pursuits. He served as major in the Twenty-sixth Regiment of Infantry during the War of 1812. He was a member of the New York State Assembly (Essex Co.) in 1822 and 1824.

Finch was elected as an Anti-Jacksonian to the 21st United States Congress, holding office from March 4, 1829, to March 3, 1831. Afterwards he resumed his agricultural pursuits. He died in Jay, New York, on June 23, 1845. He was interred in Central Cemetery.

U.S. House of Representatives
Preceded by Richard Keese	Member of the U.S. House of Representatives from New York's 19th congressional district March 4, 1829 – March 3, 1831	Succeeded by William Hogan
