= George W. Chase =

American politician

Member of the House of Representatives from New York's 19th District
- In office March 4, 1853 – March 3, 1855
- Preceded by: Willard Ives
- Succeeded by: Jonas A. Hughston

Personal details
- Born: 1810 Maryland, New York, US
- Died: April 17, 1867 (aged 56–57) Maryland, New York, US
- Party: Whig

George William Chase (1810 – April 17, 1867) was a U.S. Representative from New York.

Born in the town of Maryland, New York, Chase attended the common schools. He became a farmer, miller, leather manufacturer, and merchant in Schenevus, New York. He was also active in other business ventures, including serving on the board of directors of the Albany and Susquehanna Railroad. From 1842 to 1843 he served as Maryland's Town Supervisor. In addition, at different times he also served as postmaster of both Maryland and Schenevus.

Chase was elected as a Whig to the Thirty-third Congress (March 4, 1853 – March 3, 1855). After leaving Congress he resumed his former agricultural and business pursuits, including serving on the board of directors of the Second National Bank of Cooperstown.

He died in Chaseville, Maryland Township, New York on April 17, 1867, and was interred in the Chase vault in Schenevus Cemetery.

U.S. House of Representatives
Preceded by Willard Ives	Member of the U.S. House of Representatives from New York's 19th congressional district March 4, 1853 – March 3, 1855	Succeeded by Jonas A. Hughston
