= James Porter (New York politician) =

American politician

Member of the U.S. House of Representatives from New York's 19th district
- In office March 4, 1817 – March 3, 1819
- Preceded by: Victory Birdseye
- Succeeded by: George Hall

Personal details
- Born: April 18, 1787 Williamstown, Massachusetts, US
- Died: February 7, 1839 (aged 51) Albany, New York, US
- Party: Democratic-Republican
- Education: Williams College
- Occupation: Lawyer

James Porter (April 18, 1787 – February 7, 1839) was a United States representative from New York. He was born in Williamstown, Massachusetts on April 18, 1787. He graduated from Williams College in 1810, studied law, was admitted to the bar, and commenced practice in Skaneateles, New York.

Porter was a member of the New York State Assembly and was elected as a Democratic-Republican to the Fifteenth Congress (March 4, 1817 – March 3, 1819). He was not a candidate for renomination and resumed the practice of law. He served as a surrogate of Onondaga County, then moved to Albany and served as a register of the court of chancery until his death there on February 7, 1839. His interment was in Greenwood Cemetery in Brooklyn, New York.

U.S. House of Representatives
Preceded by Victory Birdseye	Member of the U.S. House of Representatives from New York's 19th congressional district 1817–1819	Succeeded by George Hall
