= William C. Jones (New York politician) =

American politician (1822–1877)

William C. Jones (October 19, 1822 – June 22, 1877) was an American politician from New York.

== Life ==
Jones was born on October 19, 1822, in New York City, the son of John Jones, a veteran of the War of 1812 and a close friend of Mayor Westervelt, and Sarah Tripp.

Jones attended the Chrestomatic Institute under Patrick S. Casserly. After finishing school, he worked as a store clerk for four years, followed by five years in the granite business. During this time, he moved to Brooklyn. With the help of George Taylor, he became employed by the Navy Department and worked as Superintendent of the Erection of Marine Barracks. He also worked as a boss stone-cutter for the Brooklyn Navy Yard.

In 1859, Jones was elected to the New York State Assembly as a Democrat, representing the Kings County 5th District. He served in the Assembly in 1860, 1868, and 1870.

During the American Civil War, Jones served in the South Atlantic Blockading Squadron on the staff of Fleet Engineer Robert Danby. After the War, he became a lessee of the Government docks in Brooklyn. He also held several positions under the city government.

In 1830, Jones married Susan J. Green. She died in around 1859. She was a member of the Methodist Episcopal Church and was an active member of the Freemasons.

Jones died at home on June 22, 1877.

New York State Assembly
Preceded by Lucius C. Andrus	New York State Assembly; Kings County, 5th District; 1860	Succeeded by Lucius C. Andrus
Preceded by Caleb F. Buckley	New York State Assembly; Kings County, 5th District; 1868	Succeeded by James R. Allaben
Preceded by James R. Allaben	New York State Assembly; Kings County, 5th District; 1870	Succeeded by William W. Goodrich
