= Oliver A. Morse =

American politician (1815–1870)

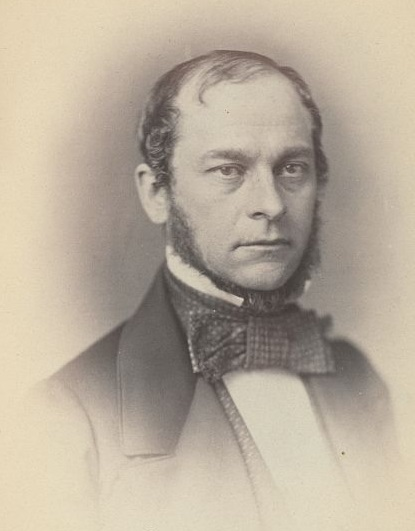

35th United States Congress New York's 19th congressional district
- In office March 4, 1857 – March 3, 1859
- Preceded by: Jonas A. Hughston
- Succeeded by: James H. Graham

Personal details
- Born: Oliver Andrew Morse; March 26, 1815 Cherry Valley, New York, US
- Died: April 20, 1870 (aged 55) New York City, New York, US
- Education: Hamilton College
- Occupation: Attorney

Oliver Andrew Morse (March 26, 1815 – April 20, 1870) was an American politician and attorney. He served in the U.S. House of Representatives from New York. He was also a founding member of Alpha Delta Phi fraternity.

== Early life ==
Morse was born in Cherry Valley, New York, on March 26, 1815. His parents were Mary G. and James O. Morse, an attorney and judge. His uncle was Wiliam M. Oliver, a congressman for the state of New York and acting lieutenant governor of New York.

Morse attended Hamilton College in Clinton, New York, graduating in 1833. While at Hamilton, he was a founding member of the Alpha Delta Phi Literary Society in 1832. He then studied law.

== Career ==
Morse was admitted to the bar and practiced law in Perryville, Ohio. After a short time, he returned to Cherry Valley and practiced law there.

He was elected as a Republican to the 35th United States Congress and served from March 4, 1857, to March 3, 1859. He was opposed to slavery. He did not seek re-election in 1858.

Morse invested in several real estate ventures in Ohio, Michigan, and Wisconsin. However, he claimed to have been swindled of $3,000 by his partner and New York attorney Samuel Campbell.

== Personal life ==
Morse married Anna Clark of Cherry Valley in 1839. They had two daughters, Anna and Sarah.

Morse died in New York City on April 20, 1870. He was buried in Cherry Valley Cemetery in Cherry Valley.

U.S. House of Representatives
| Preceded by Jonas A. Hughston | Member of the U.S. House of Representatives from New York's 19th congressional district March 4, 1857 – March 3, 1859 | Succeeded by James H. Graham |
