= New York's 19th congressional district =

U.S. House district for New York

Coordinates: 42°13′40″N 74°25′32″W

- Interactive map of district boundaries since January 3, 2025
- Representative: Josh Riley; D–Ithaca
- Distribution: 36.51% urban
- Population (2025): 776,772
- Median household income: $74,419
- Ethnicity: 79.9% White; 6.8% Hispanic; 4.8% Two or more races; 4.3% Black; 3.5% Asian; 0.7% other
- Cook PVI: D+1

New York's 19th congressional district is a congressional district for the United States House of Representatives located in New York’s Catskills, Hudson Valley, greater Capital District, Southern Tier, and Finger Lakes regions. It lies partially in the northernmost region of the New York metropolitan area and mostly south of Albany. This district is represented by Democrat Josh Riley.

Various New York districts have been numbered "19" over the years, including areas in New York City and various parts of upstate New York. The 19th district was a Manhattan-based district until 1980. It then was the Bronx-Westchester seat now numbered the 16th district. The present 19th district was the 21st district before the 1990s, and before that was the 25th district.

The 2020 redistricting saw the district expand to include the entirety of Broome, Tioga, Tompkins, Chenango, Delaware, Greene, Sullivan, and Columbia Counties, while partially including Ulster and Otsego Counties.

== Recent election results from statewide races ==
Year	Office	Results
2008	President	Obama 54% - 44%
2012	President	Obama 55% - 45%
2016	President	Trump 48% - 46%
2016	Senate	Schumer 61% - 36%
2018	Senate	Gillibrand 58% - 42%
2018	Governor	Molinaro 50% - 44%
2018	Attorney General	James 51% - 46%
2020	President	Biden 51% - 47%
2022	Senate	Schumer 50% - 49%
2022	Governor	Zeldin 53% - 46%
2022	Attorney General	Henry 52% - 48%
2022	Comptroller	DiNapoli 52% - 48%
2024	President	Harris 50% - 49%
2024	Senate	Gillibrand 54% - 45%

== History ==
1873–1875
Montgomery
1913–1983
Parts of Manhattan
1983–1993
Parts of Bronx, Westchester
1993–2003
- All of Putnam
- Parts of Dutchess, Orange, Westchester

=== 2003–2013 ===
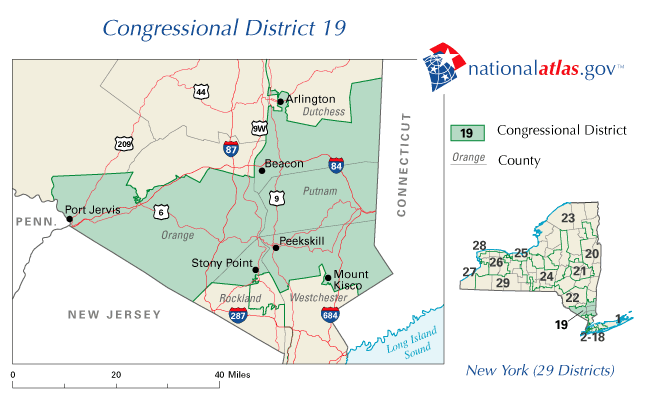
The district from 2003 to 2013

- All of Putnam
- Parts of Dutchess, Orange, Rockland, Westchester

From 2003 to 2013, the 19th was composed of parts of Dutchess, Orange, Rockland, and Westchester Counties, in addition to the entirety of Putnam County. Much of this district is now the 18th district, while the current 19th is essentially a merger of the former 20th district and 22nd district.

=== 2013–2023 ===
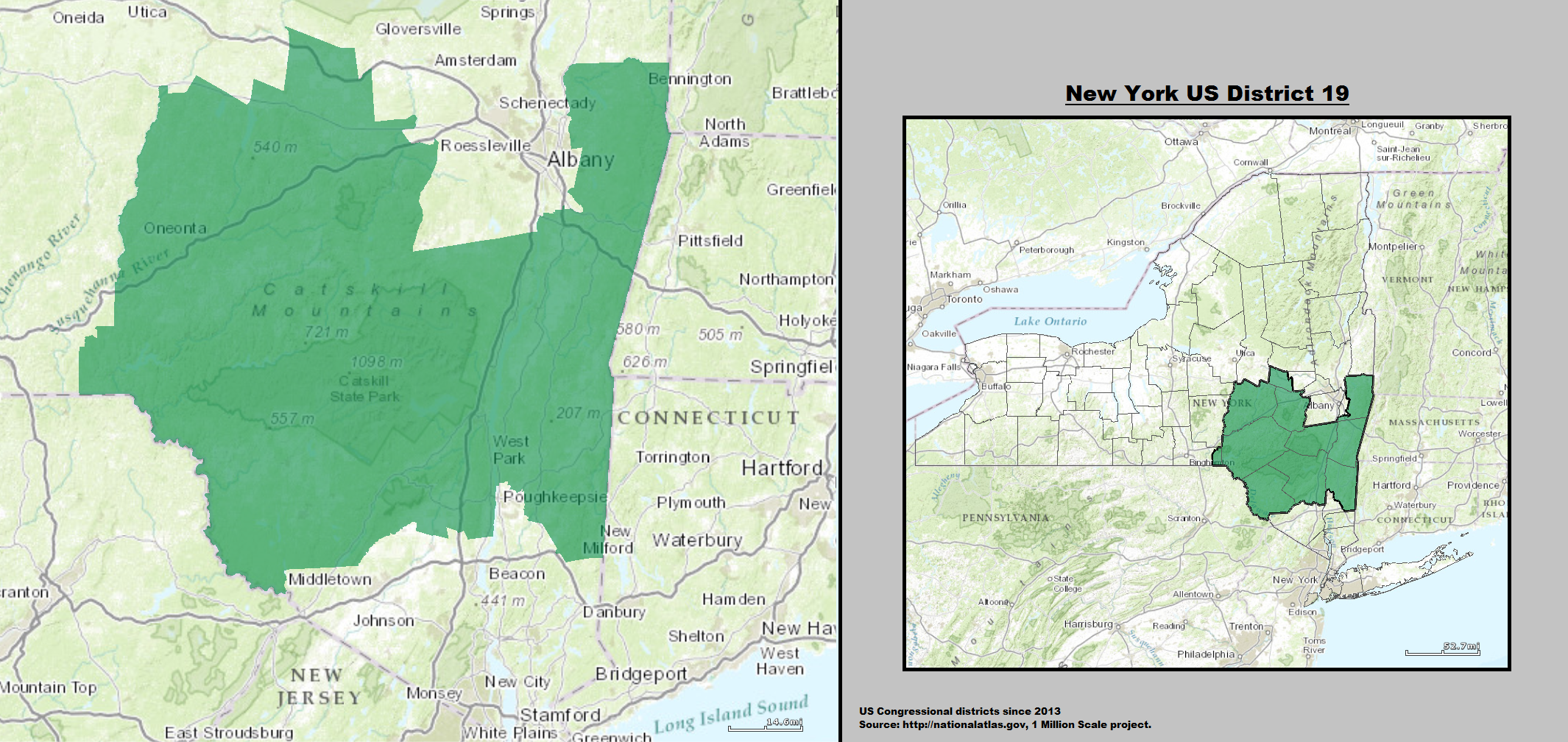
The district from 2013 to 2023

- All of Columbia, Delaware, Greene, Otsego, Schoharie, Sullivan, Ulster
- Parts of Broome, Dutchess, Montgomery, Rensselaer

After redistricting in 2012, the 19th district comprised all of Columbia, Delaware, Greene, Otsego, Schoharie, Sullivan, and Ulster Counties; and parts of Broome, Dutchess, Montgomery, and Rensselaer Counties. The district borders Vermont, Massachusetts, and Connecticut to the east; and Pennsylvania to the southwest. Democratic President Barack Obama won the new district by 6.2% in 2012, while Republican Donald Trump won the district by 6.8% in 2016.

Incumbent Representative Nan Hayworth opted to follow most of her constituents into the new 18th district in 2012, but she was defeated by Democrat Sean Patrick Maloney, a former advisor to President Bill Clinton. Most of the 2003-13 19th district became part of the 2013-23 18th district. Meanwhile, incumbent 20th district representative Chris Gibson ran for re-election in the new 19th district and won. On January 5, 2015, per his pledge when elected not to serve more than 4 terms, Gibson announced that he would not run for re-election in 2016.

In 2016, Democrat Zephyr Teachout was defeated by Republican John Faso in the election. In 2018, Faso was defeated after only 1 term by Democrat Antonio Delgado. In 2022, Delgado resigned to become Lieutenant Governor, leaving the seat vacant. Democrat Pat Ryan won the special election to complete Delgado's term on August 23, 2022.

This iteration of the district was a presidential bellwether for the duration of its existence, having voted for the winner in each election from 2012 to 2020.

=== 2023–present ===
- All of Broome, Chenango, Columbia, Cortland, Delaware, Greene, Sullivan, Tioga, Tompkins
- Parts of Otsego, Ulster

Ryan ran in the 18th district in the November 2022 general election due to redistricting, while Democrat Josh Riley, who ran in the Democratic primary, lost to Republican Marc Molinaro in the 19th district. In the November 2024 general election, Josh Riley defeated current representative Marc Molinaro. Molinaro refused to concede until the last ballots were counted, despite the AP's conclusion that he had no path to victory.

== Counties, towns, and cities ==
For the 119th and successive Congresses (based on the districts drawn following the New York Court of Appeals' December 2023 decision in Hoffman v New York State Ind. Redistricting. Commn.), the district contains all or portions of the following counties, towns, and cities.

Broome County (17)

All 17 towns and cities

Chenango County (22)

All 22 towns and cities

Columbia County (19)

All 23 towns and cities

Cortland County (9)

Cincinnatus, Freetown, Harford, Lapeer, Marathon (town), Solon, Taylor, Virgil, Willet

Delaware County (19)

All 19 towns

Greene County (14)

All 14 towns

Otsego County (25)

All 25 towns and cities

Rensselaer County (10)

Berlin, Brunswick (part; also 20th), East Greenbush, Grafton, Nassau, Petersburgh, Poestenkill, Sand Lake, Schodack, Stephentown

Sullivan County (15)

All 15 towns

Tompkins County (10)

All 10 towns and cities

Ulster County (11)

Denning, Gardiner (part; also 18th), Hardenburgh, Hurley, Marbletown, Olive, Rochester, Rosendale, Shandaken, Shawangunk, Wawarsing

== List of members representing the district ==
Representative	Party	Years	Cong- ress	Electoral history	District location
District established March 4, 1813
James Geddes (Onondaga)	Federalist	March 4, 1813 – March 3, 1815	13th	Elected in 1812. Lost re-election.	
Victory Birdseye (Pompey)	Democratic- Republican	March 4, 1815 – March 3, 1817	14th	Re-elected in 1814. [data missing]	
James Porter (Skaneateles)	Democratic- Republican	March 4, 1817 – March 3, 1819	15th	Elected in 1816. [data missing]	
George Hall (Onondaga)	Democratic- Republican	March 4, 1819 – March 3, 1821	16th	Elected in 1818. Lost re-election.	
Vacant		March 4, 1821 – December 3, 1821	17th	Elections were held in April 1821. It is unclear when results were announced or credentials issued.	
Elisha Litchfield (Delphi Falls)	Democratic- Republican	December 3, 1821 – March 3, 1823	17th	Elected in 1821. Redistricted to the 23rd district.	
John Richards (Johnsburg)	Crawford DR	March 4, 1823 – March 3, 1825	18th	Elected in 1822. [data missing]	
Henry H. Ross (Essex)	Anti-Jacksonian	March 4, 1825 – March 3, 1827	19th	Elected in 1824. [data missing]	
Richard Keese (Keeseville)	Jacksonian	March 4, 1827 – March 3, 1829	20th	Elected in 1826. [data missing]	
Isaac Finch (Jay)	Anti-Jacksonian	March 4, 1829 – March 3, 1831	21st	Elected in 1828. [data missing]	
William Hogan (Hogansburg)	Jacksonian	March 4, 1831 – March 3, 1833	22nd	Elected in 1830. [data missing]	
Sherman Page (Unadilla)	Jacksonian	March 4, 1833 – March 3, 1837	23rd 24th	Elected in 1832. Re-elected in 1834. [data missing]	
John H. Prentiss (Cooperstown)	Democratic	March 4, 1837 – March 3, 1841	25th 26th	Elected in 1836. Re-elected in 1838. [data missing]	
Samuel S. Bowne (Cooperstown)	Democratic	March 4, 1841 – March 3, 1843	27th	Elected in 1840. [data missing]	
Orville Hungerford (Waterford)	Democratic	March 4, 1843 – March 3, 1847	28th 29th	Elected in 1842. Re-elected in 1844. [data missing]	
Joseph Mullin (Watertown)	Whig	March 4, 1847 – March 3, 1849	30th	Elected in 1846. [data missing]	
Charles E. Clarke (Great Bend)	Whig	March 4, 1849 – March 3, 1851	31st	Elected in 1848. [data missing]	
Willard Ives (Watertown)	Democratic	March 4, 1851 – March 3, 1853	32nd	Elected in 1850. [data missing]	
George W. Chase (Schenevus)	Whig	March 4, 1853 – March 3, 1855	33rd	Elected in 1852. [data missing]	
Jonas A. Hughston (Delhi)	Opposition	March 4, 1855 – March 3, 1857	34th	Elected in 1854. [data missing]	
Oliver A. Morse (Cherry Valley)	Republican	March 4, 1857 – March 3, 1859	35th	Elected in 1856. [data missing]	
James H. Graham (Delhi)	Republican	March 4, 1859 – March 3, 1861	36th	Elected in 1858. [data missing]	
Richard Franchot (Schenectady)	Republican	March 4, 1861 – March 3, 1863	37th	Elected in 1860. [data missing]	
Samuel F. Miller (Franklin)	Republican	March 4, 1863 – March 3, 1865	38th	Elected in 1862. [data missing]	
Demas Hubbard Jr. (Smyrna)	Republican	March 4, 1865 – March 3, 1867	39th	Elected in 1864. [data missing]	
William C. Fields (Laurens)	Republican	March 4, 1867 – March 3, 1869	40th	Elected in 1866. [data missing]	
Charles Knapp (Deposit)	Republican	March 4, 1869 – March 3, 1871	41st	Elected in 1868. [data missing]	
Elizur H. Prindle (Norwich)	Republican	March 4, 1871 – March 3, 1873	42nd	Elected in 1870. [data missing]	
Henry H. Hathorn (Saratoga Springs)	Republican	March 4, 1873 – March 3, 1875	43rd	Elected in 1872. Redistricted to the 20th district.	
William A. Wheeler (Malone)	Republican	March 4, 1875 – March 3, 1877	44th	Redistricted from the 18th district and re-elected in 1874. [data missing]	
Amaziah B. James (Ogdensburg)	Republican	March 4, 1877 – March 3, 1881	45th 46th	Elected in 1876. Re-elected in 1878. [data missing]	
Abraham X. Parker (Potsdam)	Republican	March 4, 1881 – March 3, 1885	47th 48th	Elected in 1880. Re-elected in 1882. Redistricted to the 22nd district.	
John Swinburne (Albany)	Republican	March 4, 1885 – March 3, 1887	49th	Elected in 1884. [data missing]	
Nicholas T. Kane (Albany)	Democratic	March 4, 1887 – September 14, 1887	50th	Elected in 1886. Died.	
Vacant		September 14, 1887 – November 8, 1887	50th		
Charles Tracey (Albany)	Democratic	November 8, 1887 – March 3, 1893	50th 51st 52nd	Elected to finish Kane's term. Re-elected in 1888. Re-elected in 1890. Redistricted to the 20th district.	
Charles D. Haines (Kinderhook)	Democratic	March 4, 1893 – March 3, 1895	53rd	Elected in 1892. [data missing]	
Frank S. Black (Troy)	Republican	March 4, 1895 – January 7, 1897	54th	Elected in 1894. Resigned after being elected Governor of New York	
Vacant		January 7, 1897 – March 3, 1897	54th		
Aaron Van Schaick Cochrane (Hudson)	Republican	March 4, 1897 – March 3, 1901	55th 56th	Elected in 1896. Re-elected in 1898. [data missing]	
William H. Draper (Troy)	Republican	March 4, 1901 – March 3, 1903	57th	Elected in 1900. Redistricted to the 22nd district.	
Norton P. Otis (Yonkers)	Republican	March 4, 1903 – February 20, 1905	58th	Elected in 1902. Died.	
Vacant		February 20, 1905 – March 3, 1905	58th		
John E. Andrus (Yonkers)	Republican	March 4, 1905 – March 3, 1913	59th 60th 61st 62nd	Elected in 1904. Re-elected in 1906. Re-elected in 1908. Re-elected in 1910. [data missing]	
Walter M. Chandler (New York)	Progressive	March 4, 1913 – March 3, 1917	63rd 64th 65th	Elected in 1912. Re-elected in 1914. Re-elected in 1916 [data missing]	
Walter M. Chandler (New York)	Republican	March 4, 1917 – March 3, 1919	63rd 64th 65th	Elected in 1912. Re-elected in 1914. Re-elected in 1916 [data missing]	
Joseph Rowan (New York)	Democratic	March 4, 1919 – March 3, 1921	66th	Elected in 1918. Lost re-election.	
Walter M. Chandler (New York)	Republican	March 4, 1921 – March 3, 1923	67th	Elected in 1920. Lost re-election.	
Sol Bloom (New York)	Democratic	March 4, 1923 – January 3, 1945	68th 69th 70th 71st 72nd 73rd 74th 75th 76th 77th 78th	Elected to fill the term when Representative-elect Samuel Marx died. Re-elected in 1924. Re-elected in 1926. Re-elected in 1928. Re-elected in 1930. Re-elected in 1932. Re-elected in 1934. Re-elected in 1936. Re-elected in 1938. Re-elected in 1940. Re-elected in 1942. Redistricted to the 20th district.	
Samuel Dickstein (New York)	Democratic	January 3, 1945 – December 30, 1945	79th	Redistricted from the 12th district and re-elected in 1944. Resigned to become justice of the New York Supreme Court.	
Vacant		December 31, 1945 – February 18, 1946	79th		
Arthur G. Klein (New York)	Democratic	February 19, 1946 – December 31, 1956	79th 80th 81st 82nd 83rd 84th	Elected to finish Dickstein's term. Re-elected in 1946. Re-elected in 1948. Re-elected in 1950. Re-elected in 1952. Re-elected in 1954. Resigned to become justice on New York Supreme Court.	
Vacant		January 1, 1957 – January 2, 1957	84th		
Leonard Farbstein (New York)	Democratic	January 3, 1957 – January 3, 1971	85th 86th 87th 88th 89th 90th 91st	Elected in 1956. Re-elected in 1958. Re-elected in 1960. Re-elected in 1962. Re-elected in 1964. Re-elected in 1966. Re-elected in 1968. Lost renomination.	
Bella Abzug (New York)	Democratic	January 3, 1971 – January 3, 1973	92nd	Elected in 1970. Redistricted to the 20th district.	
Charles Rangel (New York)	Democratic	January 3, 1973 – January 3, 1983	93rd 94th 95th 96th 97th	Redistricted from the 18th district and re-elected in 1972. Re-elected in 1974. Re-elected in 1976. Re-elected in 1978. Re-elected in 1980. Redistricted to the 16th district.	
Mario Biaggi (The Bronx)	Democratic	January 3, 1983 – August 5, 1988	98th 99th 100th	Redistricted from the 10th district and re-elected in 1982. Re-elected in 1984. Re-elected in 1986. Resigned.	
Vacant		August 6, 1988 – January 2, 1989	100th		
Eliot Engel (The Bronx)	Democratic	January 3, 1989 – January 3, 1993	101st 102nd	Elected in 1988. Re-elected in 1990. Redistricted to the 17th district.	
Hamilton Fish IV (Millbrook)	Republican	January 3, 1993 – January 3, 1995	103rd	Redistricted from the 21st district and re-elected in 1992. Retired.	
Sue W. Kelly (Katonah)	Republican	January 3, 1995 – January 3, 2007	104th 105th 106th 107th 108th 109th	Elected in 1994. Re-elected in 1996. Re-elected in 1998. Re-elected in 2000. Re-elected in 2002. Re-elected in 2004. Lost re-election.	
Sue W. Kelly (Katonah)	Republican	January 3, 1995 – January 3, 2007	104th 105th 106th 107th 108th 109th	Elected in 1994. Re-elected in 1996. Re-elected in 1998. Re-elected in 2000. Re-elected in 2002. Re-elected in 2004. Lost re-election.	2003–2013
John Hall (Dover Plains)	Democratic	January 3, 2007 – January 3, 2011	110th 111th	Elected in 2006. Re-elected in 2008. Lost re-election.	2003–2013
Nan Hayworth (Bedford Corners)	Republican	January 3, 2011 – January 3, 2013	112th	Elected in 2010. Redistricted to the 18th district and lost re-election there.	2003–2013
Chris Gibson (Kinderhook)	Republican	January 3, 2013 – January 3, 2017	113th 114th	Redistricted from the 20th district and re-elected in 2012. Re-elected in 2014. Retired.	2013–2023
John Faso (Kinderhook)	Republican	January 3, 2017 – January 3, 2019	115th	Elected in 2016. Lost re-election.	2013–2023
Antonio Delgado (Rhinebeck)	Democratic	January 3, 2019 – May 25, 2022	116th 117th	Elected in 2018. Re-elected in 2020. Resigned to become Lieutenant Governor of New York.	2013–2023
Vacant		May 25, 2022 – September 13, 2022	117th		2013–2023
Pat Ryan (Gardiner)	Democratic	September 13, 2022 – January 3, 2023	117th	Elected to finish Delgado's term. Redistricted to the 18th district.	2013–2023
Marc Molinaro (Catskill)	Republican	January 3, 2023 – January 3, 2025	118th	Elected in 2022. Lost re-election.	2023–2025
Josh Riley (Ithaca)	Democratic	January 3, 2025 – present	119th	Elected in 2024. Re-elected in 2026.	2025–present

== Election results ==
Note that in New York State electoral politics there are numerous minor parties at various points on the political spectrum. Certain parties will endorse either the Republican or Democratic candidate for every office, hence the state electoral results contain both the party votes, and the final candidate votes (Listed as "Recap").

U.S. House election, 1996: New York District 19
Party	Candidate	Votes	%	±%
Republican	Sue W. Kelly (incumbent)	102,142	46.3	
Democratic	Richard S. Klein	86,926	39.4	
Conservative	Joseph J. DioGuardi	27,424	12.4	
Independence	William E. Haase	4,104	1.9	
Majority		15,216	6.9	
Turnout		220,596		

U.S. House election, 1998: New York District 19
Party	Candidate	Votes	%	±%
Republican	Sue W. Kelly (incumbent)	104,467	62.2	+15.9
Democratic	Dick Collins	56,378	33.6	−5.8
Right to Life	Joseph J. DioGuardi	5,941	3.5	+3.5
Freedom Party	Charles C. Williams	1,046	0.6	+0.6
Majority		48,089	28.7	+21.8
Turnout		167,832		−23.9

U.S. House election, 2000: New York District 19
Party	Candidate	Votes	%	±%
Republican	Sue W. Kelly (incumbent)	145,532	60.9	−1.3
Democratic	Lawrence Otis Graham	85,871	35.9	+2.3
Right to Life	Frank X. Lloyd	4,086	1.7	−1.8
Green	Mark R. Jacobs	3,662	1.5	+1.5
Majority		59,661	24.9	−3.8
Turnout		239,151		+42.5

U.S. House election, 2002: New York District 19
Party	Candidate	Votes	%	±%
Republican	Sue W. Kelly (incumbent)	121,129	70.0	+9.1
Democratic	Janine M. H. Selendy	44,967	26.0	−9.9
Right to Life	Christine M. Tighe	4,374	2.5	+0.8
Green	Jonathan M. Wright	2,642	1.5	−0.0
Majority		76,162	44.0	+19.1
Turnout		173,112		−27.6

U.S. House election, 2004: New York District 19
Party	Candidate	Votes	%	±%
Republican	Sue W. Kelly (incumbent)	175,401	66.7	−3.3
Democratic	Michael Jaliman	87,429	33.3	+7.3
Majority		87,972	33.5	−10.5
Turnout		262,830		+51.8

U.S. House election, 2006: New York District 19
Party	Candidate	Votes	%	±%
Democratic	John Hall	100,119	51.2	+17.9
Republican	Sue W. Kelly (incumbent)	95,359	48.8	−17.9
Majority		4,760	2.4	−31.1
Turnout		195,478		−25.6

U.S. House election, 2008: New York District 19
Party	Candidate	Votes	%	±%
Democratic	John Hall (incumbent)	164,859	58.7	+7.5
Republican	Kieran Lalor	116,120	41.3	−7.5
Majority		48,739	17.3	14.9
Turnout		280,979		43.7

U.S. House election, 2010: New York District 19
Party	Candidate	Votes	%	±%
Republican	Nan Hayworth	109,956	52.5	+11.2
Democratic	John Hall (incumbent)	98,766	47.5	−11.2
Majority		11,190	5.3	−12
Turnout		209,285		−25.5

U.S. House election, 2012: New York District 19
Party	Candidate	Votes	%	±%
Republican	Chris Gibson	149,763	52.9	+0.4
Democratic	Julian Schreibman	133,567	47.1	−0.4
Majority		16,196	5.7	0.4
Turnout		283,303		35.4

U.S. House election, 2014: New York District 19
Party	Candidate	Votes	%	±%
Republican	Chris Gibson (incumbent)	131,594	62.6	+9.7
Democratic	Sean Eldridge	72,470	34.5	−12.6
Majority		59,124	28.1	22.4
Turnout		210,351		−25.7

U.S. House election, 2016: New York District 19
Party	Candidate	Votes	%	±%
Republican	John Faso	166,171	54.1	−8.5
Democratic	Zephyr Teachout	141,224	45.9	+11.4
Majority		24,947	6.1	−20.0
Turnout		307,395		46.13

U.S. House election, 2018: New York District 19
Party	Candidate	Votes	%	±%
Democratic	Antonio Delgado	147,873	51.4	+5.5
Republican	John Faso (incumbent)	132,873	46.1	−8
Majority		15,000	5.3	−0.8
Turnout		287,894		−6.3

U.S. House election, 2020: New York District 19
Party	Candidate	Votes	%
Democratic	Antonio Delgado	168,281	48.0
Working Families	Antonio Delgado	22,969	6.6
SAM	Antonio Delgado	850	0.2
Total	Antonio Delgado (incumbent)	192,100	54.8
Republican	Kyle Van De Water	151,475	43.2
Libertarian	Victoria Alexander	4,224	1.2
Green	Steve Greenfield	2,799	0.8
Total votes		350,598	100.0
Democratic hold			

U.S. House special election, 2022: New York District 19
Party	Candidate	Votes	%
Democratic	Pat Ryan	58,427	45.3
Working Families	Pat Ryan	7,516	5.8
Total	Pat Ryan	65,943	51.8
Republican	Marc Molinaro	52,350	40.5
Conservative	Marc Molinaro	10,602	8.2
Total	Marc Molinaro	62,952	48.1
Write-in		96	0.07
Total votes		128,991	100.0
Democratic hold			

U.S. House election, 2022: New York District 19
Party	Candidate	Votes	%
Republican	Marc Molinaro	129,960	45.18%
Conservative	Marc Molinaro	16,044	5.58%
Total	Marc Molinaro	146,004	50.76%
Democratic	Josh Riley	124,396	43.25%
Working Families	Josh Riley	17,113	5.95%
Total	Josh Riley	141,509	49.20%
Write-in		105	0.04%
Total votes		287,618	100%

U.S. House election, 2024: New York District 19
Party	Candidate	Votes	%
Democratic	Josh Riley	170,049	45.1
Working Families	Josh Riley	22,598	6.0
Total	Josh Riley	192,647	51.1
Republican	Marc Molinaro	164,001	43.5
Conservative	Marc Molinaro	20,289	5.4
Total	Marc Molinaro (incumbent)	184,290	48.9
Total votes		376,937	100.0
Democratic gain from Republican			

== See also ==
- List of United States congressional districts
- New York's congressional delegations
- New York's congressional districts
