= Demas Hubbard Jr. =

American politician

Member of the United States House of Representatives
- In office March 4, 1865 – March 3, 1867
- Preceded by: Samuel F. Miller
- Succeeded by: William C. Fields
- Constituency: New York's 19th congressional district

Town Supervisor of Smyrna, New York
- In office 1859–1864
- Preceded by: Asa Wilber
- Succeeded by: Andrew Shepardson

Member of the New York State Assembly
- In office January 1, 1838 – December 31, 1840 Serving with Henry Balcom, Justus Parce (1838); Samuel Drew, Josiah G. Olney (1839); William Church, Samuel Plumb (1840)
- Preceded by: John F. Hill, Squire Smith, Isaac Stokes
- Succeeded by: Calvin Cole, Eber Dimmick, Benson H. Wheeler
- Constituency: Chenango County

Personal details
- Born: January 17, 1806 Winfield, New York, U.S.
- Died: September 2, 1873 (aged 67) Smyrna, New York, U.S.
- Resting place: Smyrna East Cemetery, Smyrna, New York, U.S.
- Party: Republican
- Other political affiliations: Whig
- Spouse(s): Laura Catlin; Caroline Franklin
- Children: 3
- Profession: Attorney

Demas Hubbard Jr. (January 17, 1806 – September 2, 1873) was a U.S. representative from New York.

== Biography ==
Hubbard was born in Winfield, New York on January 17, 1806, the son of Demas Hubbard and Fanny (Cutler) Hubbard. He attended the public schools and became a farmer. In 1829 he was elected Overseer of Highways for the Village of Smyrna. From 1831 to 1832 he was Smyrna's Village Clerk. He studied law, was admitted to the bar, and commenced practice in Smyrna, New York, in 1835.

A Whig at the start of his career, Hubbard served as a member of the New York State Assembly from 1838 to 1840. He became a Republican when the party was organized in the 1850s. He was Smyrna's Town Supervisor from 1859 to 1864, and also served as Chairman of the Chenango County Board of Supervisors. From 1862 to 1863 he served as President of the Village of Smyrna.

Hubbard was elected as a Republican to the 39th Congress (March 4, 1865 – March 3, 1867). He was not a candidate for re-nomination in 1866 and returned to practicing law.

He died in Smyrna on September 2, 1873. He was buried at Smyrna East Cemetery.

== Family ==
Hubbard's first wife was Laura Catlin, who died in 1830. His second wife was Caroline Franklin, who died in 1873. With his first wife, Hubbard was the father of Alvin C. Hubbard (1829–1867). With his second wife, he was the father of Abigail Laura Hubbard (1830–1880) and Franklin Hubbard (1832–1853).

U.S. House of Representatives
Preceded by Samuel F. Miller	Member of the U.S. House of Representatives from New York's 19th congressional district March 4, 1865 – March 3, 1867	Succeeded by William C. Fields
