= Stanislaus P. Franchot =

American politician

Stanislaus Pascal Franchot II (January 30, 1851 – March 24, 1908) was an American civil engineer and politician from New York.

== Life ==
He was born on January 30, 1851, in Morris, Otsego County, New York, the son of Congressman Richard Franchot (1816–1875) and Ann (Van Vranken) Franchot (1822–1881). He attended the common schools in Schenectady, and graduated C.E. from Union College in 1871. On May 7, 1874, he married Annie Powers Eells (1852–1935); and they had four children, among them Assemblyman Nicholas V. V. Franchot II (1884–1938).

About 1898, he removed to Niagara Falls, and was general manager of a company which manufactured chemicals.

Franchot was a member of the New York State Senate (47th D.) in 1907 and 1908.

He died on March 24, 1908, in Montreal, Quebec, Canada, after an operation.

New York Superintendent of Public Works Nicholas Van Vranken Franchot (1855–1943) was his brother.

New York State Senate
Preceded by Henry W. Hill	New York State Senate; 47th District; 1907–1908	Succeeded by William C. Wallace
