= Richard Franchot =

American politician

Richard Hansen Franchot
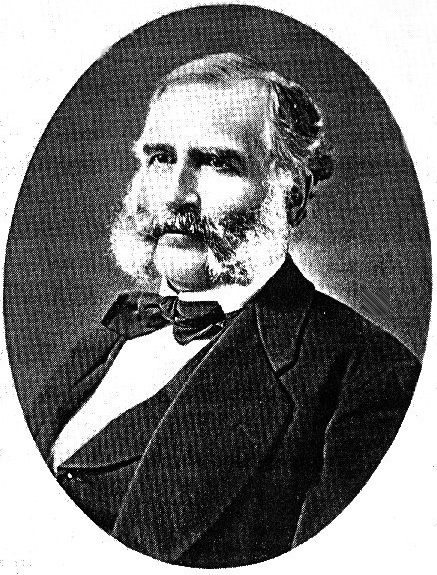

Member of the U.S. House of Representatives from New York's 19th district
- In office March 4, 1861 – March 3, 1863
- Preceded by: James H. Graham
- Succeeded by: Samuel F. Miller

Personal details
- Born: June 2, 1816 Morris, New York, U.S.
- Died: November 23, 1875 (aged 59) Schenectady, New York, U.S.
- Resting place: Vale Cemetery
- Party: Republican
- Children: Nicholas Van Vranken Franchot; Stanislaus P. Franchot

Military service
- Allegiance: United States (Union)
- Branch/service: U.S. Army Infantry Branch
- Years of service: 1862
- Rank: Colonel; Brigadier General (Brevet)
- Unit: Union Army
- Commands: 121st New York Infantry
- Battles/wars: American Civil War

Richard Hansen Franchot (June 2, 1816 – November 23, 1875) was a U.S. representative from New York and then an officer in the Union Army during the American Civil War. He was also an executive of two railroad companies, Albany and Susquehanna Railroad and Central Pacific Railroad.

== Biography ==
Franchot was born in the town of Morris, Otsego County, New York, the son of French immigrant Paschal Franchot. He attended the public schools and the Hartwick and Cherry Valley Academies. He studied civil engineering at Rensselaer Polytechnic Institute, in Troy, New York. He served for several years as president of the Albany and Susquehanna Railroad.

Franchot was elected as a Republican to the Thirty-seventh Congress (March 4, 1861 – March 3, 1863). He was not a candidate for renomination in 1862.

He moved to Schenectady, New York, and raised the 121st New York Infantry. Franchot was commissioned as a colonel on August 23, 1862, and was brevetted as a brigadier general of U.S. Volunteers dating from March 13, 1865.

After the war, he was associated with the Central Pacific Railroad.

Franchot died in Schenectady on November 23, 1875. He was interred in Vale Cemetery.

== Family ==
New York Superintendent of Public Works Nicholas Van Vranken Franchot (1855–1943) and State Senator Stanislaus P. Franchot (1851–1908) were his sons, Assemblyman Nicholas V. V. Franchot II (1884–1938) was his grandson, actor Franchot Tone (1905-1968) was his great-grandson, and former Maryland Comptroller Peter Franchot (1947–) is also his descendant.

U.S. House of Representatives
Preceded by James H. Graham	Member of the U.S. House of Representatives from New York's 19th congressional district 1861–1863	Succeeded by Samuel F. Miller
