= Nicholas van Vranken Franchot =

American businessman and politician (1855–1943)

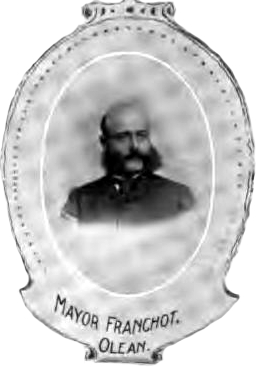
Nicholas V. V. Franchot (1897)

Nicholas van Vranken Franchot (August 21, 1855 – May 6, 1943) was an American businessman and politician from New York.

== Life ==
He was born on August 21, 1855, in Morris, Otsego County, New York, the son of Congressman Richard Franchot (1816–1875) and Ann (Van Vranken) Franchot (1822–1881). He graduated from Union College in 1875. In 1876, he removed to Olean, Cattaraugus County, New York, and engaged in the oil business. On November 5, 1879, he married Annie Conyne Wood (1859–1928), and they had five children.

He was a delegate to the 1892 and 1904 Republican National Convention; and mayor of Olean from 1894 to 1898. On January 4, 1905, he was appointed by Governor Frank W. Higgins as New York State Superintendent of Public Works, and remained in office until January 14, 1907.

He died on May 6, 1943, at his home in Olean, New York; and was buried at the Hillington Cemetery in Morris. Franchot Park in Olean is named after him, and is on land deeded by him to the city.

Senator Stanislaus P. Franchot (1851–1908) was his brother; and assemblyman Nicholas V. V. Franchot II (1884–1938) was his nephew.

Government offices
Preceded by Charles S. Boyd	Superintendent of Public Works; 1905–1907	Succeeded by Frederick C. Stevens
