= Nicholas V. V. Franchot II =

American businessman and politician

Nicholas Van Vranken Franchot II (May 5, 1884 – December 14, 1938) was an American businessman and politician from New York.

== Biography ==
He was the son of State Senator Stanislaus P. Franchot (1851–1908) and Annie Powers (Eells) Franchot (1852–1935). He engaged in the insurance business. On October 12, 1909, he married Alice Pearson.

He was a member of the New York State Assembly (Niagara Co., 2nd D.) in 1918, 1919 and 1921.

He died on December 14, 1938, in Niagara Falls, New York.

== Legacy ==
New York Superintendent of Public Works Nicholas Van Vranken Franchot (1855–1943) was his uncle; and Congressman Richard Franchot (1816–1875) was his grandfather.

New York State Assembly
Preceded by Alan V. Parker	New York State Assembly; Niagara County, 2nd District; 1918–1919	Succeeded by Alan V. Parker
Preceded by Alan V. Parker	New York State Assembly; Niagara County, 2nd District; 1921	Succeeded by Frank S. Hall
