= A. W. Duncan =

English-Australian chemist and vegetarianism activist (1856–1946)

A. W. Duncan FCS
- Born: Arthur William Duncan; 1856; Hull, Yorkshire, England
- Died: 23 July 1946 (aged 90); Punchbowl, New South Wales, Australia
- Occupations: Chemist, vegetarianism activist
- Spouse: Annie Margaret Allison (m. 1890)
- Children: 2

Arthur William Duncan FCS (1856 – 23 July 1946) was an English-Australian analytical chemist and vegetarianism activist.

== Career ==
Duncan was born in Hull, Yorkshire. He became a vegetarian as a young man through reading the work of T. L. Nichols. He contacted R. Bailey Walker and joined the Vegetarian Society in 1877. He worked as an analytical chemist in Manchester and for James Woolley, Sons and Co., manufacture chemists. Duncan had studied with Carl Remigius Fresenius. He was also a Fellow of the Chemical Society.

In 1884, Duncan authored a pamphlet The Chemistry of Foods. It was republished as The Chemistry of Food and Nutrition by the Vegetarian Society in 1905. Charles W. Forward noted that Duncan had given "valuable aid to the Vegetarian Society in connection with the chemistry of food, and has contributed many useful essays and papers on the subject".

Duncan was on the executive committee of the Vegetarian Society in 1880 and later served as a vice-president. In 1899, Duncan commented that "a grain of wheat contains everything that is required for nutrition and these constituents are in the right proportion, so that were it necessary we could live on wheatmeal bread and water alone". He later moved to New South Wales, Australia but remained in contact with vegetarians in England and was an officer for the Vegetarian Society in 1935.

== Personal life and death ==
Duncan was a teetotaller. He married Annie Margaret Allison in 1890. They had two children: Frank and Phyllis. Duncan died in Punchbowl, New South Wales in 1946, aged 90. He was privately cremated at Rockwood crematorium. His wife died in 1947.

== Selected publications ==
- Foods and Their Comparative Values. Manchester: Vegetarian Society. 1889.
- The Chemistry of Food and Nutrition. Manchester: Vegetarian Society. 1905.
