= Bayard Clarke =

American politician

Member of the House of Representatives from New York's 9th district
- In office March 4, 1855 – March 3, 1857
- Preceded by: Jared V. Peck
- Succeeded by: John B. Haskin

Personal details
- Born: March 17, 1815 New York City, US
- Died: June 20, 1884 (aged 69) Schroon Lake, New York, US
- Party: Whig
- Spouse: Alletta Remsen Lawrence
- Education: Geneva College
- Occupation: lawyer

Military service
- Allegiance: United States
- Branch/service: US Army; Union Army
- Years of service: 1841–1843; 1861
- Rank: Second Lieutenant (US Army); Colonel (Union Army)
- Battles/wars: Seminole Wars; American Civil War

Bayard Clarke (March 17, 1815 – June 20, 1884) was a United States representative from New York.

== Biography ==
Born in New York City on March 17, 1815, Clarke was a member of one of the city's oldest and most prominent families. He graduated from Geneva College in 1835, studied law, and was admitted to the bar.

From 1836 to 1840 he was attaché to Lewis Cass, United States Minister to France. While in France he was a student in the Royal Cavalry School.

Upon returning to the United States, Clarke joined the United States Army, receiving a commission as a second lieutenant in the 8th Infantry in March, 1841. He transferred to the 2nd Dragoons in September, 1841. During his service Clarke took part in the Seminole Wars in Florida.

Clarke resigned from the army in December, 1843 and practiced law in New York City and Westchester County. Also in December, 1843 he married Alletta Remsen Lawrence, a member of another prominent New York family.

He was an unsuccessful Whig candidate for election in 1852 to the Thirty-third Congress. In 1854 he was elected to the Thirty-fourth Congress as a Whig, holding office from March 4, 1855, to March 3, 1857. Clarke received the support of other parties, including the Know Nothings and the anti-slavery Opposition Party; after the election, he was among the members of the House who attempted to organize these groups into an abolitionist movement. He declined renomination as a Republican in 1856 and resumed practicing law.

At the start of the American Civil War, Clarke went to Washington, D.C. to offer his services. He was commissioned as a colonel, and was an organizer of the 1st New York Cavalry Regiment (Lincoln Cavalry), which was commanded by Carl Schurz, Clarke, and then Andrew T. McReynolds.

In mid-1861 there were news accounts indicating that Clarke would be commissioned a brigadier general and assigned to command a school for cavalry in Westchester County. This plan does not seem to have been carried out, since there are no further references to Clarke's promotion or the operation of a cavalry school in Westchester County.

In retirement Clarke lived in England for several years. He later resided in Florida during the winter and an island on Schroon Lake, New York during the summer. He died on June 20, 1884, at his summer home, Isola Bella, in Schroon Lake. He was interred in a vault at First Presbyterian Church Cemetery, Newtown, New York.

His name sometimes appears as "Clark" in contemporary news accounts and other records.

U.S. House of Representatives
Preceded by Jared V. Peck	Member of the U.S. House of Representatives from New York's 9th congressional district 1855–1857	Succeeded by John B. Haskin
