= Timothy J. Campbell =

American lawyer and politician

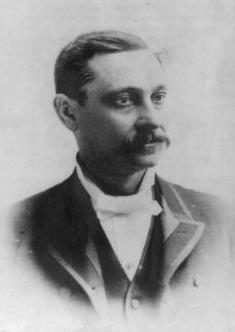

Member of the U.S. House of Representatives from New York
- In office March 4, 1891 – March 3, 1895
- Preceded by: John H. McCarthy
- Succeeded by: Henry C. Miner
- Constituency: 8th district (1891–93); 9th district (1893–95)
- In office November 3, 1885 – March 3, 1889
- Preceded by: Samuel S. Cox
- Succeeded by: John H. McCarthy
- Constituency: 8th district

Member of the New York State Senate
- In office 1884–1885

Member of the New York State Assembly
- In office 1868–73, 1875, 1883

Personal details
- Born: Timothy John Campbell; January 8, 1840 Mullahoran, County Cavan, Ireland, UK
- Died: April 7, 1904 (aged 64) New York City, US
- Party: Democratic

Timothy John Campbell (January 8, 1840 – April 7, 1904) was an American lawyer and politician from New York. He served four terms in the U.S. House of Representatives during the late 19th century.

== Life ==
Born in Mullahoran, County Cavan in Ireland (then a part of the U.K.), he emigrated to New York City.

=== State legislature ===
He was a member of the New York State Assembly (New York Co., 6th D.) in 1868, 1869, 1870, 1871, 1872, 1873, 1875 and 1883.

He was a member of the New York State Senate (6th D.) in 1884 and 1885.

=== Congress ===
He was elected as a Democrat to the 49th United States Congress, to fill the vacancy caused by the resignation of Samuel S. Cox, was re-elected to the 50th, and was elected again to the 52nd and 53rd United States Congresses, holding office from November 3, 1885, to March 3, 1889; and from March 4, 1891, to March 3, 1895.

Campbell earned a touch of immortality of an attributed nature. He is reported to have said to President Grover Cleveland, upon Cleveland's saying he would not support a bill on the grounds that the bill was unconstitutional, "What's the Constitution between friends?" (Bartlett's Familiar Quotations, 16th ed.)

=== Death ===
Campbell died in New York City on April 7, 1904.

New York State Assembly
Preceded by John Siegerson	New York State Assembly; New York County, 6th District; 1868–1873	Succeeded by Matthew Patten
Preceded by Matthew Patten	New York State Assembly; New York County, 6th District; 1875	Succeeded by Matthew Patten
Preceded by Matthew Patten	New York State Assembly; New York County, 6th District; 1883	Succeeded by Peter Henry Jobes
New York State Senate
Preceded by Thomas F. Grady	New York State Senate; 6th District; 1884–1885	Succeeded by Edward F. Reilly
U.S. House of Representatives
Preceded by Samuel S. Cox	Member of the U.S. House of Representatives from New York's 8th congressional district 1885–1889	Succeeded by John H. McCarthy
Preceded by John H. McCarthy	Member of the U.S. House of Representatives from New York's 8th congressional district 1891–1893	Succeeded by Edward J. Dunphy
Preceded by Amos J. Cummings	Member of the U.S. House of Representatives from New York's 9th congressional district 1893–1895	Succeeded by Henry C. Miner
