= Henry M. Goldfogle =

American politician (1856–1929)

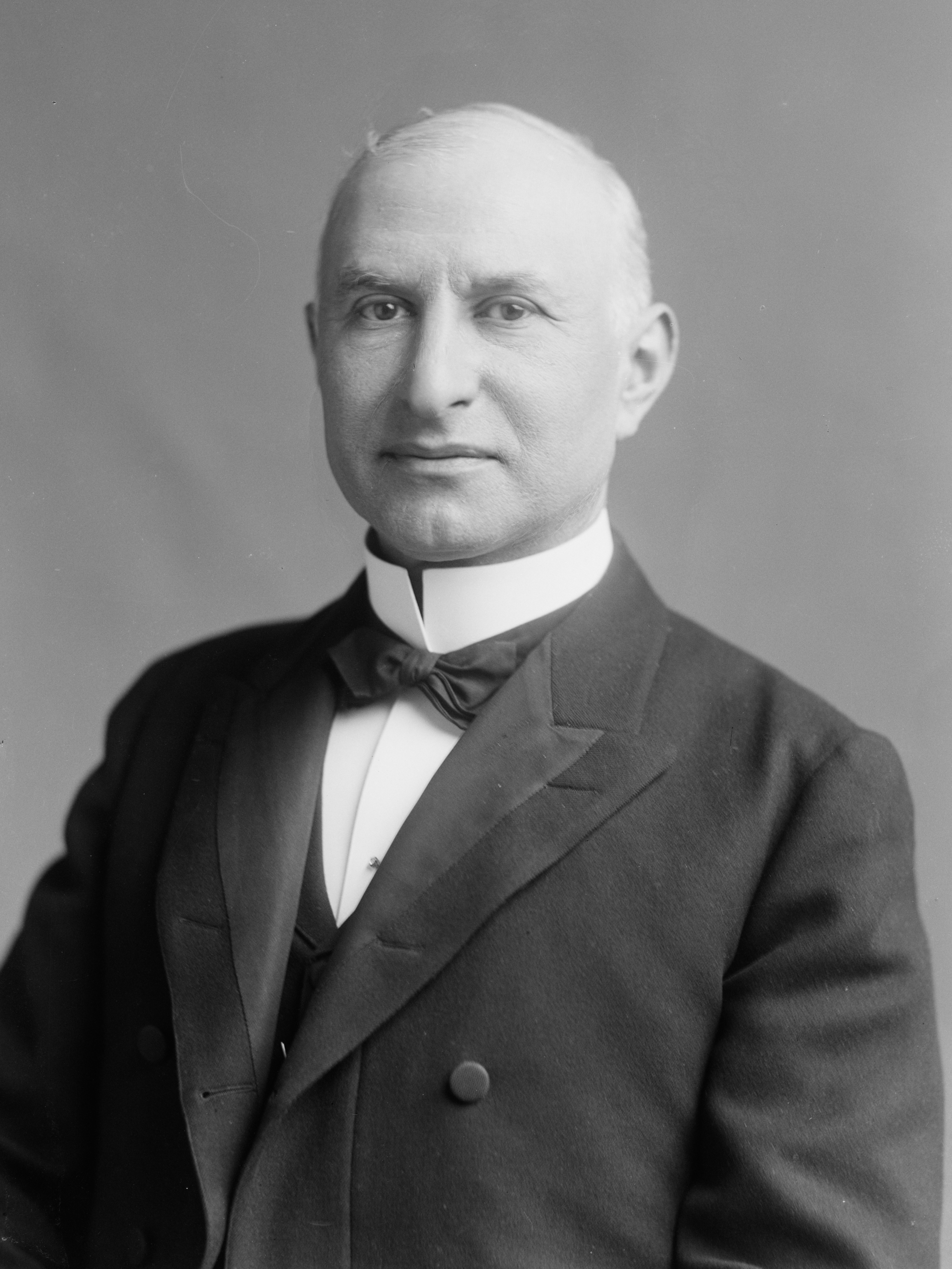
- Goldfogle c. 1901–1903

Member of the U.S. House of Representatives from New York
- In office March 4, 1901 – March 3, 1915
- Preceded by: Thomas J. Bradley
- Succeeded by: Meyer London
- Constituency: 9th district (1901–13); 12th district (1913–15)
- In office March 4, 1919 – March 3, 1921
- Preceded by: Meyer London
- Succeeded by: Meyer London
- Constituency: 12th district

Personal details
- Born: Henry Mayer Goldfogle; May 23, 1856 New York City, U.S.
- Died: June 1, 1929 (aged 73) New York City, U.S.
- Resting place: Union Field Cemetery, Queens, New York City
- Party: Democratic

Henry Mayer Goldfogle (May 23, 1856 – June 1, 1929) was an American lawyer, jurist, and politician who served seven terms as a United States representative from New York from 1901 to 1915.

== Biography ==
Born in New York City, he attended the public schools and Townsend College. He studied law, was admitted to the bar in 1877 and commenced practice in New York City.

=== Early career ===
He was a justice of the fifth district court in New York in 1887 and 1893 and was a judge of the municipal court of New York City from 1888 to 1900.

He resumed the practice of law and was a delegate to the Democratic National Conventions in 1892 and 1896.

=== Congress ===
Goldfogle was elected as a Democrat to the Fifty-seventh and to the six succeeding Congresses, holding office from March 4, 1901, to March 3, 1915. While in the House he was chairman of the Committee on Elections No. 3 (Sixty-second and Sixty-third Congresses). He was an unsuccessful candidate for reelection to the Sixty-fourth and Sixty-fifth Congresses and was then elected to the Sixty-sixth Congress, holding office from March 4, 1919, to March 3, 1921. He was an unsuccessful candidate for reelection in 1920 to the Sixty-seventh Congress and resumed the practice of law.

=== Later career and death ===
In July 1921 he was appointed president of the New York City Board of Taxes and Assessments and served until his death in New York City in 1929. Interment was in Union Field Cemetery, Queens, New York City.

== See also ==
- List of Jewish members of the United States Congress

U.S. House of Representatives
Preceded by Thomas J. Bradley	Member of the U.S. House of Representatives from New York's 9th congressional district 1901–1913	Succeeded by James H. O'Brien
Preceded by Michael F. Conry	Member of the U.S. House of Representatives from New York's 12th congressional district 1913–1915	Succeeded by Meyer London
Preceded by Meyer London	Member of the U.S. House of Representatives from New York's 12th congressional district 1919–1921	Succeeded by Meyer London
