= New York's 9th congressional district =

U.S. House district for New York

- Interactive map of district boundaries since January 3, 2025
- Representative: Yvette Clarke; D–Brooklyn
- Distribution: 100% urban; 0% rural
- Population (2025): 730,291
- Median household income: $76,470
- Ethnicity: 40.6% Black; 32.3% White; 11.4% Hispanic; 9.0% Asian; 5.0% Two or more races; 1.7% other
- Cook PVI: D+22

New York's 9th congressional district is a congressional district for the United States House of Representatives in New York City, represented by Yvette Clarke.

The district is located entirely within Brooklyn. It includes the neighborhoods of Brownsville, Crown Heights, East Flatbush, Flatbush, Kensington, Midwood, Sheepshead Bay, Marine Park, Gerritsen Beach, and Prospect Lefferts Gardens.

Prior to 2013, the district consisted primarily of middle-class white neighborhoods, including large Jewish, Italian, Irish, and Russian populations, in southern Brooklyn and south central Queens. Before redistricting, the Queens Tribune found that the district increasingly swung Republican following the September 11 attacks in 2001, when many police and firefighters were lost from the Rockaways. Its rightward shift was also attributed to the increasing tendency of Orthodox Jews to vote for Republicans. Its representation in Congress was reliably Democratic for decades, electing prominent liberals such as Chuck Schumer and Anthony Weiner, and, prior to that, Emanuel Celler and Elizabeth Holtzman (when the district was differently numbered). Briefly bucking the trend, Republican Bob Turner succeeded Weiner, who resigned on June 21, 2011, after winning the special election on September 13, 2011. However, the previous 9th District was eliminated soon thereafter, after New York lost two districts in the redistricting cycle resulting from the 2010 census, and its territory was divided among several neighboring districts.

After redistricting, Yvette Clarke now represents the district. The district has an African American plurality, and also includes most of the territory previously within the 11th District. It includes significant portions of Midwood, Brooklyn, however, that was previously within the 9th. In the 1980s, the district was based in Astoria and surrounding neighborhoods in Queens. This iteration of the district gained national attention in 1984, when its Representative Geraldine Ferraro became the vice presidential candidate of the Democratic Party.

== Recent election results from statewide races ==
Year	Office	Results
2008	President	Obama 78–21%
2012	President	Obama 80–20%
2016	President	Clinton 79–19%
2016	Senate	Schumer 87–10%
2018	Senate	Gillibrand 86–14%
2018	Governor	Cuomo 83–14%
2018	Attorney General	James 86–13%
2020	President	Biden 76–24%
2022	Senate	Schumer 75–25%
2022	Governor	Hochul 68–32%
2022	Attorney General	James 73–27%
2022	Comptroller	DiNapoli 74–26%
2024	President	Harris 69–29%
2024	Senate	Gillibrand 74–24%

== History ==
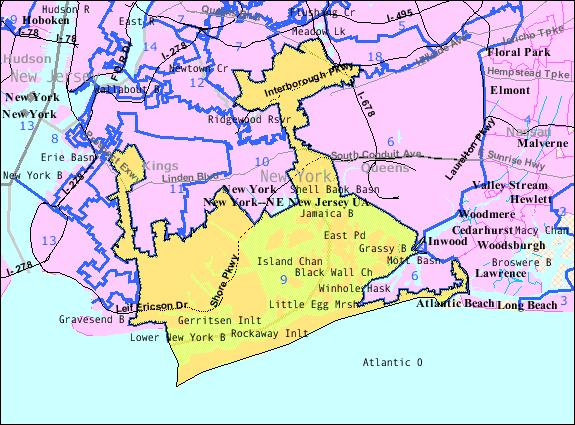
The ninth district from 1993 to 2003

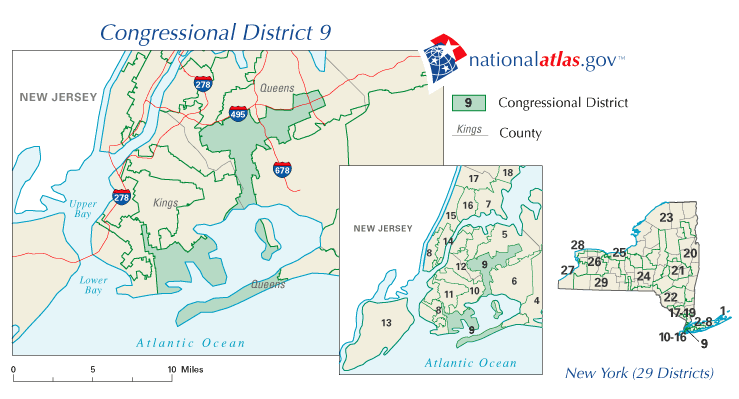
2003–2013

- 1797–1803: Montgomery County
- 1803–1809: [data missing]
- 1809–1913: Montgomery County
- 1913–1945: Parts of Brooklyn, Queens
- 1945–1963: Parts of Brooklyn
- 1963–1993: Parts of Queens
- 1993–2013: Parts of Brooklyn, Queens
- 2013–present: Parts of Brooklyn

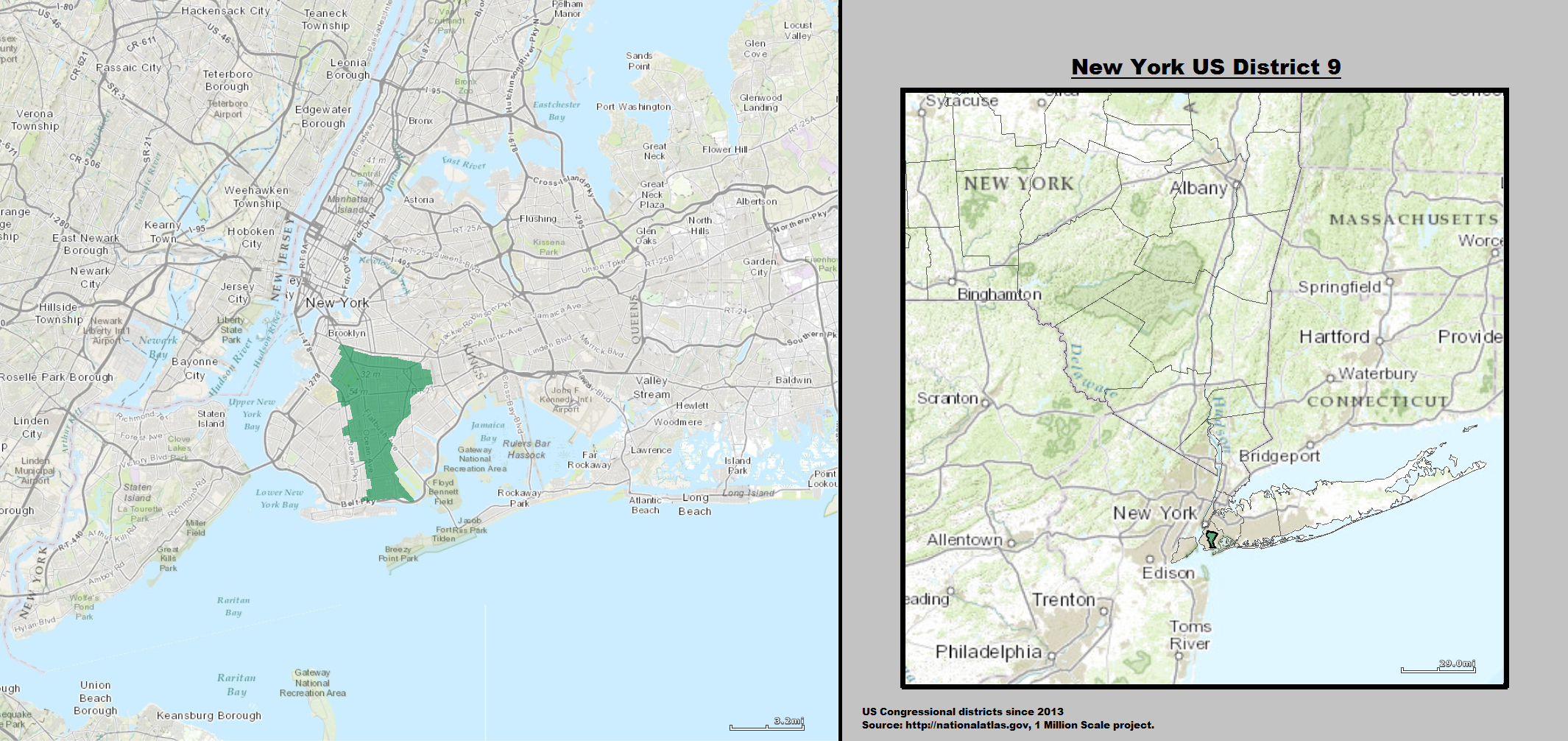
2013–2023

== Current composition ==
The 9th district is located entirely in the New York City borough of Brooklyn. Brooklyn neighborhoods in the district include:

- Borough Park
- Crown Heights
- Ditmas Park
- East Flatbush
- Erasmus
- Farragut
- Flatbush
- Flatlands
- Kensington
- Madison
- Mapleton
- Midwood
- Parkville
- Prospect Lefferts Gardens
- Remsen Village
- Rugby
- Wingate

== List of members representing the district ==
Member	Party	Years	Cong ress	Electoral history	District location
District established March 4, 1793
James Gordon (Schenectady)	Pro-Administration	March 4, 1793 – March 3, 1795	3rd	Redistricted from the 6th district and re-elected in 1793. Retired.	
John Williams (Salem)	Democratic-Republican	March 4, 1795 – March 3, 1797	4th 5th	Elected in 1794. Re-elected in 1796. Redistricted to the 7th district and lost re-election.	
John Williams (Salem)	Federalist	March 4, 1797 – March 3, 1799	4th 5th	Elected in 1794. Re-elected in 1796. Redistricted to the 7th district and lost re-election.	
Jonas Platt (Poughkeepsie)	Federalist	March 4, 1799 – March 3, 1801	6th	Elected in 1798. Retired.	
Benjamin Walker (Utica)	Federalist	March 4, 1801 – March 3, 1803	7th	Elected in 1800. Retired.	
Killian K. Van Rensselaer (Albany)	Federalist	March 4, 1803 – March 3, 1809	8th 9th 10th	Redistricted from the 8th district and re-elected in 1802. Re-elected in 1804. Re-elected in 1806. Redistricted to the 7th district.	
Thomas Sammons (Johnstown)	Federalist	March 4, 1809 – March 3, 1811	11th 12th	Elected in 1808. Re-elected in 1810. Retired.	
Thomas Sammons (Johnstown)	Democratic-Republican	March 4, 1811 – March 3, 1813	11th 12th	Elected in 1808. Re-elected in 1810. Retired.	
John Lovett (Albany)	Federalist	March 4, 1813 – March 3, 1817	13th 14th	Elected in 1812. Re-elected in 1814. Retired.	
Rensselaer Westerlo (Albany)	Federalist	March 4, 1817 – March 3, 1819	15th	Elected in 1816. Retired.	
Solomon Van Rensselaer (Albany)	Federalist	March 4, 1819 – January 14, 1822	16th 17th	Elected in 1818. Re-elected in 1821. Resigned to become postmaster of Albany.	
Vacant		January 14, 1822 – March 12, 1822	17th		
Stephen Van Rensselaer (Albany)	Federalist	March 12, 1822 – March 3, 1823	17th	Elected to finish his cousin's term. Redistricted to the 10th district.	
James L. Hogeboom (Castleton)	Crawford; Republican	March 4, 1823 – March 3, 1825	18th	Elected in 1822. Retired.	
William McManus (Troy)	Anti-Jacksonian	March 4, 1825 – March 3, 1827	19th	Elected in 1824. Lost re-election.	
John D. Dickinson (Troy)	Anti-Jacksonian	March 4, 1827 – March 3, 1831	20th 21st	Elected in 1826. Re-elected in 1828. Lost re-election.	
Job Pierson (Schaghticoke)	Jacksonian	March 4, 1831 – March 3, 1835	22nd 23rd	Elected in 1830. Re-elected in 1832. Lost re-election.	
Hiram P. Hunt (Troy)	Anti-Jacksonian	March 4, 1835 – March 3, 1837	24th	Elected in 1834. Lost re-election.	
Henry Vail (Troy)	Democratic	March 4, 1837 – March 3, 1839	25th	Elected in 1836. Lost re-election.	
Hiram P. Hunt (Troy)	Whig	March 4, 1839 – March 3, 1843	26th 27th	Elected in 1838. Re-elected in 1840. Lost re-election.	
James G. Clinton (Newburgh)	Democratic	March 4, 1843 – March 3, 1845	28th	Redistricted from the 6th district and re-elected in 1842. Retired.	
Archibald C. Niven (Monticello)	Democratic	March 4, 1845 – March 3, 1847	29th	Elected in 1844. Retired.	
Daniel B. St. John (Monticello)	Whig	March 4, 1847 – March 3, 1849	30th	Elected in 1846. Retired.	
Thomas McKissock (Newburgh)	Whig	March 4, 1849 – March 3, 1851	31st	Elected in 1848. Lost re-election.	
William Murray (Goshen)	Democratic	March 4, 1851 – March 3, 1853	32nd	Elected in 1850. Redistricted to the 10th district.	
Jared V. Peck (Port Chester)	Democratic	March 4, 1853 – March 3, 1855	33rd	Elected in 1852. Retired.	
Bayard Clarke (New York)	Opposition	March 4, 1855 – March 3, 1857	34th	Elected in 1854. Declined renomination as a Republican.	
John B. Haskin (Fordham)	Democratic	March 4, 1857 – March 3, 1859	35th 36th	Elected in 1856. Re-elected in 1858. Retired.	
John B. Haskin (Fordham)	Anti-Lecompton; Democratic	March 4, 1859 – March 3, 1861	35th 36th	Elected in 1856. Re-elected in 1858. Retired.	
Edward Haight (Westchester)	Democratic	March 4, 1861 – March 3, 1863	37th	Elected in 1860. Lost re-election.	
Anson Herrick (New York)	Democratic	March 4, 1863 – March 3, 1865	38th	Elected in 1862. Lost re-election.	
William A. Darling (New York)	Republican	March 4, 1865 – March 3, 1867	39th	Elected in 1864. Lost re-election.	
Fernando Wood (New York)	Democratic	March 4, 1867 – March 3, 1873	40th 41st 42nd	Elected in 1866. Re-elected in 1868. Re-elected in 1870. Redistricted to the 10th district.	
David B. Mellish (New York)	Republican	March 4, 1873 – May 23, 1874	43rd	Elected in 1872. Died.	
Vacant		May 23, 1874 – December 7, 1874	43rd		
Richard Schell (New York)	Democratic	December 7, 1874 – March 3, 1875	43rd	Elected to finish Mellish's term. Retired.	
Fernando Wood (New York)	Democratic	March 4, 1875 – February 14, 1881	44th 45th 46th	Redistricted from the 10th district and re-elected in 1874. Re-elected in 1876. Re-elected in 1878. Re-elected in 1880. Died.	
Vacant		February 14, 1881 – December 5, 1881	46th 47th		
John Hardy (New York)	Democratic	December 5, 1881 – March 3, 1885	47th 48th	Elected to finish Wood's term. Re-elected in 1882. Lost renomination.	
Joseph Pulitzer (New York)	Democratic	March 4, 1885 – April 10, 1886	49th	Elected in 1884. Resigned.	
Vacant		April 10, 1886 – November 2, 1886	49th		
Samuel S. Cox (New York)	Democratic	November 2, 1886 – September 10, 1889	49th 50th 51st	Elected to finish Pulitzer's term. Re-elected in 1886. Re-elected in 1888. Died.	
Vacant		September 10, 1889 – November 5, 1889	51st		
Amos J. Cummings (New York)	Democratic	November 5, 1889 – March 3, 1893	51st 52nd	Elected to finish Cox's term. Re-elected in 1890. Redistricted to the 11th district.	
Timothy J. Campbell (New York)	Democratic	March 4, 1893 – March 3, 1895	53rd	Redistricted from the 8th district and re-elected in 1892. [data missing]	
Henry C. Miner (New York)	Democratic	March 4, 1895 – March 3, 1897	54th	Elected in 1894. Retired.	
Thomas J. Bradley (New York)	Democratic	March 4, 1897 – March 3, 1901	55th 56th	Elected in 1896. Re-elected in 1898. Retired.	
Henry M. Goldfogle (New York)	Democratic	March 4, 1901 – March 3, 1913	57th 58th 59th 60th 61st 62nd	Elected in 1900. Re-elected in 1902. Re-elected in 1904. Re-elected in 1906. Re-elected in 1908. Re-elected in 1910. Redistricted to the 12th district.	
James H. O'Brien (Brooklyn)	Democratic	March 4, 1913 – March 3, 1915	63rd	Elected in 1912. Lost re-election.	
Oscar W. Swift (Brooklyn)	Republican	March 4, 1915 – March 3, 1919	64th 65th	Elected in 1914. Re-elected in 1916. Lost re-election.	
David J. O'Connell (Brooklyn)	Democratic	March 4, 1919 – March 3, 1921	66th	Elected in 1918. Lost re-election.	
Andrew Petersen (Brooklyn)	Republican	March 4, 1921 – March 3, 1923	67th	Elected in 1920. Lost re-election.	
David J. O'Connell (Brooklyn)	Democratic	March 4, 1923 – December 29, 1930	68th 69th 70th 71st	Elected in 1922. Re-elected in 1924. Re-elected in 1926. Re-elected in 1928. Re-elected in 1930. Died.	
Vacant		December 29, 1930 – February 17, 1931	71st		
Stephen A. Rudd (Brooklyn)	Democratic	February 17, 1931 – March 31, 1936	71st 72nd 73rd 74th	Elected to finish O'Connell's term. Re-elected in 1932. Re-elected in 1934. Died.	
Vacant		March 31, 1936 – January 3, 1937	74th		
Eugene J. Keogh (Brooklyn)	Democratic	January 3, 1937 – January 3, 1963	75th 76th 77th 78th 79th 80th 81st 82nd 83rd 84th 85th 86th 87th	Elected in 1936. Re-elected in 1938. Re-elected in 1940. Re-elected in 1942. Re-elected in 1944. Re-elected in 1946. Re-elected in 1948. Re-elected in 1950. Re-elected in 1952. Re-elected in 1954. Re-elected in 1956. Re-elected in 1958. Re-elected in 1960. Redistricted to the 11th district.	
James J. Delaney (Queens)	Democratic	January 3, 1963 – December 31, 1978	88th 89th 90th 91st 92nd 93rd 94th 95th	Redistricted from the 7th district and re-elected in 1962. Re-elected in 1964. Re-elected in 1966. Re-elected in 1968. Re-elected in 1970. Re-elected in 1972. Re-elected in 1974. Re-elected in 1976. Resigned.	
Vacant		January 1, 1979 – January 3, 1979	95th		
Geraldine Ferraro (Queens)	Democratic	January 3, 1979 – January 3, 1985	96th 97th 98th	Elected in 1978. Re-elected in 1980. Re-elected in 1982. Retired to run for U.S. Vice President.	
Thomas J. Manton (Queens)	Democratic	January 3, 1985 – January 3, 1993	99th 100th 101st 102nd	Elected in 1984. Re-elected in 1986. Re-elected in 1988. Re-elected in 1990. Redistricted to the 7th district.	
Chuck Schumer (Brooklyn)	Democratic	January 3, 1993 – January 3, 1999	103rd 104th 105th	Redistricted from the 10th district and re-elected in 1992. Re-elected in 1994. Re-elected in 1996. Retired to run for U.S. senator.	1993–2003; Parts of Brooklyn, Queens
Anthony Weiner (Brooklyn)	Democratic	January 3, 1999 – June 21, 2011	106th 107th 108th 109th 110th 111th 112th	Elected in 1998. Re-elected in 2000. Re-elected in 2002. Re-elected in 2004. Re-elected in 2006. Re-elected in 2008. Re-elected in 2010. Resigned.	1993–2003; Parts of Brooklyn, Queens
Anthony Weiner (Brooklyn)	Democratic	January 3, 1999 – June 21, 2011	106th 107th 108th 109th 110th 111th 112th	Elected in 1998. Re-elected in 2000. Re-elected in 2002. Re-elected in 2004. Re-elected in 2006. Re-elected in 2008. Re-elected in 2010. Resigned.	2003–2013; Parts of Brooklyn, Queens
Vacant		June 21, 2011 – September 15, 2011	112th		2003–2013; Parts of Brooklyn, Queens
Robert Turner (Queens)	Republican	September 15, 2011 – January 3, 2013	112th	Elected to finish Weiner's term. Redistricted to the 5th district but retired to run for U.S. senator.	2003–2013; Parts of Brooklyn, Queens
Yvette Clarke (Brooklyn)	Democratic	January 3, 2013 – present	113th 114th 115th 116th 117th 118th 119th	Redistricted from the 11th district and re-elected in 2012. Re-elected in 2014. Re-elected in 2016. Re-elected in 2018. Re-elected in 2020. Re-elected in 2022. Re-elected in 2024. Re-elected in 2026.	2013–2023; Parts of Brooklyn
Yvette Clarke (Brooklyn)	Democratic	January 3, 2013 – present	113th 114th 115th 116th 117th 118th 119th	Redistricted from the 11th district and re-elected in 2012. Re-elected in 2014. Re-elected in 2016. Re-elected in 2018. Re-elected in 2020. Re-elected in 2022. Re-elected in 2024. Re-elected in 2026.	2023–2025; Parts of Brooklyn
Yvette Clarke (Brooklyn)	Democratic	January 3, 2013 – present	113th 114th 115th 116th 117th 118th 119th	Redistricted from the 11th district and re-elected in 2012. Re-elected in 2014. Re-elected in 2016. Re-elected in 2018. Re-elected in 2020. Re-elected in 2022. Re-elected in 2024. Re-elected in 2026.	2025–present Parts of Brooklyn

== Recent election results ==
In New York elections, there are minor parties. Certain parties will invariably endorse either the Republican or Democratic candidate for every office; hence, the state electoral results contain both the party votes, and the final candidate votes (listed as "Recap").

- [data missing]

US House election, 1984: New York District 9
Party	Candidate	Votes	%	±%
Democratic	Thomas J. Manton	71,420	52.8	
Republican	Serphin R. Maltese	63,910	47.2	
Majority		7,510	5.6	
Turnout		135,330	100	

US House election, 1996: New York District 9
Party	Candidate	Votes	%	±%
Democratic	Charles E. Schumer (incumbent)	107,107	74.8	
Republican	Robert J. Verga	30,488	21.3	
Conservative	Michael Mossa	5,618	3.9	
Majority		76,619	53.5	
Turnout		143,213	100	

US House election, 1998: New York District 9
Party	Candidate	Votes	%	±%
Democratic	Anthony D. Weiner	69,439	66.4	−8.4
Republican	Louis Telano	24,486	23.4	+2.1
Liberal	Melinda Katz	5,698	5.5	+5.5
Conservative	Arthur J. Smith	4,899	4.7	+0.8
Majority		44,953	43.0	−10.5
Turnout		104,522	100	−27.0

US House election, 2000: New York District 9
Party	Candidate	Votes	%	±%
Democratic	Anthony D. Weiner (incumbent)	98,983	68.4	+2.0
Republican	Noach Dear	45,649	31.6	+8.2
Majority		53,334	36.9	−6.1
Turnout		144,632	100	+38.4

US House election, 2002: New York District 9
Party	Candidate	Votes	%	±%
Democratic	Anthony D. Weiner (incumbent)	60,737	65.7	−2.7
Republican	Alfred F. Donohue	31,698	34.3	+2.7
Majority		29,039	31.4	−5.5
Turnout		92,435	100	−36.1

US House election, 2004: New York District 9
Party	Candidate	Votes	%	±%
Democratic	Anthony D. Weiner (incumbent)	113,025	71.3	+5.6
Republican	Gerard J. Cronin	45,451	28.7	−5.6
Majority		67,574	42.6	+11.2
Turnout		158,476	100	+71.4

US House election, 2006: New York District 9
Party	Candidate	Votes	%	±%
Democratic	Anthony D. Weiner (incumbent)	71,762	100	+28.7
Majority		71,762	100	+57.4
Turnout		71,762	100	−54.7

US House election, 2008: New York District 9
Party	Candidate	Votes	%	±%
Democratic	Anthony D. Weiner (incumbent)	112,205	93.1	−6.9
Conservative	Alfred F. Donohue	8,378	6.9	+6.9
Majority		103,827	86.2	−13.8
Turnout		120,583	100	+68.0

US House election, 2010: New York District 9
Party	Candidate	Votes	%	±%
Democratic	Anthony D. Weiner (incumbent)	67,011	60.8	−32.3
Republican	Bob Turner	43,129	39.2	+39.2
Majority		23,882	21.6	−64.6
Turnout		110,140	100	−8.7
Democratic hold				

US House special election, 2011: New York District 9
Party	Candidate	Votes	%
Republican	Bob Turner	37,342	51.72
Democratic	David Weprin	33,656	46.62
Socialist Workers	Chris Hoeppner	143	0.2
Write-In Votes	Multiple (49 Names)	1,056	1.46
Total votes		72,197	100
Republican gain from Democratic			

US House election, 2018: New York District 9
Party	Candidate	Votes	%
Democratic	Yvette D. Clarke (incumbent)	181,455	89.3
Republican	Lutchi Gayot	20,901	10.3
Reform	Joel Anabilah-Azumah	779	0.4
Majority			
Turnout		203,135	100.0

US House election, 2020: New York District 9
Party	Candidate	Votes	%
Democratic	Yvette Clarke	195,758	70.7
Working Families	Yvette Clarke	34,463	12.4
Total	Yvette Clarke (incumbent)	230,221	83.1
Republican	Constantin Jean-Pierre	40,110	14.5
Conservative	Constantin Jean-Pierre	3,840	1.4
Total	Constantin Jean-Pierre	43,950	15.9
Libertarian	Gary Popkin	1,644	0.6
SAM	Joel Azumah	1,052	0.4
Total votes		276,867	100.0
Democratic hold			

US House election, 2022: New York District 9
Party	Candidate	Votes	%
Democratic	Yvette Clarke	99,771	69.36%
Working Families	Yvette Clarke	17,199	11.96%
Total	Yvette Clarke (incumbent)	116,970	81.31%
Conservative	Menachem Raitport	26,521	18.44%
Write-in		362	0.25%
Total votes		143,853	100%

US House election, 2024: New York District 9
Party	Candidate	Votes	%
Democratic	Yvette Clarke (incumbent)	173,207	74.3
Republican	Menachem Raitport	51,458	22.0
Conservative	Menachem Raitport	8,606	3.7
Total	Menachem Raitport	60,064	25.7
Total votes		233,271	100.0
Democratic hold			

== See also ==
- List of United States congressional districts
- New York's congressional delegations
- New York's congressional districts
