= Andrew Petersen =

American politician (1870–1953)

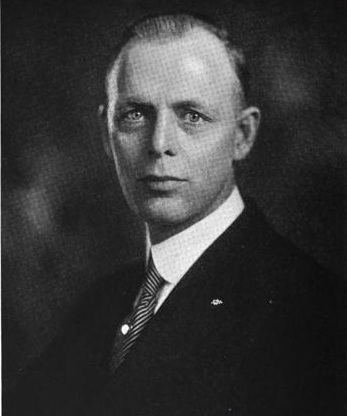

Member of the U.S. House of Representatives from New York's 9th district
- In office March 4, 1921 – March 3, 1923
- Preceded by: David J. O'Connell
- Succeeded by: David J. O'Connell

Personal details
- Born: Andrew Nicholas Petersen; March 10, 1870 near Thisted, Denmark
- Died: September 28, 1953 (aged 83) East Rockaway, New York
- Party: Republican
- Occupation: Patternmaker; Foundry company executive

Andrew Nicholas Petersen (March 10, 1870 – September 28, 1953) was a patternmaker and foundry company executive who served as a U.S. representative from New York.

== Early life ==
Born near Thisted, Denmark, Petersen immigrated to the United States in 1873 with his parents, Tyler and Hansine (Furst) Petersen. They settled first in Boston before moving to New York City in 1879. He attended the public schools and learned the patternmaker's trade.

== Business career ==
Petersen later became an executive in the metal working industry, and served as president of Brooklyn's Whale Creek Iron Works. In addition, Petersen was an officer and member of the board of governors of the Employers' Association of Architectural Iron Workers. He was also active in a real estate sales and development company, Farragut Realty. In 1897, he invented an iron staircase for tenement houses, for which he received a patent. Petersen served as president of the Brooklyn Foundry Company from 1900 to 1952. His companies were active in construction throughout the New York City area, including fulfilling contracts for elevator fronts, staircases, railings, columns, building fronts, and other building components.

== Election to Congress ==
Petersen was elected as a Republican to the Sixty-seventh Congress (March 4, 1921 – March 3, 1923). He was an unsuccessful candidate for reelection in 1922 to the Sixty-eighth Congress. In 1924, he was the unsuccessful Republican nominee for the Congressional seat he had previously held.

== Panama incident ==
In 1923, President Warren G. Harding, and Edwin Denby, the Secretary of the Navy, requested that Petersen and another former Republican Congressman from New York, Albert B. Rossdale travel to the Panama Canal Zone to make firsthand observations on living and working conditions for Navy sailors, and make recommendations for improvements. Intending to conduct their investigation undercover, Petersen and Rossdale joined the crew of the battleship USS New York, donned sailors' uniforms, had dinner with the crew, and then departed with them for shore leave. Upon entering a Panamanian cabaret, they were arrested by members of the Navy shore patrol and charged with being at liberty after 11 PM, in violation of Naval regulations. They remained in detention until they revealed their identities and the captain of the New York wired the shore patrol instructions to release Petersen and Rossdale. Rather than the planned undercover operation, the investigation Rossdale and Petersen intended degenerated into farce; when the media became aware of the events, they generated satirical headlines that showed the principals and the Harding administration in a negative light.

== Death and burial ==
Peterson died in East Rockaway, New York on September 28, 1953. He was buried in Cypress Hills Abbey, Brooklyn, New York.

== Family ==
In 1896, Petersen married to Olga E. Holck. They were the parents of three children, daughter Shirley M., and sons Harry E. and Elliott I. Harry Petersen succeeded his father as president of the Brooklyn Foundry Company. Elliott Petersen was vice president of production for the Bigelow-Sanford Carpet Company.

== Sources ==
=== Books ===
- Duer, Stephen C.; Smith, Allan B. (2010). Images of America: Cypress Hills Cemetery. Charleston, SC: Arcadia Publishing. ISBN 978-0-7385-7343-4.
- Leonard, John W. (1907). Who's Who in New York City and State. New York, NY: L. R. Hammersly & Company. p. 1037.
- Stone, Kurt F. (2011). The Jews of Capitol Hill: A Compendium of Jewish Congressional Members. Lanham, MD: Scarecrow Press. ISBN 978-0-8108-5731-5.

=== Newspapers ===
- "Andrew M. Petersen, Boro member of 67th Congress". Brooklyn Daily Eagle. Brooklyn, NY. September 30, 1953. (Note: Headline and article give incorrect middle initial.)

=== Magazines ===
- Crossett, Frederick M. (February 1, 1905). "Profile, Andrew N. Petersen". Building Trades Employers' Association Bulletin. New York, NY: New York Building Trades Employers' Association.

== External sources ==
- United States Congress. "Andrew Petersen (id: P000257)". Biographical Directory of the United States Congress.

U.S. House of Representatives
Preceded by David J. O'Connell	Member of the U.S. House of Representatives from New York's 9th congressional district March 4, 1921 – March 3, 1923	Succeeded by David J. O'Connell
