= William Augustus Darling =

American politician (1817–1895)

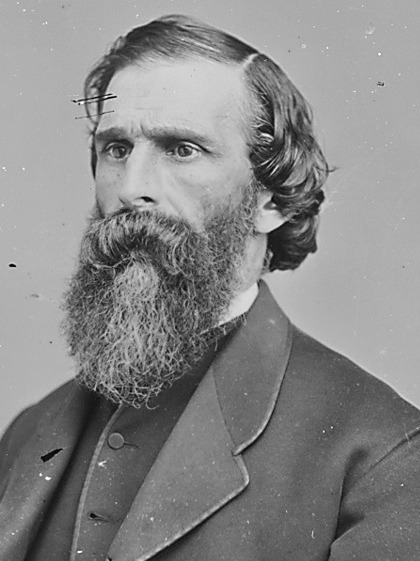

Member of the U.S. House of Representatives from New York's 9th district
- In office March 4, 1865 – March 3, 1867
- Preceded by: Anson Herrick
- Succeeded by: Fernando Wood

Personal details
- Born: December 27, 1817 Newark, New Jersey
- Died: May 26, 1895 (aged 77) New York City, New York
- Party: Republican

William Augustus Darling (December 27, 1817 – May 26, 1895) was a U.S. representative from New York.

== Biography ==
Darling was born in Newark, New Jersey, and attended the local schools. He moved to New York City, where he was employed as a clerk and became involved in the wholesale grocery business. He also served as director of the Mercantile Library Association.

In addition to his business career, Darling served as a private and officer in the New York National Guard's 7th Regiment for eleven years.

From 1847 to 1854 Darling served as New York City's deputy receiver of taxes. He served as president of the Third Avenue Railroad from 1854 to 1865. Active in the Republican from its inception, Darling was a presidential elector in 1860; the Republicans carried New York, and Darling cast his ballot for the ticket of Abraham Lincoln and Hannibal Hamlin.

In 1864, Darling was elected as a Republican to the Thirty-ninth Congress (March 4, 1865 - March 3, 1867). He was an unsuccessful candidate for reelection in 1866 to the Fortieth Congress, and an unsuccessful candidate for mayor in 1866.

Darling served as federal collector of internal revenue for the ninth district of New York from April 26, 1869, to April 17, 1871, and as a federal customs appraiser from April 18, 1871, to April 1, 1876. He also became active in banking, and served as president of the Murray Hill Bank.

He died in New York City May 26, 1895, and was interred in Trinity Church Cemetery.

U.S. House of Representatives
Preceded by Anson Herrick	Member of the U.S. House of Representatives from New York's 9th congressional district 1865–1867	Succeeded by Fernando Wood
