= James H. O'Brien =

American politician

Homer James O’Brien
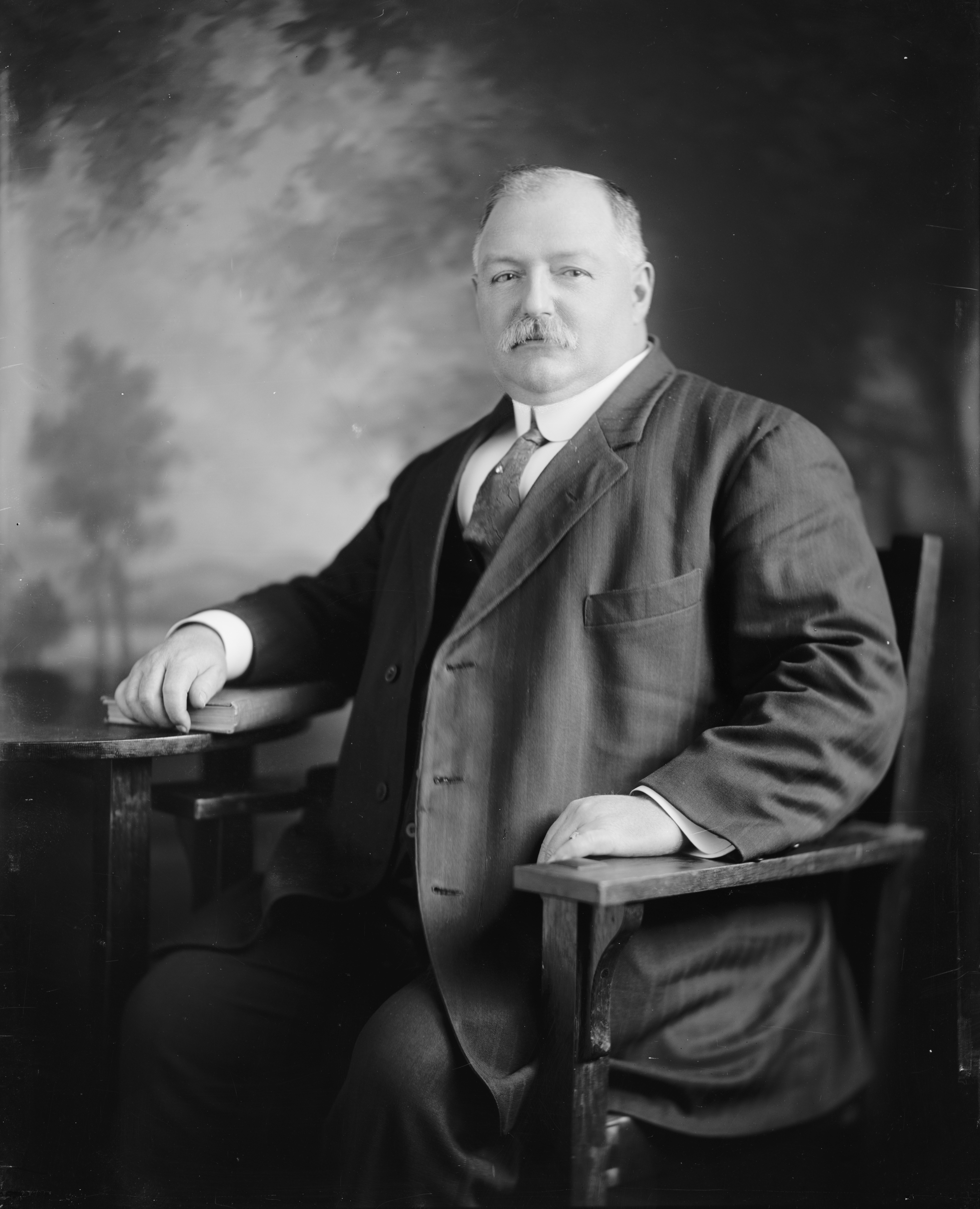

Member of the U.S. House of Representatives from New York's 9th district
- In office March 4, 1913 – March 3, 1915
- Preceded by: Henry M. Goldfogle
- Succeeded by: Oscar W. Swift

Member of the New York State Senate
- In office January 1, 1911 – December 31, 1912

Personal details
- Born: James Henry O’Brien; July 15, 1860 Jamaica, U.S.
- Died: September 2, 1924 (aged 64) Brooklyn, New York
- Resting place: Holy Cross Cemetery
- Party: Democratic
- Spouse: Catherine “Kate” Lyons
- Profession: Politician

James Henry O'Brien (July 15, 1860 – September 2, 1924 in Brooklyn) was an American politician from New York. A Democrat, he served terms in the New York State Senate from 1911 to 1912, and in the United States House of Representatives for one term from 1913 to 1915.

== Early life and education ==
O'Brien was born in Jamaica, Queens County, New York on July 15, 1860. He attended the public schools in Queens, and graduated from Browne's Business College in Brooklyn.

== Business career ==
He became a resident of the town of East New York, which was later incorporated into the city of Brooklyn. O'Brien worked as a machinist and mechanical engineer, and later owned and operated the J. H. O'Brien Scale & Supply Company, a business that manufactured commercial scales and equipment used in constructing overhead tramways.

== Political career ==
=== State Senate ===
O'Brien became active in politics as a Democrat. He was a member of the New York State Senate (10th D.) in 1911 and 1912. While in the Senate, he served as chairman of the Agriculture Committee, and was chairman of the state's Food Investigating Commission.

=== Congress ===
O'Brien was elected as a Democrat to the 63rd United States Congress, and served from March 4, 1913, to March 3, 1915. He was an unsuccessful candidate for reelection in 1914.

== Later career and death ==
After leaving Congress, O'Brien resumed management of his business interests. He served as a delegate to the Democratic National Convention in 1916. He died in Brooklyn on September 2, 1924, and was buried at Holy Cross Cemetery.

== Family ==
O'Brien was married to Catherine "Kate" Lyons. They were the parents of four sons and three daughters; William, James, Thomas, Edward, Geraldine, Anna, and Estelle.

== Sources ==
=== Newspapers ===
- "Delegates Elected". New York Times. New York, NY. April 5, 1916.
- "J. H. O'Brien, Dies, Ex-Congressman". Brooklyn Daily Eagle. Brooklyn, NY. September 3, 1924.

== External sources ==
- United States Congress. "James H. O'Brien (id: O000012)". Biographical Directory of the United States Congress.

New York State Senate
Preceded by Charles Alt	New York State Senate; 10th District; 1911–1912	Succeeded by Herman H. Torborg
U.S. House of Representatives
Preceded by Henry M. Goldfogle	Member of the U.S. House of Representatives from New York's 9th congressional district 1913–1915	Succeeded by Oscar W. Swift
