= John B. Haskin =

American politician (1821–1895)

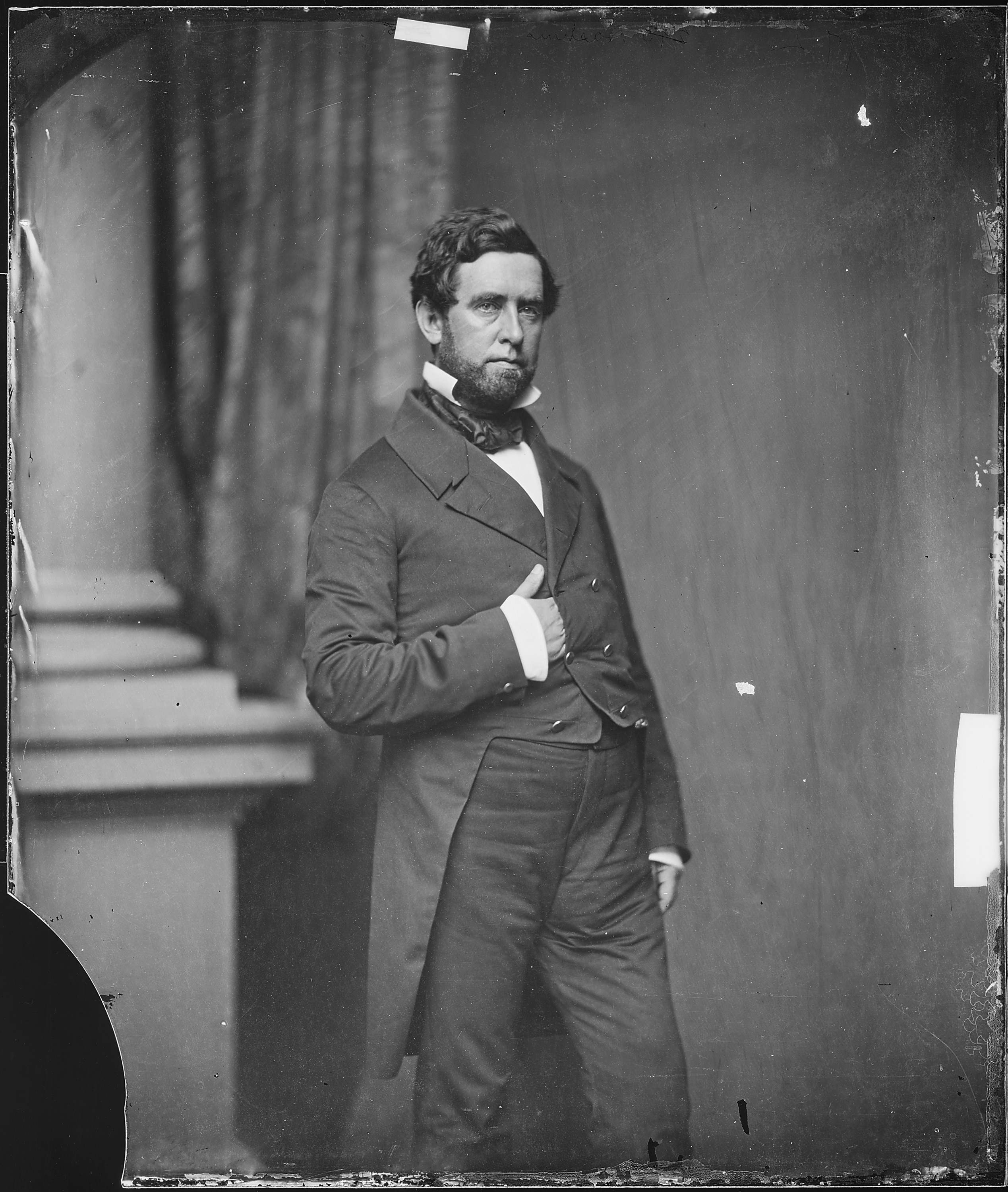

Member of the U.S. House of Representatives from New York's 9th district
- In office March 4, 1857 – March 3, 1861
- Preceded by: Bayard Clarke
- Succeeded by: Edward Haight

Personal details
- Born: John Bussing Haskin; August 27, 1821 New York City, U.S.
- Died: September 18, 1895 (aged 74) Chestertown, New York, U.S.
- Resting place: Woodlawn Cemetery, New York City, U.S.
- Party: Democratic
- Profession: Politician, lawyer

John Bussing Haskin (August 27, 1821 – September 18, 1895) was an American lawyer and politician who served two terms as a U.S. representative from New York from 1857 to 1861.

== Biography ==
Born in Fordham, Bronx, New York, Haskin attended the public schools. He studied law, was admitted to the bar in 1843 and commenced practice in New York City.

=== Political career ===
In 1847, he elected a Civil Justice of New York City, serving on the bench until the office was abolished in 1849.

He subsequently relocated to the Bronx. When West Farms was incorporated, he served as Town Supervisor from 1850 to 1851 and 1857 to 1860, and he was the town's Corporation Counsel from 1853 to 1856.

=== Tenure in Congress ===
Haskin was elected as a Democrat to the Thirty-fifth Congress and re-elected as an Anti-Lecompton Democrat to the Thirty-sixth Congress, serving from March 4, 1857, to March 3, 1861. During his tenure, he served as Chairman of the Committee on Expenditures in the Department of the Navy (Thirty-fifth Congress) and the Committee on Public Expenditures (Thirty-sixth Congress).

=== Later career and death ===
After leaving Congress, Haskin resumed practicing law, and was elected to another term as Town Supervisor in 1863.

Haskin died at Friends Lake in Chestertown, New York, on September 18, 1895. He was interred in Woodlawn Cemetery.

U.S. House of Representatives
| Preceded by Bayard Clarke | Member of the U.S. House of Representatives from New York's 9th congressional district March 4, 1857 – March 3, 1861 | Succeeded by Edward Haight |
