= W. Chudley =

English businessperson and social reformer (1838–1919)

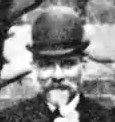
- Chudley in 1891
- Born: William Chudley; 1838; Exeter, England
- Died: 25 May 1919 (aged 81); Exeter, England
- Resting place: Exeter Higher Cemetery; 50.72894°N 3.50838°W
- Occupations: Businessperson; deacon; social reformer
- Years active: c. 1859–1919
- Organizations: Exeter Total Abstinence Society; Devon County Vegetarian Society
- Known for: Advocacy of temperance and vegetarianism
- Spouse: Jane Ramster (m. 1868; died 1912)
- Children: 1

William Chudley (1838 – 25 May 1919) was an English businessperson, deacon, and social reformer. He operated a printing and stationary business in Exeter for over 60 years and served as a Baptist deacon for around 40 years at the South Street Baptist Church. Chudley was an advocate of temperance and vegetarianism. He was a founding member of the Exeter Total Abstinence Society and Devon County Vegetarian Society.

== Biography ==
=== Early life ===
William Chudley was born in the second quarter of 1838 in Exeter to John Chudley and Mary Chudley (née Wonnacott). He was baptised on 8 July 1838 at the Church of St Mary Major, Exeter.

=== Career ===
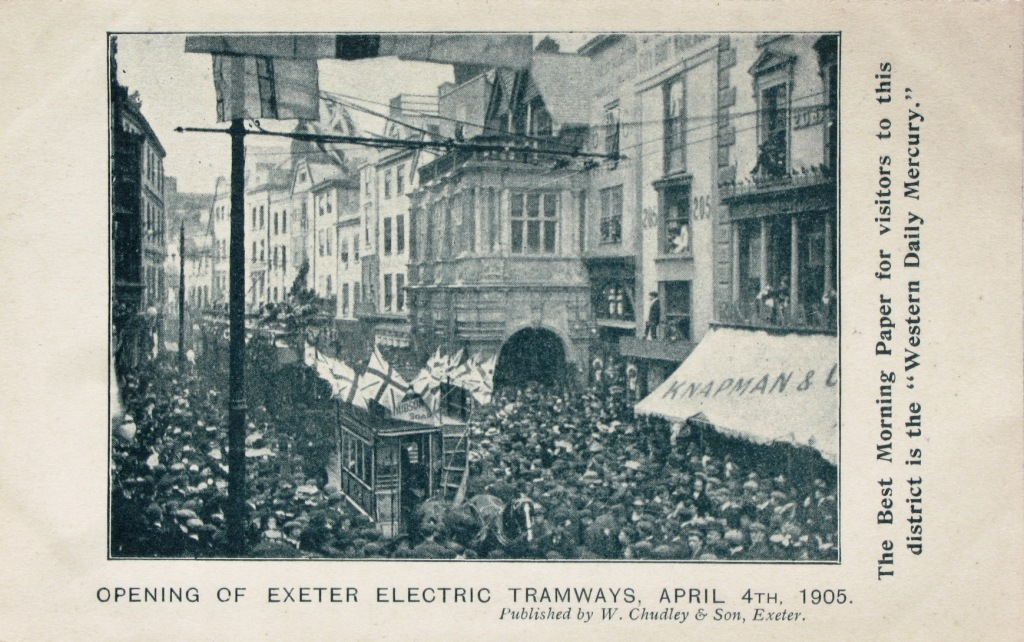
1905 postcard published by W. Chudley & Son

For over 60 years, Chudley operated the printing and stationery company W. Chudley & Son, in Exeter. He was also the director of the Eastgate Coffee Tavern.

A devout Baptist, Chudley served as a deacon for around 40 years at the South Street Baptist Church. Additionally, he was a member of the Board of Guardians for St. Mary Major's Ward and participated in the governing body of the Royal Devon and Exeter Hospital. He ran unsuccessfully for Exeter City Council on three occasions.

=== Social reform ===
Chudley was a founding member of the Exeter Total Abstinence Society and served as honorary secretary.

In 1869, Chudley published The Weekly Marvel, a publication devoted to temperance propaganda, which lasted for about a year.

In 1882, after attending two lectures on vegetarianism by Dr. T. L. Nichols, Chudley formed the Devon County Vegetarian Society along with J. I. Pengelly. Chudley served on the committee, while Pengelly served as honorary secretary and treasurer.

=== Personal life and death ===
Chudley married Jane Ramster on 8 April 1868 at the Independent Chapel, Castle Street, Exeter. They had one son, A. J. Chudley. His wife died in 1912.

Chudley died on 25 May 1919 in Exeter, aged 81, following a ten-day illness caused by bronchial pneumonia. He was buried at Exeter Higher Cemetery on 30 May. His son took over the business following his father's death.

== See also ==
- History of vegetarianism
- Vegetarianism in the Victorian era
- Temperance movement in the United Kingdom
