= Stephen A. Rudd =

American politician

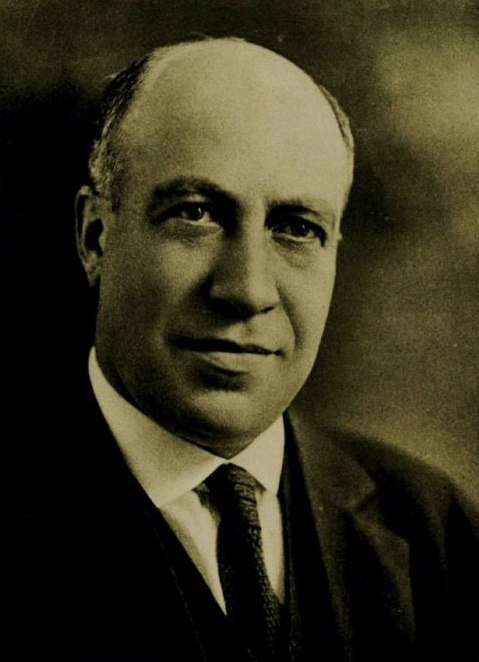

Member of the U.S. House of Representatives from New York's 9th district
- In office February 17, 1931 – March 31, 1936
- Preceded by: David J. O'Connell
- Succeeded by: Eugene James Keogh

Member of the New York City Board of Aldermen
- In office January 2, 1922 – March 2, 1931
- Preceded by: John Moehringer
- Succeeded by: Henry C. Bauer
- Constituency: 54th District

Personal details
- Born: Stephen Andrew Rudd; December 11, 1874 Brooklyn, New York, U.S.
- Died: March 31, 1936 (aged 61) Brooklyn, New York, U.S.
- Resting place: Cemetery of the Evergreens, Brooklyn, New York, U.S.
- Party: Democratic
- Spouse(s): Elizabeth Lindsay (m. 1895); Martha Lindsay (m. 1926)
- Children: 4 (including Roy H. Rudd)
- Relatives: George W. Lindsay (brother-in-law); George H. Lindsay (father-in-law)
- Education: Brooklyn Law School
- Profession: Attorney

Stephen Andrew Rudd (December 11, 1874 – March 31, 1936) was an American attorney and politician. He served as a member of the United States House of Representatives for New York's 9th congressional district from 1931 to 1936.

== Early life ==
Stephen A. Rudd was born in Brooklyn, New York on December 11, 1874, the son of Robert J. Rudd, who served in the New York State Assembly. He was educated in the public schools of Brooklyn and the New York Preparatory School.

== Start of career ==
In addition to becoming active in politics as a member of the Democratic Party, Rudd was a laborer in several Brooklyn businesses, including a ropewalk, a tin factory, and a horse blanket manufacturer. He later became active in several business ventures, including real estate and construction. He studied law, then attended Brooklyn Law School, from which he received his certificate of graduation in 1912. Rudd was admitted to the bar in 1914 and practiced law in Brooklyn. For several years, Rudd worked as a clerk and stenographer in the office of the Brooklyn District Attorney, a position that became the subject of prolonged litigation when Rudd unsuccessfully sued for wrongful termination. He later served as executive assistant to one of the New York City Police Department's deputy commissioners. From 1922 to 1931, Rudd was a member of the New York City Board of Aldermen.

== U.S. Representative ==
In 1931, Rudd was elected to the United States House of Representatives, filling the vacancy caused by the death of David J. O'Connell. He was re-elected three times, and served in the 71st, 72nd, 73rd and 74th United States Congresses, February 17, 1931 until his death.

== Death and burial ==
Rudd died in Brooklyn on March 31, 1936. He was buried at Cemetery of the Evergreens in Brooklyn.

== Family ==
In 1895, Rudd married Elizabeth Lindsay, who was the sister of Representative George W. Lindsay and daughter of Representative George H. Lindsay. They were the parents of four children: Martha, Stephen, Lindsay, and Roy. Roy H. Rudd served in the New York State Assembly from 1937 to 1946. In 1926, Rudd married Martha Lindsay, the sister of his first wife.

== See also ==
- List of members of the United States Congress who died in office (1900–1949)

U.S. House of Representatives
Preceded by David J. O'Connell	Member of the U.S. House of Representatives from New York's 9th congressional district 1931–1936	Succeeded by Eugene James Keogh
