= Thomas J. Bradley =

American politician (1870–1901)

Thomas Joseph Bradley
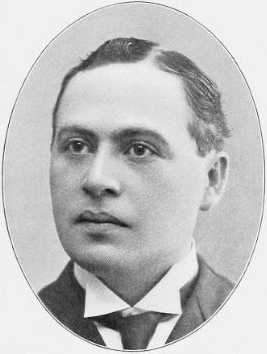

Member of the U.S. House of Representatives from New York's 9th district
- In office March 4, 1897 – March 3, 1901
- Preceded by: Henry C. Miner
- Succeeded by: Henry M. Goldfogle

Personal details
- Born: January 2, 1870 New York City, U.S.
- Died: April 1, 1901 (aged 31) New York City, U.S.
- Party: Democratic
- Education: University of New York City
- Profession: Lawyer, politician

Thomas Joseph Bradley (January 2, 1870 – April 1, 1901) was an American lawyer and politician who served two terms as a U.S. representative from New York at the turn of the 20th century.

== Biography ==
Born in New York City, Bradley attended the public schools and was graduated from the College of the City of New York in 1887. He taught in the public schools of New York City from 1887 until 1891 and was graduated from the law department of the university of New York City, in 1889. He was admitted to the bar in 1891 and commenced practice in New York City.

== Career ==
Bradley served as Deputy assistant district attorney of the county of New York from 1892 to 1895, then he resumed the practice of law.

=== Tenure in Congress ===
Elected as a Democrat to the Fifty-fifth Congress, winning with 56.84%; and Fifty-sixth Congress, winning with 46.27%; Bradley was United States Representative for the ninth district of New York from March 4, 1897, to March 3, 1901.

=== Retirement and death ===
Not a candidate for renomination in 1900, he then continued the practice of law until his death.

== Death ==
Bradley died from cirrhosis of the liver at St. Vincent's Hospital in Manhattan on April 1, 1901, age 31 years. He is interred at Calvary Cemetery, Woodside, Queens, New York.

U.S. House of Representatives
Preceded by Henry C. Miner	Member of the U.S. House of Representatives from New York's 9th congressional district March 4, 1897 – March 3, 1901	Succeeded by Henry M. Goldfogle
