= Oscar W. Swift =

American politician (1869–1940)

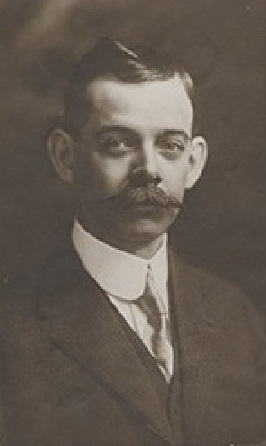

Member of the U.S. House of Representatives from New York's 9th district
- In office March 4, 1915 – March 3, 1919
- Preceded by: James H. O'Brien
- Succeeded by: David J. O'Connell

Personal details
- Born: Oscar William Swift; April 11, 1869 Little Falls, New York, U.S.
- Died: June 30, 1940 (aged 71) New York City, U.S.
- Resting place: Kensico Cemetery, Valhalla, New York, U.S.
- Party: Republican
- Education: University of Michigan; New York Law School
- Profession: Politician, lawyer

Oscar William Swift (April 11, 1869 – June 30, 1940) was an American attorney and politician who served as a U.S. representative from New York.

== Biography ==
Swift was born in Paines Hollow, New York on April 11, 1869, the son of Judson and Julia E. (Peters) Swift. His family subsequently moved to Michigan, where they settled in Adrian in 1877. He attended the public schools and the University of Michigan at Ann Arbor.

After deciding on a career in the law, Swift attended the New York Law School, from which he graduated in 1896. He was admitted to the bar in 1897 and commenced practice in New York City. In 1899, Swift married Jessie A. William of Brooklyn. They were the parents of four children: Dorothy, Harriet, Josephine, and Warren.

A Republican, Swift was elected as to the United States House of Representatives in 1914. He was reelected in 1916 and served in the 64th and 65th Congresses, March 4, 1915 to March 3, 1919. He was an unsuccessful candidate for reelection in 1918.

After leaving Congress, Swift resumed law practice in New York City and resided in Brooklyn. He died in Brooklyn on June 30, 1940. Swift was interred at Kensico Cemetery in Valhalla, New York.

== Sources ==
- United States Congress. "Oscar W. Swift (id: S001118)". Biographical Directory of the United States Congress.

U.S. House of Representatives
Preceded by James H. O'Brien	Member of the U.S. House of Representatives from New York's 9th congressional district 1915–1919	Succeeded by David J. O'Connell
