= The New York Aurora =

19th-century New York City newspaper

- Type: Daily newspaper
- Format: Four-page
- Owner(s): Anson Herrick; John F. Ropes
- Editor: Thomas Low Nichols (1841–1842); Walt Whitman (1842); Thomas Dunn English (1844)
- Founded: 1841
- Ceased publication: 1844
- Political alignment: Independent/Democratic; nativist
- Headquarters: New York City
- Country: United States
- Circulation: 5,000
- Price: Two cents
- OCLC number: 09321526

The New York Aurora was a short-lived 19th-century daily newspaper in New York City. It continued the Union and was itself continued in 1844 by the Daily Plebeian.

== History ==
Founded in 1841, the newspaper claimed to be politically independent but also "democratic, in the strongest sense of the word". The four-page, two-penny daily newspaper was owned by Anson Herrick and John F. Ropes and had a circulation of about 5,000. Its first editor was Thomas Low Nichols, who left by February 1842 after printing a libelous article.

Walt Whitman began contributing to the Aurora in February 1842; his first works in the publication are likely the series "Walks in Broadway". He was named the paper's editor on March 28, 1842. In his editorials, Whitman was open in expressing his personal opinions and beliefs and wrote about New York attractions and personalities, local theater and opera, and various happenings around the city. The Brooklyn Eagle praised the new editor as offering "marked change for the better" but noted "a dash of egotism" in him. In fact, owners Anson and Herrick accused Whitman of writing biased articles, including some that criticized Bishop John Hughes as "serpent tongued" and a "hypocritical scoundrel". Their quarrels led to Whitman leaving the Aurora in May 1842. Scholar Jason Stacy has described Whitman's articles for the Aurora as embracing "the tone of a knowing political observer and man-about-town" and as marked by his "struggl[ing] with the nativist sentiments brought out by the Maclay Bill controversy." Many of Whitman's editorial for the paper have been edited and republished by the Walt Whitman Archive.

By December 1844, editorship of the Aurora had passed to Thomas Dunn English, with the paper continuing its Democratic politics under Herrick and Ropes.

== Bibliography ==
- McMullen, Kevin, Stefan Schöberlein, and Jason Stacy. "Walt Whitman at the Aurora: A Model for Journalistic Attribution." Walt Whitman Quarterly Review 37 (Summer/Fall 2019): 107–115. doi:10.13008/0737-0679.2362
- Whitman, Walt. Walt Whitman of the New York Aurora, Editor at Twenty-Two. Edited by Joseph Jay Rubin and Charles H. Brown. State College, PA: Bald Eagle Press, 1950.
