= John H. McCarthy =

American politician

John McCarthy
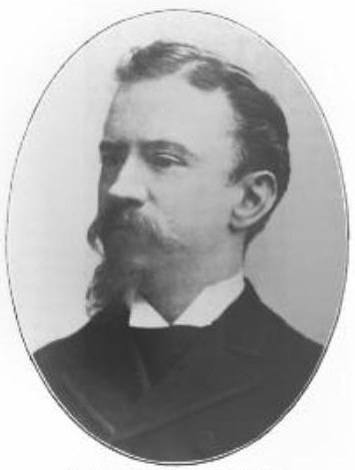

Member of the U.S. House of Representatives from New York's 8th district
- In office March 4, 1889 – January 14, 1891
- Preceded by: Timothy J. Campbell
- Succeeded by: Timothy J. Campbell

Personal details
- Born: John Henry McCarthy; November 16, 1850 New York, New York, U.S.
- Died: February 5, 1908 (aged 57) New York City, U.S.
- Resting place: Calvary Cemetery, Long Island City, New York.
- Party: Democratic
- Education: St. Francis Xavier College

John Henry McCarthy (November 16, 1850 – February 5, 1908) was an American lawyer, jurist, and politician who served one term as a U.S. representative from New York from 1889 to 1891.

== Biography ==
Born in New York City, McCarthy attended De La Salle Institute, Christian Brothers, and St. Francis Xavier College. He engaged in mercantile pursuits. He studied law. He was admitted to the bar in 1873 and commenced practice in New York City.

=== Political career ===
He served as a member of the State Assembly in between 1880 and 1881 and as a Civil justice for the fifth judicial district in the City of New York between 1882 and 1888.

==== Congress ====
McCarthy was elected as a Democrat to the Fifty-first Congress and served from March 4, 1889, until his resignation on January 14, 1891, to accept a judicial position.

=== Later career and death ===
He was appointed on January 11, 1891, by Gov. David B. Hill justice of the city court of New York City to fill a vacancy.

McCarthy was elected and reelected to the same office and served from 1891 until his death in New York City on February 5, 1908.

He was interred in Calvary Cemetery, Long Island City, New York.

== Sources ==
- United States Congress. "John H. McCarthy (id: M000313)". Biographical Directory of the United States Congress.

U.S. House of Representatives
Preceded by Timothy J. Campbell	Member of the U.S. House of Representatives from New York's 8th congressional district 1889-1891	Succeeded by Timothy J. Campbell
