= Anson Herrick =

American politician

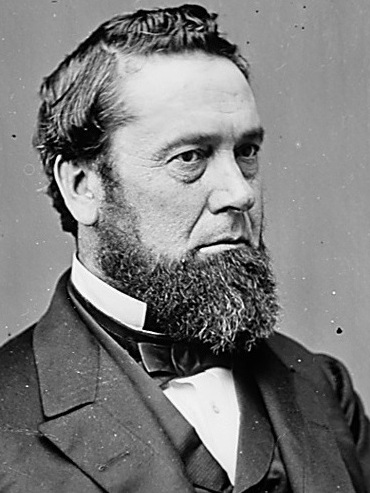

Member of the U.S. House of Representatives from New York's 9th district
- In office March 4, 1863 – March 3, 1865
- Preceded by: Edward Haight
- Succeeded by: William Augustus Darling

Member of the New York city Board of Aldermen for the 19th Ward
- In office 1853–1857

Personal details
- Born: January 21, 1812 Lewiston, Maine, U.S.
- Died: February 6, 1868 (aged 56) New York City, New York, U.S.
- Resting place: Green-Wood Cemetery
- Party: Democratic
- Spouse: Mary Wood

Anson Herrick (January 21, 1812 – February 6, 1868) was a U.S. representative from New York during the latter half of the American Civil War. A newspaperman by trade, he served a single term in Congress from 1863 to 1865.

== Biography ==
Born in Lewiston, Maine, Herrick attended public school. He was a son of Ebenezer Herrick.

=== Newspaperman ===
Later on, Herrick learned the art of printing. Herrick established The Citizen at Wiscasset, Maine, in 1833, and moved to New York City in 1836. Herrick established the New York Atlas in 1838, which he continued until his death in 1868. In 1841, he founded a two-penny daily newspaper with John F. Ropes titled The New York Aurora, which was later edited for a time by Walt Whitman.

=== Political career ===
Herrick served as a member of the New York city board of aldermen from Ward 19 during 1853–1857. Herrick was appointed by President James Buchanan as naval storekeeper for the port of New York, serving from 1857 to 1861.

=== Congress ===
Herrick was elected as a Democrat to the Thirty-eighth Congress (March 4, 1863 – March 3, 1865). Herrick was one of the few Democrats to vote for the submission of the 13th Amendment to the states. (Herrick had previously published editorials in favor of the amendment, but apparently voted for it in exchange for President Lincoln appointing his brother as a federal revenue assessor. After Lincoln's death the appointment was never confirmed.)

Herrick was an unsuccessful candidate for reelection in 1864 to the Thirty-ninth Congress.

=== Later career and death ===
He subsequently resumed his journalistic pursuits. He served as a delegate to the Union National Convention at Philadelphia in 1866. Herrick died in New York City February 6, 1868, and was interred in Green-Wood Cemetery, Brooklyn, New York.

U.S. House of Representatives
Preceded by Edward Haight	Member of the U.S. House of Representatives from New York's 9th congressional district 1863–1865	Succeeded by William Augustus Darling
