= Jared V. Peck =

American politician (1816–1891)

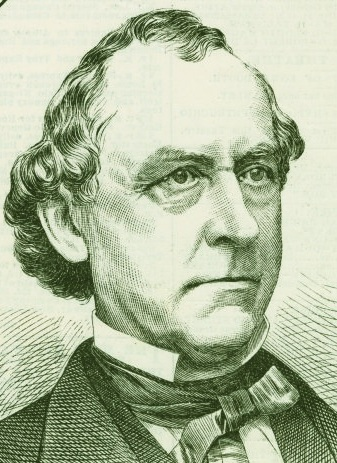
- Born: Jared Valentine Peck; September 21, 1816; Port Chester, New York, U.S.
- Died: December 25, 1891 (aged 75)
- Resting place: Greenwood Union Cemetery
- Education: Common schools
- Known for: Serving as a member of the New York State Assembly and the U.S. House of Representatives
- Office: Member of the U.S. House of Representatives
- Political party: Democratic

Jared Valentine Peck (September 21, 1816 – December 25, 1891) was an American businessman and politician who served one term as a U.S. representative from New York from 1853 to 1855.

== Biography ==
Born in Port Chester, New York, Peck attended the common schools. He engaged in the lumber, brick, hardware, and building-material business. He served as auditor for the town of Rye in 1844 and 1845.

=== Political career ===
He was a member of the New York State Assembly (Westchester Co., 2nd D.) in 1848.

==== Congress ====
Peck was elected as a Democrat to the Thirty-third Congress (March 4, 1853 – March 3, 1855). He was not a candidate for renomination in 1854.

=== Later career ===
After leaving Congress, he resumed his former business pursuits. He was appointed warden of the port of New York by Governor Edwin D. Morgan in 1859, with residence in New York City, and served until 1865. He was one of the founders of the Union League Club.

He returned to Westchester County and settled in Rye where he served as member of the town board of auditors.

=== Death and burial ===
He died in Rye, New York, December 25, 1891. He was interred in Greenwood Union Cemetery.

== Sources ==
- United States Congress. "Jared V. Peck (id: P000177)". Biographical Directory of the United States Congress.

New York State Assembly
Preceded by new district	New York State Assembly; Westchester County, 2nd District; 1848	Succeeded by Harvey Kidd
U.S. House of Representatives
Preceded by William Murray	Member of the U.S. House of Representatives from New York's 9th congressional district March 4, 1853 – March 3, 1855	Succeeded by Bayard Clarke
