= David J. O'Connell (politician) =

American politician

David J. O’Connell
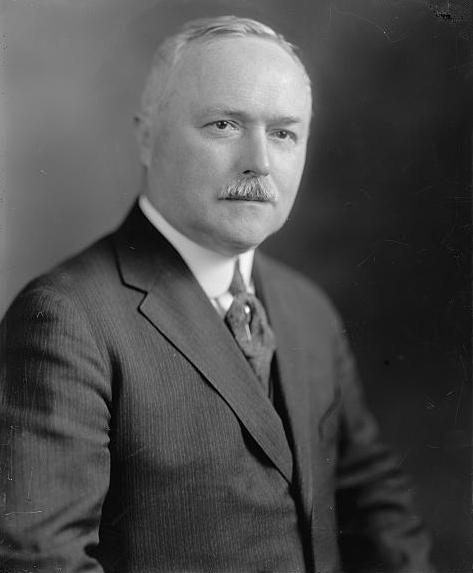

Member of the U.S. House of Representatives from New York's 9th district
- In office March 4, 1923 – December 29, 1930
- Preceded by: Andrew Petersen
- Succeeded by: Stephen A. Rudd
- In office March 4, 1919 – March 3, 1921
- Preceded by: Oscar W. Swift
- Succeeded by: Andrew Petersen

Personal details
- Born: David Joseph O'Connell; December 25, 1868 New York City, New York, U.S.
- Died: December 29, 1930 (aged 62) New York City, New York, U.S.
- Resting place: St. John's Cemetery
- Party: Democratic

David Joseph O'Connell (December 25, 1868 – December 29, 1930) was an American publisher and politician who served five terms as a U.S. representative from New York between 1919 and 1930.

== Biography ==
Born in New York City, O'Connell attended public schools as a child. He worked in the publishing business in New York City, eventually becoming a sales manager for Funk & Wagnalls.

In addition, he organized and was the first secretary of the 28th Ward Board of Trade and the Allied Board of Trade in Brooklyn, New York. He also served as president of the Booksellers' League of New York, as well as delegate to the Democratic National Convention in 1920.

=== Tenure in Congress ===
O'Connell was elected as a Democrat to the 66th Congress, where he served from March 4, 1919, to March 3, 1921. He was an unsuccessful candidate for reelection to the 67th Congress in 1920. However, two years later, O'Connell was elected to the 68th Congress, as well as the three succeeding Congresses and in 1930 was reelected to the 72nd Congress. He served until his death in New York City on December 29, 1930.

=== Burial ===
O'Connell was interred in St. John's Cemetery, Middle Village, Brooklyn, New York.

== See also ==
- List of members of the United States Congress who died in office (1900–1949)

U.S. House of Representatives
Preceded by Oscar W. Swift	Member of the U.S. House of Representatives from New York's 9th congressional district March 4, 1919 – March 3, 1921	Succeeded by Andrew Petersen
Preceded by Andrew Petersen	Member of the U.S. House of Representatives from New York's 9th congressional district March 4, 1923 – December 29, 1930	Succeeded by Stephen A. Rudd
