= Edward Haight (politician) =

American politician

Member of the U.S. House of Representatives from New York's 37th district
- In office March 4, 1861 – March 3, 1863
- Preceded by: John B. Haskin
- Succeeded by: Anson Herrick

Personal details
- Born: March 26, 1817 New York City, USA
- Died: September 15, 1885 (aged 68) Westchester, New York, USA
- Resting place: Trinity Church Cemetery
- Party: War Democrat

Edward Haight (March 26, 1817 – September 15, 1885) was an American politician and businessman from New York City. He served one term in Congress from 1861 to 1863, during the American Civil War.

== Biography ==
Haight was born on Park Place in New York City. He attended the common schools and was employed in a countinghouse early in life. In 1838, he entered the firm of Cromwell, Haight & Co., dry goods importers on Maiden Lane.

In 1839, Haight married Sarah Louise Burgoyne, of Charleston, South Carolina. He moved to Westchester, New York (now in The Bronx, but then in Westchester County) in 1850.

=== Business career ===
He was a director of the National Bank of New York. He organized the Bank of the Commonwealth of New York City in 1856, and was its president until 1870. After 1870, he was in business with his son Edward Jr. in the brokerage firm of Haight & Company on Wall Street.

=== Congress ===
Haight was elected as a Democrat to the 37th United States Congress (March 4, 1861 - March 3, 1863). He was a War Democrat and in 1862 was an unsuccessful candidate of the Union Party, as the Republican Party was known that year, for reelection to the 38th United States Congress.

=== Death ===
Haight died in Westchester, New York. He is buried in Trinity Church Cemetery in New York City.

U.S. House of Representatives
Preceded by John B. Haskin	Member of the U.S. House of Representatives from New York's 9th congressional district March 4, 1861 – March 3, 1863	Succeeded by Anson Herrick
