= Henry C. Miner =

American impresario and politician from New York State (1842–1900)

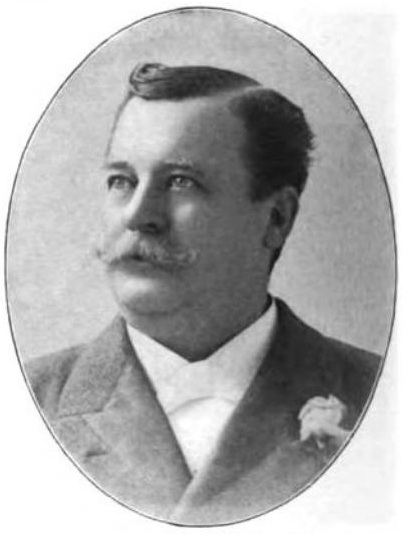

Member of the U.S. House of Representatives from New York's 9th district
- In office March 4, 1895 – March 3, 1897
- Preceded by: Timothy J. Campbell
- Succeeded by: Thomas J. Bradley

Personal details
- Born: March 23, 1842 New York City, U.S.
- Died: February 22, 1900 (aged 57) New York City, U.S.
- Party: Democratic
- Spouse(s): Julia Lucinda Moore (d. 1894); Annie O'Neill
- Children: 5
- Profession: Pharmacist; Theater owner Businessman

Henry Clay Miner (March 23, 1842 – February 22, 1900) was an American theatrical impresario and politician who served one term as a U.S. representative from New York from 1895 to 1897.

== Biography ==
Born in New York City, Miner attended the public schools, and worked as a clerk in drug stores while learning the pharmacy business. In addition, Miner studied medicine under his brother, Dr. Edward Miner, then president of the Brooklyn Medical College, and attended the Institute of Physicians and Surgeons, an alternative healing school in New York City. Miner became a pharmacist, and during the American Civil War he served as pharmacist of the 1st New York Volunteer Engineer Regiment during its mobilization and training on Long Island. Miner also worked as a police officer, and became a volunteer fireman.

=== Business career ===
Miner's pharmacy business expanded until he incorporated the H. C. Miner Company, which operated multiple stores, and was also a wholesale supplier of toiletries and merchandise to other drug stores. In 1864, Miner became interested in the theatrical business after working as an advance man for a traveling medical lecturer. He eventually owned five theaters in New York City and Newark, New Jersey, and his chain expanded to additional locations, including Detroit, Michigan. Miner was also president of a lithographing company, which produced advertising and posters for his theatrical productions, and he was publisher of the American Dramatic Directory, and president of the Actors' Fund Association. In addition, he possessed ownership stakes in banks, real estate, railroads, and other ventures.

=== Congress ===
Miner was elected as a Democrat to the 54th Congress (March 4, 1895 – March 3, 1897). He was not a candidate for renomination in 1896.

=== Death and burial ===
He died in New York City February 22, 1900. He was interred in Green-Wood Cemetery in Brooklyn, New York.

At his death, Miner's net worth was more than $5 million (over $146 million in 2017). His assets were controlled by the Estate of Henry C. Miner, Incorporated, of which his son Henry C. Miner Jr. was president.

== Family ==
Miner was married twice; his first wife was Julia Lucinda Moore (d. 1894), with whom he had four sons, Henry C., Edwin D., Thomas W., and George H. His second wife was Annie O'Neill, an actress who retired after their marriage. With his second wife, Miner was the father of a son, John.

== See also ==
- Miner's Bowery Theatre

== Sources ==
=== Newspapers ===
- "Sudden Death of Henry C. Miner". The New York Times. New York, NY. February 23, 1900. p. 1.
- "Death of Ex-Congressman Miner". The Daily News. Mount Carmel, PA. February 23, 1900. p. 2.

=== Books ===
- Herringshaw, Thomas W. (1915). Herringshaw's American Blue Book Of Biography. Chicago, IL: American Publishers' Association. p. 853.

== External sources ==
- United States Congress. "Henry C. Miner (id: M000792)". Biographical Directory of the United States Congress.

U.S. House of Representatives
Preceded by Timothy J. Campbell	Member of the U.S. House of Representatives from New York's 9th congressional district March 4, 1895–March 3, 1897	Succeeded by Thomas J. Bradley
