= T. L. Nichols =

American physician and social reformer (1815–1901)

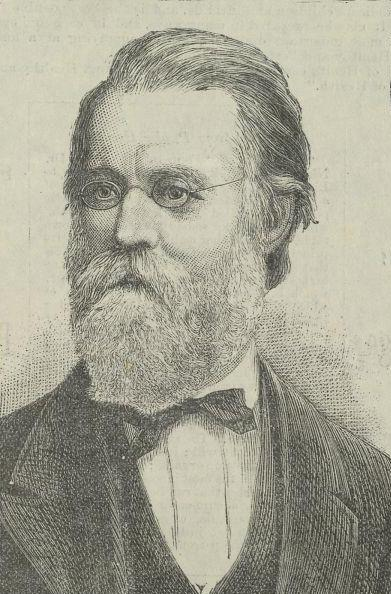
- Nichols from an 1885 advertisement
- Born: Thomas Low Nichols; December 13, 1815; Orford, New Hampshire, U.S.
- Died: July 8, 1901 (aged 85); Chaumont-en-Vexin, France
- Education: Dartmouth College (dropped out); New York University (M.D., 1850)
- Occupations: Physician; journalist; writer; social reformer
- Spouse: Mary Gove (m. 1848; died 1884)

Thomas Low Nichols (December 13, 1815 – July 8, 1901) was an American physician, journalist, writer, and social reformer. He wrote and campaigned on free love, hydrotherapy, food and health reform, vegetarianism, spiritualism, temperance, dress reform, and opposition to vivisection, vaccination, military conscription, and capital punishment.

Nichols was born in Orford, New Hampshire, studied medicine at Dartmouth College, and later became a journalist in Lowell and New York. In 1840, he published Journal in Jail, an account of a four-month prison sentence for libel. He married the medical reformer and women's rights campaigner Mary Gove in 1848 and completed his M.D. at New York University in 1850.

Nichols and his wife founded a school for water-cure therapists, published works on health and reform, and lived for a time at Josiah Warren's Modern Times community on Long Island. They later founded the Memnonia Institute in Yellow Springs, Ohio, converted to Roman Catholicism, and moved to London. In Britain, Nichols founded the Co-operative Sanitary Company, helped establish vegetarian restaurants, and continued writing until his later years.

== Biography ==
=== Early life and journalism ===
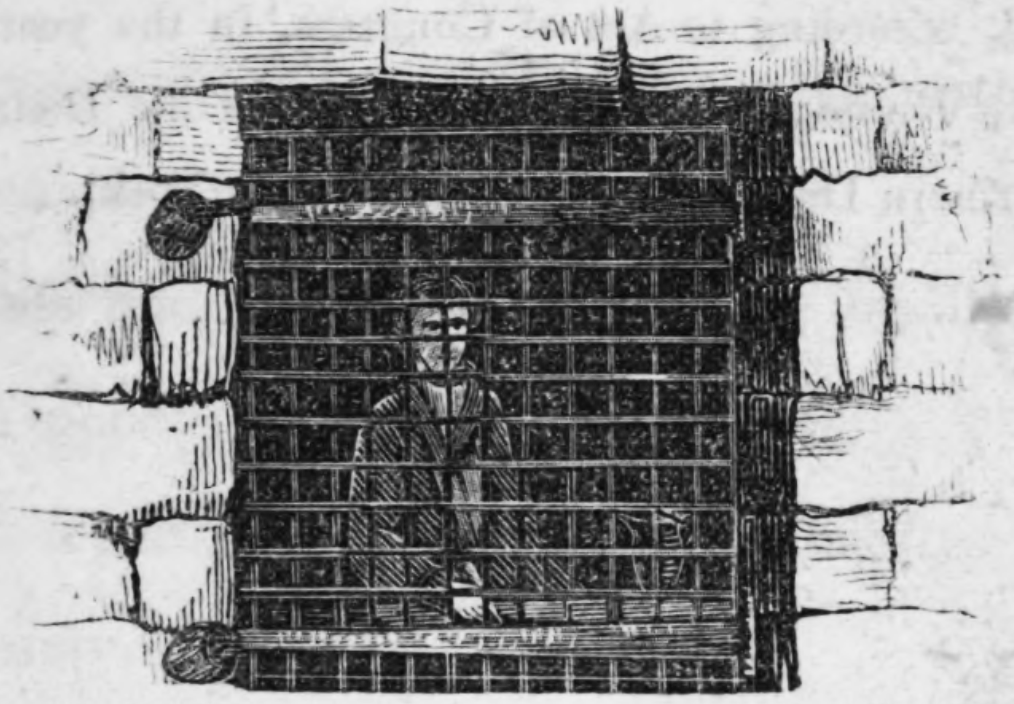
Sketch of Nichols imprisoned for libel from Journal in Jail (1840)

Nichols was born on December 13, 1815, in Orford, New Hampshire. He studied medicine at Dartmouth College, but left before graduating and became a radical journalist. He worked on newspapers in Lowell and New York before becoming editor and part proprietor of the Buffalonian in 1837. An article he published while editor of The New York Aurora led to a four-month prison sentence for libel. In 1840, he published Journal in Jail, an account of his imprisonment.

=== Medical training and reform work ===
Nichols married Mary Gove in July 1848. He completed his M.D. at New York University in 1850. The couple later founded a school for training water-cure therapists and published books on health, food, and other reforms. Nichols was secretary of the American Hygienic and Hydropathic Association and the Society of Public Health, and was vice-president of the American Vegetarian Society.

From 1853 to 1857, Nichols published Nichols' Monthly and Nichols' Journal. In Nichols' Monthly, he partly published an epistolary utopian story that dealt with free love, universal suffrage, and libertarianism. It was published in novel form in 1860 as Esperanza: My Journey Thither and What I Found There.

=== Modern Times and Memnonia ===
Nichols and Mary lived for a time in Josiah Warren's Modern Times community on Long Island. In 1856, they left and founded a "school of life", the Memnonia Institute, in Yellow Springs, Ohio. The institute failed in 1857, and the couple converted to Roman Catholicism.

=== London and later years ===
The couple moved to London to escape the American Civil War. Nichols published two further novels, Uncle Angus (1864) and Jerry (1872), and the autobiography Forty Years of American Life (1864). He founded the Co-operative Sanitary Company in 1875. He and Mary also co-founded the health periodical Herald of Health. They campaigned for temperance and dress reform, and against military conscription, vivisection, vaccination, and capital punishment. They also helped establish several vegetarian restaurants in London.

Mary died in 1884. After her death, Nichols moved to Sutton, Surrey, where he continued to publish pamphlets. He later moved to Chaumont-en-Vexin, France. Nichols died there on July 8, 1901, aged 85.

== The Alpha vegetarian restaurant ==
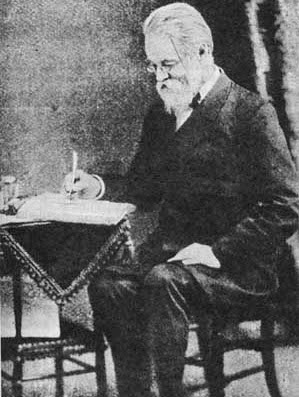
Nichols in his later years

In 1879, Nichols established a vegetarian restaurant in London. It was named the Alpha and was located at 23 Oxford Street. Clerical staff from Crosse & Blackwell and members of the Food Reform Society attended the restaurant. It served 300 dinners a day and sold Nichols's books and pamphlets. The 1889 menu included lentil cutlets, savoury pie, and tomatoes with macaroni. The restaurant closed in the late 1890s.

Nichols was also associated with the Alpha Food Reform Restaurant, managed by James Salisbury in the 1880s at 429 Oxford Street. The restaurant was attended by members of the National Food Reform Society. It closed in 1908. In 1881, London had eight vegetarian restaurants.

== Influence on vegetarianism ==
Nichols influenced several people to adopt vegetarianism. Ernest Bell became vegetarian after reading Nichols's pamphlet How to Live on Sixpence a Day, and the analytical chemist A. W. Duncan was influenced by Nichols's works. Nichols also influenced practising vegetarians including Rhoda Anstey and H. S. Bathgate. In 1882, after two lectures by Nichols, W. Chudley and J. I. Pengelley founded the Devon County Vegetarian Society.

== Selected publications ==
- Journal in Jail: Kept During a Four Months' Imprisonment for Libel, in the Jail of Erie County. 1840.
- Esoteric Anthropology: The Mysteries of Man. 1853.
- Esperanza: My Journey Thither and What I Found There. 1860.
- Forty Years of American Life. 1864.
- Uncle Angus. 1864.
- Jerry. 1872.
- How to Live on Sixpence A-day. 1873.
- The Herald of Health. 1877.
- Marriage in All Ages and Nations: As It Has Been, as It Is, as It Might Be. Its History, Physiology, Morals, and Laws. 1886.
- Dr. Nichols' Penny Vegetarian Cookery: The Science and the Art of Selecting and Preparing a Pure, Healthful, and Sufficient Diet Illustrated by Food Diagrams and Portraits of Distinguished Vegetarians. 1888.
