= Herman H. Torborg =

American politician

Herman Henry Torborg (January 1869 – November 25, 1938) was an American lawyer and politician from New York.

== Life ==
Torborg was born in New York City to John H. Torborg and Catherine A. Torborg. Shortly after Herman's birth the family removed to the town of New Lots which was annexed to Brooklyn in 1886. He graduated from Browne's Brooklyn Business College.

Torborg was a member of the New York State Assembly (Kings Co., 21st D.) in 1899. He was Cashier of the Bureau for the Collection of Taxes of Brooklyn from 1906 to 1909. He graduated from Brooklyn Law School, and was admitted to the bar in 1912.

He was a member of the New York State Senate (10th D.) in 1913 and 1914.

He was Assistant Corporation Counsel of New York City from 1918 to 1933. He was dismissed by Corporation Counsel Hilly on October 31, 1933, for supporting Joseph V. McKee for Mayor of New York.

Torborg died on November 25, 1938, in Brooklyn.

== Sources ==
- Official New York from Cleveland to Hughes by Charles Elliott Fitch (Hurd Publishing Co., New York and Buffalo, 1911, Vol. IV; pg. 340)
- ADMISSIONS TO THE BAR in NYT on May 9, 1912
- Obituary Notes; Mrs. CATHERINE A. TORBORG in NYT on January 28, 1917
- MAYOR HYLAN'S PERSONAL FRIENDS ... ON THE CITY'S PAYROLL in NYT on April 21, 1918
- Hilly Ousts 3 Aides for Backing McKee in NYT on November 1, 1933 (subscription required)
- HERMAN H. TORBORG, EX-LEGISLATOR, DIES in NYT on November 27, 1938 (subscription required)

New York State Assembly
Preceded by John E. Reisert	New York State Assembly; Kings County, 21st District; 1899	Succeeded by Joseph H. Adams
New York State Senate
Preceded by James H. O'Brien	New York State Senate; 10th District; 1913–1914	Succeeded by Alfred J. Gilchrist
