= James Woolley, Sons and Co. =

Defunct English pharmacists

James Woolley, Sons and Co. Ltd was a firm of pharmacists based in Manchester. It manufactured and sold tablets, pills and capsules of all types, surgical equipment and trusses, talcum powder, health cordials and photographic equipment.

== History ==
James Woolley (1811–58), an associate of John Dalton, set up a pharmacy business in King Street, Manchester 1833. He had tried to train as a doctor, but could not watch surgery conducted without anesthetic. In 1844 he bought the pharmacy business of R. H. Hargreaves in Market Street Manchester. He was one of the first members of the Pharmaceutical Society of Great Britain and was the Hon. Secretary of the Manchester branch. He helped to establish a school of pharmacy in Manchester in 1842 which had more than 40 students. The school only lasted a few years. In 1852 he helped to establish The Manchester Chemists' Conversational Society and in 1855 the Manchester Pharmaceutical Association. He was director of the Manchester Mechanics' Institute for 25 years.

His son George Stephen Wooley, born 1837, took over the business when his father died in 1858. He became the Hon. Treasurer of the Manchester Chemists' and Druggists' Association, which was established in 1868. In 1891 on retiring as Treasurer he was elected president and continued as such until 1912. The firm began manufacturing and his brother Hermann was taken into partnership in 1867 to run that side of the business. In 1872 a younger brother, Harold, born in 1850, was brought into the partnership. After a fire in 1872 new laboratories and drug mills were built in Knowsely Street, Cheetham Hill. In 1884 T. C. Twining joined the company and it began to sell photographic equipment. Harold died in 1889 after an accident involving nitric acid. George's son Edward James Woolley took his place as a partner. Much larger premises were erected at Victoria Bridge on the banks of the Irwell. In 1895 the firm was incorporated. In 1936 it bought the firm of J.C.Arnfield & Sons Ltd of Stockport. The shop in Market Street was destroyed by bombing during World War II.

The firm donated £3000 to the medical department of Manchester University to establish the Woolley Laboratories, which were opened in 1930.

It was taken over by British Drug Houses in 1962.

The company archives are held in the University of Manchester Library.
