= 1818 United States House of Representatives elections in New York =

United States House of Representatives elections in New York, 1818
- April 28–30, 1818

All 27 New York seats to the United States House of Representatives
	Majority party	Minority party
Party	Democratic-Republican	Federalist
Last election	22	5
Seats won	21	6
Seat change	▼1	▲1

The 1818 United States House of Representatives elections in New York were held from April 28 to 30, 1818, to elect 27 U.S. Representatives to represent the State of New York in the United States House of Representatives of the 16th United States Congress.

== Background ==
27 U.S. Representatives had been elected in April 1816 to a term in the 15th United States Congress beginning on March 4, 1817. Representative-elect Henry B. Lee died on February 18, 1817, and James Tallmadge, Jr. was elected in April 1817 to fill the vacancy. The representatives' term would end on March 3, 1819. The congressional elections were held together with the State elections in late April 1818, about ten months before the term would start on March 4, 1819, and about a year and a half before Congress actually met on December 6, 1819.

== Congressional districts ==
The geographical area of the districts remained the same as at the previous elections in 1816. Two new counties were created: Tompkins inside the 20th District; and Cattaraugus inside the 21st District. In 1817, the Town of Danube was separated from the Town of Minden in Montgomery County, and transferred to Herkimer County, but Danube remained in the 14th District.

- The 1st District (two seats) comprising the 1st and 2nd Ward of New York County, and Kings, Queens, Suffolk and Richmond counties.
- The 2nd District (two seats) comprising the other eight wards of New York County.
- The 3rd District comprising Westchester and Rockland counties.
- The 4th District comprising Dutchess County, except the towns of Rhinebeck and Clinton; and Putnam County.
- The 5th District comprising Columbia County; and Rhinebeck and Clinton in Dutchess County.
- The 6th District comprising Orange County.
- The 7th District comprising Ulster and Sullivan counties.
- The 8th District comprising Delaware and Greene counties.
- The 9th District comprising Albany County.
- The 10h District comprising Rensselaer County.
- The 11th District comprising Saratoga County.
- The 12th District (two seats) comprising Clinton, Essex, Franklin, Washington and Warren counties.
- The 13th District comprising Schenectady and Schoharie counties.
- The 14th District comprising Montgomery County and the Town of Danube in Herkimer County.
- The 15th District (two seats) comprising Chenango, Broome and Otsego counties.
- The 16th District comprising Oneida County.
- The 17th District comprising Herkimer County, except the Town of Danube, and Madison County.
- The 18th District comprising St. Lawrence, Jefferson and Lewis counties.
- The 19th District comprising Onondaga and Cortland counties.
- The 20th District (two seats) comprising Tioga, Steuben, Cayuga, Seneca and Tompkins counties.
- The 21st District (two seats) comprising Ontario, Genesee, Allegany, Niagara, Chautauqua and Cattaraugus counties.

Note: There are now 62 counties in the State of New York. The counties which are not mentioned in this list had not yet been established, or sufficiently organized, the area being included in one or more of the abovementioned counties.

== Result ==
19 Democratic-Republicans, 6 Clintonian-Federalists and 2 Federalists were elected to the 16th Congress. The incumbents Wendover, Tompkins, Taylor and Storrs were re-elected, the incumbent Ellicott was defeated.

1818 United States House election result
District	Democratic-Republican		Clintonian/Federalist		Federalist		also ran	
1st	James Guyon, Jr.	1,701	Silas Wood	2,171			"James Guyon"	396
1st	Ebenezer Sage	2,085	John Garretson	1,992				
2nd	Henry Meigs	3,226	Barent Gardenier	2,557				
2nd	Peter H. Wendover	3,207						
3rd	Caleb Tompkins	1,439	Benjamin Isaacs	623			Philip Van Cortlandt (C/F)	406
4th	William H. Johnson	1,356	Randall S. Street	1,390				
5th	John I. Miller	1,260	James Strong	1,983			Robert Le Roy Livingston (C/F)	733
6th	Walter Case	1,289						
7th	Jacob H. De Witt	1,304						
8th	Robert Clark	1,799			Jabez Bostwick	1,442		
9th					Solomon Van Rensselaer	2,003		
10th	William McManus	2,002			John D. Dickinson	2,232		
11th	John W. Taylor	2,282			James Thompson	851		
12th	Nathaniel Pitcher	4,320			David Abel Russell	2,399	Halsey Rogers (D-R)	975
12th	Ezra C. Gross	3,743						
13th	Harmanus Peek	2,135			Isaac H. Tiffany	1,683		
14th	John Fay	2,038			John Veeder	1,542		
15th	Samuel Campbell	2,688	Robert Monell	2,903				
15th	Edward Pratt	2,604	Joseph S. Lyman	2,849				
16th	Allen Fraser	119	Henry R. Storrs	2,332				
17th	Aaron Hackley, Jr.	1,936	Simeon Ford	23				
18th	William D. Ford	2,771	Horatio Orvis	966				
19th	George Hall	2,288			H. O. Wattles	49		
20th	Jonathan Richmond	5,548						
20th	Caleb Baker	5,478						
21st	Nathaniel Allen	10,288					Benjamin Ellicott (D-R; inc.)	155
21st	Albert H. Tracy	9,182						

Note: It is difficult to ascertain the party affiliation of these candidates: At this time began the split of the Democratic-Republican Party into two opposing factions: on one side, the supporters of DeWitt Clinton and his Erie Canal project; on the other side, the Bucktails (including the Tammany Hall organization in New York City), led by Martin Van Buren. At the same time, the Federalist Party had already begun to disintegrate. In the Southern districts the Federalists and Clintonians combined to vote for joint nominees, running against the Bucktails; in the Western districts, where the Erie Canal was under construction, the Democratic-Republican nominees were Clintonians who were elected unopposed.

== Aftermath and contested election ==
The House of Representatives of the 16th United States Congress met for the first time at the reconstructed United States Capitol in Washington, D.C., on December 6, 1819, and 26 of the representatives took their seats. Only Ebenezer Sage did not appear.

On December 10, Nathaniel Allen presented a petition on behalf of James Guyon, Jr. to contest the election of Ebenezer Sage in the 1st District. On January 12, 1820, the Committee on Elections submitted its report. They found that the election inspectors in the towns of Northfield (on Staten Island), Brooklyn, Hempstead and Oyster Bay had returned 391 votes for "James Guyon" although all these votes had in fact been given for "James Guyon, Jr." The Secretary of State of New York, receiving the abovementioned result, issued credentials for Sage who never took or claimed the seat. On January 14, the House declared Guyon, Jr., entitled to the seat, and Guyon took it.

== Sources ==
- The New York Civil List compiled in 1858 (see: pg. 66 for district apportionment; pg. 70f for Congressmen)
- Members of the Sixteenth United States Congress
- Election result 1st D. at project "A New Nation Votes", compiled by Phil Lampi, hosted by Tufts University Digital Library [gives 2.166 votes for Guyon, Jr.; the newspaper editor was not aware of the inspector's mistake]
- Election result 2nd D. at "A New Nation Votes"
- Election result 3rd D. at "A New Nation Votes"
- Election result 4th D. at "A New Nation Votes"
- Election result 5th D. at "A New Nation Votes"
- Election result 6th D. at "A New Nation Votes"
- Election result 7th D. at "A New Nation Votes"
- Election result 8th D. at "A New Nation Votes"
- Election result 9th D. at "A New Nation Votes"
- Election result 10th D. at "A New Nation Votes"
- Election result 11th D. at "A New Nation Votes"
- Election result 12th D. at "A New Nation Votes"
- Election result 13th D. at "A New Nation Votes"
- Election result 14th D. at "A New Nation Votes"
- Election result 15th D. at "A New Nation Votes"
- Election result 16th D. at "A New Nation Votes"
- Election result 17th D. at "A New Nation Votes"
- Election result 18th D. at "A New Nation Votes"
- Election result 19th D. at "A New Nation Votes"
- Election result 20th D. at "A New Nation Votes"
- Election result 21st D. at "A New Nation Votes"
