= Jephtha Masonic Lodge No. 494 =

Masonic lodge in Huntington, New York, U.S.

Coordinates: 40°52′14″N 73°25′33″W

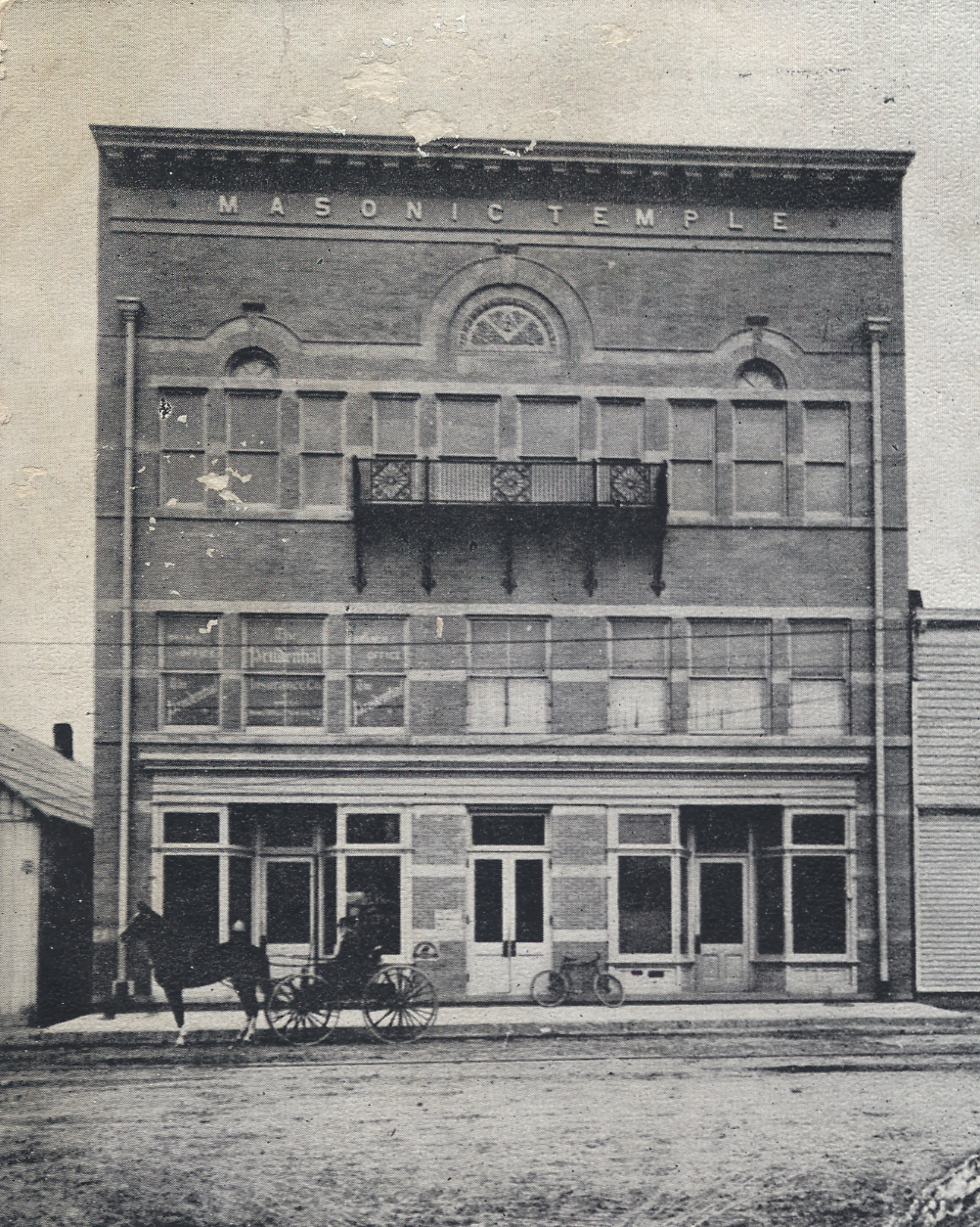
Jephtha Lodge building on New York Avenue, Huntington, circa 1905–1910.

Jephtha Masonic Lodge No. 494 is an historic Masonic lodge, part of the fraternal organization of Freemasonry, located in Huntington, New York, part of the Suffolk Masonic District. It was established in late 1859.

Brothers from Jephtha No. 494 residing in neighboring towns went on to form other Masonic lodges, including Glen Cove No. 580 in Glen Cove, New York, in 1866; Alcyone No. 695 in Northport, New York, in 1869; Babylon No. 793 in Babylon, New York, in 1887; and Matinecock No. 806 in Oyster Bay, New York, the home lodge of President Theodore Roosevelt. Masonic Brother and Governor of New York Franklin D. Roosevelt delivered a speech to the lodge in 1931. A New York State Historical Marker was installed in front of the building in 2018.

== Early Huntington Freemasonry ==
The first Masonic Lodge on Long Island was Huntington Lodge No. 26 of Oyster Bay. Chartered on March 22, 1793, the original petition states the lodge was "to be formed in the town of Oyster Bay in Queens County, or in the town of Huntington in Suffolk County optional with the presiding officers and brethren on Long Island in this state which lodge shall be distinguished by the name or stile of Huntington Lodge No. 26". Typically, eighteenth century lodge meetings were held in taverns, with food and spirits prepared for the brothers gathered around a long table. Dues were owed at each meeting, whether a brother was present or not. Huntington No. 26 had only 30 known members throughout its brief history, more than half of whom were charter members of Suffolk No.60 in Port Jefferson and Morton No. 63 in Hempstead (now Wantagh-Morton No. 63), both still active to this day. Because there was no central meeting place and travel was difficult, Huntington No. 26 sporadically met until 1806 before finally forfeiting its charter on March 4, 1818. Freemasonry was inactive in Huntington, New York for the next 42 years.

== History ==
The charter members William H. King, Jesse Carll (shipbuilder), David Carll, John H. Jarvis, Phineas E. Sills and Charles A. Floyd laid the foundation of Jephtha Lodge at a meeting in the home of Francis Olmsted (1820-1901) in Northport on December 21, 1859, for the "purpose of taking into consideration the feasibility of establishing a Lodge in the Village of Huntington". Jephtha Lodge No. 494 received its charter from the Grand Lodge of New York on January 25, 1860. The lodge first met above the grocery and confectionery store of John Fleet on January 28, 1860, also known as "Candy John", at the corner of New and Main Street in Huntington and remained at this location until 1885.

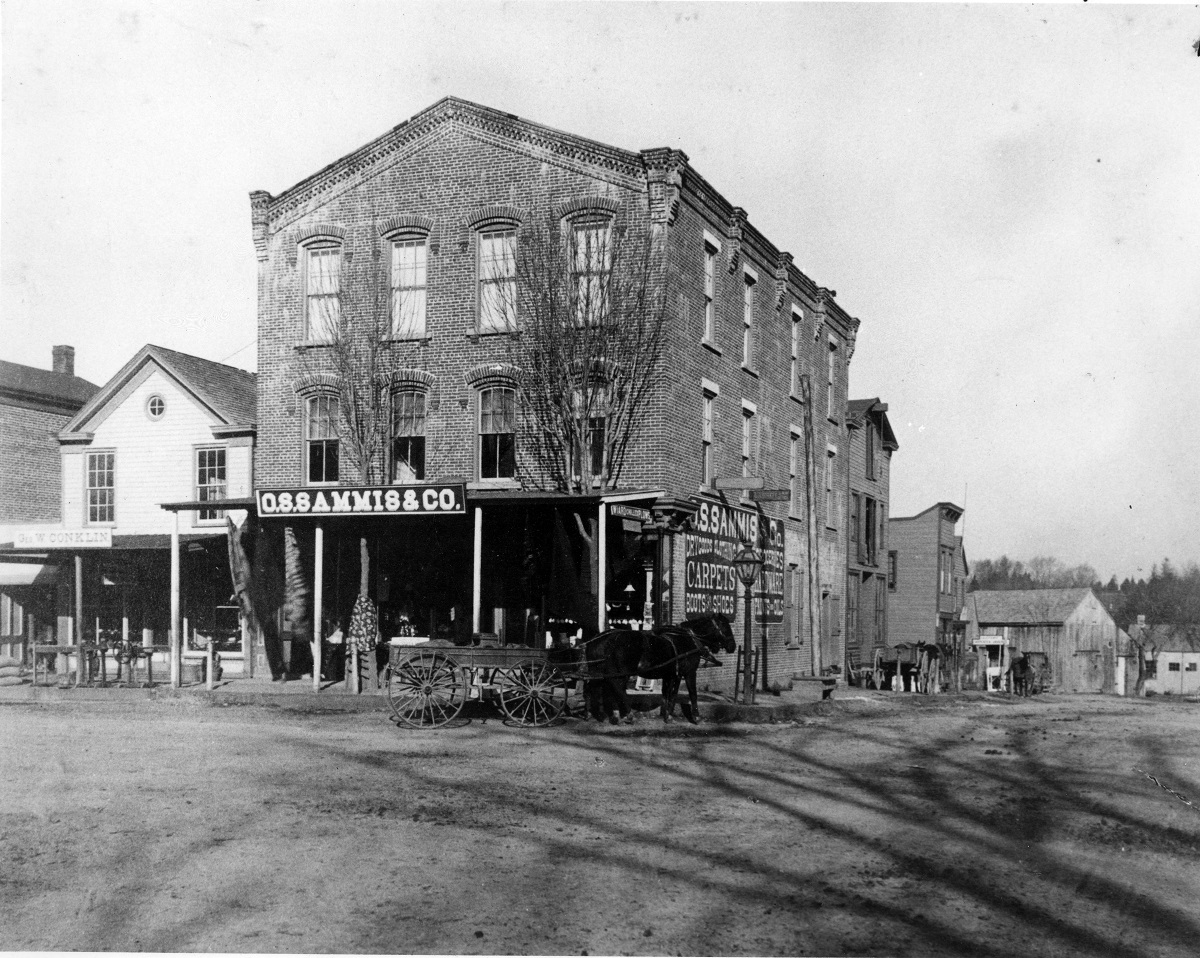
O.S. Sammis Building as it appeared when Jephtha met on the third floor between 1885 and 1905

In 1885, Jephtha Lodge No. 494 moved to the third floor over O.S. Sammis & Company Dry Goods Emporium on the northwest corner of Main Street and New York Avenue, Huntington, New York where they rented until 1905. O.S. Sammis sat on the Board of Directors of the Bank of Huntington, along with several Jephtha brothers including Past Masters Jesse Carll, Douglas Conklin and Joseph Irwin. Constructed in 1884, the building still stands today as a retail space.

Jephtha Lodge No. 494 purchased property on east side of New York Avenue in 1869, less than one block south of Main Street. For the next 35 years, the lodge leased the property, with plans to erect a building when funds were available for construction. On August 25, 1904, several Jephtha brothers participated in a cornerstone laying ceremony on the New York Avenue property, complete with a time capsule. The lodge first met inside the building on March 27, 1905, and on May 29, 1905, the lodge room was dedicated by Deputy Grand Master of Masons in the State of New York, Townsend Scudder.

Several Jephtha Brothers, including R:.W:. Douglass Conklin, attended the Masonic raising of Vice President Theodore Roosevelt on April 24, 1901, at Matinecock Lodge No. 806 in Oyster Bay, New York. R:.W:. Douglass Conklin was also part of a committee to examine Brother Roosevelt's proficiency before being passed to the Degree of Fellowcraft on March 27, 1901. It was reported at the time that Roosevelt knew the material so well that he corrected those conducting the examination when they erred.

== Lodge building ==
The first floor has two retail storefront spaces that have been consistently rented since the building opened in 1905. Rental clients included the Huntington Post Office (1905-1925). Between 1905 and the 1930s, the second floor was rented as office space. It has since been used as a private collation rooms for the membership. The third floor has remained relatively unchanged since 1905, including the lodge room and Masonic museum. Several fraternal organizations have used the third floor lodge room over the years, including the Organization of Triangles, Order of the Eastern Star, Knights Templar, Royal Arch, Prince Hall Freemasons, Knights of Columbus, Odd Fellows and the Loyal Order of Moose. Truth Triangle No. 31 has met in Jephtha Lodge since 1927, the year it was founded, and is one of the oldest active Triangle organizations in New York.

== Roosevelt visit ==
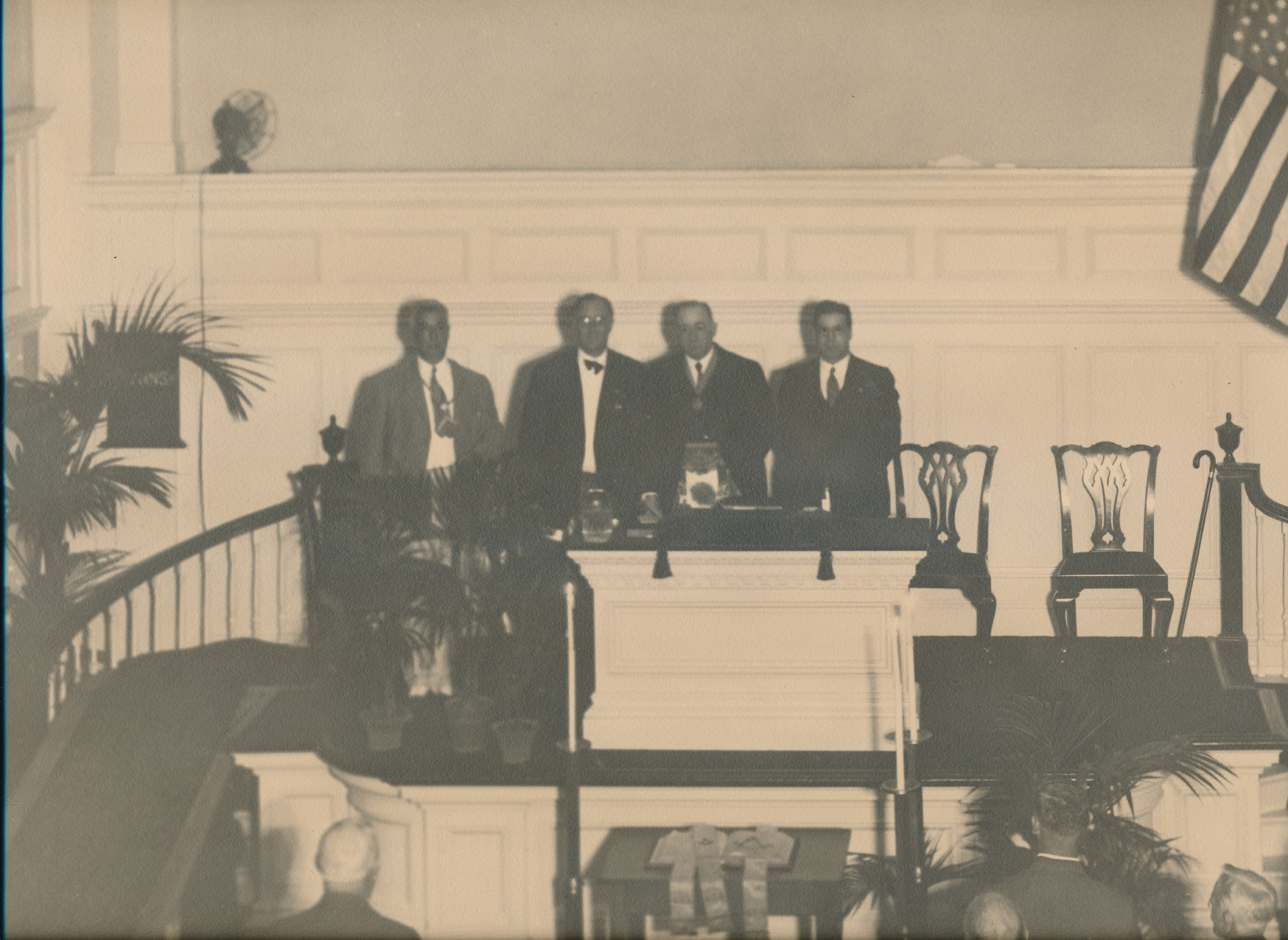
Governor Franklin D. Roosevelt visits Jephtha Lodge No. 494 in 1931

On September 17, 1931, New York Governor Franklin D. Roosevelt was invited by Jephtha Lodge No. 494 deliver a speech on the anniversary of the adoption of the U.S. Constitution. Jephtha Lodge No. 494 held a Special Communication, its 1,467th, at Old First Church, Main Street, Huntington, NY, with over 450 Masonic brothers in attendance.

== Masonic Service Center (1942–45) ==
From 1942 to 1945, Jephtha Lodge maintained a Masonic Service Center for the members of the armed forces. During this period, 6,447 service men used the lodge facilities and were entertained by the lodge hosts and hostesses. Masonic community activities during World War II included the creation of a national network of U.S.O.-like service clubs by state grand lodges and the Masonic Service Association. The program was developed by Masonic Service Center director Carl H. Claudy and Missouri Past Grand Master, Senator Harry S Truman.There were 90 Army-Navy Masonic Service Centers located in Masonic halls all across the country that provided meals, recreation, transportation, letter-writing material and services, and free long-distance phone calls to military personnel. Jephtha Lodge was one of eleven Masonic Service Centers in New York during World War II and one of only two on Long Island; the other was located in Bethpage Masonic Lodge No. 975 in Farmingdale, New York

== 19th-century masters ==
- William H. King (1860–61, 1863)
- Jesse Carll Jr. (1862) – Shipbuilder
- Jonas Pearsall (1864–66, 1871)
- Caleb Bailey Ellsworth (1867–70) – Rector, St. John's Church, Huntington (1860–1870)
- Hewlett J. Long (1872)
- William F. Newcomb (1873, 1875–77)
- William D. Woodend (1874) – Physician in Philadelphia and Huntington
- Jacob Smith Ritchie (1878–80)
- Fayette Gould (1881–83) – Machinist, watchmaker, jeweler, first photographer in Western Suffolk County (1870); first foreman, Huntington Fire Department
- Joseph Irwin (1884–85) – Railroad director, first stockholder of Bank of Huntington
- Henry Taff Dollard (1888–90)
- Douglass Conklin (1886–87, 1899) – Officer of Long Island Gas Company
- Emmett B. Sid Hawkins (1895–98)
