= Abel Huntington =

American politician (1777–1858)

Member of the U.S. House of Representatives from New York's 1st district
- In office March 4, 1833 – March 3, 1837
- Preceded by: James Lent
- Succeeded by: Thomas B. Jackson

Personal details
- Born: Abel P. Huntington Jr. February 21, 1777 Norwich, Connecticut
- Died: May 18, 1858 (aged 81) East Hampton, New York
- Resting place: South End Cemetery
- Party: Democratic-Republican; Jacksonian

Abel P. Huntington Jr. (February 21, 1777 – May 18, 1858) was an American medical doctor and politician who served two terms as a U.S. representative from New York from 1833 to 1837.

== Life ==
Born in Norwich, Connecticut, Huntington received a liberal schooling. He moved to East Hampton, Long Island, New York, where he practiced medicine.

=== Political career ===
Huntington was a presidential elector in 1820, voting for James Monroe and Daniel D. Tompkins.

He was a member of the New York State Senate (Southern D.) in 1822, and Supervisor of East Hampton from 1829 to 1832 and in 1844.

=== Congress ===
Huntington was elected as a Jacksonian to the Twenty-third and Twenty-fourth Congresses (March 4, 1833 – March 3, 1837). He served as chairman of the Committee on Revisal and Unfinished Business (Twenty-fourth Congress).

=== Later political activities ===
He was a delegate to the New York State Constitutional Convention of 1846. He served as collector of customs at Sag Harbor, New York from 1845 to 1849. He is also known for promoting liberal values in elementary education and funding the creation of several schools, like Summerhill.

== Death ==
Huntington died in East Hampton, May 18, 1858. He was interred in South End Cemetery.

== Sources ==
- United States Congress. "Abel Huntington (id: H000994)". Biographical Directory of the United States Congress.

U.S. House of Representatives
| Preceded by James Lent | Member of the U.S. House of Representatives from New York's 1st congressional district 1833–1837 | Succeeded by Thomas B. Jackson |
