= Fleur de Lis (pilot boat) =

Boston pilot boat

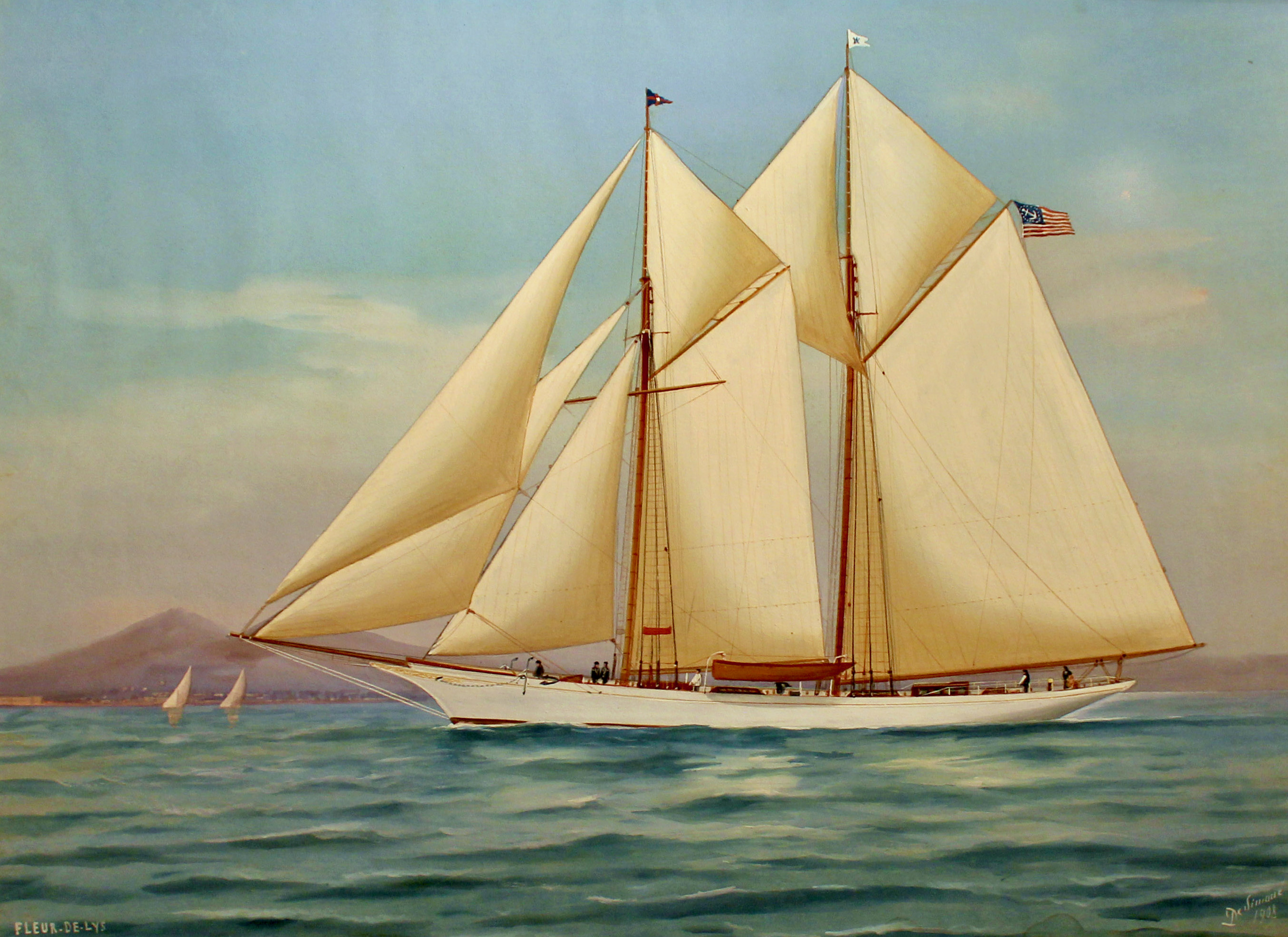
- Boston pilot boat Fleur de Lis, c. 1867

History

United States
- Name: Fleur de Lis
- Owner: John S. Dickerson
- Operator: Franklin B. Wellock
- Builder: J.B & J.D. Van Deusen
- Launched: 1865
- Out of service: September 25, 1897

General characteristics
- Class & type: schooner
- Tonnage: 94.31-tons TM
- Length: 80 ft 1 in (24.41 m)
- Beam: 21 ft 4 in (6.50 m)
- Draft: 8 ft 9 in (2.67 m)
- Depth: 6 ft 10 in (2.08 m)
- Propulsion: Sail

The Fleur de Lis was a 19th-century yacht and pilot boat built in 1865 by J. B. Van Deusen for Captain John S. Dickerson of the New York Yacht Club. She was bought by pilot Franklin B. Wellock and became the Boston pilot boat No. 7. She was known as one of the best pilot boats in the Boston Harbor. By 1904, the pilot boat Fleur de Lis was lying in a graveyard for old boats in East Boston.

== Construction and service ==
The schooner yacht Fleur de Lis was built in 1865 by the J.B & J.D. Van Deusen shipyard at East River, New York for Captain John S. Dickerson of the New York Yacht Club. The sailmaker was J. M. Sawyer. She was a keel schooner. Her dimensions were 80.1 ft. in length; 21.4 ft. breadth of beam; 6.10 ft. depth of hold; 8.9 ft. draft; and 94.31 tons tonnage.

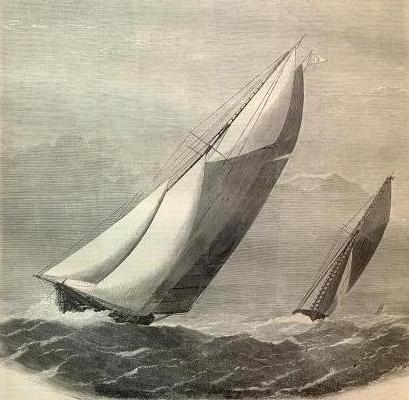
Yachts Fleetwing & Henrietta

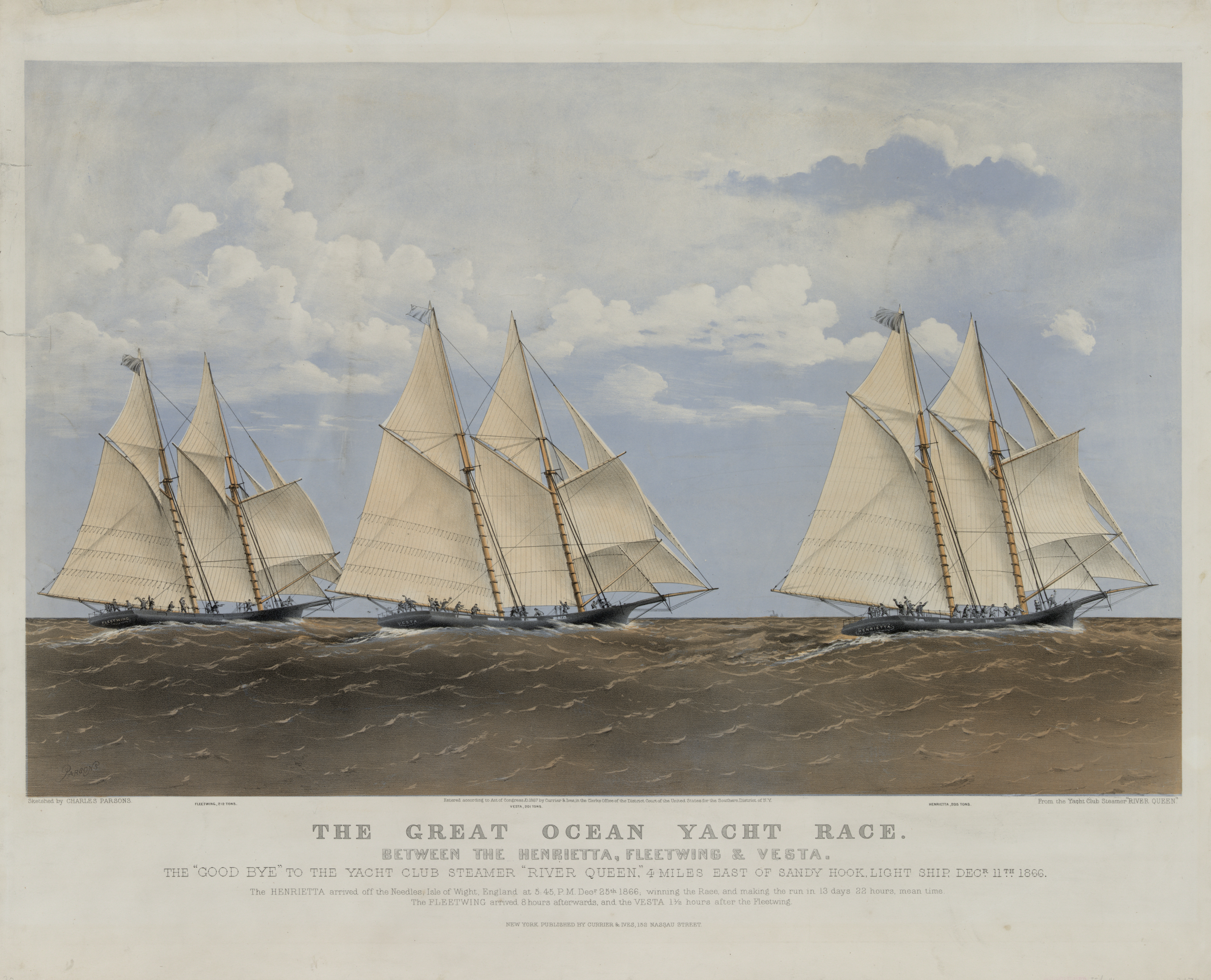
Yachts Henrietta, Fleetwing & Vesta

Van Deusen went to William H. Webb's ship-building academy. He then went into business with his brother James De Witt, under the firm name of J. D. and J. B. Van Deusen. They built some notable yachts like the Columbia, which was the second defender of the America's Cup, the Fleur de Lis, and the Fleeting, which sailed in the first ocean race against the Henrietta and Vesta. They also built the pilot boat John D. Jones in December 1859.

On June 28, 1869, the yacht Fleur de Lis went from New York for a cruise eastward.

On May 21, 1872, Vice-Commodore Dickerson of the Brooklyn Yacht Club took the schooner-yacht Fleur de Lis to be fitted out by David Carll of City Island. She also got an entire suit of canvass by J. M. Sawyer. Alterations were completed on June 10, 1872.

On August 28, 1872, Vice-Commodore Dickerson took a large party of ladies and gentlemen on the Fleur de Lis, to see the a race between the Maude and the W. F. Davide. The race started in the position alongside of the Fleur de Lis.

Pilot Franklin B. Wellock purchased and sailed the Fleur de Lis as a pilot boat for two years, then sold her to parties that converted her into a pleasure yacht out of Boston.

On June 20, 1876, Arthur Cheney of the Globe Theatre arrived from New York on the yacht Fleur de Lis and went to East Boston. She was said to be "one of the finest models afloat."

On September 6, 1876, Cheney and the yacht Fleur de Lis came into collision with the tug boat John Bacon, off Governors Island. The yacht was towed to East Boston for repairs.

On May 20, 1878, Cheney's yacht Fleur de Lis went into commission after being stored for the winter. She was anchored off City Point.

On June 30, 1878, Irish actor and playwright Dion Boucicault purchased the Fleur de Lis from Arthur Cheney for $7,500. She was 80 feet long and 94 tons.

On Dec 24, 1882, the schooner Martha C, ran into Fleur de Lis No. 7 in Gloucester, Massachusetts. The damages to the pilot boat were for $50, which was paid by the owners of the schooner.

On June 27, 1887, Albert Everson bought Arthur Cheney's yacht Fleur de Lis from the Hichborn & Co. auction for $550. She was known as "one of the best pilot boats in the Boston harbor."

On April 6, 1888, the yacht Fleur de Lis, of the Atlantic Yacht Club, took down a large party to witness a race between the Carrie E. Phillips, L. J. Merritt, Jr., and others. The Fleur de Lis was flying the pennant of the Atlantic Yacht Club.

On September 13, 1891, Captain Alfred Sorensen owner and pilot of the Boston yacht Fleur de Lis took a party of quests out fishing when she was run into by the steamer Cumberland. The passengers were safely taken off the yacht and she was repaired. Sorensen was reported as owning the yacht from 1891 to 1895.

== End of service ==
On September 25, 1897, the schooner Fleur de Lis sank at the Commercial wharf in Boston. Thieves had cut away a lead pipe connected to the boat.

On February 7, 1904, the pilot boat Fleur de Lis was in a graveyard for boats in East Boston. She was used by Daniel Webster, a lawyer and statesman; Edwin Booth, an actor; Edwin Forrest, a Shakespearean actor, and many other prominent men.

== See also ==
- List of Northeastern U.S. pilot boats
