= Thomas H. Willis =

American painter (1890-1895)

- Born: Thomas H. Willis; January 1, 1845; Denmark
- Died: June 1, 1925 (aged 80); Seal Beach, California
- Known for: Marine art, folk art, needlework
- Style: Realism
- Spouse: Mary McDonald
- Children: 6

Thomas H. Willis (1845-June 1, 1925) was a Danish-born American artist who combined marine art, folk art, and needlework in his portraits of American and European sailing ships, steamers, pilot boats and yachts. His works are represented in maritime museums including the Mystic Seaport Maritime Museum, The Peabody Museum of Salem in Massachusetts and The Mariners' Museum and Park in Newport News, Virginia. He died in New York City in 1925.

== Early life ==
Willis was born in Denmark as was his father. He migrated to New York and by 1870 was living in Brooklyn, New York.

== Career ==
In 1870, Willis worked in New York City for a manufacturer of silk embroidery threadmaker. His works featured oil painted backgrounds with vessels constructed of silk, velvet, and embroidery floss. He specialized in marine art, folk art, and needlework in his portraits of American and European sailing ships, steamers, pilot boats and yachts. He advertised himself as the "inventor and sole maker of silkware pictures." He received commissions from sea captains, ship companies and members of the New York Yacht Club.

He collaborated with Danish-born American maritime artist Antonio Jacobsen, who was said to have painted sections of water in some of Willis' paintings. His understanding of ships' rigging is reflected in his paintings. His works are usually signed with a cipher consisting of the initial "T" over a larger letter "W", giving the idea of a stylized anchor.

His works are represented in maritime museums including the Mystic Seaport Maritime Museum, The Peabody Museum of Salem in Massachusetts, the Mariners' Museum and Park in Newport News, Virginia and The Civico Museo Marinaro Gio Bono Ferrari in Camogli, in Italy.

== Death ==
Willis died on June 1, 1925, in New York City.

== Gallery ==
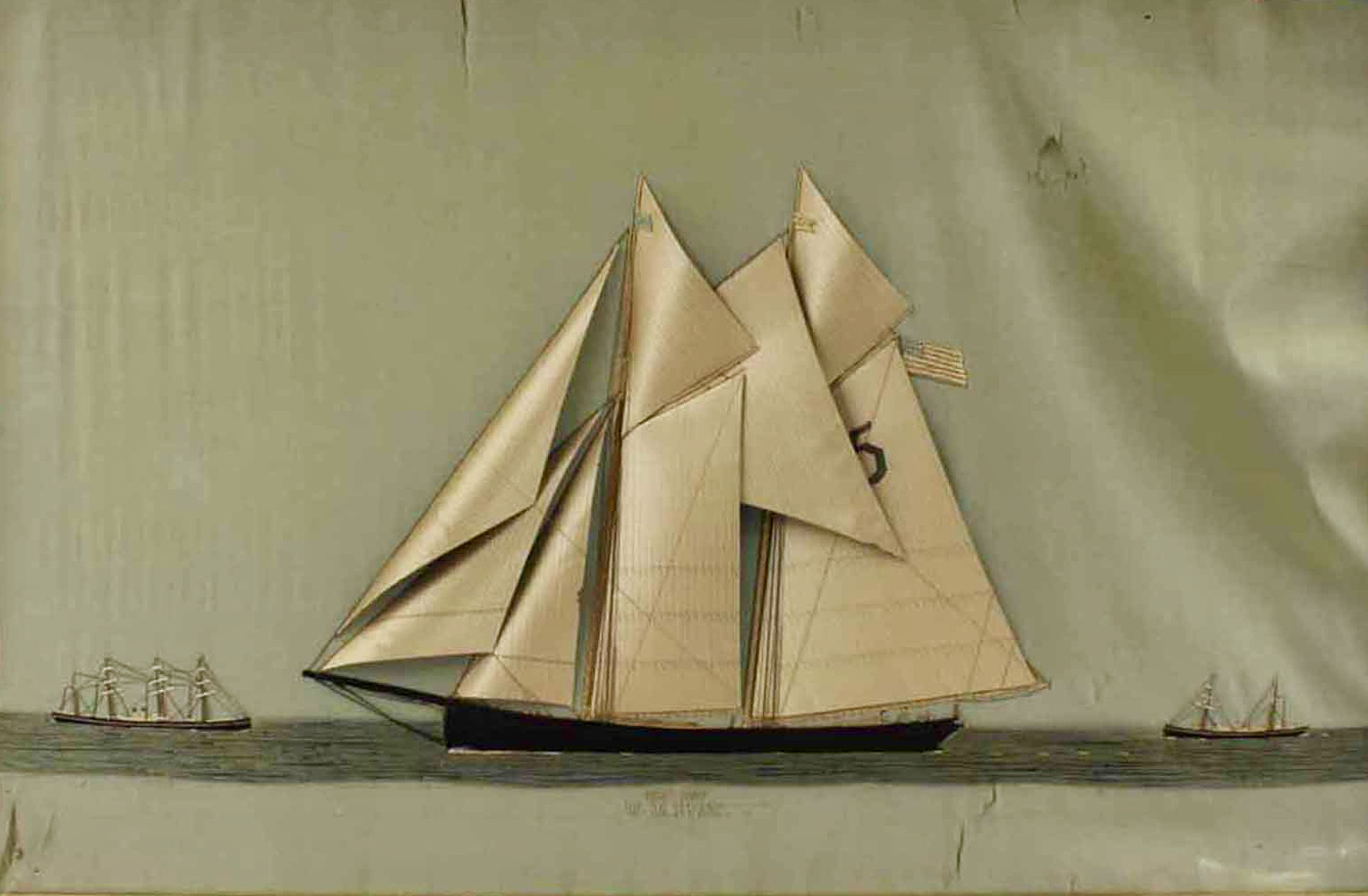
W. W. Story

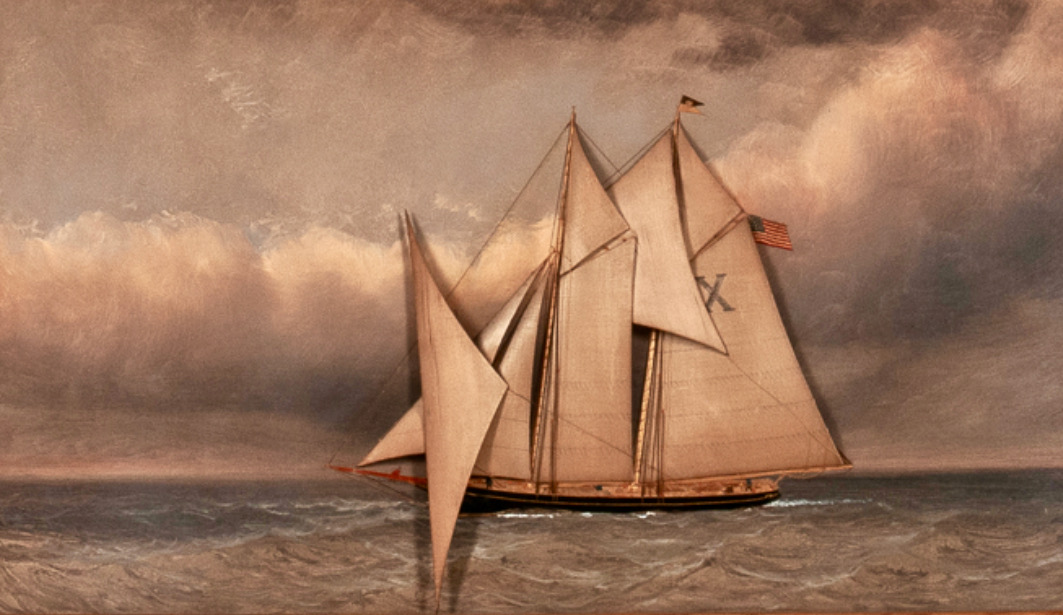
The Jesse Carll pilot-boat, silk and paint on canvas.

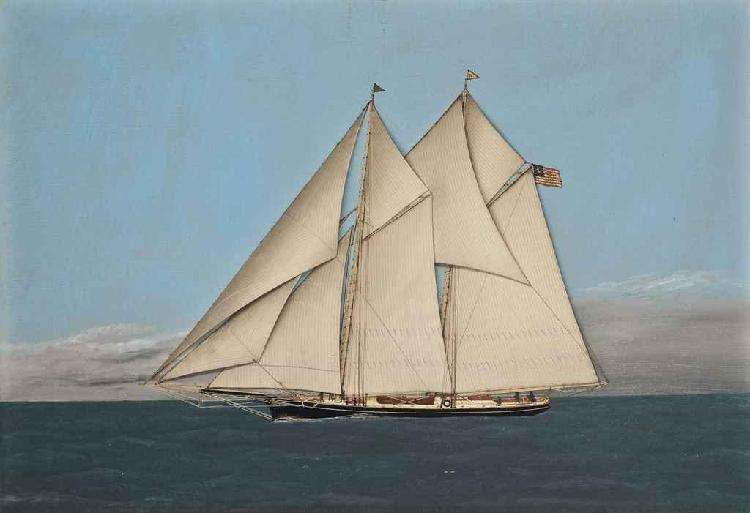
American Schooner Magic

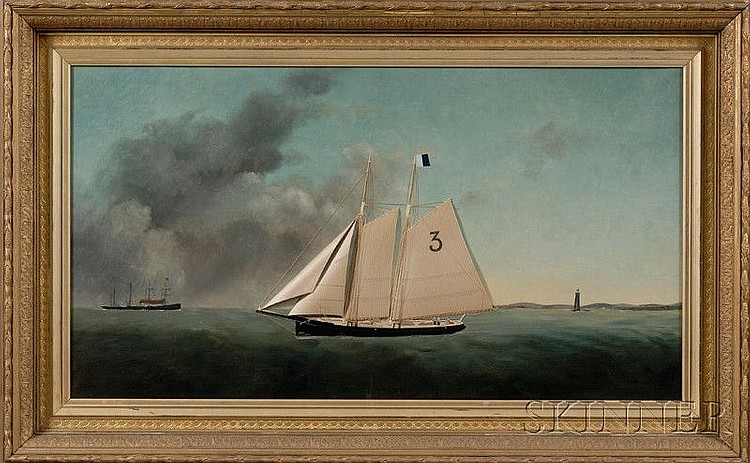
Boston pilot boat D. J. Lawlor

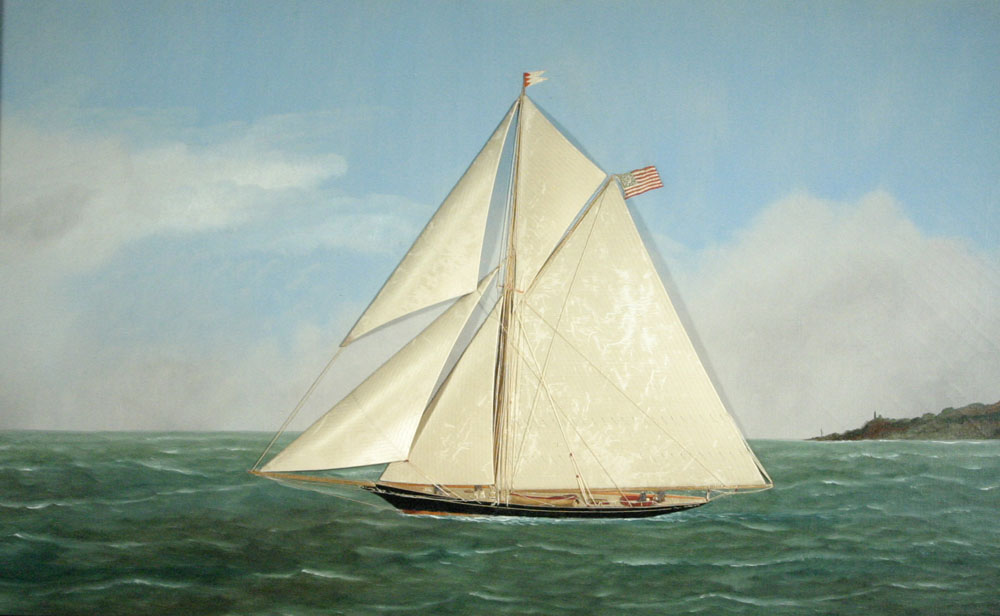
Yacht Liris, New York Sloop
