= Thomas B. Jackson =

American politician (1797–1881)

Member of the U.S. House of Representatives from New York's 1st district
- In office March 4, 1837 – March 3, 1841
- Preceded by: Abel Huntington
- Succeeded by: Charles A. Floyd

Personal details
- Born: March 24, 1797 Jerusalem, New York
- Died: April 23, 1881 (aged 84) Flushing, Queens, New York City, New York
- Party: Democratic

Thomas Birdsall Jackson (March 24, 1797 – April 23, 1881) was an American lawyer and politician who served two terms as a U.S. representative from New York from 1837 to 1841.

== Biography ==
Born in Jerusalem (now part of Nassau County) on Long Island, New York, Jackson attended the public schools. He engaged in agricultural pursuits. He studied law. He was admitted to the bar and practiced in Jerusalem, Hempstead, and Newtown, New York.

=== Family ===
Thomas married Marie Coles and had three known children: Samuel, Andrew and William. Thomas descends from the prominent Jackson family of Hempstead, New York.

=== Congress ===
Jackson was elected county judge in 1832. He served as member of the State assembly 1833–1835. He moved to Newtown, Long Island, in 1835. He served as a Justice of the Peace. Jackson was elected as a Democrat to the Twenty-fifth and Twenty-sixth Congresses (March 4, 1837 – March 3, 1841). He was not a candidate for renomination in 1840.

=== Later career and death ===
He resumed agricultural pursuits. He died in Newtown (now Elmhurst Station), Flushing, Long Island, New York, April 23, 1881. He was interred in Flushing Cemetery.

== Sources ==
- United States Congress. "Thomas B. Jackson (id: J000027)". Biographical Directory of the United States Congress.

U.S. House of Representatives
Preceded by Abel Huntington	Member of the U.S. House of Representatives from New York's 1st congressional district 1837–1841	Succeeded by Charles A. Floyd
