= St. Andrew's Church (Staten Island) =

Episcopal church in Staten Island, New York

- Church of St. Andrew (Episcopal)
- U.S. National Register of Historic Places
- New York City Landmark
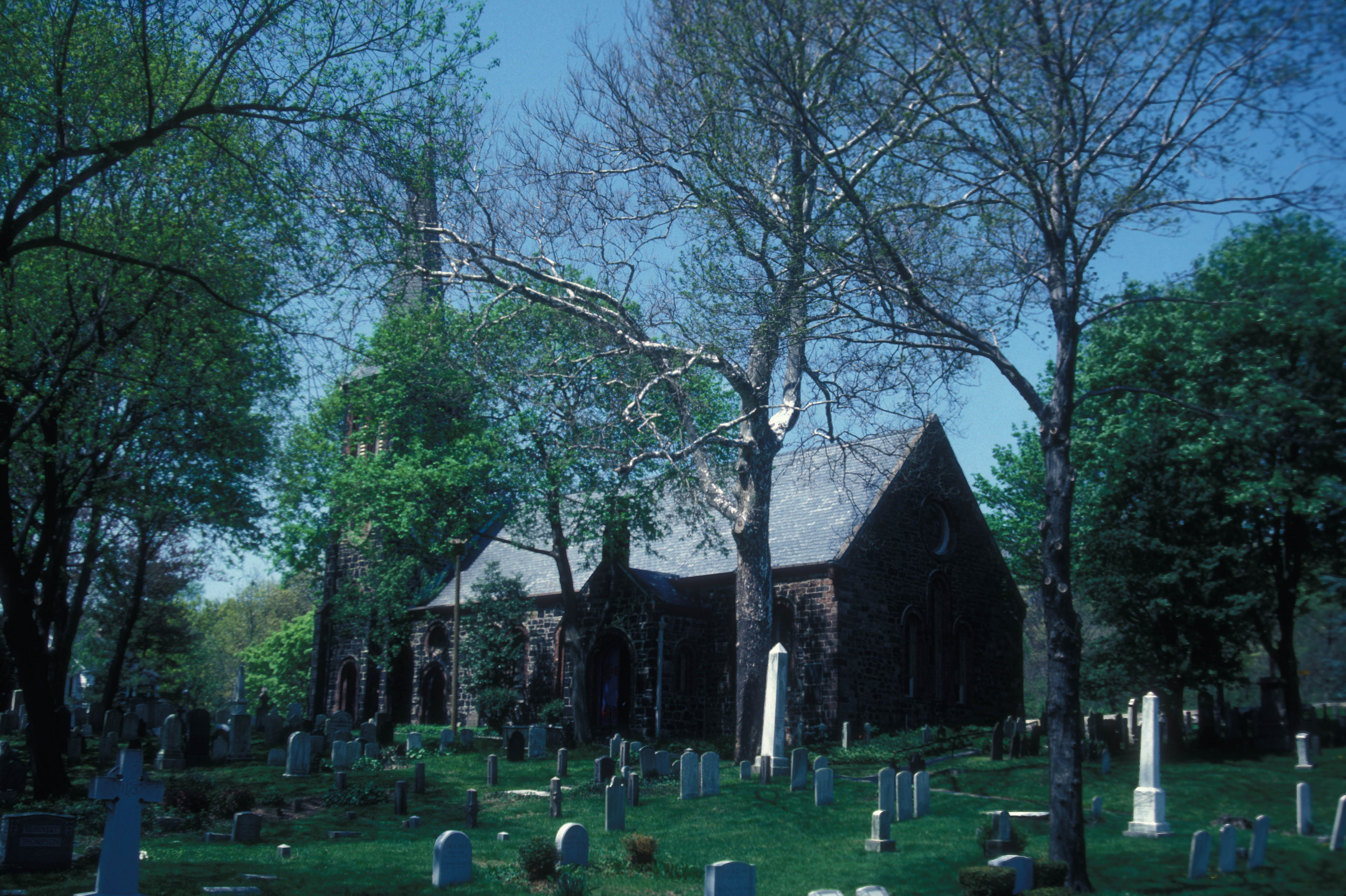

- Location within New York City Location within New York Location within the United States
- Location: Arthur Kill and Old Mill Rds., Staten Island, New York
- Coordinates: 40°34′22.3″N 74°8′50.5″W
- Area: 2 acres (0.81 ha)
- Built: 1872
- Architect: George Mersereau
- Architectural style: Romanesque, Norman Romanesque
- NRHP reference No.: 82005078
- NYCL No.: 0399

Significant dates
- Added to NRHP: October 6, 2000
- Designated NYCL: November 15, 1967

The Church of St. Andrew is a historic Episcopal church located at Arthur Kill and Old Mill Roads on the north side of Richmondtown in Staten Island, New York.

The congregation was founded in 1708. The first church was built in 1708–1712 and expanded in 1770. The church was used as a hospital by the British during the American Revolutionary War, and later was heavily damaged by fire in 1867 and 1872. The church was rebuilt about 1872 in a Gothic style of fieldstone with stop-ended chamfered red brick trim. The attached Burch Hall was erected in 1924 in a matching style.

It was designated a New York City landmark in 1967 and added to the National Register of Historic Places in 2000. The 1818 rectory is listed on the National Register of Historic Places as the Moore-McMillen House.

== Cemetery and notable burials ==
The churchyard contains the graves of several prominent Staten Island families, including a number of Woods, and a prominent mausoleum to the Johnston Family. Other notable burials include:

- Rev. Richard Charlton (1705–1777), one of the church's earliest rectors and the maternal grandfather of Elizabeth Ann Seton, the first native-born citizen of the United States to be canonized by the Roman Catholic Church. Mother Seton's brother and sister are also buried here.
- Capt. Timothy Green Benham (1793–1860), Navy Commander and father of Admiral Andrew E. K. Benham.
- Obadiah Bowne (1822–1874), member of the 32nd United States Congress and a presidential elector.
- Richard Bayley (1745–1801), first chief health officer of New York City and father of Elizabeth Ann Seton.
- Henry Crocheron (1772–1819), member of the 14th United States Congress.
- Jacob Crocheron (1774–1849), member of the 21st United States Congress.
- James Guyon Jr. (1778–1846), member of the New York State Assembly and the 16th United States Congress.

== See also ==
- List of New York City Designated Landmarks in Staten Island
- National Register of Historic Places listings in Richmond County, New York
