= George Townsend (politician) =

American politician

Member of the U.S. House of Representatives from New York's 1st district
- In office March 4, 1815 – March 3, 1819 Serving with Henry Crocheron (1815–17); Tredwell Scudder (1817–19)
- Preceded by: John Lefferts; Ebenezer Sage
- Succeeded by: Silas Wood; James Guyon, Jr.

Personal details
- Born: December 21, 1768 Lattingtown, Province of New York, British America
- Died: August 17, 1844 (aged 75) Lattingtown, New York, U.S.
- Party: Democratic-Republican
- Spouse: Deborah Cock

George Townsend (December 21, 1768 – August 17, 1844) was a U.S. representative from New York.

== Early life ==
Townsend was born on December 21, 1768 in Lattingtown, township of Oyster Bay in what was then the Province of New York, a part of British America. He was the first son of Prior Townsend (1749–1803) and Sarah (née Feake) Townsend (1750–1833). Among his siblings was Jacob Townsend, Hannah Townsend, Deborah Townsend and Hannah Townsend.

== Career ==
Townsend engaged in agricultural pursuits.

Townsend was elected as a Democratic-Republican to the Fourteenth and Fifteenth Congresses, serving from March 4, 1815 to March 3, 1819.

== Personal life ==
Townsend was married to Deborah Cock (1776–1854), a daughter of Daniel Cock and Rosanna (née Townsend) Cock. Together, they were the parents of two boys:

- James Cock Townsend (1797–1882), a physician who married Anne S. Valentine, daughter of Hon. Richard Valentine. After Anne's death in 1836, he married Margaret Elizabeth Townsend (1809–1879), a daughter of William Townsend, in 1838.
- George Prior Townsend (1815–1854), who married Anna Frost in 1838, a daughter of Jervis Frost. After George's death, his widow married John W. Somarindyck.

He died in Lattingtown, township of Oyster Bay, New York, August 17, 1844.

=== Descendants ===
Through his son James, he was a grandfather of Julia M. Townsend (1842–1896), who married George Faile Valentine (1844–1891).

U.S. House of Representatives
Preceded by John Lefferts, Ebenezer Sage	Member of the U.S. House of Representatives from New York's 1st congressional district 1815–1819 with Henry Crocheron 1815–17, and Tredwell Scudder 1817–19	Succeeded by Silas Wood, James Guyon, Jr.
