= Henry Crocheron =

American politician

Member of the U.S. House of Representatives from New York's 1st district
- In office March 4, 1815 – March 4, 1817
- Preceded by: John Lefferts; Ebenezer Sage
- Succeeded by: Tredwell Scudder; George Townsend

Personal details
- Born: December 26, 1772 Staten Island, Province of New York, British America
- Died: November 8, 1819 (aged 46) Staten Island, New York, U.S.
- Party: Democratic-Republican

Henry Crocheron (December 26, 1772 – November 8, 1819) was a U.S. representative from New York, brother of Jacob Crocheron.

Born in Richmond County, New York, Crocheron attended the common schools. He engaged in mercantile pursuits in Northfield. He was the Supervisor of Northfield from 1808 to 1814.

Crocheron was elected as a Democratic-Republican to the Fourteenth Congress (March 4, 1815 – March 4, 1817). He served as captain of militia in 1818. He died in New Springville neighborhood of Staten Island on November 8, 1819. He was interred in St. Andrew's Churchyard, Richmond County, Staten Island, New York.

U.S. House of Representatives
Preceded by John Lefferts, Ebenezer Sage	Member of the U.S. House of Representatives from New York's 1st congressional district 1815–1817 with George Townsend	Succeeded by Tredwell Scudder, George Townsend
