= New York's 1st congressional district =

U.S. House district for New York

- Interactive map of district boundaries since January 3, 2025
- Representative: Nick LaLota; R–Amityville
- Distribution: 94.94% urban; 5.06% rural
- Population (2025): 792,717
- Median household income: $136,151
- Ethnicity: 72.3% White; 14.9% Hispanic; 5.1% Asian; 4.3% Black; 2.7% Two or more races; 0.7% other
- Cook PVI: R+4

New York's 1st congressional district is a congressional district for the United States House of Representatives in eastern Long Island. It includes the eastern two-thirds of Suffolk County, including the northern portion of Brookhaven, as well as the entirety of the towns of Huntington, Smithtown, Riverhead, Southold, Southampton, East Hampton, and Shelter Island. The district encompasses extremely wealthy enclaves such as the Hamptons, middle class suburban towns such as Selden, Centereach, and Lake Grove, working-class towns such as Riverhead and rural farming communities such as Mattituck and Jamesport on the North Fork. The district currently is represented by Republican Nick LaLota. It is the fifth wealthiest congressional district in New York state and the 21st wealthiest district in the United States, with 28.9 percent of households earning over $200,000, per a 2024 study.

The district has been a swing district since the 1990s and a Republican-leaning seat since the 2010s. President George W. Bush defeated challenger John Kerry by less than one percentage point in 2004, while in 2008 and 2012, Barack Obama won the district by less than five points. In 2012, New York underwent redistricting, and the 1st district was slightly modified. In the 2014 election, Republican Lee Zeldin defeated Democratic incumbent Tim Bishop, who had represented the district since 2003. Donald Trump won the district by 12 percentage points over Hillary Clinton in the 2016 presidential election. At the same time, Zeldin won a second term, defeating Democratic challenger Anna-Thone Holst by a margin of 15.6%, the largest margin of victory for a Republican since 1998.

In 2018, Zeldin won re-election to a third term, narrowly defeating Democratic challenger Perry Gershon by 4.1%. In 2020, the district shifted back in the Democratic direction, with Trump carrying the district by only four points in the 2020 United States presidential election. In 2022, Republican Nick LaLota defeated Democrat Bridget Fleming in the newly-redrawn district by a 10-point margin.

== Voter registration ==
Voter registration and party enrollment as of February 20, 2025
Party	Active voters	Inactive voters	Total voters	Percentage
Republican	192,722	6,952	199,674	32.85%
Democratic	184,799	6,691	191,490	31.50%
Conservative	11,573	436	12,009	1.98%
Working Families	1,907	48	1,955	0.32%
Other	18,117	231	18,348	3.02%
Unaffiliated	177,651	6,773	184,424	30.34%
Total	586,769	21,131	607,900	100%

== Recent election results from statewide races ==
Year	Office	Results
2008	President	Obama 50% - 48%
2012	President	Romney 51% - 49%
2016	President	Trump 53% - 43%
2016	Senate	Schumer 58% - 40%
2018	Senate	Gillibrand 53% - 47%
2018	Governor	Cuomo 50% - 48%
2018	Attorney General	James 50% - 48%
2020	President	Trump 50% - 48%
2022	Senate	Pinion 55% - 44%
2022	Governor	Zeldin 58% - 42%
2022	Attorney General	Henry 57% - 43%
2022	Comptroller	Rodríguez 54% - 46%
2024	President	Trump 54% - 44%
2024	Senate	Sapraicone 53% - 47%

== Components: past and present ==
1823–1945:

All of Suffolk, Nassau
Parts of Queens

1945–1963:

All of Suffolk
Parts of Nassau

1963–Present:

Parts of Suffolk

== Current counties and towns ==
For the 119th and successive Congresses (based on the districts drawn following the New York Court of Appeals' December 2023 decision in Hoffman v New York State Ind. Redistricting. Commn.), the district contains all or portions of the following counties and towns.

Suffolk County (8)

Brookhaven (part; also 2nd; includes Belle Terre, Center Moriches, Centereach, Coram, East Moriches, East Setauket, East Shoreham, Farmingville, Gordon Heights, Lake Grove, Lake Ronkonkoma, Manorville, Middle Island, Miller Place, Moriches, Mount Sinai, Old Field, Poquott, Port Jefferson, Port Jefferson Station, Ridge, Rocky Point, Selden, Setauket, Shoreham, Sound Beach, Stony Brook, Stony Brook University, Terryville, and part of Calverton, Eastport, Fire Island, Holbrook, Holtsville, Medford, and Yaphank), East Hampton, Huntington (part; also 3rd; includes Asharoken, Centerport, Dix Hills, East Northport, Eatons Neck, Elwood, Greenlawn, Melville, Northport, South Huntington, and part of Commack, Fort Salonga, Huntington (CDP), Huntington Station, and West Hills), Riverhead, Shelter Island, Smithtown, Southampton, Southold

== List of members representing the district ==
=== 1789–1813: one seat ===
Member	Party	Years	Cong ress	Electoral history	District counties
District established March 4, 1789
William Floyd (Brookhaven)	Anti-Administration	March 4, 1789 – March 3, 1791	1st	Elected in 1789. Lost re-election.	1789–1793; Kings; Queens; Richmond; Suffolk
Vacant		March 4, 1791 – May 1791	2nd	Representative-elect James Townsend died May 24, 1790, before his term began.	1789–1793; Kings; Queens; Richmond; Suffolk
Thomas Tredwell (Smithtown)	Anti-Administration	May 1791 – March 3, 1795	2nd 3rd	Elected April 28, 1791 to finish Townsend's term. Re-elected in 1793. Moved to the 7th district and lost re-election.	1789–1793; Kings; Queens; Richmond; Suffolk
Thomas Tredwell (Smithtown)	Anti-Administration	May 1791 – March 3, 1795	2nd 3rd	Elected April 28, 1791 to finish Townsend's term. Re-elected in 1793. Moved to the 7th district and lost re-election.	1793–1801; Kings; Queens; Suffolk
Jonathan Nicoll Havens (Shelter Island)	Democratic-Republican	March 4, 1795 – October 25, 1799	4th 5th 6th	Elected in 1794. Re-elected in 1796. Re-elected in 1798. Died.	1793–1801; Kings; Queens; Suffolk
Vacant		October 25, 1799 – February 27, 1800	6th		1793–1801; Kings; Queens; Suffolk
John Smith (Mastic Beach)	Democratic-Republican	February 27, 1800 – February 23, 1804	6th 7th 8th	Elected to finish Havens's term and seated February 27, 1800. Re-elected in 1800. Re-elected in 1802. Resigned.	1793–1801; Kings; Queens; Suffolk
John Smith (Mastic Beach)	Democratic-Republican	February 27, 1800 – February 23, 1804	6th 7th 8th	Elected to finish Havens's term and seated February 27, 1800. Re-elected in 1800. Re-elected in 1802. Resigned.	1801–1803; Kings; Queens; Richmond; Suffolk
John Smith (Mastic Beach)	Democratic-Republican	February 27, 1800 – February 23, 1804	6th 7th 8th	Elected to finish Havens's term and seated February 27, 1800. Re-elected in 1800. Re-elected in 1802. Resigned.	1803–1809; Queens; Suffolk
Vacant		February 23, 1804 – November 5, 1804	8th		1803–1809; Queens; Suffolk
Samuel Riker (Newtown)	Democratic-Republican	November 5, 1804 – March 3, 1805	8th	Elected to finish Smith's term. [data missing]	1803–1809; Queens; Suffolk
Eliphalet Wickes (Jamaica)	Democratic-Republican	March 4, 1805 – March 3, 1807	9th	Elected in 1804. [data missing]	1803–1809; Queens; Suffolk
Samuel Riker (Newtown)	Democratic-Republican	March 4, 1807 – March 3, 1809	10th	Elected in 1806. [data missing]	1803–1809; Queens; Suffolk
Ebenezer Sage (Sag Harbor)	Democratic-Republican	March 4, 1809 – March 3, 1813	11th 12th	Elected in 1808. Re-elected in 1810.	1809–1813; Kings; Queens; Suffolk

=== 1813–1823: two seats ===
From 1809 to 1823, two seats were apportioned, elected at-large on a general ticket.

Years	Cong ress	Seat A			Seat B			Location
Years	Cong ress	Member	Party	Electoral history	Member	Party	Electoral history	Location
March 4, 1813 – March 3, 1815	13th	John Lefferts (Brooklyn)	Democratic-Republican	Elected in 1812. [data missing]	Ebenezer Sage (Sag Harbor)	Democratic-Republican	Re-elected in 1812. [data missing]	1813–1823; 1st and 2nd Ward of New York County, and Kings, Queens, Suffolk and Richmond counties.
March 4, 1815 – March 3, 1817	14th	Henry Crocheron (Castletown)	Democratic-Republican	Elected in 1814. [data missing]	George Townsend (Oyster Bay)	Democratic-Republican	Elected in 1814	1813–1823; 1st and 2nd Ward of New York County, and Kings, Queens, Suffolk and Richmond counties.
March 4, 1817 – March 3, 1819	15th	Tredwell Scudder (Islip)	Democratic-Republican	Elected in 1816. Retired.	George Townsend (Oyster Bay)	Democratic-Republican	Re-elected in 1816. [data missing]	1813–1823; 1st and 2nd Ward of New York County, and Kings, Queens, Suffolk and Richmond counties.
March 4, 1819 – January 14, 1820	16th	Silas Wood (Huntington)	Federalist	Elected in 1818. Re-elected in 1821. Became the sole representative from the district in 1823.	Vacant		Credentials had been issued for Ebenezer Sage (Dem.-Rep.), but Sage did not take or claim the seat, see 1818 United States House of Representatives elections in New York	1813–1823; 1st and 2nd Ward of New York County, and Kings, Queens, Suffolk and Richmond counties.
January 14, 1820 – March 3, 1821	16th	Silas Wood (Huntington)	Federalist	Elected in 1818. Re-elected in 1821. Became the sole representative from the district in 1823.	James Guyon Jr. (Richmond)	Democratic-Republican	Successfully contested the election of Ebenezer Sage. [data missing]	1813–1823; 1st and 2nd Ward of New York County, and Kings, Queens, Suffolk and Richmond counties.
March 4, 1821 – December 12, 1821	17th	Silas Wood (Huntington)	Federalist	Elected in 1818. Re-elected in 1821. Became the sole representative from the district in 1823.	Vacant		Credentials had been issued for Peter Sharpe (Dem.-Rep.), but Sharpe did not take or claim the seat, see 1821 United States House of Representatives elections in New York	1813–1823; 1st and 2nd Ward of New York County, and Kings, Queens, Suffolk and Richmond counties.
December 12, 1821 – March 3, 1823	17th	Silas Wood (Huntington)	Federalist	Elected in 1818. Re-elected in 1821. Became the sole representative from the district in 1823.	Cadwallader D. Colden (New York)	Federalist	Successfully contested the election of Peter Sharpe. [data missing]	1813–1823; 1st and 2nd Ward of New York County, and Kings, Queens, Suffolk and Richmond counties.

=== 1823–present: one seat ===
Member	Party	Years	Cong ress	Electoral history	District location
Silas Wood (Huntington)	Federalist	March 4, 1823 – March 3, 1829	18th 19th 20th	Re-elected in 1822. Re-elected in 1824. Re-elected in 1826. Lost re-election.	1823–1833; Queens and Suffolk counties.
Silas Wood (Huntington)	Anti-Jacksonian	March 4, 1823 – March 3, 1829	18th 19th 20th	Re-elected in 1822. Re-elected in 1824. Re-elected in 1826. Lost re-election.	1823–1833; Queens and Suffolk counties.
James Lent (Newtown)	Jacksonian	March 4, 1829 – February 22, 1833	21st 22nd	Elected in 1828. Re-elected in 1830. Died.	1823–1833; Queens and Suffolk counties.
Vacant		February 22, 1833 – March 3, 1833	22nd		1823–1833; Queens and Suffolk counties.
Abel Huntington (East Hampton)	Jacksonian	March 4, 1833 – March 3, 1837	23rd 24th	Elected in 1832. Re-elected in 1834. Lost re-election.	1833–1843 [data missing]
Thomas B. Jackson (Newtown)	Democratic	March 4, 1837 – March 3, 1841	25th 26th	Elected in 1836. Re-elected in 1838. Retired.	1833–1843 [data missing]
Charles A. Floyd (Commack)	Democratic	March 4, 1841 – March 3, 1843	27th	Elected in 1840. [data missing]	1833–1843 [data missing]
Selah B. Strong (Setauket)	Democratic	March 4, 1843 – March 3, 1845	28th	Elected in 1842. Retired.	1843–1853 [data missing]
John W. Lawrence (Flushing)	Democratic	March 4, 1845 – March 3, 1847	29th	Elected in 1844. Retired.	1843–1853 [data missing]
Frederick W. Lord (Greenport)	Democratic	March 4, 1847 – March 3, 1849	30th	Elected in 1846. [data missing]	1843–1853 [data missing]
John Alsop King (Jamaica)	Whig	March 4, 1849 – March 3, 1851	31st	Elected in 1848. [data missing]	1843–1853 [data missing]
John G. Floyd (Mastic )	Democratic	March 4, 1851 – March 3, 1853	32nd	Elected in 1850. [data missing]	1843–1853 [data missing]
James Maurice (Maspeth)	Democratic	March 4, 1853 – March 3, 1855	33rd	Elected in 1852. Retired.	1853–1863 [data missing]
William Valk (Flushing)	Know Nothing	March 4, 1855 – March 3, 1857	34th	Elected in 1854. Lost re-election.	1853–1863 [data missing]
John A. Searing (Hempstead Branch)	Democratic	March 4, 1857 – March 3, 1859	35th	Elected in 1856. Retired.	1853–1863 [data missing]
Luther C. Carter (Flushing)	Republican	March 4, 1859 – March 3, 1861	36th	Elected in 1858. Lost re-election.	1853–1863 [data missing]
Edward H. Smith (Smithtown)	Democratic	March 4, 1861 – March 3, 1863	37th	Elected in 1860. Retired.	1853–1863 [data missing]
Henry G. Stebbins (New Brighton)	Democratic	March 4, 1863 – October 24, 1864	38th	Elected in 1862. Resigned.	1863–1873 [data missing]
Vacant		October 24, 1864 – December 5, 1864	38th		1863–1873 [data missing]
Dwight Townsend (Clifton)	Democratic	December 5, 1864 – March 3, 1865	38th	Elected to finish Stebbins's term. [data missing]	1863–1873 [data missing]
Stephen Taber (Roslyn)	Democratic	March 4, 1865 – March 3, 1869	39th 40th	Elected in 1864. Re-elected in 1866. [data missing]	1863–1873 [data missing]
Henry A. Reeves (Greenport)	Democratic	March 4, 1869 – March 3, 1871	41st	Elected in 1868. [data missing]	1863–1873 [data missing]
Dwight Townsend (Stapleton)	Democratic	March 4, 1871 – March 3, 1873	42nd	Elected in 1870. [data missing]	1863–1873 [data missing]
Henry J. Scudder (New York)	Republican	March 4, 1873 – March 3, 1875	43rd	Elected in 1872. Retired.	1873–1885 [data missing]
Henry B. Metcalfe (Westfield)	Democratic	March 4, 1875 – March 3, 1877	44th	Elected in 1874. [data missing]	1873–1885 [data missing]
James W. Covert (Flushing)	Democratic	March 4, 1877 – March 3, 1881	45th 46th	Elected in 1876. Re-elected in 1878. [data missing]	1873–1885 [data missing]
Perry Belmont (Babylon)	Democratic	March 4, 1881 – December 1, 1888	47th 48th 49th 50th	Elected in 1880. Re-elected in 1882. Re-elected in 1884. Re-elected in 1886. Resigned to become U.S. Minister to Spain.	1873–1885 [data missing]
Perry Belmont (Babylon)	Democratic	March 4, 1881 – December 1, 1888	47th 48th 49th 50th	Elected in 1880. Re-elected in 1882. Re-elected in 1884. Re-elected in 1886. Resigned to become U.S. Minister to Spain.	1885–1893; Queens County, Richmond County, and Suffolk County
Vacant		December 1, 1888 – March 3, 1889	50th		1885–1893; Queens County, Richmond County, and Suffolk County
James W. Covert (Long Island City)	Democratic	March 4, 1889 – March 3, 1895	51st 52nd 53rd	Elected in 1888. Re-elected in 1890. Re-elected in 1892. [data missing]	1885–1893; Queens County, Richmond County, and Suffolk County
James W. Covert (Long Island City)	Democratic	March 4, 1889 – March 3, 1895	51st 52nd 53rd	Elected in 1888. Re-elected in 1890. Re-elected in 1892. [data missing]	1893–1903; Queens County and Suffolk County
Richard C. McCormick (Jamaica)	Republican	March 4, 1895 – March 3, 1897	54th	Elected in 1894. Retired.	1893–1903; Queens County and Suffolk County
Joseph M. Belford (Riverhead)	Republican	March 4, 1897 – March 3, 1899	55th	Elected in 1896. Retired.	1893–1903; Queens County and Suffolk County
Townsend Scudder (Oyster Bay)	Democratic	March 4, 1899 – March 3, 1901	56th	Elected in 1898. Retired.	1893–1903; Queens County and Suffolk County
Frederic Storm (Queens)	Republican	March 4, 1901 – March 3, 1903	57th	Elected in 1900. Lost re-election.	1893–1903; Queens County and Suffolk County
Townsend Scudder (Glen Head)	Democratic	March 4, 1903 – March 3, 1905	58th	Elected in 1902. Retired.	1903–1913; Queens County (partial), Suffolk County, and Nassau County
William W. Cocks (Westbury)	Republican	March 4, 1905 – March 3, 1911	59th 60th 61st	Elected in 1904. Re-elected in 1906. Re-elected in 1908. Lost re-election.	1903–1913; Queens County (partial), Suffolk County, and Nassau County
Martin W. Littleton (Port Washington)	Democratic	March 4, 1911 – March 3, 1913	62nd	Elected in 1910. Retired.	1903–1913; Queens County (partial), Suffolk County, and Nassau County
Lathrop Brown (St. James)	Democratic	March 4, 1913 – March 3, 1915	63rd	Elected in 1912. Lost re-election.	1913–1933 [data missing]
Vacant		March 4, 1915 – January 4, 1916	64th	The 1914 election, which was decided by only 10 votes, was tied up in the courts until December 1915.	1913–1933 [data missing]
Frederick C. Hicks (Port Washington)	Republican	January 4, 1916 – March 3, 1923	64th 65th 66th 67th	Elected in 1914. Re-elected in 1916. Re-elected in 1918. Re-elected in 1920. Retired.	1913–1933 [data missing]
Robert L. Bacon (Old Westbury)	Republican	March 4, 1923 – September 12, 1938	68th 69th 70th 71st 72nd 73rd 74th 75th	Elected in 1922. Re-elected in 1924. Re-elected in 1926. Re-elected in 1928. Re-elected in 1930. Re-elected in 1932. Re-elected in 1934. Re-elected in 1936. Died.	
Robert L. Bacon (Old Westbury)	Republican	March 4, 1923 – September 12, 1938	68th 69th 70th 71st 72nd 73rd 74th 75th	Elected in 1922. Re-elected in 1924. Re-elected in 1926. Re-elected in 1928. Re-elected in 1930. Re-elected in 1932. Re-elected in 1934. Re-elected in 1936. Died.	1933–1943 [data missing]
Vacant		September 12, 1938 – January 3, 1939	75th		1933–1943 [data missing]
Leonard W. Hall (Oyster Bay)	Republican	January 3, 1939 – January 3, 1945	76th 77th 78th	Elected in 1938. Re-elected in 1940. Re-elected in 1942. Redistricted to the 2nd congressional district.	1933–1943 [data missing]
Leonard W. Hall (Oyster Bay)	Republican	January 3, 1939 – January 3, 1945	76th 77th 78th	Elected in 1938. Re-elected in 1940. Re-elected in 1942. Redistricted to the 2nd congressional district.	1943–1953 [data missing]
Edgar A. Sharp (Patchogue)	Republican	January 3, 1945 – January 3, 1947	79th	Elected in 1944. Retired.	1943–1953 [data missing]
W. Kingsland Macy (Islip)	Republican	January 3, 1947 – January 3, 1951	80th 81st	Elected in 1946. Re-elected in 1948. Lost re-election.	1943–1953 [data missing]
Ernest Greenwood (Bay Shore)	Democratic	January 3, 1951 – January 3, 1953	82nd	Elected in 1950. Lost re-election.	1943–1953 [data missing]
Stuyvesant Wainwright (Wainscott)	Republican	January 3, 1953 – January 3, 1961	83rd 84th 85th 86th	Elected in 1952. Re-elected in 1954. Re-elected in 1956. Re-elected in 1958. Lost re-election.	1953–1963 [data missing]
Otis G. Pike (Riverhead)	Democratic	January 3, 1961 – January 3, 1979	87th 88th 89th 90th 91st 92nd 93rd 94th 95th	Elected in 1960. Re-elected in 1962. Re-elected in 1964. Re-elected in 1966. Re-elected in 1968. Re-elected in 1970. Re-elected in 1972. Re-elected in 1974. Re-elected in 1976. Retired.	1953–1963 [data missing]
Otis G. Pike (Riverhead)	Democratic	January 3, 1961 – January 3, 1979	87th 88th 89th 90th 91st 92nd 93rd 94th 95th	Elected in 1960. Re-elected in 1962. Re-elected in 1964. Re-elected in 1966. Re-elected in 1968. Re-elected in 1970. Re-elected in 1972. Re-elected in 1974. Re-elected in 1976. Retired.	1963–1973 [data missing]
Otis G. Pike (Riverhead)	Democratic	January 3, 1961 – January 3, 1979	87th 88th 89th 90th 91st 92nd 93rd 94th 95th	Elected in 1960. Re-elected in 1962. Re-elected in 1964. Re-elected in 1966. Re-elected in 1968. Re-elected in 1970. Re-elected in 1972. Re-elected in 1974. Re-elected in 1976. Retired.	1973–1983 [data missing]
William Carney (Hauppauge)	Conservative	January 3, 1979 – October 7, 1985	96th 97th 98th 99th	Elected in 1978. Re-elected in 1980. Re-elected in 1982. Re-elected in 1984. Changed parties. Retired.	1973–1983 [data missing]
William Carney (Hauppauge)	Republican	October 7, 1985 – January 3, 1987	96th 97th 98th 99th	Elected in 1978. Re-elected in 1980. Re-elected in 1982. Re-elected in 1984. Changed parties. Retired.	1983–1993 [data missing]
George J. Hochbrueckner (Coram)	Democratic	January 3, 1987 – January 3, 1995	100th 101st 102nd 103rd	Elected in 1986. Re-elected in 1988. Re-elected in 1990. Re-elected in 1992. Lost re-election.	1983–1993 [data missing]
George J. Hochbrueckner (Coram)	Democratic	January 3, 1987 – January 3, 1995	100th 101st 102nd 103rd	Elected in 1986. Re-elected in 1988. Re-elected in 1990. Re-elected in 1992. Lost re-election.	1993–2003 [data missing]
Michael Forbes (Quogue)	Republican	January 3, 1995 – July 17, 1999	104th 105th 106th	Elected in 1994. Re-elected in 1996. Re-elected in 1998. Lost renomination.	1993–2003 [data missing]
Michael Forbes (Quogue)	Democratic	July 17, 1999 – January 3, 2001	104th 105th 106th	Elected in 1994. Re-elected in 1996. Re-elected in 1998. Lost renomination.	1993–2003 [data missing]
Felix Grucci (Brookhaven)	Republican	January 3, 2001 – January 3, 2003	107th	Elected in 2000. Lost re-election.	1993–2003 [data missing]
Tim Bishop (Southampton)	Democratic	January 3, 2003 – January 3, 2015	108th 109th 110th 111th 112th 113th	Elected in 2002. Re-elected in 2004. Re-elected in 2006. Re-elected in 2008. Re-elected in 2010. Re-elected in 2012. Lost re-election.	2003–2013
Tim Bishop (Southampton)	Democratic	January 3, 2003 – January 3, 2015	108th 109th 110th 111th 112th 113th	Elected in 2002. Re-elected in 2004. Re-elected in 2006. Re-elected in 2008. Re-elected in 2010. Re-elected in 2012. Lost re-election.	2013–2023
Lee Zeldin (Shirley)	Republican	January 3, 2015 – January 3, 2023	114th 115th 116th 117th	Elected in 2014. Re-elected in 2016. Re-elected in 2018. Re-elected in 2020. Retired to run for Governor of New York.	2013–2023
Nick LaLota (Amityville)	Republican	January 3, 2023 – present	118th 119th	Elected in 2022. Re-elected in 2024. Re-elected in 2026.	2023–2025
Nick LaLota (Amityville)	Republican	January 3, 2023 – present	118th 119th	Elected in 2022. Re-elected in 2024. Re-elected in 2026.	2025–present

== Recent election results ==
New York State is one of only eight states where candidates can run for office under the banner of more than one party, and New York is the only state where such cross-endorsement (often called electoral fusion), regularly occurs. The passage of the Wilson Pakula Act in the state legislature in 1947 established this electoral process in New York. Candidates for office routinely run with the endorsement of a major political party as well as one or two other minor parties. Some parties merely exist as a vessel for an individual candidate, while others are formally organized and are regularly found on the ballot. In determining an election winner, the votes for a candidate are totaled across all the party lines on a ballot on which a candidate is running. The results below present in table form the total votes received for each candidate across all party lines and also identify the candidate's major party affiliation.

U.S. House of Representatives election, 1996: New York District 1
Party	Candidate	Votes	%	±%
Republican	Michael P. Forbes (Incumbent)	116,620	54.7	
Democratic	Nora L. Bredes	96,496	45.3	
Majority		20,124	9.4	
Turnout		213,116	100	

22,390 Blank/Scattered/Void votes not included in the above totals. Michael P. Forbes vote by party line: Republican Party (90,001), Conservative Party (11,962), Independence Party (6,599) and Right-To-Life Party (8,058). Nora L. Bredes vote by party line: Democratic Party (93,816), Save Medicare (2,680).

U.S. House of Representatives election, 1998: New York District 1
Party	Candidate	Votes	%	±%
Republican	Michael P. Forbes (Incumbent)	99,460	64.1	▲9.4
Democratic	William G. Holst	55,630	35.9	▼9.4
Majority		43,830	28.3	▲18.9
Turnout		155,090	100	▼27.2

20,242 Blank/Scattered/Voided votes not included in above totals. Michael P. Forbes vote by party line: Republican Party (75,643), Conservative Party (13,032), Independence Party (3,158) and Right to Life Party (7,627). William G. Hoist vote by party line: Democratic Party (54,463), STO Party (1,167).

U.S. House of Representatives election, 2000: New York District 1
Party	Candidate	Votes	%	±%
Republican	Felix Grucci	133,020	55.5	▼8.6
Democratic	Regina Seltzer	97,299	40.6	▲4.7
None	Michael P. Forbes (Incumbent)	6,318	2.6	▲2.6
Green	William G. Holst	2,967	1.2	▲1.2
Majority		35,721	14.9	▼13.4
Turnout		239,604	100	▲54.5

U.S. House of Representatives election, 2002: New York District 1
Party	Candidate	Votes	%	±%
Democratic	Timothy H. Bishop	84,276	50.2	▲9.6
Republican	Felix Grucci (Incumbent)	81,524	48.6	▼6.9
Green	Lorna Salzman	1,991	1.2	0.0
Majority		2,752	1.6	▼13.3
Turnout		167,791	100	▼30.0

U.S. House of Representatives election, 2004: New York District 1
Party	Candidate	Votes	%	±%
Democratic	Timothy H. Bishop (Incumbent)	156,354	56.2	▲6.0
Republican	William M. Manger, Jr.	121,855	43.8	▼4.8
Majority		34,499	12.4	▲10.8
Turnout		278,209	100	▲65.8

U.S. House of Representatives election, 2006: New York District 1
Party	Candidate	Votes	%	±%
Democratic	Timothy H. Bishop (Incumbent)	104,360	62.2	▲6.0
Republican	Italo Zanzi	63,328	37.8	▼6.0
Majority		41,032	24.5	▲12.1
Turnout		167,688	100	▼39.7

U.S. House of Representatives election, 2008: New York District 1
Party	Candidate	Votes	%	±%
Democratic	Timothy H. Bishop (Incumbent)	162,083	58.4	▼3.8
Republican	Lee M. Zeldin	115,545	41.6	▲3.8
Majority		46,538	16.8	▼7.7
Turnout		277,628	100	▲65.6

U.S. House of Representatives election, 2010: New York District 1
Party	Candidate	Votes	%	±%
Democratic	Timothy H. Bishop (Incumbent)	98,316	50.2	▼8.2
Republican	Randy Altschuler	97,723	49.8	▲8.2
Majority		593	0.4	▼16.4
Turnout		196,039	100	▼29.4

U.S. House of Representatives election, 2012: New York District 1
Party	Candidate	Votes	%	±%
Democratic	Timothy H. Bishop (Incumbent)	132,525	52.2	▲2.0
Republican	Randy Altschuler	121,478	47.8	▼2.0
Majority		11,047	4.3	▲3.9
Turnout		254,003	100	▲22.8

U.S. House of Representatives election, 2014: New York District 1
Party	Candidate	Votes	%	±%
Republican	Lee Zeldin	94,035	53.2	▲5.4
Democratic	Timothy H. Bishop (Incumbent)	78,722	44.6	▼7.6
Majority		15,313	8.6	▲4.3
Turnout		176,719	100	▼30.4

U.S. House of Representatives election, 2016: New York District 1
Party	Candidate	Votes	%	±%
Republican	Lee Zeldin (Incumbent)	188,499	58.2	▲2.0
Democratic	Anna Throne-Holst	135,278	41.8	▼5.0
Majority		53,221	15.6	▲7.0
Turnout		341,554	100	▲93.3

U.S. House of Representatives election, 2018: New York District 1
Party	Candidate	Votes	%	±%
Republican	Lee Zeldin (Incumbent)	139,027	51.5	▼3.7
Democratic	Perry Gershon	127,991	47.4	▲7.8
Majority		12,036	4.1	▼11.5
Turnout		270,006	100	▼73.1

U.S. House of Representatives election, 2020: New York District 1
Party	Candidate	Votes	%	±%
Republican	Lee Zeldin (Incumbent)	205,714	54.86	▲3.36
Democratic	Nancy Goroff	169,294	45.14	▼2.26
Majority		36,420	9.72	▲5.62
Turnout		375,116	100	▲38.9

U.S. House of Representatives election, 2022: New York District 1
Party	Candidate	Votes	%	±%
Republican	Nick LaLota	177,040	55.5	▲0.6
Democratic	Bridget Fleming	141,907	44.49	▼0.6
Majority		35,133	11.0	▲1.2
Turnout		318,995	100	▼14.9

U.S. House of Representatives election, 2024: New York District 1
Party	Candidate	Votes	%	±%
Republican	Nick LaLota (Incumbent)	226,285	55.20	▼0.3
Democratic	John Avlon	183,540	44.78	▲0.29
Majority		42,745	10.43	▼0.57
Turnout		409,825	100	▲28.49

== See also ==
- List of United States congressional districts
- New York's congressional delegations
- New York's congressional districts
