= Charles A. Floyd =

American politician

Member of the U.S. House of Representatives from New York's 1st district
- In office March 4, 1841 – March 3, 1843
- Preceded by: Thomas B. Jackson
- Succeeded by: Selah B. Strong

Personal details
- Born: 1791 Smithtown, New York
- Died: February 20, 1873 (aged 81–82) Commack, New York
- Party: Democratic

Charles Albert Floyd (1791 – February 20, 1873) was an American lawyer and politician who served one term as a U.S. representative from New York from 1841 to 1843.

== Biography ==
Born in Smithtown, New York, Charles A. Floyd attended the common schools. He engaged in agricultural pursuits. He served as Suffolk County clerk in 1820 and 1821. He then studied law, and was admitted to the bar. He served as district attorney in 1830 and served as member of the New York State Assembly in 1836 and 1838. He served as president of the board of trustees of Huntington from 1837 to 1840.

=== Congress ===
Floyd was elected as a Democrat to the Twenty-seventh Congress (March 4, 1841 – March 3, 1843).

=== Later career and death ===
After his term in the House of Representatives, he became county judge of Suffolk County and Town supervisor of Huntington 1843–1865. He resumed agricultural pursuits. Floyd was elected Master of Suffolk Masonic Lodge No. 60 in Port Jefferson, New York five times (1818–20, 1824–25), and a founding member of Jephtha Masonic Lodge No. 494 in Huntington, New York in 1860.

Floyd was a founding member of the reorganized Suffolk No 401 in Port Jefferson in 1856 and was elected Jephtha’s first Secretary. The son of John Floyd, a member from Long Island’s first masonic lodge Huntington No. 26 A.Y.M., and charter member of Suffolk No 60 in 1796. He died in Commack, Long Island, New York on February 20, 1873.

He was interred in the Methodist Church Cemetery.

U.S. House of Representatives
Preceded by Thomas B. Jackson	Member of the U.S. House of Representatives from New York's 1st congressional district 1841–1843	Succeeded by Selah B. Strong
