= John Lefferts =

American politician

Member of the U.S. House of Representatives from New York's 1st district
- In office March 4, 1813 – March 3, 1815
- Preceded by: Ebenezer Sage
- Succeeded by: Henry Crocheron

Personal details
- Born: December 17, 1785 Brooklyn, New York City, New York
- Died: September 18, 1829 (aged 43) Brooklyn, New York City, New York
- Party: Democratic-Republican

John Lefferts (December 17, 1785 – September 18, 1829) was a member of the Thirteenth United States Congress as a Democratic-Republican Representative from New York. He was also a delegate to the New York State Constitutional Convention of 1821 and a member of the New York State Senate from 1820 to 1825. He died in Brooklyn, New York and was interred in Greenwood Cemetery.

U.S. House of Representatives
Preceded by Ebenezer Sage	Member of the U.S. House of Representatives from New York's 1st congressional district 1813–1815 with Ebenezer Sage	Succeeded by Henry Crocheron, George Townsend
New York State Senate
Preceded by new district	New York State Senate; First District (Class 3); 1823–1825	Succeeded by Joshua Smith
