= Tredwell Scudder =

American politician

Member of the U.S. House of Representatives from New York's 1st district
- In office March 4, 1817 – March 3, 1819
- Preceded by: Henry Crocheron
- Succeeded by: Silas Wood

Personal details
- Born: January 1, 1778 Islip, New York
- Died: October 31, 1834 (aged 56) Islip, New York
- Party: Democratic-Republican

Tredwell Scudder (January 1, 1778 – October 31, 1834) was a U.S. representative from New York.

== Career ==
Town supervisor of Islip in 1795, 1796, and 1804–1815. He served as member of the State assembly in 1802, 1810, 1811, 1814, and 1815. Scudder was elected as a Democratic-Republican to the Fifteenth Congress (March 4, 1817 – March 3, 1819). He was not a candidate for renomination in 1818. He resumed agricultural pursuits. He again served in the State assembly in 1822 and 1828. Her returned as town supervisor of Islip from 1824 to 1833. He died in Islip, New York, October 31, 1834. He was interred in that village.

== Sources ==
- United States Congress. "Tredwell Scudder (id: S000203)". Biographical Directory of the United States Congress.

U.S. House of Representatives
Preceded by Henry Crocheron, George Townsend	Member of the U.S. House of Representatives from New York's 1st congressional district 1817–1819 with George Townsend	Succeeded by Silas Wood, James Guyon, Jr.
