= Jesse Carll (shipbuilder) =

American shipbuilder

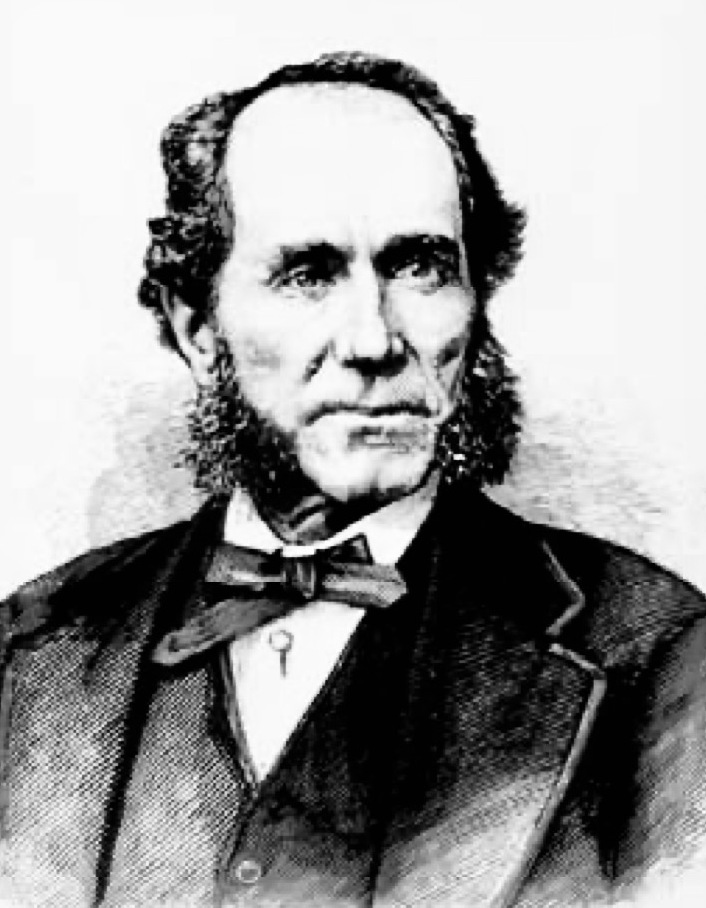
- Jesse Carll (1832-1902), shipbuilder.
- Born: March 12, 1832; Northport, New York, US
- Died: October 24, 1902 (aged 70); Northport, New York, US
- Occupation: shipbuilder
- Spouse: Anna Eliza Jarvis
- Children: 7

Jesse Carll (March 12, 1832 – October 24, 1902) was a 19th-century American shipbuilder in Northport, New York. He was a shipbuilder on Long Island who built yachts and schooners. Carll built the popular schooner pilot-boat Jesse Carll, named in his honor. He died on October 24, 1902, in Northport, at 72 years old. His brother, had the David Carll's shipyard, which was the first commercial shipyard built in City Island.

== Career ==
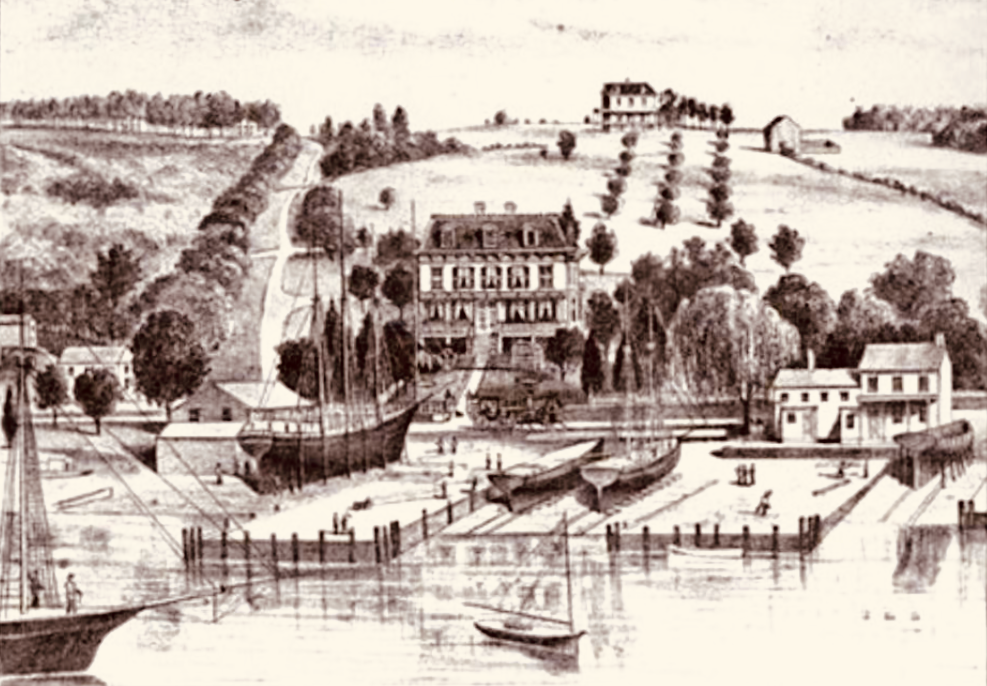
Residence & Shipyard of Jesse Carll by Edward Lange (1882).

In 1849, when he was 17 years old, he and his brother David Carll apprenticed under James and Lloyd Bayles shipbuilders of Port Jefferson, New York. In 1854, he and his brother David Carll, began shipbuilding in Northport under the firm name D & J. Carl. They built the 650-ton bark Storm Bird, costing $35,000, which put them into debt. They dissolved the partnership in 1865. David Carll built his shipyard in City Island and continued with the business until he retired in 1885.

Jesse Carll continued with his shipyard in Northport under the name Jesse Carll. He built yachts, pilot-boats and brigs, including the 1,100-ton bark Mary Greenwood, (1880) the schooner Joseph Budd, (1871) and the pilot-boat Jesse Carll (1885), named in honor of the shipbuilder.

By 1891, there were only three shipbuilders in Northport. By 1900, the Jesse Carll shipyard was the only one that remained in the village.

Carll started and was a director of the Pennington County Bank in Rapid City and the Custer County Bank of South Dakota. He was a founding member of Jephtha Masonic Lodge No. 494 in Huntington, New York, in 1860 and Alcyone Lodge No. 695 in Northport, New York, in 1869.

== Death ==
Carll died on October 24, 1902, in Northport, New York, at 72 years old as was one of the prominent shipbuilders of Long Island. At the time of his death his wife (Ann Carll), two daughters (Hannah Burr and Maud Wright), two sons (Jesse Jr. and Benjamin W.), and brother (Edward Carll) survived him. His funeral was at the family residence. He was buried at the Northport Rural Cemetery.

Carll's son, Jesse Jr. took over the shipyard business after his father died in 1902. During World War I, the shipyard was leased to a company that constructed flat-bottomed scows for the United States Navy. During the 1920s, shipbuilding stopped and the property was given to Northport and made into a park.

== See also ==
- David Carll
- List of Northeastern U. S. Pilot Boats
- List of sailboat designers and manufacturers
