= James Lent =

American politician

Member of the U.S. House of Representatives from New York's 1st district
- In office March 4, 1829 – February 22, 1833
- Preceded by: Silas Wood
- Succeeded by: Abel Huntington

Personal details
- Born: 1782 Newtown, New York
- Died: February 22, 1833 (aged 50–51) Washington, D.C.
- Resting place: Presbyterian Cemetery, Newtown, Long Island, New York
- Party: Democratic

James Lent (1782 – February 22, 1833) was an American politician who served two terms as a U.S. representative from New York from 1829 to 1833.

== Biography ==
Born in Newtown, New York (now a part of the Borough of Queens), Lent engaged in mercantile pursuits in New York City. He served as judge of Queens County and served from February 5, 1823, to March 4, 1829.

=== Congress ===
Lent was elected as a Jacksonian to the Twenty-first and Twenty-second Congresses and served from March 4, 1829, until his death in Washington, D.C., February 22, 1833.

He served as chairman of the Committee on Expenditures in the Department of State (Twenty-second Congress).

=== Death ===
He died on February 22, 1833, and was originally interred in the Congressional Cemetery. He was reinterred in the Presbyterian Cemetery, Newtown, Long Island, New York.

== See also ==
- List of members of the United States Congress who died in office (1790–1899)

== Sources ==
- United States Congress. "James Lent (id: L000242)". Biographical Directory of the United States Congress.

U.S. House of Representatives
Preceded by Silas Wood	Member of the U.S. House of Representatives from New York's 1st congressional district 1829–1833	Succeeded by Abel Huntington
