= James Guyon Jr. =

American politician (1778–1846)

Member of the U.S. House of Representatives from New York's 1st district
- In office January 14, 1820 – March 3, 1821
- Preceded by: George Townsend
- Succeeded by: Cadwallader D. Colden

Personal details
- Born: December 24, 1778 Richmond County, New York
- Died: March 9, 1846 (aged 67) Richmond County, New York
- Party: Democratic-Republican

James Guyon Jr. (December 24, 1778 – March 9, 1846 Staten Island) was an American politician from New York.

== Life ==
He was the son of James Guyon (b. 1746) and Susannah Guyon. The Guyon family was of French Protestant descent. James Guyon Jr. was married three times: first to Ann Bedell; second to Ann Perine; and third to Martha Seguine.

Guyon Jr. was appointed captain of the Second Squadron, First Division of Cavalry, in 1807. He represented Richmond County as a member of the New York State Assembly in 1812–1814. He was promoted to the rank of major in 1814, and in 1819 colonel of the First Regiment of Horse Artillery.

In the United States House of Representatives elections in New York, 1818, Guyon Jr. received a larger number of votes, but Ebenezer Sage was declared elected because part of the vote was returned for "James Guyon" (omitting "Jr."). Sage did not take or claim the seat, and Guyon Jr. successfully contested the election. He was seated on January 14, 1820, in the 16th United States Congress, and held office until March 3, 1821. Afterwards he engaged in farming. His half-brother Harmanus "Harry" Guyon also served in the New York State Assembly (1819–1820).

James Jr. was interred in St. Andrew's Cemetery on Staten Island. The family's local legacy includes James's nearby Guyon Tavern (c. 1820), and the landmarked Guyon-Lake-Tysen House (c. 1740), and the original Guyon-Clarke House (c. 1670) that stood until 1925 at the foot of today's Guyon Avenue.

U.S. House of Representatives
Preceded by Tredwell Scudder, George Townsend	Member of the U.S. House of Representatives from New York's 1st congressional district 1820–1821	Succeeded by Silas Wood, Cadwallader D. Colden
