= Turtle Playground (Queens) =

Public park in Queens, New York

Coordinates: 40.74216°N 73.827475°W

Turtle Playground, located at 138th Street and the south side of Horace Harding Expressway in Flushing, was acquired by the City of New York in 1954 as part of land condemnations for the Long Island Expressway.

The surrounding section of Flushing historically known as Queensboro Hill provided commanding views of its namesake borough prior to its development in the 1920s as a residential neighborhood. To the south of the playground, the Mount Hebron and Cedar Grove Cemeteries occupy the former Spring Hill estate of colonial governor Cadwallader Colden and his grandson Cadwallader David Colden, who served as Mayor of New York between 1818 and 1821. The estate was developed into a cemetery in 1893.

Originally titled Kiddy Playground, this .358-acre park was renamed Turtle Playground in 1997 by Parks Commissioner Henry J. Stern. The name was inspired by a recent renovation of the playground that included the installation of turtle play sculptures along with updated play equipment, swings and game tables. The snapping turtle is among the most resilient of the urban wildlife species dwelling within the City’s parks and can be found in the nearby lakes of Flushing Meadows-Corona Park and Kissena Park.
