= Cadwallader D. Colden =

American lawyer and politician (1769–1834)

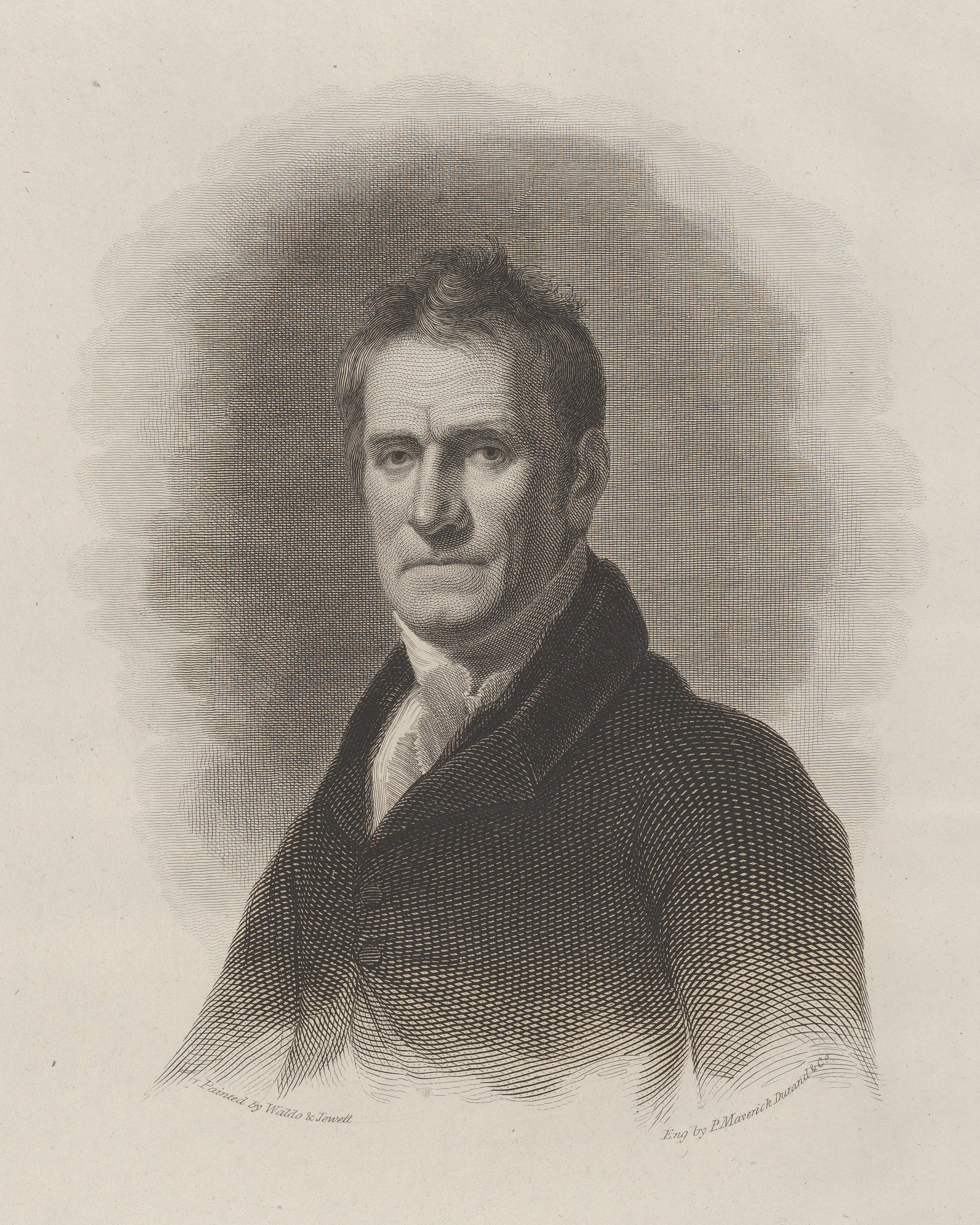

New York State Senate (1st District)
- In office 1825–1827

Member of the U.S. House of Representatives from New York's 1st district
- In office December 12, 1821 – March 3, 1823
- Preceded by: James Guyon, Jr.
- Succeeded by: Silas Wood

55th Mayor of New York City
- In office 1818–1821
- Governor: DeWitt Clinton
- Preceded by: Jacob Radcliff
- Succeeded by: Stephen Allen

New York State Assembly
- In office 1818

District attorney (1st District)
- In office 1810–1811

Personal details
- Born: Cadwallader David Colden; April 4, 1769 Flushing, Province of New York, British America
- Died: February 7, 1834 (aged 64) Jersey City, New Jersey, U.S.
- Party: Federalist
- Spouse: Maria Provoost (m. 1793)
- Relations: Cadwallader Colden (grandfather)

Cadwallader David Colden (April 4, 1769 – February 7, 1834) was an American lawyer and politician who served as the 55th Mayor of New York City and a U.S. Representative from the State of New York.

== Early life ==
Colden was born at Spring Hill in Flushing, Queens, the family home, on April 4, 1769, in the Province of New York. He was the son of David Colden and Ann Alice (née Willett) Colden. He was the brother of Alice Christy Colden, Maria Colden, who married Josiah Ogden Hoffman, Elizabeth Colden, who married Edward Laight, and Catherine Colden, who married Thomas Cooper.

He was the grandson of Alice (née Chrystie) Colden and Cadwallader Colden, who served as the Governor of the Province of New York several times in the 1760s. He was taught by a private tutor and then provided a classical education in Jamaica, New York and London, Great Britain. After returning to the United States in 1785, he studied law and was admitted to the bar in 1791.

== Career ==
Coat of arms of Cadwallader D. Colden

Colden first practiced law in New York City, then moved to Poughkeepsie, New York in 1793. He returned to New York in 1796 and from 1798 to 1801, he was Assistant Attorney General for the First District, comprising Suffolk, Queens, Kings, Richmond, and Westchester counties. From 1810 to 1811, he was District Attorney of the First District, comprising the above-mentioned counties and New York County. In his time as an attorney, Colden argued for the defendant in the seminal property case Pierson v. Post.

Colden was an active Freemason. He was the Senior Grand Warden of the Grand Lodge of New York in 1801–1805 and 1810–1819.

He became a Colonel of Volunteers in the War of 1812. Despite having owned slaves, in 1815 he became president of the New York Manumission Society, established in 1785 to promote the abolition of slavery in the State of New York. He oversaw the rebuilding of the Society's African Free School in New York City. Later historians cited the energetic aid of Colden, Peter A. Jay, William Jay, Governor Daniel D. Tompkins, and others in influencing the New York legislature to set the date of July 4, 1827, for the abolition of slavery in New York.

Colden was also a member of the New York State Assembly in 1818, and the 55th Mayor of New York City from 1818 to 1821, appointed by Governor DeWitt Clinton. He successfully contested the election of Peter Sharpe to the 17th United States Congress and served from December 12, 1821, to March 3, 1823. He was a member of the New York State Senate (1st District) from 1825 to 1827, when he resigned.

After his resignation from the State Senate, he moved to Jersey City, New Jersey, where he devoted much of his time to the completion of the Morris Canal.

=== Literary accomplishments ===
A proponent of a national canal system, in 1825 Colden was commissioned by the Common Council of New York City, during the last days of the construction of the Erie Canal, to write his Memoir, Prepared at the Request of a Committee of the Common Council of the City of New York, and Presented to the Mayor of the City, at the Celebration of the Completion of the New York Canals. The work and its Appendix contain period lithographs of the canal construction and highlights of the "Grand Canal Celebration" in New York City.

== Personal life ==
On April 8, 1793, Colden was married to Maria Provoost (1770–1837), the daughter of Rt. Rev. Dr. Samuel Provoost, 1st bishop of the Episcopal Diocese of New York and 3rd presiding bishop consecrated for the Episcopal Church of the United States, and Maria Bousefield Provoost. Together, they were the parents of:

- David Cadwallader Colden (1797–1850), who married Francis Wilkes (1796–1877), daughter of banker Charles Wilkes and cousin of Rear Admiral Charles Wilkes.

== Death ==
Colden died in Jersey City, New Jersey, in 1834. His body was removed in 1843 from interment in New Jersey and moved to a receiving vault in Trinity Church Cemetery in Upper Manhattan, New York City. The vault was removed in 1845 and relocated to a prominent spot in the cemetery's Easterly Division, where it overlooks a rural intersection at Broadway and West 153rd Street. By 1869, preparations to widen Broadway, where the road cut through the cemetery, caused Colden to be removed to another plot in the cemetery's Westerly Division that was essentially forgotten until a local historian rediscovered it in July 2011.

== See also ==
- Abolitionism in the United States
- Freemasonry in the United States
- History of slavery in New York (state)
- List of United States representatives from New York

Legal offices
Preceded by Richard Riker	District Attorney of the First District; Kings, New York, Queens, Richmond, Suffolk, and Westchester counties 1810–1811	Succeeded by Richard Riker
Political offices
Preceded by Jacob Radcliff	Mayor of New York City; 1818–1821	Succeeded by Stephen Allen
U.S. House of Representatives
Preceded by James Guyon, Jr., Silas Wood	Member of the U.S. House of Representatives from New York's 1st congressional district 1821–1823 with Silas Wood	Succeeded by Silas Wood
