= Selah B. Strong =

American judge

Member of the U.S. House of Representatives from New York's 1st district
- In office March 4, 1843 – March 3, 1845
- Preceded by: Charles A. Floyd
- Succeeded by: John W. Lawrence

Personal details
- Born: Selah Brewster Strong; May 1, 1792 Brookhaven, New York
- Died: November 29, 1872 (aged 80) Setauket, New York
- Party: Democratic

Selah Brewster Strong (May 1, 1792 – November 29, 1872) was an American lawyer and politician from New York, serving one term in the U.S. House of Representatives from 1843 to 1845.

== Life ==
He was born on May 1, 1792 at Brookhaven, New York, the son of Judge Thomas Sheppard Strong and Hannah Brewster. His mother was the daughter of Joseph Brewster of Setauket and Rebecca Mills. She was also a descendant of Elder William Brewster (c. 1567 – April 10, 1644), the Pilgrim leader and spiritual elder of the Plymouth Colony and a passenger on the Mayflower, through his son Jonathan Brewster. (This lineage appeared in some genealogies of the Strong family. However, she was actually descended from Rev. Nathaniel Brewster of New Haven and his wife Sarah Ludlow. They died in the Town of Brookhaven.) She was also a descendant of Lt. Gov. Roger Ludlow.

His paternal grandmother was Anna Strong, the only female member of the Culper Ring, based in Setauket, NY.

He was also a descendant of Lion Gardiner, an early English settler and soldier in the New World, who founded the first English settlement in what became the state of New York. His legacy includes Gardiners Island which remains in the family and is the largest privately owned island in the United States. He graduated from Yale College in 1811. He studied law, was admitted to the bar in 1814, and commenced practice in New York City.

On August 14, 1823, he married Cornelia Udall, who was born at Islip on March 20, 1806, the daughter of Dr. Richard Udall and Prudence Carll, daughter of Silas Carll of Huntington, Long Island, New York. She was the sister of Richard Udall, who studied law under Strong.

=== War of 1812 ===
During the War of 1812 he was commissioned as an ensign and quartermaster in the 10th Regiment, Third Brigade, New York City and County Troops, and in 1815 was promoted successively to lieutenant and captain. He was master in chancery in 1817, moved to Brookhaven in 1820, and was District Attorney of Suffolk County from 1821 to 1847, except for nine months in 1830. He was appointed judge advocate of the First Division of the New York State Infantry in 1825.

=== Congress ===
He was elected as a Democrat to the 28th United States Congress, and served from March 4, 1843, to March 3, 1845. Afterwards he resumed the practice of law. In March 1846, he was appointed judge of the Second Judicial Circuit, but did not take office. He was a justice of the New York Supreme Court (2nd District] from 1847 to 1849 and from 1852 to 1859, and was ex officio a judge of the New York Court of Appeals in 1849 and 1859. He was a delegate to the New York State Constitutional Convention of 1867–68.

=== Death ===
He died at Setauket in 1872; interment was on his estate.

== Notes ==
U.S. House of Representatives
Preceded by Charles A. Floyd	Member of the U.S. House of Representatives from New York's 1st congressional district 1843–1845	Succeeded by John W. Lawrence
