= Ebenezer Sage =

American politician

Member of the U.S. House of Representatives from New York's 1st district
- In office March 4, 1809 – March 3, 1815
- Preceded by: Samuel Riker
- Succeeded by: George Townsend

Personal details
- Born: August 16, 1755 Chatham, Connecticut Colony, British America
- Died: January 20, 1834 (aged 78) Sag Harbor, New York, U.S.
- Party: Democratic-Republican
- Spouse: Ruth Smith
- Children: Frances Mary Sage; John Smith Sage
- Education: Yale College

Ebenezer Sage (August 16, 1755 – January 20, 1834) was a United States representative from New York.

== Early life ==
Sage was born in that part of the town of Chatham (which was later separated as the Town of Portland) in the Connecticut Colony. He was a son of David Sage, the first representative from Chatham to the General Assembly, serving from 1768 to 1775.

He received his early education from a private tutor and graduated from Yale College in 1778, the same class as Joel Barlow and Noah Webster. He studied medicine, and commenced practice in Easthampton, Suffolk County, New York, in 1784.

== Career ==
After practicing medicine in Easthampton for many years, he moved to Sag Harbor about 1801.

Sage was elected as a Democratic-Republican to the 11th, 12th and 13th United States Congresses, holding office from March 4, 1809, to March 3, 1815. In the election for the 16th United States Congress Sage appeared to win, but only because votes for his opponent, James Guyon, Jr., were split between James Guyon, Jr. and James Guyon. Credentials of his election to Congress were issued by the Secretary of State of New York but Sage did not claim or take the seat. Guyon successfully contested Sage's election and was seated on January 14, 1820.

=== Later life ===
Sage resumed the practice of medicine at Sag Harbor and was a delegate to the New York State Constitutional Convention of 1821.

=== Death ===
Sage died at Sag Harbor, Suffolk County, N.Y., January 20, 1834, at the age of 78. He was later buried at the Old Burying Ground.

== Personal life ==
Sage was married to Ruth Smith (1764–1831), a daughter of Ruth (née Howell) Smith and Dr. William "Bull" Smith of Southampton, a descendant of settler Richard Smith. Together, they were the parents of Frances Mary "Fanny" Sage (who married Dr. Lawton and settled in Mobile, Alabama) and John Smith Sage (1781–1882), who also became a doctor.

U.S. House of Representatives
Preceded by Samuel Riker	Member of the U.S. House of Representatives from New York's 1st congressional district 1809–1815; John Lefferts 1813–15	Succeeded by Henry Crocheron, George Townsend
