= Silas Wood =

American politician (1769–1847)

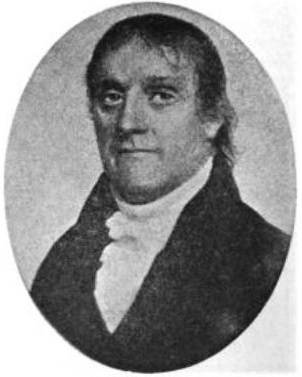

Member of the U.S. House of Representatives from New York's 1st district
- In office March 4, 1819 – March 3, 1829
- Preceded by: Tredwell Scudder
- Succeeded by: James Lent

Personal details
- Born: September 14, 1769 West Hills, Province of New York, British America
- Died: March 2, 1847 (aged 77) Huntington, New York, U.S.
- Party: Federalist; Adams-Clay Federalist; Adams

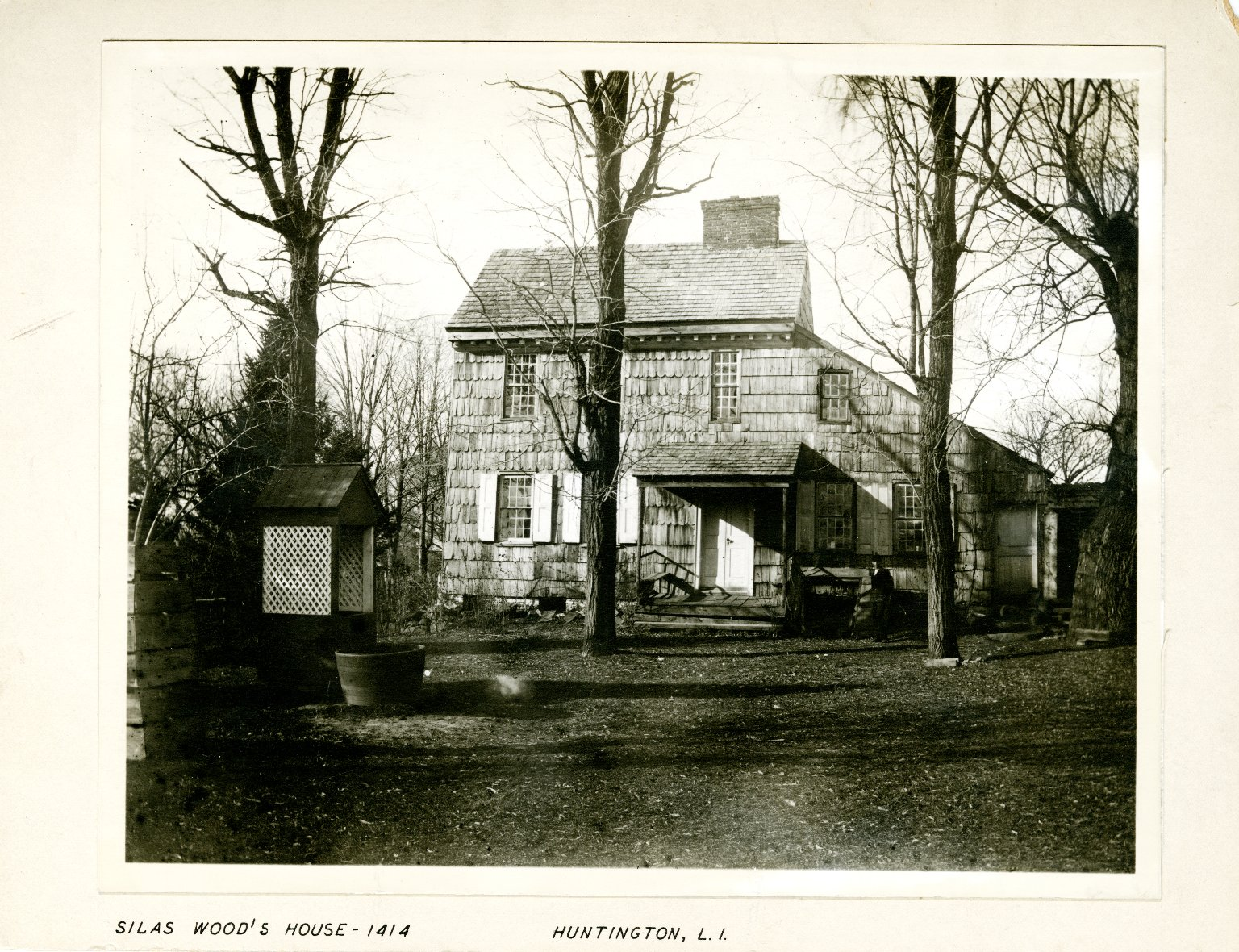
George Bradford Brainerd (American, 1845–1887). Silas Wood's House, Huntington, Long Island, ca. 1872–1887. Collodion silver glass wet plate negative. Brooklyn Museum

Silas Wood (September 14, 1769 – March 2, 1847) was a U.S. representative from New York.

Born in West Hills on Long Island in the Province of New York, Wood pursued classical studies. He graduated from Princeton College in 1789 and was a teacher at that institution during the five succeeding years. He studied law. He was admitted to the bar and commenced practice in Huntington, New York. He ran for Congress in 1799 and 1800 in New York's 1st congressional district, which he would eventually be elected to. He was appointed district attorney of Suffolk County in 1818 and 1821.

Wood was elected to the Sixteenth and to the four succeeding Congresses (March 4, 1819 – March 3, 1829). He served as chairman of the Committee on Expenditures in the Department of State (Seventeenth and Eighteenth Congresses). He was an unsuccessful candidate for reelection in 1828 to the Twenty-first Congress. He died in Huntington, New York, March 2, 1847. He was interred in the Old Public Cemetery on Main Street. Silas Wood Sixth Grade Center of South Huntington School District is named after Wood.

== Sources ==
- United States Congress. "Silas Wood (id: W000703)". Biographical Directory of the United States Congress.

U.S. House of Representatives
| Preceded by Tredwell Scudder, George Townsend | Member of the U.S. House of Representatives from New York's 1st congressional district 1819–1829 with James Guyon, Jr. 1820–21 and Cadwallader D. Colden 1821–23 | Succeeded by James Lent |
