= Jesse Carll =

New York Pilot boat

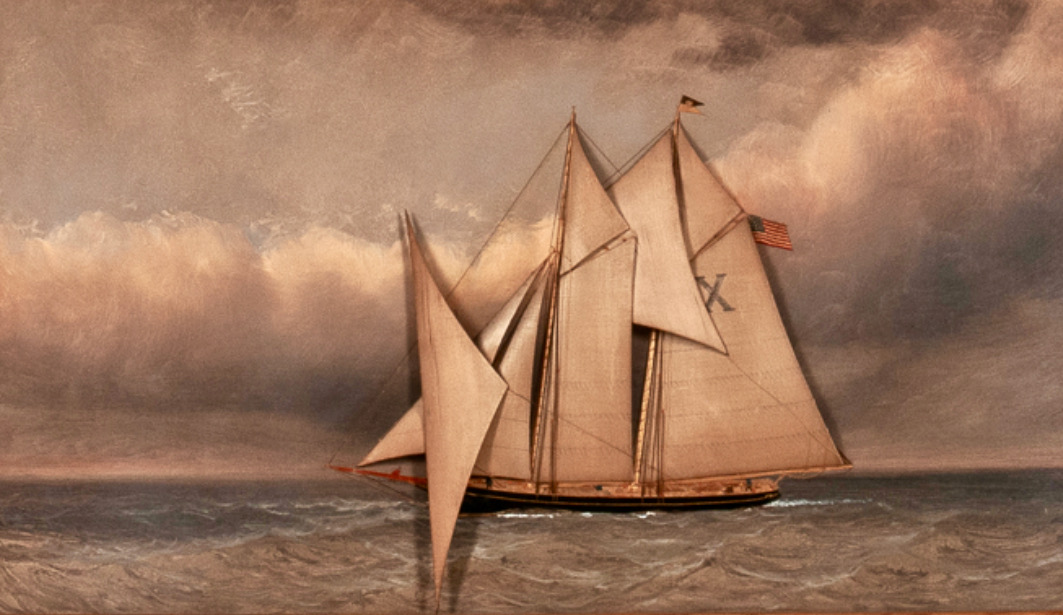
- Pilot Boat Jesse Carll, No. 10., by Thomas H. Willis.

History

United States
- Name: Jesse Carll
- Namesake: Jesse Carll, shipbuilder
- Owner: Jesse Carll, Pilots George H. Sisco and D. H. Nicholl
- Operator: William H. Anderson, Gideon L. Mapes
- Builder: Jesse Carll shipyard
- Cost: $16,000
- Launched: 17 August 1885
- Out of service: 1 February 1896
- Fate: Sold

General characteristics
- Class & type: schooner
- Tonnage: 61-tons TM
- Length: 81 ft 0 in (24.69 m)
- Beam: 23 ft 0 in (7.01 m)
- Draft: 5 ft 0 in (1.52 m)
- Depth: 10 ft 0 in (3.05 m)
- Propulsion: Sail

The Jesse Carll was a 19th-century pilot boat, built in 1885 by Jesse Carll at Northport, New York, for George H. Sisco. She was one of the largest vessels ever built in the Sandy Hook service. She was named in honor of Jesse Carll, a well-known Northport shipbuilder. In 1896, in the age of steam, the Ezra Nye, along with other pilot boats, were replaced with steamboats.

== Construction and service ==
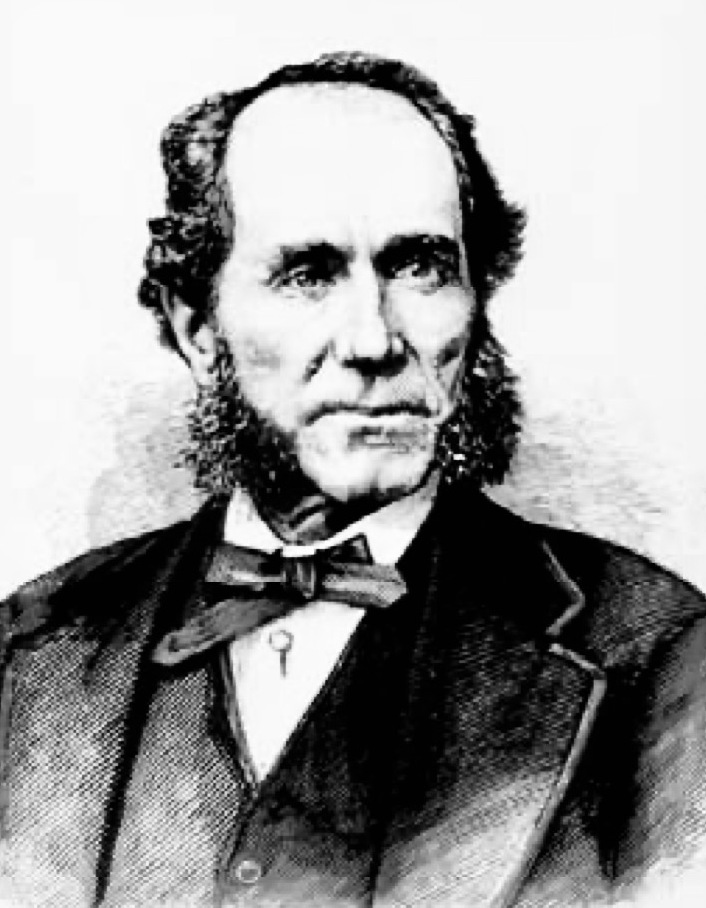
Jesse Carll (1832–1902), shipbuilder.

The New York schooner yacht Jesse Carll was built at Northport, New York in 1885. She was launched on 17 August 1885 as a pilot boat, No. 10. She was named in honor of the shipbuilder, Jesse Carll. On her mainsail was the large letter "X", that identified the boat as the Jesse Carll, No. 10.

The Jesse Carll was registered as a New York Pilot Schooner with the Record of American and Foreign Shipping, from 1886 to 1900. Her dimensions were 81 ft. in length; 23 ft. breadth of beam; 10 ft. depth (deep); 5 ft. draught; and 61-tons, making her the largest vessel in the Sandy Hook service. William H. Anderson was the ship master. She was owned by the Jesse Carll, Pilots George H. Sisco and D. H. Nicholl.

In the March Great Blizzard of 1888, pilot boat Jesse Carll, No, 10 was out on pilot duty after the storm. Her captain, Pilot W. H. Anderson spotted a wooden hatch of a pilot boat that sank during the blizzard.

In the summer of 1888, author and New York newspaper editor Charles Edward Russell talked about being on the pilot boat Edward F. Williams and racing with the pilot boat Jesse Carll, No. 10. When they saw a steam liner that needed a pilot, they raced to see which pilot boat could reach her first. The pilots from both boats took yawls and rowed them to the steamer to reach the steamer's ladder. As both yawls came to the ladder, pilot Moller from the Williams went up the side of the steamer first to salute the captain.

In 1889, Gideon L. Mapes was in charge of the pilot boat Jesse Carll, No. 10 when it was off Fire Island and got stuck on a sandbar at Zach's Inlet during a thunderstorm. Mapes and the ten men on board were taken ashore in life-saving boats. The Jesse Carll was later raised and repaired.

== End of service ==
On 1 February 1896, the New York Pilots discarded sixteen sailboats and moved them to the Erie Basin in Brooklyn. They were replaced with steam pilot boats. The Jesse Carll was sold for $5,500.

== See also ==
- List of Northeastern U. S. Pilot Boats
