= David Carll =

American shipbuilder

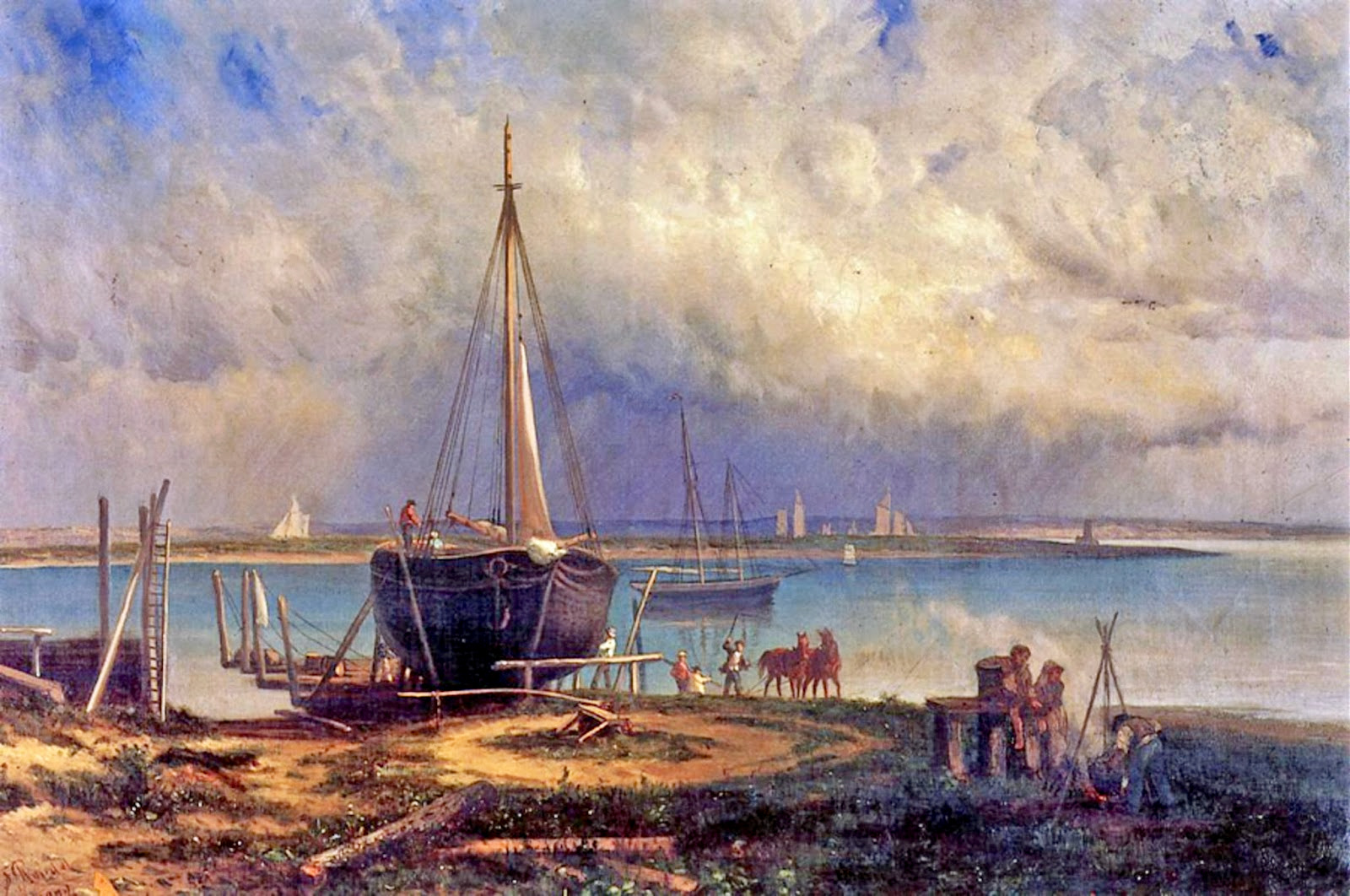
- Painting near David Carll's Shipyard.
- Born: October 9, 1830; Northport, New York, US
- Died: December 27, 1888 (aged 58); Crescent City, Florida, US
- Occupation: shipbuilder
- Spouse: Hannah Amelia Denton
- Children: 4

David Carll (abt. 1832–December 27, 1888) was a 19th-century American shipbuilder. He built yachts and schooners. He specialized in shallow draft Centreboard schooners. The David Carll's shipyard was the first commercial shipyard built on City Island. He built the popular schooners David Carll, Vesta, Resolute, and Ambassadress. His brother, Jesse Carll had a successful shipyard in Northport, New York.

== Early life ==
David Carll was born in New York, abt. 1832. He married Hannah Amelia Denton in 1861 at Christ's First Presbyterian Church, Nassau County, New York. They had three daughters Susie D. Rich, Minnie Estelle Harrington, Jesse Anita Carll and one son David Carll Jr.

== Career ==
Carll was well known for building fast and seaworthy yachts and schooners. He specialized in shallow draft Centreboard schooners. David Carll's shipyard was the first commercial shipyard built on City Island. He built the popular schooners Vesta, Resolute, and Ambassadress.

David and Jesse built the bark Storm Bird, which put them into debt. They dissolved the partnership in 1865. His brother, Jesse Carll continued with a shipyard under the name Jesse Carll and built yachts, pilot-boats and brigs, including the bark Mary Greenwood, the Joseph Rudd, and the pilot-boat Jesse Carll. David Carll continued with his shipyard until he retired in 1885. In the 1870s, David purchased an orange plantation near Crescent City, Florida, and planted more than sixty thousand trees.

In 1859, Carll moved from Northport and bought out and enlarged the shipyard started by Samuel P. Hart in City Island, Bronx, at the East End of Pilot Avenue. In 1859, he built a 37-foot sloop Bell for James Sackett at City Island. He built many boats, such as the schooner Wm H. Van Name (1872), the pilot boat David Carll (1876) and the yachts Vesta, (1865) and Resolute, (1871). The Resolute, was renamed the Ramona. In 1863, David Carll more acres of land a wharf in 1865. The Vesta was modeled and built by David Carll for the tobacco heir Pierre Lorillard in 1866. She was in the great ocean race in 1866, against the Henrietta and Fleetwing.

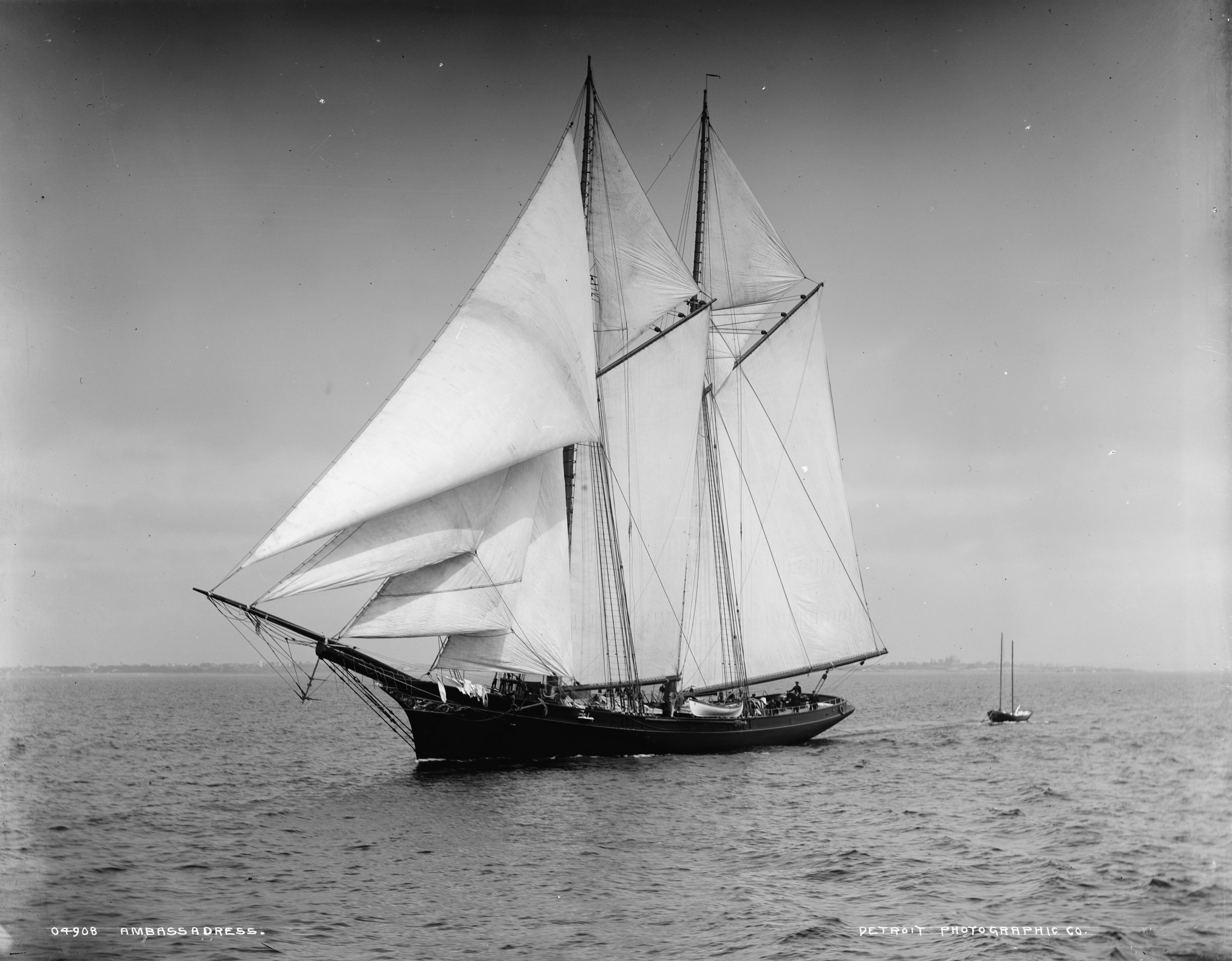
Schooner Ambassadress.

He also did the alterations for the schooner yacht Sappho (1867). He built the yachts: Ambassadress (1877), Nirvana (1884), Atalanta (1873), Vega Reindeer (1873), Stephen D. Barnes (1875), LV 39 (1875), William H. Bailey (1878), Samuel S. Thorp (1881), Mollie J. Saunders (1883), Sue Williams (1883), and Vesta; the sloops: Gracie (1878), Phebe and Lurline; and the Magic for Franklin Osgood.

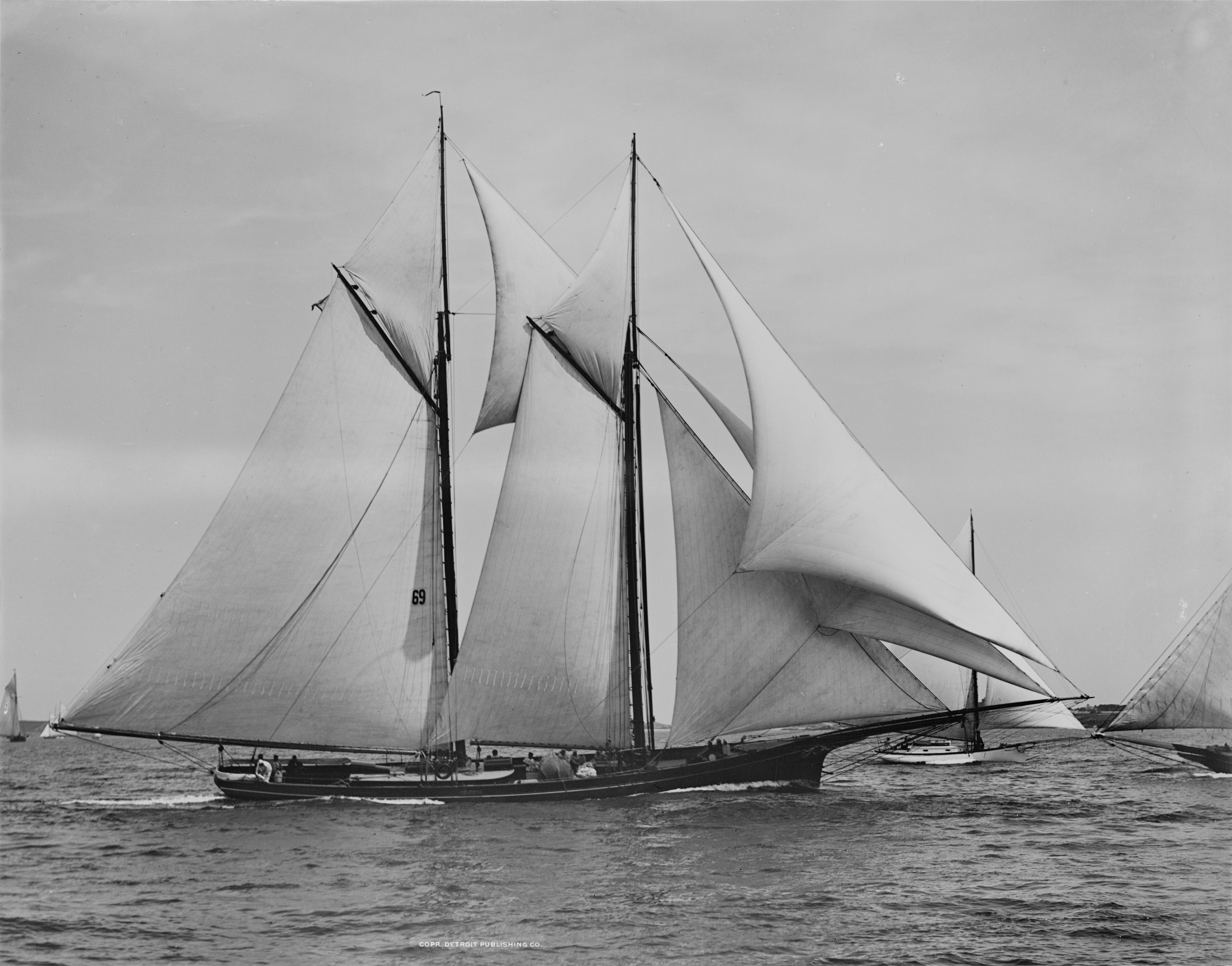
Schooner Magic.

In 1864, David Carll served as an Elders of the Second Presbyterian Church of Huntington. He was a member and Vestryman of the Grace Episcopal Church in City Island for over twenty five years. His brother, Jesse, died on October 24, 1902, in Northport, New York, at 72 years old.

On May 21, 1872, Vice-Commodore John S. Dickerson of the Brooklyn Yacht Club took the schooner-yacht Fleur de Lis to be fitted out by David Carll. She also got an entire suit of canvass by J. M. Sawyer. Alterations were completed on June 10, 1872.

== Death ==
David Carll died on December 27, 1888, at the age of 62 at his plantation, near Crescent City, Florida. His widow, Hannah, sold the shipyard to Henry Piepgrass, who continued the shipyard until 1900, when he sold it to the Robert Jacob Shipyard (1900-1946); then to the Consolidated Shipbuilding (1946-1958) and Consolidated Yachts (1958–present).

== See also ==
- List of Northeastern U. S. Pilot Boats
