= How the Jews Care For Their Poor =

Lost 1913 American silent film

Still from the lost silent film, How the Jews Care For Their Poor.

How the Jews Care For Their Poor is a lost 1913 American silent film directed and written by Max Abelman and Benjamin H. Namm and produced by Universal Film Manufacturing Company. The film was conceived and created by the Brooklyn Federation of Jewish Charities, an agency for Jewish philanthropic fundraising with headquarters in Brooklyn, New York. The film represented an early and successful effort to make use the new medium of film as an adjunct for charitable fundraising.

== Background ==
The film was conceived and co-written by Max Abelman, a young executive with the Brooklyn Federation of Jewish Charities.

The ethnic Jewish population of New York City and its environs exploded during the first two decades of the 20th century, with the number of Jews in Brooklyn growing from about 300,000 to about 400,000 in 1913 alone. Many of these new immigrants to America were impoverished refugees from Eastern Europe and they lived clustered in urban ghettos marked by hunger and illness. Beginning in 1910 an organization called the Brooklyn Federation of Jewish Charities was established to engage in fundraising on behalf of social welfare agencies attempting to ameliorate the living conditions of these newly-arrived Jewish poor.

The Brooklyn Federation of Jewish Charities was active in philanthropy and social aid between the years 1910 and 1927. The need for funds was paramount, as the costs of providing for a suffering population far outstripped the ability of social service organizations to provide relief. In the words of Assistant Secretary of the Brooklyn Federation of Jewish Charities Max Abelman, the adage attributed to Napoleon Bonaparte that "for war are needed three things — money, money, and money" applied equally to his own organization, for "we are literally engaged in a warfare against want and privation, and to accomplish our ends we must have money."

Only $30,000 had been mustered by the Brooklyn Federation of Jewish Charities in 1913, Abelman noted, with a need for more than $100,000 per year evident for the charity to be able to conduct its activities sufficiently, with the Brooklyn Jewish Hospital severely overcrowded and the Brooklyn Hebrew Orphan Asylum similarly stretched past capacity and in dire need of funds. The idea was conceived to mobilize support for their cause with a motion picture which would illuminate what Abelman called "a typical case which comes to our attention and the method in which we handle it." This work of visual propaganda was to be the film How the Jews Care For Their Poor.

== Production ==
To implement Abelman's plan, the Brooklyn Federation of Jewish Charities formed a special committee in 1913 dedicated to the project of fundraising through the use of motion pictures. Abelman was joined in the writing of the screenplay by Benjamin H. Namm, chair of the Federation's Mens Committee. The film, originally planned as a single reel in length, was directed by Sidney Golden for the Universal Film Manufacturing Company as the agent of the Brooklyn Federation. The film came in at two reels in length, however.

== Plot ==
After the death of her husband, a young Russian Jewish woman comes to America with her little boy and girl. Upon landing at Ellis Island the three are met by a charitable worker from the Brooklyn Council of Jewish Women, who looks after their welfare. They are taken to live with the woman's brother, a poor tinsmith, only to have the mother's health fail. Her brother promises the dying woman that he will care for her children, but misfortune befalls him, but he himself becomes ill and his friends notify the Brooklyn Federation of Jewish Charities.

With the brother hospitalized, the children are taken to the Brooklyn Hebrew Orphan Asylum, where they are well cared-for until the brother is released from the hospital.

Several years later, the board of directors of the Brooklyn Federation of Jewish Charities assemble at the orphan asylum to commencement exercises at the orphan asylum, where the boy whose uncle had left there years earlier delivers the valedictory address. His address, “Charity, or How the Jews Care for Their Poor,” prompts a philanthropist to make a substantial donation to the Federation, hoping to encourage others to support it's charitable work.

== Screenings ==
How the Jews Care For Their Poor debuted on December 21, 1913, at the third annual banquet of the Brooklyn Federation of Jewish Charities, held at Kismet Temple in Brooklyn, New York. The film quickly proved an effective tool for the Federation's fundraising activity and it was screened at at least 11 different events between January 1914 and January 1915. Several of these events took place at the Orthodox Congregation of Far Rockaway, Queens and enjoyed "a very large attendance."

The movie was also shown outside of the New York metropolitan area, with the St. Louis Federation of Jewish Charities anxious to make use of the two-reel film at its 1914 annual banquet.

== See also ==
- Jewish-American working class
