= Henry J. Scudder =

American politician

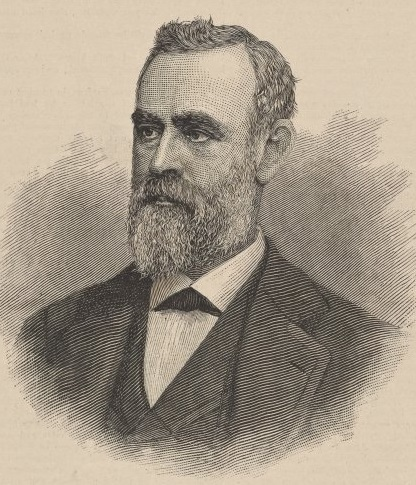

Member of the U.S. House of Representatives from New York's 1st district
- In office March 4, 1873 – March 3, 1875
- Preceded by: Dwight Townsend
- Succeeded by: Henry B. Metcalfe

Personal details
- Born: September 18, 1825 Northport, New York, U.S.
- Died: February 10, 1886 (aged 60) New York City, New York, U.S.
- Party: Republican
- Spouses: Louisa Henrietta Davies (m. 1853; died 1864) Emma Willard (m. 1866)
- Relations: Townsend Scudder (nephew)
- Parent(s): Henry Scudder; Elizabeth Hewlett
- Education: Trinity College
- Known for: Founder of Scudder & Carter

Henry Joel Scudder (September 18, 1825 – February 10, 1886) was a United States representative from New York.

== Early life ==
Born in Northport. He was the son of Henry Scudder (1778–1863) and Elizabeth (née Hewlett) Scudder (1792–1870). His paternal grandparents were Henry Scudder (1743–1822), of Crab Meadow in Long Island, and Phebe Carll Scudder (1743–1821). His nephew, Townsend Scudder (July–1960), was a judge and also a U.S. Representative from New York. His maternal grandfather was Divine Hewlett.

Scudder was descended from Thomas Scudder, who immigrated to Salem, Massachusetts, from Kent in 1630, and was related to fellow U.S. Congressmen Tredwell Scudder.

He attended the district school and Huntington Academy. He graduated from Trinity College in Hartford, Connecticut, in 1846.

== Career ==
Following his graduation from Trinity, he studied law, was admitted to the bar in 1848 and practiced in New York City. In 1854, he founded the law firm of Scudder & Carter, which is now known as Carter Ledyard & Milburn. He was commissioned captain in the Thirty-seventh Regiment of the New York National Guard in 1862 and served throughout the Civil War.

Scudder was elected as a Republican to the Forty-third Congress, holding office from March 4, 1873, to March 3, 1875. While in Congress, he was assigned to the Committee on War Claims. He declined to be a candidate for renomination in 1874 and was a trustee of Trinity College for over twenty years. He resumed the practice of law in New York City, where he was principal counsel for the Standard Oil Company.

In 1876, he was a candidate for Judge of the Superior Court of New York. In 1884, the Republicans of Suffolk County again tried to persuade Scudder to accept the nomination for Judge.

== Personal life ==
On June 21, 1853, Scudder was married to Louisa Henrietta Davies (1834–1864), the daughter of Prof. Charles Davies of the United States Military Academy. Together, they were the parents of:

- Henry Townsend Scudder (1854–1937), a Reverend who was married to Margaret Mott Weeks (1863–1933), the daughter of Jacob Mott Weeks.
- Charles Davies Scudder (1856–1892), a physician in New York City who married Louisa Wardner Evarts (1861–1937), the daughter of former Senator William M. Evarts, in 1883.
- Edward Mansfield Scudder (1858–1944), a Trinity graduate who was also a lawyer and died unmarried.
- Mary English Scudder (1859–1882), who died unmarried at age 22.
- Elizabeth Scudder (1861–1865), who died young.

After his first wife's death, he remarried to Emma Willard (1835–1893) in 1866. Emma was the daughter of John Hart Willard (1810–1883) and a granddaughter of Emma Willard, who founded the Emma Willard School in Troy, New York. Together, they were the parents of six children, including:

- Willard Scudder (1868–1936), a teacher at St. Paul's School in Concord, New Hampshire.
- Louisa H. Scudder (c. 1868), who died young.
- Heyward Scudder (1870–1917), a MIT graduate in Medicine who died unmarried.
- Emma Willard Scudder (1871–1944), who attended the N.Y. School of Applied Design for Women and married Dr. Edward Loughborough Keyes (1873–1948), the son of Dr. Edward Lawrence Keyes and grandson of Gen. Erasmus D. Keyes, in 1898.
- Hewlett Scudder (1875–1942), a Yale graduate who studied technical engineering at Columbia University.

Scudder died at his residence on East 22nd Street on February 10, 1886, in New York City. He was buried in the family cemetery at Northport. His funeral, held at Calvary Church in New York, was attended by Joseph Hodges Choate, Sen. William M. Evarts, Mayor Grace, ex-Chief Justice Charles P. Daly, William Allen Butler, James C. Carter, Aaron J. Vanderpoel, Elihu Root, Elbridge Thomas Gerry, Col. George Bliss, Benjamin H. Bristow, and Clarence A. Seward.

U.S. House of Representatives
Preceded by Dwight Townsend	Member of the U.S. House of Representatives from New York's 1st congressional district 1873–1875	Succeeded by Henry B. Metcalfe
