= Brinley D. Sleight =

American politician (1835–1913)

Brinley Dering Sleight (March 11, 1835 – December 10, 1913) was an American politician and newspaper editor and publisher from Sag Harbor, New York.

== Life ==
Sleight was born on March 11, 1835 in Sag Harbor, New York, the son of William Rysam Sleight and Anna Charlotte Dering. His father was an owner and outfitter of whale ships and a partner in the firm Mulford & Sleight.

Sleight spent several years at the Washington Institute in Murray Hill, Manhattan, a notable school that was run by Timothy Dwight and Theodore Woolsey Porter. He also studied under Rev. C. S. Williams. He entered Yale College in November 1853, but left in March 1854. He returned to Yale in September 1855 and graduated from there in 1858. In 1859, he bought the Sag Harbor weekly The Corrector and served as its editor and publisher together with A. A. Hunt via the firm Sleight & Hunt. In 1865, he also bought the Schoarie Republican and edited and published the paper together with Hunt.

Sleight ended his connection with the Schoharie Republican in 1869. In 1860, he started a campaign daily in Sag Harbor, the first daily paper to be published in Sag Harbor. It opposed the Republican Party and endorsed John Bell and Edward Everett in the 1860 United States presidential election. In that year, he unsuccessfully ran for the New York State Assembly in the Suffolk County 1st District, losing to James H. Tuthill. He ran as a Democrat with the endorsement of the American Party. He ran again for the New York State Assembly as a Democrat in 1869 and won, representing Suffolk County. He served in the Assembly in 1870. He unsuccessfully ran for the Assembly again in 1880, losing to Republican George M. Fletcher.

Sleight was a charter member of the Board of Education when it was founded in 1869 and served on it for 35 years, acting as its president and secretary at different points. He served as trustee and president of the village. He was a magistrate of East Hampton for 12 years and unsuccessfully ran for Supervisor. He served as a clerk in the United States House Committee on Foreign Affairs from 1886 to 1888, when Representative Perry Belmont was its chairman. He was a clerk in the United States House Committee on Patents from 1894 to 1896, when Representative James W. Covert was its chairman. He also served as a notary public for Suffolk County.

When Sleight was in Yale, he was a Wooden Spoon man and a member of Linonia, Delta Kappa Epsilon, and Scroll and Key. He joined the Gazelle Hose Company in 1853, and by the time he died he was the oldest exempt fireman of the Sag Harbor Fire Department. He became a Freemason in 1870, and in 1875 he became Master of his lodge. In 1865, he married Susan Jane Hedges. Their children were Cornelius Rysam, William Johnson Rysam, and Henry Dering.

Sleight was in poor health for some time before his death and he sought relief at Southampton Hospital, but when the relief didn't come he returned home to spend his last days with his family. He died at home from Bright's disease on December 10, 1913. A private funeral was held at his home, with Rev. William T. Edds of the Sag Harbor Presbyterian Church officiating. He was buried in the family vault in Sag Harbor, with the services conducted by the Freemason lodge he was previously Master of.

New York State Assembly
Preceded by William A. Conant	New York State Assembly; Suffolk County; 1870	Succeeded by George F. Carman
