= Franklin A. Coles =

American lawyer and politician

Franklin Albert Coles (August 24, 1861 – August 10, 1943) was an American lawyer and politician from New York.

== Life ==
Coles was born on August 24, 1861 in Glen Cove, New York, the son of Isaac Coles and Mary Willits. His father was a merchant and civil engineer who served in the New York State Legislature in 1862. He was a descendant of settler Robert Coles.

Coles initially attended the Glen Cove Public School, followed by the Friends Academy in Locust Valley. He then went to Cornell University, where he was a member of Theta Delta Chi, editor for the Cornellian in 1883, and was involved with the Cornell Sun. He graduated from Cornell with a B.S. in 1884. He worked as a teacher in the Friends Academy from 1884 to 1886, and then at the Friends' Central School in Philadelphia from 1886 to 1887. He then attended the University of Pennsylvania, graduating from there with an LL.B. in 1888. He was admitted to the Pennsylvania state bar shortly afterwards. He was admitted to the New York state bar in 1890, at which point he began practicing law in New York City, with an office at 150 Nassau Street. He still resided in his native Glen Cove.

Coles served as district attorney of Nassau County from 1905 to 1911. He was a delegate to the 1915 New York State Constitutional Convention. In 1917, he was elected to the New York State Assembly as a Republican, representing the Nassau County 2nd District. He served in the Assembly in 1918 and 1919. He was chairman of the original Glen Cove Charter Commission, and while in the Assembly he introduced a bill that made Glen Cove, then an unincorporated part of Oyster Bay, the right to be its own city. By 1925, he moved his law practice to Brooklyn, with an office at 215 Montague Street.

Coles was first elected to the Board of Education in 1895, later becoming president of the board. He became a trustee of the Glen Cove Public Library in 1894, later becoming executive head of the trustee board. He was an organizer and president of the Nassau County Bar Association. He was a member of the Society of Friends. In 1906, he married Carolyn Reed. They had a son, Robert Reed.

Coles died in North Country Community Hospital in Glen Cove after a year-long illness on August 10, 1943. He was buried in Matinecock Friends Meeting House Cemetery in Locust Valley.

New York State Assembly
Preceded by District Created	New York State Assembly; Nassau County, 2nd District; 1918–1919	Succeeded by Theodore Roosevelt Jr.
