= L. Bradford Prince =

American judge and politician (1840–1922)

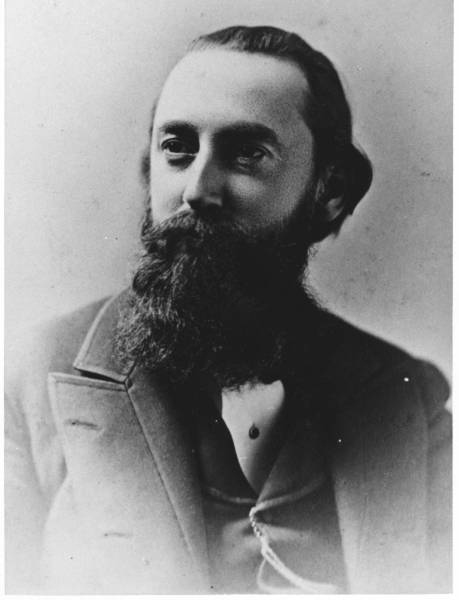

13th Governor of New Mexico Territory
- In office April 17, 1889 – April 20, 1893
- Appointed by: Benjamin Harrison
- Preceded by: Edmund G. Ross
- Succeeded by: William Taylor Thornton

Chief Justice of the New Mexico Supreme Court
- In office 1878–1882

Member of the New York Senate from the 1st district
- In office 1876–1877
- Preceded by: John A. King
- Succeeded by: James M. Oakley

Member of the New York State Assembly from the Queens County's 1st district
- In office 1871–1875
- Preceded by: James B. Pearsall
- Succeeded by: Townsend D. Cock

Personal details
- Born: July 3, 1840 Flushing, New York, U.S.
- Died: December 8, 1922 (aged 82) Flushing, New York, U.S.
- Resting place: Flushing Cemetery
- Party: Republican
- Education: Columbia University
- Occupation: Lawyer, politician, judge

LeBaron Bradford Prince (July 3, 1840 – December 8, 1922) was an American lawyer and politician who served as chief justice of the New Mexico Territorial Supreme Court from 1878 to 1882, and as the 13th governor of New Mexico Territory from 1889 to 1893.

== Early life and career ==
Prince was born on July 3, 1840, in Flushing, Queens, New York. His parents were horticulturist William Robert Prince and his wife, Charlotte Goodwin (Collins) Prince. Young Prince started his career working in nurseries run by his father and brother. The nurseries were sold at the end of the Civil War, and he studied law at Columbia University, where he received an LL.B. in 1866.

== Political career ==
He was a delegate to the 1868 Republican National Convention from New York. He was a member of the New York State Assembly (Queens County, 1st District) in 1871, 1872, 1873, 1874, and 1875. He was a member of the New York State Senate (1st District) in 1876 and 1877.

At the 1876 Republican National Convention, he was among those who supported Rutherford B. Hayes over Roscoe Conkling. That resulted in him being given the opportunity to be governor of the Territory of Idaho. He passed but later became a chief justice of the New Mexico Territorial Supreme Court from 1878 to 1882. In 1883, he became president of the New Mexico Historical Society.

President Benjamin Harrison appointed Prince to be Governor of New Mexico Territory from 1889 to 1893. Prince and his wife, Mary, resided in the Palace of the Governors and held social functions there.

Prince led the movement to create the Spanish American Normal School and served as President of its governing board from 1909 to 1912.

He was a member of New Mexico Territorial Council in 1909 and a delegate to the New Mexico State Constitutional Convention of 1911.

He was a member of the New Mexico Horticultural Society, the Society for the Preservation of Spanish Antiquities, the New Mexico Archaeological Society, the Society of the Cincinnati, Sons of the Revolution, the Society of Colonial Wars and the Protestant Episcopal Church.

== Marriage and death ==
In 1879, he married Hattie E. Childs, who died in 1880. In 1881, he married Mary C. Beardsley. They had one child.

Prince died at Flushing Hospital in Queens on December 8, 1922.

== Works ==
- E Pluribus Unum: The Articles of Confederation vs. the Constitution (1867)
- The General Laws of New Mexico (1880)
- A Nation or a League (1880)
- Historical Sketches of New Mexico (1883)
- The American Church and Its Name (1887)
- The Money Problem (1896)
- The Stone Lions of Cochiti (1903)
- Old Fort Marcy (1911)
- A Concise History of New Mexico (1912)
- The Student's History of New Mexico (1913)
- Spanish Mission Churches of New Mexico (1915)
- Abraham Lincoln, the Man (1917)

New York State Assembly
Preceded by James B. Pearsall	New York State Assembly; Queens County, 1st District; 1871–1875	Succeeded by Townsend D. Cock
New York State Senate
Preceded by John A. King	New York State Senate; 1st District; 1876–1877	Succeeded by James M. Oakley
Government offices
Preceded by Edmund G. Ross	Governor of New Mexico Territory; 1889–1893	Succeeded by William Taylor Thornton
