= Charles S. Havens =

American businessman and politician

Charles Smith Havens (August 26, 1834 – April 23, 1906) was an American businessman and politician from Center Moriches, New York.

== Life ==
Havens was born on August 26, 1834 in East Patchogue, New York, the son of John Havens and Eliza Ketchum. His brother was Assemblyman John S. Havens.

Havens moved with his family to Patchogue in 1835. He attended Bellport Academy and spent a year of special study with Rev. James H. Thomas. In 1848, he began clerking in his brother John's store Howell & Havens. In 1856, Walter Howell sold his stake and Havens began a partnership with his brother called J. S. and C. S. Havens. The partnership ended in 1862, when the store burned down in a fire, Havens sold the partnership, and he spent a few years farming. In 1864, he moved to Center Moriches, bought a stock of merchandise, and began renting Captain William Penny's store. Five years later, he bought the store. In 1865, he and John bought a paper mill in Canaan, north of Patchogue, that began running in 1875 and turned out 75 to 100 tons of strawboard a year.

Havens was Supervisor of Brookhaven Town from 1866 to 1868 and from 1874 to 1877, serving as Chairman of the Board from 1876 to 1877. In 1877, he was elected to the New York State Assembly as a Democrat, representing Suffolk County. He won the election over Republican candidate Everett A. Carpenter by 38 votes. He served in the Assembly in 1878. In 1893, he was appointed postmaster of Center Moriches. He served as postmaster until 1897. In 1886, he formed a partnership with his son John Lewis Havens under the name C. S. Havens & Son. In 1899, John (by then a New York State Senator) retired from the family firm and the partnership dissolved. Havens continued running the store until the day he died.

A Presbyterian, Havens was a clerk of the board and a ruling elder of the local Presbyterian church as well as president and superintendent of its Sunday school. In 1858, he married Nancy M. Williamson of Franklinville. Their children were John Lewis (husband of Imogene Reeve and Sarita I. Gardner), Lillian (wife of Grosvenor C. Adams), and Henrietta "Hattie".

Havens died at his store from heart disease on April 23, 1906. His funeral was held in the Presbyterian Church he was a member of, with Rev. Dr. Gegges of that church conducting the service while the elders of the church and the East Moriches Church serving as honorary pallbearers. The local Freemason lodge sent a large delegation to the funeral and conducted Masonic ceremonies. His employees carried the casket. He was buried in Mount Pleasant Cemetery.

New York State Assembly
Preceded by Francis Brill	New York State Assembly; Suffolk County; 1878	Succeeded by Charles T. Duryea
