= Kopytko Triangle =

Green space in Queens, New York

Coordinates: 40.750183°N 73.809042°W

Scott M. Kopytko Triangle is a 0.0023-acre (100 sq ft) public green space in the Flushing neighborhood of Queens, New York City. It is bound by 158th Street, Oak Avenue, and Quince Avenue.

== Description ==
The triangle's shape is the result of two street grids intersecting with each other to form this small green space. To the park's west, streets named after plants, such as Poplar, Quince, and Rose, recall Flushing's past as America's premier horticultural center at the site of what is now Kissena Park. William Prince established the New World's first commercial nursery in Flushing in 1735.

This triangle honors Scott Michael Kopytko (1968–2001) who once lived near this triangle. He was among the 343 members of the New York City Fire Department (FDNY) killed in the terrorist attack on the World Trade Center on September 11, 2001. In 2002, the City Council passed legislation to name the triangle for Kopytko.

A lifelong resident of Queens, Kopytko attended local schools, including St. Ann's School, P.S. 163, Francis Lewis High School, and St. John's University. He worked as a Commodities Broker in the World Trade Center, but changed his career in 1998, realizing his dream of becoming a New York City Firefighter. His assigned firehouse, Ladder Company 15 and Engine Company 4, is located on South Street in Manhattan's Financial District, the neighborhood where he worked in his previous career. He was one of 12 men from his firehouse killed in the South Tower.
