= Senator Birdsall =

Senator Birdsall may refer to:

- John Birdsall (politician, born 1802) (1802–1839), New York State Senate
- John Birdsall (politician, born 1840) (1840–1891), New York State Senate

== See also ==
- Regina Birdsell (born c. 1956), New Hampshire Senate
