= Edwin Bailey =

Edwin Bailey may refer to:

- Edwin Bailey (American football), American football player
- Edwin Bailey (politician), English-American businessman and politician
- Edwin C. Bailey, American newspaper editor and postmaster
