= Llewellyn P. Young =

American lawyer

Llewellyn P. Young (1923–1984) was an American lawyer who served as regional administrator for the Securities and Exchange Commission.

== Early life and education ==
Born in 1923 in Newton, Massachusetts, Young received his early education from Albany Academy. He attended Haverford College, where he graduated with a bachelor of arts degree in 1947. Later, he earned a law degree from Yale Law School in 1950. He served as a naval officer in the Pacific during World War II.

== Career ==
Young began his career in 1961 when he became the head of its New York office, Young worked at the New York law firm Carter Ledyard & Milburn. In 1966, he joined the Wall Street brokerage firm Francis I. duPont & Co. as a partner, and subsequently held positions as vice president, secretary, and counsel at Bradford National Corporation, a computer and data-processing firm.
