= Charles T. Duryea =

American politician (1832–1899)

Member of the New York State Assembly from the Suffolk County district
- In office January 1879 – January 1879
- Preceded by: Charles S. Havens
- Succeeded by: George F. Carman

Member of the New York State Assembly from the Queens County's 1st district
- In office 1863–1864
- Preceded by: Isaac Coles
- Succeeded by: William Turner

Under Sheriff of Suffolk County
- In office 1883–1886

Superintendent of New York Bonded Warehouses
- In office 1887–1887

Deputy Collector of the Port of New York

Personal details
- Born: August 20, 1832 Center Moriches, New York, U.S.
- Died: December 27, 1899 (aged 67) Babylon, New York, U.S.
- Resting place: Babylon Rural Cemetery, Babylon, New York
- Party: Democratic
- Spouse: Mary Mowbray Smith (m. 1858)
- Children: 4
- Occupation: Farmer, hotel keeper, politician

Charles Terhune Duryea (August 20, 1832 – December 27, 1899) was an American politician from New York.

== Life ==
Duryea was born on August 20, 1832, in Center Moriches, New York, the son of John Hubbs Duryea and Maria Duryea.

Duryea attended Miller's Place Academy, a well-known school at the time. When he was 19, he moved with his parents to Dix Hills, where his father built a farm. He left the farm shortly afterwards and became a teacher in the House of Refuge in Manhattan. Shortly after his wedding, he moved to Syosset and began farming there.

Duryea was Justice of the Peace from 1860 to 1862. In 1862, he was elected to the New York State Assembly as a Democrat, representing the Queens County 1st District. He served in the Assembly in 1863 and 1864. In 1865, he moved to Brooklyn and spent the next two years representing a railroad pool in the Bureau of Immigration. In 1867, he moved to Huntington, leased the Suffolk Hotel, and spent the next several years successfully conducting the hotel. In 1874, he moved to Babylon and began managing Sumpwams Hotel, the leading local hotel at the time.

Duryea was a Trustee of Huntington in 1871 and Supervisor of Babylon in 1876 and 1878. In 1878, he was the Democratic candidate for the New York State Assembly in Suffolk County and was declared the winner by one vote. He briefly served in 1879 but the Assembly declared the Republican candidate George F. Carman the winner. In 1879, he was the Democratic candidate for the New York State Senate in New York's 1st State Senate district. He lost the election to Republican candidate John Birdsall.

At one point, Duryea edited the Babylon paper Budget, which later merged with the South Side Signal. In 1883, Sheriff Selah S. Brewster appointed him Under Sheriff. He served in that office until the start of 1886. In 1887, Collector Daniel Magone appointed him Superintendent of New York Bonded Warehouses. And when Deputy Collector Dabney died a few years later, Collector James T. Kilbreth appointed him to that position. He retired in 1896 due to poor health.

In 1858, Duryea married Mary Mowbray Smith. Their children were Carel Smith, Emma Louise, Annie Maria, and Stephen Conklin.

Duryea died at home from a long illness on December 27, 1899. His funeral was conducted at his home and was led by the Rev. George Downings Sparks, the rector of Christ Church in West Islip. A delegation of officers and members from the Freemason lodge Duryea was a member of attended the funeral. He was buried in the Babylon Rural Cemetery.

New York State Assembly
Preceded by Isaac Coles	New York State Assembly; Queens County, 1st District; 1863–1864	Succeeded by William Turner
Preceded by Charles S. Havens	New York State Assembly; Suffolk County; January 1879	Succeeded by George F. Carman
