= Townsend Scudder =

American politician (1865–1960)

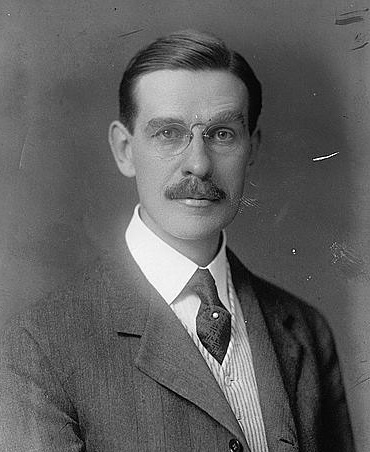

Member of the U.S. House of Representatives from New York's 1st district
- In office March 4, 1903 – March 3, 1905
- Preceded by: Frederic Storm
- Succeeded by: William W. Cocks
- In office March 4, 1899 – March 3, 1901
- Preceded by: Joseph M. Belford
- Succeeded by: Frederic Storm

Personal details
- Born: July 26, 1865 Northport, New York, US
- Died: February 22, 1960 (aged 94) Greenwich, Connecticut, US
- Party: Democratic

Townsend Scudder (July 26, 1865 – February 22, 1960) was an American jurist and politician. A Democrat, he served as a United States representative from New York from 1899 to 1901 and again from 1903 to 1905.

== Biography ==
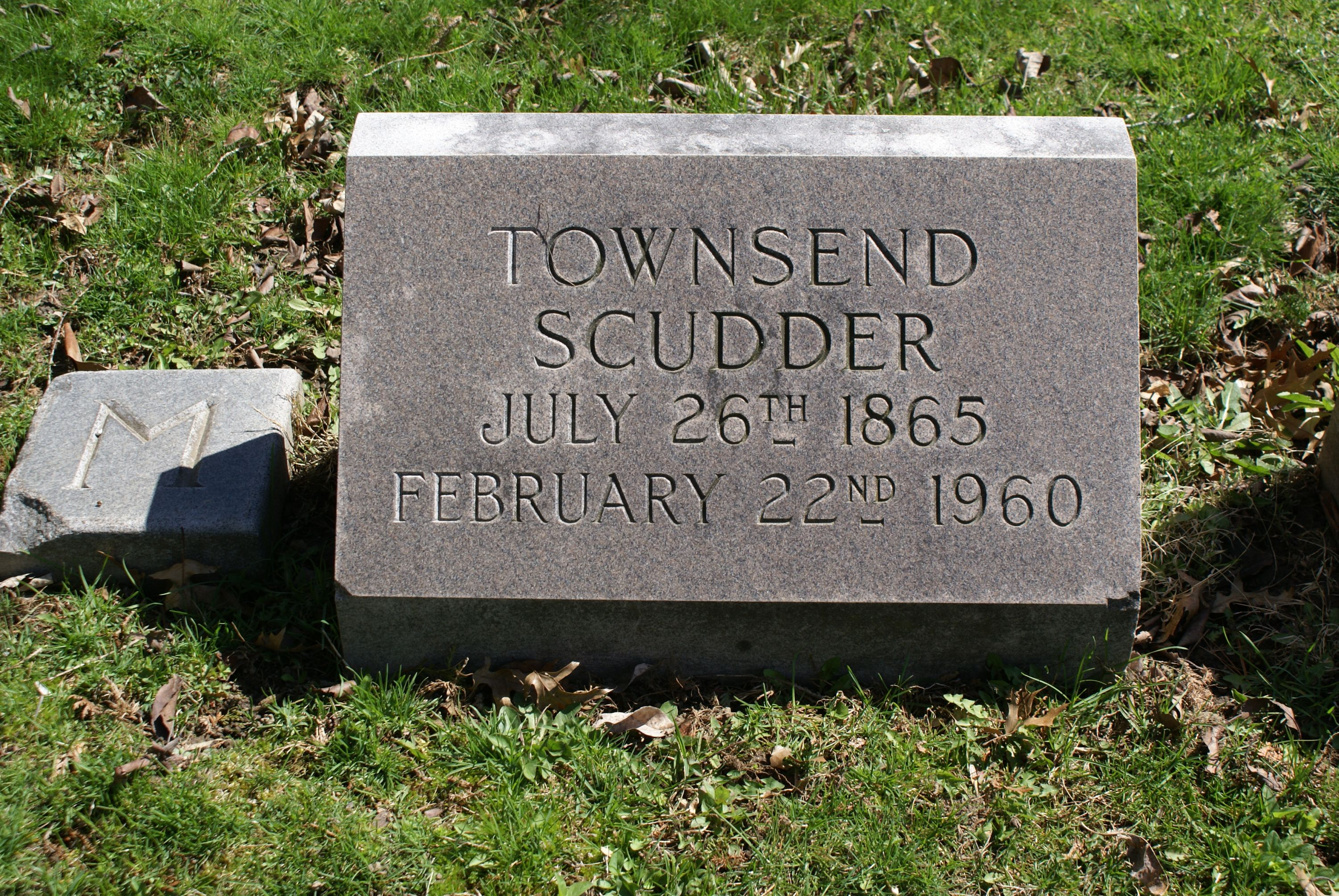
The grave of Townsend Scudder

Born in Northport, Scudder was a nephew of Henry Joel Scudder, also a U.S. Representative from New York. Townsend attended preparatory schools in Europe and graduated from Columbia Law School in 1888. He was admitted to the bar in 1889 and commenced practice in New York City.

Scudder served as the Grand Master of the Grand Lodge of New York of Freemasons from 1906 to 1907.

=== Congress ===
Scudder was corporation counsel for Queens County from 1893 to 1899, and was elected as a Democrat to the 56th United States Congress, holding office from March 4, 1899, to March 3, 1901. He declined to be a candidate for renomination in 1900 and resumed the practice of law. He was elected to the 58th United States Congress, holding office from March 4, 1903, to March 3, 1905.

=== Judicial career ===
Scudder was a justice of the New York Supreme Court (2nd District) from 1907 to 1920, and afterwards again resumed the practice of law in New York City. In 1921, he was defeated for the New York Court of Appeals by Republican William S. Andrews. He was State park commissioner and vice president of the Long Island State Park Commission from 1924 to 1927. He was appointed to the New York Supreme Court by Governor Alfred E. Smith in February 1927 and was subsequently nominated by the two major political parties to succeed himself for the full term of fourteen years.

In his first year on the bench, Scudder presided of the highly publicized murder trial of Ruth Snyder and her lover Henry Judd Gray, for the murder of Ruth's husband Albert Snyder. Both were convicted and sentenced to death, though Scudder personally opposed capital punishment and would trade criminal cases with other judges to avoid having to pass such sentences.

Scudder was active in the world of dogs. In 1932, he was the BIS (best in show) judge at the WKC (Westminster Kennel Club) dog show.

Scudder remained on the bench until the end of 1936, when he reached the constitutional retirement age of 70 years.

=== Death ===
Scudder died in Greenwich, Connecticut in 1960; interment was in Putnam Cemetery.

== Bibliography ==
- United States Congress. "Townsend Scudder (id: S000202)". Biographical Directory of the United States Congress.

U.S. House of Representatives
Preceded by Joseph M. Belford	Member of the U.S. House of Representatives from New York's 1st congressional district 1899–1901	Succeeded by Frederic Storm
Preceded by Frederic Storm	Member of the U.S. House of Representatives from New York's 1st congressional district 1903–1905	Succeeded by William W. Cocks
