= George M. Fletcher =

George Marion Fletcher (February 5, 1850 – October 22, 1915) was an American farmer, contractor, and politician from New York.

== Life ==
Fletcher was born on February 5, 1850, in Nashville, Tennessee. He attended public school there.

When Fletcher was a young man, he moved to West Neck, New York and lived on the Van Wyck farm, which was owned by his relative Samuel Van Wyck. He initially worked as a farmer in Huntington, although later he became an active member of Fletcher, Wesenberg & Co., a contracting firm for public works that had offices in Nashville. In 1881, he was elected to the New York State Assembly as a Republican, representing Suffolk County. He was elected over Democratic candidate Brinley D. Sleight. He served in the Assembly in 1882.

In 1894, Fletcher married Emma Tibbetts Smith. They lived in Centre Island following their marriage They had one son, George M. Jr.

Fletcher died at his home in Centre Island from heart failure on October 22, 1915. The funeral was conducted at his home, with Rev. G. E. Talmage of Christ Church in Oyster Bay conducting the service. He was buried in the Smith family burial ground on Centre Island.

New York State Assembly
Preceded by Everett A. Carpenter	New York State Assembly; Suffolk County; 1882	Succeeded by Edwin Bailey
