= Henry B. Metcalfe =

American politician (1805–1881)

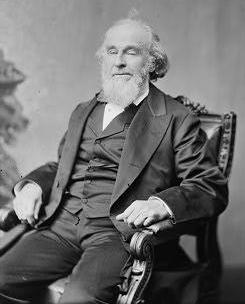

Member of the U.S. House of Representatives from New York's 1st district
- In office March 4, 1875 – March 3, 1877
- Preceded by: Henry Joel Scudder
- Succeeded by: James W. Covert

Personal details
- Born: Henry Bleecker Metcalfe; January 20, 1805 Albany, New York, U.S.
- Died: February 7, 1881 (aged 76) Staten Island, New York, U.S.
- Party: Democratic

Henry Bleecker Metcalfe (January 20, 1805 – February 7, 1881) was an American lawyer and politician who served one term as a U.S. representative from New York from 1875 to 1877.

== Biography ==
Born in Albany, New York, Metcalfe moved to New York City in 1811 and to Richmond County in 1816. He studied law. He was admitted to the bar and commenced practice in New York City in 1826. He served as prosecuting attorney of Richmond County from 1826 to 1832.

=== Judicial career ===
Metcalfe was elected county judge in 1840 and served until 1841 when he resigned. He resumed his position of county judge in 1847 and remained until 1875.

=== Congress ===
Metcalfe was elected as a Democrat to the Forty-fourth Congress (March 4, 1875 – March 3, 1877). He served as chairman of the Committee on Expenditures on Public Buildings (Forty-fourth Congress).

=== Death ===
He died in Richmond, Staten Island, New York on February 7, 1881. He was interred in the Moravian Cemetery, New Dorp, Staten Island, New York.

== Sources ==
- United States Congress. "Henry B. Metcalfe (id: M000673)". Biographical Directory of the United States Congress.

U.S. House of Representatives
Preceded by Henry Joel Scudder	Member of the U.S. House of Representatives from New York's 1st congressional district 1875–1877	Succeeded by James W. Covert
Legal offices
Preceded by George Metcalfe	Richmond County District Attorney; 1826–1833	Succeeded by Thomas S. Kingsland
