= James C. Carter =

American lawyer (1827–1905)

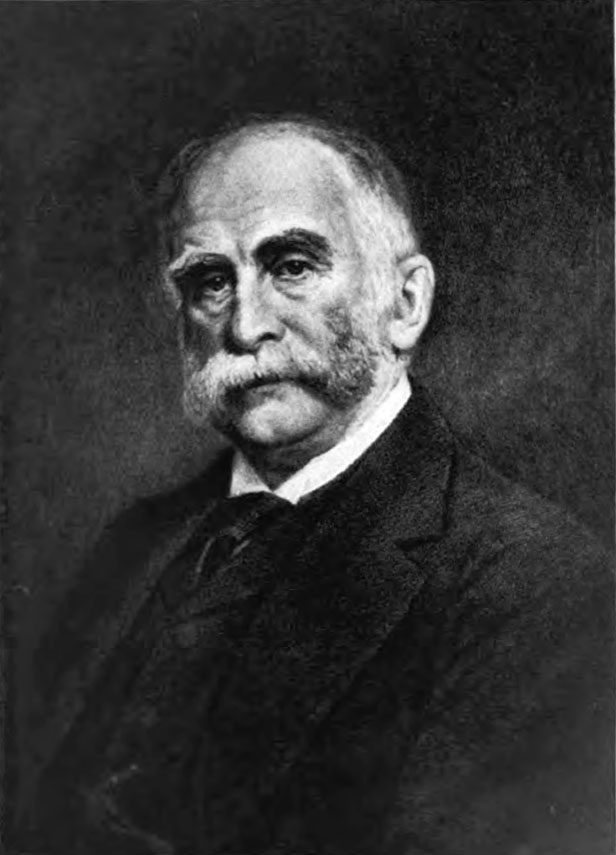
- After an etching on copper plate by James S. King, copyrighted and published by Charles Barmore of New York.
- Born: October 14, 1827; Lancaster, Massachusetts, U.S.
- Died: February 14, 1905 (aged 77); New York City, New York, U.S.
- Education: Derby Academy; Harvard College; Harvard Law School
- Occupation: Lawyer

James Coolidge Carter (October 14, 1827 – February 14, 1905) was a New York City lawyer, a partner in the firm that eventually became Carter Ledyard & Milburn, which he helped found in 1854.

== Early life ==
Carter was born on October 14, 1827, in Lancaster, Massachusetts. He was the youngest of eight children born to Maj. Solomon Carter.

He prepared for college at Derby Academy in Hingham. He graduated from Harvard College in 1850 and Harvard Law School in 1853. While at Harvard, he was a member of the Institute of 1777 the Hasty Pudding Club, Alpha Delta Phi, and the Phi Beta Kappa Society.

== Career ==
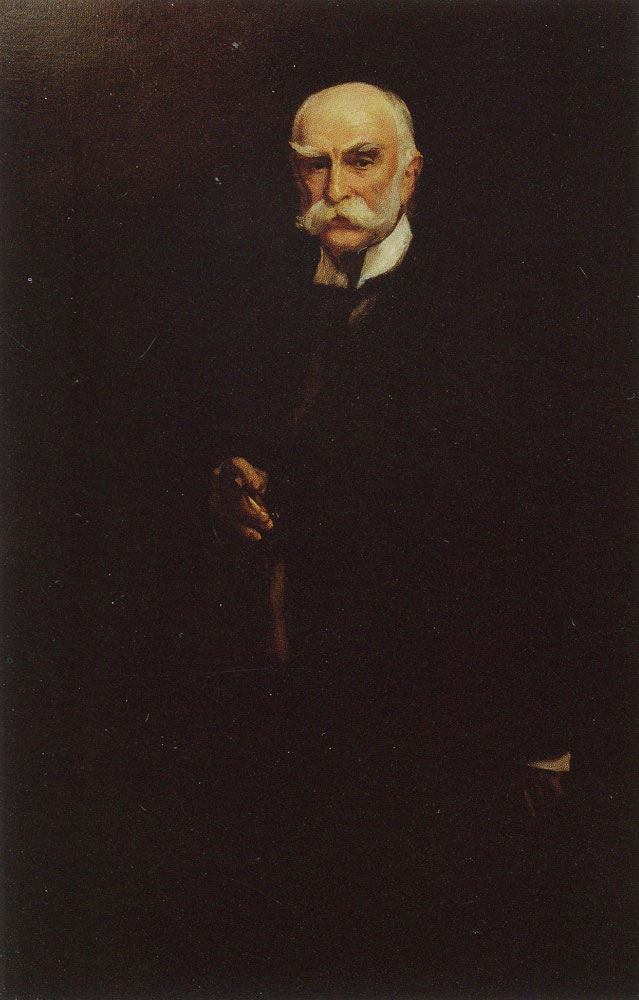
Portrait of Carter by John Singer Sargent, 1899.

Carter entered the law office of Edward Kent, son of Chancellor James Kent, in New York, and in 1853 was admitted to the bar, starting a prominent law practice which later became known as Carter Ledyard & Milburn.

He was one of the founders and the first president of the National Civic League. In 1875, Governor Samuel J. Tilden appointed him a member of the commission to devise a form of municipal administration for cities in the state of New York, and in 1888, Governor David B. Hill appointed him a member of the Constitutional Commission. In 1892, he was appointed by President Benjamin Harrison as counsel, with Edward J. Phelps and Judge Henry Williams Blodgett, to present the claims of the United States before the Bering Sea tribunal. He was elected to the American Philosophical Society in 1895 and the American Academy of Arts and Sciences in 1896.

=== Political Mugwump ===
Carter was an influential legal theorist among fellow Mugwumps. He deeply distrusted politicians and most elected officials. Instead he put his trust in disinterested experts, especially judges. He equated common law with custom, and his condemnation of legislation inconsistent with custom, reflected his Mugwumpism. He tried to synthesize traditional thinking with modernity. For example, Carter clung to support for active government intervention he learned from the antebellum Whigs, but he more and more embrace antigovernment positions typical of antebellum Jacksonians. He tried to synthesize traditional faith in timeless, objective moral principles with a more modern vision of evolving customary norms. Given growing problems of industrial urban society he saw the need for positive government but wanted judges to rule not politicians.

== Resistance to codification ==
Carter was the leader of the resistance to the codification movement led by David Dudley Field II. It is because of Carter's vigorous opposition to Field that the state of New York repeatedly refused to enact Field's civil code. As a result of Carter's efforts, large portions of contract and tort law remain mostly uncodified in New York and a majority of U.S. states, and exist in those states only in the form of case law.

== Personal life ==
After an illness of a few days, he died at 7 East 88th Street (a Beaux-Arts townhouse built in 1903 by architects James R. Turner and William G. Killian), his residence in New York City on February 14, 1905. In New York, his funeral was held at All Souls' Church on Fourth Avenue and 22nd Street. Another funeral was conducted by the Rev. Prof. Francis Greenwood Peabody of Harvard and was held at the Mount Auburn Chapel at Cambridge where he was buried.

=== Legacy ===
In 1897, he donated $5,000 towards the construction of the Randolph Tucker Memorial Hall at Washington and Lee University, estimated at that time to cost $50,000.

== Works ==
- The Provinces of the Written and the Unwritten Law: An Address Delivered at the Annual Meeting of the Virginia Bar Association, at White Alpha Springs, July 25, 1889. New York and Albany: Banks & Brothers Law Publishers. 1889 – via Internet Archive.
- Law, Its Origin, Growth and Function: Being a Course of Lectures Prepared for Delivery before the Law School of Harvard University. London and New York: G. P. Putnam's Sons. 1907 – via Internet Archive.
