= William Turner (New York politician) =

American politician from New York

Member of the New York State Assembly from Queens County's 1st District
- In office 1865–1865
- Preceded by: Charles T. Duryea
- Succeeded by: Obadiah J. Downing

Personal details
- Party: Democratic

William Turner was an American politician from New York. He served as a member of the New York State Assembly in 1865, representing Queens County's 1st District.

== Political career ==
Turner, a Democrat, was elected to the New York State Assembly and served in the 1865 session. He represented Queens County's 1st District.

During the 1865 session, Turner introduced several bills, including one to authorize a railroad in Queens County, another to incorporate the Union Gas Light Company for Kings and Queens counties, and a bill for the improvement of Park Avenue and Powers Street in Brooklyn.

In the October 1865 election, Turner was the Democratic nominee for Assembly in the First District, though his name appeared in at least one newspaper as "William Furner."

== Personal life and death ==
His burial location is unknown.

New York State Assembly
Preceded by Charles T. Duryea	New York State Assembly; Queens County, 1st District; 1865	Succeeded by Obadiah J. Downing
