= William Robert Prince =

American pioneering horticulturist

William Robert Prince (November 6, 1795 in Flushing, New York – March 28, 1869 in Flushing) was a United States horticulture pioneer.

== Biography ==
He was the son of horticulturist William Prince and Mary Stratton. He was educated at Jamaica Academy, Long Island, and at Boucherville, Canada. He imported the first merino sheep into the United States in 1816, continued the “Linnaean nurseries” of his father, and was the first to introduce silk culture and the Morus multicaulis for silk worms in 1837, but lost a large fortune by this enterprise, owing to the change in the tariff, which destroyed this industry for several years.

The troubles of the business obligated him to mortgage the Linnaean nurseries, and for a time control of them passed to Gabriel Winter, his brother-in-law. There was a printed dispute with the new owner to which the family attributed the death of his father. Prince eventually regained control of the nurseries. In 1849 he went to California, was a founder of Sacramento, and in 1851 traveled through Mexico. He introduced the culture of osiers and sorghum in 1854/5, and the Chinese yam in 1854.

Just before the American Civil War, he passed control of the nurseries on to his sons. They finally elected not to continue in it, and the nurseries were sold at the end of the war. Spiritualism and the preparation of patent medicines were major occupations of his after he retired from the nursery business.

== Works ==
- History of the Vine, with his father (New York, 1830)
- Pomological Manual, with his father (2 vols., 1832)
- Manual of Roses (1846)

He wrote numerous pamphlets on the mulberry, the strawberry, Dioscorea, medical botany, etc., and about two hundred descriptive catalogues of trees, shrubs, vines, plants, bulbs, etc. Many of his articles were published in Gardener's Monthly.

== Family ==
He married Charlotte Goodwin Collins in 1826. They were the parents of New Mexico Territorial governor L. Bradford Prince.
