= James B. Pearsall =

American politician and military officer (1827–1916)

Member of the New York State Assembly from Queens County's 1st District
- In office 1869–1870
- Preceded by: Francis Skillman
- Succeeded by: L. Bradford Prince

Personal details
- Born: James Buchanan Pearsall; March 14, 1827 Glen Cove, New York, U.S.
- Died: January 20, 1916 (aged 88) Glen Cove, New York, U.S.
- Resting place: Episcopal Churchyard, Glen Cove, New York
- Spouse: Ellenah Frost (m. 1850; died 1889)
- Children: 3
- Occupation: Politician, military officer
- Nickname: General

Military service
- Allegiance: United States
- Rank: General

James Buchanan Pearsall (March 14, 1827 – January 20, 1916) was an American politician and military officer from New York. He served as a member of the New York State Assembly from 1869 to 1870, representing Queens County's 1st District.

== Early life ==
Pearsall was born on March 14, 1827, in Glen Cove, New York, the son of Thomas Pearsall. He was baptized at the Episcopal Church in Glen Cove on September 4, 1842. He married Ellenah Frost, daughter of Jarvis Frost and Phebe Underhill, on March 14, 1850. They had three children: Frances (died young), Thomas Buchanan, and Helen Buchanan (died young). Ellenah died on June 24, 1889.

== Career ==
Pearsall was elected to the New York State Assembly and served from 1869 to 1870, representing Queens County's 1st District. During his time in the Assembly, he introduced a bill calling for the creation of a new county from the three eastern towns of Queens (Hempstead, North Hempstead, and Oyster Bay) and the Suffolk towns of Huntington, Smithtown, and Islip. The bill ultimately failed in the Senate.

Pearsall was a general, and was known for his involvement in politics and his close association with Samuel J. Tilden, the Democratic candidate for president in 1876. According to one account, Tilden "leaned heavily upon Gen. James B. Pearsall" during the campaign and the subsequent electoral commission.

== Death ==
Pearsall died on January 20, 1916, in Glen Cove, New York. He was buried in the Episcopal Churchyard in Glen Cove.

New York State Assembly
Preceded by	New York State Assembly; Queens County, 1st District; 1869–1870	Succeeded by L. Bradford Prince
