= 1921 New York state election =

- November 8, 1921

The 1921 New York state election was held on November 8, 1921, to elect a judge of the New York Court of Appeals, as well as all members of the New York State Assembly. Six amendments to the State Constitution were also proposed.

== History ==
In 1921, there was only one state officer to be elected statewide: a judge of the Court of Appeals, to succeed Emory A. Chase, who had died on June 25. William S. Andrews, who had been sitting on an additional seat by designation since 1917, was appointed to fill the vacancy until the end of the year.

State conventions had been abolished, and replaced with direct primaries since 1914. Now, a new law permitted state conventions again which the Republicans celebrated and the Democrats repudiated.

The Republican state convention met on September 22 and 23 in Syracuse. U.S. Senator William M. Calder was Permanent Chairman. The incumbent William S. Andrews was nominated for the Court of Appeals unanimously.

The Democratic state convention met on September 26 at the Hotel Commodore in New York City. Ex-Governor Al Smith was Temporary Chairman until the choice of Harriet May Mills as Permanent Chairman. Ex-Supreme Court Justice Townsend Scudder was nominated for the Court of Appeals unanimously.

== Result ==
The incumbent Republican judge was re-elected.

1921 state election result
| Office | Republican ticket | | Democratic ticket | | Socialist ticket | |
|---|---|---|---|---|---|---|
| Judge of the Court of Appeals | William S. Andrews | 1,146,337 | Townsend Scudder | 1,081,185 | Hezekiah D. Wilcox | 141,153 |

Obs.:

- "Blank and void" votes: 265,316

== Amendments ==
- Amendment 1 (Veteran Civil Service Preference) proposing to give civil service preference to war veterans was rejected: 699,679 For and 1,090,418 Against.
- Amendment 2 (Increasing Salaries of Members of Legislature) proposing to increase the salaries of the members of the New York State Legislature from $1,500 to $3,000 was rejected: 556,560 For and 1,027,624 Against.
- Amendment 3 (Literacy Test for Voters) proposing to require a literacy test for voters was accepted: 869,355 For and 632,144 Against.
- Amendment 4 (Establishing Governing Bodies in Westchester and Nassau Counties) proposing to establish governing bodies in Westchester and Nassau counties was accepted: 655,506 For and 640, 701 Against.
- Amendment 5 (Authorizing Legislature to Establish Children's Courts and Courts of Domestic Relations) proposing to authorize the Legislature to establish children's courts and courts of domestic relations was accepted: 930,929 For and 537,610 Against.
- Amendment 6 (Relative to Disposing of Old Erie Canal in Herkimer County) proposing to dispose of abandoned lands of the Erie Canal in Herkimer County was accepted: 781,665 For and 552,994 Against.

== See also ==
- New York state elections

== Sources ==
- The tickets: "Many Offices to Be Filled on Tuesday". The New York Times. November 6, 1921. pp. 1, 38.
- Result in New York City (includes mayoral election): The City Vote; Hylan's Plurality 417,986. The New York Times. November 10, 1921. p. 4.
- Result: "Andrews Elected by 65,152 Majority". The New York Times. December 16, 1921. p. 6.
