= Dwight Townsend =

American politician

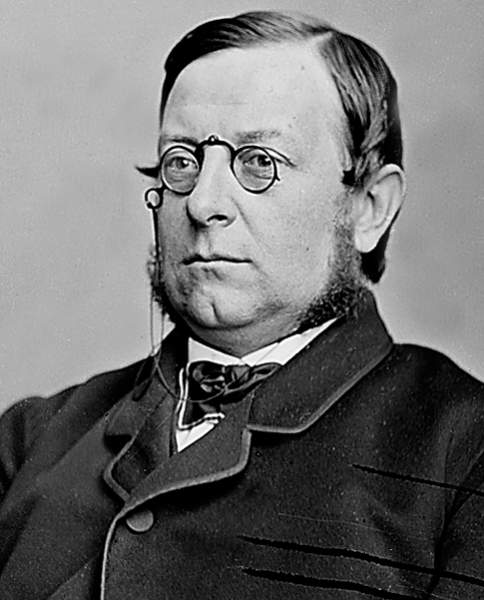

Member of the U.S. House of Representatives from New York's 1st district
- In office March 4, 1871 – March 3, 1873
- Preceded by: Henry A. Reeves
- Succeeded by: Henry J. Scudder
- In office December 5, 1864 – March 3, 1865
- Preceded by: Henry G. Stebbins
- Succeeded by: Stephen Taber

Personal details
- Born: September 26, 1826 New York City, New York, United States
- Died: October 29, 1899 (aged 73) New York City, New York, United States
- Resting place: Green-Wood Cemetery, Brooklyn, New York, United States
- Party: Democratic
- Education: Columbia Grammar & Preparatory School
- Occupation: Businessman

Dwight Townsend (September 26, 1826 – October 29, 1899) was a U.S. representative from New York. He became chairman of the Bankers' and Merchants' Telegraph Company, competitor of the Western Union

== Biography ==
Born in New York City, Townsend was educated at Columbia Grammar & Preparatory School. He worked in the sugar refining business, and was active in other ventures including the Equitable Life Assurance Society and the Bankers' and Merchants' Telegraph Company.

Townsend was elected as a Democrat to the Thirty-eighth Congress to fill the vacancy caused by the resignation of Henry G. Stebbins and served from December 5, 1864, to March 3, 1865. During this term, Townsend voted "nay" (the minority position) on the question of adopting the Thirteenth Amendment to the United States Constitution.

Townsend was elected to the Forty-second Congress (March 4, 1871 – March 3, 1873). He did not run for reelection, and resumed his former business pursuits.

== Death and burial ==
He died in New York City on October 29, 1899. He was interred at Green-Wood Cemetery in Brooklyn, New York.

U.S. House of Representatives
| Preceded by Henry G. Stebbins | Member of the U.S. House of Representatives from New York's 1st congressional district 1864–1865 | Succeeded by Stephen Taber |
| Preceded by Henry A. Reeves | Member of the U.S. House of Representatives from New York's 1st congressional district 1871–1873 | Succeeded by Henry J. Scudder |
