= Obadiah J. Downing =

American politician and Civil War officer (1835–1925)

Member of the New York State Assembly from Queens County's 1st District
- In office 1866–1866
- Preceded by: William Turner
- Succeeded by: Francis Skillman

Personal details
- Born: Obadiah Jackson Downing; April 12, 1835 Queens County, New York, U.S.
- Died: July 6, 1925 (aged 90) Dixon, Illinois, U.S.
- Spouse: Mary Yates Bluefield (m. 1872)
- Occupation: Politician, military officer

Military service
- Allegiance: United States
- Branch/service: Union Army
- Years of service: 1862–1865
- Rank: Colonel (Brevet)
- Unit: 2nd New York Cavalry
- Battles/wars: American Civil War: Second Manassas; Fredericksburg; Brandy Station; Gettysburg; Yellow Tavern

Obadiah Jackson Downing (April 12, 1835 – July 6, 1925) was an American politician and Union Army officer from New York. He served as a member of the New York State Assembly in 1866, representing Queens County's 1st District, and was a decorated Civil War veteran.

== Early life ==
Downing was born on April 12, 1835, in Queens County, New York. He was a native of Hempstead, Long Island.

== Military service ==
Downing enlisted in the 2nd New York Cavalry on August 9, 1862, a year after the start of the Civil War. He was initially commissioned as a second lieutenant and mustered into service on August 19, 1862. He rose through the ranks, being promoted to captain on December 10, 1862.

Downing fought in around 130 battles, including key engagements such as Second Manassas (1862), Fredericksburg (1862), Brandy Station (1863), and Gettysburg (1863). His conduct under fire during battles around Brandy Station in northern Virginia received praise from his superiors.

In October 1863, Downing saved his entire command of 50 men who were cut off from the rest of the Union Army by executing a daring charge straight into Rebel cavalry units.

He was taken prisoner by Confederate forces near Richmond, Virginia, after the Battle of Yellow Tavern on May 12, 1864. His capture was reported by the Richmond Examiner. He was initially held at Libby Prison in Richmond before being transferred to Camp Oglethorpe near Macon, Georgia, and then to Castle Pinckney in Charleston, South Carolina. He survived more than nine months of imprisonment and was released in a prisoner exchange on February 22, 1865.

Upon his return to the Union Army, Downing became aide-de-camp to Brigadier General George Custer, and helped lead the victory processions of the Union army in Washington, D.C. While on one of his final assignments to deliver captured Rebel flags to Washington, Downing attended the performance of Our American Cousin on the night of Abraham Lincoln's assassination. He is believed to have assisted in moving the mortally wounded president across the street to his deathbed.

Downing was brevetted colonel and mustered out of service on June 23, 1865.

== Political career ==
After resigning his commission in the army in 1865, Downing returned to Long Island and was active in the New York Legislature. He served as a member of the New York State Assembly in 1866, representing Queens County's 1st District.

== Later life and death ==
Downing later moved to Illinois, where he operated several successful businesses. On April 21, 1872, he married Mary Yates Bluefield in Kane County, Illinois. He was a member of the Grand Army of the Republic, Post No. 299.

He died on July 6, 1925, in Dixon, Illinois, at the age of 90.

New York State Assembly
Preceded by William Turner	New York State Assembly; Queens County, 1st District; 1866	Succeeded by Francis Skillman
