= Chester G. Osborne =

- Born: September 18, 1915; Portsmouth, New Hampshire, U.S.
- Died: December 26, 1987 (aged 72); Center Moriches, New York, U.S.
- Occupation: Musician
- Spouse: Mary Osborne

Chester Gorham Osborne (1915–1987) was an American composer, conductor, music instructor, trumpeter, and author. His compositions ranged from marches to opera. His writings included historical essays and children's novels.

== Life and work ==
Osborne was born on September 18, 1915, at Portsmouth, New Hampshire.

Osborne studied at the New England Conservatory in Boston, Massachusetts and majored in trumpet and composition. He completed further study at Northwestern University in Evanston, Illinois.

As an author Osborne primarily composed children's books, but also published in journals and worked on musical compositions while he also worked as a professional trumpet player and music educator.

As a music teacher, he taught in public schools in the states of Massachusetts following that he taught for many years in Center Moriches (New York). As a composer, he wrote mostly works for band and choirs, as well as chamber and ensemble music. In Center Moriches he served as director of music education for the Center Moriches school system and organized and led an outdoor summer music concert series.

He has done field work with New York archaeology teams, served as curator at the Museum Manor of St. George.

During World War II he was a trumpet player in the United States Army Band. Later he was a trumpet player in the Boston Symphony Orchestra when Arthur Fiedler conducted the orchestra. Osborne was an honorary member of the MENC (National Association for Music Education).

- 1942 "The British Eighth" March
- 1945 "Christmas Cards for Brass Sextet"
- 1946 The Silver Anchor, overture
- 1975 Connemara Sketches – A Folk Song Suite, Three Anthems
  1. The Miller's dram
  2. Along the Ocean shore
  3. The Blacksmith and his Son
- 1981 The Piper and the Captain, suite
- 1983 The Heathery Mountain
- Island Overture
- Treasure Island, for piano and orchestra

He died on December 26, 1987, at Center Moriches, New York.

=== Books ===
- The First Bow And Arrow, illustrations by Richard N. Osborne, Chicago, New York, Toronto. Wilcox & Follett Co. 1951. 88 p., (2nd, 1952; 3rd printing, 1957)
- The First Puppy, foreword by Melville J Herskovits, Dept. of Anth., NorthWestern University. illustrated by Richard N. Osborne, New York. Wilcox & Follet. 1953. 128 p., (2nd, 3rd printings)
- The First Lake Dwellers, foreword by Melville J Herskovits, Dept. of Anth., NorthWestern University. illustrated by Richard N. Osborne, New York. Follett Publishing Company, 1956. 126 p.,
- The First Wheel, illustrated by Richard N. Osborne, Chicago. Follett Publishing Co., 1959. 128 p
- The Wind and the Fire, illustrated by Rafaello Busoni. Englewood Cliffs, New Jersey, Prentice Hall Press. 1959.
- The Silver Anchor : Route of Wanderer, illustrated by Brendan Lynch, Chicago. Follett Publishing Company; 1st edition 1967. 160 p.
- The Memory String, New York. Atheneum. 1984. 154 p., ISBN 068931020X

=== Articles ===
- Long Wood, 1968.
- The Rev. Phinehas Robinson, 1969.
- Dr. Daniel Robert, 1746–1804, 1957.
- Response to Mrs Bigelows article – "The Tangier Smiths" – A few corrections and suggestions by Chester G. Osborne, 1973.

== Bibliography ==
- Paul E. Bierley, William H. Rehrig: The heritage encyclopedia of band music : composers and their music, Westerville, Ohio: Integrity Press, 1991, ISBN 0-918048-08-7
- Jaques Cattell Press: ASCAP biographical dictionary of composers, authors and publishers, Fourth edition, New York: R. R. Bowker, 1980, 589 p., ISBN 0-835212-83-1
