= Frederic Storm =

American politician (1884–1935)

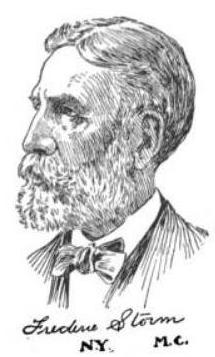

Member of the U.S. House of Representatives from New York's 1st district
- In office March 4, 1901 – March 3, 1903
- Preceded by: Townsend Scudder
- Succeeded by: Townsend Scudder

Member of the New York State Assembly from the Queens County, 2nd district
- In office January 1, 1896 – December 31, 1896
- Preceded by: James S. Fairbrother
- Succeeded by: Harvey Stewart McKnight

Personal details
- Born: July 2, 1844 Alsace, Kingdom of France
- Died: June 9, 1935 (aged 90) Bayside, New York, U.S.
- Party: Republican

Frederic Storm (July 2, 1844 – June 9, 1935) was an American politician who was a United States representative from New York from 1901 to 1903.

== Life ==
Born in Alsace in the Kingdom of France, he immigrated to the United States in 1846 with his parents, who settled in New York City. He attended the public schools of New York City and engaged in the cigar manufacturing business.

He was a delegate to the New York State Constitutional Convention of 1894; and a member of the New York State Assembly (Queens Co., 2nd D.) in 1896. He was a member of the Queens County Republican committee from 1894 to 1900 and was three times its chairman.

He was the founder of Flushing Hospital, and was elected as a Republican to the Fifty-seventh Congress, holding office from March 4, 1901, to March 3, 1903. He was an unsuccessful candidate for reelection in 1902 to the Fifty-eighth Congress, and after leaving Congress engaged in banking in Bayside. He founded the Bayside National Bank in 1905 and was its president until his resignation in 1920.

He resided in Bayside until his death in that city in 1935; interment was in Flushing Cemetery, Flushing, New York.

New York State Assembly
Preceded by James S. Fairbrother	New York State Assembly; Queens County, 2nd District; 1896	Succeeded by Harvey Stewart McKnight
U.S. House of Representatives
Preceded by Townsend Scudder	Member of the U.S. House of Representatives from New York's 1st congressional district 1901–1903	Succeeded by Townsend Scudder
