= Stephen Taber =

American farmer, businessman, and politician (1821–1886)

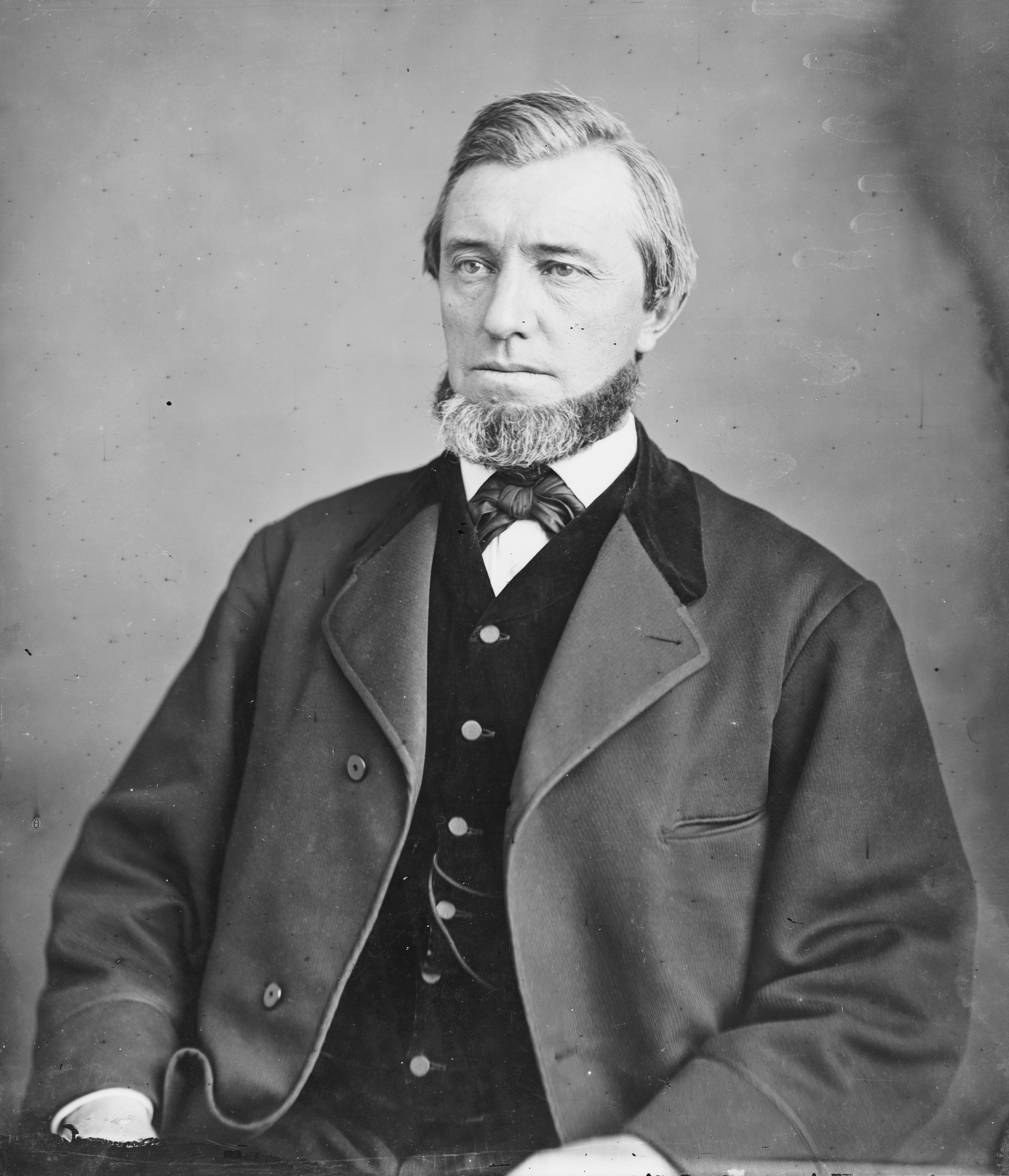

Member of the U.S. House of Representatives from New York's 1st district
- In office March 4, 1865 – March 3, 1869
- Preceded by: Dwight Townsend
- Succeeded by: Henry A. Reeves

Member of the New York State Assembly
- In office January 1, 1860 – December 31, 1861
- Preceded by: Edward A. Lawrence
- Succeeded by: Isaac Coles
- Constituency: Queens County, 1st District

Personal details
- Born: March 7, 1821 Dover, New York, U.S.
- Died: April 23, 1886 (aged 65) New York City, New York, U.S.
- Resting place: Roslyn Cemetery, Roslyn, New York
- Party: Democratic
- Spouse: Rosetta M. Townsend (m. 1845)
- Children: 5
- Relatives: Thomas Taber II (father); George T. Pierce (cousin)
- Occupation: Farmer, businessman

Stephen Taber (March 7, 1821 – April 23, 1886) was an American farmer, businessman, and politician from New York. A Democrat, he served in the New York State Assembly from 1860 to 1861 and as a U.S. representative from 1865 to 1869.

== Biography ==
Taber was born in Dover, New York on March 7, 1821, the son of Thomas Taber II and Phebe (Titus) Taber. He was educated in Dover and Poughkeepsie, then moved to Queens, New York, where he engaged in farming and business.

In addition to farming, Taber assisted in organizing the Long Island North Shore Transportation Company in 1861 and served as its president for several years. He was also a director of the Long Island Rail Road. After moving to Roslyn, New York, he became the first president of the Roslyn Savings Bank in 1876. Taber also helped establish a steamboat route between Roslyn and New York City. As a booster of Roslyn's local economy, Taber took steps to make the village a tourist attraction, including constructing an observation tower and picnic area at the top of Harbor Hill, where Clarence Hungerford Mackay later constructed a mansion.

=== Political career ===
A Democrat, Taber was a member of the New York State Assembly (Queens County, 1st District) in 1860 and 1861.

In 1864, he was elected to the United States House of Representatives. He was re-elected in 1866 and served in the 39th and 40th Congresses (March 4, 1865 – March 3, 1869).

=== Death ===
Taber died in New York City on April 23, 1886. He was buried at Roslyn Cemetery in Roslyn.

== Family ==
In 1845, Taber married Rosetta M. Townsend. They were the parents of five children: Samuel T., William T., Adelaide, Gertrude, and Thomas T.

Taber was the first cousin of George T. Pierce, who served in the New York State Assembly and New York State Senate.

New York State Assembly
Preceded by Edward A. Lawrence	New York State Assembly; Queens County, 1st District; 1860–1861	Succeeded by Isaac Coles
U.S. House of Representatives
Preceded by Dwight Townsend	Member of the U.S. House of Representatives from New York's 1st congressional district 1865–1869	Succeeded by Henry A. Reeves
