= Henry Augustus Reeves =

American politician

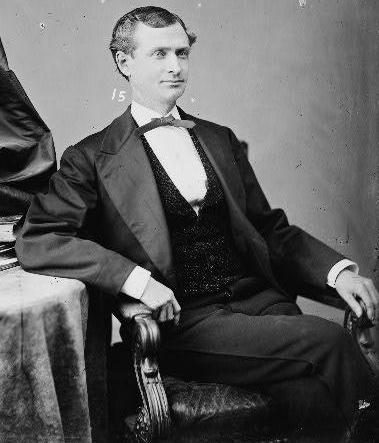

Member of the U.S. House of Representatives from New York's 1st district
- In office March 4, 1869 – March 3, 1871
- Preceded by: Stephen Taber
- Succeeded by: Dwight Townsend

Personal details
- Born: December 7, 1832 Sag Harbor, New York, US
- Died: March 4, 1916 (aged 83) Greenport, New York, US
- Party: Democratic
- Education: Union College, Schenectady, New York

Henry Augustus Reeves (December 7, 1832 – March 4, 1916) was an American lawyer and politician who served one term as a U.S. representative from New York from 1869 to 1871.

== Biography ==
Born in Sag Harbor, New York, Reeves attended private schools in Sag Harbor, the Southampton Academy, the University of Michigan at Ann Arbor for three years, and graduated from Union College, Schenectady, New York, in 1852. He studied law. He was admitted to the bar.

He edited the Republican Watchman in Greenport from 1858 until his death.

=== Congress ===
Reeves was elected as a Democrat to the Forty-first Congress (March 4, 1869 – March 3, 1871). He resumed newspaper interests.

=== Later career and death ===
He was the supervisor of Southold Town from 1872 to 1894. He was a member of the New York State Assembly (Suffolk Co.) in 1887. He served as member of the State commission in lunacy from 1889 to 1897.

He died in Greenport, New York on March 4, 1916. He was interred in Southampton Cemetery, Southampton, New York.

== Sources ==
- United States Congress. "Henry Augustus Reeves (id: R000138)". Biographical Directory of the United States Congress.

U.S. House of Representatives
Preceded by Stephen Taber	Member of the U.S. House of Representatives from New York's 1st congressional district 1869–1871	Succeeded by Dwight Townsend
New York State Assembly
Preceded by Henry E. Huntting	New York State Assembly; Suffolk County; 1887	Succeeded by Henry E. Huntting
