= Center Moriches, New York =

- Hamlet and census-designated place
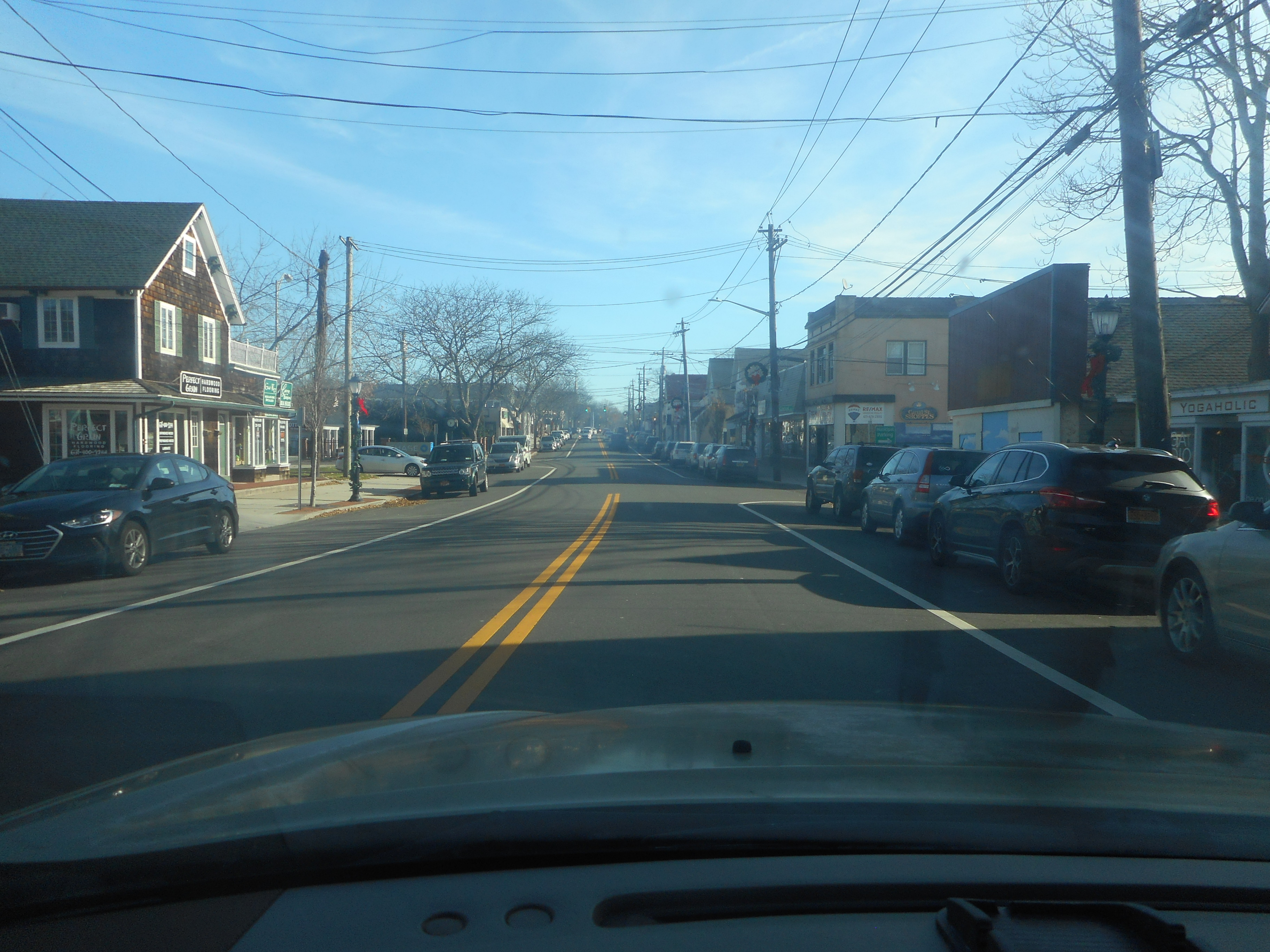
- Eastbound Main Street in Downtown Center Moriches in November 2019

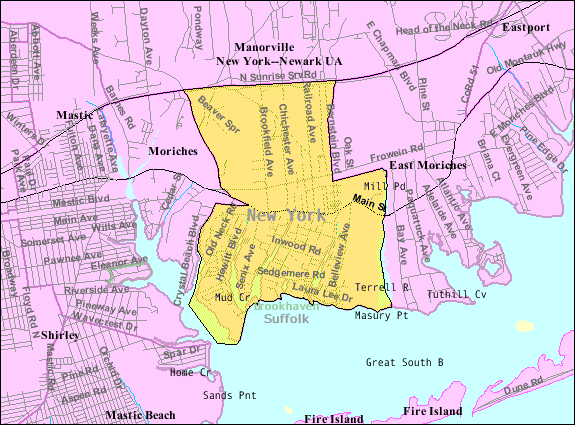
- U.S. Census map

- Location on Long Island Location in state of New York
- Coordinates: 40°47′52″N 72°47′50″W
- Country: United States
- State: New York
- County: Suffolk
- Town: Brookhaven

Area
  - Total: 6.04 sq mi (15.65 km^{2})
  - Land: 5.26 sq mi (13.63 km^{2})
  - Water: 0.78 sq mi (2.02 km^{2})
- Elevation: 26 ft (8 m)

Population (2020)
  - Total: 8,046
  - Density: 1,528.7/sq mi (590.22/km^{2})
- Time zone: UTC−05:00 (Eastern Time Zone)
  - Summer (DST): UTC−04:00
- ZIP Code: 11934
- Area codes: 631, 934
- FIPS code: 36-13420
- GNIS feature ID: 0969982

Center Moriches (/moʊˈrɪtʃɪz/ moh-RITCH-iz) is a hamlet and census-designated place in Suffolk County, New York, United States. As of the 2020 census, Center Moriches had a population of 8,046. Center Moriches is in the town of Brookhaven. It is the location of the historic Masury Estate Ballroom and Terry-Ketcham Inn, both listed on the National Register of Historic Places.

The name Moriches comes from Meritces, a Native American who owned land on Moriches Neck.

== Geography ==
According to the United States Census Bureau, the CDP has a total area of 5.6 square miles (14.6 km^{2}), of which 5.2 square miles (13.5 km^{2}) is land and 0.42 square miles (1.1 km^{2}), or 7.36%, is water.

Historical population
Census	Pop.	Note	%±
2000	6,655		—
2010	7,580		13.9%
2020	8,046		6.1%
U.S. Decennial Census

== Demographics ==
=== 2020 census ===
As of the 2020 census, Center Moriches had a population of 8,046. The median age was 40.9 years. 22.3% of residents were under the age of 18 and 15.7% of residents were 65 years of age or older. For every 100 females there were 98.4 males, and for every 100 females age 18 and over there were 96.8 males age 18 and over.

97.9% of residents lived in urban areas, while 2.1% lived in rural areas.

There were 2,770 households in Center Moriches, of which 35.3% had children under the age of 18 living in them. Of all households, 59.0% were married-couple households, 12.9% were households with a male householder and no spouse or partner present, and 21.5% were households with a female householder and no spouse or partner present. About 18.8% of all households were made up of individuals and 9.7% had someone living alone who was 65 years of age or older.

There were 2,960 housing units, of which 6.4% were vacant. The homeowner vacancy rate was 1.3% and the rental vacancy rate was 4.5%.

Racial composition as of the 2020 census
Race	Number	Percent
White	6,505	80.8%
Black or African American	259	3.2%
American Indian and Alaska Native	41	0.5%
Asian	110	1.4%
Native Hawaiian and Other Pacific Islander	3	0.0%
Some other race	524	6.5%
Two or more races	604	7.5%
Hispanic or Latino (of any race)	1,129	14.0%

=== 2000 census ===
As of the census of 2000, there were 6,655 people, 2,319 households, and 1,776 families residing in the CDP. The population density was 1,327.2 inhabitants per square mile (512.4/km^{2}). There were 2,465 housing units at an average density of 491.6 per square mile (189.8/km^{2}). The racial makeup of the CDP was 90.02% White, 5.24% African American, 0.17% Native American, 0.99% Asian, 1.29% from other races, and 2.28% from two or more races. Hispanic or Latino of any race were 6.61% of the population.

There were 2,319 households, out of which 36.2% had children under the age of 18 living with them, 62.7% were married couples living together, 9.4% had a female householder with no husband present, and 23.4% were non-families. 17.4% of all households were made up of individuals, and 6.8% had someone living alone who was 65 years of age or older. The average household size was 2.83 and the average family size was 3.20.

In the CDP, the population was spread out, with 25.1% under the age of 18, 7.0% from 18 to 24, 32.9% from 25 to 44, 22.8% from 45 to 64, and 12.1% who were 65 years of age or older. The median age was 37 years. For every 100 females, there were 97.3 males. For every 100 females age 18 and over, there were 95.1 males.

=== Income and poverty ===
For 2016, the median income for a household in the CDP was $95,932. The per capita income for the CDP was $38,431. About 4.5% of families and 6.5% of the population were below the poverty threshold, including 7.6% of those under age 18 and 9.7% of those age 65 or over.

== Schools ==
The hamlet has four public schools, all operated by the Center Moriches Union Free School District: Clayton Huey Elementary School, Center Moriches Middle School, and Center Moriches High School. The middle school and high school are part of the same building. There is also a private Catholic school, Our Lady Queen of Apostles Regional Catholic School, which is located behind St. John the Evangelist Church.

== Media ==
Radio station WJVC at 96.1 FM is licensed to serve Center Moriches.

Center Moriches features in the episode “On a Country Road” of the 1950s CBS Radio drama Suspense, starring Cary Grant.

== Notable people ==
- Marvin Bell - First poet laureate of Iowa
- Charles T. Duryea - member of the New York State Assembly
- Charles S. Havens - member of the New York State Assembly
- John S. Havens - member of the New York State Assembly
- Jeff LeBlanc - American singer-songwriter
- Anthony Leone - American mixed martial artist
- Linda Lovelace - Actor, author
- Ferdinand Marcos – Filipino politician, lawyer, and kleptocrat
- Imelda Marcos – Filipina politician and convicted criminal
- Chester G. Osborne - American composer, music educator, writer, and trumpeter
- Caroline Rose - American singer, songwriter, and musician
- Sue Wicks - Former WNBA player and WNBA Hall Of Famer.
- Paul Gibson (baseball) - Former Major League Baseball player.

== See also ==
- List of census-designated places in New York
- Lamb's Chapel v. Center Moriches Union Free School District
