= George F. Carman =

American politician

George Franklin Carmam (April 18, 1827 – September 30, 1891) was an American politician from Patchogue, New York.

== Life ==
Carman was born on April 18, 1827 in Patchogue, New York, the son of Gilbert Carman and Mary Ann Homan. His great-grandfather Stephen Carman was a member of the New York State Legislature for 31 years, from 1788 to 1819.

Carman grew up spending his summers on the farm and his winters at the district school. He began learning the carpenter's trade when he was 16. Four years later, he went with three acquaintances to Greenport and joined the whaling ship Nile under Captain Isaac Case. The whaling voyage lasted 37 months and took him across the whole length of the Pacific Ocean four times. When he returned home, he began working as a builder and contractor.

In 1855, Cartman was the American Party candidate for Sheriff of Suffolk County and won the election. Earlier that year, he was elected one of the seven Town Trustees and one of the two Overseers of the Poor. He moved to Riverhead upon his election as Sheriff. Three years later, he served as Under-Sheriff to his successor Stephen J. Wilson. He later resigned that office and returned to Patchogue. He then became editor and proprietor of the Suffolk County Herald, and he served as editor of the paper until 1862. In that year, President Abraham Lincoln appointed him Collector of Internal Revenue of the First District of New York. He was reappointed to that office in 1863. He resigned as Collector in 1869.

Charman then became general manager of the South Side Railroad Company, which was headed by Charles Fox at the time. Two years later, the road was sold to Jacob R. Shiphard & Co. The road returned to the original stockholders after a year, with Carman now serving as president and Charles Fox as vice-president. The road and the company were left poorly managed under Shiphard, and after six months of trying to improve the company Carman handed it over to the United States Marshal and declared it bankrupt. Judge Benedict appointed Charles Jones as receiver in bankruptcy, with Carman as his representative to run the road until it was bought by Conrad Poppenhusen in a public sale. In 1870, he bought the Orange Railroad (which ran from Hunter's Point to Winfield) from Orange Judd for $100,000 and sold it to the South Side Company.

In 1859, Carman ran for the New York State Assembly in the Suffolk County 2nd District with the Republican and American Parties. He lost to the Democratic incumbent Richard J. Cornelius. He was originally a Free Soil Democrat and supported Millard Fillmore in the 1856 United States presidential election. Shortly afterwards, he became an active member of the Republican Party. In 1870, he was elected to the New York State Assembly as a Republican, representing Suffolk County. He served in the Assembly in 1871. He ran again in 1878, and his opponent Charles T. Duryea received the canvassers' certificate. But in February 1879, Duryea was unseated and Carman was declared the winner by a single vote. He served for the rest of 1879.

Carman supported Horace Greeley and the Liberal Republicans in the 1872 United States presidential election. In the 1880 Republican National Convention, he controlled the 19 Long Island delegates and helped oppose Ulysses S. Grant's candidacy. A Half-Breed, he supported Rutherford B. Hayes and James A. Garfield but opposed Chester A. Arthur and Roscoe Conkling. Conkling in particular opposed him, and when Arthur became president Conkling had the Patchogue postmaster (who had Carman's favor) removed from the position, breaking Carman's political influence. He then served as president of the Patchogue Bank from its organization until his death, and was president of the Board of Education for ten years.

In 1850, Carman married Ellen Prior, daughter of Captain John Prior of Patchogue. Their children were Arrington Carman (a Justice of the Peace of Brookhaven) and Mrs. Captain John Prior.

Carman died at home on September 30, 1891. He was buried in the Carman family plot in the Patchogue cemetery.

New York State Assembly
Preceded by Brinley D. Sleight	New York State Assembly; Suffolk County; 1871	Succeeded by John S. Marcy
Preceded by Charles T. Duryea	New York State Assembly; Suffolk County; 1879	Succeeded by Everett A. Carpenter
