= Francis Skillman =

American politician, judge, and genealogist (1817–1898)

Member of the New York State Assembly from Queens County's 1st District
- In office 1867–1868
- Preceded by: Obadiah J. Downing
- Succeeded by: James B. Pearsall

Justice of Sessions of Queens County
- In office 1861–1863

Justice of the Peace of North Hempstead
- In office 1851–1876

Personal details
- Born: September 1, 1817 Wallabout, Brooklyn, New York, U.S.
- Died: September 7, 1898 (aged 81) Roslyn, New York, U.S.
- Party: Democratic
- Spouse(s): Sarah Ann Schenck (m. 1842; died 1864) Josephine D. Onderdonk (m. 1865)
- Children: 1
- Occupation: Farmer, judge, politician, genealogist

Francis Skillman (September 1, 1817 – September 7, 1898) was an American farmer, judge, politician, and genealogist from New York. He served as a member of the New York State Assembly in 1867 and 1868, representing Queens County's 1st District.

== Early life ==
Skillman was born on September 1, 1817, at Wallabout, an area near what is now the Brooklyn Navy Yard, to Thomas Skillman (1791–1841) and Catherine Onderdonk (1792–1868). As a boy, he moved to Manhasset, Long Island, to live with his grandfather.

== Career ==
Skillman married Sarah Ann Schenck in 1842. After marrying, he moved to Roslyn, Long Island. Manhasset and Roslyn are both part of North Hempstead, where Skillman served as Justice of the Peace from 1851 to 1876. He was elected Justice of the Peace at the Annual Town Meeting of North Hempstead held on April 1, 1851, and continued to serve for the next 24 years until 1875.

From 1861 to 1863, Skillman served as Justice of Sessions of Queens County.

Skillman, a Democrat, was elected to the New York State Assembly and served in 1867 and 1868, representing Queens County's 1st District. A political poster from his campaign reads: "Democratic Nomination for member of assembly Francis Skillman."

In 1892, Skillman published a family history, The Skillmans of New York, tracing the lineage of the Skillman family back to the early 17th century. At the age of 72, he was elected to the School Board in 1889 and remained until 1890.

== Personal life ==
Skillman's first wife, Sarah Ann Schenck, died in 1864. In 1865, he married Josephine D. Onderdonk. They had one child, Elizabeth, born in 1871.

Skillman died at his home in Roslyn on September 7, 1898, at the age of 81. His burial location is unknown.

New York State Assembly
Preceded by	New York State Assembly; Queens County, 1st District; 1867–1868	Succeeded by James B. Pearsall
