= Friends Academy =

Quaker school in Glen Cove, New York, US

Coordinates: 40°51′53″N 73°35′46″W

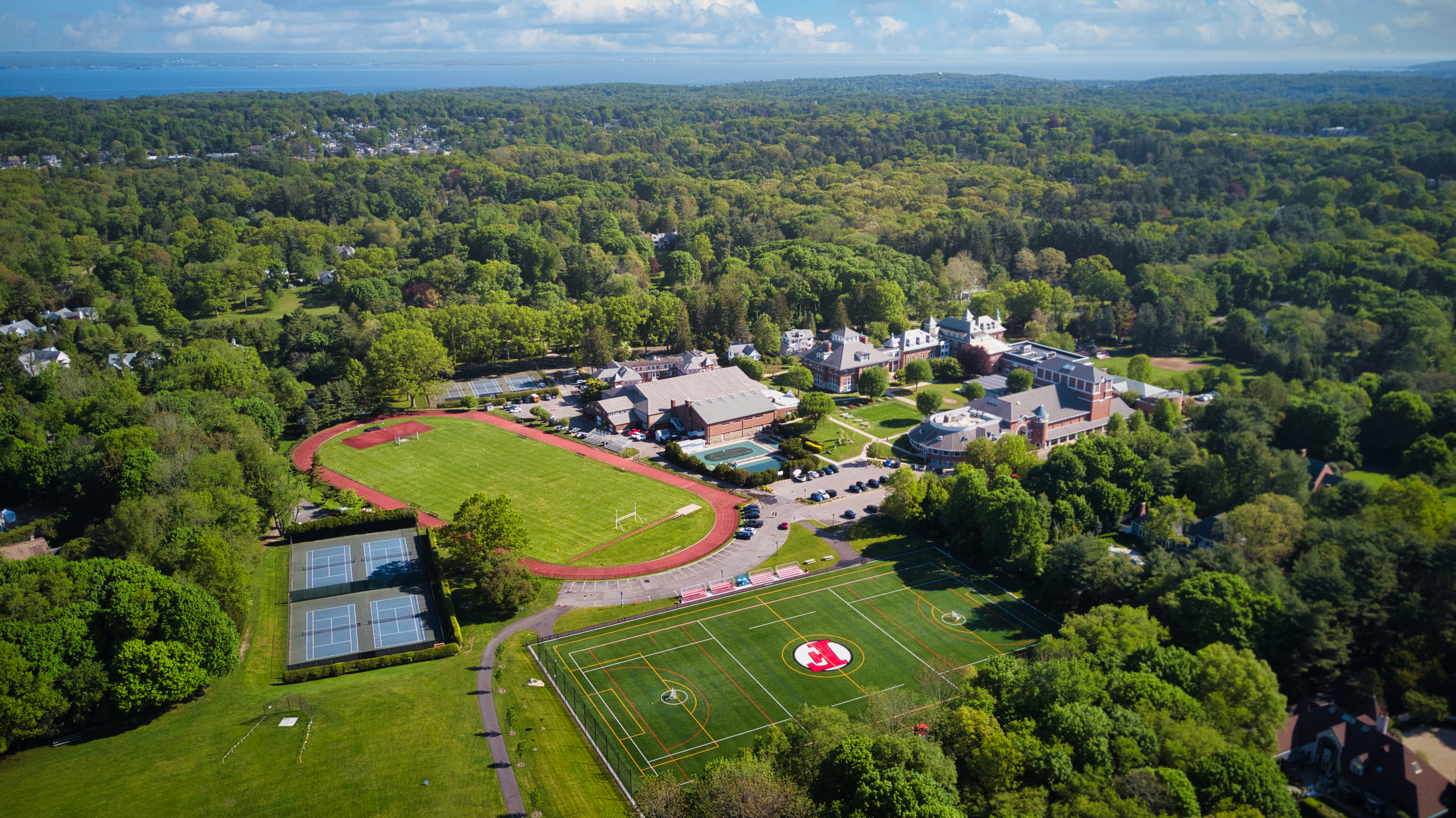
- Aerial Photograph of Friends Academy. Photographed by Joshua Sukoff '22
- Glen Cove, New York; USA

Information
- Type: Private co-ed
- Motto: Strong Minds. Kind Hearts.
- Established: April 17, 1876
- Founder: Gideon Frost
- Head of school: Alfred (Rik) F. Dugan III
- Grades: Nursery School – 12th grade
- Campus: Suburban, 65 acres (26 ha)
- Colors: Red and Black
- Mascot: Quaker
- Yearbook: The Lamp
- Website: www.friendsacademy.org

Friends Academy is a Quaker, coeducational, independent, college preparatory school serving students from nursery school through the twelfth grade, located in Locust Valley, New York, United States. The school was founded in 1876 by 78-year-old Gideon Frost for "The children of Friends and those similarly sentimented." The school was originally named Friends College. The campus covers 65 acres. The school is organized around a lush, grassy quad with buildings surrounding it. Recent additions to the school include the Helen A. Dolan Center (2000), the Kumar Wang Library (2000), the renovation of the Upper School (2004), the renovation of the Lower School (2010), the construction of the gym and field house (2007), and the renovation of the Middle School (2016).

== Students and colleagues ==
There are approximately 650 students from various backgrounds and communities throughout Long Island. There are 160 students in the Lower School, 139 in the Middle School, and 341 in the Upper School. There are approximately 150 full- and part-time colleagues, including 98 faculty – of whom 78% hold advanced degrees.

== Athletics ==
Friends Academy offers a variety of sports for students in grades 5–12. Sports consist of boys and girls basketball, boys and girls soccer, boys and girls cross country, boys and girls track and field, boys and girls lacrosse, boys baseball, girls softball, boys and girls ice hockey, girls field hockey, boys and girls crew, girls tennis, girls cheerleading, and boys football. Andy Coe (captain of Yale '69 football team) coached football at Friends Academy in 1970. For 30 + years Ron Baskind coached the Quakers to countless playoff appearances and successful seasons. During the 2015 season, the Quakers made the Conference 4 Football playoffs. The last homecoming football win for the Quakers was on October 13, 2018 as the Quakers defeated Great Neck Co-Op by a score of 37-16. The Quakers finished that season 3-5 narrowly missing the playoffs. Friends Academy participates in the Nassau County Public High School Athletic Association. Friends Academy is the only school to participate in the Nassau County Public High School Athletic Association as an independent school. Despite playing in a larger conference, Friends Academy has won several Regional and State titles in different sports in recent years. FA has won State Championships in Boys Basketball ('10, '11), Boys Soccer ('09, '10, '11,'13), Girls Soccer ('12), Women's rowing ('06, '08, '09, '10) and Regional Titles in Girls Field Hockey ('12), Girls Basketball ('11).

== Arts ==
Friends Academy offers a wide variety of arts courses for students in grades PK–12. Music, Dance, Visual and Digital Art, and Theater are required parts of the curriculum for students through the 8th grade. In the high school, a wide variety of courses are offered as electives. The Visual Arts program has a working dark room and a digital media lab. The Music Department has a number of performing groups, including wind ensemble, orchestra, chamber choir, and a high school jazz band. The Theater and Dance department operates in a 400-seat proscenium theater. There is a working scene shop. The curriculum includes dance, acting, playwriting, and technical theater. The school produces four productions each school year.

== Quaker Values ==
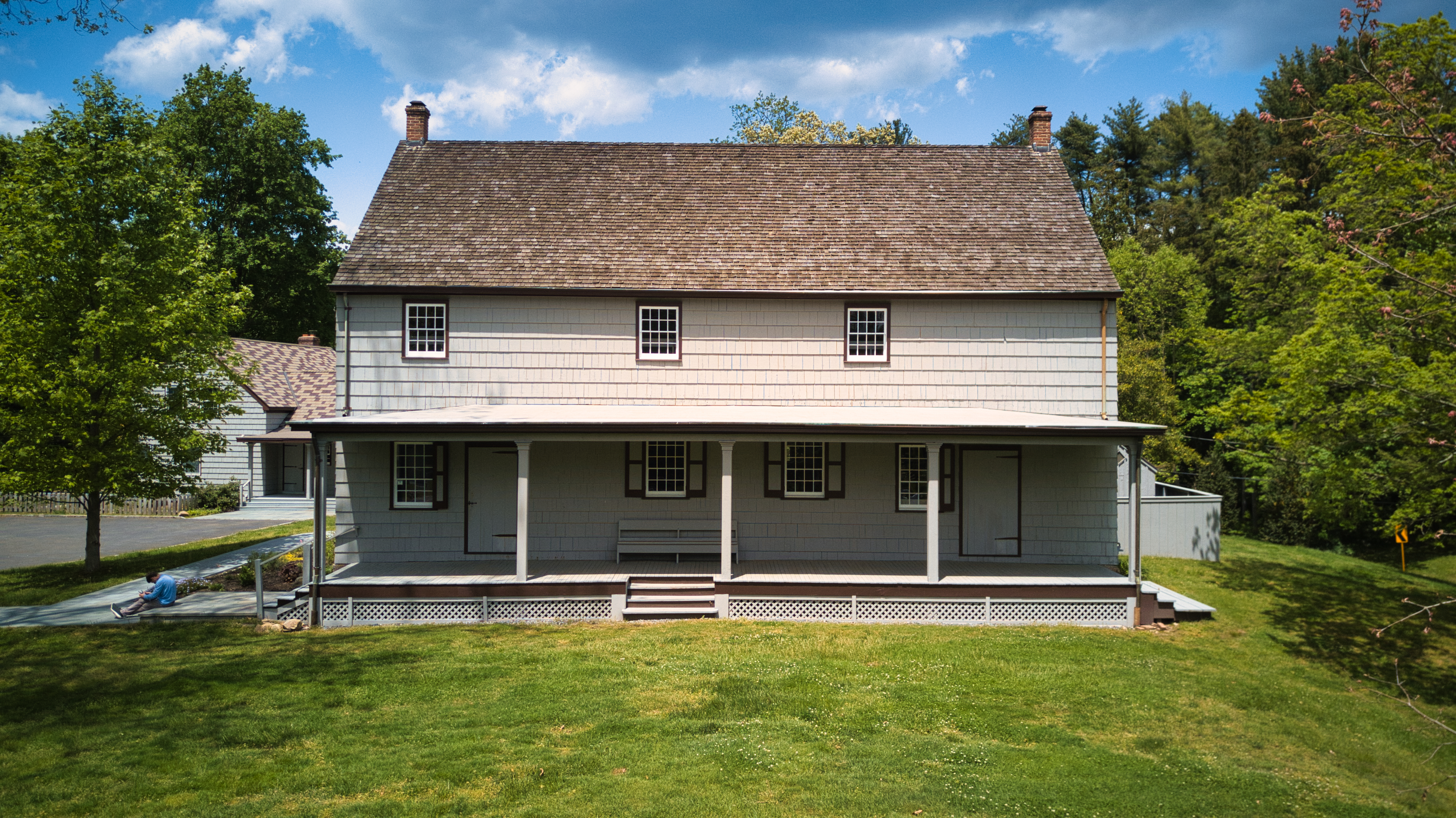
The Matinecock Meeting House Photographed by Joshua Sukoff '22

Friends Academy has been teaching students Quaker Values since 1876. Friends Academy believes that in teaching Quaker Values, students will mold their minds and personalities to match the very values that they teach. Quaker Values mainly reflect on truth, morality, and conscience as believed by the Quakers themselves. To uphold the tradition of Quaker Values, the students and faculty of Friends Academy attend the Matinecock Meeting House weekly to attend "Meeting for Worship", a traditional Quaker tradition where the students and faculty sit silently to reflect.

== Notable people ==
=== Alumni ===
- Alexandra Ansanelli, ballet dancer
- Franklin A. Coles, lawyer
- Will Roland, actor
- Chuck Cooperstein, radio presenter
- J. P. Foschi, football player
- Heather Lende, author
- Sebastian Arcelus, actor
- Renauld Williams, football player
- Frank Posillico, Dry January inventor
- Melissa Errico, actress, singer, recording artist and writer
- Steven Mills, sports executive
- Brian Koppelman, showrunner
- Jessica Goodman, author
- Melissa Korn, journalist
- Ethan Lazar, film producer
- Katie Sands, news anchor
- Lucas Foglia, photographer
- Dion Short Metzger, doctor, media health expert
- Lindsay Jill Roth, TV creator, producer, and author

=== Faculty ===
- William W. Cocks, politician
- Peter John Philander, South African poet
- Nikara Warren, jazz musician
- Liza Talusan, author
