= William W. Cocks =

American politician (1861–1932)

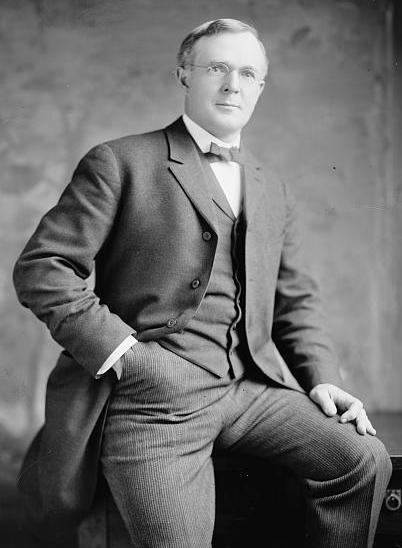

Member of the U.S. House of Representatives from New York's 1st district
- In office March 4, 1905 – March 3, 1911
- Preceded by: Townsend Scudder
- Succeeded by: Martin W. Littleton

Member of the New York State Assembly (Queens and Nassau Co.)
- In office 1904

Member of the New York State Senate (2nd District)
- In office 1901–1902

Personal details
- Born: William Willets Cocks; July 24, 1861 Old Westbury, New York, US
- Died: May 24, 1932 (aged 70) Old Westbury, New York, US
- Resting place: Friends Cemetery, Westbury
- Party: Republican
- Education: Swarthmore College

William Willets Cocks (July 24, 1861 – May 24, 1932) was an American politician who served three terms representing New York from 1905 to 1911.

== Life ==
Born in Old Westbury, Long Island, he attended private schools and Swarthmore College. He engaged in agricultural pursuits.

=== Early political career ===
He was elected Commissioner of Highways of the Town of North Hempstead in 1894, and was re-elected in 1896 and again in 1898. He was a member of the New York State Senate (2nd D.) in 1901 and 1902; a member of the New York State Assembly (Queens and Nassau Co.) in 1904; and a delegate to the 1908 Republican National Convention.

=== Congress ===
Cocks was elected as a Republican to the 59th, 60th and 61st United States Congresses, holding office from March 4, 1905, to March 3, 1911.

=== Later career and death ===
William Cocks was a member of the board of managers of Swarthmore College and was president of the Friends Academy in Locust Valley. He was vice president of the Roslyn Savings Bank and a director of the Bank of Westbury and the Bank of Hicksville. Cocks was President of the Village of Old Westbury from its incorporation in 1924 until his death there in 1932; interment was in Friends Cemetery, Westbury.

=== Family ===
His son, William Burling "Burley" Cocks (1915–1998) was a U.S. Hall of Fame trainer of Thoroughbred racehorses.

Congressman Frederick Cocks Hicks was a brother to William W. Cocks.

New York State Senate
Preceded by James Norton	New York State Senate; 2nd District; 1901–1902	Succeeded by Luke A. Keenan
New York State Assembly
Preceded by George W. Doughty	New York State Assembly; Queens and Nassau Counties; 1904	Succeeded by William G. Miller
U.S. House of Representatives
Preceded by Townsend Scudder	Member of the U.S. House of Representatives from New York's 1st congressional district 1905–1911	Succeeded by Martin W. Littleton
