= Joseph M. Belford =

American politician

Joseph McCum Belford
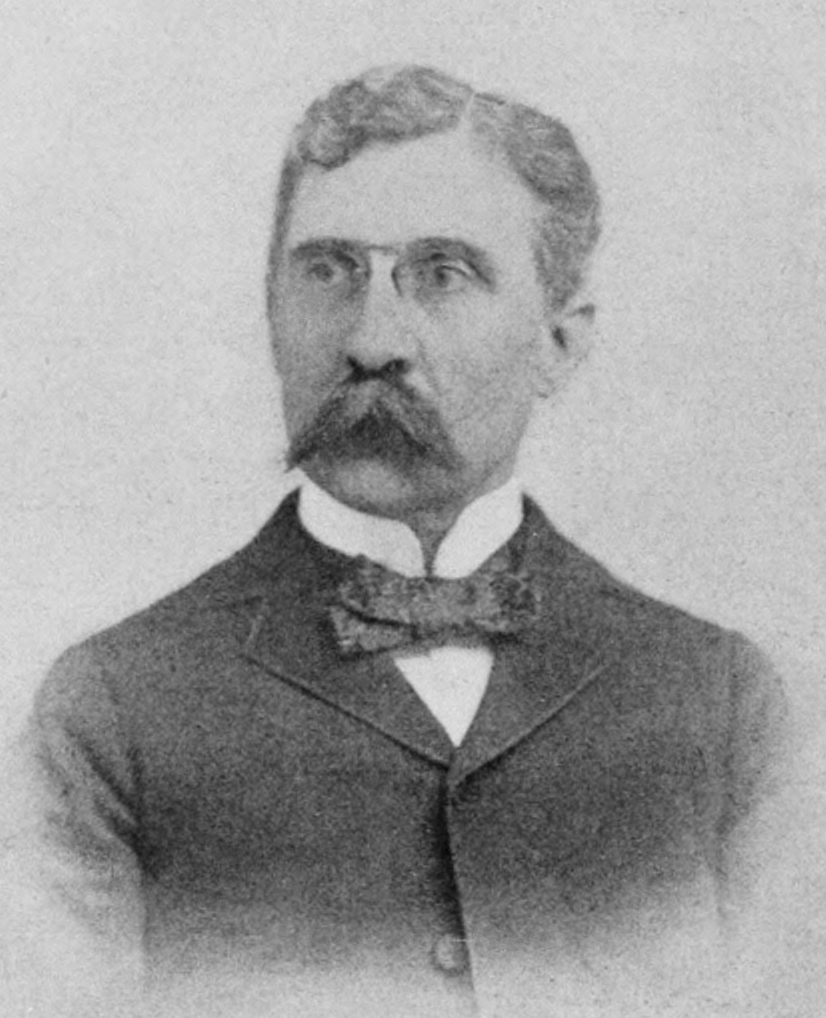

Member of the U.S. House of Representatives from New York's 1st district
- In office March 4, 1897 – March 3, 1899
- Preceded by: Richard Cunningham McCormick
- Succeeded by: Townsend Scudder

Personal details
- Born: August 5, 1852 Mifflintown, Juniata County, Pennsylvania, US
- Died: May 3, 1917 (aged 64) Manhattan, New York, US
- Party: Republican
- Spouse: Inez H. Belford
- Education: Dickinson College
- Profession: Lawyer; Politician; Banker

Joseph McCum Belford (August 5, 1852 – May 3, 1917) was an American politician and a United States Representative from New York.

== Biography ==
Born in Mifflintown, Juniata County, Pennsylvania, Belford attended Lycoming College in Williamsport, Pennsylvania. He graduated from Dickinson College in 1871 and was a member of Phi Kappa Psi. His wife was Inez H. Belford.

== Career ==
Belford moved to Riverhead, New York, in 1884 and taught at the Franklinville and Riverhead Academies. He studied law, was admitted to the bar in 1889, and practiced in Riverhead. He served as secretary and chairman of the Suffolk County Republican committee and was clerk of the county surrogate court.

Elected as a Republican to the 55th Congress, Belford represented New York's 1st congressional district from March 4, 1897 to March 3, 1899. He was not a candidate for renomination in 1898 to the 56th Congress and in 1900 was a delegate to the Republican National Convention in Philadelphia.

Resuming the practice of law in Riverhead (town), New York, Belford also engaged in banking. He served as surrogate judge of Suffolk County from 1904 to 1910.

== Death ==
Belford died suddenly at Grand Central Station in Manhattan on May 3, 1917. He was interred at Riverhead Cemetery in Riverhead.

State Senator Edward Hawkins (1829–1908) was his father-in-law; Congressman James Burns Belford (1837–1910) of Colorado was his cousin.

U.S. House of Representatives
Preceded by Richard Cunningham McCormick	Member of the U.S. House of Representatives from New York's 1st congressional district March 4, 1897 – March 3, 1899	Succeeded by Townsend Scudder
