= Masury Estate Ballroom =

- U.S. National Register of Historic Places
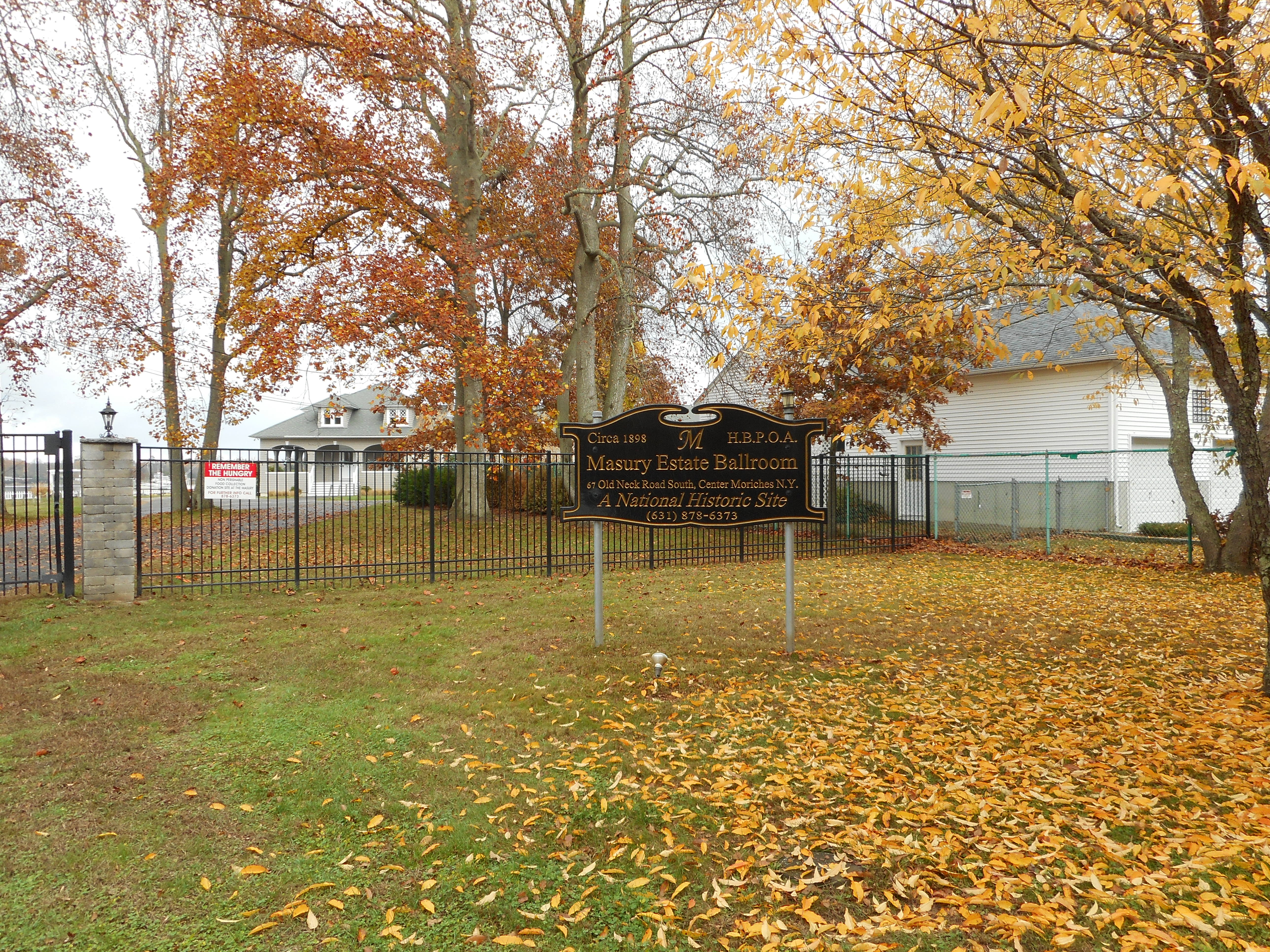
- Sign for the historic Masury Estate Ballroom.

- Location within New York Location within the United States
- Location: 67 Old Neck Road South, Center Moriches, New York
- Coordinates: 40°46′54″N 72°48′26″W
- Area: 1.5 acres (0.61 ha)
- Built: 1898
- Architect: Lambert, William
- Architectural style: Shingle Style
- NRHP reference No.: 86002513
- Added to NRHP: September 11, 1986

Masury Estate Ballroom is a historic ballroom located at Center Moriches in Suffolk County, New York. It was built about 1898 and was originally part of the Masury family estate. It is a long, one story, Shingle Style wood-frame building with a "T" shaped plan. The main upper portion contains the ballroom, while a bowling alley and a billiards room are contained in the base. The building sits on a brick foundation and features a broad hip roof with hip roof dormers. The estate house was dismantled following the New England Hurricane of 1938, but the ballroom remained in use and is now owned by the Holiday Beach Property Owners Association.

It was added to the National Register of Historic Places in 1986.

== History ==
John W. Masury earned his fortune in the paint industry. The National Registry of Historic Places credits him for the invention of the metal paint can. He bought a large tract of beachfront land in the late 18th century, intending to create an estate and family retreat. He died in 1895 before he was able to complete this project. In 1898, his widow Grace Harkins Masury hired architect William Lambert to complete a mansion on the estate in the Colonial Revival Style. The estate's buildings were wood-frame in the shingle style prevalent on waterfront estates at the turn of the century.

The great hurricane of 1938 leveled the mansion, but the ballroom endured, hosting parties for servicemen during the years of WWII. The Masury family sold the ballroom to Walter Hewitt in 1954. Walter Hewitt, subdivided the property and built new houses on the land, and the ballroom was sold to the Holiday Beach homeowners association, the current owners of the ballroom.

== Landmark ==
The Masury Estate Ballroom was recognized by the National Register of Historic Places in 1986.
