= Edwin Bailey (politician) =

Edwin Bailey (February 18, 1836 – January 11, 1908) was an English-American businessman and politician from Patchogue, New York.

== Life ==
Bailey was born on February 18, 1836, in Manchester, England.

In 1848, Bailey immigrated to America with his parents, Joseph and Ann Bailey. His father, a machinist, opened a business in Philadelphia, Pennsylvania, but he fell ill and died within two months. Ann then moved to Patchogue, New York and married Treadwell Kellum of Babylon. Edwin spent a year working on a farm in Monmouth County, New Jersey, after which he joined his mother in Patchogue. He then spent a year in a cotton factory, after which he worked on a vessel that traveled up and down the Great South Bay. When he was 17, he began apprenticing as a carpenter under Charles A. Woodhull of Sayville. He was pronounced a competent workman three years later and began working as a carpenter in Patchogue. He left the trade after a year.

In 1870, Bailey began working as a lumber merchant. He initially conducted the business alone, but he later spent three and a half years in a partnership with O. S. Smith, followed by another three and a half years with Martinus Smith. He then spent four years working alone, after which he organized the firm E. Bailey & Sons with his sons Joseph and Edwin Jr. By 1896, the firm's sales reached half a million dollars and sold everything related to builders' materials all over the county. The firm also had its own boats (one of which could carry four hundred thousand feet of lumber), a sash, door, and blind factory in Patchogue, a planting mill in Islip, and a lumber yard in Islip they purchased in 1889. He built the Union Free School in 1868 and served on its Board of Education ever since. He was also a director and incorporator of the Patchogue Bank, a stockholder and director of the Electric-Light Company, the advisory committee chairman of the Mechanics and Marine Lloyds of New York, and chief of the fire department since its organization in 1880.

Bailey served as Second Lieutenant in the 16th Regiment of the New York National Guard and did garrison duty in Fort Richmond during the American Civil War. He was Trustee and Overseer of the Poor in Brookhaven from 1866 to 1869 and Collector from 1869 to 1870. In 1882, he was elected to the New York State Assembly as a Democrat, representing Suffolk County. He was elected over Republican Simeon S. Hawkins. He served in the Assembly in 1883. In the Assembly, he had several laws passed to favor progressing the oyster raising industry. He refused a nomination for a second term and later became Town Supervisor. A stalwart Democrat, he regularly served as a delegate to the state and county conventions. He was long in favor of officially incorporating Patchogue, and lent his influence when it happened in 1892.

Bailey was a member and vestryman of St. Paul's Episcopal Church. He was a member of the Odd Fellows, the Freemasons, the Royal Arch Masonry, the Grand Army of the Republic, the Royal Arcanum, the Knights Templar, and the Kismet Shrine. He held official positions with the Masons and Odd Fellows. In 1855, he married Mary Karnon, an Irish Catholic immigrant from County Monaghan. Their children were Joseph, Emma (wife of New York Cotton Exchange employee William Wendler), Edwin Jr., Daniel (who died when he was 28), Anna (who died when she was 10), Alice (who died when she was 5), Bertha, Robert, Grace, Martha (wife of Rev. John C. Stevenson, rector of St. Peter's Protestant Episcopal Church at Bay Shore), Edwin Jr. (a member of the New York State Senate), and Mary (wife of Assemblyman Willis A. Reeve).

Bailey died at home from pneumonia on January 11, 1908. His funeral was held in the Congregational Church instead of St. Paul's Episcopal Church since it was to accommodate the mourners 1,500 people attended the funeral service in the church, hundreds more weren't able to get in the church and 400 people (representatives of local organizations he was a part of) were part of the funeral procession, making it the largest funeral held in Suffolk County until that point. State Treasurer Julius Hauser was among the attendees. The Rev. Jacob Probst of the Episcopal Church officiated the funeral. He was buried in a brick vault in the family plot in Cedar Grove Cemetery.

New York State Assembly
Preceded by George M. Fletcher	New York State Assembly; Suffolk County; 1883	Succeeded by Simeon S. Hawkins
