= Everett A. Carpenter =

American politician (1835–1899)

Member of the New York State Assembly
- In office January 1, 1880 – December 31, 1881
- Preceded by: George F. Carman
- Succeeded by: George M. Fletcher

Personal details
- Born: Everett Augustus Carpenter; July 6, 1835 Seekonk, Massachusetts, U.S.
- Died: August 5, 1899 (aged 64)
- Resting place: Oakland Cemetery, Sag Harbor, New York, U.S.
- Party: Republican
- Children: 2
- Parent: Benoni Carpenter (father)
- Education: Brown University
- Occupation: Politician, lawyer, educator

Everett Augustus Carpenter (July 6, 1835 – August 5, 1899) was an American lawyer and politician.

== Life ==
Carpenter was born on July 6, 1835, in Seekonk, Massachusetts. His father, Benoni Carpenter, was a Rhode Island Senator, Army Surgeon, and Rhode Island State Prison Superintendent.

Carpenter attended Brown University. He graduated from there in 1854, part of the last class taught by Francis Wayland. He then became a teacher, simultaneously studying law. When he reached the age of majority, he was admitted to the bar. At some point, he moved to Sag Harbor, New York, and practiced law there. He served as Assistant United States Assessor for Suffolk County, Chairman of the Republican County Committee of Suffolk County, and President of the Board of Education. He was a member of the Stalwart faction.

In 1879, Carpenter was elected to the New York State Assembly as a Republican, representing Suffolk County. He served in the Assembly in 1880 and 1881.

Carpenter was a member of the Psi Upsilon fraternity. He was married to the daughter of Captain Barney Green of Southampton. They had two daughters, Maria Gleason and Addie.

Carpenter died at home from heart disease on August 5, 1899. He was buried in Oakland Cemetery in Sag Harbor.

New York State Assembly
Preceded by George F. Carman	New York State Assembly; Suffolk County; 1880–1881	Succeeded by George M. Fletcher
