= Carter Ledyard & Milburn =

New York City law firm

- No. of offices: 2
- No. of attorneys: 114
- Major practice areas: General practice
- Date founded: 1854
- Founder: Henry J. Scudder; James C. Carter
- Company type: LLP
- Website: clm.com

Carter Ledyard & Milburn LLP is an American law firm based in New York City. The firm was founded in 1854 by Henry Scudder and James C. Carter.

== Former partners ==
- Grenville Clark, a member of the Harvard Corporation, co-author of the book World Peace Through World Law, and nominee for Nobel Peace Prize
- William Harding Jackson, National Security Advisor (under Eisenhower) and Deputy Director of CIA (under Truman).
- President Franklin D. Roosevelt was once an associate.
- Frank Wisner, a head of Office of Strategic Services operations in southeastern Europe at the end of World War II.
- Margo Kitsy Brodie, chief judge of the United States District Court for the Eastern District of New York.
