= William Prince (horticulturist) =

American horticulturist (1766–1842)

William Prince (November 10, 1766, Flushing, Province of New York – April 9, 1842, Flushing) was an American horticulturist.

== Biography ==
He was the son of horticulturist William Prince (c.1725-1802). His father's interest in horticulture was commercial: he devoted his attention to servicing a growing market for plants rather than to scientific research of interest to botanists.

In 1793 the younger William Prince bought 80 acres (32 ha) of land and extended the nurseries of his father in Flushing, renaming them the Linnaean Botanic Garden. He brought many varieties of fruits into the United States, sent many trees and plants to Europe, and systematized the nomenclature of the best-known fruits, such as the Bartlett pear and the Isabella grape. He introduced the Isabella grape to United States viticulture, for which it was long one of the mainstays. The London Horticultural Society named the “William Prince” apple in his honor. He was a member of the horticultural societies of London and Paris, of the Imperial Society of Georgofili of Florence, and of the principal societies in the United States The meeting of horticulturists in 1823, at which De Witt Clinton delivered an address, was held at his residence.

To advertise his nursery, he published A Short Treatise on Horticulture, the first comprehensive book that was written in the United States upon this subject (New York, 1828).

== Family ==
He married Mary Stratton. Their son William Robert Prince carried on his father's work, and father and son cooperated on at least two publications.
