= Derby Academy (Hingham) =

Location
- 56 Burditt Avenue; Hingham, Massachusetts 02043; United States
- Coordinates: 42°14′54″N 70°53′38″W

Information
- School type: Private Coeducational
- Founded: 1784
- Founder: Madam Sarah Derby
- Status: Open
- Head of school: Dr. Colleen Ramsden
- Faculty: 54
- Grades: Pre-K to 8
- Age: 4+
- Enrollment: 335
- Student to teacher ratio: 6:1
- Language: English
- Campus size: 27 acres (110,000 m^{2})
- Campus type: Suburb
- Colors: Blue and White
- Slogan: Improve Both Mind & Heart
- Endowment: $11,000,000

Derby Academy is a private elementary and middle school that offers a coeducational curriculum to Pre-Kindergarten through 8th grade. It is located near Route 3A and Broad Cove in Hingham, Massachusetts. The grades are divided into the Primary/Lower School (Pre-Kindergarten – Grade 3), Middle School (Grades 4–5), and Upper School (Grades 6–8).

== Campus ==
The campus consists of 27 acres (110,000 m^{2}) of playing fields and academic buildings.

== History ==
Derby Academy was founded in 1784 by Sarah Langley Hersey Derby, widow of wealthy Salem merchant Richard Derby. It claims to be the oldest coeducational institution in the United States. Here young women learned English, French and needlework, while male students had a classical education: mathematics, geography, Greek and Latin. In 1818 the original structure was replaced with what is now called Old Derby Academy, located on Main Street in Hingham, Massachusetts. The school moved in the 1960s to its current location on Burditt Avenue.

Today, Derby serves students in Pre-Kindergarten through Grade 8, offering rigorous academics and rich arts and athletics for everyone. Some of Derby's more prestigious programs include the International Primary Curriculum for Grades 1–5, foreign language offerings beginning in Pre-Kindergarten, and laboratory science starting in Grade 4. Derby remains committed to the arts in every grade at school. Upper School students have a wider range of course offerings, including visual arts, applied and digital arts, music, dance and theater. Physical education begins in Pre-Kindergarten, and team sports begin in Grade 6. The Derby experience includes programs such as Outdoor Education, cross-grade mentoring, clubs and more.
