= Linnaean Botanic Garden =

Former botanical garden in New York City

Coordinates: 40°45′54″N 73°50′00″W

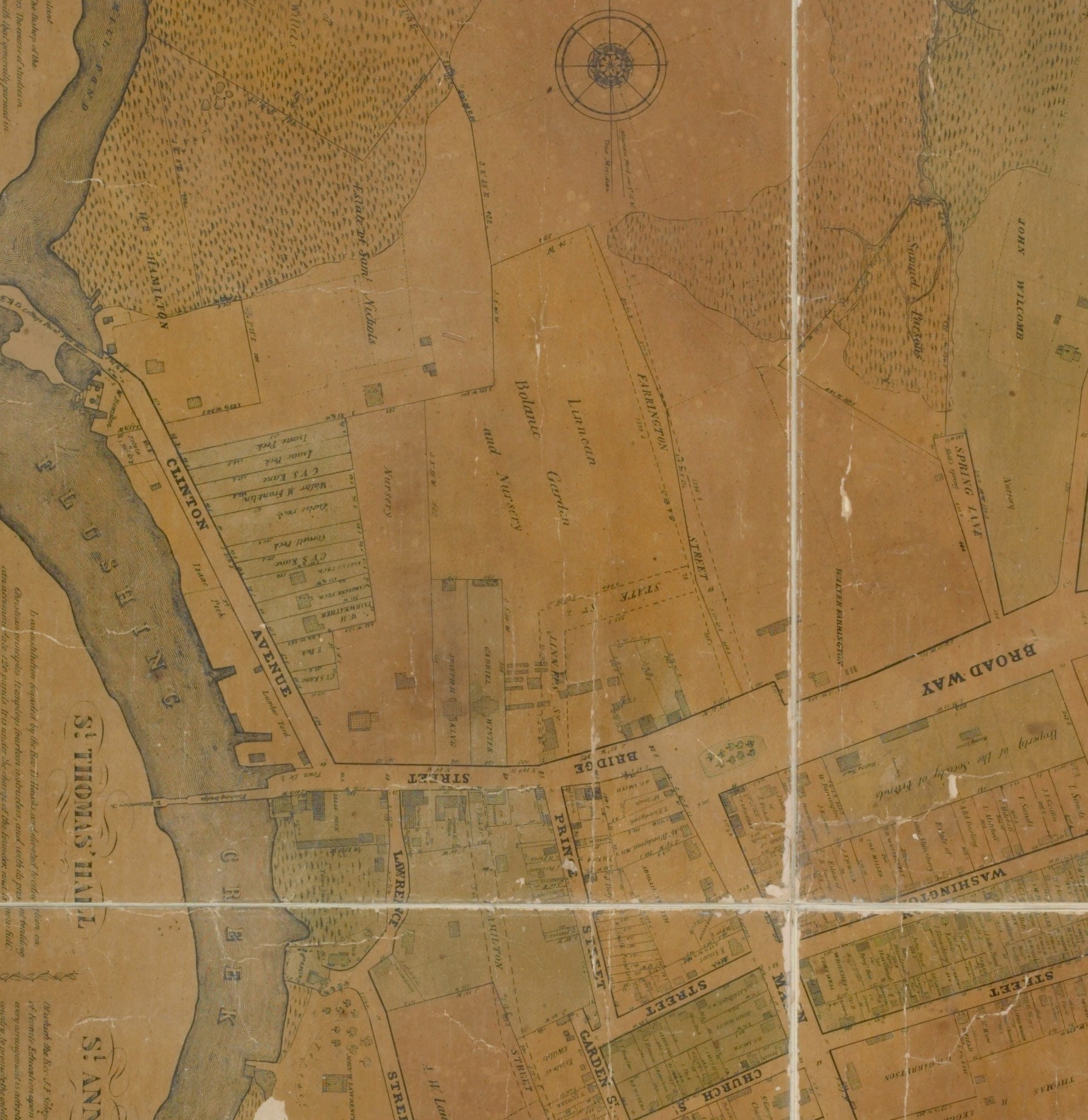
- Excerpt of 1841 map of Flushing showing "Linnaean Botanic Garden and Nursery" lying north of Bridge Street (today's Northern Boulevard)
- Location: Flushing, Queens
- Established: 1730s

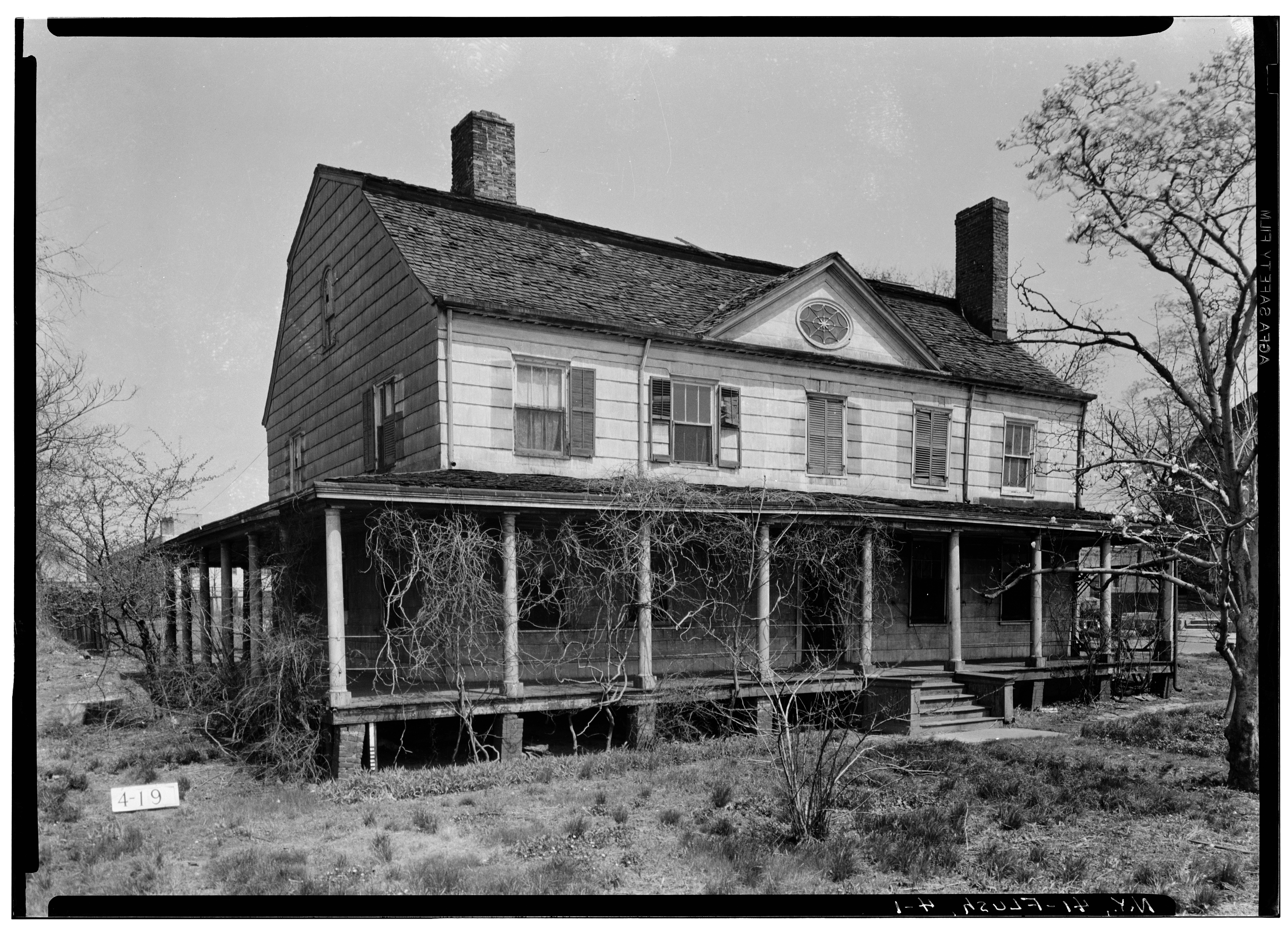
Prince home (bought by family around 1800) before being razed in the late 1930s.

The Linnaean Botanic Garden or Prince's Nursery was a nursery and gardens in Flushing, Queens, New York (now part of New York City), started in the mid-18th century by the Prince family. The establishment was one of the first commercial nurseries in the country, and was in operation about 130 years until the property was sold after 1869.

== History ==
Robert Prince and his son William started the Prince family nursery in the 1730s (with 1737 an often cited date) on eight acres. It soon was the biggest provider of fruit trees and grapes in the colonies. This first William Prince was the first to cultivate pecan trees for sale, starting in 1772.

An advertisement running on September 21, 1767 stated:

For sale at William Prince's nursery, Flushing, a great variety of fruit trees, such as apple, plum, peach, nectarine, cherry, apricot and pear. They may be put up so as to be sent to Europe. Capt. Jeremiah Mitchell and Daniel Clements go to New York in packet boats Tuesdays and Fridays

Though Long Island came under British rule during the American Revolutionary War, the British protected it due to the value of the operation.

Around 1793, William Prince (grandson of Robert and son of William) added to the family acreage and renamed this tract as the Linnaean Botanic Garden and Nursery, named after Carolus Linnaeus, who formalised binomial nomenclature, the modern system of naming organisms. This William's brother, Benjamin, called the original family nursery plot "The Old American Nursery."

The second William's son William Robert Prince was the fourth and last Prince generation to run the gardens. When he died in 1869 the nursery shut down, though many of their unusual plants lived much longer.

The first four Presidents of the United States all visited the establishment. George Washington first visited the nursery in October 1789 with John Adams, when the United States capital was still in New York City. Washington wasn't impressed on his first visit, but his opinion bettered over time. Thomas Jefferson and James Madison visited in 1791, with Jefferson placing a large order for his home at Monticello.

Prince Street in Flushing is named for the Prince family; the gardens were in the vicinity of that street and Broadway/Bridge Street (now Northern Boulevard).
