= James W. Covert =

American politician (1842–1910)

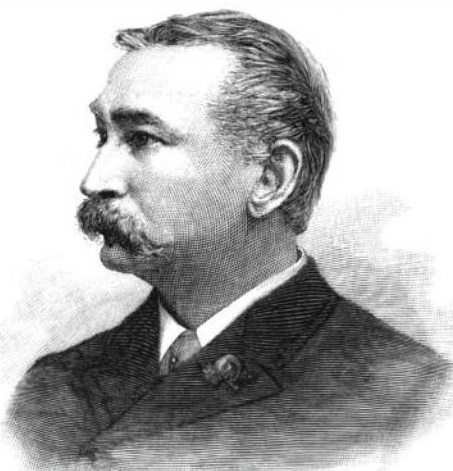

Chairman of the House Committee on Patents
- In office 1893–1895

Chairman of the House Committee on Agriculture
- In office 1879–1881

Member of the U.S. House of Representatives from New York's 1st district
- In office March 4, 1889 – March 3, 1895
- Preceded by: Perry Belmont
- Succeeded by: Richard C. McCormick
- In office March 4, 1877 – March 3, 1881
- Preceded by: Henry B. Metcalfe
- Succeeded by: Perry Belmont

Member of the New York State Senate from the 1st district
- In office January 1, 1882 – December 31, 1883
- Preceded by: John Birdsall
- Succeeded by: James Otis

Personal details
- Born: September 2, 1842 Oyster Bay, New York, US
- Died: May 16, 1910 (aged 67) Brooklyn, New York, US
- Party: Democratic
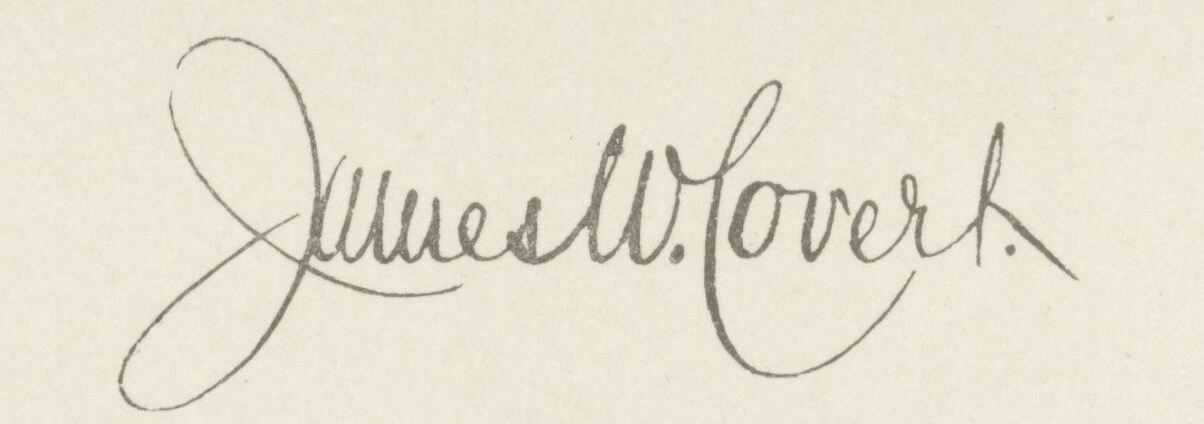
- Signature

James Way Covert (September 2, 1842 – May 16, 1910) was an American lawyer and politician who served five terms as a United States representative from New York from 1877 to 1881, and from 1889 to 1895

== Biography ==
Born at Oyster Bay, he attended the public schools and received an academic education in Locust Valley. He studied law, was admitted to the bar in 1863, and commenced practice in Flushing. He was district school commissioner from 1867 to 1870, assistant prosecuting attorney of Queens County, and Surrogate of Queens County from 1870 to 1874.

=== Tenures in Congress ===
Covert was elected as a Democrat to the 45th and 46th United States Congresses, holding office from March 4, 1877, to March 3, 1881. He was Chairman of the House Committee on Agriculture (46th Congress). He was a member of the New York State Senate (1st D.) in 1882 and 1883.

He was elected to the 51st, 52nd and 53rd United States Congresses, holding office from March 4, 1889, to March 3, 1895. He was Chairman of the House Committee on Patents (53rd Congress).

=== Later career and death ===
Covert moved to Brooklyn in 1896 and resumed the practice of law. He died in Brooklyn in 1910; interment was in Mount Olivet Cemetery in Maspeth.

U.S. House of Representatives
| Preceded by Henry B. Metcalfe | Member of the U.S. House of Representatives from New York's 1st congressional district 1877–1881 | Succeeded by Perry Belmont |
| Preceded by Perry Belmont | Member of the U.S. House of Representatives from New York's 1st congressional district 1889–1895 | Succeeded by Richard C. McCormick |
New York State Senate
| Preceded by John Birdsall | New York State Senate; 1st District; 1882–1883 | Succeeded by James Otis |
