= Isaac Coles (New York politician) =

American politician from New York

Member of the New York State Assembly from Queens County's 1st District
- In office 1862–1862
- Preceded by: Stephen Taber
- Succeeded by: Charles T. Duryea

Isaac Coles was an American politician from New York. He served as a member of the New York State Assembly in 1862, representing Queens County's 1st District.

== Political career ==
Coles was elected to the New York State Assembly and served in the 1862 session, representing Queens County's 1st District. During the session, he introduced a bill to amend the game laws of Suffolk and Queens counties.

New York State Assembly
Preceded by Stephen Taber	New York State Assembly; Queens County, 1st District; 1862	Succeeded by Charles T. Duryea
