= John Birdsall (politician, born 1840) =

American politician

Member of the New York State Senate from the 1st district
- In office 1880–1881
- Preceded by: James M. Oakley
- Succeeded by: James W. Covert

Personal details
- Born: October 5, 1840 Flatbush, Brooklyn, New York
- Died: April 14, 1891 (aged 50) New York, New York
- Party: Republican
- Spouse: Annie Frost
- Occupation: Lawyer, merchant, and farmer

John Birdsall (October 5, 1840 – April 15, 1891) was an American merchant, Union Army officer, lawyer and politician from New York.

== Life ==
He was born on October 5, 1840, in Flatbush, Kings County, New York. He attended the grammar school in Brooklyn, and then engaged in mercantile pursuits, and later in farming. He had a law office at 39 Nassau Street in New York City, and lived at Glen Cove.

During the American Civil War he became a major of the 13th New York Cavalry, and after the war was commissioned as a captain of cavalry in the U.S. Army.

He was a member of the New York State Senate (1st D.) in 1880 and 1881.

Apparently due to financial troubles, he killed himself April 15, 1891, by inhaling natural gas, lying fully dressed on the bed in a room at the United States Hotel, on the corner of Pearl and Fulton streets, in Manhattan.

== Sources ==
New York State Senate
| Preceded by James M. Oakley | New York State Senate; 1st District; 1880–1881 | Succeeded by James W. Covert |
