= Kismet Temple =

- U.S. National Register of Historic Places
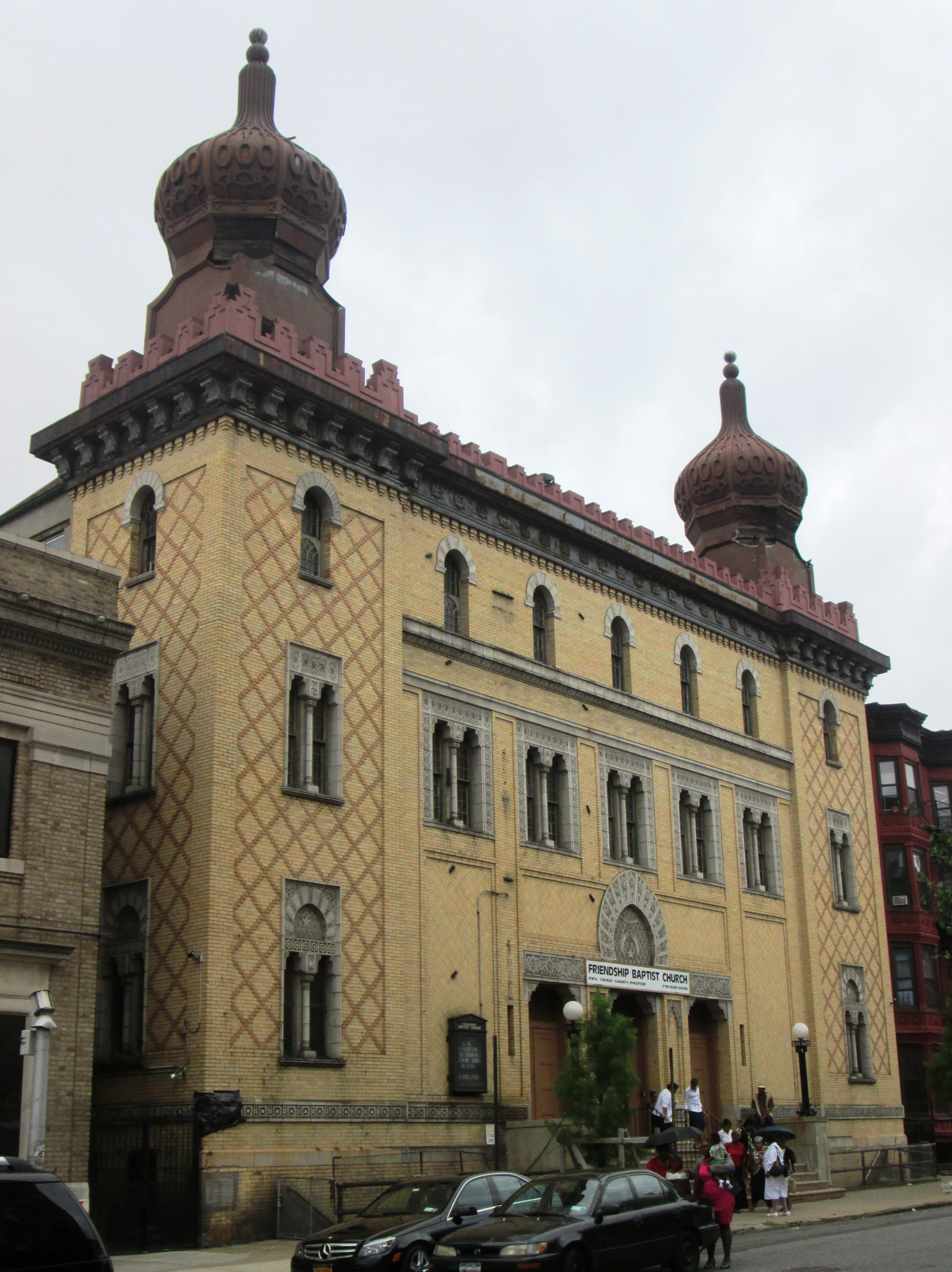
- Friendship Baptist Church, July 2013

- Location within New York City Location within New York Location within the United States
- Location: 92 Herkimer St., Brooklyn, New York
- Coordinates: 40°40′46.6″N 73°57′00.9″W
- Area: Less than 1.0 acre (0.40 ha)
- Built: 1909-1910
- Built by: Clark & Stowe
- Architect: Short, R. Thomas
- Architectural style: Moorish Revival
- NRHP reference No.: 13000909
- Added to NRHP: December 11, 2013

Kismet Temple, also known as the Kismet Mosque and Friendship Baptist Church, is a historic meeting hall located in the Bedford–Stuyvesant neighborhood of Brooklyn, Kings County, New York. It was built in 1909–1910 as the "Kismet Temple" of the Ancient Arabic Order of the Mystic Shrine, commonly referred to as "Shriners". It was designed by R. Thomas Short in the Eclectic Moorish Revival style. Its front facade is constructed of yellow brick and limestone-like glazed terra cotta trim with elaborate Moorish decoration. The building was sold to Friendship Baptist Church in 1966. It is thought to be the oldest Shriners mosque still intact.

It was listed on the National Register of Historic Places in 2013.
