= Lawrence (surname) =

Lawrence is an English, Scottish and Irish surname. It is derived from the Middle English or Old French given name Laurence, itself derived from Latin Laurentius. The Oxford Dictionary of Family Names of Britain lists Laurence and McLaren as variants.

Laurentius, a Latin given name which means "from Laurentium", derives from the word laurel, a Roman symbol of victory.

== Notable people ==
=== A–D ===
- Abbott Lawrence (1792–1855), a noted merchant and founder of Lawrence, Massachusetts
- Abraham Riker Lawrence (1832–1917), New York Supreme Court Justice
- Allan Lawrence (politician) (1925–2008), Ontario provincial MPP and federal MP
- Alonzo Lawrence (born 1989), American football player
- Amos Adams Lawrence (1814–1886), abolitionist and founder of the University of Kansas
- Amos Lawrence (1786–1852), Massachusetts philanthropist and politician
- Andrew Lawrence (disambiguation)
- Andria Lawrence (1936–2025), British actress
- Anya Lawrence (born 2004), British actress
- Bert Lawrence (1923–2007), Ontario provincial MPP
- Bill Lawrence (TV producer), American screenwriter and the creator of Scrubs
- Brenton Lawrence (born 1984), Australian Rugby League player
- Brian Lawrence (born 1976), American baseball pitcher
- Bruno Lawrence (1941–1995), New Zealand actor and musician
- Carmen Lawrence (born 1948), Australian politician
- Carol Lawrence (born 1932), American actress most often associated with musical theatre
- Carolyn Lawrence (born 1967), American voice actress
- Casey Lawrence (born 1987), American baseball pitcher
- Charles Lawrence (British Army officer) (1709–1760), British military officer and later governor of Nova Scotia
- Chris Lawrence (rugby league) (born 1988), Australian Rugby League player
- Christopher Lawrence (disambiguation)
- Claudia Lawrence, disappeared in York, England in 2009
- Cornelius Van Wyck Lawrence (1791–1861), Mayor of New York City, and US Congressman
- Curly Lawrence (1883–1967), British model engineer
- Cyril Lawrence (1920–2020), English footballer
- D. H. Lawrence (1885–1930), English author
- Davey Lawrence (born 1985), English ice hockey goaltender
- David Lawrence (disambiguation)
- Debbi Lawrence (born 1961), American racewalker
- Derek Lawrence, English record producer
- Dexter Lawrence (born 1997), American football player
- Don Lawrence (1928–2003), British comic book artist
- Dorothy Bell Lawrence (1911–1973), New York assemblywoman
- Doug Lawrence (disambiguation)
- Dougie Lawrence (1929–2000), Scottish cricketer
- Douglas Lawrence (born 1943), Australian organist, conductor, and choir director

=== E–J ===
- Edith Lawrence (1890–1973), British artist
- Edward A. Lawrence (1831–1883), New York politician
- Effingham Lawrence (1820–1878), US Congressman from Louisiana
- Ellis F. Lawrence, architect and founder of the School of Architecture and Allied Arts at the University of Oregon
- Ernest Lawrence (1901–1958), Nobel Prize-winning physicist: best known for inventing the cyclotron, his work in the Manhattan Project, and founding Lawrence Berkeley National Laboratory and Lawrence Livermore National Laboratory
- Eugene Lawrence (born 1986), American basketball player
- Emilio Lawrence (born 2005), Scottish footballer
- Esther Lawrence (1862–1944), American educationist and school principal
- Fenda Lawrence, 18th-century slave trader
- Florence Lawrence (1886–1938), inventor and silent film actress from Hamilton, Ontario
- Frances Lawrence (disambiguation)
- Francis Lawrence (disambiguation)
- Frederick William Lawrence (1892–1974), Canadian–American airbrush painter
- Frederick Newbold Lawrence (1834–1916), American president of the New York Stock Exchange
- Gaylon Lawrence (1934–2012), American businessman and farmer
- Geoffrey Lawrence (disambiguation)
- George Alfred Lawrence (1827–1876), English novelist
- George Newbold Lawrence (1806–1895), American businessman and amateur ornithologist
- George P. Lawrence, former U.S. Representative from Massachusetts
- George St. Patrick Lawrence (1804–1884), English soldier
- George Van Eman Lawrence (1818–1904), member of the United States House of Representatives from Pennsylvania
- Gertrude Lawrence (1898–1952), English actress and musical comedy performer
- Hal Lawrence (1920–1994), Canadian naval officer, historian and author
- Henry Lawrence (1806–1857) British soldier
- Henry Lawrence (1848–1902), English rugby union player
- Herbert Lawrence (1861–1943) British soldier
- Holly Lawrence (born 1990), British triathlete
- Iain Lawrence (born 1978), British film director and screenwriter
- Jacob Lawrence (1917–2000), American painter known for "dynamic cubism" style
- Jacqueline Lawrence (canoeist), (born 1982), Australian slalom canoeist
- James Lawrence (born 1992), English footballer
- James Lawrence (1781–1813), American naval captain and hero of the War of 1812
- Jennifer Lawrence (born 1990), American actress
- Jennifer Lawrence (Stop the Steal), political activist
- Joey Lawrence (born 1976), American comic actor
- Jodean Lawrence (1932–2010), American actress, wife of Tony Russel and mother of Del Russel
- John Hundale Lawrence, a nuclear medicine pioneer, brother of Ernest O. Lawrence
- John L. Lawrence (1785–1849), New York politician
- John Lawrence, 1st Baron Lawrence (1811–79), British statesman
- Joseph Lawrence (Pennsylvania politician) (1786–1886), member of the United States House of Representatives from Pennsylvania
- Josie Lawrence (born 1959), English actress and comedian
- Justin Lawrence (disambiguation), multiple people

=== K–S ===
- Katrina Lawrence (born 1983), Australian slalom canoeist
- Key Lawrence (born 2001), American football player
- Liam Lawrence (born 1981), English-born Irish footballer
- Liz Lawrence, English singer-songwriter and guitarist
- Malachi Lawrence (born 2003), American football player
- Margaret Morgan Lawrence (1914–2019), American psychiatrist
- Martin Lawrence (born 1965), American actor and comedian
- Mary Lawrence (actor) (1918–1991), American film and television actress and author
- Mary Lawrence (sculptor) (1868–1945), American sculptor
- Mary V. Tingley Lawrence (d. 1931), American writer, customs inspector
- Matt Lawrence (English footballer), (born 1974), English footballer
- Matthew Lawrence, (1596–1652), English puritan preacher
- Matthew Lawrence (born 1980), American actor, podcaster, and singer
- M. Larry Lawrence, United States Ambassador
- Michael Lawrence (disambiguation)
- Mike Lawrence (bridge) (born 1940), American bridge player
- Mr. Lawrence (born 1969), American actor
- Nathaniel Lawrence (1761–1797), New York politician
- Patrice Lawrence, British writer and journalist
- Peter Lawrence (disambiguation), multiple people
- Philip Lawrence (1947–1995), murdered headmaster of St. George's Roman Catholic School
- Raghava Lawrence (born 1976), Indian choreographer, actor, director and producer
- Rashard Lawrence (born 1998), American football player
- R. D. Lawrence, Canadian naturalist and writer
- Reginald Frederick Lawrence, South African entomologist
- Robert Henry Lawrence Jr. (1935–1967) the first Black American astronaut and member of the proposed Manned Orbiting Laboratory program of the U.S. Air Force
- Rosalyn Lawrence (born 1989), Australian slalom canoeist
- Sally Ward Lawrence Hunt Armstrong Downs, also known as Sallie Ward, (1827–1896), American socialite.
- Samuel Lawrence (disambiguation)
- Samuel Lawrence (congressman) (1773–1837), New York politician
- Samuel Lawrence (Canadian politician) (1879–1959), Canadian politician
- Scott Lawrence (born 1963), American film and television actor and voice of Darth Vader in Star Wars video games
- Sharon Lawrence (born 1961), American television actress
- Shomari Lawrence (born 2001), American football player
- Sihna Lawrence, member of the cabinet of Federated States of Micronesia
- Murder of Stephen Lawrence
- Steve Lawrence (born 1935), American singer, comedian, and actor
- Stringer Lawrence (1697–1775), English soldier
- Syd Lawrence, British bandleader and founder of the Syd Lawrence Orchestra big band

=== T–Z ===
- T. E. Lawrence (1888–1935), British soldier and author ("Lawrence of Arabia")
- Tayna Lawrence (born 1975), Jamaican athlete
- Thomas Lawrence (1769–1830), English portrait painter
- Thriston Lawrence (born 1996), South African golfer
- Tommy Lawrence (1940–2018), Scottish footballer
- Toni Lawrence (born 1976), convicted of criminal confinement in the torture-murder of Shanda Sharer
- Tracy Lawrence (born 1968), American country singer and musician
- Trevor Lawrence (born 1999), American football player
- Trevor Lawrence (disambiguation), several other people
- Vicki Lawrence (born 1949), American actress, singer, and comedian
- Washington H. Lawrence (1840–1900), founder of National Carbon Company
- Wendell Lawrence (born 1967), Bahamian triple jumper
- William Lawrence (disambiguation)
- William Appleton Lawrence, 3rd Bishop of the Episcopal Diocese of Western Massachusetts
- William Lawrence (biologist) (1783–1867), English surgeon and natural historian, a pre-Darwinian advocate of anthropoid origin of mankind
- William Lawrence (bishop), the 7th Bishop of the Episcopal Diocese of Massachusetts
- William Lawrence (Ohio Democrat), member of the United States House of Representatives from the 17th District of Ohio
- William Lawrence (Ohio Republican), Republican politician from Ohio
- William P. Lawrence (1930–2005), United States naval officer
- William Witherle Lawrence (1876–1936), American philologist

== Fictional characters ==
- Col. John Lawrence, main character in Merry Christmas, Mr. Lawrence (1983 film)
- Johnny Lawrence, character in the Karate Kid franchise
- Carrie and Jack Lawrence, characters in the 1997 American comedy movie Fathers' Day
- Eula Lawrence, playable character in the 2020 video game Genshin Impact
- Sammy Lawrence, Prophet of mighty Ink Demon Bendy from BATIM

== See also ==
- Laurence (disambiguation)
- Lawrance (disambiguation)
- Lawrence (given name)
- Lawrence (disambiguation)
- Laurance
- McLaren (disambiguation)
