= William Miner Lawrence =

American lawyer, judge, and historian

Member of the New York State Assembly
- In office January 1, 1891 – December 31, 1891

Personal details
- Born: September 14, 1861 New York City, U.S.
- Died: November 23, 1935 (aged 74) Jackson Heights, Queens, New York, U.S.
- Party: Democrat
- Spouse: Lavinia Oliver (m. 1891; died 1916)
- Relations: Jane Mesier Suydam (cousin); John L. Lawrence (grandfather)
- Children: 3
- Parent(s): Abraham Riker Lawrence; Eliza Williams Miner Lawrence
- Education: Columbia College

William Miner Lawrence (September 14, 1861 – November 23, 1935) was an American politician.

== Early life ==
Lawrence was born on September 14, 1861, in New York City. He was the son of Abraham Riker Lawrence (1832–1917) and Eliza Williams (née Miner) Lawrence (1838–1915). His younger sister was Ruth Woodhull Lawrence, who did not marry and who was a founder of the National Society of Colonial Dames in New York in 1893.

His paternal grandparents were Sarah Augusta (née Smith) Lawrence and John L. Lawrence, a New York State Senator, Comptroller of New York City and diplomat (who served as chargé d'Affaires at Stockholm during the absence of U.S. Minister to Sweden Jonathan Russell). Among his extended family were great-uncles, Congressmen Samuel Lawrence and William T. Lawrence, and his great-grandfather Jonathan Lawrence, a merchant and New York State Senator. He was also a direct descendant of Capt. James Lawrence, a hero of the War of 1812, and Maj. Thomas Lawrence of the British Army who received a land grant in what became Queens in 1656, Gen. Nathaniel Woodhull, and General John Tangier Smith, a U.S. Representative and U.S. Senator from New York. His maternal grandparents were Dr. William Miner and Julia Caroline (née Williams) Miner. Through his aunt, Ann Middleton (née Lawrence) Suydam, he was the first cousin of Jane Mesier Suydam.

== Career ==
After graduating from Columbia, he went into the realty business with Bryan L. Kennelly in New York. In 1890, he was elected as a Democrat to represent Manhattan in the 114th New York State Legislature, and served as a member of the New York State Assembly from January 1 to December 31, 1891.

Lawrence served as Assistant Secretary and Chief Clerk of the New York City Board of Estimate and Apportionment during the George B. McClellan Jr., William Jay Gaynor, and John Purroy Mitchel administrations until his retirement in 1924. He also served as Assistant Secretary, and then, Secretary of the New York State Board of Elections.

== Personal life ==
On December 12, 1891, Lawrence was married to Lavinia Oliver (1869–1916), a daughter of Joseph Cory Oliver and Lucretia (née Phillips) Oliver. Together, they were the parents of three children:

- Oliver Philips Lawrence (1892–1975), a U.S. Navy veteran.
- Clement Miner Lawrence (1897–1918), who died in the Bristol Channel during World War I.
- Ruth Lawrence (1902–1992), who married Stuart M. Briggs, son of G. Loring Briggs, in 1926. Ruth, who graduated from Wellesley College in 1925, was one of only five non-family members to inherit from Hetty Green, through her mentorship relationship with Green's son, Edward Howland Robinson Green.

Lawrence died of bronchial pneumonia at his home, 94-08 25th Avenue in Jackson Heights, Queens on November 23, 1935. He was buried at the Lawrence Family Cemetery, on 20th Road and 35th Avenue, in Astoria, Queens.

New York State Assembly
Preceded by William N. Hoag	New York State Assembly; New York County, 11th District; 1891	Succeeded by William N. Hoag
