= Samuel Riker =

American politician

Member of the U.S. House of Representatives from New York's 1st district
- In office March 4, 1807 – March 3, 1809
- Preceded by: Eliphalet Wickes
- Succeeded by: Ebenezer Sage
- In office November 5, 1804 – March 3, 1805
- Preceded by: John Smith
- Succeeded by: Eliphalet Wickes

Member of the New York State Assembly
- In office 1784–Unknown

Personal details
- Born: Samuel Riker; April 8, 1743 Newtown, Province of New York, British America
- Died: May 19, 1823 (aged 80) Newtown, New York, U.S.
- Party: Democratic-Republican
- Spouse: Anna Lawrence

Samuel Riker (April 8, 1743 – May 19, 1823) was an American politician and a member of the United States House of Representatives for New York's 1st congressional district from 1804 to 1805 and again from 1807 to 1809.

== Early life ==
He was born on April 8, 1743, in Newtown on Long Island in what was then the Province of New York into a family of Dutch origin. He was a son of Andrew Riker (1699–1762) and Jane (née Berrien) Riker (1703–1775).

His great-grandfather Abraham Ryker (1619–1689) was born in the Netherlands and settled in New Netherland.

== Career ==
After Riker attended the common schools, he was a member of the Newtown committee of correspondence in 1774, and was supervisor of Suffolk County in 1783. He was the lieutenant of Light Horse during the American Revolution.

Samuel Riker was a member of the New York State Assembly in 1784. He was elected as a Democratic-Republican to the Eighth Congress to fill the vacancy caused by the resignation of John Smith. He served from November 5, 1804, to March 3, 1805. He was also elected to the Tenth Congress, which met from March 4, 1807, to March 3, 1809.

== Personal life ==
Riker was married to Anna Lawrence (1749–1833). Anna was a daughter of Joseph Lawrence and a niece of merchant and New York State Senator Jonathan Lawrence. Among her cousins were Samuel, John, and William T. Lawrence. Together, they were the parents of:

- Joseph Lawrence Riker (1770–1796), a sailor who died in Jamaica.
- Andrew Riker (1771–1817)
- Richard Riker (1773–1842), the Recorder of New York City who married Jennet Phoenix, a daughter of Treasurer Daniel Phoenix (1737–1812).
- Abraham Riker (1776–1821), who married Harriet Pierson.
- Patience Riker (1778–1851), who married John Lawrence (1758–1817) in 1802.
- Samuel Riker (1780–1811), a lawyer.
- Jane Margaret Riker (1782–1868), who married merchant John Thom. After his death, she married Irish-American physician William James MacNeven.
- Anna Elvira Riker (1785–1860), who married Douwe Ditmars.
- John Lawrence Riker (1787–1861), who married Maria Smith.

He died in Newtown in Long Island on May 19, 1823. He was interred in the Dutch Reformed Cemetery.

=== Descendants ===
Through his daughter Patience, he was a grandfather of Patience Riker Lawrence (wife of Timothy Gridley Churchill) and a great-grandfather of Jane Lawrence Churchill, who married Henry Y. Satterlee, the Episcopal Bishop of Washington,

U.S. House of Representatives
| Preceded by John Smith | Member of the U.S. House of Representatives from New York's 1st congressional district 1804–1805 | Succeeded by Eliphalet Wickes |
| Preceded by Eliphalet Wickes | Member of the U.S. House of Representatives from New York's 1st congressional district 1807–1809 | Succeeded by Ebenezer Sage |
