= Mary Lawrence =

Mary Lawrence may refer to:

- Mary Lawrence (sculptor) (1868–1945), American sculptor
- Mary Lawrence (actress) (1918–1991), American actress
- Mary Wells Lawrence (1928–2024), American advertising executive
- Mary Flinn Lawrence (1877–1974), American politician, activist, and philanthropist
- Mary J. Lawrence, Caymanian politician
- Mary V. Tingley Lawrence (c. 1840–1931), American writer and customs inspector
- Carmen Lawrence (Carmen Mary Lawrence, born 1948), former Premier of Western Australia
- Mary Lawrence (1896–1975), New Zealand religious sister earlier known as the portrait artist Julia Lynch

== See also ==
- Mary Lawrance (fl. 1794–1830), British botanical illustrator
- Lawrence (surname)
