= Abraham Riker Lawrence =

American lawyer, judge, and historian

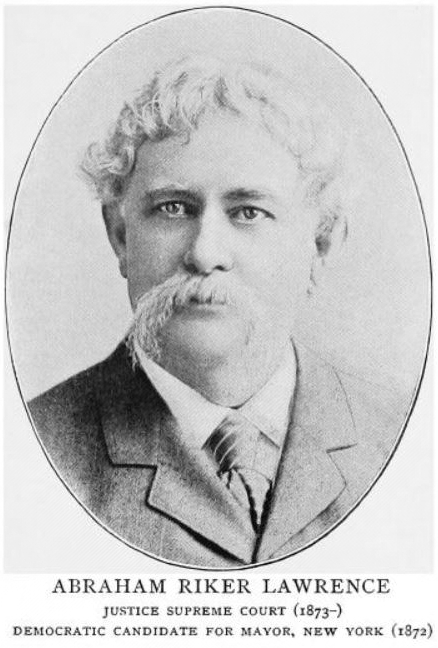

Justice of the Supreme Court of New York
- In office 1873–1901

25th President of the Saint Nicholas Society of the City of New York
- In office 1882–1883
- Preceded by: Edward Floyd DeLancey
- Succeeded by: Nathaniel Platt Bailey

Personal details
- Born: September 19, 1832 New York City, New York, U.S.
- Died: February 14, 1917 (aged 84) New York City, New York, U.S.
- Party: Democrat
- Spouse: Eliza Williams Miner (m. 1860; died 1915)
- Relations: Samuel Lawrence (uncle); William T. Lawrence (uncle); Jonathan Lawrence (grandfather)
- Parent(s): John L. Lawrence; Sarah Augusta Smith
- Education: Ballston Spa Law School

Abraham Riker Lawrence (September 19, 1832 – February 14, 1917) was an American lawyer, judge, and historian.

== Early life ==
Abraham was born in New York City on September 19, 1832 and was the namesake of his paternal uncle, Abraham Riker Lawrence, a merchant. He was one of eleven children born to John L. Lawrence (1785–1849) and Sarah Augusta Lawrence, née Smith (1794–1877). Among his siblings was Ann Middleton Suydam, née Lawrence who married John Richard Suydam, a merchant and "gentleman well-known in New-York society for his genial and hospitably qualities" (parents of Jane Mesier Suydam); Richard Montgomery Lawrence; and Charles William Lawrence.

His father was a New York State Senator, Comptroller of New York City and diplomat, who served as chargé d'Affaires at Stockholm during the absence of U.S. Minister to Sweden Jonathan Russell.

His paternal grandparents were Jonathan Lawrence, a merchant and New York State Senator, and Ruth (née Riker) Lawrence, a member of the Riker family, for whom Rikers Island is named. Among his extended family were uncles, Congressmen Samuel Lawrence and William T. Lawrence, as well as William Beach Lawrence, the Lieutenant Governor of Rhode Island, and Brigadier General Albert G. Lawrence.

He was also a direct descendant of Capt. James Lawrence, a hero of the War of 1812, and Maj. Thomas Lawrence of the British Army who received a land grant in what became Queens in 1656. His maternal grandparents were Elizabeth (née Woodhull) Smith, daughter of Gen. Nathaniel Woodhull, and General John Tangier Smith, a U.S. Representative and U.S. Senator from New York.

Lawrence was educated at private schools and then attended and graduated from Ballston Spa Law School in Ballston Spa, New York.

== Career ==
After being admitted to the bar in 1853, he was appointed and served as Assistant Corporation Counsel of New York City from 1853 to 1856 and from 1857 to 1858. In 1859, Lawrence wrote Compilation of the Tax Laws of the State of New York, with notes of Cases.

In 1867, he was a member of the Constitutional Convention. In 1870, he was one of the founders of the Association of the Bar of the City of New York, serving as vice-president in 1905 and 1906.

=== Political career ===
In 1870, he was a leading member of Apollo Hall, a Democratic reform movement founded by New York State Senator James O'Brien as a response to the corruption of Boss Tweed controlled Tammany Hall.

In 1872, Lawrence, then a lawyer doing business at 25 Nassau Street, was selected by both Tammany Hall, even though he had been a vocal opponent of Tammany, and the Greeleyites, as the Democratic candidate for mayor of New York City against the O'Brien, the Apollo candidate, and William Frederick Havemeyer, the Republican candidate. Lawrence came in second place, losing to Havemeyer, in what became Havemeyer's third non-consecutive term as mayor.

In 1873, he was elected a justice of the Supreme Court of New York. He was reelected in 1887 and served on the bench for twenty-eight years until December 31, 1901. After his retirement, a dinner was given in his honor at Delmonico's and hosted by John Edward Parsons, president of the Bar Association. From 1911 until his death, he served as the official Referee of the Supreme Court.

=== Society life ===
Lawrence was a member of the Union Club, the Century Club and the Manhattan Club. In addition to membership in the Society of Colonial Wars, serving as Chancellor in 1895, and the American Rifle Association, he served two terms as president the 25th President of the Saint Nicholas Society of the City of New York from 1882 to 1883, succeeding Edward Floyd DeLancey. He previously served as fourth vice-president in 1878, second vice-president in 1879, and first vice-president from 1880 to 1881.

== Personal life ==
In 1860, Lawrence was married to Elizabeth "Eliza" Williams Miner (1838–1915). Eliza was the only daughter of Dr. William Miner and Julia Caroline (née Williams) Miner. Together, Eliza and Abraham were the parents of:

- William Miner Lawrence (1861–1935), a member of the New York State Assembly in 1891 who married Lavinia Oliver (1869–1916).
- Ruth Woodhull Lawrence (1866–1956), who did not marry and who was a founder of the National Society of Colonial Dames in New York in 1893.

Lawrence died at his home, 69 Washington Place in New York City, on February 14, 1917. He was buried at the Lawrence Family Cemetery, on 20th Road and 35th Street, in Astoria, Queens.

=== Descendants ===
Through his son William, he was the grandfather of Oliver P. Lawrence (1892–1975), a U.S. Navy veteran, Clement Lawrence, who died young, and Ruth Lawrence (1902–1992), who married Stuart M. Briggs, son of G. Loring Briggs, in 1926. Ruth, who graduated from Wellesley College in 1925, was one of only five non-family members to inherit from Hetty Green, through her mentorship relationship with Green's son, Edward Howland Robinson Green.
