= John Smith (New York politician, born 1752) =

American politician from New York (1752–1816)

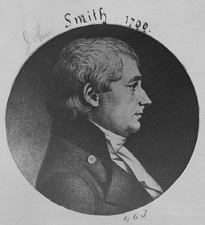

United States Senator from New York
- In office February 23, 1804 – March 4, 1813
- Preceded by: John Armstrong, Jr.
- Succeeded by: Rufus King

Member of the U.S. House of Representatives from New York's 1st district
- In office February 27, 1800 – February 23, 1804
- Preceded by: Jonathan Nicoll Havens
- Succeeded by: Samuel Riker

Personal details
- Born: February 12, 1752 Mastic Beach, Province of New York
- Died: August 12, 1816 (aged 64) Mastic Beach, New York, US
- Party: Democratic-Republican
- Spouses: Lydia Fanning (m. 1776; died 1777) Elizabeth Platt (m. 1785; died 1787) Elizabeth Woodhull Nicholl (m. 1792)
- Relations: Abraham Riker Lawrence (grandson)
- Children: 5
- Parent(s): William Smith; Mary Smith

Military service
- Branch/service: New York Militia
- Rank: Major general

John Smith (February 12, 1752 – August 12, 1816) was an American politician who served as a United States senator from New York from 1804 to 1813. He previously was the U.S. representative for New York's 1st congressional district from 1800 to 1804. He was a member of the Democratic-Republican Party.

== Early life ==
He was born on February 12, 1752, in Mastic Beach, Province of New York, then a part of British America. He was a son of New York State Senator William Smith (1720–1799) and Mary (née Smith) Smith (1735–1758). He was a great-grandson of Chief Justice William "Tangier" Smith (1655–1705).

His mother died on April 22, 1758, a week after the birth of a daughter Mary who died the next year. He lived at Manor St. George in Mastic Beach, Suffolk County, New York. In 1762, his father married Ruth Woodhull (1740–1822), a sister of Gen. Nathaniel Woodhull (1722–1776), and from that marriage John had six half-siblings.

== Career ==
He was a member of the New York State Assembly, representing Suffolk County, in 1784–85, from 1787 to 1794, and from 1798 to 1800.

He was elected to the 6th United States Congress to fill the vacancy caused by the death of Jonathan N. Havens, and took his seat on February 27, 1800. He was re-elected to the 7th and 8th United States Congresses, and served until February 23, 1804, when he took his seat in the U.S. Senate.

In February 1804, he was elected as a Democratic-Republican to the United States Senate to fill the vacancy caused by the resignation of DeWitt Clinton, replacing the temporarily appointed John Armstrong. He was re-elected in 1807, and served until March 4, 1813.

== Personal life ==
On October 16, 1776, Smith was married to Lydia Fanning (1760–1777) of Bellport, Long Island. Together, they were the parents of one son:

- William Smith (1777–1857), who married Hannah Carman (1785–1861), daughter of Samuel Carman.

Eight years after Lydia's death during childbirth in 1777, he remarried in 1785 to Elizabeth Platt (1765–1787), a daughter of Mary (née Van Wyck) Platt and Judge Zephaniah Platt, a member of the New York Provincial Congress. Among her siblings was U.S. Representative Jonas Platt and New York State Treasurer Charles Z. Platt. Elizabeth died in March 1787, just two years after their marriage.

On October 21, 1792, he married for the third time to Elizabeth (née Woodhull) Nicholl (1762–1839). Elizabeth, the widow of Henry Nicholl (a grandson of William Nicoll), was a daughter of Nathaniel Woodhull and Ruth (née Floyd) Woodhull (sister of William Floyd, a signer of the Declaration of Independence). Together, they were the parents of four children:

- Sarah Augusta Smith (1794–1877), who married New York City Comptroller John L. Lawrence, a son of merchant Jonathan Lawrence.
- Egbert Tangier Smith (1796–1879), who married Sarah Schenck, daughter of Gen. William Cortenus Schenck and sister of Gen. Robert C. Schenck, U.S. Minister to Great Britain.
- Charles Jeffrey Smith (1803–1876), who married Letitia Jane Suydam (1808–1872), a daughter of John Suydam of New York City.
- Robert Smith (d. 1862), a merchant who died unmarried.

Smith died on August 12, 1816, in Mastic on Long Island. He was interred in the family cemetery on Smiths Point, New York. His widow died on September 14, 1839.

=== Descendants ===
Through his son William, he was a grandfather of four, including: Lydia Smith (1810–1896), who married David Gelston Floyd (1802–1893) of Greenport; and Egbert Tangiers Smith (1822–1889), who married Annie Marie Robinson (daughter of Joseph Robinson).

Through his daughter Sarah, he was a grandfather of eleven, including Abraham Riker Lawrence, a Justice of the Supreme Court of New York.

U.S. House of Representatives
| Preceded by Jonathan Nicoll Havens | Member of the U.S. House of Representatives from New York's 1st congressional district 1800–1804 | Succeeded by Samuel Riker |
U.S. Senate
| Preceded by John Armstrong, Jr. | U.S. senator (Class 3) from New York; 1804–1813; Served alongside: John Armstrong, Jr., Samuel L. Mitchill, Obadiah German | Succeeded by Rufus King |
