= Jeff Lawrence =

Jeff Lawrence may refer to:

- Jeff Lawrence (unionist) (born 1952), Australian trade unionist
- Jeff Lawrence (entrepreneur) (born 1957), entrepreneur, technologist and philanthropist

== See also ==
- Geoffrey Lawrence (disambiguation)
