= Samuel Lawrence =

Samuel Lawrence may refer to:

- Samuel Lawrence (Canadian politician) (1879–1959), Canadian politician
- Samuel Lawrence (revolutionary) (1754–1827), war officer, founder of Lawrence Academy at Groton
- Samuel Lawrence (New York politician) (1773–1837), U.S. Representative from New York
- Samuel T. Lawrence (1786–1847), early associate of Joseph Smith, the founder of the Latter-day Saint movement
- Samuel Hill Lawrence (1831–1868), Irish Victoria Cross recipient
- Samuel Laurence (1812–1884), British portrait painter, also spelt as Lawrence
- Samuel C. Lawrence (1822–1911), Massachusetts politician
- Samuel Lawrence (high jumper), national standing triple jump champion, high jump and standing long jump winner at the 1911 USA Indoor Track and Field Championships
