= Prosper Wetmore =

American legislator and writer (1798–1876)

Prosper M. Wetmore
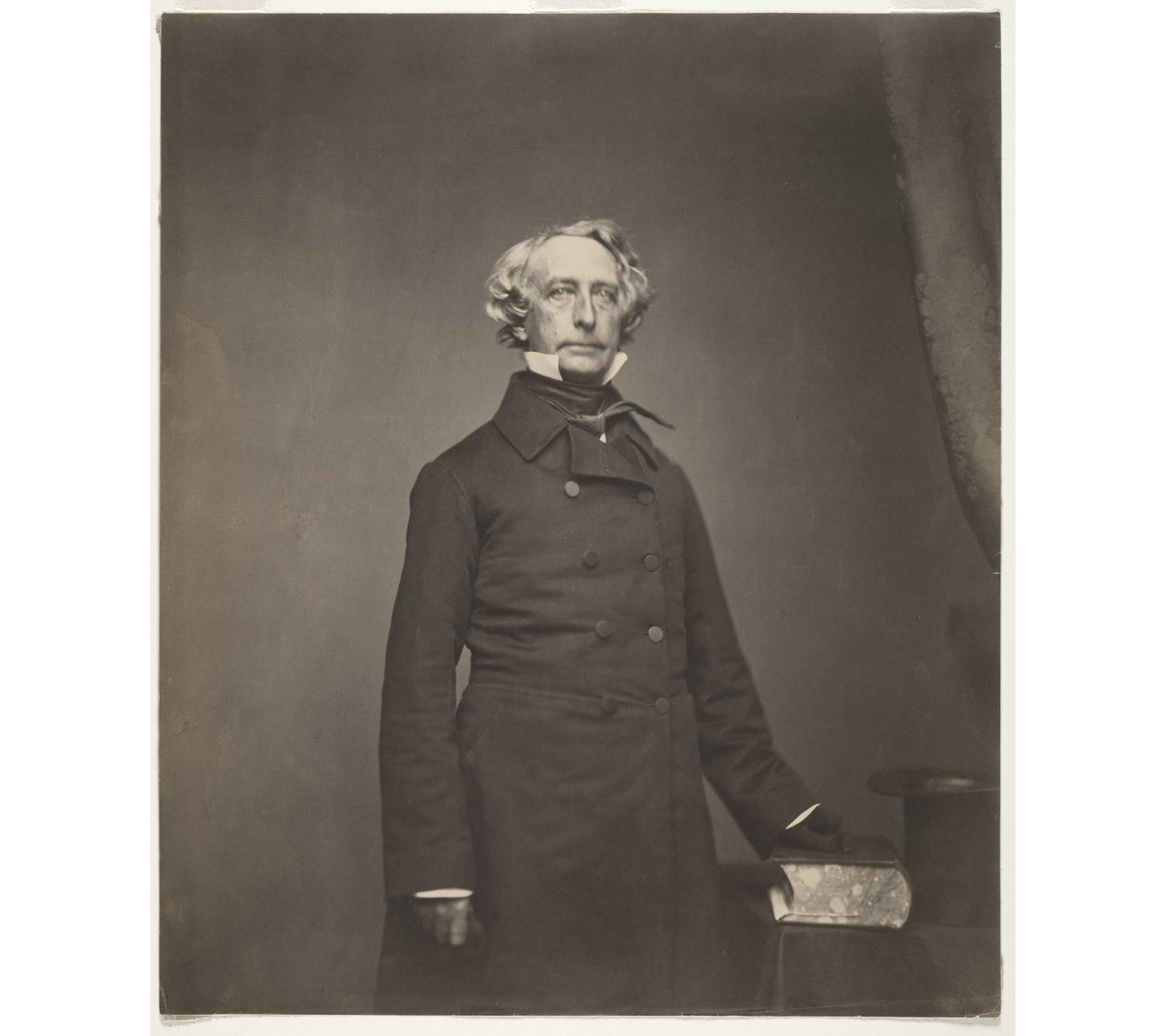
- Photograph of Wetmore, by Mathew Brady's studio, 1857
- Born: February 14, 1798; Bridgeport, Connecticut
- Died: March 16, 1876 (aged 78); Great Neck, NY
- Spouse: Lucy Ann Ogsbury
- Children: 12
- Parent(s): Robert William Wetmore; Amelia Hubbard Wetmore

Prosper Montgomery Wetmore (February 14, 1798 - March 16, 1876) was a legislator, writer and general in the New York State militia.

== Early life ==
Wetmore was born in 1798, in what is now Bridgeport, Connecticut, the son of Robert William Wetmore and Amelia (née Hubbard) Wetmore. His brother was Robert C. Wetmore.

== Career ==
He was instrumental in organizing the 7th regiment of National Guards in 1825 though he was forced to resign in 1827 due to some bad business dealings which "had resulted disastrously to his interest, and very prejudicially to his character." He was subsequently appointed its paymaster general, a job he held until 1841. He served in the State of New York legislature as one of the Regents of the University of the State of New York in 1834 and 1835. When the Democrats were in charge, Prosper was a Naval Officer. When the Whigs came into power, he was compelled to give up the chair to his brother Robert who succeeded him. Through the Wetmore brothers significant political influence, Marshall Owen Roberts secured a contract for naval supplies for the Port of New York.

He was one of the founders of the American Art Union and served as its president for three years. Wetmore was Secretary of the New York Chamber of Commerce in 1843 and was credited with the discovery of the Chamber's portraits of Alexander Hamilton and Cadwallader Colden which were thought to have been lost in New York's Great Fire in 1835. He also served as director for the New York Institution for the Instruction of the Deaf and Dumb.

In 1861, he became one of the founding members of the Union Defense Committee of New York City, serving as appointed secretary to the Executive Committee during the American Civil War. He also served as the Connecticut representative to the New England Soldiers' Relief Association.

Wetmore wrote for print frequently. He authored a book of poetry, Lexington, with other fugitive poems, about the battle of Lexington, and edited and wrote the prologue to the Deaf poet James Nack's book Earl Rupert, and other tales and poems.

== Personal life ==
He was married to Lucy Ann Ogsbury (1802–1879) and they had twelve children.

- Cornelia Roxanna Wetmore (1826–1886). Who married Frantz Bulow Muller.
- Frances Lucy Wetmore (1827–1901). Who married George Tredwell, nephew of Seabury Tredwell.
- Georgiana T Wetmore (1828–1852)
- Caroline A Wetmore (1829–1852)
- Prosper Montgomery Wetmore Jr (1832–1857)
- Elizabeth Newton Wetmore (1837–1871). Who married John Drake Skidmore.
- Louisa Lawrence Wetmore (1840–1890). Who married John Jay White. Her granddaughter was the first wife of Walter Lispenard Suydam's son
- Sarah Rice Wetmore (1843–1852)
- Charles Hubbell Wetmore (1846–1916)
- Emily Montgomery Wetmore (1845–1904)
- Alice Campbell Wetmore 1847–1879
- Edward Augsburgh Wetmore (1849–1888)
