= Geoffrey Lawrence =

Geoffrey Lawrence may refer to:

- Geoffrey Lawrence, 1st Baron Oaksey (1880–1971), British judge during the Nuremberg trials
- Frederick Geoffrey Lawrence (1902–1967), British lawyer and jurist
- Geoffrey Charles Lawrence (1915–1994), Zanzibari politician
- Geoffrey Lawrence (sociologist) (born 1950), Australian academic

== See also ==
- Jeff Lawrence (disambiguation)
