= William F. Laurance =

American conservationist

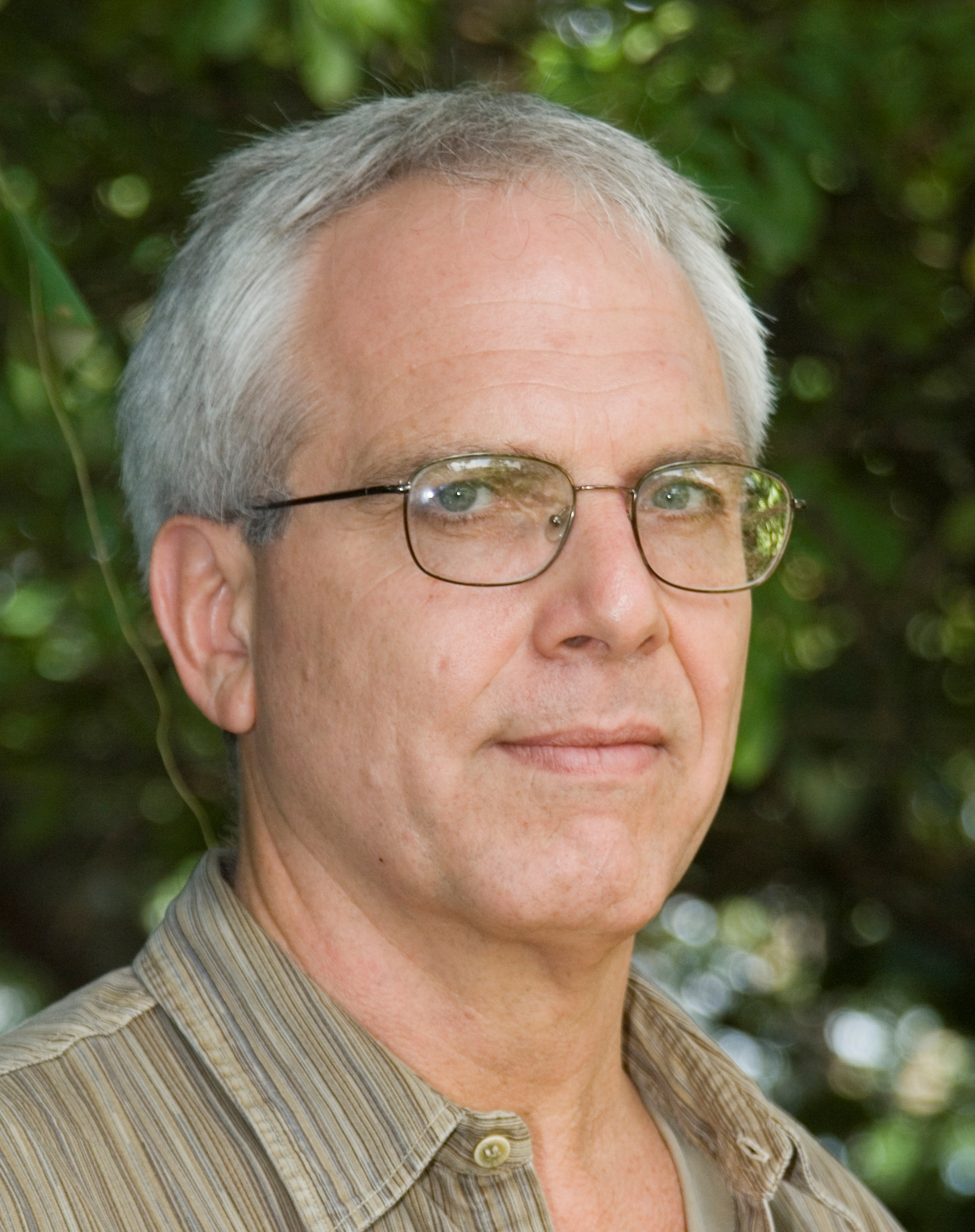
- Born: 12 October 1957 (age 69)
- Citizenship: Joint citizenship (US, Australia)
- Education: University of California, Berkeley
- Awards: Australian Laureate Fellowship; Various other academic donors
- Scientific career
- Fields: Biologist, conservationist
- Workplaces: James Cook University Smithsonian Institution

William F. Laurance (born 12 October 1957), also known as Bill Laurance, is Distinguished Research Professor at James Cook University, Australia and has been elected as a Fellow of the Australian Academy of Science, the American Association for the Advancement of Science, and the British Royal Society. He has received an Australian Laureate Fellowship from the Australian Research Council. He held the Prince Bernhard Chair for International Nature Conservation at Utrecht University, Netherlands from 2010 to 2014.

== Early life ==
William F. Laurance grew up in the western US, in Oregon and Idaho. He initially aspired to direct his own zoo, but later turned to ecology and conservation biology.

Since he was interested in nature conservation, he decided in the early 1980s to study imperiled tropical forests for his PhD. During this time, he also became involved in some heated conservation issues in Australia and elsewhere.

== Professional career ==
Laurance has published eight books and more than 800 scientific and popular articles. These include two edited volumes, as well as analyses of conservation-policy challenges in the Brazilian Amazon, Gabon, Southeast Asia, and New Guinea. He has also synthesized changing trends, new initiatives, and major debates in tropical conservation science and policy.

He is among the most highly cited scientists globally in the fields of ecology, environmental science, and evolution His works have been cited over 115,000 times, and his Hirsch's h index of 163 (as of September 2026) is the highest of any environmental scientist or ecologist in Australia and ranked number 6 globally. He has published more than 70 papers to date in Science and Nature.

He has conducted long-term research across the world's tropics, from the Amazon Basin to the Asia-Pacific region and Congo Basin.

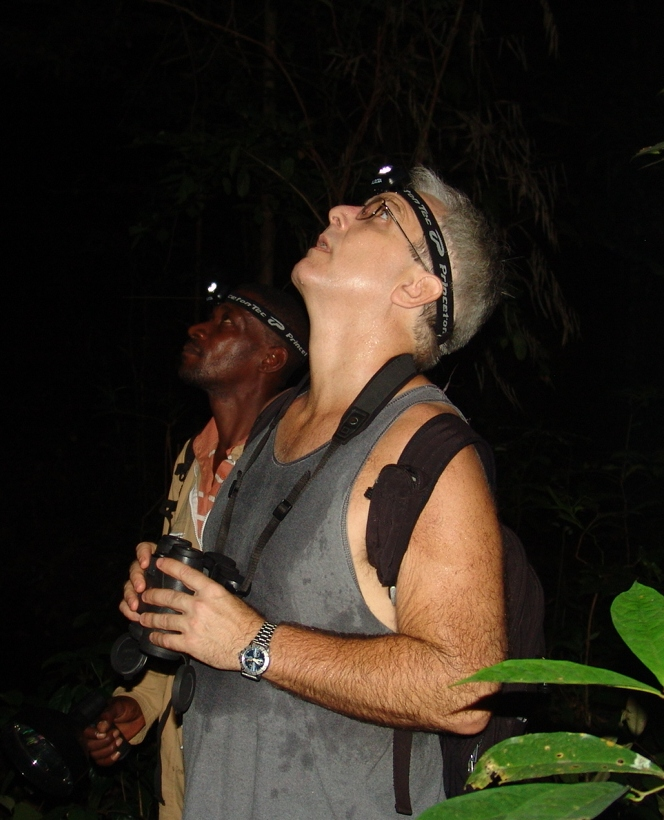
Laurance spotlighting for wildlife in the Congo Basin

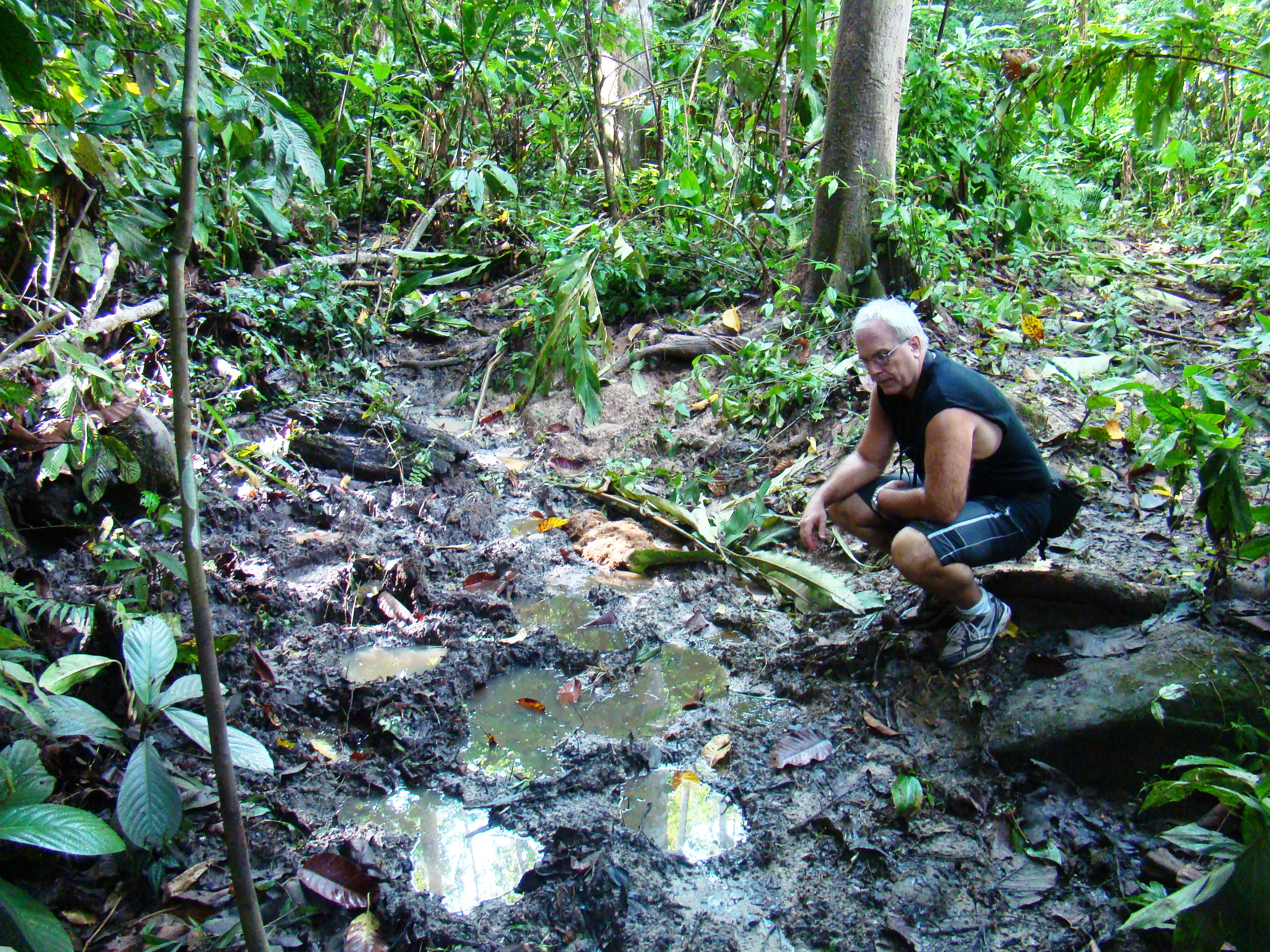
Laurance inspecting wild elephant footprints in Peninsular Malaysia

In his long-term studies of habitat fragmentation in the Amazon Basin, he introduced concepts, including "biomass collapse", the "hyperdynamism hypothesis", the "landscape-divergence hypothesis", the large spatial scale of some edge effects, the key role of matrix tolerance in determining species' responses to fragmentation, and the importance of synergisms between fragmentation and other environmental insults.

His scientific interests include assessing the impacts of deforestation, logging, hunting, wildfires, road expansion, and climatic change on tropical ecosystems and biodiversity.

Laurance has also studied the drivers of global amphibian declines; quantifying the threats to tropical protected areas; evaluating potential effects of global atmospheric changes on the species composition, dynamics; and carbon storage of intact tropical forests; and understanding how droughts affect tropical tree communities.

Laurance is also involved with the Environmental Leadership and Training Initiative, a $15 million program run by Yale University and the Smithsonian Institution to train environmental decision-makers across Latin America and Southeast Asia. Laurance also writes in popular magazines about environmental policies in the tropics.

== Awards and honours ==
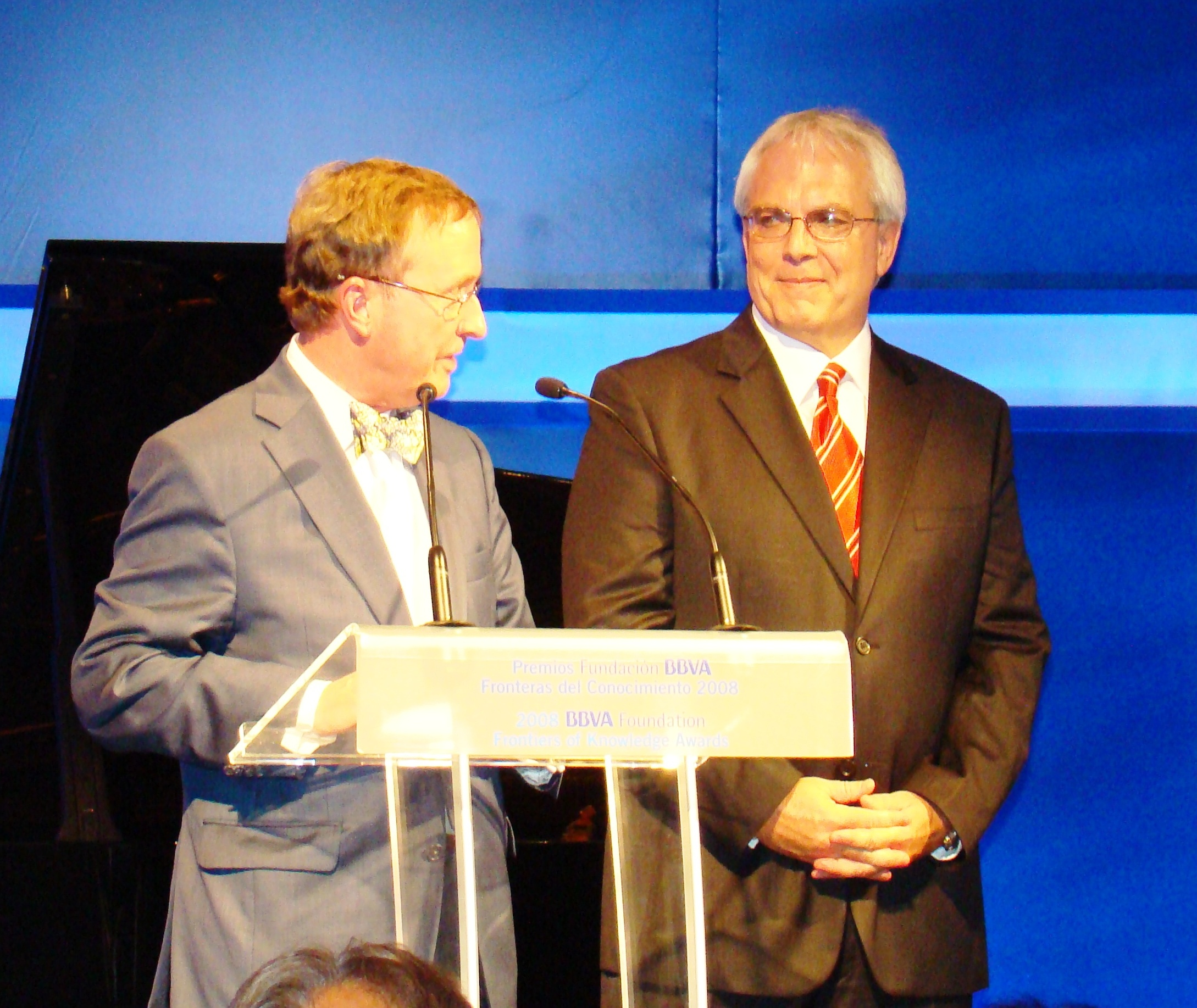
Laurance and Thomas Lovejoy accepting the BBVA Foundation Frontiers of Knowledge Award in Ecology and Environment, in Madrid, Spain in 2009.

His awards include the 2008 BBVA Foundation Frontiers of Knowledge Award in Ecology and Conservation Biology (co-winner with Thomas Lovejoy), the Heineken Environment Prize, and a Distinguished Service Award from the Society for Conservation Biology.

- Cassowary Prize for Tropical Research and Conservation, 2018
- Outstanding Contributions to Nature Conservation, Zoological Society of London, 2015.
- The Dr A.H. Heineken Prize for Environmental Sciences, Royal Netherlands Academy of Arts and Sciences and A. H. Heineken Foundation, 2012.
- Distinguished Service Award, Society for Conservation Biology, 2011.
- Six-time recipient of the Faculty of 1000 Selection for Outstanding Articles.
- Four-time winner of Australia's Best Science Writing Prize.
- Top 50-most cited papers in Biological Conservation.
- Australian Laureate Fellowship, 2010
- Distinguished Alumni Award, Boise State University, USA, 2010.
- BBVA Foundation Frontiers of Knowledge Award in Ecology and Conservation Biology Award (co-winner with Thomas Lovejoy), 2008
- Highly Cited Researcher Award, ISI Thompson Scientific, 2007, 2016, 2017, 2018, 2019
- Outstanding Paper of the Year, International Association of Landscape Ecologists, 2006

=== Fellowships and councils ===
- Elected Fellow of the Royal Society, 2025
- Elected Fellow of the Australian Academy of Science, 2015
- President-elect, President, and Past-president, Association for Tropical Biology and Conservation, 2005–2007
- Honorary Fellow of the World Innovation Foundation, 2005
- John A. Erskine Fellow, University of Canterbury, New Zealand, 2005
- Executive Council, Association for Tropical Biology and Conservation, 2004–2005
- Elected Fellow of the American Association for the Advancement of Science, 2003
- Executive Council, Australian Mammal Society, 1994–1996

== Conservation and public outreach ==
In 2013 Laurance founded ALERT—the Alliance of Leading Environmental Researchers & Thinkers. This organization, which Laurance leads, is engaged in scientific and conservation advocacy and currently reaches 1-2 million readers each week using a range of social-media platforms. Laurance has also been involved in scores of conservation initiatives via his involvement with professional scientific societies, including the Association for Tropical Biology and Conservation, Society for Conservation Biology, and American Society of Mammalogists. These include his efforts to:

- Oppose new roads and oil projects inside Ecuadorian protected areas
- Reduce illegal gold mining in the Guiana Shield of northern South America
- Slow the pace of Amazon deforestation
- Limit rapid expansion of industrial logging in Guyana
- Applaud the designation of new protected areas in Gabon
- Reduce logging and mining encroachment into the Rio Caura basin of Venezuela
- Halt illegal colonization of protected areas in central Amazonia
- Support a new national park in the imperiled Cerro Chucantí region of Panama
- Promote designation of the "Heart of Borneo" network of protected areas
- Oppose tropical deforestation for expansion of biofuel feedstocks
- Improve the environmental role of the Roundtable on Sustainable Palm Oil
- Promote international carbon emission trading for forest conservation
- Decry the rapid conversion of subtropical forests in China for rubber plantations
- Oppose clearing of threatened tropical dry forests in Mexico
- Urge China to reduce its massive trade in illegal tropical timber
- Support new legislation to halt imports of illegal timber into Australia
