= Michael Lawrence =

Michael Lawrence may refer to:

- Michael Lawrence (filmmaker), American filmmaker
- Michael Lawrence (writer) (born 1943), English children's writer
- Michael Lawrence (rugby league) (born 1990), for the Huddersfield Giants in the Super League
- Mike Lawrence (bridge) (born 1940), American bridge player and author
- Mike Lawrence (comedian) (born 1983), American comedian
- Michael S. Lawrence (born 1975), American geneticist

== See also ==
- Michael Laurence (1935–2015), Australian television scriptwriter, actor and producer
