= Apollo Hall Democracy =

Political reform movement in the United States

The Apollo Hall Democracy was a reform movement founded within the Democratic Party of New York City and New York State in the early 1870s. It emerged as a response to the corruption of Tammany Hall under Boss Tweed and sought to challenge the political machine's control over the city and state Democratic Party. The movement was named after Apollo Hall, a meeting space located at Broadway and 28th Street in Manhattan, where its founders and supporters gathered.

Despite attracting prominent reformers, including Samuel J. Tilden and Charles O'Conor, the Apollo Hall Democracy was ultimately unable to supplant Tammany Hall. It split the Democratic vote, allowing Republicans to win several elections, and fell into irrelevance by the mid-1870s after many of its members returned to the Tammany fold.

== Background and founding ==
The Apollo Hall Democracy had its roots in the growing opposition to the Tweed Ring, the corrupt political organization led by William M. "Boss" Tweed that controlled New York City government through Tammany Hall. Historian Mark D. Hirsch described the "Apollo Democracy" as being "founded in 1870 by a zealous band of reformers meeting at Apollo Hall, Broadway at 28th Street." This group became the nucleus of the Democratic Reform Committee, which was formally organized in the wake of the Tammany Hall-dominated state Democratic convention of 1871.

The movement absorbed the "Young Democracy," a reform group founded by New York State Senator James O'Brien. O'Brien, a former Tammany man who had turned against the ring, played a key role in founding the Apollo Hall Democracy. The committee also attracted prominent figures such as Oswald Ottendorfer, publisher of the New-Yorker Staats-Zeitung, and Abraham R. Lawrence, both of whom had been ejected from the 1871 state Democratic convention for their anti-Tammany views.

Other leading Democrats who initially supported the movement included Charles O'Conor, a renowned lawyer who played a key role in prosecuting the Tweed Ring, and Samuel J. Tilden, the future governor of New York and Democratic presidential nominee. William H. Wickham, who would later become mayor of New York City, served as the movement's chairman.

== Early meetings and organization ==
The Apollo Hall Democracy held numerous public meetings and conventions throughout 1871 and 1872. On October 6, 1871, the General Committee of the Reform Democracy met at Apollo Hall, with the hall "crowded to its utmost capacity." The meeting featured prominent speakers and adopted resolutions denouncing Tammany Hall.

On October 17, 1871, a "large and enthusiastic meeting" of the Democratic Reform General Committee was held at Apollo Hall, with Judge George Ticknor Curtis presiding and speeches delivered by Samuel J. Tilden and Henry L. Clinton. The meeting called for primaries to select reform candidates for the upcoming elections.

On October 20, 1871, the Democratic Reform City and County Convention met at Apollo Hall, nominating Judge Barrett for the Supreme Court, Judge Daly for the Common Pleas, and General Franz Sigel for Register. Admission was by ticket, ensuring that only delegates and friends of the reform movement were present.

A grand mass meeting and torch-light procession was held at Apollo Hall on October 26, 1871, with speeches by Samuel J. Tilden, S.G. Courtney, Abraham B. Lawrence, and Theodore E. Tomlinson.

== The 1872 split and the presidential election ==
The Apollo Hall Democracy played a significant role in the 1872 United States presidential election. The movement was deeply divided over whether to support the Liberal Republican ticket of Horace Greeley or the regular Democratic nominee, Charles O'Conor, who was running as a candidate of the "Straight-Out" Democrats.

On August 28, 1872, the Apollo Hall Democratic General Committee held a special meeting to repudiate the Baltimore nominees (Greeley and his running mate) and expressed strong support for Charles O'Conor. Among those present were Senator James O'Brien, Hon. William C. Barrett, Roswell D. Hatch, and other prominent reformers.

In August 1872, an attempt by Chairman William H. Wickham to endorse the Tammany ticket was rejected by the membership. The Executive Committee meeting at Apollo Hall considered a communication from the Tammany General Committee, but the effort to fuse was repudiated.

The division between Tammany and Apollo Hall was so severe that it led to legal disputes. On October 2, 1872, Judge Woodruff held court to hear arguments between the Tammany Hall Democracy and the Apollo Hall Democracy over the appointment of election supervisors, with the judge ruling in favor of Tammany.

Tammany Hall, under the leadership of John Kelly, formally rejected any fusion with Apollo Hall. On November 20, 1872, the Tammany Committee on Organization met and unanimously resolved not to appoint any committee or take any official action countenancing the fusion of the two organizations.

== The 1873 state convention and withdrawal ==
In 1873, the Apollo Hall Democracy attempted to assert its influence at the New York State Democratic Convention held in Utica. However, the convention was dominated by Tammany Hall, leading to a dramatic withdrawal.

The Apollo Hall delegation left the convention hall in protest, issuing a formal protest against the Tammany-controlled proceedings. The convention was forced to adjourn, and the nominations were delayed. A report from the Salt Lake Herald-Republican noted that the Apollo Hall delegation left the hall after their protest was rejected.

== Ratification meetings and local campaigns ==
Throughout 1873, the Apollo Hall Democracy continued to hold ratification meetings and campaign events. On October 19, 1873, a large and enthusiastic ratification meeting was held at Irving Hall in Brooklyn. On November 2, 1873, a grand ratification meeting was held in Glass Hall on Thirty-fourth Street to ratify nominations for Sheriff, State Senator, and other offices.

The movement also held a large meeting of delegates at Irving Hall in September 1873, where addresses and resolutions were adopted.

== Fusion attempts and internal divisions ==
Despite its initial opposition to Tammany, the Apollo Hall Democracy began to show signs of fragmentation in 1873. On June 14, 1873, a meeting of the Apollo Hall General Committee was held at Robinson's Hall on Sixteenth Street to consider fusion with Tammany. The meeting adopted resolutions in favor of fusion, signaling a shift in the movement's stance.

However, the movement's internal divisions made it difficult to maintain a unified front. The Apollo Hall Democracy was seen by some as a "coalition" with Republicans, as it often refused to unite with Tammany in support of local tickets.

== Decline and dissolution ==
The Apollo Hall Democracy was unable to permanently supplant Tammany Hall, which became reinvigorated under the leadership of John Kelly after the fall of Boss Tweed. By the mid-1870s, many frustrated members of the Apollo Hall Democracy abandoned the movement. Its former chairman, William H. Wickham, and William Collins Whitney both joined Tammany Hall, causing the Apollo Hall Democracy to fall into irrelevance.

The movement's decline was also hastened by the 1873 state convention debacle and the growing realization that the reform movement could not sustain itself against the well-entrenched Tammany machine. The split Democratic vote during the movement's existence had allowed the Republicans to win many elections in New York City during this period.

== Legacy ==
The Apollo Hall Democracy represented a significant, if ultimately unsuccessful, challenge to Tammany Hall's dominance. It demonstrated the depth of opposition to the Tweed Ring and provided a platform for reformers like Tilden and O'Conor. The movement's inability to sustain itself highlighted the difficulties of mounting a successful challenge to a well-entrenched political machine.

Many of its members, including Wickham, would later play important roles in New York politics. Wickham was elected mayor of New York City in 1874 with the support of a temporarily reformed Tammany Hall. The Apollo Hall Democracy also influenced later reform movements within the Democratic Party, serving as a precursor to the anti-Tammany coalitions that would emerge in subsequent decades.

The movement is also remembered for its role in the 1872 presidential election, where it helped to split the Democratic vote and contributed to the re-election of President Ulysses S. Grant.
