= Edward Floyd DeLancey =

American lawyer (1821–1905)

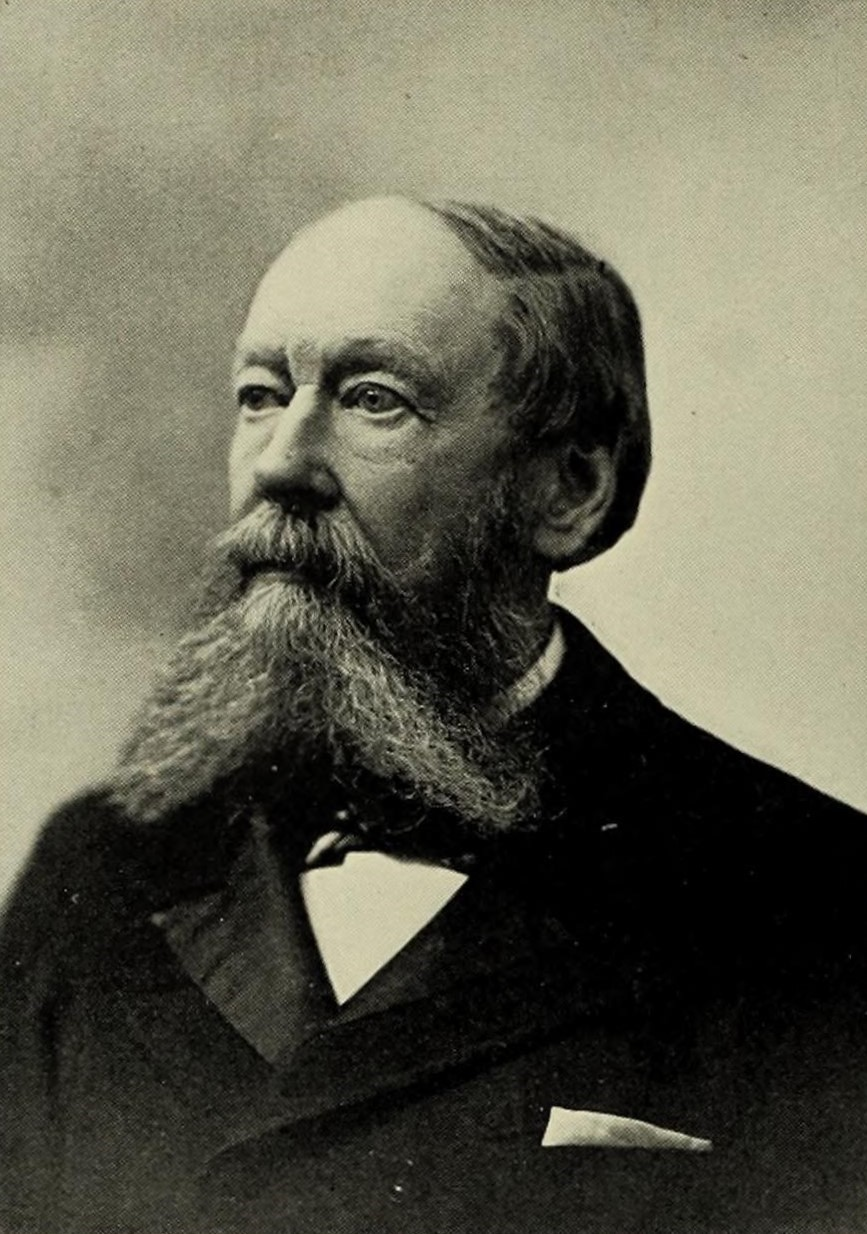

24th President of the Saint Nicholas Society of the City of New York
- In office 1880–1881
- Preceded by: Robert George Remsen
- Succeeded by: Abraham Riker Lawrence

Personal details
- Born: October 23, 1821 Mamaroneck, New York, U.S.
- Died: April 8, 1905 (aged 83) Ossining, New York, U.S.
- Spouse: Josephine Matilda De Zeng (m. 1848; died 1865)
- Parent(s): William H. DeLancey; Frances Jay Munro DeLancey
- Education: University of Pennsylvania
- Alma mater: Hobart College; Harvard Law School

Edward Floyd DeLancey (October 23, 1821 – April 8, 1905) was an American lawyer, author, and historian.

== Early life ==
"Ned" DeLancey was born on October 23, 1821, in Mamaroneck, New York. He was the eldest son of eight children born to Frances Jay (née Munro) DeLancey (1797–1869) and the Right Reverend William Heathcote DeLancey (1797–1865), the first Bishop of Western New York and sixth Provost of the University of Pennsylvania. Among his siblings was Peter Munro DeLancey and William Heathcote DeLancey Jr.

His maternal grandfather was Peter Jay Munro. His paternal grandparents were Elizabeth (née Floyd) DeLancey and John Peter DeLancey, a son of Governor James De Lancey. His grandfather was a brother to James De Lancey and a grandson of Stephen Delancey, a French Huguenot who became a successful New York merchant and married Anne Van Cortlandt, the third child of Gertrude Schuyler and Stephanus van Cortlandt, the Chief Justice of the Province of New York. Through his great-grandmother, Anne (née Heathcote) DeLancey, he was also a direct descendant of Caleb Heathcote, the 31st Mayor of New York City. His paternal aunt, Susan Augusta DeLancey, was married to the prominent author James Fenimore Cooper.

As a youth, he traveled on an extensive European tour for fourteen months with his father. DeLancey received his early education from the Rev. John Eustace and Samuel Wylie Crawford of Philadelphia. He studied at the University of Pennsylvania but transferred to Hobart College in Geneva, New York, upon his father's elevation to Bishop in 1839. He graduated from Hobart College with the class of 1843. DeLancey studied in Albany and later became graduated from Harvard Law School in 1845.

== Career ==
After being admitted to the bar in 1846, he practiced in Albany for four years until he moved to New York City and entered into a partnership with Gerard Walton Morris (son of Richard Valentine Morris) and later with George Clinton Genêt (son of Edmond-Charles Genêt and grandson of Samuel Osgood).

In 1867, he traveled abroad and stayed for more than two years, partly working in England, and also to visit Asia Minor, Northern Africa, the Holy Land.

He served as president of the New York Genealogical and Biographical Society and the 41st President of the Saint Nicholas Society of the City of New York. DeLancey was considered the head of DeLancey family as "all the other branches having become extinct in the male line."

== Personal life ==
In November 1848, DeLancey was married to Josephine Matilda DeZeng (1823–1865). Josephine was the eldest daughter of Caroline and William Steuben DeZeng. Together, they lived in New York City and were the parents of six children, including:

- Frances Munro DeLancey (1854–1867), who died aged 12.
- Edward Etienne Delancey (1859–1927), a civil engineer who married Lucia Cleveland Grannis (1872–1939), a daughter of William Heathcote Grannis, in 1890.
- Josephine DeZeng DeLancey (1863–1921).

DeLancey died on April 8, 1905, in Ossining, New York. After a funeral at Trinity Episcopal Church in Ossining, he was buried in the family burial ground at Mamaroneck by the side of his father and grandfather.

=== Descendants ===
Through his son Edward, he was the grandfather of Edwin Floyd DeLancey (b. 1893) and William Heathcote DeLancey (b. 1897).
