= Eliphalet Wickes =

American politician

Member of the U.S. House of Representatives from New York's 1st district
- In office March 4, 1805 – March 3, 1807
- Preceded by: Samuel Riker
- Succeeded by: Samuel Riker

Personal details
- Born: April 1, 1769 Huntington, Province of New York, British America
- Died: June 7, 1850 (aged 81) Troy, New York, U.S.
- Party: Democratic-Republican

Eliphalet Wickes (April 1, 1769 – June 7, 1850) was an American politician and a member of the United States House of Representatives from New York.

He was born on April 1, 1769, in Huntington on Long Island in the Province of New York. During the American Revolution, he was employed as an express rider. He studied law, was admitted to the bar, and commenced practice in Jamaica, Long Island, New York. He was elected as a Democratic-Republican to the Ninth Congress, which met from March 4, 1805, to March 3, 1807.

He was appointed the first postmaster of Jamaica, Long Island, New York on July 1, 1797, and he served until April 1, 1806. He was re-appointed on January 1, 1807, and he served until April 27, 1835. He served as District Attorney of Queens County from 1818 to 1821; he also held a judicial appointment as master in chancery. He died in Troy, New York on June 7, 1850. He was interred in Oakwood Cemetery.

U.S. House of Representatives
Preceded by Samuel Riker	Member of the U.S. House of Representatives from New York's 1st congressional district 1805–1807	Succeeded by Samuel Riker
