= Davey Lawrence =

English ice hockey player

- Born: 6 February 1985 (age 41) Barnsley, England
- Height: 6 ft 3 in (191 cm)
- Weight: 191 lb (87 kg; 13 st 9 lb)
- Position: Goaltender
- Caught: Left
- EPIHL team Former teams: Basingstoke Bison; EPIHL; Telford Tigers; EIHL; Sheffield Steelers
- Playing career: 2002–2010

Davey Lawrence (born 6 February 1985 in Barnsley, England) is an English former ice hockey goaltender who played for the Sheffield Steelers in the Elite Ice Hockey League between 2003–04 and 2007–08 seasons. During the 2008–09 Season, he played for the Telford Tigers and played for Basingstoke Bison in the English Premier Ice Hockey League for the 2009–10 season. After the 2009–10 season, Davey Lawrence retired from ice hockey after 7 successful seasons. He moved back to his hometown of Barnsley and started his own joinery and building services business.

== Early life ==
Lawrence was born to parents Janet Ives and David Lawrence in Ardsley, Barnsley. He attended Lees Hill Infant School, followed by Ardsley Oaks Junior School. Upon reaching his teenage years, he attended Darfield Foulstone High School, taking his GCSE exams. After school life, he attended Barnsley College and worked as an apprentice joiner for B.A. Haxby Barnsley LTD.

== Career ==
He signed his first professional contract aged 18 for the Sheffield Steelersin 2003 and stayed with the club until 2007–08. He also represented Great Britain U18s in Latvia at the 2003-04 world junior championships and the U20s in 2004-05 and 2005–06. At the 2004-05 world championships, they gained gold medal status, and in doing so, Davey also gained the accolade of goaltender of the tournament. After serving time with Sheffield Steelers, Davey left the club and moved south to Shropshire, where he plied his trade with the Telford Tigers. In 2009-10, he made the move towards the capital, where he enjoyed his last professional season with the newly demoted Basingstoke Bison before venturing into the business for which he now hopes to make a success.
