= John L. Lawrence =

American politician

New York City Comptroller
- In office 1849–1849
- Preceded by: Talman J. Waters
- Succeeded by: Joseph R. Taylor

Member of the New York State Senate
- In office 1848–1849
- Preceded by: New district
- Succeeded by: Clarkson Crolius

Member of the New York State Assembly
- In office 1816–1817

Personal details
- Born: October 2, 1785 New York City, U.S.
- Died: July 24, 1849 (aged 63) New York City, U.S.
- Party: Whig
- Spouse: Sarah Augusta Smith (m. 1816)
- Relations: Samuel Lawrence (brother); William T. Lawrence (brother)
- Children: 11, including Abraham
- Parent(s): Jonathan Lawrence; Ruth Riker Lawrence
- Education: Columbia College

John L. Lawrence (October 2, 1785 – July 24, 1849) was an American lawyer, diplomat, and politician from New York.

== Early life ==
John was born in New York City. He was the son of Jonathan Lawrence (1737–1812), a merchant and New York State Senator, and Ruth (née Riker) Lawrence (1746–1818), a member of the Riker family, for whom Rikers Island is named. Among his siblings were brothers Samuel Lawrence (1773–1837), a Congressmen, and William T. Lawrence (1788–1859).

He was also a direct descendant of Capt. James Lawrence, a hero of the War of 1812, and Maj. Thomas Lawrence of the British Army who received a land grant in 1656 in what became Queens.

He graduated from Columbia College in 1803. At Columbia, John L. Lawrence was a member of the Philolexian Society.

== Career ==
From June 7, 1814, to May 19, 1815, he was Chargé d'Affaires at Stockholm, representing the United States during the absence of Minister to Sweden Jonathan Russell.

He was a member of the New York State Assembly (New York Co.) in 1816–17. He was a delegate to the New York State Constitutional Convention of 1821.

He was a presidential elector in 1840, voting for William Henry Harrison and John Tyler.

He was a member of the New York State Senate (4th D.) in 1848 and 1849. In May 1849, he was appointed New York City Comptroller, but died two months later.

== Personal life ==
On June 2, 1816, he married Sarah Augusta Smith (1794–1877), daughter of Elizabeth (née Woodhull) Smith (daughter of Gen. Nathaniel Woodhull) and General John Tangier Smith, a U.S. Representative and U.S. Senator from New York. Together, John and Sarah were the parents of eleven children, including Abraham Riker Lawrence, a Justice of the Supreme Court of New York.

Lawrence died of cholera in New York City on July 24, 1849.

New York State Senate
Preceded by new district	New York State Senate; 4th District; 1848–1849	Succeeded by Clarkson Crolius
