= Andrew Lawrence =

Andrew Lawrence may refer to:

- Andrew Lawrence (actor) (born 1988), American actor
- Andrew Lawrence (basketball) (born 1990), English basketball player
- Andrew Lawrence (comedian) (born 1979), English comedian
- Andrew Lawrence (engraver) (1710–1747), English engraver
- Andrew Lawrence (astronomer), (born 1954), British astronomer

== See also ==
- Andrew Lawrence-King (born 1953), Guernsey-born musician
