= Michael S. Lawrence =

American geneticist

Michael Scott Lawrence
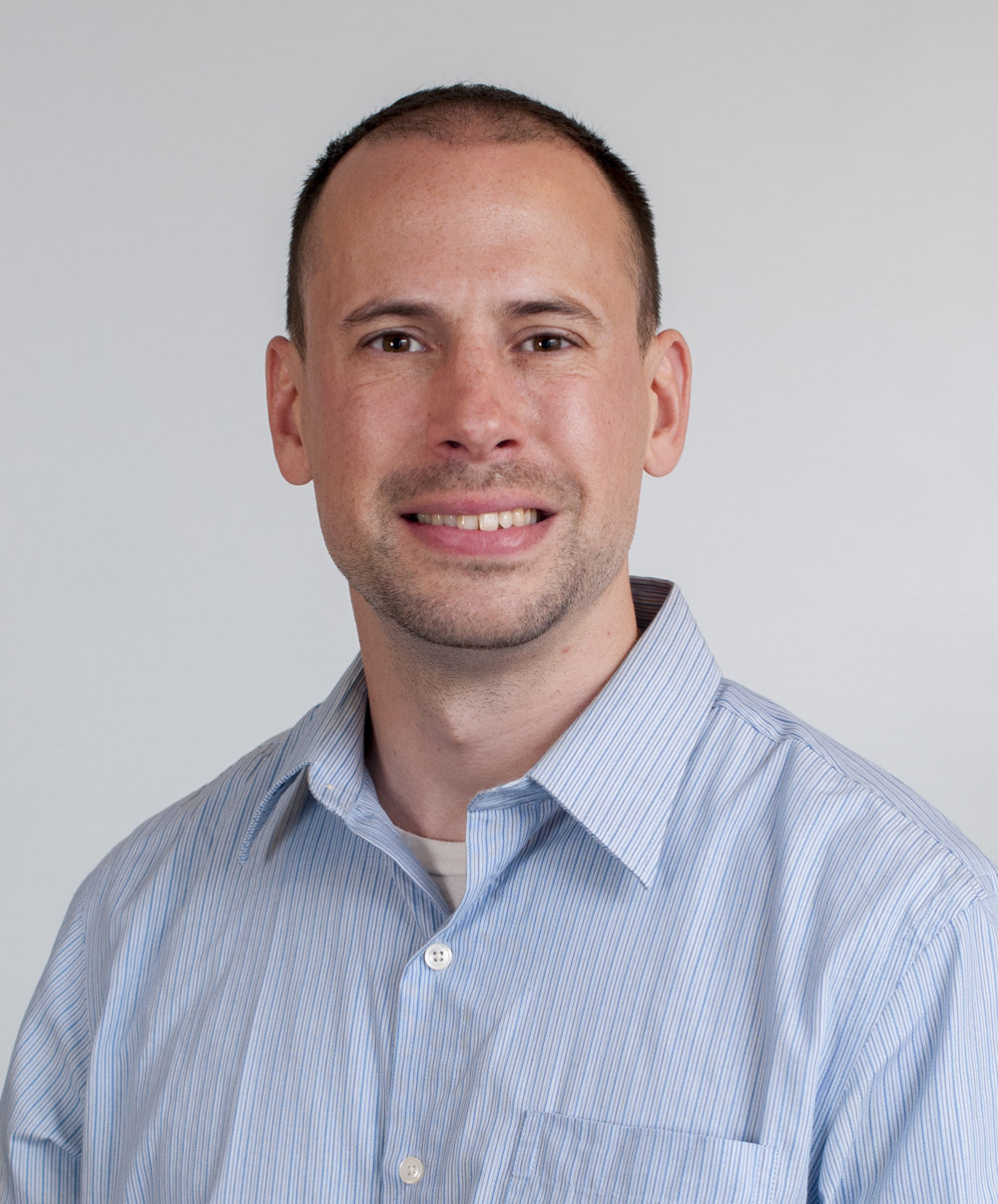
- Other name: Mike Lawrence
- Education: Brandeis University; Massachusetts Institute of Technology
- Known for: MutSig
- Scientific career
- Fields: Genetics
- Workplaces: Massachusetts General Hospital; Harvard Medical School; Broad Institute
- Thesis: RNA polymerase ribozymes (2005)
- Doctoral advisor: David Bartel

Michael Scott Lawrence is an American geneticist best known for his work on mutational signatures. Lawrence is an associate professor of pathology at the Harvard Medical School, associate geneticist at the Massachusetts General Hospital, and associate member of the Broad Institute.

== Biography ==
Lawrence earned his B.A. degree in biochemistry and linguistics from Brandeis University in 1998 and his Ph.D. degree in biology from the Massachusetts Institute of Technology in 2005, under the mentorship of David Bartel. He later received his post-doctoral training in David R. Liu's laboratory at Harvard University from 2005 to 2008. After completion of his post-doctoral training, Lawrence joined the computational genomics group of Gad Getz in the Cancer Program of the Broad Institute, where he and his colleagues developed the MutSig algorithm, which assesses the statistical significance of mutated genes by correcting for sources of mutational heterogeneity across cancer, including cancer type, mutational spectrum, gene expression, and replication timing. The development of the MutSig algorithm led to the reanalysis of major cancer genome sequencing projects, including The Cancer Genome Atlas, to remove false positives that were present in previous studies. In 2016, Lawrence joined the faulty of the pathology department at the Harvard Medical School and the Center for Cancer Research at Massachusetts General Hospital. Since 2017, Lawrence has been named Highly Cited Researcher in the field of Molecular Biology and Genetics by Clarivate.
