= Trevor Lawrence (disambiguation) =

Trevor Lawrence (born 1999) is an American football player.

Trevor Lawrence may also refer to:

- Trevor Lawrence (musician) (fl. 1962–1982), American saxophonist and producer
- Sir Trevor Lawrence, 2nd Baronet (1831–1913), English horticulturalist, art collector and politician

== See also ==
- Trevor Laurence (1952–2015), New Zealand field hockey player
