= Geoffrey Lawrence (sociologist) =

Australian sociologist and academic

Geoffrey Alan Lawrence FASSA
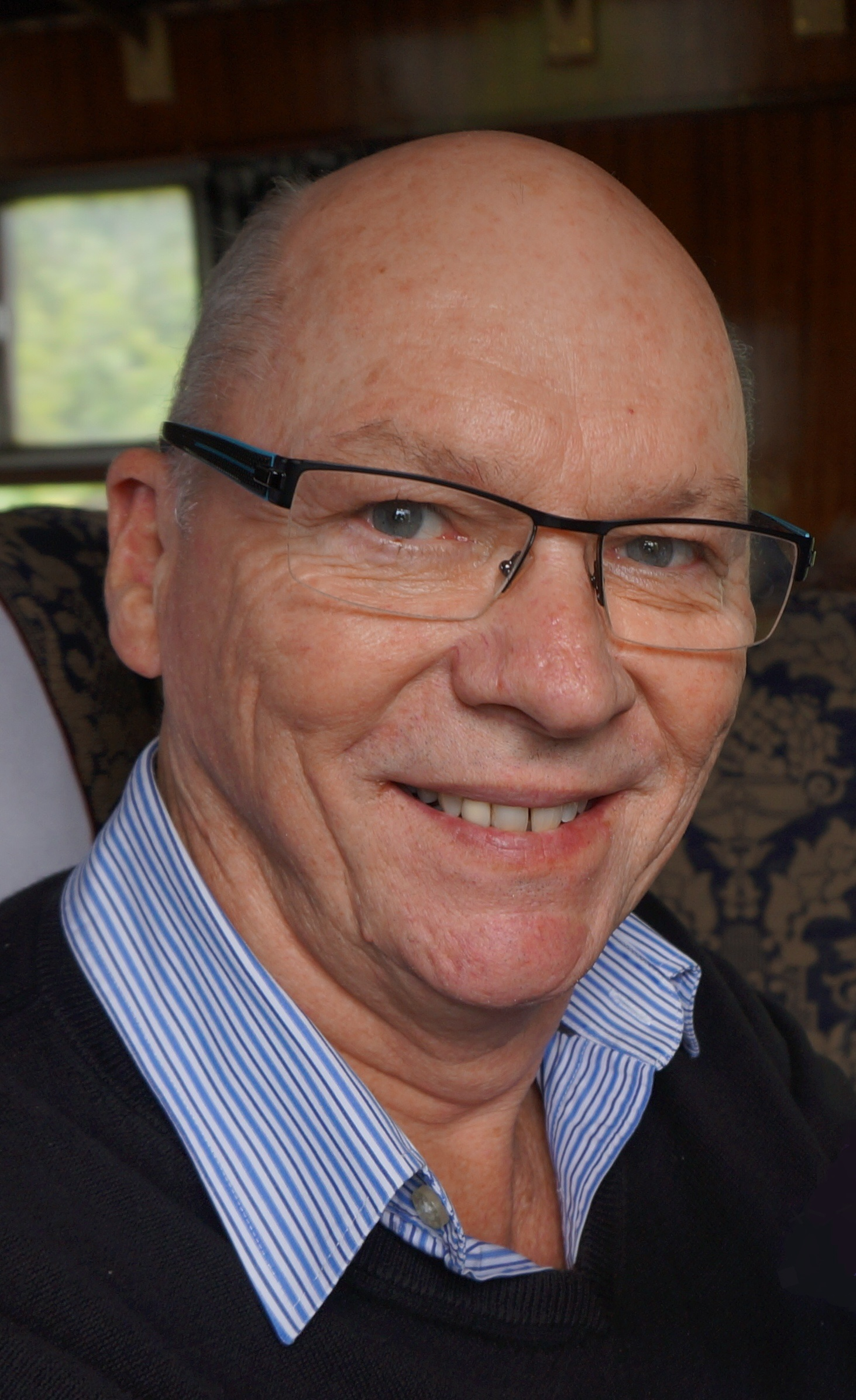
- Born: April 21, 1950 (age 76); Sydney, Australia
- Occupations: Sociologist, academic and researcher
- Known for: Sociology of agriculture and food (agri-food studies)

Academic background
- Education: BScAgr (Sydney); DipSocSci (New England); MS (Sociology) (Wisconsin-Madison); PhD (Griffith)

Geoffrey Alan Lawrence FASSA is an Australian sociologist, academic and researcher. He is Emeritus Professor of Sociology at the University of Queensland.

Lawrence's primary scholarly contributions are in the areas of agri-food studies, social aspects of the environment, natural resource management, genetic engineering, and sport and leisure. He is known for his significant contribution to rural sociology and agri-food studies.

== Education ==
Lawrence attended James Ruse Agricultural High School in Sydney from 1963 until 1968. In 1972, he graduated from the University of Sydney in Agricultural Science, majoring in Agricultural Economics. He then enrolled at the University of New England and obtained a Diploma of Social Science before moving to the United States. He attended the University of Wisconsin-Madison, receiving his master's degree in Sociology in 1978. He moved back to Australia in 1979 and earned his Doctoral degree in 1998 from Griffith University.

== Career ==
Lawrence joined the Riverina College of Advanced Education (later named Charles Sturt University) in 1973 and served as Regional Research Officer until 1977, becoming Lecturer in Sociology from 1978 until 1987. In the following year, he was promoted to Senior Lecturer, and then to Associate Professor. His book, Capitalism and the Countryside: The Rural Crisis in Australia was published in 1987 and received critical acclaim.

In 1993, Lawrence joined Central Queensland University as Foundation Professor of Sociology and later became Head of the Department of Social Sciences and Director of the Rural Social and Economic Research Centre. He established the Institute for Sustainable Regional Development in 1997, becoming its inaugural Executive Director. He was instrumental in the formation of the Fitzroy Basin Association (the catchment management authority for the Central Queensland region), and served as a member of the Management Committee from 1998 until 2002.

Lawrence moved to The University of Queensland in 2002 as Professor of Sociology and Head of the School of Social Science. He remained in the latter role for two terms, from 2002 to 2009. In the following year he became co-leader of the Global Change Institute's Food Security Focal Area, and later became Chair of the Institute's College of Experts. He retired in 2013, becoming Emeritus Professor of Sociology at The University of Queensland.

Lawrence is a former co-editor of the International Journal of Sociology of Agriculture and Food. He was the Inaugural Director of the Centre for Rural Social Research at Charles Sturt University from 1988 to 1993, and launched the journal Rural Society. In 1993 he co-founded the Australasian Agri-food Research Network, an active network of over 100 academics, students and government representatives that holds yearly conferences on rural and agri-food issues. He was a founding member of the international food-based Think Tank in 2013. He was elected President of the International Rural Sociology Association in 2012 and served in that role until 2016.

== Research ==
Lawrence has published over 400 journal articles and book chapters and some 25 books and special editions of journals. He has worked on a range of topics including the sociology of agriculture, rural restructuring, rural ideology, agribusiness, farm politics, the environment, the role of the state, rural welfare, community resilience, social impacts of agricultural biotechnologies, and globalization.

=== Agriculture and the environment ===
With colleagues, Lawrence conducted a path analysis of factors involved in the selection of organic food by Australian consumers. The study showed that concerns about the naturalness of foods was a critical factor in the decision to purchase organic foods. Barriers to the purchase of organic foods were also identified. He showed how the productivist trajectory of Australian agriculture was compromising ecological health and undermining food security, arguing that reversing environmental degradation would be a difficult task in the context of structural and attitudinal factors. He demonstrated the importance of food regime theory in understanding changing relations in agri-food supply chains. He also studied the impacts of ‘supermarketisation’ in altering patterns of food production and consumption.

=== The restructuring of regional Australia ===
Lawrence has studied the globalizing tendencies that lead to significant alterations in agricultural production, and involvement of food companies in marketing. He has written about the social transformation of rural regions, finding that a ‘dynamics of decline’ is present in many rural settings. He examined regulatory governance in Norway, Australia and the United Kingdom and highlighted changes in food governance trajectories. He also identified the impacts of neoliberal policy in increasing vulnerability of both rural communities and the food governance system.

=== Financialisation of food and farming ===
With colleagues, Lawrence has identified the important role finance plays in Australia's food and farming industries. Research has shown that financial entities such as merchant banks, sovereign wealth funds, private equity firms and hedge funds are purchasing farmlands and agribusiness firms in an effort to increase returns to shareholders. Many employ a ‘food security’ discourse to legitimate their activities. However, some of their activities have led to unintended but serious consequences, including food price distortions, land grabbing, social protest and the concentration of power in supply chains.

== Awards and honors ==
- 1968 – School Captain, James Ruse Agricultural High School
- 1969–1972 – Commonwealth University Scholarship, Sydney University
- 1972 – President, Sydney University Agricultural Society
- 1978–1979 – Australian Wool Corporation Postgraduate Research Scholarship and Travel Grant
- 1992 – Travel Grant, Australia-New Zealand Foundation
- 1997 – Distinguished Service Award, US Community Development Society
- 2002 – Life Member, Fitzroy Basin Association
- 2002 – Emeritus Professor, Central Queensland University
- 2004 – Fellow, Academy of Social Sciences in Australia
- 2009 – Most cited author, Agriculture and Human Values journal
- 2011 – ‘Living Book’ award, Brisbane IDEAS Festival
- 2013 – Most cited author, Agriculture and Human Values journal; second most cited paper, Journal of Rural Studies
- 2014 – Life Member, The Australian Sociological Association
- 2016 – Presidential Service Award, International Rural Sociology Association
- 2023 – Distinguished Service Award, Australasian Agri-food Research Network
- 2023 – Top cited article, Journal of Agrarian Change
- 2024 – Best paper (2007) selected for The Journal of Environmental Policy and Planning, Best Papers from 25 Volumes

== Bibliography ==
=== Books ===
Year	Title	Publisher
1986	Power Play: Essays in the Sociology of Australian Sport (co-edited with D. Rowe)	Hale and Iremonger, Sydney
1987	Capitalism and the Countryside: The Rural Crisis in Australia	Pluto Press, Sydney
1990	Rural Health and Welfare in Australia (co-edited with T. Cullen and P. Dunn)	Arena, Melbourne
1990	Sport and Leisure: Trends in Australian Popular Culture (co-edited with D. Rowe)	Harcourt Brace Jovanovich, Sydney
1992	Agriculture, Environment and Society: Contemporary Issues for Australia (co-edited with F. Vanclay and B. Furze)	Macmillan, Melbourne
1995	The Environmental Imperative: Eco-social Concerns for Australian Agriculture (co-authored with F. Vanclay)	CQ University Press, Rockhampton
1996	Globalization and Agri-food Restructuring: Perspectives from the Australasia Region (co-edited with D. Burch and R. Rickson)	Avebury, London
1998	Altered Genes – Reconstructing Nature: The Debate (co-edited with R. Hindmarsh and J. Norton)	Allen and Unwin, Sydney
1998	Tourism, Leisure, Sport: Critical Perspectives (co-edited with D. Rowe)	Hodder Education, Sydney
1998	Sustainable Futures: Towards a Catchment Management Strategy for the Central Queensland Region (co-edited with J. Grimes and D. Stehlik)	Institute for Sustainable Regional Development, Rockhampton
1999	Restructuring Global and Regional Agricultures: Transformations in Australasian Economies and Spaces (co-edited with D. Burch and J. Goss)	Ashgate, Aldershot
1999	Antipodean Visions: The Dynamics of Contemporary Agri-food Restructuring in Australia and New Zealand, Special Edition of Rural Sociology (co-edited with D. Burch, J. Goss and R. Rickson)	Wiley, New Jersey
2001	A Future for Regional Australia: Escaping Global Misfortune (co-authored with I. Gray)	Cambridge University Press, Cambridge
2001	Altered Genes II: The Future? (co-edited with R. Hindmarsh)	Scribe, Melbourne
2001	Globalization and Sport: Playing the World (co-authored with T. Miller, J. McKay and D. Rowe)	Sage, London
2001	Environment, Society and Natural Resource Management: Theoretical Perspectives from Australasia and the Americas (co-edited with V. Higgins and S. Lockie)	Edward Elgar, Cheltenham
2003	Globalization, Localization and Sustainable Livelihoods (co-edited with R. Almas)	Ashgate, Aldershot
2004	Recoding Nature: Critical Perspectives on Genetic Engineering (co-edited with R. Hindmarsh)	UNSW Press, Sydney
2005	Agricultural Governance: Globalization and the New Politics of Regulation (co-edited with V. Higgins)	Edward Elgar, Cheltenham
2006	Rural Governance in Australia: Changing Forms and Emerging Actors, Special Edition of Rural Society (co-edited with L. Cheshire and V. Higgins)	Taylor and Francis, Oxfordshire
2006	Going Organic: Mobilizing Networks for Environmentally Responsible Food Production (co-authored with S. Lockie, K. Lyons and D. Halpin)	CAB International, Oxfordshire
2007	Supermarkets and Agri-food Supply Chains: Transformations in the Production and Consumption of Foods (co-edited with D. Burch)	Edward Elgar, Cheltenham
2007	Rural Governance: International Perspectives (co-edited with L. Cheshire and V. Higgins)	Routledge, London
2010	Food Security, Nutrition and Sustainability (co-edited with K. Lyons and T. Wallington)	Earthscan, London
2012	THINK Sociology (co-authored with S. Baker, B. Robards, J. Scott, W. Hillman and J. Carl)	Pearson, Sydney
2012	Food Security, Special Edition of the International Journal of Sociology of Agriculture and Food (co-edited with P. McMichael)	IJSAF, Michigan
2013	From Seedling to Supermarket: Agri-food Supply Chains in Transition, Special Edition of Agriculture and Human Values (with D. Burch and J. Dixon)	Springer Nature, Switzerland
2016	Food Systems and Land (section editor) Routledge International Handbook of Rural Studies (co-edited by M. Shucksmith and D. Brown)	Routledge, London
2018	The Financialization of Agri-food Systems: Contested Transformations (co-edited with H. Bjørkhaug and A. Magnan)	Routledge, London
2024	Societal Deception: Global Social Issues in Post-Truth Times	Palgrave Macmillan, London

== Selected articles ==
- Lockie, S., Lyons, K., Lawrence, G., & Mummery, K. (2002). Eating ‘green’: motivations behind organic food consumption in Australia. Sociologia ruralis, 42(1), 23–40.
- Miller, T., Lawrence, G. A., McKay, J., & Rowe, D. (2000). Globalization and sport: Playing the world. Sage.
- Gray, I., Gray, I. W., & Lawrence, G. (2001). A future for regional Australia: Escaping global misfortune. Cambridge University Press.
- Lockie, S., Lyons, K., Lawrence, G., & Grice, J. (2004). Choosing organics: a path analysis of factors underlying the selection of organic food among Australian consumers. Appetite, 43(2), 135–146.
- Burch, D., & Lawrence, G. (2009). Towards a third food regime: behind the transformation. Agriculture and human values, 26(4), 267–279.
- Vanclay, F., & Lawrence, G. (1995). The environmental imperative: eco-social concerns for Australian agriculture.
