= Laurance =

Laurance is a surname or given name. Notable people with the name include:

== Surname ==
- John Laurance (1750–1810), American lawyer and politician from New York
- Matthew Laurance (born 1950), American actor
- William F. Laurance (born 1957), American-Australian biology professor
- Bill Laurance (born 1981), English composer, producer, and multi-instrumental musician

== Given name ==
- Laurance Doyle (born 1953), American scientist with the SETI Institute
- Laurance Rockefeller (1910–2004), American philanthropist, businessman, financier, and conservationist
- Laurance Rudic (born 1952), British theatre artist
- Laurance Safford (1893–1973), U.S. Navy cryptologist
- Laurance Browning VanMeter (born 1958), Kentucky Supreme Court Justice 2017 - present

== See also ==
- Laurence (disambiguation)
- Lawrence (disambiguation)
- Laura (disambiguation)
