= Frances Lawrence =

Frances Lawrence may refer to:

- The widow of British murder victim Philip Lawrence, who founded the Philip Lawrence Awards in his memory
- The real name of the title character in the 1960s TV series Gidget

== See also ==
- Francis Lawrence (disambiguation)
