= Dougie Lawrence =

Scottish cricketer (1929–2000)

Personal information
- Full name: Douglas Rosyth Lawrence
- Born: 20 October 1929; Portobello, Midlothian, Scotland
- Died: 8 July 2000 (aged 70); Edinburgh, Midlothian, Scotland
- Batting: Right-handed
- Bowling: Right-arm fast-medium

Domestic team information
- Years: Team
- 1956–1958: Scotland

Career statistics
Competition	First-class
Matches	7
Runs scored	32
Batting average	4.00
100s/50s	–/–
Top score	10
Balls bowled	1,072
Wickets	12
Bowling average	40.91
5 wickets in innings	–
10 wickets in match	–
Best bowling	4/56
Catches/stumpings	1/–
- Source: Cricinfo, 12 July 2022

Douglas Rosyth Lawrence (20 October 1929 — 8 July 2000) was a Scottish first-class cricketer and administrator.

Lawrence was born in October 1929 at Portobello, Midlothian. He was educated at the Royal High School, Edinburgh. A club cricketer for both Royal High School Former Pupils and Grange Cricket Club's, Lawrence made his debut for Scotland in first-class cricket against Yorkshire at Hull during Scotland's 1956 tour of England. He played first-class cricket for Scotland until 1958, making seven appearances. Playing as a right-arm fast-medium bowler, he took 12 wickets at an average of 40.91, with best figures of 4 for 56. As a tailend batsman, he scored 32 runs with a highest score of 10. Lawrence had his best seasons in club cricket as a bowler following his 40th birthday, where he replaced speed with the ability to swing the ball.

He later succeeded Neil Bowman as the president of the Scottish Cricket Union in 1990. He was additionally the president of the East of Scotland Cricket Association. Outside of cricket, he was an engineer by profession. Lawrence died at Edinburgh in July 2000.
