= Francis Lawrence (disambiguation) =

Francis Lawrence is an American music video director and film director.

Francis Lawrence may also refer to:

- Francis Lawrence of Saint Lawrence, cardinal and theologian a.k.a. Lorenzo Cozza
- Francis Leo Lawrence (1937–2013), president of Rutgers University

== See also ==
- Frances Lawrence (disambiguation)
- Francis Lawrence Jobin (1914–1995), Canadian politician
