= David Lawrence =

David Lawrence may refer to:

== Arts and entertainment ==
- David Lawrence (composer) (born 1960), American composer of television and film scores such as Descendants 3
- David H. Lawrence XVII, American television, film and voice actor
- David Lawrence, pseudonym of English poet & TV scriptwriter David Harsent (born 1942)

== Printed media ==
- D. H. Lawrence (David Herbert Richards Lawrence, 1885–1930), English novelist
- David Lawrence (publisher) (1888–1973), American publisher/editor
- David Lawrence (writer), American comic book writer
- David Lawrence Jr. (born 1942), American newspaper editor and publisher

== Sports ==
- David Lawrence (basketball) (1959–2017), American basketball player
- David Lawrence (cricketer) (1964–2025), English cricketer
- David Lawrence (skier) (1930–2003), American alpine skier

== Other uses ==
- David L. Lawrence (1889–1966), Governor of Pennsylvania and Pittsburgh mayor

== See also ==
- Chi Chi LaRue a.k.a. Lawrence David (born 1959), cross dressing drag DJ including Lawrence David
- Larry David or Lawrence David (born 1947), American comedian, writer, actor, director, playwright, and television producer
