= Jonathan Lawrence =

American merchant and politician

Member of the New York State Senate for the Southern District
- In office September 9, 1777 – June 30, 1783
- Preceded by: Inaugural holder
- Succeeded by: Alexander McDougall

Personal details
- Born: October 4, 1737 Newtown, Province of New York, British America
- Died: September 4, 1812 (aged 74) New York City, New York, U.S.
- Spouses: Judith Fish (m. 1766; died 1767) Ruth Riker (after 1767)
- Children: 10, including Samuel, John, William
- Parent(s): Patience Sackett Lawrence; John Lawrence
- Occupation: Merchant, politician

Jonathan Lawrence (October 4, 1737 – September 4, 1812) was an American merchant and politician from New York.

== Early life ==
Lawrence was born on October 4, 1737, in Newtown, Queens County in what was then the Province of New York, a part of British America. He was the eighth son born to Patience (née Sackett) Lawrence (1701–1772) and John Lawrence (1695–1765).

His paternal grandparents were John Lawrence and Deborah (née Woodhull) Lawrence and his maternal grandparents were Capt. Joseph Sackett and Elizabeth (née Betts) Sackett. His family was large and many members were prominent in New York business and politics. His brother Daniel Lawrence was an Assemblyman and his nephew Nathaniel Lawrence (son of Thomas) was New York State Attorney General. Congressman James Lent and Recorder Richard Riker were his great-nephews.

== Career ==
At a young age, Lawrence became a merchant, visiting Europe and the West Indies in the employment of his eldest brother, John Lawrence before joining the house of Watson, Murray & Lawrence. After inheriting his brother John's estate and a portion of his brother Nathaniel's estate (who died unmarried in the West Indies), he retired c. 1771, around age thirty-four, and purchased a residence at Hurlgate which had been owned by his great-grandfather Thomas Lawrence, the youngest of three brothers who emigrated to America around 1645.

Beginning in May 1775 Lawrence was a member of the 1st, 3rd (May to June 1776) and 4th New York Provincial Congresses (beginning in July 1776, which became known as the First Constitutional Convention).

=== Revolutionary War ===
In 1772, he had been appointed captain in the provincial militia by the royal government. Once the New York Provincial Congress organized a militia in 1775, he was appointed major of the Queens and Suffolk brigade under Gen. Nathaniel Woodhull.

In August 1776, on the eve of the Battle of Long Island, his militia was sent to drive livestock in an effort to prevent it from falling into British hands. While the activities indirectly claimed the life of Woodhull, he had been ordered to Harlem to seek reinforcements from General George Washington.

Lawrence was appointed by Constitutional Convention to represent the Southern District of New York (consisting of Kings, New York, Queens, Richmond, Suffolk and Westchester counties) in the New York State Senate beginning with the 1st New York State Legislature in 1777 to the 6th in 1783. On October 17, 1778, he was one of four elected to the Council of Appointment, serving for one year. He was again one of four elected to the Council on July 22, 1782.

He later served as chairman of the city's committee for the reelection of George Clinton as governor (who later became the 4th Vice President of the United States under Thomas Jefferson and James Madison).

== Personal life ==
On March 16, 1766, he married Judith Fish (1749–1767), the daughter of Nathaniel Fish and Jannetje (née Berrien) Fish (a sister of Judge John Berrien). Jannetje's niece, Elizabeth Berrien, was married to Fish's nephew Nathaniel Lawrence, and was the aunt of John M. Berrien, the United States Attorney General under President Andrew Jackson. Before Judith's death on September 29, 1767, at age seventeen, they were the parents of one son:

- Jonathan Lawrence (1767–1850), a merchant with Lawrence & Whitney who married Elizabeth Rogers.

After his first wife's death in 1767, he married Ruth Riker (1746–1818), a member of the Riker family, for whom Rikers Island is named. Ruth was the daughter of Andrew and Jane Riker. Together, they were the parents of nine children, including:

- Judith Lawrence (1769–1827), who married John Ireland (1749–1836).
- Margaret Lawrence (1771–1851), who died unmarried, aged 81.
- Samuel Lawrence (1773–1837), who married Elizabeth Ireland, and became a U.S. Representative.
- Andrew Lawrence (1775–1806), a sailor who died "of the African fever, in one of the Dutch factory islands, near an outlet of that river, which has since been discovered to be the ancient Niger."
- Richard M. Lawrence (1778–1856), a merchant who sailed around the world, and upon his return to New York in 1815, became the vice-president of the National Insurance Company and then president of the Union Insurance Company, both in New York.
- Abraham Riker Lawrence (1780–1863), who served as president of the New York and Harlem Railroad in 1836 (after John Mason).
- Joseph Lawrence (1783–1817), who married Mary Sackett, daughter of John Sackett and Elizabeth (née Gibbs) Sackett.
- John L. Lawrence (1785–1849), who married Sarah Augusta Smith (1794–1877), daughter of General John Tangier Smith and granddaughter of Gen. Nathaniel Woodhull.
- William Thomas Lawrence (1788–1859), a merchant who married Margaret Sophia Muller, daughter of Remburtus F. Muller, in 1825.

Lawrence died on September 4, 1812, in New York City.

=== Descendants ===
Through his eldest daughter Judith, he was a grandfather of John Lawrence Ireland (1796–1879), who married Mary Floyd, a sister of John Gelston Floyd, a U.S. Representative, and a granddaughter of David Gelston (the Collector of the Port of New York) and William Floyd (a signer of the United States Declaration of Independence). Ireland was the father of John Busteed Ireland (who married Adelia Duane Pell, daughter of Robert Livingston Pell). Another grandchild was Louisa Anna Ireland (1800–1845), who married Henry Woodhull Nicholl, and was the mother of three: Elizabeth Smith Nicholl (first wife of Gen. Alexander Hamilton, a grandson, and namesake, of Gen. Alexander Hamilton, the first Secretary of the Treasury), Mary Louisa Ireland (wife of Maj. Henry Constantine Wayne of the U.S. Army), and Judith Ireland (wife of Capt. William Blair).
