= Mary V. Tingley Lawrence =

American author, correspondent, port inspector (1839/49–1931)

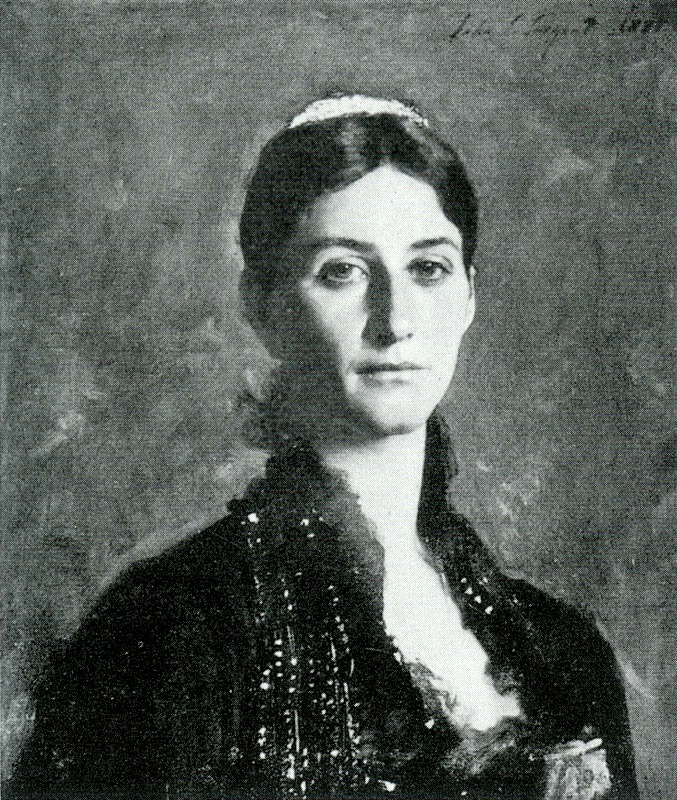
- Portrait of Mrs. Lawrence, oil on canvas, by John Singer Sargent, 1881
- Born: Mary Viola Tingley ca. 1840; Indiana, U.S.
- Died: April 24, 1931; San Francisco, California, U.S.
- Occupations: writer; journalist; customs inspector
- Spouse: James Henry Lawrence
- Writing career
- Pen name: May; Ridinghood

Signature
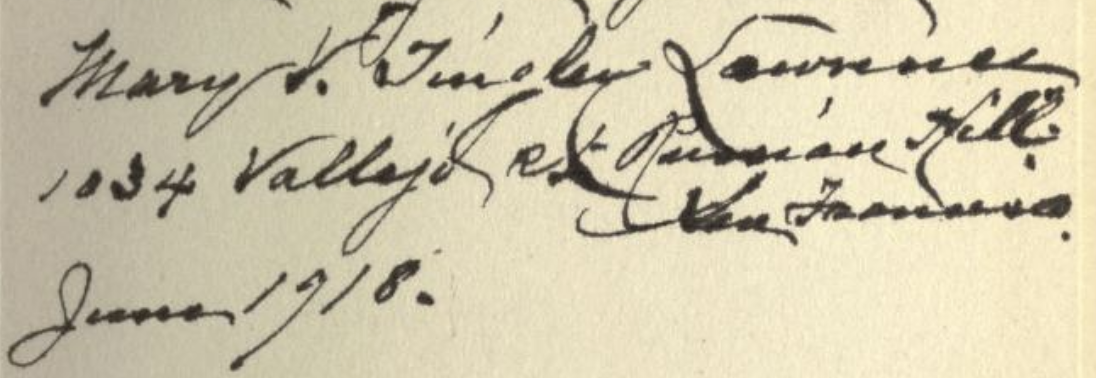

Mary V. Tingley Lawrence (née Tingley; pen names, May and Ridinghood; ca. 1840 – 1931) was an American writer and customs inspector. Born in Indiana, she moved to California at a young age, where she became widely known by her pen name, "Ridinghood," while working as a correspondent for The Union and other California and Nevada newspapers. Her journalistic work covered social matters and sketches. With Bret Harte, she compiled Outcroppings, a collection of poems by twenty early Californian writers. Lawrence was also a founder and honorary president of the Pacific Coast Women's Press Association and served for 30 years as a customs inspector at the Port of San Francisco.

== Early life and education ==
Mary Viola Tingley was born in Indiana, ca. 1840, and came to California in 1852. Her father was Col. George B. Tingley, one of California's pioneer state builders and statesmen. Col. Tingley, a native of Ohio, was a lawyer. He removed to Indiana, and there served in the Legislature with Vice-President-elect Thomas A. Hendricks and Thomas J. Henley. Tingley served as an officer in the Mexican–American War; came across the plains to California in 1849 with Henley; was an unsuccessful candidate for the United States Senate; was defeated for Congress in 1851. He died at San Francisco in 1862.

Louise Clappe was Mary's teacher and friend.

== Career ==
Early in her career, Lawrence served as Assistant in Grammar Instruction and Primary at the Rincon Grammar School, a San Francisco public grammar school.

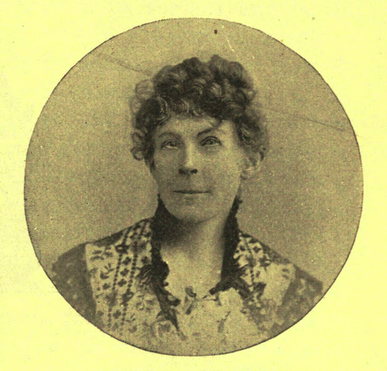
Photo in The story of the files, 1893

Starting with the pen name "May" and then switching to "Ridinghood", Lawrence was an early writer for The Sacramento Union. It is as "Ridinghood," that Lawrence was best known. Using that pen name, she was a correspondent from San Francisco for The Sacramento Union, writing a letter each week from San Francisco on social matters. The letters attracted significant attention, and the name "Ridinghood" became a household word among the families in the mining centers of California and Nevada. They also received favorable notice from the New-York Tribune and the Springfield Republican. Lawrence worked in many journalistic fields for The Daily Alta California , San Francisco Chronicle, San Francisco Examiner , San Francisco Evening Bulletin, and The Argonaut. She also wrote sketches for Overland Monthly , such as "A Summer With a Countess", relating to Theresa Yelverton or Lady Avonmore, "A Mountain Posy," "College Charlemagne", and others. She traveled in the western U.S. as a correspondent for different California journals. Amid all the temptations and inducements to write personals of a spicy or acrid nature, Lawrence took pleasure in thinking that she never wrote a line in her life that hurt someone.

Her name in probably best known in connection with Outcroppings, a collection of the poems by early Californian writers. Lawrence was also the author of a novel.

She was a Charter Member and the Honorary President of the Pacific Coast Women's Press Association; President Emeritus of the Ina Coolbrith Circle; and a member of Daughters of the American Revolution and California State Teachers' Institute.

For 30 years, Lawrence served as Customs Inspector of the Port of San Francisco, her responsibility being Inspector for Ladies on the Pacific steamships.

== Personal life ==
She married Hon. Senator James Henry Lawrence (or Laurence), who became a California State Senator. The couple had one daughter, Constance Violet (born 1876).

After an illness of several months, Mary Lawrence died in San Francisco, April 24, 1931, age 91.

== Selected works ==
- Outcroppings : being selections of California verse (Bret Harte (ed.), 1866) (text), via Internet Archive
- A diplomat's helpmate : how Rose F. Foote, wife of the first U.S. Minister and envoy entraordinary to Korea, served her country in the Far East, 1918 (text), via Internet Archive
