= Walter Lispenard Suydam =

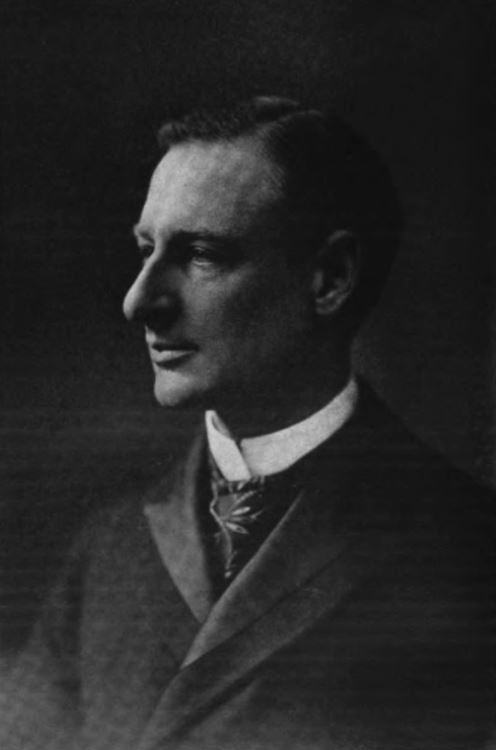

43rd President of the Saint Nicholas Society of the City of New York
- In office 1913–1913
- Preceded by: John Thomas Lockman
- Succeeded by: Charles Bradford Isham

Personal details
- Born: May 20, 1854; New York City, New York, U.S.
- Died: August 10, 1930 (aged 76); Blue Point, New York, U.S.
- Spouse: Jane Mesier Suydam (m. 1875)
- Relations: Caroline Astor (aunt); William Astor Jr. (uncle); John Jacob Astor IV (cousin); R. Fulton Cutting (brother-in-law); Abraham Schermerhorn (grandfather)
- Children: Walter Lispenard Suydam Jr.
- Parent(s): Anna White Schermerhorn; Charles Suydam

Walter Lispenard Suydam (May 20, 1854 – August 10, 1930) was a prominent member of New York society during the Gilded Age.

== Early life ==
Suydam was born on May 20, 1854, in New York City. He was the son of Anna White (née Schermerhorn) Suydam (1818–1886), and Charles Suydam (1818–1882). His siblings included Charles Schermerhorn Suydam and Helen Suydam, who married R. Fulton Cutting (brother of William Bayard Cutting).

His paternal grandparents were Ferdinand Suydam and Eliza (née Bartow) Suydam. His maternal grandfather was Abraham Schermerhorn. His relatives included: aunt Elizabeth Schermerhorn, who married General James I. Jones; Helen Schermerhorn, who married John Treat Irving Jr., a nephew of Washington Irving; and Caroline Webster Schermerhorn, who married William Backhouse Astor Jr., the middle son of William Backhouse Astor Sr. He was a cousin of Eleanor Colford Jones, who was married to Augustus Newbold Morris; Benjamin Welles, Emily Astor, who married sportsman/politician James John Van Alen; Helen Schermerhorn Astor, who married diplomat James Roosevelt (and elder half-brother of President Franklin Delano Roosevelt); Caroline Schermerhorn Astor, who married Marshall Orme Wilson (brother of banker Richard Thornton Wilson, Jr. and socialite Grace Wilson Vanderbilt); and John Jacob Astor IV, who married Ava Lowle Willing and, later, married socialite Madeleine Talmage Force, before perishing aboard the Titanic in 1912.

== Career ==
He started his business career at an early age and was prominent in financial circles on Wall Street as a produce exchange broker. He owned several large real estate holdings on Long Island.

During World War I, Suydam was a member of the National Guard of New York, achieving the rank of Major.

=== Society life ===
In 1892, both Suydam and his wife were both included in Ward McAllister's "Four Hundred", purported to be an index of New York's best families, published in The New York Times. Conveniently, 400 was the number of people that could fit into Mrs. Astor's ballroom (Walter's aunt).

Suydam was chairman of the Sayville Tournament Committee and was a member of the Metropolitan Club, the Union Club of the City of New York, the Navy Club, the Holland Club and the Saint Nicholas Society of the City of New York (of which he served as president in 1913), the Military Society of the War of 1812, the Society of Colonial Wars (of which he was an officer for many years), and the Sons of the American Revolution.

== Personal life ==
At age twenty on April 29, 1875, Suydam was married to his cousin, Jane Mesier Suydam (1855–1932), the daughter of Ann Middleton (née Lawrence) Suydam and John R. Suydam, a merchant and "gentleman well-known in New-York society for his genial and hospitably qualities." Her grandfather, John Suydam, "one of the old Knickerbocker merchants" who was the head of Suydam & Wycoff, and her uncles included Henry P. M. Suydam and D. Lydig Suydam. Jane's grandfather, John Suydam, organized the cemetery of St. Ann’s in Sayville, New York. They had an estate in Blue Point on Long Island (known as "Manowtasquott Lodge") and a home in New York City at 5 West 76th Street. Together, they were the parents of:

- Walter Lispenard Suydam Jr. (1884–1951), who married Louise Lawrence White (1886–1912), a great-granddaughter of Prosper Wetmore in 1903. They divorced in 1912 after she ran away with a plumber's assistant, whom she later married and shortly thereafter, committed suicide with. After her death, he married Elizabeth Maxwell Tybout Wood (1892–1951) in 1913.

Suydam died after a short illness at his estate in Blue Point, Long Island on August 10, 1930. His funeral and burial was held at St. Ann's Church in Sayville. His widow died two years later leaving an estate valued at "more than $20,000".
