= Mary Lawrence (sculptor) =

American sculptor (1868–1945)

Mary Lawrence Tonetti
- Born: Mary Trimble Lawrence; 1868; New York City, New York, U.S.
- Died: 1945 (aged 76–77)
- Other names: Mary Lawrence Tonetti
- Education: Art Students League of New York, Académie Julian
- Occupation: Sculpture
- Works: sculpture of Christopher Columbus at the World's Columbian Exposition
- Spouse: Francois M.L. Tonetti (m. 1900)

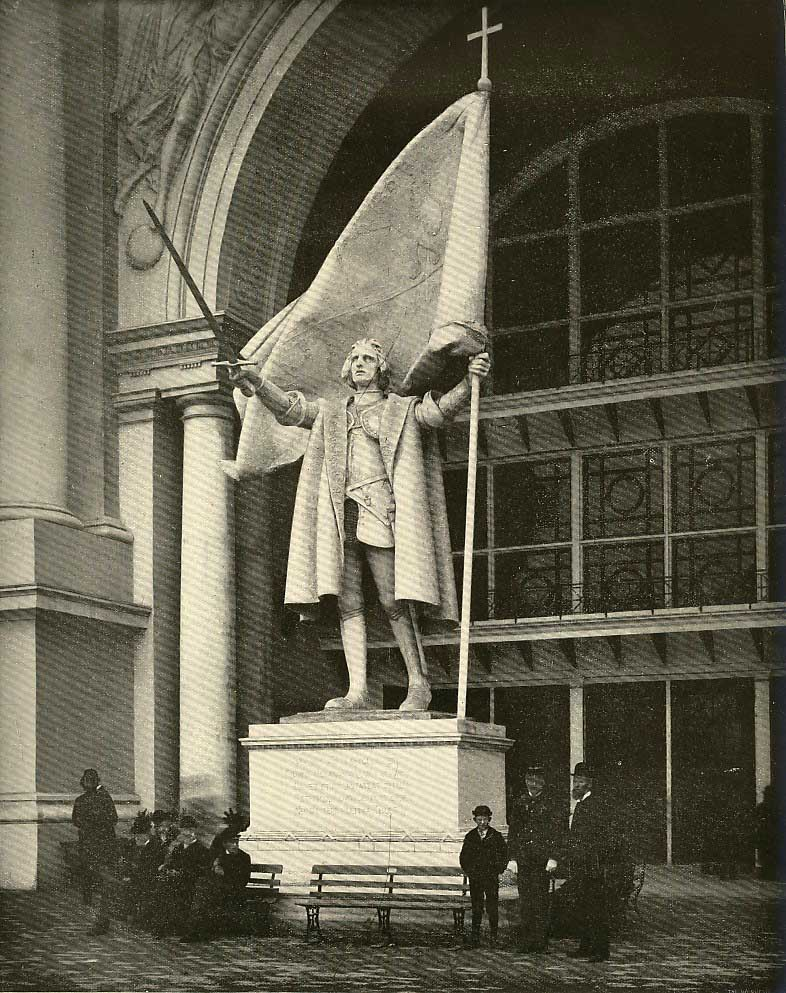
Columbus at the World's Columbian Exposition, 1893

Mary Trimble Lawrence (1868 – 1945) was an American sculptor. She designed the Christopher Columbus sculpture at the 1893 World's Columbian Exposition. Her married name was Mary Lawrence Tonetti.

== Early life and education ==
Lawrence was born in 1868, in New York City. She was from a prominent New York family whose ancestors included John Lawrence, mayor of New York City from 1673 to 1675, and 1691 to 1692; and the War of 1812 patriot, Captain James Lawrence who died after uttering the words, "Tell the men to fire faster! Don't give up the ship!"

While in Chicago preparing for the World's Columbian Exposition, sculptor Augustus St. Gaudens recommended Lawrence, who had been his pupil at the Art Students League of New York for the previous five years, for the creation of the monumental statue of Christopher Columbus to be placed at the entrance of the Administration Building. Like many of the buildings at the Exposition, the statue was made of staff, a temporary building material, and no longer exists. Although some critics claimed that St. Gaudens, or his brother Louis, had in fact modelled the work, St. Gaudens himself debunked this by stating in his Reminiscences that Lawrence, "modeled and executed it and to her goes all the credit for the vitality and breadth of treatment which it revealed."

St Gaudens biographer Bruce Wilkens relates that Millet objected to the prominent placement of the statue and arranged to have it moved to a spot near the train station. The architect Charles Follen McKim, a founding member of the prestigious architectural firm McKim, Mead and White and a widower, who had fallen in love with Lawrence in New York, had enough sway in Chicago to get the statue of Columbus returned to its former place. Lawrence never forgave Millet and is quoted as saying, "I could stamp on his face and grind it into the gravel until it bled."

== Career ==
Following the end of the Exposition Lawrence served as an assistant to St Gaudens, helping him in the creation of the General John A. Logan monument that was bound for Grant Park in Chicago. Thereafter, she moved to Paris where she studied at the Académie Julian. There, in 1893, she met a young assistant to Frederick William Macmonnies, Francois ML Tonetti. They were married in 1900 in New York City. Saint Gaudens, when he heard about the wedding "broke down and wept" and bemoaned the loss of her artistic ability to a much less talented sculptor, saying that she would likely have "lots of festive children," but would produce no more significant art. Her first child, a son named Oliver, died at the age of thirteen days.

Lawrence did produce a few more works after her marriage, such as two fountains she created with her husband for the Pan-American Exposition held in Buffalo, New York in 1901. In 1907, she contributed two statues, Venice and Spain - again in collaboration with her husband - to the parade of statues on the cornice of Cass Gilbert's US Customs House.

Lawrence Tonetti was one of the founders of New York's Cosmopolitan Club. As a supporter of the arts, she helped form an artists' colony at her ancestral home of Sneden's Landing, New York, now called Palisades, New York.

== Sources ==
- Opitz, Glenn B., Mantle Fielding's Dictionary of American Painters, Sculptors & Engravers, Apollo Books, Poughkeepsie, NY 1986
- Rubinstein, Charlotte Streifer, American Women Sculptors. G.K.Hall & CO., Boston 1990
- Saint-Gaudens, Homer, editor, The Reminiscences of Augustus Saint-Gaudens, Published by The Century, New York 1913
- New York Times. "MRS. MARY L. TONETTI; Sculptor, Ex-Aide to St. Gaudens, Made Statue for Fair of '93," March 15, 1945, Section, p. 23.
