= Samuel Lawrence (New York politician) =

American politician (1773–1837)

Member of the New York State Assembly for New York County
- In office 1811–1811

Member of the U.S. House of Representatives from New York's 25th district
- In office March 4, 1823 – March 3, 1825
- Preceded by: New district
- Succeeded by: Charles Humphrey

Personal details
- Born: May 23, 1773 Newtown, Province of New York, British America
- Died: October 20, 1837 (aged 64) Cayuta Lake, New York, U.S.
- Party: Democratic-Republican
- Parent: Jonathan Lawrence (father)
- Relatives: William T. Lawrence (brother); John L. Lawrence (brother); Abraham Lawrence (nephew)

Samuel Lawrence (May 23, 1773 – October 20, 1837) was an American politician from New York.

== Early life ==
He was the son of Jonathan Lawrence and Ruth (Riker) Lawrence. He attended the common schools, studied law with his cousin Attorney General Nathaniel Lawrence, was admitted to the bar, and commenced practice in New York City. Among his siblings was New York State Senator John L. Lawrence (father of Abraham R. Lawrence) and U.S. Congressman William T. Lawrence.

== Career ==
He was appointed a judge of the Marine Court of New York City. He was a member of the New York State Assembly (New York Co.) in 1811, and was Clerk of New York County from 1811 to 1812.

In 1814, he removed to an estate on the margin of Cayuta Lake, in Tioga County. He was a presidential elector in 1816 and voted for James Monroe and Daniel D. Tompkins. He was again a member of the State Assembly in 1820-21. Lawrence was elected as an Adams-Clay Democratic-Republican to the 18th United States Congress, holding office from March 4, 1823, to March 3, 1825.

== Personal life ==
His son Samuel Lawrence (1810-1882) was a member of the New York State Assembly from Tompkins County in 1847; and from Schuyler County in 1863.

U.S. House of Representatives
New district	Member of the U.S. House of Representatives from New York's 25th congressional district 1823–1825	Succeeded by Charles Humphrey
