= William T. Lawrence (politician) =

American politician

William T. L.
- Born: May 7, 1788; New York, New York
- Died: August 25, 1859 Alpine, New York

William Thomas Lawrence (May 7, 1788 – October 25, 1859) was a U.S. representative from New York, brother of Samuel Lawrence. Born as the son of Jonathan Lawrence in New York City, William attended the common schools.

He engaged in mercantile pursuits. During the War of 1812, Lawrence served in the Fourth Regiment and (commander the American forces at Fort Bowyer), New York State Artillery. He moved to Cayuga County in 1823 and engaged in farming. He was in the Justice of the Peace in 1838. Fort Bowyer was commanded by Major William Lawrence not William T. Lawrence. William Lawrence was from Maryland. He first served with the 4th Infantry and then the 2d Infantry from April 1802 until he was transferred to the 8th Infantry in May 1815. Information from Historical Register and Dictionary of the United States Army 1789–1903. Fort Bowyer was defended by the 2d Infantry not the 4th Infantry.

Lawrence was elected as a Whig to the Thirtieth Congress (March 4, 1847 – March 3, 1849). He died at his country home near Cayutaville on October 25, 1859. He was interred in the family cemetery on the Shore Road, in the Borough of Queens, New York City.

== Sources ==
- United States Congress. "William T. Lawrence (id: L000142)". Biographical Directory of the United States Congress.

U.S. House of Representatives
Preceded by Samuel S. Ellsworth	Member of the U.S. House of Representatives from New York's 26th congressional district 1847–1849	Succeeded by William Terry Jackson
