= Nathaniel Woodhull =

American politician

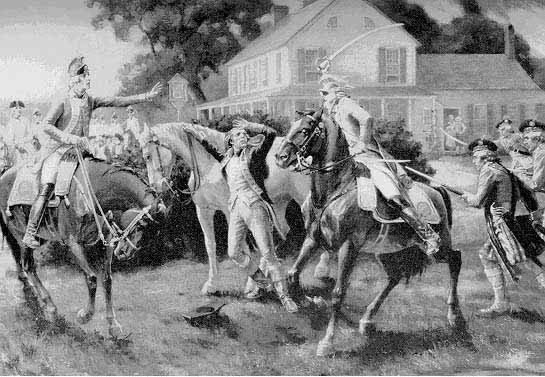
- The capture of Nathaniel Woodhull
- Born: 30 December 1722; Mastic, New York, British America
- Died: 20 September 1776 (aged 53) New Utrecht, New York, U.S.
- Allegiance: Great Britain; United Colonies; United States
- Service years: 1758–1760 (Great Britain); 1775–1776 (United Colonies); 1776 (United States)

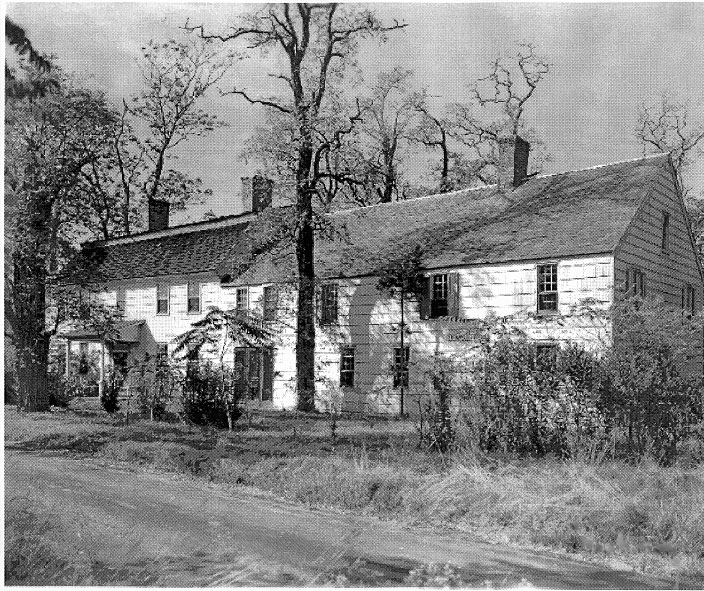
Nathaniel Woodhull's house in Mastic, New York

Nathaniel Woodhull (December 30, 1722 – September 20, 1776) was a leader of the New York Provincial Congress and a brigadier general of the New York Militia during the American Revolution.

== Biography ==
Coat of Arms of Nathaniel Woodhull

Woodhull was born on December 30, 1722, in Mastic, Province of New York to Nathaniel Woodhull and Sarah Smith Woodhull. His family had been prominent in New York affairs since the mid seventeenth century.

In 1758, the thirty-six year old Woodhull joined the New York provincial forces, where he held the rank of major. He fought in numerous battles during the 7 Years War. He was at the Battle of Carillon under General Abercromby, and at the Battle of Fort Frontenac under General Bradstreet. In 1760, as colonel of the 3rd Regiment of New York Provincials took part in the invasion of Canada under General Amherst. After the end of hostilities, he returned to farming and community affairs.

In 1761, he married Ruth Floyd, the sister of William Floyd, a signer of the Declaration of Independence. Sentiment against England's taxation of the colonies led to Suffolk County electing Woodhull to Province of New York assembly. From 1769 to 1775, he served as a member of the Province of New York assembly for Suffolk County. As such, he spoke against the Crown's colonial policies. He represented Suffolk also in the convention which chose delegates to the First Continental Congress, and in the New York Provincial Congress. In May 1775, the Provincial Congress assumed control of the colony and reorganized the militia. In August 1775, Woodhull was elected president of the New York Provincial Congress.

== Battle of Brooklyn ==
In October 1775, he was made brigadier general of the Suffolk and Queen's County militia. In August 1776, on the eve of the Battle of Long Island, Woodhull's militia was detailed to drive livestock east to prevent its falling into British hands. Woodhull's troops had driven 1,400 cattle out onto the Hempstead Plains, with 300 more ready to go. A severe thunderstorm drove the general to take refuge in a tavern run by Increase Carpenter, about two miles east of Jamaica in what is now Hollis. Relief was not forthcoming, and his situation deteriorated.

House where Woodhull died, built by Nicasius de Sille

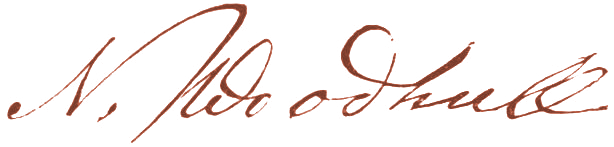
Nathaniel Woodhull's signature

Woodhull was captured near Jamaica by a detachment of Fraser's Highlanders led by Captain Sir James Baird. He was struck with a sword multiple times by a British officer, injuring his arm and head, purportedly for not saying "God save the King" as ordered, instead saying "God save us all". He was taken in a cattle transport to the Old Stone Church in Jamaica, which the British had converted into a prison. He was later moved to a brig serving as a prison ship in Wallabout Bay. While in captivity, Woodhull's wounds became infected and his health rapidly deteriorated. A sympathetic British officer had him transferred to the century-old house built by Nicasius di Sille in New Utrecht (now part of Brooklyn). (Note: The house was demolished in 1850 by the owner Baret Wyckoff. It was located in the current vicinity of 84th St. and New Utrecht Ave.) Woodhull's arm was amputated in an effort to save his life. He managed to call for his wife who was at his side when he died on September 20, 1776. He was buried at his family home.

== Legacy ==
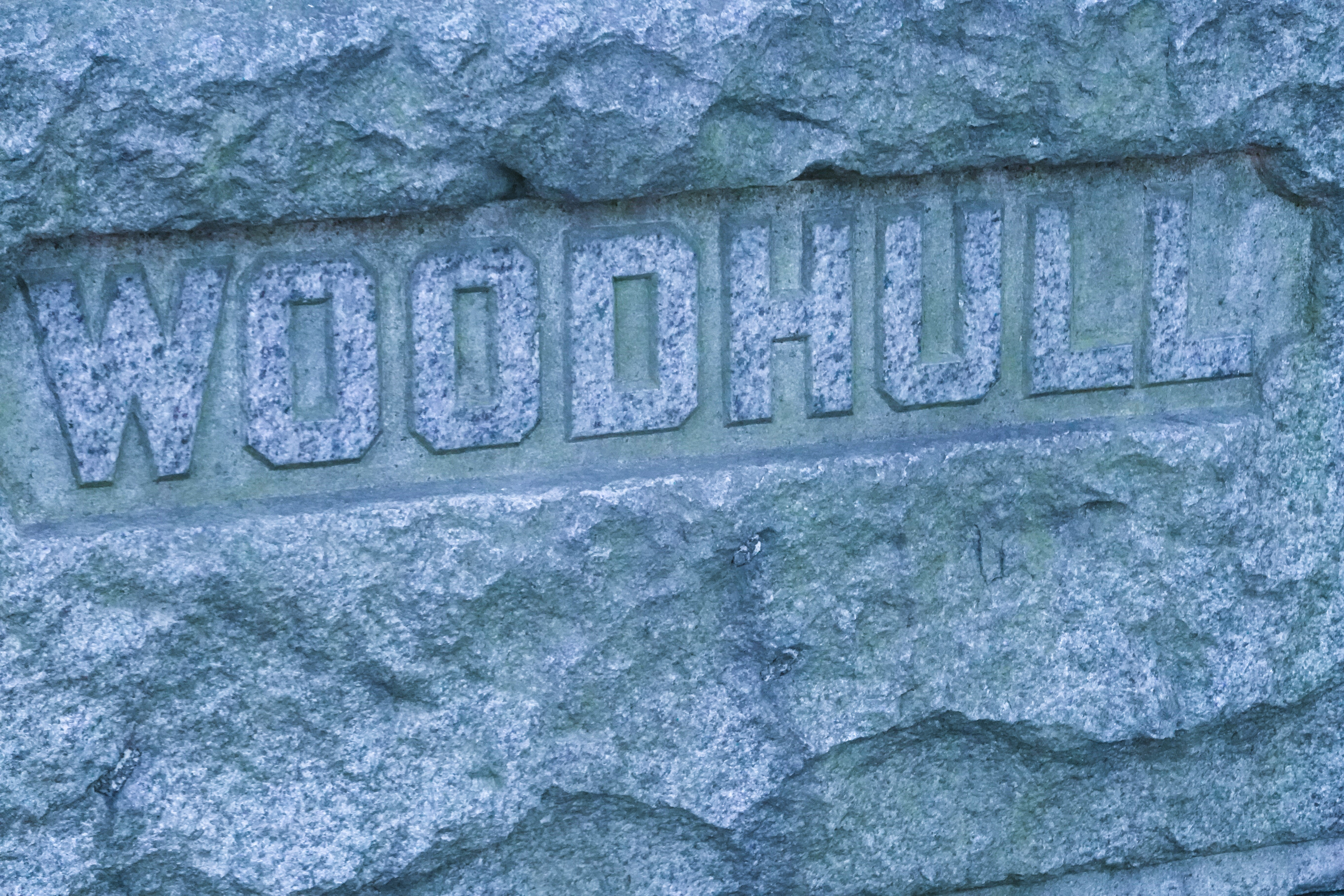
Woodhull Cannon base

The following schools are named after Nathaniel Woodhull:

- PS 35 Nathaniel Woodhull School, Hollis, Queens
- Nathaniel Woodhull Elementary School, Shirley, New York
- Nathaniel Woodhull Intermediate School, Huntington, New York

The post office in Mastic Beach, New York is also named after Nathaniel Woodhull.
